= 1996 Super 12 season =

Men's rugby union club competition

- Countries: Australia (3 teams); New Zealand (5 teams); South Africa (4 teams)
- Tournament format(s): Round-robin and knockout
- Champions: Auckland Blues (1st title)
- Matches played: 69
- Tries scored: 442 (6.41 per match)
- Top point scorer(s): Matt Burke, Waratahs (157)
- Top try scorer(s): James Small, Sharks (13)

The 1996 Super 12 season was the inaugural season of the Super 12, contested by teams from Australia, New Zealand and South Africa. The season ran from February to May 1996, with each team playing all the others once. At the end of the regular season, the top four teams entered the playoff semifinals, with the first placed team playing the fourth and the second placed team playing the third. The winner of each semifinal qualified for the final, which was contested between the Auckland Blues and Natal Sharks, with the Blues winning 45–21 to win the first Super 12 title.

This was the first season of professional rugby union in the Southern Hemisphere (the Northern Hemisphere had their first season a few months earlier due to the seasonal differences). The season was also the first of 10 under the deal between SANZAR and News Corporation which gave all broadcasting rights to News Limited for the Super 12, Tri-Nations, all inbound tours and test matches and in Australia, New Zealand and South Africa as well as provincial competition matches. The deal was collectively worth $550 million USD.

The teams from Australia and New Zealand were regional teams, a system that has continued to this day. South Africa used a different system for determining its Super 12 teams. The top four sides from the previous season of the country's domestic competition, the Currie Cup, were granted berths in the Super 12. This system would continue through the 1998 competition; only in 1999 did South Africa adopt the same system used by the other two participating countries.

== Teams and personnel ==
=== Overview ===
Union	Team	Stadia information		Coach
Union	Team	Stadia	Capacity	Coach
Australia	ACT Brumbies	Canberra Stadium, Bruce	25,000	Rod Macqueen
Australia	ACT Brumbies	Manuka Oval, Griffith	15,000	Rod Macqueen
Australia	New South Wales Waratahs	Sydney Football Stadium, Moore Park	45,000	Chris Hawkins
Australia	Queensland Reds	Ballymore Stadium, Herston	24,000	John Connolly
New Zealand	Auckland Blues	Eden Park, Kingsland	45,000	Graham Henry
New Zealand	Auckland Blues	Growers Stadium, Pukekohe	12,000	Graham Henry
New Zealand	Canterbury Crusaders	Lancaster Park, Waltham	35,000	Vance Stewart
New Zealand	Otago Highlanders	Carisbrook, Dunedin	29,000	Gordon Hunter
New Zealand	Waikato Chiefs	Waikato Stadium, Hamilton	25,000	Brad Meurant
New Zealand	Waikato Chiefs	Okara Park, Whangārei	30,000	Brad Meurant
New Zealand	Waikato Chiefs	Rotorua International Stadium, Rotorua	20,000	Brad Meurant
New Zealand	Wellington Hurricanes	The Showgrounds, Palmerston North Central	20,000	Frank Oliver
New Zealand	Wellington Hurricanes	McLean Park, Napier South	15,000	Frank Oliver
New Zealand	Wellington Hurricanes	Athletic Park, Newtown	39,000	Frank Oliver
New Zealand	Wellington Hurricanes	Yarrow Stadium, Westown	30,000	Frank Oliver
South Africa	Natal Sharks	Kings Park Stadium, Stamford Hill	52,000	Ian McIntosh
South Africa	Northern Transvaal	Loftus Versfeld Stadium, Arcadia	50,000	John Williams
South Africa	Transvaal	Ellis Park Stadium, Doornfontein	60,000	Kitch Christie; Ray Mordt
South Africa	Western Province	Newlands Stadium, Newlands	51,000	Alan Zondagh

== Regular season ==
=== Standings ===
Pos	Team	Pld	W	D	L	PF	PA	PD	TF	TA	TB	LB	Pts	Qualification
1	Queensland Reds	11	9	0	2	320	247	+73	35	26	4	1	41	Finals series
2	Auckland Blues (C)	11	8	0	3	408	354	+54	56	41	8	1	41	Finals series
3	Northern Transvaal	11	8	0	3	329	208	+121	31	23	4	2	38	Finals series
4	Natal Sharks	11	6	0	5	389	277	+112	47	31	6	3	33	Finals series
5	ACT Brumbies	11	7	0	4	306	273	+33	37	29	4	0	32	
6	Waikato Chiefs	11	6	0	5	291	269	+22	32	27	2	2	28	
7	New South Wales Waratahs	11	5	0	6	312	290	+22	36	32	5	3	28	
8	Otago Highlanders	11	5	0	6	329	391	−62	39	49	5	1	26	
9	Wellington Hurricanes	11	3	0	8	290	353	−63	31	41	3	2	17	
10	Transvaal	11	3	0	8	233	299	−66	25	32	2	2	16	
11	Western Province	11	3	1	7	251	353	−102	24	41	0	1	15	
12	Canterbury Crusaders	11	2	1	8	234	378	−144	24	45	1	2	13	

=== Match grid ===
Home \ Away	ACT	AUC	CAN	NAT	NSW	NOR	OTA	QUE	TRA	WAI	WEL	WES
ACT Brumbies	—	40–34		44–31			70–26	21–20	13–9		35–28	
Auckland Blues		—			56–44	30–26	51–29			39–31		48–30
Canterbury Crusaders	7–29	18–49	—		21–16	18–34	27–29					16–16
Natal Sharks	23–20		58–26	—				20–21	49–13	63–25		28–22
New South Wales Waratahs	44–10			6–34	—		29–25		32–11		52–25	
Northern Transvaal	23–10			30–8	32–29	—	59–29		25–15		38–20	
Otago Highlanders				33–32			—	57–17	29–15	5–22	15–44	
Queensland Reds		51–13	52–16		15–13	25–18		—		26–22		36–26
Transvaal		34–22	55–23					16–25	—	26–33		23–26
Waikato Chiefs	26–18		27–26		39–17	17–9				—	15–23	44–17
Wellington Hurricanes		28–36	13–36	27–43				25–32	32–16		—	
Western Province	25–16				22–30	7–35	25–52				35–25	—

Legend: Blue = home team win; Yellow = draw; Red = away team win.

=== Matches ===
==== Round 1 ====
1 March 1996

Wellington Hurricanes	28–36	Auckland Blues
Try: Alama Ieremia; Con: Jamie Cameron (1/1); Pen: Jamie Cameron (7)	Scoreboard	Try: Andrew Blowers; Eroni Clarke; Ofisa Tonu'u; Carlos Spencer; Craig Dowd; Con: Zinzan Brooke; Pen: Greg Cooper (3)

The Showgrounds, Palmerston North
Attendance: 13,000
Referee: Paddy O'Brien (New Zealand)

1 March 1996

New South Wales Waratahs	32–11	Transvaal
Try: Matt Burke (2); Tim Gavin; Alistair Murdoch; Con: Matt Burke (3/3); Pen: Matt Burke (2)	Scoreboard	Try: Christiaan Scholtz; Pen: Gavin Johnson (2)

Sydney Football Stadium, Sydney
Attendance: 26,188
Referee: Scott Young (Australia)

2 March 1996

Natal Sharks	28–22	Western Province
Try: Jeremy Thomson; André Joubert; Dieter Kriese; Con: André Joubert (2); Pen: André Joubert (3)	Scoreboard	Try: Justin Swart; Pieter Rossouw; Louis Blom; Con: Vlokkie Cilliers (2); Pen: Vlokkie Cilliers

Kings Park Stadium, Durban
Referee: Tappe Henning (South Africa)

3 March 1996

Waikato Chiefs	27–26	Canterbury Crusaders
Try: Glen Osborne; Eric Rush; Con: Ian Foster; Pen: Ian Foster (5)	Scoreboard	Try: Adrian Tukaki; Brad Fleming; Con: Andy Miller (2); Pen: Andy Miller (3); Drop: Andy Miller

Waikato Stadium, Hamilton
Referee: Glenn Wahlstrom (New Zealand)

3 March 1996

Otago Highlanders	57–17	Queensland Reds
Try: Stephen Bachop (2); Taine Randell; Lio Falaniko; Brendon Timmins; Kupu Vanisi; Brian Lima; Con: Matthew Cooper (5); Pen: Matthew Cooper (4)	Scoreboard	Try: Ben Tune (2); Garrick Morgan; Con: John Eales

Carisbrook, Dunedin
Attendance: 12,000
Referee: Colin Hawke (New Zealand)

5 March 1996

ACT Brumbies	13–9	Transvaal
Try: Elisi Vunipola; Con: David Knox; Pen: David Knox (2)	Scoreboard	Pen: Gavin Johnson (2); Gavin Lawless

Canberra Stadium, Canberra
Attendance: 10,042
Referee: Wayne Erickson (Australia)

==== Round 2 ====
9 March 1996

Otago Highlanders	29–15	Transvaal
Try: Jeff Wilson (2); Tony Brown; Brian Lima; Con: Tony Brown (2); Jeff Wilson; Pen: Jeff Wilson	Scoreboard	Try: Charles Rossouw; Japie Mulder; Con: Gavin Johnson; Pen: Gavin Johnson

Carisbrook, Dunedin
Referee: Steve Walsh (New Zealand)

9 March 1996

ACT Brumbies	35–28	Wellington Hurricanes
Try: Mitch Hardy (2); George Gregan; Ipolito Fenukitau; Con: David Knox (2), Adam Friend; Pen: David Knox (3)	Scoreboard	Try: Christian Cullen; Chresten Davis; Rhys Duggan; Con: Jamie Cameron (2); Pen: Jamie Cameron (3)

Canberra Stadium, Canberra

9 March 1996

Western Province	22–30	New South Wales Waratahs
Try: Justin Swart; Con: Joel Stransky; Pen: Joel Stransky (5)	Scoreboard	Try: Alistair Murdoch; Tim Gavin; Matt Burke; Con: Matt Burke (3); Pen: Matt Burke (3)

Newlands Stadium, Cape Town
Referee: Ian Rogers (South Africa)

9 March 1996

Northern Transvaal	30–8	Natal Sharks
Try: Jacques Olivier; Adriaan Richter; Penalty try Con: Jannie Kruger (3); Pen: Jannie Kruger (3)	Scoreboard	Try: James Small; Con: André Joubert

Loftus Versfeld Stadium, Pretoria
Referee: Andre Watson (South Africa)

10 March 1996

Canterbury Crusaders	18–49	Auckland Blues
Try: Adrian Tukaki; Brad Fleming; Matt Sexton; Drop: Graeme Dempster	Scoreboard	Try: Andrew Blowers (2); Lee Stensness; Jonah Lomu; Charles Riechelmann; Waisake Sotutu; Errol Brain; Penalty try Con: Carlos Spencer (3); Pen: Carlos Spencer

Lancaster Park, Christchurch
Attendance: 10,400
Referee: Paddy O'Brien (New Zealand)

10 March 1996

Queensland Reds	26–22	Waikato Chiefs
Try: Damian Smith; Ben Tune; Con: John Eales (2); Pen: John Eales (4)	Scoreboard	Try: Joeli Veitayaki; Walter Little; Penalty try Con: Ian Foster (2); Pen: Ian Foster

Ballymore Stadium, Brisbane
Referee: Mick Keogh (Australia)

==== Round 3 ====
15 March 1996

Wellington Hurricanes	32–16	Transvaal
Try: Christian Cullen; Tana Umaga; Alama Ieremia; Mark Allen; Con: Jamie Cameron (3); Pen: Jamie Cameron (2)	Scoreboard	Try: Jannie van der Walt; Con: Gavin Lawless; Pen: Gavin Lawless (3)

McLean Park, Napier
Referee: Glenn Wahlstrom (New Zealand)

15 March 1996

ACT Brumbies	40–34	Auckland Blues
Try: Ipolito Fenukitau (2); Joe Roff; Troy Coker; Owen Finegan; Con: Adam Friend (3); Pen: Adam Friend (3)	Scoreboard	Try: Joeli Vidiri (2); Eroni Clarke; Jonah Lomu; Chris Rose; Con: Carlos Spencer (3); Pen: Carlos Spencer

Canberra Stadium, Canberra
Attendance: 17,019
Referee: Barry Leask (Australia)

16 March 1996

Western Province	25–52	Otago Highlanders
Try: Justin Swart (2); Simon Berridge; Con: Joel Stransky (2); Pen: Joel Stransky (2)	Scoreboard	Try: To'o Vaega (3); Paul Cooke (2), Brian Lima; Stu Forster; Brendon Timmins; Con: Jeff Wilson (6)

Newlands Stadium, Cape Town
Referee: Marius Franken (South Africa)

16 March 1996

Northern Transvaal	32–29	New South Wales Waratahs
Try: FA Meiring; Krynauw Otto; Con: Lance Sherrell; Jannie Kruger; Pen: Lance Sherrell (6)	Scoreboard	Try: Tim Kelaher; Sam Payne; Con: Matt Burke (2); Pen: Matt Burke (5)

Loftus Versfeld Stadium, Pretoria
Referee: Stef Neethling (South Africa)

17 March 1996

Queensland Reds	52–16	Canterbury Crusaders
Try: Garrick Morgan (2); Ben Tune; Mark Connors; Michael Flanagan; Michael Foley; Con: John Eales (5); Pen: John Eales (4)	Scoreboard	Try: Mark Mayerhofler; Con: Mark Mayerhofler; Pen: Andy Miller (3)

Ballymore Stadium, Brisbane
Referee: Wayne Erickson (Australia)

17 March 1996

Natal Sharks	63–25	Waikato Chiefs
Try: James Small (3); André Joubert; Dick Muir; Joos Joubert; Ollie le Roux; Con: André Joubert (5); Pen: André Joubert (5); Henry Honiball	Scoreboard	Try: Frank Bunce; Richard Turner; Blair Larsen; Con: Ian Foster (2); Pen: Ian Foster; Drop: Ian Foster

Kings Park Stadium, Durban
Referee: Andre Watson (South Africa)

==== Round 4 ====
20 March 1996

Northern Transvaal	59–29	Otago Highlanders
Try: André Snyman; Danie van Schalkwyk; Jannie Kruger; Joost van der Westhuizen; Adriaan Richter; Con: Jannie Kruger (5); Pen: Jannie Kruger (8)	Scoreboard	Try: Matthew Cooper; Taine Randell; Con: Matthew Cooper (2); Pen: Matthew Cooper (2); Jeff Wilson (3)

Loftus Versfeld Stadium, Pretoria
Referee: Ian Rogers (South Africa)

22 March 1996

Canterbury Crusaders	16–16	Western Province
Try: Simon Forrest; Con: Graeme Dempster; Pen: Simon Forrest; Graeme Dempster (2)	Scoreboard	Try: Johan Kapp; Con: Vlokkie Cilliers; Pen: Joel Stransky (3)

Lancaster Park, Christchurch
Referee: Paddy O'Brien (New Zealand)

23 March 1996

Transvaal	26–23	Waikato Chiefs
Try: Jopie Adlam; Francois Pienaar; Con: Gavin Lawless (2); Pen: Gavin Lawless (4)	Scoreboard	Try: Glen Osborne (2); Con: Warren Burton (2); Pen: Warren Burton (3)

Ellis Park Stadium, Johannesburg
Referee: Tappe Henning (South Africa)

24 March 1996

Wellington Hurricanes	25–32	Queensland Reds
Try: Alex Telea; Chresten Davis; Pen: Jamie Cameron (3); Simon Mannix (2)	Scoreboard	Try: Tim Horan; Daniel Herbert; Ben Tune; Tony Daly; Toutai Kefu; Con: John Eales (2); Pen: John Eales

Athletic Park, Wellington
Referee: Colin Hawke (New Zealand)

24 March 1996

New South Wales Waratahs	44–10	ACT Brumbies
Try: Jason Madz (2); David Campese; Scott Bowen; Richard Harry; Matt Burke; Con: Matt Burke (4); Pen: Matt Burke (2)	Scoreboard	Try: Joe Roff; Andrew Williams

Sydney Football Stadium, Sydney
Attendance: 20,687
Referee: Andrew Cole (Australia)

==== Round 5 ====
27 March 1996

Auckland Blues	48–30	Western Province
Try: Eroni Clarke; Andrew Blowers; Carlos Spencer; Michael Jones; Ofisa Tonu'u; Richard Fromont; Con: Carlos Spencer (3); Pen: Carlos Spencer (3); Drop: Carlos Spencer	Scoreboard	Try: Simon Berridge; Tinus Linee; Corné Krige; Con: Joel Stransky (3); Pen: Joel Stransky (3)

Eden Park, Auckland
Referee: Steve Walsh (New Zealand)

29 March 1996

Canterbury Crusaders	21–16	New South Wales Waratahs
Try: Mark Mayerhofler; Justin Marshall; Con: Greg Coffey; Pen: Greg Coffey (3)	Scoreboard	Try: Warwick Waugh; Con: Matt Burke; Pen: Matt Burke (3)

Lancaster Park, Christchurch
Referee: Glenn Wahlstrom (New Zealand)

29 March 1996

ACT Brumbies	44–31	Natal Sharks
Try: Joe Roff (4); Stephen Larkham; James Holbeck; Con: Adam Friend (4); Pen: Adam Friend (2)	Scoreboard	Try: Henry Honiball; Jeremy Thomson; James Small; Con: Henry Honiball (2); Pen: Henry Honiball (4)

Manuka Oval, Canberra
Attendance: 12,000
Referee: Stuart Dickinson (Australia)

29 March 1996

Queensland Reds	25–18	Northern Transvaal
Try: Penalty try Con: John Eales; Pen: John Eales (6)	Scoreboard	Try: Danie van Schalkwyk; Andries Truscott; Con: Jannie Kruger; Pen: Jannie Kruger (2)

Ballymore Stadium, Brisbane
Referee: Peter Marshall (Australia)

30 March 1996

Waikato Chiefs	44–17	Western Province
Try: Milton Going (2); Joeli Veitayaki; Craig Stevenson; Ian Foster; Con: Ian Foster (4); Warren Burton; Pen: Warren Burton (3)	Scoreboard	Try: Justin Swart (2); Con: Joel Stransky (2); Pen: Joel Stransky

Waikato Stadium, Hamilton
Referee: Steve Walsh (New Zealand)

30 March 1996

Otago Highlanders	15–44	Wellington Hurricanes
Pen: Simon Culhane (4); Drop: Simon Culhane	Scoreboard	Try: Sam Doyle; Rhys Duggan; Karl Williams; Marty Berry; Penalty try Con: Jamie Cameron (5); Pen: Jamie Cameron (3)

Carisbrook, Dunedin
Referee: Alan Riley (New Zealand)

==== Round 6 ====
2 April 1996

Auckland Blues	51–29	Otago Highlanders
Try: Jarrod Cunningham (2); Andrew Blowers (2), James Kerr; Eroni Clarke; Dylan Mika; Con: Carlos Spencer (4); Pen: Carlos Spencer (2)	Scoreboard	Try: Matthew Cooper; George Leaupepe; Brett McCormack; Penalty try Con: Simon Culhane (3); Drop: Simon Culhane

Growers Stadium, Pukekohe
Referee: Colin Hawke (New Zealand)

2 April 1996

New South Wales Waratahs	6–34	Natal Sharks
Pen: Matt Burke (2)	Scoreboard	Try: Jeremy Thomson (2); James Small; Joos Joubert; Wayne Fyvie; Con: Henry Honiball (3); Pen: Henry Honiball

Sydney Football Stadium, Sydney
Attendance: 30,147
Referee: Scott Young (Australia)

3 April 1996

Waikato Chiefs	26–18	ACT Brumbies
Try: Scott McLeod; Duane Monkley; Con: Warren Burton (2); Pen: Warren Burton (4)	Scoreboard	Try: John Langford; Patricio Noriega; Con: Adam Friend; Pen: Adam Friend (2)

Okara Park, Whangārei
Referee: Glenn Wahlstrom (New Zealand)

3 April 1996

Canterbury Crusaders	18–34	Northern Transvaal
Try: Damon Kaui (2); Con: Greg Coffey; Pen: Greg Coffey (2)	Scoreboard	Try: Adriaan Richter (2); Dawie du Toit; Jacques Olivier; Andries Truscott; Con: Lance Sherrell (3); Pen: Lance Sherrell

Lancaster Park, Christchurch
Referee: Rod Hill (New Zealand)

3 April 1996

Queensland Reds	36–26	Western Province
Try: Tim Horan; Daniel Herbet; Jason Little; Mark Connors; Con: John Eales (2); Pen: John Eales (4)	Scoreboard	Try: Joggie Viljoen; Garry Pagel; Johan Kapp; Con: Joel Stransky; Pen: Joel Stransky (3)

Ballymore Stadium, Brisbane
Referee: Mick Keogh (Australia)

6 April 1996

Wellington Hurricanes	27–43	Natal Sharks
Try: Christian Cullen (2); Marty Berry; Tana Umaga; Con: Jamie Cameron (2); Pen: Jamie Cameron	Scoreboard	Try: André Joubert (3); James Small (3); Con: Henry Honiball (2); Pen: Henry Honiball (3)

Athletic Park, Wellington
Attendance: 15,000
Referee: Colin Hawke (New Zealand)

7 April 1996

Auckland Blues	30–26	Northern Transvaal
Try: Jonah Lomu (2); Andrew Blowers; Lee Stensness; Con: Carlos Spencer (2); Pen: Carlos Spencer (2)	Scoreboard	Try: Dawie du Toit; Frikkie Bosman; Lance Sherrell; Con: Lance Sherrell; Pen: Lance Sherrell (3)

Eden Park, Auckland
Referee: Steve Walsh (New Zealand)

==== Round 7 ====
8 April 1996

Canterbury Crusaders	7–29	ACT Brumbies
Try: Richard Loe; Con: Greg Coffey	Scoreboard	Try: Craig Sweeney; Ipolito Fenukitau; Mitch Hardy; Con: Adam Friend; Pen: Adam Friend (4)

Lancaster Park, Christchurch
Referee: Glenn Wahlstrom (New Zealand)

10 April 1996

Otago Highlanders	33–32	Natal Sharks
Try: Brian Lima; Jeff Wilson; John Leslie; Matthew Cooper; Con: Matthew Cooper (2); Pen: Matthew Cooper (2); Jeff Wilson	Scoreboard	Try: André Joubert; Jeremy Thomson; Wayne Fyvie; Wikus van Heerden; Con: Henry Honiball; Drop: James Small

Carisbrook, Dunedin
Referee: Colin Hawke (New Zealand)

11 April 1996

Waikato Chiefs	17–9	Northern Transvaal
Try: Glen Osborne; Norm Berryman; Con: Warren Burton (2); Pen: Warren Burton	Scoreboard	Pen: Dawie du Toit; Jannie Kruger; Drop: Jannie Kruger

Waikato Stadium, Hamilton
Referee: Steve Walsh (New Zealand)

13 April 1996

Transvaal	23–26	Western Province
Try: Gavin Lawless; James Dalton; Con: Gavin Lawless (2); Pen: Gavin Lawless (3)	Scoreboard	Try: Justin Swart; Pen: Joel Stransky (7)

Ellis Park Stadium, Johannesburg
Referee: Ian Rogers (South Africa)

14 April 1996

Queensland Reds	15–13	New South Wales Waratahs
Pen: John Eales (5)	Scoreboard	Try: Kevin O'Kane; Con: Matt Burke; Pen: Matt Burke (2)

Ballymore Stadium, Brisbane
Attendance: 22,296
Referee: Wayne Erickson (Australia)

14 April 1996

Wellington Hurricanes	13–36	Canterbury Crusaders
Try: Christian Cullen; Con: Jamie Cameron; Pen: Jamie Cameron (2)	Scoreboard	Try: Damon Kaui; Daryl Gibson; Pita Alatini; Todd Blackadder; Con: Andy Miller (2); Pen: Andy Miller (4)

Yarrow Stadium, New Plymouth
Referee: Paddy O'Brien (New Zealand)

==== Round 8 ====
16 April 1996

Otago Highlanders	5–22	Waikato Chiefs
Try: Matthew Cooper	Scoreboard	Try: Paul Mitchell; Richard Turner; Simon Crabb; Con: Ian Foster (2); Pen: Ian Foster

Rugby Park Stadium, Invercargill
Referee: Colin Hawke (New Zealand)

19 April 1996

Northern Transvaal	25–15	Transvaal
Try: Hannes Venter; Con: Jannie Kruger; Pen: Jannie Kruger (5); Drop: Jannie Kruger	Scoreboard	Try: Gavin Lawless; Ian Hattingh; Pieter Hendriks

Loftus Versfeld Stadium, Pretoria
Referee: Marius Franken (South Africa)

20 April 1996

Auckland Blues	39–31	Waikato Chiefs
Try: Joeli Vidiri; Jonah Lomu; Ofisa Tonu'u; Zinzan Brooke; Penalty try Con: Carlos Spencer (3); Adrian Cashmore; Pen: Adrian Cashmore; Carlos Spencer	Scoreboard	Try: Eric Rush; Paul Mitchell; Penalty try Con: Ian Foster (2); Pen: Ian Foster (4)

Eden Park, Auckland
Referee: Steve Walsh (New Zealand)

20 April 1996

ACT Brumbies	21–20	Queensland Reds
Try: Ipolito Fenukitau; Owen Finegan; Con: Adam Friend; Pen: Adam Friend (2); Joe Roff	Scoreboard	Try: Ben Tune; Daniel Herbert; Con: John Eales (2); Pen: John Eales (2)

Canberra Stadium, Canberra
Referee: Stuart Dickinson (Australia)

21 April 1996

New South Wales Waratahs	29–25	Otago Highlanders
Try: Alistair Murdoch; David Campese; Matt Dixon; Tim Wallace; Con: Matt Burke (3); Pen: Matt Burke	Scoreboard	Try: Brian Lima (2); Kupu Vanisi; Con: Matthew Cooper (2); Pen: Matthew Cooper (2)

Sydney Football Stadium, Sydney
Attendance: 24,617
Referee: Scott Young

==== Round 9 ====
23 April 1996

Western Province	35–25	Wellington Hurricanes
Try: Joggie Viljoen (2); Justin Swart; Con: Joel Stransky; Pen: Joel Stransky (6)	Scoreboard	Try: Christian Cullen; George Konia; Karl Williams; Con: Jon Preston (2); Pen: Jon Preston (2)

Newlands Stadium, Cape Town
Attendance: 22,169
Referee: Tappe Henning (South Africa)

23 April 1996

Transvaal	55–23	Canterbury Crusaders
Try: James Dalton (2); Gavin Lawless; Gerhard Combrinck; Johan Roux; Pieter Hendriks; Penalty try Con: Gavin Lawless (4); Pen: Gavin Lawless (4)	Scoreboard	Try: Angus Gardiner (2); Justin Marshall; Con: Andy Miller; Pen: Andy Miller (2)

Ellis Park Stadium, Johannesburg
Referee: Stef Neethling (South Africa)

26 April 1996

Queensland Reds	51–13	Auckland Blues
Try: Garrick Morgan (2); Ben Tune; Damien Smith; Jason Little; Mark Connors; Toutai Kefu; Con: John Eales (5); Pen: John Eales (2)	Scoreboard	Try: Joeli Vidiri; Olo Brown; Pen: Adrian Cashmore

Ballymore Stadium, Brisbane
Referee: Peter Marshall (Australia)

27 April 1996

Northern Transvaal	38–20	Wellington Hurricanes
Try: André Snyman; Andries Truscott; Ruben Kruger; Theo Jansen van Rensburg; Con: Jannie Kruger (3); Pen: Jannie Kruger (3); Joost Van der Westhuizen	Scoreboard	Try: Alex Telea; Jason O'Halloran; Tana Umaga; Con: Marty Berry; Pen: Marty Berry

Loftus Versfeld Stadium, Pretoria
Referee: Andre Watson (South Africa)

27 April 1996

Natal Sharks	58–26	Canterbury Crusaders
Try: Cabous van der Westhuizen (2); Joost Joubert (2), James Small; Jeremy Thomson; John Allan; Ollie Le Roux; Con: Henry Honiball (5); André Joubert; Pen: Henry Honiball (2)	Scoreboard	Try: Adrian Tukaki; Norm Maxwell; Con: Andy Miller (2); Pen: Andy Miller (4)

Kings Park Stadium, Durban
Referee: Carl Spannenberg (South Africa)

28 April 1996

Waikato Chiefs	39–17	New South Wales Waratahs
Try: Ian Jones (3); Eric Rush (2); Con: Ian Foster (4); Pen: Ian Foster; Drop: Ian Foster	Scoreboard	Try: Alistair Murdoch; Jason Madz; Con: Matt Burke (2); Pen: Matt Burke

Waikato Stadium, Hamilton
Referee: Glenn Wahlstrom (New Zealand)

28 April 1996

Western Province	25–16	ACT Brumbies
Try: Johan Kapp; Rhys Botha; Vlok Cilliers; Con: Joel Stransky (2); Pen: Joel Stransky (2)	Scoreboard	Try: Patricio Noriega; Con: David Knox; Pen: David Knox (2); Adam Friend

Newlands Stadium, Cape Town
Attendance: 28,107
Referee: Ian Rogers (South Africa)

==== Round 10 ====
1 May 1996

Auckland Blues	56–44	New South Wales Waratahs
Try: Joeli Vidiri (3); Eroni Clarke; Ofisa Tonu'u; Olo Brown; Zinzan Brooke; Penalty try Con: Adrian Cashmore (5); Pen: Adrian Cashmore (2)	Scoreboard	Try: Alistair Murdoch; Andrew Blades; Anthony Ekert; Daniel Manu; David Campese; Warwick Waugh; Con: Matt Burke (4); Pen: Matt Burke (2)

Eden Park, Auckland
Referee: Paddy O'Brien (New Zealand)

1 May 1996

Natal Sharks	49–13	Transvaal
Try: Henry Honiball (2); Adrian Garvey; André Joubert; James Small; Wayne Fyvie; Con: Henry Honiball (5); Pen: Henry Honiball (3)	Scoreboard	Try: Gavin Lawless; Con: Gavin Lawless; Pen: Gavin Lawless (2)

Kings Park Stadium, Durban
Referee: Stef Neethling (South Africa)

4 May 1996

Waikato Chiefs	15–23	Wellington Hurricanes
Try: Dean Anglesey; Warren Johnston; Con: Ian Foster; Pen: Ian Foster	Scoreboard	Try: Jason O'Halloran; Mark Allen; Con: Jon Preston (2); Pen: Jon Preston (3)

Rotorua International Stadium, Rotorua
Referee: Glenn Wahlstrom (New Zealand)

4 May 1996

Northern Transvaal	23–10	ACT Brumbies
Try: Frikkie Bosman; Pen: Jannie Kruger (6)	Scoreboard	Try: Marco Caputo; Patricio Noriega

Loftus Versfeld Stadium, Pretoria
Referee: Stef Neethling (South Africa)

5 May 1996

Canterbury Crusaders	27–29	Otago Highlanders
Try: Justin Marshall; Pita Alatini; Richard Loe; Con: Andy Miller (3); Pen: Andy Miller (2)	Scoreboard	Try: Jeff Wilson (2); To'o Vaega; Con: Matthew Cooper; Pen: Matthew Cooper (4)

Lancaster Park, Christchurch
Referee: Steve Walsh (New Zealand)

5 May 1996

Natal Sharks	20–21	Queensland Reds
Try: André Joubert; Pen: Henry Honiball (5)	Scoreboard	Try: Jason Little; Tim Horan; Con: John Eales; Pen: John Eales (3)

Kings Park Stadium, Durban
Referee: Tappe Henning (South Africa)

==== Round 11 ====
7 May 1996

Transvaal	34–22	Auckland Blues
Try: Francois Pienaar; Ian McDonald; Joe Gillingham; Johan Roux; Con: Gavin Lawless (4); Pen: Gavin Lawless (2)	Scoreboard	Try: Joeli Vidiri (2); Penalty try Con: Adrian Cashmore (2); Pen: Adrian Cashmore

Ellis Park Stadium, Johannesburg
Referee: Steve Walsh (New Zealand)

10 May 1996

New South Wales Waratahs	52–25	Wellington Hurricanes
Try: Alistair Murdoch (3); David Campese; Jason Madz; Matt Burke; Richard Harry; Con: Matt Burke (4); Pen: Matt Burke (3)	Scoreboard	Try: Alex Telea; Christian Cullen; Tana Umaga; Con: Jon Preston (2); Pen: Jon Preston (2)

Sydney Football Stadium, Sydney
Attendance: 20,174
Referee: Andrew Cole (Australia)

10 May 1996

Western Province	7–35	Northern Transvaal
Try: Nico Wegner; Con: Vlok Cilliers	Scoreboard	Try: Hannes Venter (2); Theo Jansen van Rensburg (2), Krynauw Otto; Con: Jannie Kruger (2); Pen: Jannie Kruger (2)

Newlands Stadium, Cape Town
Attendance: 37,524
Referee: Johann Meuwesen (South Africa)

11 May 1996

Transvaal	16–25	Queensland Reds
Try: Johan Roux; Pieter Hendriks; Pen: Gavin Lawless (2)	Scoreboard	Try: Ben Tune; Brett Johnstone; Tim Horan; Con: John Eales (2); Pen: John Eales (2)

Ellis Park Stadium, Johannesburg
Referee: Ian Rogers (South Africa)

11 May 1996

Natal Sharks	23–30	Auckland Blues
Try: James Small; Penalty try Con: Henry Honiball (2); Pen: Henry Honiball (3)	Scoreboard	Try: Adrian Cashmore; Eroni Clarke; Penalty try Con: Adrian Cashmore (3); Pen: Adrian Cashmore (3)

Kings Park Stadium, Durban
Attendance: 52,000
Referee: Andre Watson (South Africa)

12 May 1996

ACT Brumbies	70–26	Otago Highlanders
Try: Mitch Hardy (3); Brett Robinson; David Giffin; Ipolito Fenukitau; Joe Roff; Owen Finegan; Penalty try Con: David Knox (6); Joe Roff (2); Pen: David Knox (3)	Scoreboard	Try: Chris England; Jeff Wilson; Kupu Vanisi; Con: Jeff Wilson; Pen: Jeff Wilson (3)

Canberra Stadium, Canberra
Referee: Wayne Erickson (Australia)

== Finals ==
Semi-finals
18 May – Brisbane
Queensland Reds	25
Natal Sharks	43
19 May – Auckland
Auckland Blues	48
Northern Transvaal	11

Final
25 May – Auckland
Auckland Blues	45
Natal Sharks	21

=== Semi-finals ===
18 May 1996

Queensland Reds	25–43	Natal Sharks
Try: Michael Foley; Tim Horan; Penalty try Con: John Eales (2); Pen: John Eales (2)	Scoreboard	Try: Cabous van der Westhuizen (3); André Joubert (2); Jeremy Thomson; Wikus van Heerden; Con: André Joubert (2); Henry Honiball (2)

Ballymore Stadium, Brisbane
Referee: Paddy O'Brien (New Zealand)

19 May 1996

Auckland Blues	48–11	Northern Transvaal
Try: Jonah Lomu (2); Adrian Cashmore; Joeli Vidiri; Johnny Ngauamo; Ofisa Tonu'u; Robin Brooke; Sean Fitzpatrick; Con: Adrian Cashmore (4)	Scoreboard	Try: Conrad Breytenbach; Pen: Jannie Kruger (2)

Eden Park, Auckland
Attendance: 42,000
Referee: Wayne Erickson (Australia)

=== Final ===
25 May 1996

Auckland Blues	45–21	Natal Sharks
Try: Andrew Blowers (2); Carlos Spencer; Charles Riechelmann; Eroni Clarke; Jonah Lomu; Con: Adrian Cashmore (3); Pen: Adrian Cashmore (3)	Scoreboard	Try: André Joubert; James Small; Con: Henry Honiball; Pen: Henry Honiball (3)

Eden Park, Auckland
Attendance: 46,000
Referee: Wayne Erickson (Australia)

Blues	Sharks

FB	15	Adrian Cashmore
RW	14	Joeli Vidiri
OC	13	Eroni Clarke
IC	12	Johnny Ngauamo
LW	11	Jonah Lomu
FH	10	Carlos Spencer
SH	9	Ofisa Tonu'u
N8	8	Zinzan Brooke (c)
OF	7	Andrew Blowers
BF	6	Michael Jones
RL	5	Charles Riechelmann
LL	4	Robin Brooke
TP	3	Olo Brown
HK	2	Sean Fitzpatrick
LP	1	Craig Dowd
Substitutes:
CE	16	Lee Stensness
FH	17	Cameron Rackham
SH	18	Michael Scott
LK	19	Jason Chandler
PR	20	Kevin Nepia
HK	21	Andrew Roose
Coach:
Graham Henry

FB	15	André Joubert
RW	14	James Small
OC	13	Jeremy Thomson
IC	12	Dick Muir
LW	11	Cabous van der Westhuizen
FH	10	Henry Honiball
SH	9	Kevin Putt
N8	8	Gary Teichmann (c)
OF	7	Wikus van Heerden
BF	6	Wayne Fyvie
RL	5	Mark Andrews
LL	4	Steve Atherton
TP	3	Adrian Garvey
HK	2	John Allan
LP	1	Ollie le Roux
Substitutes:
WG	16	Joos Joubert
FH	17	Roland de Marigny
SH	18	Robert du Preez
FL	19	Dieter Kriese
LK	20	John Slade
HK	21	Federico Méndez
Coach:
Ian McIntosh

== Statistics ==
=== Points scorers ===
Player	Team	Total	Points per game													Details
Player	Team	Total	1	2	3	4	5	6	7	8	9	10	11	Semis	Final	Details
Matt Burke	(Australia) NSW Waratahs	157	22	20	19	19	11	6	8	9	7	14	22	DNQ	DNQ	5 try; 27 con; 26 pen
John Eales	(Australia) Queensland Reds	155	2	16	22	7	20	16	15	10	16	11	10	10	DNQ	25 con; 33 pen
Jannie Kruger	(South Africa) Northern Transvaal	139	15	2	39	8	0	0	6	20	15	18	10	6	DNQ	1 try; 16 con; 32 pen; 2 dg
Henry Honiball	(South Africa) Natal Sharks	136	0	0	3	21	9	13	2	16	29	15	13	4	11	3 try; 23 con; 25 pen
Joel Stransky	(South Africa) Western Province	120	DNP	17	10	9	15	7	11	21	20	10	0	DNQ	DNQ	12 con; 34 pen
Gavin Lawless	(South Africa) Transvaal	111	0	3	DNP	11	16	18	5	25	13	14	6	DNQ	DNQ	4 try; 14 con; 21 pen
André Joubert	(South Africa) Natal Sharks	101	18	2	30	0	0	15	5	2	5	5	0	14	5	11 try; 11 con; 8 pen
Jamie Cameron	(New Zealand) Wellington Hurricanes	91	23	13	12	9	19	7	8	DNP	DNP	DNP	DNP	DNQ	DNQ	14 con; 21 pen
Ian Foster	(New Zealand) Waikato Chiefs	89	17	7	10	0	13	0	0	7	16	14	5	DNQ	DNQ	1 try; 18 con; 14 pen; 2 dg
Matthew Cooper	(New Zealand) Otago Highlanders	86	22	0	0	15	0	5	15	5	10	14	DNP	DNQ	DNQ	4 try; 12 con; 14 pen

=== Try scorers ===
Player	Team	Total	Tries per game												
Player	Team	Total	1	2	3	4	5	6	7	8	9	10	11	Semis	Final
James Small	(South Africa) Natal Sharks	13	0	1	3	1	1	3	0	1	1	0	1	0	1
André Joubert	(South Africa) Natal Sharks	11	1	0	1	0	0	3	1	0	1	1	0	2	1
Joeli Vidiri	(New Zealand) Auckland Blues	10	0	0	2	DNP	DNP	DNP	1	1	3	2	0	1	0
Alistair Murdoch	(Australia) NSW Waratahs	8	1	1	0	0	DNP	DNP	0	1	1	1	3	DNQ	DNQ
Andrew Blowers	(New Zealand) Auckland Blues	8	1	2	0	1	2	1	0	0	DNP	0	0	0	1
Ben Tune	(Australia) Queensland Reds	8	2	1	1	1	0	0	0	1	1	0	1	0	DNQ
Jonah Lomu	(New Zealand) Auckland Blues	8	0	1	1	DNP	0	2	1	0	DNP	0	0	2	1
Justin Swart	(South Africa) Western Province	8	1	1	2	0	0	2	0	1	1	0	0	DNQ	DNQ
Joe Roff	(Australia) ACT Brumbies	7	0	0	1	1	4	0	0	0	0	0	1	DNQ	DNQ
Jeremy Thomson	(South Africa) Natal Sharks	7	1	0	0	1	2	0	1	1	DNP	DNP	0	1	0
Christian Cullen	(New Zealand) Wellington Hurricanes	7	0	1	1	DNP	DNP	2	1	1	0	0	1	DNQ	DNQ
Eroni Clarke	(New Zealand) Auckland Blues	7	1	0	1	1	1	0	0	0	1	0	1	0	1

== Bibliography ==
- McIlwraith, Matt (2005). Ten Years of Super 12. Auckland, New Zealand: Hachette Livre. ISBN 1-86971-025-8.
