= 1996 Chiefs (Super Rugby) season =

Chiefs
- 1996 season
- Head coach: Brad Meurant
- Captain: Richard Turner
- Stadium: Waikato Stadium, Hamilton (Rugby Park); Toll Stadium, Whangārei (Lowe Walker Stadium); Rotorua International Stadium, Rotorua
- Placing: 6th
- Record: Won 6, Lost 5
- Top try scorer: All: Eric Rush; Glen Osborne (4)
- Top points scorer: All: Ian Foster (89)

1996 was the first year of the Super 12 tournament and the Waikato Chiefs rugby team. They won 6 of their 11 games and finished 6th overall on the table, but they did not make the playoffs. The team was coached by Brad Meurant and captained by Richard Turner.

== Standings ==
Pos	Team	Pld	W	D	L	PF	PA	PD	BP	Pts
1	(Australia) Queensland Reds	11	9	0	2	320	247	73	5	41
2	(New Zealand) Auckland Blues	11	8	0	3	408	354	54	9	41
3	(South Africa) Northern Transvaal	11	8	0	3	329	208	121	6	38
4	(South Africa) Natal Sharks	11	6	0	5	389	277	112	9	33
5	(Australia) ACT Brumbies	11	7	0	4	306	273	33	4	32
6	(New Zealand) Waikato Chiefs	11	6	0	5	291	269	22	4	28
7	(Australia) NSW Waratahs	11	5	0	6	312	290	22	8	28
8	(New Zealand) Otago Highlanders	11	5	0	6	329	391	−62	6	26
9	(New Zealand) Wellington Hurricanes	11	3	0	8	290	353	−63	5	17
10	(South Africa) Transvaal	11	3	0	8	228	299	−71	4	16
11	(South Africa) Western Province	11	3	1	7	251	353	−101	1	15
12	(New Zealand) Canterbury Crusaders	11	2	1	8	234	373	−139	2	13

== Results ==
Week 1	3 March 1996	Waikato Chiefs (New Zealand)	27–26	(New Zealand) Canterbury Crusaders	Rugby Park, Hamilton
		Try: Glen Osborne, Eric Rush; Con: Ian Foster; Pen: Ian Foster (5)	Scoreboard	Try: Adrian Tukaki, Brad Fleming; Con: Andy Miller (2); Pen: Andy Miller (3); Drop: Andy Miller	Referee: (New Zealand) Glenn Wahlstrom

Week 2	10 March 1996	Queensland Reds (Australia)	26–22	(New Zealand) Waikato Chiefs	Ballymore, Brisbane
		Try: Damian Smith, Ben Tune; Con: John Eales (2); Pen: John Eales (4)	Scoreboard	Try: Joeli Veitayaki, Walter Little, Penalty try Con: Ian Foster (2); Pen: Ian Foster	Referee: (Australia) Mick Keogh

Week 3	17 March 1996	Natal Sharks (South Africa)	63–25	(New Zealand) Waikato Chiefs	King's Park, Durban
		Try: James Small (3), André Joubert, Dick Muir, Joos Joubert, Ollie le Roux; Con: André Joubert (5); Pen: André Joubert (5), Henry Honiball	Scoreboard	Try: Frank Bunce, Richard Turner, Blair Larsen; Con: Ian Foster (2); Pen: Ian Foster; Drop: Ian Foster	Referee: (South Africa) André Watson

Week 4	23 March 1996	Transvaal (South Africa)	26–23	(New Zealand) Waikato Chiefs	Ellis Park, Johannesburg
		Try: Jopie Adlam, Francois Pienaar; Con: Gavin Lawless (2); Pen: Gavin Lawless (4)	Scoreboard	Try: Glen Osborne (2); Con: Warren Burton (2); Pen: Warren Burton (3)	Referee: (South Africa) Tappe Henning

Week 5	30 March 1996	Waikato Chiefs (New Zealand)	44–17	(South Africa) Western Province	Rugby Park, Hamilton
		Try: Milton Going (2), Joeli Veitayaki, Craig Stevenson, Ian Foster; Con: Ian Foster (4), Warren Burton; Pen: Warren Burton (3)	Scoreboard	Try: Justin Swart (2); Con: Joel Stransky (2); Pen: Joel Stransky	Referee: (New Zealand) Steve Walsh

Week 6	3 April 1996	Waikato Chiefs (New Zealand)	26–18	(Australia) ACT Brumbies	Lowe Walker Stadium, Whangārei
		Try: Scott McLeod, Duane Monkley; Con: Warren Burton (2); Pen: Warren Burton (4)	Scoreboard	Try: John Langford, Patricio Noriega; Con: Adam Friend; Pen: Adam Friend (2)	Referee: (New Zealand) Glenn Wahlstrom

Week 7	11 April 1996	Waikato Chiefs (New Zealand)	17–9	(South Africa) Northern Transvaal	Rugby Park, Hamilton
		Try: Glen Osborne, Norm Berryman; Con: Warren Burton (2); Pen: Warren Burton	Scoreboard	Pen: Dawie du Toit, Jannie Kruger; Drop: Jannie Kruger	Referee: (New Zealand) Steve Walsh

Week 8	16 April 1996	Otago Highlanders (New Zealand)	5–22	(New Zealand) Waikato Chiefs	Rugby Park Stadium, Invercargill
		Try: Matthew Cooper	Scoreboard	Try: Paul Mitchell, Richard Turner, Simon Crabb; Con: Ian Foster (2); Pen: Ian Foster	Referee: (New Zealand) Colin Hawke

Week 9	20 April 1996	Auckland Blues (New Zealand)	39–31	(New Zealand) Waikato Chiefs	Eden Park, Auckland
		Try: Joeli Vidiri, Jonah Lomu, Ofisa Tonu'u, Zinzan Brooke, Penalty try Con: Carlos Spencer (3), Adrian Cashmore; Pen: Adrian Cashmore, Carlos Spencer	Scoreboard	Try: Eric Rush, Paul Mitchell, Penalty try Con: Ian Foster (2); Pen: Ian Foster (4)	Referee: (New Zealand) Steve Walsh

Week 10	28 April 1996	Waikato Chiefs (New Zealand)	39–17	(Australia) NSW Waratahs	Rugby Park, Hamilton
		Try: Ian Jones (3), Eric Rush (2); Con: Ian Foster (4); Pen: Ian Foster; Drop: Ian Foster	Scoreboard	Try: Alistair Murdoch, Jason Madz; Con: Matt Burke (2); Pen: Matt Burke	Referee: (New Zealand) Glenn Wahlstrom

Week 11	4 May 1996	Waikato Chiefs (New Zealand)	15–23	(New Zealand) Wellington Hurricanes	Rotorua Int'l Stadium, Rotorua
		Try: Dean Anglesey, Warren Johnston; Con: Ian Foster; Pen: Ian Foster	Scoreboard	Try: Jason O'Halloran, Mark Allen; Con: Jon Preston (2); Pen: Jon Preston (3)	Referee: (New Zealand) Glenn Wahlstrom

== Squad ==
The Chiefs squad for the 1996 Super 12 season were:

1996 Chiefs squad
**Props**: (New Zealand) Craig Stevenson; (Fiji) **Joeli Veitayaki**; (New Zealand) Steve Simpkins; **Hookers**: (New Zealand) Paul Mitchell; (New Zealand) Slade McFarland; **Locks**: (New Zealand) **Mark Cooksley**; (New Zealand) **Glenn Taylor**; (New Zealand) **Ian Jones**; (New Zealand) **Steve Gordon**	**Loose forwards**: (New Zealand) Dean Anglesey; (New Zealand) **Liam Barry**; (New Zealand) **Blair Larsen**; (New Zealand) Duane Monkley; (New Zealand) **Richard Turner**; **Scrum-halves**: (New Zealand) Boyd Gillespie; (New Zealand) Simon Crabb; **Fly-halves**: (New Zealand) Ian Foster; (New Zealand) Warren Burton; (New Zealand) Warren Johnston	**Midfield**: (New Zealand) **Frank Bunce**; (New Zealand) **Scott McLeod**; (New Zealand) **Walter Little**; **Wingers**: (New Zealand) **Norm Berryman**; (New Zealand) **Eric Rush**; (New Zealand) Milton Going; (New Zealand) Peter Woods; **Fullbacks**: (New Zealand) **Glen Osborne**
(c) denotes team captain, **Bold** denotes player is internationally capped.

== Player statistics ==
Player	Apps	Tries	Cons	Pens	DGs	Pts
Blair Larsen	10	1	—	—	—	5
Boyd Gillespie	7	—	—	—	—	—
Craig Stevenson	11	—	—	—	—	—
Dean Anglesey	3	1	—	—	—	5
Duane Monkley	9	1	—	—	—	5
Eric Rush	9	4	—	—	—	20
Frank Bunce	11	1	—	—	—	5
Glen Osborne	8	4	—	—	—	20
Glenn Taylor	3	—	—	—	—	—
Ian Foster	8	2	18	15	1	94
Ian Jones	11	3	—	—	—	15
Joeli Veitayaki	11	2	—	—	—	10
Liam Barry	6	—	—	—	—	—
Mark Cooksley	6	—	—	—	—	—
Milton Going	3	2	—	—	—	10
Norm Berryman	9	1	—	—	—	5
Paul Mitchell	7	2	—	—	—	10
Peter Woods	3	—	—	—	—	—
Richard Turner	9	2	—	—	—	10
Scott McLeod	6	1	—	—	—	5
Simon Crabb	5	1	—	—	—	5
Slade McFarland	6	—	—	—	—	—
Steve Gordon	2	—	—	—	—	—
Steve Moore	0	—	—	—	—	—
Steve Simpkins	3	—	—	—	—	—
Walter Little	7	1	—	—	—	5
Warren Burton	5	0	7	11	0	47
Warren Johnston	3	1	—	—	—	5
penalty try	—	2	—	—	—	10
Total	11	32	25	26	1	291
