= List of Crusaders (rugby union) players =

This is a list of rugby union footballers who have played for the Crusaders in Super Rugby. The list includes any player that has played in a regular season match, semi-final or final for the Crusaders.

Players are listed alphabetically.

List is updated up as of end of 2026 season. As of end of 2026 season, 313 individuals have played for the Crusaders. The latest player to debut for the Crusaders is Gus Brown, Crusader #313.

== Players ==
No.	Name	Caps	Tries	C	P	DG	Points	Debut	Last
1	Stu Loe	26						03/03/1996	30/05/1998
2	Matt Sexton	35	1				5	03/03/1996	12/05/2001
3	Con Barrell	45						03/03/1996	14/04/2001
4	Chris Hammett	4						03/03/1996	22/03/1996
5	Mark Weedon	19						03/03/1996	17/05/1997
6	Dean Coleman	8						03/03/1996	05/05/1996
7	Angus Gardiner	38	3				15	03/03/1996	30/05/1999
8	Todd Blackadder	71	6				30	03/03/1996	12/05/2001
9	Justin Marshall	105	23			1	118	03/03/1996	28/05/2005
10	Andy Miller	7		10	18	1	77	03/03/1996	05/05/1996
11	Brad Fleming	5	2				10	03/03/1996	14/04/1996
12	Mark Mayerhofler	53	10	1			52	03/03/1996	27/05/2000
13	Tabai Matson	25	6				30	03/03/1996	30/05/1998
14	Daryl Gibson	77	15				75	03/03/1996	25/05/2002
15	Simon Forrest	4	1		1		8	03/03/1996	29/03/1996
16	Adrian Tukaki	7	3				15	03/03/1996	05/05/1996
17	Graeme Dempster	4		1	3		11	10/03/1996	23/04/1996
18	Mark Hammett	81	7				35	17/03/1996	24/05/2003
19	Grant Kelly	1						17/03/1996	17/03/1996
20	Richard Loe	9	2				10	17/03/1996	17/05/1997
21	Norm Maxwell	75	2				10	17/03/1996	16/04/2005
22	Filipe Rayasi	1						17/03/1996	17/03/1996
23	Paula Bale	13	1				5	17/03/1996	17/05/1997
24	Deon Muir	4						17/03/1996	08/04/1996
25	Scott Hansen	2						22/03/1996	08/04/1996
26	Scott Robertson	86	16				80	22/03/1996	24/05/2003
27	Tim Stokes	1						22/03/1996	22/03/1996
28	Greg Coffey	3		3	5		21	29/03/1996	08/04/1996
29	Danny Love	1						29/03/1996	29/03/1996
30	Damon Kaui	6	3				15	03/04/1996	05/05/1996
31	Richard Kirke	3						03/04/1996	27/04/1996
32	Pita Alatini	5	2				10	08/04/1996	05/05/1996
33	Pat Lam	3						23/04/1996	05/05/1996
34	James Kerr	26	6				30	07/03/1997	15/05/1999
35	Steve Lancaster	26	1				5	07/03/1997	20/05/2000
36	Daryl Lilley	29	8	7	9		81	07/03/1997	30/05/1999
37	Leon MacDonald	122	42	27	21	1	330	07/03/1997	23/05/2009
38	Kevin Nepia	21	3				15	07/03/1997	30/05/1998
39	Steve Surridge	29	1				5	07/03/1997	30/05/1999
40	John Akurangi	2						07/03/1997	14/03/1997
41	Clark McLeod	21	1				5	07/03/1997	09/05/1999
42	Aaron Flynn	24	1				5	14/03/1997	28/04/2000
43	Andrew Mehrtens	87	13	134	202	17	990	29/03/1997	28/05/2005
44	Milton Going	6						04/04/1997	27/03/1998
45	Isaac Fe'aunati	2						04/04/1997	12/04/1997
46	Julian White	1						19/04/1997	19/04/1997
47	Afato So'oalo	26	17				85	25/04/1997	12/05/2001
48	Reuben Thorne	129	6				30	17/05/1997	31/05/2008
49	Norm Berryman	30	15				75	28/02/1998	12/05/2000
50	Graham Jack	4						28/02/1998	05/04/1998
51	Tony Marsh	9	1				5	28/02/1998	30/05/1998
52	Sam Johnstone	1						28/02/1998	28/02/1998
53	Greg Feek	63	5				25	27/03/1998	13/05/2005
54	Elton Moncrieff	2						05/04/1998	11/04/1998
55	Ace Tiatia	2						18/04/1998	16/05/1998
56	Blair Feeney	1						30/05/1998	30/05/1998
57	Caleb Ralph	126	52				260	26/02/1999	17/05/2008
58	Greg Somerville	115	9				45	26/02/1999	31/05/2008
59	Dave Hewett	70	3				15	26/02/1999	28/05/2005
60	Nathan Mauger	29	4				20	26/02/1999	03/04/2004
61	Sean Cuttance	1						26/02/1999	26/02/1999
62	Jason Mathie	1						05/03/1999	05/03/1999
63	Chris Jack	110	7				35	19/03/1999	29/05/2011
64	Ron Cribb	15	7				35	18/04/1999	27/05/2000
65	Marika Vunibaka	50	35				175	27/02/2000	22/05/2004
66	Aaron Mauger	89	22	10	2	6	154	27/02/2000	12/05/2007
67	Dallas Seymour	13	1				5	10/03/2000	08/04/2001
68	Slade McFarland	13						18/03/2000	01/05/2004
69	Mark Robinson	23	3				15	15/04/2000	25/05/2002
70	Ben Hurst	18	3				15	20/05/2000	16/05/2003
71	Billy Fulton	1						20/05/2000	20/05/2000
72	Ben Blair	28	7	20	28		159	23/02/2001	22/05/2004
73	Sam Broomhall	55	3				15	23/02/2001	28/05/2005
74	Rico Gear	40	30				150	23/02/2001	12/05/2007
75	Brad Thorn	92	10				50	23/02/2001	09/07/2011
76	Andrew Hore	6						10/03/2001	22/04/2001
77	Richie McCaw	145	27				135	31/03/2001	13/06/2015
78	Joe Maddock	16	3				15	23/02/2002	24/05/2003
79	Brad Mika	12	2				10	23/02/2002	05/05/2006
80	Corey Flynn	151	20				100	09/03/2002	02/08/2014
81	Johnny Leo'o	48	6				30	12/04/2002	12/05/2007
82	Nick White	1						12/04/2002	12/04/2002
83	Matt Mustchin	1						04/05/2002	04/05/2002
84	Dan Carter	141	36	287	307	11	1708	22/02/2003	13/06/2015
85	Chris King	25	1				5	22/02/2003	15/06/2018
86	Bryce Williams	2						22/02/2003	28/02/2003
87	Scott Hamilton	58	21				105	22/02/2003	31/05/2008
88	Hayden Pedersen	1						03/05/2003	03/05/2003
89	Mose Tuiali'i	65	14				70	21/02/2004	31/05/2008
90	Tony Koonwaiyou	7						21/02/2004	05/03/2005
91	Jamie Nutbrown	15	1				5	21/02/2004	20/05/2005
92	Cameron McIntyre	17	2	2	1		17	20/03/2004	20/05/2006
93	Tone Kopelani	31	1				5	20/03/2004	20/05/2006
94	Campbell Johnstone	38	2				10	27/03/2004	15/03/2008
95	Casey Laulala	61	20				100	10/04/2004	03/04/2009
96	Ross Filipo	45	8				40	24/04/2004	25/04/2009
97	Scott Waldrom	1						07/05/2004	07/05/2004
98	Kevin O'Neill	13						26/02/2005	17/02/2007
99	Sam Harding	8						26/02/2005	29/04/2005
100	Vilimoni Delasau	4						05/03/2005	20/05/2005
101	Craig Clarke	3						12/03/2005	05/05/2006
102	Tiʻi Paulo	34	5				25	16/04/2005	22/05/2010
103	Kevin Senio	25	2				10	11/02/2006	12/05/2007
104	Wyatt Crockett	203	11				55	11/02/2006	21/07/2018
105	Andy Ellis	155	27			3	144	18/02/2006	23/07/2016
106	Steven Yates	1						18/02/2006	18/02/2006
107	Stephen Brett	39	4	31	26	1	163	04/03/2006	23/05/2009
108	Ben Franks	82	2				10	10/03/2006	27/07/2012
109	Tanerau Latimer	5	3				15	21/04/2006	20/05/2006
110	Kieran Read	157	25				125	02/02/2007	06/07/2019
111	Brent Ward	9	2		2		16	02/02/2007	18/06/2011
112	Rua Tipoki	6	1				5	02/02/2007	20/04/2007
113	Peter Nixon	3						02/02/2007	17/03/2007
114	Jake Paringatai	4						02/02/2007	24/02/2007
115	Michael Paterson	21						17/02/2007	16/05/2009
116	Ben May	2						17/02/2007	24/02/2007
117	Tim Bateman	51	8				40	24/02/2007	03/05/2019
118	Isaac Ross	23	3				15	24/02/2007	20/03/2010
119	Tusi Pisi	1						17/03/2007	17/03/2007
120	Kahn Fotuali'i	36	8			1	43	15/02/2008	09/07/2011
121	Kade Poki	15	2				10	15/02/2008	25/04/2009
122	Ali Williams	15	3				15	15/02/2008	31/05/2008
123	Sean Maitland	54	23				115	15/02/2008	21/07/2012
124	Nasi Manu	15	1				5	22/02/2008	03/04/2009
125	Hamish Gard	9		1	3		11	22/02/2008	23/05/2009
126	George Whitelock	86	8				40	12/04/2008	17/06/2014
127	Steve Alfeld	2						12/04/2008	14/05/2011
128	Jared Payne	23	2				10	14/02/2009	22/05/2010
129	Colin Slade	57	8	51	68		346	14/02/2009	13/06/2015
130	Thomas Waldrom	26	4				20	14/02/2009	22/05/2010
131	Bronson Murray	11						14/02/2009	08/05/2009
132	Jason Macdonald	13	1				5	20/02/2009	23/05/2009
133	Adam Whitelock	56	7				35	14/02/2009	17/06/2014
134	Ryan Crotty	156	25	1			127	27/02/2009	31/05/2024
135	Dan Perrin	7	1				5	27/02/2009	22/05/2010
136	Tyson Keats	3						27/02/2009	03/04/2009
137	Blair Cook	2						07/03/2009	21/03/2009
138	Owen Franks	163	3				15	14/03/2009	31/05/2024
139	Jonathan Poff	19	1				5	28/03/2009	25/06/2011
140	Robbie Fruean	66	15				75	13/02/2010	06/06/2015
141	Zac Guildford	61	22				110	13/02/2010	27/07/2013
142	Sam Whitelock	182	9				45	13/02/2010	24/06/2023
143	Quentin MacDonald	27	3				15	13/02/2010	02/03/2024
144	Peter Borlase	2						13/02/2010	06/03/2010
145	Joe Wheeler	4						26/02/2010	21/05/2011
146	Willi Heinz	72	7	1			37	12/03/2010	29/03/2024
147	Daniel Bowden	6						17/04/2010	22/05/2010
148	Tu Umaga-Marshall	2						17/04/2010	19/02/2011
149	Israel Dagg	89	27	1	1		140	19/02/2011	14/07/2018
150	Matt Todd	141	29				145	19/02/2011	06/07/2019
151	Sonny Bill Williams	15	5				25	04/03/2011	09/07/2011
152	Matt Berquist	13		15	13	1	72	04/03/2011	02/07/2011
153	Tom Marshall	43	6				30	04/03/2011	27/07/2013
154	Luke Romano	136	10				50	09/04/2011	04/06/2021
155	David Hall	1						25/04/2011	25/04/2011
156	Tom Donnelly	19						24/02/2012	12/07/2013
157	Tyler Bleyendaal	21	2	10	27		111	24/02/2012	17/06/2014
158	Tom Taylor	58	5	27	65		274	09/03/2012	13/06/2015
159	Luke Whitelock	51	3				15	09/03/2012	06/06/2015
160	Brendon O'Connor	3	1				5	24/03/2012	15/05/2021
161	Ross Kennedy	1						24/03/2012	24/03/2012
162	Ben Funnell	93	8				40	29/04/2012	08/06/2019
163	Dominic Bird	31	1				5	01/03/2013	06/06/2015
164	Joe Moody	127	4				20	01/03/2013	31/05/2024
165	Johnny McNicholl	61	28				140	08/03/2013	12/06/2026
166	Codie Taylor	158	54				270	23/03/2013	12/06/2026
167	Jordan Taufua	101	14				70	30/03/2013	06/07/2019
168	Shane Christie	1						13/04/2013	13/04/2013
169	Telusa Veainu	4	1				5	13/04/2013	12/07/2013
170	Nepo Laulala	34	1				5	24/05/2013	13/06/2015
171	Jimmy Tupou	38						31/05/2013	23/07/2016
172	Tim Perry	26	1				5	21/02/2014	08/06/2019
173	Rey Lee-Lo	6						21/02/2014	17/06/2014
174	Nafi Tuitavake	21	1				5	21/02/2014	13/06/2015
175	Rob Thompson	3						28/02/2014	28/06/2014
176	Kieron Fonotia	40	4				20	08/03/2014	23/07/2016
177	Nemani Nadolo	39	27	4			143	14/03/2014	16/07/2016
178	Mitchell Drummond	151	22	1			112	14/03/2014	03/04/2026
179	Daniel Lienert-Brown	2						05/04/2014	13/04/2014
180	Joel Everson	1						17/06/2014	17/06/2014
181	Scott Barrett	132	20				100	17/06/2014	21/06/2025
182	Siate Tokolahi	1						17/06/2014	17/06/2014
183	Nathaniel Apa	2						13/02/2015	28/02/2015
184	Alex Hodgman	9	1				5	28/02/2015	23/07/2016
185	David Havili	155	37	11	4	1	222	14/03/2015	12/06/2026
186	Jone Macilai-Tori	16	7				35	08/05/2015	15/06/2018
187	Billy Guyton	1						13/06/2015	13/06/2015
188	Tim Boys	10						27/02/2016	28/05/2016
189	Sean Wainui	9						27/02/2016	15/07/2017
190	Richie Mo'unga	109	33	319	140	3	1232	27/02/2016	24/06/2023
191	Leon Fukofuka	5						27/02/2016	14/04/2017
192	Ben Volavola	7	1	3			11	27/02/2016	23/07/2016
193	Reed Prinsep	1						27/02/2016	27/02/2016
194	Michael Alaalatoa	97	5				25	04/03/2016	12/06/2021
195	Pete Samu	33	9				45	04/03/2016	04/08/2018
196	Ged Robinson	4						19/03/2016	20/05/2016
197	Marty McKenzie	9	1	7			19	24/04/2016	14/04/2017
198	Mitch Hunt	45	6	49	6	1	149	09/07/2016	06/07/2019
199	George Bridge	83	37				185	25/02/2017	18/06/2022
200	Whetu Douglas	40	7				35	25/02/2017	12/06/2021
201	Ere Enari	9						25/02/2017	15/05/2021
202	Jack Goodhue	81	13				65	25/02/2017	24/06/2023
203	Seta Tamanivalu	33	15				75	25/02/2017	04/08/2018
204	Jed Brown	6	2				10	25/02/2017	10/06/2017
205	Bryn Hall	93	18	2			94	25/02/2017	18/06/2022
206	Heiden Bedwell-Curtis	21	4				20	11/03/2017	04/08/2018
207	Digby Ioane	3	1				5	11/03/2017	02/04/2017
208	Oli Jager	54	2				10	11/03/2017	24/06/2023
209	Manasa Mataele	32	17				85	17/03/2017	12/06/2021
210	Mitchell Dunshea	38	3				15	24/03/2017	24/02/2023
211	Andrew Makalio	43	4				20	14/04/2017	09/08/2020
212	Quinten Strange	74	5				25	14/04/2017	23/05/2025
213	Vernon Fredericks	1						19/05/2017	19/05/2017
214	Billy Harmon	12	1				5	24/02/2018	01/08/2020
215	Mike Delany	6		7			14	10/03/2018	15/06/2018
216	Brett Cameron	13		8	1		19	23/03/2018	09/08/2020
217	Braydon Ennor	84	27				135	23/03/2018	12/06/2026
218	Tom Sanders	26	1				5	23/03/2018	12/06/2021
219	Donald Brighouse	6						07/04/2018	14/07/2018
220	Ethan Blackadder	64	11				55	21/04/2018	12/06/2026
221	Jack Stratton	2	1				5	21/04/2018	15/06/2018
222	Harry Allan	12						21/04/2018	18/05/2019
223	Tima Fainga'anuku	2						02/06/2018	15/06/2018
224	Hamish Dalzell	2						15/06/2018	30/04/2022
225	Rameka Poihipi	1	1				5	15/06/2018	15/06/2018
226	Caleb Makene	1						15/06/2018	15/06/2018
227	Sebastian Siataga	2						15/06/2018	28/07/2018
228	Ryan Coxon	1						15/06/2018	15/06/2018
229	Sam Beard	1						15/06/2018	15/06/2018
230	Sam Anderson-Heather	1						14/07/2018	14/07/2018
231	Will Jordan	73	49				245	16/02/2019	22/05/2026
232	George Bower	104	1				5	09/03/2019	12/06/2026
233	Sevu Reece	102	74	1		1	375	09/03/2019	12/06/2026
234	Isi Tuʻungafasi	12						23/03/2019	04/06/2021
235	Leicester Fainga'anuku	70	37				185	06/04/2019	12/06/2026
236	Ngane Punivai	1						26/04/2019	26/04/2019
237	Brodie McAlister	40	6				30	25/05/2019	04/05/2024
238	Isaiah Punivai	2						08/06/2019	04/03/2022
239	Tom Christie	72	11				55	01/02/2020	21/06/2025
240	Cullen Grace	68	13				65	01/02/2020	21/06/2025
241	Sione Havili Talitui	35	6				30	14/02/2020	24/06/2023
242	Ethan Roots	1						21/02/2020	21/02/2020
243	Dallas McLeod	67	9				45	06/03/2020	06/06/2026
244	Fergus Burke	37	8	38	6		134	14/03/2020	31/05/2024
245	Hugh Roach	1						14/03/2020	14/03/2020
246	Fetuli Paea	4						04/07/2020	01/08/2020
247	Chay Fihaki	57	19	14	3		132	26/02/2021	12/06/2026
248	Josh McKay	2						26/02/2021	04/06/2021
249	Fletcher Newell	59	3				15	26/02/2021	12/06/2026
250	Tamaiti Williams	59	10				50	25/04/2021	28/02/2026
251	Liam Allen	1						29/05/2021	29/05/2021
252	Nathan Vella	3						29/05/2021	12/06/2021
253	Simon Hickey	5		7			14	19/02/2022	20/05/2022
254	Shilo Klein	5	1				5	19/02/2022	20/05/2022
255	Pablo Matera	14	1				5	19/02/2022	18/06/2022
256	Corey Kellow	36	3				15	25/02/2022	18/04/2026
257	Inga Finau	1						04/03/2022	04/03/2022
258	Dominic Gardiner	39	3				15	04/03/2022	12/06/2026
260	Kini Naholo	1						04/03/2022	04/03/2022
261	Abraham Pole	2	1				5	04/03/2022	12/03/2022
262	Te Toiroa Tahuriorangi	6						04/03/2022	27/05/2022
263	Finlay Brewis	18						26/03/2022	12/06/2026
264	Zach Gallagher	19						01/04/2022	15/03/2024
265	Ricky Jackson	7						09/04/2022	27/05/2022
266	George Bell	32	11				55	07/05/2022	08/05/2026
267	Seb Calder	35	1				5	07/05/2022	29/05/2026
268	Liam Hallam-Eames	1						07/05/2022	07/05/2022
269	Christian Lio-Willie	59	16				80	24/02/2023	12/06/2026
270	Macca Springer	31	16				80	24/02/2023	12/06/2026
271	Noah Hotham	47	11				55	03/03/2023	12/06/2026
272	Taha Kemara	27	1	52	5		124	11/03/2023	12/06/2026
273	Ioane Moananu	17	7				35	11/03/2023	16/05/2025
274	Kershawl Sykes-Martin	17						11/03/2023	18/04/2026
275	Pepesana Patafilo	5						18/03/2023	27/05/2023
276	Will Gualter	5						24/03/2023	27/05/2023
277	Jamie Hannah	39	2				10	24/03/2023	12/06/2026
278	Melani Nanai	1						07/04/2023	07/04/2023
279	Andrew Turner	2						06/05/2023	19/05/2023
280	John Afoa	2						27/05/2023	03/06/2023
281	Reuben O'Neill	5						27/05/2023	24/06/2023
282	Louie Chapman	6						03/06/2023	18/04/2026
283	Joel Lam	1						03/06/2023	03/06/2023
284	Levi Aumua	20	2				10	23/02/2024	30/05/2025
285	Rivez Reihana	29	5	43	15		156	23/02/2024	12/06/2026
286	Tahlor Cahill	25						09/03/2024	12/06/2026
287	Riley Hohepa	6		6	7		33	09/03/2024	20/04/2024
288	Heremaia Murray	3						09/03/2024	31/05/2024
289	Jone Rova	3						09/03/2024	25/05/2024
290	Fletcher Anderson	2						23/03/2024	29/03/2025
291	Leigh Halfpenny	1		1			2	04/05/2024	04/05/2024
292	Antonio Shalfoon	33	3				15	11/05/2024	12/06/2026
293	Taine Robinson	2						18/05/2024	31/05/2024
294	Kyle Preston	25	8				40	14/02/2025	12/06/2026
295	James O'Connor	16	1	14	5		48	14/02/2025	21/06/2025
296	Sam Matenga	3						14/02/2025	09/03/2025
297	Manumaua Letiu	11	2				10	14/02/2025	12/06/2026
298	Xavier Saifoloi	6						15/03/2025	21/03/2026
299	Matt Moulds	2						22/03/2025	11/04/2025
300	Aki Tuivailala	1						29/03/2025	29/03/2025
301	Lewis Ponini	1						30/05/2025	30/05/2025
302	James White	2						22/02/2026	28/02/2026
303	Will Tucker	2						07/03/2026	14/03/2026
304	Johnny Lee	8	2				10	14/03/2026	29/05/2026
305	Cooper Grant	2		1			2	21/03/2026	08/05/2026
306	Kurtis MacDonald	3	1				5	21/03/2026	08/05/2026
307	Jack Sexton	6						03/04/2026	12/06/2026
308	Oli Mathis	2						18/04/2026	29/05/2026
309	Toby Bell	1						18/04/2026	18/04/2026
310	Maloni Kunawave	1						24/03/2026	24/03/2026
311	Liam Jack	2						22/05/2026	29/05/2026
312	Cooper Roberts	1						29/05/2026	29/05/2026
313	Gus Brown	1						06/06/2026	06/06/2026
