= List of New South Wales Waratahs seasons =

This is a list of all professional seasons played by the New South Wales Waratahs in Australian rugby, from their inaugural season in 1996 to their last completed season (2026). It details their record in every major competition entered, as well as the top try-scorers for each season and top point-scorers.

In total, the Waratahs have one Super Rugby title.

== Seasons ==
New South Wales Waratahs professional season-by-season record
Competition	Season	New South Wales Waratahs record											Top try scorer		Top point scorer	
Competition	Season	Pos	Finals	P	W	L	D	F	A	Diff.	BP	Pts	Name	Tries	Name	Points
Super 12	1996	7th	—N/a	11	5	6	0	312	290	+22	8	28	Alistair Murdoch	8	Matt Burke	157
Super 12	1997	9th	—N/a	11	4	7	0	255	296	−41	4	20	Alistair Murdoch	5	Matt Burke	150
Super 12	1998	6th	—N/a	11	6	4	1	306	276	+30	4	30	Semi Taupeaafe	5	Manny Edmonds	96
Super 12	1999	8th	—N/a	11	4	6	1	246	248	−2	6	24	Matthew Dowling	6	Matthew Dowling	56
Super 12	2000	9th	—N/a	11	5	6	0	273	258	+15	5	25	Scott Staniforth	6	Matt Burke	158
Super 12	2001	8th	—N/a	11	5	6	0	306	302	+4	5	25	Luke Inman	5	Matt Burke	129
Super 12	2002	2nd	Semi-finals	12	8	4	0	347	335	+12	7	39	Scott Staniforth	9	Matt Burke	143
Super 12	2003	5th	—N/a	11	6	5	0	313	344	−31	7	31	Lote Tuqiri (Note: Tuqiri represented both Australia and Fiji in international rugby league. Before switching codes and later becoming an Australian international in rugby union, he most recently represented Australia in rugby league in 2002.)	5	Matt Burke	80
Super 12	2004	8th	—N/a	11	5	6	0	342	274	+68	7	27	Lote Tuqiri	7	Mat Rogers	82
Super 12	2005	2nd	Runners-up	13	10	3	0	370	222	+148	5	41	Peter Hewat	10	Peter Hewat	173
Super 14	2006	3rd	Semi-finals	14	9	5	0	376	208	+168	9	45	Peter Hewat	5	Peter Hewat	191
Super 14	2007	13th	—N/a	13	3	9	1	266	317	−51	7	21	Lachlan Turner	3	Peter Hewat	156
Super 14	2008	2nd	Runners-up	15	10	4	1	295	219	+76	5	43	Lachlan Turner; Wycliff Palu	6	Kurtley Beale	102
Super 14	2009	5th	—N/a	13	9	4	0	241	212	+29	5	41	Lachlan Turner	6	Daniel Halangahu	63
Super 14	2010	3rd	Semi-finals	14	9	5	0	391	313	+78	7	43	Drew Mitchell	9	Berrick Barnes	103
Super Rugby	2011	5th	Qualifying final	16	10	7	0	411	278	+133	9	57	Tom Carter; Drew Mitchell	6	Kurtley Beale	167
Super Rugby	2012	11th	—N/a	16	4	12	0	346	407	–61	10	34	Tom Kingston; Rob Horne	4	Brendan McKibbin (Note: McKibbin was born in Scotland and raised in Australia from a young age. He was called-up to a Wallabies camp in late 2012, although was not internationally capped.)	94
Super Rugby	2013	9th	—N/a	16	8	8	0	411	371	+40	5	45	Israel Folau; Cam Crawford	8	Brendan McKibbin	139
Super Rugby	2014	1st	Winners	18	14	4	0	540	312	+228	10	58	Israel Folau	12	Bernard Foley	252
Super Rugby	2015	2nd	Semi-finals	17	11	6	0	426	348	+78	8	52	Taqele Naiyaravoro (Note: Naiyaravoro was born in Fiji and represented the Fiji rugby league team between 2011 and 2013. He made his Test debut for Australia in a 2015 Rugby World Cup warm-up match in September 2015, 63 days after the 2015 Super Rugby season had concluded.)	8	Bernard Foley	181
Super Rugby	2016	10th	—N/a	15	8	7	0	413	317	+96	8	40	Israel Folau	11	Bernard Foley	120
Super Rugby	2017	16th	—N/a	15	4	11	0	396	522	−126	3	19	Israel Folau	9	Bernard Foley	113
Super Rugby	2018	3rd	Semi-finals	18	10	7	1	557	445	+112	6	44	Taqele Naiyaravoro	15	Bernard Foley	223
Super Rugby	2019	12th	—N/a	16	6	10	0	367	415	−48	6	30	Curtis Rona	6	Bernard Foley	137
Super Rugby	~~2020~~ (Note: The 2020 season was cancelled after seven rounds of play due to the COVID-19 pandemic.)	~~14th~~	—N/a	6	1	5	0	104	214	–110	1	5	Mark Nawaqanitawase	4	Will Harrison	29
Super Rugby AU	2020	4th	—N/a	8	4	4	0	204	189	+15	3	19	Jake Gordon	4	Will Harrison	97
Super Rugby AU	2021	5th	—N/a	8	0	8	0	138	292	–154	3	3	Jack Maddocks	3	Will Harrison	39
Super Rugby Trans-Tasman	2021	10th	—N/a	5	0	5	0	127	265	–138	0	0	Jack Maddocks	3	Will Harrison	34
Super Rugby Pacific	2022	6th	Quarter-finals	15	8	7	0	380	356	+24	6	38	Will Harris; Mark Nawaqanitawase	7	Tane Edmed	69
Super Rugby Pacific	2023	8th	Quarter-finals	15	6	9	0	399	449	–50	7	31	Mark Nawaqanitawase	8	Ben Donaldson	80
Super Rugby Pacific	2024	12th	—N/a	14	2	12	0	306	434	−128	5	13	Jake Gordon; Dylan Pietsch; Lachlan Swinton	4	Tane Edmed	91
Super Rugby Pacific	2025	8th	—N/a	14	6	8	0	317	451	−134	2	26	Langi Gleeson; Triston Reilly	7	Tane Edmed	41
Super Rugby Pacific	2026	8th	—N/a	14	5	9	0	353	402	−49	8	28	Max Jorgensen	8	Sid Harvey	98

== Bibliography ==
- Howitt, Bob (2005). SANZAR Saga: Ten Years of Super 12 and Tri-Nations Rugby. Auckland: HarperCollins. ISBN 1-86950-566-2.
