= History of the Highlanders (rugby union) =

The history of the Highlanders focuses on the rugby union team in the Super Rugby competitions. The team was originally formed as one of five New Zealand franchises for the Super 12 in 1996. The team encompassed the provinces of North Otago, Otago and Southland. The Highlanders placed eighth in their first year with five wins, but slumped to last in the competition in 1997 with only three wins. They improved to qualify for their first semi-final in 1998, and became the first New Zealand team to defeat all four South African franchises in the process. They were defeated by eventual 1998 Champions the Auckland Blues in their semi-final however. Their best ever finish came in 1999 when they won eight matches, and their semi-final to host the 1999 Super 12 Final at Carisbrook, but lost to South Island rivals Crusaders in the match. They qualified for their third consecutive semi-finals in 2000, and this time played the Crusaders in Christchurch, but lost again.

In 2001 they could not repeat a play-off performance, they did finish fifth and maintain an unbeaten record at Carisbrook for the second season in a row. In 2002 the Gordon Hunter Memorial Trophy was introduced to be contested with the Blues, and the Highlanders won the trophy with a 20–13 win at Eden Park. They did this on their way to finishing fourth, before again losing to the Crusaders in their semi-final. In 2003 they lost their first match at Carisbrook since the 1999 Super 12 final when the Crusaders defeated them 17–16. Coach Laurie Mains resigned at the end of that season after a dispute with some of the senior players, including Anton Oliver. In 2004, their first season with coach Greg Cooper, they finished ninth despite scoring more tries then in 2003. This was mainly due to their defence as they conceded 12 more tries then in 2003. Despite winning six consecutive games in 2005, they eventually finished eighth due to losing their last three matches.

After the expansion of the Super 12 to the Super 14 with the addition of two teams—one each from Australia and South Africa. In both the 2006 and 2007 seasons the Highlander's finished ninth with 27 competition points when they won six and five matches respectively. Following their 2007 season coach Greg Cooper left the franchise, and was replaced by Glenn Moore. Moore coached the team for three seasons, but achieved only ten wins during that time, and finished no higher than ninth. Jamie Joseph was appointed coach for the 2011 season, and under him finished eighth that season, and ninth the following year.

== Origin of name ==
The name Highlanders was chosen after the early Scottish settlers in the lower South Island. These Scottish settlers were the founders of Dunedin—known as the "Edinburgh of the South", and the city where the Highlanders are based. According to the Highlanders official website: " The name and image of the Highlander conjures up visions of fierce independence, pride in one's roots, loyalty, strength, kinship, honesty, and hard work." The colours of the Highlanders encompasses the provincial colours of North Otago, Otago, and Southland; yellow, blue and maroon. Blue is also the predominant colour of the Flag of Scotland, and is used by many sports teams in that country.

== Beginnings: 1996 and 1997 ==
The Highlanders' franchise was created as one of five New Zealand teams in the Super 12. Originally named the Otago Highlanders, the Highlanders' franchise area encompassed the lower South Island of New Zealand (see Super 14 franchise areas), and was formed from the North Otago, Otago, and Southland provincial rugby unions.

The 1996 team was captained by John Leslie and coached by Gordon Hunter. Their first-ever Super 12 match was against the Queensland Reds at Carisbrook on 3 March 1996. Queensland were one of the competition favourites as they had won the 1994 and 1995 Super 10 championships (amateur predecessor of the Super 12) yet were defeated 57–17. They then defeated Transvaal 29–15 at Carisbrook before travelling to South Africa to defeat Western Province 52–25 in Cape Town. After three matches the Highlanders were undefeated and leading the competition. However, the following week at Loftus Versfeld Stadium they were defeated 59–29 by Northern Transvaal. They only won two more games that season; against Natal at Carisbrook, and against the Canterbury Crusaders at Lancaster Park. The win over the Crusaders was their only ever win in Christchurch. The Highlanders finished the season eighth on the table, and third out of the five New Zealand teams.

The 1997 was the least successful season ever for the Highlanders. They finished last, and managed only three wins. They spent their pre-season playing in Scotland and England where they won all seven matches. Carl Hoeft said of the pre-season; "Looking back now, it's safe to say it wasn't probably the best way we could have prepared. Even now, people think were crazy when I tell them what we did". They were now coached by Glenn Ross and captained by Taine Randell. Their eight defeats that season included a 75–43 defeat by Natal in Durban. The points scored by Natal included 50 points by Gavin Lawless—a competition record. Their three victories that season included defeating the Canterbury Crusaders at Carisbrook, and the Waikato Chiefs at Taupo—where Doug Howlett scored three tries for the Highlanders.

== Playoffs: 1998–2000 ==
Following their last place in the 1997 season, Tony Gilbert was appointed coach. Before the season began the Otago Highlanders were rated 100 to 1 odds of winning the competition in 1998. Their first game was against the Queensland Reds—who had finished in the top four in 1997—who they upset 26–19. Although they lost to the ACT Brumbies and then the Auckland Blues in rounds two and three, they then defeated 1997 finalists the Sharks in round four. They eventually became the first New Zealand side to defeat all four South African teams in one season (the Crusaders achieved the same feat one day later).

Their last two matches were in South Africa where they needed to get maximum competition points to qualify for the semii-finals. They defeated both the Stormers then the Bulls to get ten points from the two games. Winger Jeff Wilson scored five tries over the two games to help them achieve this. After defeating the Bulls at Loftus Versfeld they needed the Queensland Reds to not get a bonus point win, and not win by 14 points or more in order to stay in the top four. Queensland were defeated by the Brumbies 23–16 and the Highlanders finished fourth—qualifying for the semi-finals. They faced defending champions the Auckland Blues at Eden Park. The Blues were leading 20–16 at halftime, and were leading 30–26 before a controversial try to Adrian Cashmore pushed the Blues to a 37–26 lead. Joeli Vidiri had illegally taken out Highlander Stanley off the ball. Sharks' coach Ian McIntosh stated that: "Incorrect refereeing decisions cost both semi-finals" and that "The Highlanders conceded a try they shouldn't have".

The following season in 1999 the Highlanders superseded their 1997 season by hosting the tournament final. Otago had won the 1998 National Provincial Championship and the Highlanders carried that success on into the Super 12. They opened their season with a 19–13 victory over the Auckland Blues at Carisbrook. This was followed by a victory over the Northern Bulls in Invercargill, and then a 46–14 victory over the Stormers at Carisbrook. They then travelled to South Africa where they defeated the Cats before losing their first loss of the season to the Sharks in Durban. They returned to New Zealand to defeat the Waikato Chiefs and then the Crusaders. After defeating the Reds, the Highlanders lost to the New South Wales Waratahs at Carisbrook. The next week they defeated the Brumbies at the same venue.

Next they had their bye round, before facing the Wellington Hurricanes at Athletic Park. Despite leading 14–3 at half time, the Highlanders lost when Hurricanes' half-back Jason Spice scored in the corner to give the Hurricanes a 21–19 victory. Had the Highlanders won they would have finished top of the table and hosted a semi-final at Carisbrook. Instead they then had to travel from Wellington to South Africa to play the Stormers. After trailing 11–0, the Highlanders finished the first half ahead 22–18. They scored a further 11 points in the second half to win 33–18. The Highlanders travelled back to Dunedin and the match was moved to the Sunday to allow an extra for recovery. The 1999 Super 12 Final was against South Island rivals the Canterbury Crusaders, and was billed as "the party at Tony Brown's house" after Highlanders first five-eighth Tony Brown. The match in front of a sellout 41,500 person crowd the Highlanders scored first, and led 14–9 at half time. However, the decisive try was to Crusaders' wing Afato So'oalo when he chipped the ball, then out-sprinted All Blacks winger Jeff Wilson to collect the ball and score. Although the Highlanders' scored a try to Isitolo Maka with three minutes remaining the Crusaders won 24–19.

For the 2000 season Peter Sloane became coach after Tony Gilbert was appointed as the All Blacks' forwards coach. They opened their season with a 50–13 victory over Queensland Reds at Carisbrook; the second time the Reds had conceded 50 points to the Highlanders. They won their next three matches, against the Sharks, Hurricanes and Cats. However, the then lost their following three; against the Crusaders, Brumbies, and Blues. At the end of the regular season they had won six of their eleven games, and finished third due to a superior points difference to the fourth placed Cats. They played the Crusaders at Jade Stadium in their semi-final, and were defeated 37–15 after Marika Vunibaka scored two tries in the last 20 minutes.

== Mixed success: 2001–2005 ==
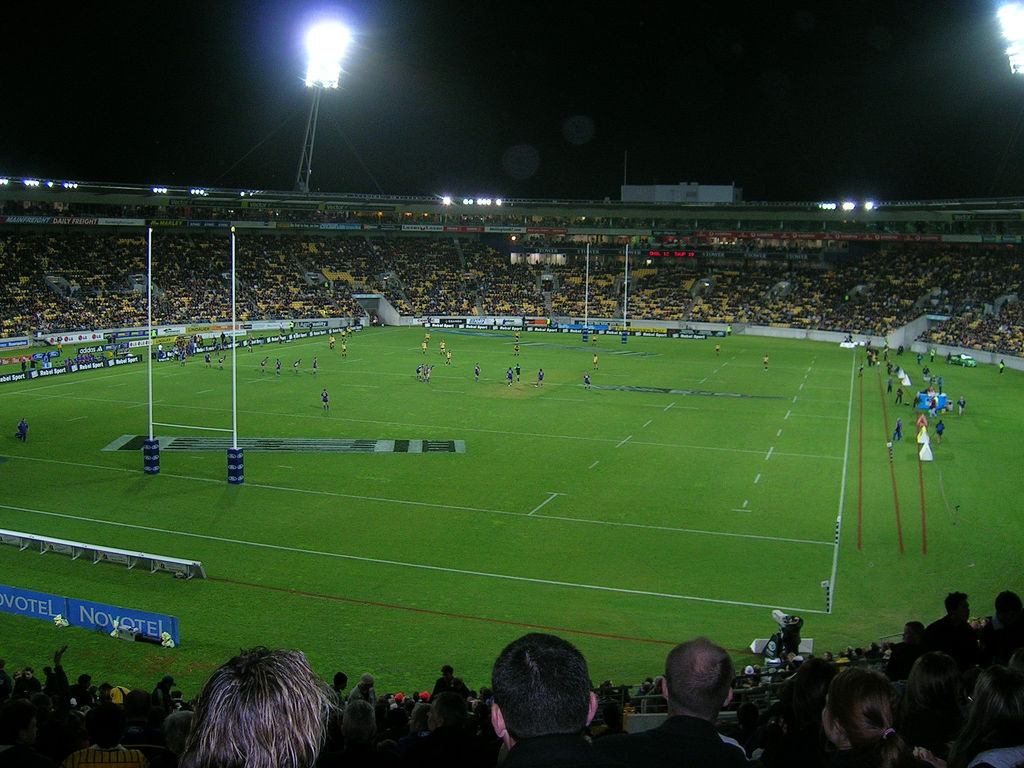
The Highlanders playing the Hurricanes at Wellington in 2005; their first win over them at that venue.

The Highlanders again opened their season with a victory at Carisbrook; this time a 23–8 victory over the Blues. After losing to the Cats in Johannesburg and the Sharks in Durban, they returned to Carisbrook with a one-point victory over the Stormers. Their 39–20 defeat of the Waratahs at Carisbrook on 7 April was the first defeat of New South Wales by an Otago-based side since the Otago provincial team defeated New South Wales 5–0 in 1901. They narrowly lost to the Hurricanes in Napier 35–33 before defeating the Brumbies at Carisbrook on 20 April. After a loss to Queensland they finished their season with a 26–21 defeat of the defending champion Crusaders at Carisbrook. Although the Highlanders went undefeated at home for a second consecutive season, the Highlanders finished fifth with six wins that season.

Laurie Mains had returned from South Africa to coach Otago in the 2001 NPC, and after Peter Sloane moved to the Blues, Mains was appointed the Highlanders coach for 2002. Their season started with a narrow 30–28 loss to the Crusaders at Jade Stadium, after leading 28–27 at one point. That year the Highlanders also achieved a win over all four South African teams; a Grand Slam that they had not achieved since 1998. The closest of those four victories was a 21–20 win over the Stormers in Cape Town. They also defeated the Brumbies 25–18 in Canberra, The Gordon Hunter Memorial Trophy was also introduced that season to be contested between the Highlanders and Blues. Gordon Hunter had coached both teams before dying from cancer in 2001. Highland prop said of the game against the Blues "While I’m sure Gordy was popular in Auckland during his time coaching up there, as he’d seemed to be everywhere he went, the trophy meant a huge amount to us and we were determined to be the first winners to honour his memory". The match was played at Eden Park, and the Highlanders were ahead 15–3 at half time, and eventually won 20–13. Their last home match of the season was against the Reds at Carisbrook. The Highlanders’ 40–26 win meant that they had gone three seasons undefeated at Carisbrook. With their eight victories from the regular season, the Highlanders finished fourth and played the Crusaders in Christchurch in their semi-final. The Crusaders won 34–23 although Jeff Wilson did score a try in his last match for the franchise.

The 2003 season started with a 29–16 win over the Chiefs in Hamilton. The win was notable because Highlander Willie Walker kicked eight penalties— which was a competition record. They then defeated the Stormers and Bulls before losing to coach Laurie Mains’ old team the Cats in Johannesburg. Winger Aisea Tuilevu was banned for foul play following the match, and Highlander's captain Tane Randell publicly criticised the South African judicial process. Their second loss of the season came when they played the Crusaders at Carisbrook. The Crusaders won 17–16 to record to first loss for the Highlanders at Carisbrook since the 1999 final—which was also lost to the Crusaders. The Highlanders had gone three seasons, 2000, 2001 and 2002, and 16 games unbeaten at Carisbrook. The Highlanders then defeated the Blues 22–11 to retain the Gordon Hunter Memorial Trophy, and inflict the only loss of the season on the Blues who would go on to win the 2003 Championship. Following the Highlander's 45–19 defeat of the Brumbies on 25 April it was revealed that a rift had developed between coach Laurie Mains and some of the senior players in the squad. Anton Oliver was branded the ringleader by Mains, but Carl Hoeft said of the conflict; "Anton got hung out as ringleader, but a lot of the players had issues with the way things were going and I was one of them—I’m not going to hide from that". The Highlanders lost to the Waratahs at Carisbrook on 3 May, but were in a position to qualify for the semi-finals if they defeated the Queensland Reds in the last round. The Reds won 28–23 and their season was over. The defeat was Mains’ last match as coach; he resigned as was replaced by his assistant Greg Cooper.

In contrast to their previous season, in 2004 the Highlanders conceded 44 tries, 12 more than in 2003, but scored nine more tries then in 2003. Not only did they have a new head coach, but also 13 new players in their squad, and a new captain after Anton Oliver took over the reins from Tane Randell. This all contributed to them finishing the season ninth, after winning four, and losing six of their eleven matches.

The Highlander's 2005 season started with only their second ever loss to the Blues at Carisbrook, a 30–14 loss. Following this the side won six games consecutively, the first time the franchise had ever done so. They first defeated the Bulls 23–0, then the Sharks 43–7. They then won away against the Cats and Reds. They returned to Carisbrook and defeated the Brumbies 19–18, and the following week won in Wellington for the first time with a 26–16 win over the Hurricanes. After a draw with the Stormers and a bye, the Highlanders had gone unbeaten for eight weeks. Thus three weeks from the end of the round robin they were third, but after losing their remaining three matches fell to eighth for the season.

== Expansion: 2006–2014 ==
After ten years the Super 12 was expanded to include two extra teams; the Western Force from Australia, and the Cheetahs from South Africa. The expanded competition was renamed the Super 14. The Highlanders continued under Cooper in 2006. Their first up match was a loss to the Crusaders in Christchurch, but they then won their next three games—including two in South Africa. They then lost two matches, to the Bulls and Sharks respectively, before defeating the Lions in Invercargill. They only won two of their last six games, and finished the season ranked ninth—the lowest ranked New Zealand team. The team lost several players to injury during the season, including James Ryan and Nick Evans.

The 2007 ended with a similar result to 2006. The Highlanders again finished ninth on the table, and worst of the New Zealand teams. They finished the season with five wins and eight losses from their thirteen matches. They started their season with a win over the Western Force, but then lost both their matches in South Africa to the Lions and Sharks. Of their next five matches they won three; against the Stormers, Reds and Cheetahs. They then won only one of their last five matches, against the Waratahs in Sydney. Following his fourth season in charge, and third with the Highlanders finishing ninth, coach Greg Cooper left the franchise to take up the assistant coaches position with the Blues. The coach for the 2008 season, Glenn Moore, was appointed 28 August 2007.

The Highlanders struggled in Moore's first season as coach. They won only three of their thirteen matches and finished eleventh on the table. Many of their losses were by seven points or less, including losses to the Reds, Brumbies, Waratahs and Hurricanes. The team did not win a match until the eighth round, when they defeated the Lions in Dunedin. Their second win of the season was over the Cheetahs Bloemfontein in round twelve. However, the team finished their season on a high — defeating the Crusaders in Christchurch. The Crusaders would go on to win the tournament that season. The 2009 season was similar to 2008, with the team winning four of their thirteen matches, and again losing many of their matches by seven points or less. After losing their first three matches, including to the Brumbies and Hurricanes by less than seven points, they defeated the Crusaders 6–0 in Dunedin for their first win of the season. The match produced the lowest aggregate score in Super Rugby history. After a narrow loss to the Chiefs, the Highlanders picked up their second win of the season over the Cheetahs. They then achieved their most dominant win of the season; a 36–12 victory over the Bulls. The Bull eventually won the tournament; the second year the Highlanders defeated the eventual champions. After a bye round, the Highlanders defeated the Reds for their third consecutive win. The team lost their remaining matches of the season — this included losses to the Stormers, Lions, and Western Force.

Another season with many more losses than wins occurred in 2010. The season started with a 32–17 loss to the Crusaders, followed by a narrow 15–19 loss to the Blues. The first season came next with a 31–24 win over the Cheetahs in South Africa. The South African trip ended with two losses though; a 33–0 defeat by the Stormers, and a high scoring loss to the Bulls. They eventually achieved their second win of the season over the Lions in round seven. Losses to the Chiefs and Western Force was followed by a narrow two-point loss to the Hurricanes. Next was their third win of the season; this time over the Waratahs in Invercargill. Their final two matches of the season were losses — 33–3 to the Brumbies, and a loss by two points to the Reds. Following the 2010 season, and after three seasons that resulted in only ten win in total, Moore was replaced by the Wellington provincial coach Jamie Joseph — a former Otago representative from the 1990s.

The appointment of Joseph as coach coincided with the expansion of the competition from 14 teams to 15 teams. The expanded competition was renamed Super Rugby, and converted to a conference system with three conferences of five teams — Australia, New Zealand, and South Africa. The Highlanders now had to play each other New Zealand team twice, and four teams each from the Australian and South African conferences — 16 matches in total over the regular season. Joseph's rein as coach started with a win over the Hurricanes in Wellington, followed by a win over the Chiefs in Dunedin, and a win over the Bulls in Pretoria. The team then suffered their first loss of the season to the Stormers in Cape Town, followed by a loss to the Crusaders in Dunedin. The Highlanders then won their next four matches; their last a 26–18 victory over the Crusaders in Nelson. The Highlanders then lost all but one of their remaining matches of the season to finish with eight wins and eight losses in total. This left them eighth out of fifteen teams on the table, and third in the New Zealand conference.

The 2012 was one of two contrasting halves for the Highlanders. The team won their first four matches — against the Chiefs, Crusaders, Waratahs, and Hurricanes. By that point the Highlanders were on the top of the table, but lost the position after losing to the Brumbies in Canberra. After a win over the Rebels, loss to the Stormers, and a bye, the Highlanders defeated the Blues 30–27 in Dunedin. They narrowly defeated the Cheetahs in Bloemfontein in round 10; they then stood fifth in the table. The team went on to lose five of their seven remaining matches, and slip to ninth on the table after the end of the regular season. Despite winning more matches than in 2011, the Highlanders finished fourth in the New Zealand conference — with only the Blues below them.

== Victory 2015-present ==
Highlanders won the 2015 Super Rugby season, with Phil Gifford calling their win "the greatest Super Rugby comeback this century." Thousands of fans participated in a Highlanders victory parade in Dunedin.

== Bibliography ==
- Gifford, Phil (2004). The Passion - The Stories Behind 125 years of Canterbury Rugby. Wilson Scott Publishing. ISBN 0-9582535-1-X.
- Howitt, Bob (2005). SANZAR Saga - Ten Years of Super 12 and Tri-Nations Rugby. Harper Collins Publishers. ISBN 1-86950-566-2.
- McIlraith, Matt (2005). Ten Years of Super 12. Hodder Moa. ISBN 1-86971-025-8.
