= Tinus Linee =

South African rugby union player

- Born: Marthinus Linee; 23 August 1969 Paarl, Cape Province (now Western Cape), South Africa
- Died: 3 November 2014 (aged 45) Paarl, Western Cape, South Africa
- Height: 1.80 m (5 ft 11 in)
- Weight: 92 kg (14 st 7 lb)
- School: Paulus Joubert Senior Secondary School

Rugby union career
- Position: Centre
Senior career
| Years | Team | Apps | (Points) |
- SA Defense (Cape Town) RFC
Provincial / State sides
| Years | Team | Apps | (Points) |
| 1992–2001 | Western Province | 112 | (140) |
Super Rugby
| Years | Team | Apps | (Points) |
| 1996 | Western Province | | |
| 1999 | Stormers | 1 | (0) |
International career
| Years | Team | Apps | (Points) |
| 1993–1994 | South Africa (tour) | 9 | (0) |
| 1994–1996 | South Africa 'A' | 5 | (10) |
Coaching career
- Years: Team
- 2012: RCM Universitatea Timişoara (assistant coach)

Marthinus "Tinus" Linee (23 August 1969 – 3 November 2014) was a South African rugby union player. Linee played predominantly at centre. He played all his provincial rugby for Western Province. He represented Western Province and the Stormers in Super Rugby. He played nine tour games for the Springboks between 1993 and 1994, but never played in a test for South Africa.

== Youth ==
Linee attended Nederburg Primary School along with his future wife, Diana. Both former Springbok player Chester Williams and former Springbok coach Peter de Villiers attended Nederburg Primary.

== Playing career ==
=== Provincial ===
Linee made his debut for Western Province in 1992 and played 112 games for the province until his retirement in 2001. Renowned as a hard-hitting centre, he was a regular starter in the midfield for Western Province. In 2001, future Springbok captain Jean de Villiers made his Western Province debut alongside Tinus Linee.

On 14 October 1995 Linee played in his first Currie Cup final, against the Sharks at Kings Park Stadium in Durban. Linee played alongside Springbok and Western Province legends such as Pieter Rossouw, Chester Williams, Justin Swart, Joel Stransky and Tiaan Strauss as well as French legend Laurent Cabannes. The Sharks won the game 25–17. Linee was also part of the Western Province squad when they won Currie Cup titles in 1997, 2000 and 2001.

=== Super Rugby ===
In 1996 Tinus Linee was part of the Western Province team that competed in the Super 12. Western Province failed to qualify for the 1997 Super 12 season and Linee was not part of the squad when the Stormers played in the 1998 Super 12 season. In 1999, he returned to the Cape Town based Super Rugby team's squad, but failed to make the Stormers' Super Rugby squads in 2000 and 2001.

=== South Africa ===
In 1993 Linee was picked for the Springboks on their tour to Australia. He made his debut for the Springboks in a tour match against the Victoria national rugby union team in Melbourne on 21 July 1993. At the time, Heinrich Füls and Pieter Muller were the preferred centres for the test matches, so Linee played only in tour games and failed to make the team for the test matches.

In 1994 Linee again made the Springbok squad for both the Argentinean tour to South Africa as well as the Springbok tour to Wales, Scotland and Ireland. He again did not feature in any of the test matches and on 22 November 1994, he played his last tour match for the Springboks against Pontypridd in Pontypridd, Wales.

== Coaching career ==
In 2008 Linee formed part of Western Province's Vodacom Cup team management. In 2012 he was assistant coach at RCM Universitatea Timişoara in Romania alongside head coach and former Springbok teammate, Chester Williams. While being the assistant coach in 2012, RCM Universitatea Timişoara won the SuperLiga CEC Bank, Romania's main domestic rugby competition.

== Honours ==
=== Playing career ===
Western Province

- Currie Cup: 1997, 2000, 2001

=== Coaching career ===
RCM Universitatea Timişoara

- SuperLiga CEC Bank: 2012

== Health and death ==
In April 2013, Linee was diagnosed with motor neurone disease.

His deteriorating health resulted in him having financial difficulties in an attempt to cover his medical costs. This resulted in him auctioning off his Springbok and Western Province blazers to raise money. South African fans organised and contributed to several fundraisers to assist him and his family financially. The introduction of a ventilator in April 2014, meant that his condition remained stable without deteriorating. His hands, however, remained virtually paralysed. Linee died on 3 November 2014, aged 45 in his family home in Paarl.

He was survived by his wife Diana, her two sons, and a daughter from his first marriage.

== See also ==
- List of South Africa national rugby union players – Springbok no. 591
