= Jason Chandler =

Jason Chandler may refer to:

- Jason Chandler (singer)
- Jason Chandler (rugby union)
