= Cameron Rackham =

New Zealand rugby union player

- Full name: Cameron Jarvis Rackham
- Born: 29 April 1975 (age 51)
- School: Auckland Grammar School

Rugby union career
- Position: Five-eighth / Fullback
Provincial / State sides
Years	Team	Apps	(Points)
1994–95	Auckland	7	(65)
Super Rugby
Years	Team	Apps	(Points)
1996	Blues	3	(0)

Cameron Jarvis Rackham (born 29 April 1975) is a New Zealand former professional rugby union player.

Rackham was educated at Auckland Grammar School and represented New Zealand at under-21s level.

A five-eighth and fullback, Rackham was a foundation player for the Auckland Blues in the 1996 Super 12 season and after making the occasional appearance off the bench was an unused substitute in their grand final win over Natal. Following his time in Auckland, Rackham had a stint at Italian club Benetton Rugby Treviso, then played in Japan with Suntory.
