= Chris Hawkins (rugby union) =

- Born: Christopher William Hawkins; 1945
- Died: 1 October 2020 (aged 74–75)

Rugby union career
Coaching career
- Years: Team
- 1980s: New South Wales Schoolboys
- 1987–1990: Australian Schoolboys
- 1991–1995: Gordon
- 1996: New South Wales Waratahs
- 1990s: Gordon

Christopher William Hawkins (1945 – 1 October 2020) was an Australian former rugby union player and coach. Hawkins was the first coach of the New South Wales Waratahs during the professional era of rugby union, and coached their first season in the Super Rugby in 1996. Hawkins also coached Gordon in the Shute Shield, the Australian Schoolboys, and the Sydney Church of England Grammar School, known commonly as Shore.

== Career ==
Hawkins was appointed Gordon coach in late 1990 ahead of the 1991 Shute Shield season, taking over from Alec Evans. Before his appointment, Hawkins, whom had never coached at grade level before, was praised for his prior experience with the Australian Schoolboys team, which was labelled "outstanding" by The Sydney Morning Herald. While at Gordon, Hawkins won two premierships (1993, 1995), the first in seventeen years.

In October 1995, Hawkins was announced as the New South Wales Waratahs head coach on a two-year deal. This meant that Hawkins would be the head coach of the Waratahs in their inaugural Super Rugby season. Hawkins took over from Greg Smith who was appointed Australia national team (Wallabies) coach. The month prior, Hawkins had declared his intention to coach the Wallabies, after announcing his interest. He was one of four candidates, alongside incumbent coach Bob Dwyer, Queensland coach John Connolly, and the aforementioned Smith.

The Waratahs finished 7th of 12 in the inaugural Super Rugby season, which included five wins, six losses. At the end of the season Hawkins had agreed to stand down as coach of the team following a meeting with the New South Wales Rugby Union (NSWRU). Overall, Hawkins finished with a below 50% win ratio out of 22 games coached.

On 1 October 2020, Hawkins died after a long battle with cancer.
