= Kupu Vanisi =

- Born: Osaiasi Kupu Vanisi; 30 November 1972 (age 53) Nuku'alofa, Tonga
- Height: 1.86 m (6 ft 1 in)
- Weight: 97 kg (15 st 4 lb)
- School: King's High School

Rugby union career
- Position: Flanker
Provincial / State sides
Years	Team	Apps	(Points)
1994-1998	Otago	36	(20)
1999-2003	Wellington	45	(10)
Super Rugby
Years	Team	Apps	(Points)
1996-1998	Highlanders	23	(20)
1999-2003	Hurricanes	43	(5)
International career
Years	Team	Apps	(Points)
1999	New Zealand	1	

Osaiasi Kupu Vanisi (born 30 November 1972) is a former professional rugby union footballer who played at flanker for the Highlanders and Hurricanes in the Super Rugby competition. He also made a single appearance for the All Blacks in 1999.

ALL BLACK DEBUT	Friday, 11 June 1999 v New Zealand 'A' at Christchurch aged 26 years, 193 days

(Vanisi's stats by seasons)

Team	Season	Apps	T	C	P	DG	Pts
Provincial							
Otago	1994	3	-	-	-	-	-
Otago	1995	6	1	-	-	-	5
Otago	1996	15	1	-	-	-	5
Otago	1997	2	1	-	-	-	5
Otago	1998	6	1	-	-	-	5
Wellington	1999	13	-	-	-	-	-
Wellington	2000	11	-	-	-	-	-
Wellington	2001	9	-	-	-	-	-
Wellington	2002	10	2	-	-	-	10
Wellington	2003	2	-	-	-	-	-
-		77	6	-	-	-	30
Super Rugby							
Highlanders	1996	9	3	-	-	-	15
Highlanders	1997	10	1	-	-	-	5
Highlanders	1998	4	-	-	-	-	-
Hurricanes	1999	11	-	-	-	-	-
Hurricanes	2000	11	-	-	-	-	-
Hurricanes	2001	1	-	-	-	-	-
Hurricanes	2002	10	1	-	-	-	5
Hurricanes	2003	10	-	-	-	-	-
-		66	5	-	-	-	25
Representative							
All Blacks	1999	1	-	-	-	-	-
-		1	-	-	-		

== Playing career ==
Vanisi was born in Nuku'alofa, Tonga and his father Vainikolo played for the Tongan nation team in the 1960s, but the family moved to Dunedin, New Zealand in his youth. He made his provincial debut for Otago in 1994 and was a member of the original Highlanders squad in 1996, but the presence of Josh Kronfeld - one of the dominant openside flankers in world rugby in the 1990s - severely curtailed his opportunities for both sides.

In 1999, Vanisi shifted to Wellington and the Hurricanes, where he would flourish with increased playing time. A strong debut season with the Hurricanes saw him called up to the All Blacks in 1999, where he made a single appearance in a non-test game against New Zealand A.

While he wouldn't again feature for New Zealand internationally, Vanisi continued as a regular squad member for both Wellington and the Hurricanes through 2003, serving as a veteran mentor to rising stars like Jerry Collins and Rodney So'oialo.

He finished off his legendary career with a three-year stint in Japan before retiring.
