= André Joubert =

South African rugby union player

- Born: André Johan Joubert; 15 April 1964 (age 62) Ladysmith, South Africa
- Height: 1.87 m (6 ft 2 in)
- Weight: 92 kg (14 st 7 lb)
- School: Ladysmith High School
- University: University of the Free State

Rugby union career
- Position: Fullback centre
Provincial / State sides
Years	Team	Apps	(Points)
1986–1991	Free State	33	(292)
1992–1999	Sharks (Currie Cup)	95	(873)
Super Rugby
Years	Team	Apps	(Points)
1996–1999	Sharks	35	(224)
International career
Years	Team	Apps	(Points)
1989–1997	South Africa	34	(115)
National sevens team
Years	Team		Comps
1992–1994	South Africa		

André Johan Joubert (born 15 April 1964 in Ladysmith) is a former South African rugby union player, widely known as "The Rolls-Royce of Fullbacks" for his pace, class, and seemingly effortless style. He was capped 34 times at fullback for the Springboks in the 1990s, and amassed 115 test points from 10 tries, 17 penalties and 7 conversions.

== 1995 Rugby World Cup ==
Joubert played a major role in the Springboks' success at the 1995 Rugby World Cup held in South Africa, most notably turning in an outstanding performance in the 15–12 win over the All Blacks in the final, despite playing with a broken hand. The quarterfinal almost proved to be the end of Joubert's World Cup when his hand was broken in contact with Western Samoa player George Harder. That same night he went for surgery and spent time in a decompression chamber.

== Domestic career ==
While a student at the University of the Free State, Joubert made his debut for the Free State in 1986. In 1992 he moved to Natal and continued to represent the union, that later was renamed the Sharks, until 1999.

Joubert was first choice fullback for the Sharks during the inaugural Super 12 competition in 1996, helping them reach the final against the Auckland Blues. Also, in 1996, he was man of the match against the then Transvaal, in the Currie Cup final as he scored two tries. Joubert won three Currie Cups: '92, '95 & '96.

He played his last competitive rugby match in the 1999 Currie Cup final for the Sharks against the Gauteng Lions, a match which also saw the final appearances of Gary Teichmann and Ian McIntosh as captain and coach respectively. It was a sad farewell for three of Natal's favourite sons as the Lions lifted the cup with a convincing 32–9 victory.

== International career ==
He made his international debut, aged 25, in 1989 against a World XV in a game the Springboks won 20–19. His final international appearance came in 1997, playing a major role by assisting Percy Montgomery and others in scoring tries and demolishing Australia 61–22, the Wallabies in Pretoria.

=== Test history ===
World Cup final

No.	Opponents	Results (SA 1st)	Position	Points	Dates	Venue
1.	World XV	20–19	Replacement		26 Aug 1989	Newlands, Cape Town
2.	Australia	12–19	Fullback		21 Aug 1993	Sydney Football Stadium, Sydney
3.	Argentina	29–26	Fullback	5 (1 try)	6 Nov 1993	Ferro Carril Oeste Stadium, Buenos Aires
4.	England	15–32	Fullback	15 (5 pen.)	4 Jun 1994	Loftus Versfeld, Pretoria
5.	England	27–9	Fullback	13 (1 try, 1 con, 2 pen)	11 Jun 1994	Newlands, Cape Town
6.	New Zealand	14–22	Fullback	9 (3 pen)	9 July 1994	Carisbrook, Dunedin
7.	New Zealand	9–13	Replacement		23 Jul 1994	Athletic Park, Wellington
8.	New Zealand	18–18	Fullback		6 Aug 1994	Eden Park, Auckland
9.	Argentina	46–26	Fullback		15 Oct 1994	Ellis Park, Johannesburg
10.	Scotland	34–10	Fullback	9 (3 con, 1 pen)	19 Nov 1994	Murrayfield, Edinburgh
11.	Wales	20–12	Fullback	5 (1 try)	26 Nov 1994	Cardiff Arms Park, Cardiff
12.	Australia	27–18	Fullback		25 May 1995	Newlands, Cape Town
13.	Canada	20–0	Fullback		3 Jun 1995	Boet Erasmus Stadium, Port Elizabeth
14.	Samoa	42–14	Fullback		10 Jun 1995	Ellis Park, Johannesburg
15.	France	19–15	Fullback		17 Jun 1995	Kings Park, Durban
16.	New Zealand	15–12	Fullback		24 Jun 1995	Ellis Park, Johannesburg
17.	Wales	40–11	Fullback		2 Sep 1995	Ellis Park, Johannesburg
18.	Italy	40–21	Fullback		12 Nov 1995	Stadio Olimpico, Rome
19.	England	24–14	Fullback		18 Nov 1995	Twickenham, London
20.	Fiji	43–18	Fullback	13 (1 try, 1 con, 2 pen)	2 Jul 1996	Loftus Versfeld, Pretoria
21.	Australia	16–21	Fullback	3 (1 pen)	13 Jul 1996	Sydney Football Stadium, Sydney
22.	New Zealand	11–15	Fullback	5 (1 try)	20 Jul 1996	AMI Stadium, Christchurch
23.	New Zealand	19–23	Fullback		17 Aug 1996	Kings Park, Durban
24.	New Zealand	26–33	Fullback		24 Aug 1996	Loftus Versfeld, Pretoria
25.	New Zealand	32–22	Fullback	14 (1 try, 3 pen)	31 Aug 1996	Ellis Park, Johannesburg
26.	Argentina	46–15	Fullback	7 (1 try, 1 con)	9 Nov 1996	Ferro Carril Oeste, Buenos Aires
27.	Argentina	44–21	Fullback		16 Nov 1996	Ferro Carril Oeste, Buenos Aires
28.	France	22–12	Fullback	5 (1 try)	30 Nov 1996	Stade Chaban-Delmas, Bordeaux
29.	France	13–12	Fullback		7 Dec 1996	Parc des Princes, Paris
30.	Wales	37–20	Fullback	7 (1 try, 1 con)	15 Dec 1996	Cardiff Arms Park, Cardiff
31.	Tonga	74–10	Fullback		10 Jun 1997	Newlands, Cape Town
32.	British Lions	16–25	Fullback		21 Jun 1997	Newlands, Cape Town
33.	(British & Irish Lions) British Lions	15–18	Fullback	5 (1 try)	28 Jun 1997	Kings Park, Durban
34.	Australia	61–22	Fullback		23 Aug 1997	Loftus Versfeld, Pretoria

Legend: pen = penalty (3 pts.); con = conversion (2 pts.), drop = drop kick (3 pts.).

== Other accomplishments ==
He was twice (1991 and 1994) shortlisted for the South African "Player of the Year" award, eventually winning in 1996. In 1988, he was one of the five SA Young Players of the Year, along with Kobus Burger, Jacques du Plessis, Christian Stewart and JJ van der Walt.

Apart from playing for the Springboks and Sharks he has also played for the following teams:

  - South African Barbarians (1992)
  - British Barbarians (1992)
  - French Barbarians
  - World XV (1992)
  - South African Sevens 1992–1994

== See also ==
- List of South Africa national rugby union players – Springbok no. 557
