= Sean Cuttance =

- Full name: Sean Joseph Cuttance
- Born: 30 March 1972 (age 54)

Rugby union career
- Position: Hooker
Provincial / State sides
Years	Team	Apps	(Points)
1994	Otago	2	(0)
1996	South Canterbury	7	(5)
1998–00	Canterbury	13	(0)
Super Rugby
Years	Team	Apps	(Points)
1999	Crusaders	1	(0)
Coaching career
- Years: Team
- 2015–19: West Coast
- 2023–: West Coast

Sean Joseph Cuttance (born 30 March 1972) is a New Zealand former professional rugby union player.

A hooker, Cuttance played provincial rugby with Otago, South Canterbury and Canterbury. He made a solitary Super 12 appearance for the Crusaders, coming on off the bench in their 1999 season opener against the Chiefs at Jade Stadium, which they won 48–3.

Cuttance was appointed co-coach of West Coast alongside Allan Lindsay in 2013, then served as head coach from 2015 to 2019, before returning in 2023 to lead the province to the Lochore Cup title.
