= Andrew Blowers =

Rugby union player

- Born: Andrew Francis Blowers; 27 March 1975 (age 51) Auckland, New Zealand
- Height: 6 ft 4 in (1.93 m)
- Weight: 16 st 7 lb (105 kg)
- School: Mount Albert Grammar School

Rugby union career
- Position(s): Flanker, No. 8
Senior career
Years	Team	Apps	(Points)
1996–1998	Blues	34	(70)
1999	Hurricanes	11	(0)
2001–2005	Northampton Saints	88	(30)
2007–2009	Bristol	26	(10)
Provincial / State sides
Years	Team	Apps	(Points)
	Auckland	45	
International career
Years	Team	Apps	(Points)
1996–1999	New Zealand	11	(0)
Coaching career
- Years: Team
- 2021–: Melbourne Rebels (leadership and wellbeing)
- Correct as of 12 December 2023

Andrew Francis Blowers (born 27 March 1975) is a former rugby union player who played in the back row as either a flanker or number 8. He earned 11 caps for the New Zealand national team between 1996 and 1999. He retired from playing in 2009.

After working for Australian rugby league side Melbourne Storm as Player Wellbeing Manager, Blowers returned to rugby union as the Leadership and Well-Being coach for Super Rugby side Melbourne Rebels in October 2021.

== International career ==
Blowers was born in Auckland, New Zealand. As a result of his Samoan heritage, he started his international career for the Samoa national rugby union team. Blowers scored on his All Blacks debut on 6 August 1996, versus Boland Invitation XV at Worcester. Four days later he received his first international cap versus South Africa at Cape Town.

After 18 All Black matches he played his final game against Italy on Thursday, 14 October 1999. Of his 11 competitive tests the All Blacks won 10, their only loss coming at the hands of Australia.
