= Jason Chandler (rugby union) =

- Full name: Jason William Chandler
- Born: 23 September 1970 (age 56) Wellington, New Zealand
- Height: 6 ft 6 in (198 cm)
- Weight: 238 lb (108 kg)

Rugby union career
- Position: Lock
Provincial / State sides
Years	Team	Apps	(Points)
1992–93	Manawatu	9	(5)
1993–99	Auckland	35	(25)
2000–01	Bay of Plenty	14	(0)
Super Rugby
Years	Team	Apps	(Points)
1996	Blues	4	(0)

Jason William Chandler (born 23 September 1970) is a New Zealand former professional rugby union player.

== Rugby career ==
Chandler got his start in provincial rugby as a lock with Manawatu, before moving on to Auckland in 1993. He was sent off in Auckland's 1993 NPC final win over Otago for punching Josh Kronfeld, breaking the flanker's cheekbone. At the end of the season, Chandler was part of Auckland's development tour of the United Kingdom. He made four appearances for the Auckland Blues in the 1996 Super 12 season, including the grand final win over the Sharks. Between 1996 and 1999, Chandler played professional rugby in England with the Northampton Saints. He won an NPC second division title with the Bay of Plenty in 2000.

== Personal life ==
Chandlers runs a food production company in Auckland.
