= Peter Nixon (rugby union) =

Rugby player (born 1984)

- Full name: Peter William Nixon
- Born: 5 July 1984 (age 42) Nelson, New Zealand
- Height: 190 cm (6 ft 3 in)
- Weight: 108 kg (238 lb)
- School: Christ's College

Rugby union career
- Position: No. 8
Provincial / State sides
Years	Team	Apps	(Points)
2005–06	Canterbury	3	(5)
2007	Tasman	7	(0)
Super Rugby
Years	Team	Apps	(Points)
2007	Crusaders	3	(0)

Peter William Nixon (born 5 July 1984) is a New Zealand former professional rugby union player.

Born in Nelson, Nixon attended Christ's College and was a New Zealand under-21s representative loose forward.

Nixon started his provincial career at Canterbury but found it hard to force his way into the line up and in 2007 was loaned out to Tasman, who were looking to replace the departed George Naoupu. He made three appearances off the bench for the Crusaders during the 2007 Super 14 season.
