= Cabous van der Westhuizen =

South African rugby union footballer

- Born: Jacobus Ferdinand van der Westhuizen; 16 December 1965 (age 60) Cape Town, Western Cape, South Africa
- Height: 1.86 m (6 ft 1 in)
- Weight: 85 kg (187 lb)
- School: Hoërskool Jan van Riebeeck
- University: Stellenbosch University; Rand Afrikaans University

Rugby union career
- Position: Wing
Provincial / State sides
Years	Team	Apps	(Points)
1989–1990	Transvaal	22	
1991	Western Province	2	
1991	Western Province League		
1992–1998	Natal	128	(450)
International career
Years	Team	Apps	(Points)
1994	South Africa		

Jacobus Ferdinand "Cabous" van der Westhuizen (born 16 December 1965) is a South African former rugby union player. He never played in a test match, but played for South Africa in 11 tour matches.

== Rugby career ==
After finishing school, Van der Westhuizen enrolled at Stellenbosch University for a degree in physical education and played for the Maties rugby team. On completion of his degree he moved to Johannesburg and made his provincial debut for Transvaal during 1989 and in 1991 he returned to the Western Cape and was selected for Western Province. He however injured his knee ligaments and after his rehabilitation, while playing for Western Province League against Natal, was spotted by the Natal coach, Ian McIntosh, who persuaded him to move to Natal, where he spent seven seasons.

With his retirement from rugby, Van der Westhuizen held the Natal record for most tries in a career, namely 90 in 128 games, as well as most tries in a season, with 28 during the 1993 season.

Van der Westhuizen toured with the Springboks to New Zealand in 1994 and at the end of 1994 to Britain and Ireland, playing in 11 tour matches and scoring two tries for South Africa.

== See also ==
- List of South Africa national rugby union players – Springbok no. 609
