= Sam Johnstone (rugby union) =

New Zealand rugby union player (born 1976)

- Full name: Samuel Richard Johnstone
- Born: 14 December 1976 (age 49)

Rugby union career
- Position: Prop
Provincial / State sides
Years	Team	Apps	(Points)
1999–00	Marlborough	22	(0)
2001	Wellington	5	(0)
2005	Nelson Bays	11	(0)
2006	Tasman	5	(5)
Super Rugby
Years	Team	Apps	(Points)
1998	Crusaders	1	(0)

Samuel Richard Johnstone (born 14 December 1976) is a New Zealand former professional rugby union player.

Hailing from Timaru, Johnstone attended both Otago Boys' High School and Timaru Boys' High School. He was a New Zealand Schools representative player in 1995.

Johnstone, a prop, had stints with provincial sides Marlborough, Wellington, Nelson Bays and Tasman, in a career which spanned from 1999 to 2006. He also featured once for the Crusaders, against the Chiefs at North Harbour Stadium, during the Canterbury team's title-winning 1998 Super 12 campaign.
