= Jeremy Thomson =

South Africa international rugby union player

- Born: Jeremy Roy David Thomson; 24 June 1967 (age 59) Pietermaritzburg, KwaZulu-Natal
- Height: 1.78 m (5 ft 10 in)
- Weight: 78 kg (172 lb)
- School: Maritzburg College

Rugby union career
Senior career
Years	Team	Apps	(Points)
1998–2000	Saracens F.C.	26	(10)
Provincial / State sides
Years	Team	Apps	(Points)
1989–91, 93–98	Natal	152	(161)
1992	Golden Lions	16	(25)
Super Rugby
Years	Team	Apps	(Points)
1998	Coastal Sharks	12	(5)
International career
Years	Team	Apps	(Points)
1996	South Africa		

Jeremy Roy David Thomson (born 24 June 1967) is a South African former rugby union player.

== Playing career ==
Thomson represented Natal at the Craven Week tournament for schoolboys and was selected for the South African Schools team in 1986. He made his provincial debut for Natal in 1989 and in 1992 he joined Transvaal. He returned to Natal and continued to play 152 matches for the union. From 1998 to 2000, Thomson played for Saracens in London, England.

At the end of the 1996 season, he toured with the Springboks to Argentina and Europe. Thomson did not play in any test matches but played in four tour matches, scoring one try for the Springboks.

== See also ==
- List of South Africa national rugby union players – Springbok no. 648
- List of South Africa national under-18 rugby union team players
