= Damon Kaui =

New Zealand rugby union player (born 1971)

- Full name: Damon Apanui Kaui
- Born: 23 October 1971 (age 55)

Rugby union career
- Position: Fullback / Wing
Provincial / State sides
Years	Team	Apps	(Points)
1990–98	Bay of Plenty	99	(188)
1999	Hawke's Bay	1	(0)
2003–04	Bay of Plenty	14	(10)
Super Rugby
Years	Team	Apps	(Points)
1996	Crusaders	6	(15)
1997	Chiefs	2	(0)

Damon Apanui Kaui (born 23 October 1971) is a New Zealand former professional rugby union player.

A fullback and winger, Kaui represented the New Zealand Development team and New Zealand Colts early in his career, then later earned trials with New Zealand Maori.

Kaui was an experienced player with Bay of Plenty by the time he got picked to play fullback for the Crusaders in the 1996 Super 12 season and scored two tries on his competition debut against the Bulls at Lancaster Park. The following year, Kaui linked up with the Chiefs, where he was used off the bench.

Due to disciplinary reasons, Kaui was dropped by the Bay of Plenty after 1998 and competed briefly with Hawke's Bay, before gaining a recall to the Steamers side in 2003, allowing him to bring up his 100th appearance.
