= Vlok Cilliers =

South African rugby union player

- Born: Nicolaas Vlok Cilliers; 26 March 1968 (age 58) Williston, Northern Cape, South Africa
- Height: 1.72 m (5 ft 8 in)
- Weight: 82 kg (181 lb)
- School: Carnarvon High School

Rugby union career
- Position: Fly-half
Provincial / State sides
Years	Team	Apps	(Points)
1989–1991	South Western Districts	25	
1992–1998	Western Province	76	(746)
1999	Free State Cheetahs	4	(26)
International career
Years	Team	Apps	(Points)
1996	South Africa	1	
National sevens team
Years	Team		Comps
1993–1998	South Africa 7s		4
Coaching career
- Years: Team
- 2019–2026: France (kicking coach)
- 2026–: Bulls (kicking coach)
- Correct as of 9 October 2026

Nicolaas Vlok Cilliers (born 26 March 1968) is a South African former rugby union player who played as a fly-half. After his playing years, he became a kicking coach.

== Playing career ==
Cilliers represented North Western Cape at the 1987 Craven Week tournament for schoolboys and in 1988, while receiving his police training, he played for Northern Transvaal's under–20 team. He made his provincial debut for South Western Districts in 1989, after which he moved to Western Province, for which he played 76 games and scored 746 points. He finished his playing career with the Free State Cheetahs.

Cilliers made his test debut for the Springboks in 1996 during the second test against New Zealand at Kings Park in Durban.

== See also ==
- List of South Africa national rugby union players – Springbok no. 637
- List of South Africa national rugby sevens players
