= Angus Gardiner =

English-born New Zealand rugby union player (born 1971)

- Full name: Jonathan Angus Gardiner
- Born: 6 October 1971 (age 55) Stoke-on-Trent, England
- Height: 6 ft 1 in (185 cm)
- Weight: 220 lb (100 kg)

Rugby union career
- Position: Flanker
Senior career
Years	Team	Apps	(Points)
1999–01	Bath		
2001–03	AS Beziers		
Provincial / State sides
Years	Team	Apps	(Points)
1993–99	Canterbury	69	(110)
Super Rugby
Years	Team	Apps	(Points)
1996–99	Crusaders	38	(15)

Jonathan Angus Gardiner (born 6 October 1971) is an English-born New Zealand former professional rugby union player.

== Biography ==
Gardiner was born to New Zealand parents in Stoke-on-Trent and grew up in Christchurch, attending Christchurch Boys High School. He represented New Zealand at Under-19s level.

An openside flanker, Gardiner won Super 12 titles with the Crusaders in 1998 and 1999. He left for Bath in 1999 and gained England "A" honours within three months of arriving. After contesting the 2000–01 Premiership Rugby final with Bath, Gardiner finished his career with a stint at French club AS Beziers.

Gardiner's son Dominic plays for the Crusaders.
