= Paul Mitchell (rugby union) =

New Zealand rugby union player (born 1967)

- Full name: Paul Leigh Mitchell
- Born: 1 March 1967 (age 59) Hāwera, New Zealand
- Notable relative(s): John Mitchell (brother); Daryl Mitchell (nephew); Colin Meads (father-in-law)

Rugby union career
- Position: Hooker
Provincial / State sides
Years	Team	Apps	(Points)
1988–97	King Country	128	(121)
1999	Auckland	12	(0)
2000–01	King Country	18	(15)
Super Rugby
Years	Team	Apps	(Points)
1996–97	Chiefs	13	(15)
1998–99	Blues	17	(15)
2000–01	Chiefs	20	(5)

Paul Leigh Mitchell (born 1 March 1967) is a New Zealand former professional rugby union player.

Born in Hāwera, Taranaki, Mitchell is the younger brother of ex-All Blacks coach John Mitchell, with whom he attended Francis Douglas Memorial College and was involved in basketball, a sport their parents had played.

Mitchell, nicknamed "Ox", was a hooker and began at Waitete as a 16-year-old in 1983. He competed in the Super 12 from 1996 to 2001, with the Chiefs and Blues. In 2002, Mitchell represented the NZ Divisional XV against the touring Ireland national team. He captained King Country and retired the province's most capped player, with 146 appearances.

A former King Country head coach, Mitchell is the groundsman at Rugby Park in Te Kūiti.

Mitchell is married to former NZ basketball player Shelley Meads, who is the daughter of All Black Colin Meads.
