= Andrew Miller (rugby union) =

Japan international rugby union player

- Born: Andrew John Miller Son (Max Miller); 13 September 1972 (age 54) Te Puke, New Zealand
- Height: 1.82 m (6 ft 0 in)
- Weight: 82 kg (12 st 13 lb)

Rugby union career
- Position(s): Fly-half, Full back
Amateur team(s)
Years	Team	Apps	(Points)
1991-1995	United Pirates		
1996	Te Puke Sports		
1997	Te Puke		
Senior career
Years	Team	Apps	(Points)
1998-2004	Kobelco Steelers		
Provincial / State sides
Years	Team	Apps	(Points)
1991-1997	Bay of Plenty	69	(718)
2004	Southland	1	(0)
Super Rugby
Years	Team	Apps	(Points)
1996	Crusaders	7	(77)
International career
Years	Team	Apps	(Points)
1992	New Zealand Colts	2	(21)
2002-2003	Japan	10	(70)

Andrew (Andy) Miller (born 13 September 1972) is a former professional rugby player from New Zealand who played as a fly half and represented the Japan national rugby union team.

Miller started his career with Bay of Plenty and played in the inaugural 1996 Super 12 season for the Canterbury Crusaders, before moving to Japan to play for the Kobelco Steelers.

After qualifying to play for Japan through residency, Miller made his international debut in May 2002 against Russia. Graham Henry said that he could have pushed for a place in the All Blacks side.

He was selected for the Japan squad for the 2003 Rugby World Cup. where he kept the leading Japanese points scorer of all time Keiji Hirose out of the team and was credited with helping them to some credible performances and was noted as one of Japan's best players at the tournament. He notably scored a 52-metre drop goal against Fiji which was the longest in Rugby World Cup history.

He didn't play again for Japan after the World Cup after they briefly made a policy not to select foreign born players in 2004, and Miller returned to New Zealand to play for Southland.
