= Eric Rush =

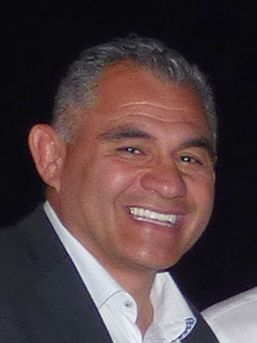
- Rush in 2016
- Born: Eric James Rush; 11 February 1965 (age 61) Kaeo, New Zealand
- Height: 1.83 m (6 ft 0 in)
- Weight: 86 kg (190 lb)
- School: Tangaroa College
- University: University of Auckland
- Occupations: Lawyer; supermarket proprietor

Rugby union career
- Positions: Flanker; wing
Provincial / State sides
Years	Team	Apps	(Points)
1986–1989	Auckland	13	(24)
1991–2000	North Harbour	90	(182)
Super Rugby
Years	Team	Apps	(Points)
1996–1998	Chiefs	18	(50)
International career
Years	Team	Apps	(Points)
1992–1996	New Zealand	9	(25)
1987–1998	New Zealand Māori	30	(57)
National sevens team
Years	Team		Comps
- New Zealand
Medal record
Men's rugby sevens
Representing New Zealand
Commonwealth Games
Gold medal – first place	1998 Kuala Lumpur	Team competition
Gold medal – first place	2002 Manchester	Team competition

Eric James Rush (born 11 February 1965) is a former Māori New Zealand rugby union footballer and rugby sevens player, and now a supermarket owner. His New Zealand Sevens career began in 1988 and ran until 2004. Rush played in more than 60 tournaments, with the highlights being two Commonwealth Games gold medals and the World Cup Sevens victory in 2001. He was also voted Best and Fairest Player at the 1991 Hong Kong Sevens.

He was regarded as a pacy and skillful winger and also played for the All Blacks briefly until the emergence of Jonah Lomu effectively ended his All Blacks career. Lomu played a major role in the 2001 World Cup Sevens win, effectively filling in for Rush, who suffered a broken leg in New Zealand's last group match of that tournament.

== Early life ==
Born in Kaeo on 11 February 1965, Rush was educated at Tangaroa College in the Auckland suburb of Ōtara. He went on to study at the University of Auckland, graduating with a Bachelor of Laws degree in 1988.

== Career ==
Rush switched full-time to rugby sevens in 1999 to compete in the newly formed IRB international Sevens circuit. Rush helped New Zealand to win the first six editions of the World Sevens Series.

Over the course of 14 years, Rush regularly appeared for the New Zealand Sevens team at the Hong Kong Sevens and other sevens tournaments, mostly as captain. In later years, he was converted into a forward in the sevens version, with the wing position given to his understudy Karl Te Nana.

In 15s rugby, Rush played first for Auckland Rugby Union then moved North to play for North Harbour at NPC level, where he blossomed.

=== All Blacks statistics ===
- Tests: 9
- Other games: 20
- Total matches: 29
- Test points: 25pts (5t, 0c, 0p, 0dg)
- Other game points: 65pts (13t, 0c, 0p, 0dg)
- Total points: 90pts (18t, 0c, 0p, 0dg)

Ref:

== Retirement ==
On retiring from playing in 2005. Rush became assistant to New Zealand Sevens coach Gordon Tietjens.

In 2010 Rush became owner operator of the Browns Bay franchise of the New World Supermarket chain and in February 2014 took over the New World store in Kaikohe. On 17 September 2017 Rush took over ownership of New World, Regent in Whangarei. In 2026, he speaks against the government's attempt to break up Foodstuffs.

In 2020, he completed season 1 of Match Fit, and revealed he had hip and knee replacements. Despite that, his metabolic age was 40 as a 58-year-old, the oldest member of the playing squad, and was by far the fittest player in the team. However, he had been sidelined with heel spur since week 2.
