= Slade McFarland =

New Zealand rugby union player (born 1972)

- Full name: Slade Paul McFarland
- Born: 31 August 1972 (age 54)
- Height: 6 ft 0 in (183 cm)
- Weight: 255 lb (116 kg)

Rugby union career
- Position: Hooker
Provincial / State sides
Years	Team	Apps	(Points)
1993–04	North Harbour	128	(115)
Super Rugby
Years	Team	Apps	(Points)
1996	Chiefs	6	(0)
1999	Blues	11	(10)
2000	Crusaders	9	(0)
2001–02	Blues	22	(5)
2003–04	Crusaders	4	(0)

Slade Paul McFarland (born 31 August 1972) is a New Zealand former professional rugby union player.

== Biography ==
=== Early life ===
Raised in Auckland, McFarland was educated at Dilworth School and Rangitoto College.

=== Rugby career ===
McFarland, a hooker, played over 200 games for East Coast Bays and was a North Harbour provincial player. He earned regular Māori All Blacks selection during his career and was also a New Zealand A representative. His Super 12 career began at the Chiefs in 1996, before multiple stints with both the Blues and Crusaders. He briefly played in Wales for Swansea-based club Dunvant and was a medical joker with Stade Toulousain in the 2005–06 Top 14 season.
