= Dawie du Toit =

South African writer (1870–1936)

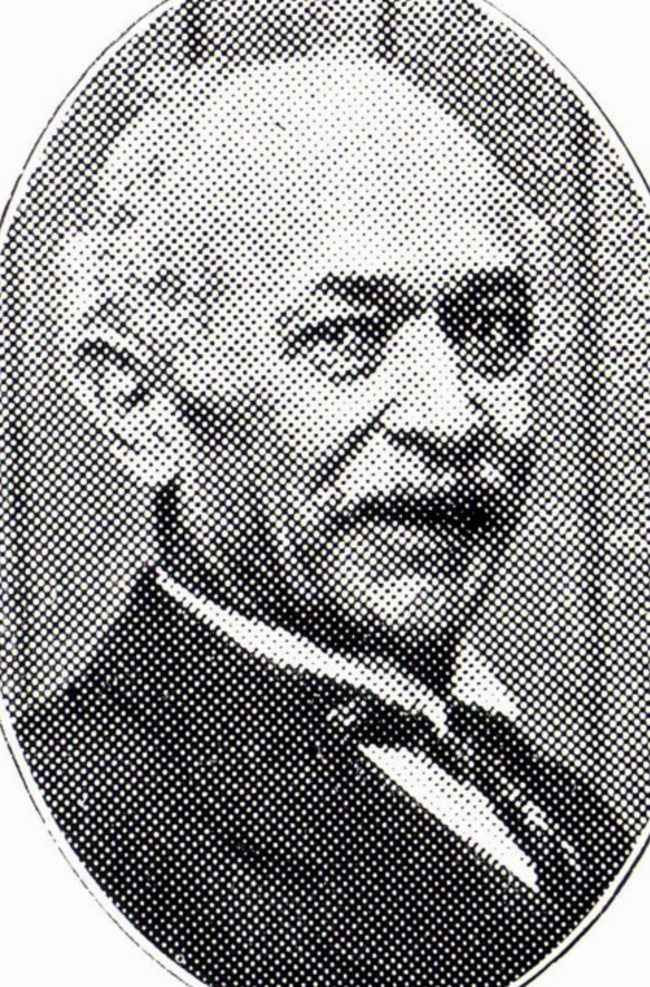
- Born: David Petrus du Toit; 9 December 1870; Paarl, South Africa
- Died: June 26, 1936 (aged 65); Wellington, South Africa
- Occupations: Writer and minister
- Writing career
- Language: English, Afrikaans

David Petrus "Dawie" du Toit (9 December 1870 – 26 July 1936) was a journalist and newspaper editor, as well as the author of the first Afrikaans drama and several novels.

== Biography ==
David Petrus du Toit was born on 9 December 1870 on the farm Pakhuisdam in the Perdeberg, Paarl. He attended school at the Memorial School in Daljosafat, where Rev. F.S. du Toit was the principal and he had A.G. Visser, Totius and D.F. Malherbe as schoolmates.

Although he was initially destined to become a farmer, he turned to journalism after sustaining an injury that made him unfit for the hard work of the farm. In 1892 he went to Paarl where he accepted a position as a journalist for Die Afrikaanse Patriot. That same year he was transferred to Somerset East to take over the editorial staff of the newly founded Het Oosten, a mouthpiece for the Afrikaner Bond. Here he wrote and performed the first Afrikaans play, namely Di bedriegers, which only appeared in print much later. He was also a founder of the Somerset East Debating Society.

In about 1895 he returned to the Memorial School for further study. He was secretary of the first Afrikaans Language Congress in Paarl in 1896, after which he served on the editorial board with the founding of Ons Klyntji in 1896. In 1897 he left for Cape Town to serve on the editorial board of Ons Land. The board of directors of De Middellandsche Afrikaner in Cradock needed an editor in 1899 and this position was offered to Du Toit. However, at the outbreak of the Anglo Boer War, the publication of this paper (which was ardently pro-Boer) was prohibited and he was forced to return to the Boland until the war was over. After the Peace of Vereeniging in 1902 he took up this position again in Cradock. As early as 1905 he advocated the official recognition of Afrikaans in this newspaper. In 1908 he left for Bloemfontein where he was attached to the editorial staff of De Vriend des Volks and from 1909 to 1914 he was editor of Het Westen in Potchefstroom. From 1914 to 1915 he was editor of De Afrikaner in Pietermaritzburg and then from 1915 until his retirement in 1933 he was sub-editor of Die Burger in Cape Town. Here he became known for his regular column Oom Dawie.

After his retirement he lived with his brother-in-law, F.J. Cillié, in the Bovlei until his death. He died on 26 July 1936 near Wellington and was buried in the family cemetery at Kleinbosch in Dal Josafat.

== Bibliography ==
- Antonissen, Rob. Die Afrikaanse letterkunde van aanvang tot hede. Nasou Beperk Derde hersiene uitgawe Tweede druk 1964
- Bosman, F.C.L. Di Bedriegers, Magrita Prinslo en ander Afrikaanse dramas en samesprake tot 1900. Human & Rousseau Kaapstad Heruitgawe 1975
- Dekker, G. Afrikaanse Literatuurgeskiedenis. Nasou Beperk Kaapstad Elfde druk 1970
- Grové, A.P. Letterkundige sakwoordeboek vir Afrikaans. Nasou Beperk Vyfde uitgawe Eerste druk 1988
- Kannemeyer, J.C. Geskiedenis van die Afrikaanse literatuur 1. Academica, Pretoria en Kaapstad Tweede druk 1984
- Kannemeyer, J.C. Die Afrikaanse literatuur 1652–2004. Human & Rousseau Kaapstad en Pretoria Eerste uitgawe 2005
- Nasionale Pers Beperk. Ons skrywers en hul werke: ’n Plate-album. Nasionale Pers Bpk. Kaapstad 1936
- Nienaber, P.J. Hier is ons skrywers! Afrikaanse Pers-Boekhandel Johannesburg Eerste uitgawe 1949
- Nienaber, P.J.; Senekal, J.H en Bothma, T.C. Mylpale in die geskiedenis van die Afrikaanse letterkunde. Afrikaanse Pers-Boekhandel Tweede hersiene uitgawe 1963
- Schoonees, P.C. Die prosa van die tweede Afrikaanse beweging. J.H. de Bussy, Pretoria / Hollandsch-Afrikaansche Uitgevers Maatschappij v/h J. Dusseau & Co, Kaapstad 1939 (derde druk)
- Van Coller, H.P. (red.) Perspektief en Profiel Deel I. J.L. van Schaik-Uitgewers Pretoria Eerste uitgawe 1998
