= Jason Madz =

- Born: 3 February 1973 (age 53)
- School: Trinity Grammar School
- University: University of Sydney

Rugby union career
- Position: Centre
Super Rugby
Years	Team	Apps	(Points)
1996–97	Waratahs	18	(25)

Jason Madz (born 3 February 1973) is an Australian former professional rugby union player.

Madz attended Trinity Grammar School and the University of Sydney. He was an Australian under-21s, Emerging Wallabies and Australian Universities representative. A centre, Madz was runner-up in the Shute Shield's best and fairest in 1995 playing with West Harbour, then appeared in the first two Super 12 seasons with the Waratahs. Before retiring, Madz had several seasons in France with Pau and Toulon. He represented Israel in rugby sevens.
