= Richard Turner (rugby union) =

NZ international rugby union player

- Born: Richard Steven Turner; 15 March 1968 (age 58) Napier, New Zealand
- Height: 1.95 m (6 ft 5 in)
- Weight: 110 kg (240 lb)
- School: Napier Boys' High School

Rugby union career
- Position: Number 8
Senior career
Years	Team	Apps	(Points)
1997	Amatori Rugby Milano		
–	World Fighting Bull		
Provincial / State sides
Years	Team	Apps	(Points)
1986–88	Hawke's Bay	18	
1989–96	North Harbour	86	
Super Rugby
Years	Team	Apps	(Points)
1996	Chiefs	9	
International career
Years	Team	Apps	(Points)
1992	New Zealand	2	(4)

Richard Steven Turner (born 15 March 1968) is a former New Zealand rugby union player. A number 8, Turner represented Hawke's Bay and North Harbour at a provincial level, and the Chiefs in Super Rugby. He was a member of the New Zealand national side, the All Blacks, in 1992, playing two matches, both of them internationals. Turner lives north of Auckland now, is co-owner of a construction company and a commentator for Sky Sport.
