= Brad Fleming =

- Full name: Bradley Fleming
- Born: 26 January 1976 (age 50) Tauranga, New Zealand
- Height: 180 cm (5 ft 11 in)
- Weight: 88 kg (13 st 12 lb; 194 lb)

Rugby union career
- Position: Wing
Super Rugby
Years	Team	Apps	(Points)
1996	Crusaders	5	(10)
1999–2002	Hurricanes	8	(25)
2003	Highlanders	8	(15)
National sevens team
Years	Team		Comps
1995–2004	New Zealand		35
Medal record
Men's rugby sevens
Representing New Zealand
Commonwealth Games
Gold medal – first place	2002 Manchester	Team competition

Bradley Fleming (born 26 January 1976) is a rugby union footballer from New Zealand, who plays in the wing position. He won a gold medal as part of the New Zealand sevens rugby team at the 2002 Commonwealth Games.
