= Norm Berryman =

New Zealand rugby union player (1973–2015)

- Born: Norman Rangi Berryman; 15 April 1973 Wellington, New Zealand
- Died: 23 June 2015 (aged 42) Perth, Western Australia
- Height: 1.80 m (5 ft 11 in)
- Weight: 108 kg (17 st 0 lb)
- School: Church College

Rugby union career
- Position(s): Centre, Winger
Senior career
Years	Team	Apps	(Points)
- Castres Olympique
–	CS Bourgoin-Jallieu		
- Correct as of 2007-01-17
Provincial / State sides
Years	Team	Apps	(Points)
1991–2000, 2003	Northland	107	
- Correct as of 2015-06-25
Super Rugby
Years	Team	Apps	(Points)
1996	Chiefs		
1997	Blues	3	(0)
1998–2000	Crusaders	30	(75)
International career
Years	Team	Apps	(Points)
1998	All Blacks	1	(0)
1995–2000, 2003	Māori All Blacks		
- Correct as of 2015-06-25

Norman Rangi Berryman (15 April 1973 – 22 June 2015) was a New Zealand rugby union player who played as a winger and centre. He played one Test for the All Blacks, and represented Northland, the Crusaders and the Chiefs in New Zealand. In France, he played for Castres Olympique and CS Bourgoin-Jallieu.

== Representative career ==
Berryman first played first class rugby as an 18-year-old for Northland in the National Provincial Championship (NPC), in 1991. The next year he played in the New Zealand (All Black) trial, but wasn't picked for the national team. He continued to play for Northland, and in 1996 joined the Chiefs for the new Super 12. Berryman was drafted into the Blues in 1997, and eventually into the Crusaders in 1998. With the Crusaders he won three Super 12 championships (1998, 1999, and 2000).

Teammate Justin Marshall: "At the Crusaders, we were very structured and defence orientated and he definitely wasn't that. [Berryman] would play off the cuff and he enabled us to use our defence to swing on to attack. It was vital. And the crowd loved him."

During the 2000 NPC, he left New Zealand for France, playing for Castres Olympique then CS Bourgoin-Jallieu. He returned to New Zealand in May 2003. Berryman rejoined Northland for the 2003 NPC, playing his 100th game for the team that year. In 2004, Berryman moved to Sydney, New South Wales, Australia, where he played for Southern Districts in 2005.

== International career ==
Berryman played one Test for the All Blacks, as a replacement against South Africa in 1998. He also played for New Zealand A in the tour to Samoa that year, and in 1999.

He was a member of the New Zealand Māori in 1992, and from 1995–2000. On his return to New Zealand in 2003 he was selected for the Māori again, this time for their tour of Canada.

== Personal life ==
Berryman was born in Wellington, moving to Whangarei as a child. He began playing rugby at Whangarei Intermediate School, continuing through Whangarei Boys' High School and Church College. He had six children. His niece, Kennedy Cherrington, is an Australian dual-code rugby player.

From 2004, Berryman lived in Australia–first residing in Sydney, then Western Australia. In Perth, he stayed involved in club rugby, playing in the third-grade Kalamunda team, and coaching at his son's club, Wanneroo. He died of a heart attack in Perth on 22 June 2015, aged 42.
