= Justin Swart =

South African rugby union player

- Born: Justin Stefan Swart; 23 July 1972 (age 54) Stellenbosch, Western Cape
- Height: 1.85 m (6 ft 1 in)
- Weight: 93 kg (205 lb)
- School: Paul Roos Gymnasium
- University: Stellenbosch University

Rugby union career
Provincial / State sides
Years	Team	Apps	(Points)
1993–1998	Western Province	93	(315)
1999–2003	Sharks (Currie Cup)	42	(100)
2000–2001	Otago	8	
Super Rugby
Years	Team	Apps	(Points)
1998	Stormers	6	
1999–2003	Sharks	40	(35)
International career
Years	Team	Apps	(Points)
1996–1997	South Africa	10	(5)

Justin Stefan Swart (born 23 July 1972) is a former South African rugby union player.

== Playing career ==
Swart received his schooling at Paul Roos Gymnasium in Stellenbosch and was selected for the Western Province schools team that competed at the annual Craven Week tournament in 1990 and 1991. In 1991 he was selected for the South African schools team and after school he enrolled at Stellenbosch University for a degree in physical education. Swart made his provincial debut for Western Province against Eastern Province in 1993 and represented the union 93 times and also equalled Carel du Plessis' record during the 1997 season, scoring 25 tries for the season. Swart also played representative rugby for Sharks in the Currie Cup competition, the Sharks in Super Rugby, as well as for the New Zealand side, Otago.

Swart made his test debut for the Springboks against the Fiji at Loftus Versfeld in 1996. At the end of 1997 he toured with the Springboks to Europe. In addition to the 10 Test matches he played, he also played three tour matches and scored 2 tries for the Springboks.

== See also ==
- List of South Africa national rugby union players – Springbok no. 630
