= Alistair Murdoch =

Australian rugby union international

- Full name: Alistair Richard Murdoch
- Born: 9 May 1967 (age 59) Sydney, Australia
- Height: 6 ft 1 in (185 cm)
- Weight: 202 lb (92 kg)
- School: Shore School
- Occupation: Financial advisor

Rugby union career
- Position: Centre / Winger
International career
Years	Team	Apps	(Points)
1993–96	Australia	2	(5)

Alistair Richard Murdoch (born 9 May 1967) is an Australian former rugby union international.

Murdoch, born in Sydney, was educated at the Shore School and played first-grade rugby for Gordon.

A three-quarter, Murdoch earned his first Wallabies call up after a two-try man of the match performance to help the New South Wales Waratahs beat the visiting Springboks in 1993. For one of his tries, he ran 65 metres down the sideline, evading three Springbok defenders in the process. He subsequently made his Test debut in Bordeaux during that year's tour of France, playing on the left wing. His only other Wallabies cap came three years later, as a winger against Wales at Ballymore, where he scored a late try in a resounding win.

Murdoch played rugby in England for Bedford, Exeter and Worcester.

A financial advisor by profession, Murdoch took up powerlifting after rugby and won three successive World Drug-Free Powerlifting Federation titles in the 110kg weight class.

== See also ==
- List of Australia national rugby union players
