= Gavin Lawless =

South African rugby union player

- Born: 28 April 1970 (age 56) South Africa
- Height: 1.82 m (6 ft 0 in)
- Weight: 90

Rugby union career
- Position: Fullback
Provincial / State sides
Years	Team	Apps	(Points)
1992-1995	Western Province		
1996	Transvaal		
1997–98	Sharks (Currie Cup)		
1999	Pumas		
Super Rugby
Years	Team	Apps	(Points)
1996	Lions		
1997–98	Sharks		
1999	Bulls		

Gavin Lawless is a former South African rugby union player.

Playing as fullback, he set a number of point scoring records, including the most tries and most points in a Super 12 match (4 tries and 50 points, for the Sharks against the Highlanders in 1997), the most penalties in a Currie Cup season (48 for Transvaal in 1996), and the most penalties in a Currie Cup final (6, for Transvaal vs. Sharks in 1996).
