= List of South Africa national under-18 rugby union team players =

Below is a listing of all rugby union players that have represented the South Africa Under-18 (South Africa Schools) side since 1974.

2019 SA Schools squad
Name	Position	School	Union
Blaine Golden	Prop	Glenwood	Sharks
Bryan le Roux	Prop	Rondebosch	Western Province
Okuhle Siyeni	Prop	Westville Boys' High School	Sharks
Jan-Hendrik Wessels	Prop	Grey College	Free State Cheetahs
Jacques Goosen	Hooker	Selborne College	Border
André Venter	Hooker	Grey College	Free State Cheetahs
Dylan de Leeuw	Lock	Paul Roos Gymnasium	Western Province
Connor Evans	Lock	Bishops Diocesan College	Western Province
Kabasele Hope	Lock	Queens High School	Lions
Simon Miller	Lock	St Alban's College	Blue Bulls
George Cronjé	Loose forward	Grey College	Free State Cheetahs
Keketso Morabe	Loose forward	Welkom Gymnasium	Griffons
Siyemukela Ndlovu	Loose forward	Northwood	Sharks
Jarrod Taylor	Loose forward	Selborne College	Border
Gideon van Wyk	Loose forward	Paarl Boys' High School	Western Province
Dylan Alexander	Scrum-half	Paarl Gimnasium	Western Province
Jurich Claasens	Scrum-half	Garsfontein	Blue Bulls
Boldwin Hansen	Fly-half	Hermanus High	Boland
Kean Meadon	Fly-half	Paarl Boys' High School	Western Province
Tyler Bocks	Centre	Paarl Boys' High School	Western Province
Henco van Wyk	Centre	Monument High School	Golden Lions
Mntungwa Mapantsela	Centre	Selborne College	Border
Geraldo Flusk	Outside back	Garsfontein	Blue Bulls
Keane Galant	Outside back	HTS Drostdy	Boland
Zeilinga Strydom	Outside back	Garsfontein	Blue Bulls
Tarquin Manuel	Outside back	HS Stellenberg	Western Province

2018 SA Schools squad
Name	Position	School	Union
Herman Agenbag	Prop	Grey College	Free State Cheetahs
Dewald Donald	Prop	Affies	Blue Bulls
Hanru Jacobs	Prop	Paul Roos Gymnasium	Western Province
Thabiso Mdletshe	Prop	Glenwood	Sharks
Banele Mthenjane	Prop	Hoërskool Nelspruit	Pumas
Jacques Goosen	Hooker	Selborne College	Border
Jean-Jacques Kotze	Hooker	Paul Roos Gymnasium	Western Province
Adrian Alberts	Lock	HJS Paarl	Western Province
Lunga Ncube	Lock	Glenwood	Sharks
Sibusiso Sangweni	Lock	Kearsney College	Sharks
Emile van Heerden	Lock	HJS Paarl	Western Province
Tristan Dullisear	Loose forward	Monument	Golden Lions
Celimpilo Gumede	Loose forward	Durban High School	Sharks
De Wet Marais	Loose forward	Grey College	Free State Cheetahs
Mihlali Mgolodela	Loose forward	Rondebosch	Western Province
Keketso Morabe	Loose forward	Welkom Gim	Griffons
Evan Roos	Loose forward	HJS Paarl	Western Province
Jarrod Taylor	Loose forward	Selborne College	Border
Thomas Bursey	Scrum-half	Selborne College	Border
Jurich Claasens	Scrum-half	Garsfontein	Blue Bulls
Lionel April	Fly-half	Hermanus High	Western Province
Juan Mostert	Fly-half	Paul Roos Gymnasium	Western Province
Rynhardt Jonker	Centre	Glenwood	Sharks
Muzilikazi Manyike	Centre	Jeppe	Golden Lions
Lwandile Menze	Centre	Durban High School	Sharks
Brendan Venter	Centre	Paul Roos Gymnasium	Western Province
Mnombo Zwelindaba	Centre	Selborne College	Border
Stravino Jacobs	Wing	Paarl Gimnasium	Western Province
Wyclef Vlitoor	Wing	Grey College	Free State Cheetahs
Darren Hendricks	Fullback	Boland Landbou	Western Province
Sibabalwe Xamlashe	Fullback	Selborne College	Border

2017 SA Schools squad
Name	Position	School	Union
Jordan Clarke	Prop	Glenwood	Sharks
Nkosi Masuku	Prop	Parktown Boys	Golden Lions
Banele Mthejane	Prop	Hoërskool Nelspruit	Pumas
Keagan Glade	Prop	KES	Golden Lions
Asenathi Ntlabakanye	Prop	St Stithians College	Golden Lions
Morne Brandon	Hooker	Monument	Golden Lions
Ruhann Greyling	Hooker	Grey College	Free State Cheetahs
Fez Mbatha	Hooker	Maritzburg College	Sharks
Adrian Alberts	Lock	HJS Paarl	Western Province
Celimpilo Gumede	Lock	Durban High School	Sharks
JJ van der Mescht	Lock	Glenwood	Sharks
Christen van Niekerk	Lock	Monument	Golden Lions
Vian Fourie	Flank	HJS Paarl	Western Province
Mark Snyman	Flank	Helpmekaar Kollege	Golden Lions
Dylan Richardson	Flank	Kearsney College	Sharks
Henco Martins	Flank	Paarl Gimnasium	Western Province
Phepsi Buthelezi	Number 8	Durban High School	Sharks
Travis Gordon	Number 8	KES	Golden Lions
Jaden Hendrikse	Scrum-half	Glenwood	Sharks
Sanele Nohamba	Scrum-half	Durban High School	Sharks
Christopher Schreuder	Fly-half	Grey College	Free State Cheetahs
Stephan van der Bank	Fly-half	Hoërskool Nelspruit	Pumas
Yanga Hlalu	Centre	KES	Golden Lions
Rikus Pretorius	Centre	Grey College	Free State Cheetahs
Diego Appolis	Centre	Hoërskool Garsfontein	Blue Bulls
Conan Le Fleur	Centre	Glenwood	Sharks
Muller du Plessis	Wing	Paarl Gimnasium	Western Province
Andrew Kota	Wing	Welkom Gim	Griffons
Kennedy Mpeku	Fullback	KES	Golden Lions

2016 SA Schools squad
Name	Position	School	Union
Reece Bezuidenhout	Prop	HJS Paarl	Western Province
Nathan McBeth	Prop	Monument	Golden Lions
Johan Neethling	Prop	HJS Paarl	Western Province
Sazi Sandi	Prop	St Andrews (EC)	Eastern Province
PJ Botha	Hooker	Monument	Golden Lions
Dan Jooste	Hooker	HJS Paarl	Western Province
Ben-Jason Dixon	Lock	Paul Roos Gymnasium	Western Province
Salmaan Moerat	Lock	HJS Paarl	Western Province
JC Pretorius	Flank	HTS Middleburg	Pumas
Charl Serdyn	Flank	HJS Paarl	Western Province
Muller Uys	Flank	Paarl Gimnasium	Western Province
Khanya Ncusane	Flank	HJS Paarl	Western Province
Kewzi Mafu	Number 8	Grey High	Eastern Province
Richman Gora	Scrum-half	Welkom Gim	Griffons
Rewan Kruger	Scrum-half	Grey College	Free State Cheetahs
Rewan de Swardt	Fly-half	Affies	Blue Bulls
Damian Willemse	Fly-half	Paul Roos Gymnasium	Western Province
Rikus Pretorius	Centre	Grey College	Free State Cheetahs
Wandisile Simelane	Centre	Jeppe	Golden Lions
Manuel Rass	Centre	HJS Paarl	Western Province
Emilio Adonis	Centre	Hoërskool Garsfontein	Blue Bulls
Muller du Plessis	Wing	Paarl Gimnasium	Western Province
Mike Mavovana	Wing	Rondebosch	Western Province
Gianni Lombard	Fullback	HJS Paarl	Western Province
Sihle Njezula	Fullback	Grey High	Eastern Province

2016 SA Schools A squad
Name	Position	School	Union
Cabous Eloff	Prop	Affies	Blue Bulls
Mornay Smith	Prop	Hoërskool Eldoraigne	Blue Bulls
Keegan Glade	Prop	KES	Golden Lions
Gugu Nelqani	Prop	Northwood	Sharks
Schalk Erasmus	Hooker	Affies	Blue Bulls
Dylan Richardson	Hooker	Kearsney College	Sharks
Rhyno Pieterse	Lock	Garsfontein	Blue Bulls
JJ van der Mescht	Lock	Glenwood	Sharks
Jaco van Tonder	Lock	Grey College	Free State Cheetahs
Christopher Havenga	Lock	Monument High School	Golden Lions
Ruan Vermaak	Lock	Monument High School	Golden Lions
Athi Magwala	Loose forward	Boland Landbou	Western Province
Mark Snyman	Loose forward	Helpmekaar Kollege	Golden Lions
Dian Schoonees	Loose forward	Grey College	Free State Cheetahs
Jesse Johnson	Loose forward	Paul Roos Gymnasium	Western Province
Francke Horn	No.8	Paarl Boys' High School	Western Province
Sanele Nohamba	Scrum-half	Durban High School	Sharks
Zinedine Booysen	Scrum-half	Oakdale	SWD
Lubabalo Dobela	Flyhalf	Grey High	Eastern Province
Tyrone Green	Flyhalf	Jeppe	Golden Lions
Louritz van der Schyff	Centre	Affies	Blue Bulls
Jaco van Heyningen	Centre	Grey College	Free State Cheetahs
Sicelo Tole	Centre	Muir College	Eastern Province
Ayabonga Oliphant	Wing	Grey High	Eastern Province
Tadendaishe Mujawo	Wing	St Benedict's College	Golden Lions

2015 SA Schools squad
Name	Position	School	Union
Ashwyn Adams	Prop	Rondebosch	Western Province
Cabous Eloff	Prop	Affies	Blue Bulls
Dewald Maritz	Prop	Hoërskool Nelspruit	Pumas
Carlü Sadie	Prop	Hoërskool Bellville	Western Province
Johan Grobbelaar	Hooker	Paarl Gimnasium	Western Province
Nico Peyper	Hooker	EG Jansen	Falcons
Ruben de Villiers	Lock	HJS Paarl	Western Province
Ruben van Heerden	Lock	Affies	Blue Bulls
Salmaan Moerat	Lock	HJS Paarl	Western Province
Hendré Stassen	Lock	EG Jansen	Falcons
Hacjivah Dayimani	Flank	Jeppe	Golden Lions
Ernst van Rhyn	Flank	Paarl Gimnasium	Western Province
Johan Visser	Flank	Paarl Gimnasium	Western Province
Cobus Wiese	Flank	Hoërskool Upington	Griquas CD
Zain Davids	Flank	Rondebosch	Western Province
Kwezi Mafu	Number 8	Grey High	Eastern Province
Embrose Papier	Scrum-half	Garsfontein	Blue Bulls
Jondre Williams	Scrum-half	Boland Landbou	Western Province
Curwin Bosch	Fly-half	Grey High	Eastern Province
Damian Willemse	Fly-half	Paul Roos Gymnasium	Western Province
Davids Brits	Centre	Selborne College	Border
Stedman Gans	Centre	Hoërskool Waterkloof	Blue Bulls
Wandisile Simelane	Centre	Jeppe	Golden Lions
Manuel Rass	Centre	HJS Paarl	Western Province
Heino Bezuidenhout	Centre	HTS Daniel Pienaar	Eastern Province
Nico Leonard	Wing	Paul Roos Gymnasium	Western Province
Manie Libbok	Wing	Hoërskool Outeniqua	SWD
Andell Loubser	Fullback	Hoërskool Menlopark	Blue Bulls
Joshua Vermeulen	Fullback	Paul Roos Gymnasium	Western Province

2014 SA Schools squad
Name	Position	School	Union
Ngoni Chidoma	Prop	Northwood	Sharks
Michael Kumbirai	Prop	St Albans	Blue Bulls
Ignatius Prinsloo	Prop	Grey College	Free State Cheetahs
Lupumlo Mguca	Prop	HTS Daniel Pienaar	Eastern Province
Sarel-Marco Smit	Prop	Hoërskool Eldoraigne	Blue Bulls
Kenny van Niekerk	Prop	Glenwood	Sharks
Le Roux Baard	Hooker	Outeniqua	SWD
Jan-Henning Campher	Hooker	Hoërskool Eldoraigne	Blue Bulls
Aston Fortuin	Lock	Southdowns	Blue Bulls
Jaco Willemse	Lock	Paarl Gimnasium	Western Province
Eduard Zandberg	Lock	Outeniqua	SWD
Victor Maruping	Flank	Louis Botha	Free State Cheetahs
Arnold Gerber	Flank	Hoërskool Menlopark	Blue Bulls
Edmund Rheeder	Flank	Klerksdorp	Leopards
Cobus Wiese	Flank	Hoërskool Upington	Griquas CD
Jaco Coetzee	Number 8	Glenwood	Sharks
Junior Pokomela	Number 8	Grey High	Eastern Province
Embrose Papier	Scrum-half	Garsfontein	Blue Bulls
Marco Jansen van Vuren	Scrum-half	Transvalia	Falcons
Curwin Bosch	Fly-half	Grey High	Eastern Province
Tinus de Beer	Fly-half	Hoërskool Waterkloof	Blue Bulls
Barend Smit	Centre	HTS Middleburg	Pumas
JT Jackson	Centre	Oakdale	SWD
Heino Bezuidenhout	Centre	HTS Daniel Pienaar	Eastern Province
Jerry Danquah	Wing	Queens College	Border
Andell Loubser	Wing	Hoërskool Menlopark	Blue Bulls
Nazo Nkala	Wing	Welkom Gim	Griffons
Morné Joubert	Fullback	Glenwood	Sharks
Keanu Vers	Fullback	Grey High	Eastern Province
Eduan Keyter	Fullback	Affies	Blue Bulls

2013 SA Schools squad
Name	Position	School	Union
Thomas du Toit	Prop	HJS Paarl	Western Province
Thabani Mtsi	Prop	Selborne College	Border
Conraad van Vuuren	Prop	Nelspruit	Pumas
Ruan Kramer	Prop	Grey College	Free State Cheetahs
Ox Nché	Prop	Louis Botha	Free State Cheetahs
Joseph Dweba	Hooker	Florida	Golden Lions
Francois Steyn	Hooker	Affies	Blue Bulls
Dan du Plessis	Hooker	HJS Paarl	Western Province
RG Snyman	Lock	Affies	Blue Bulls
Dan du Preez	Lock	Kearsney College	Sharks
JD Schickerling	Lock	Paarl Gimnasium	Western Province
Abongile Nonkontwana	Flank	St Albans	Blue Bulls
Fiffy Rampeta	Flank	Louis Botha	Free State Cheetahs
Jacques Vermeulen	Flank	Paarl Gimnasium	Western Province
PJ Toerien	Flank	Garsfontein	Blue Bulls
Jean-Luc du Preez	Flank	Kearsney College	Sharks
Rikus Bothma	Number 8	Paarl Gimnasium	Western Province
Remu Malan	Scrum-half	Outeniqua	SWD
Marco Jansen van Vuren	Scrum-half	Transvalia	Falcons
Justin Phillips	Scrum-half	Hoërskool Waterkloof	Blue Bulls
Dewald Human	Fly-half	Outeniqua	SWD
Brandon Thompson	Fly-half	Ermelo	Pumas
Daniël du Plessis	Centre	Paul Roos Gymnasium	Western Province
Warrick Gelant	Centre	Outeniqua	SWD
Jurie Linde	Centre	Affies	Blue Bulls
Grant Hermanus	Wing	Paarl Gimnasium	Western Province
Leolin Zas	Wing	Hermanus	Boland
Duhan van der Merwe	Wing	Outeniqua	SWD
Malcolm Jaer	Fullback	Brandwag (EC)	Eastern Province
EW Viljoen	Fullback	Grey College	Free State Cheetahs

2012 SA Schools squad
Name	Position	School	Union
Wilco Louw	Prop	HTS Drostdy	Boland
Dayan van der Westhuizen	Prop	Centurion	Blue Bulls
Pierre Schoeman	Prop	Affies	Blue Bulls
Ox Nché	Prop	Louis Botha	Free State Cheetahs
Francois Esterhuizen	Hooker	Overberg	Boland
Malcolm Marx	Hooker	KES	Golden Lions
Gideon Koegelenberg	Lock	Hugenote	Sharks
Nico Janse van Rensburg	Lock	Affies	Blue Bulls
Dan du Preez	Lock	Kearsney College	Sharks
JD Schickerling	Lock	Paarl Gimnasium	Western Province
Abongile Nonkontwana	Flank	St Albans	Blue Bulls
Thabo Mabuza	Flank	Centurion	Blue Bulls
Jean-Luc du Preez	Flank	Kearsney College	Sharks
Aidon Davis	Number 8	Daniel Pienaar	Eastern Province
Jano Venter	Number 8	HTS Middleburg	Pumas
Akhona Sihunu	Scrum-half	Dale College	Border
Justin Phillips	Scrum-half	Hoërskool Waterkloof	Blue Bulls
Handre Pollard	Fly-half	Paarl Gimnasium	Western Province
Ryno Eksteen	Fly-half	Affies	Blue Bulls
Sandile Kubeka	Centre	Kearsney College	Sharks
Warrick Gelant	Centre	Outeniqua	SWD
Jurie Linde	Centre	Affies	Blue Bulls
Rohan Janse van Rensburg	Centre	Hoërskool Waterkloof	Blue Bulls
Jixie Molapo	Wing	Ben Vorster	Limpopo Blue Bulls
Duhan van der Merwe	Wing	Outeniqua	SWD
Sergeal Petersen	Wing	Grey High	Eastern Province
Jesse Kriel	Fullback	Maritzburg College	Sharks

2011 SA Schools squad
Name	Position	School	Union
Marné Coetzee	Prop	Hoërskool Waterkloof	Blue Bulls
Andrew Beerwinkel	Prop	Porteville	Boland
Pierre Schoeman	Prop	Affies	Blue Bulls
Eugene Le Maitre	Hooker	Marais Viljoen	Golden Lions
Morne du Plessis	Hooker	Hoërskool Waterkloof	Blue Bulls
Jacques du Plessis	Lock	Ermelo	Pumas
Philip du Preez	Lock	Monument	Golden Lions
Irné Herbst	Lock	Hoërskool Waterkloof	Blue Bulls
Leneve Damens	Flank	Grey College	Free State Cheetahs
Thabo Mabuza	Flank	Centurion	Blue Bulls
Ruan Steenkamp	Number 8	Monument	Golden Lions
Sikhumbuzo Notshe	Number 8	Wynberg Boys	Western Province
Percy Williams	Scrum-half	Oudtshoorn	SWD
Nhlanhla Hlongwane	Scrum-half	Louis Botha	Free State Cheetahs
Jaco van der Walt	Fly-half	Monument	Golden Lions
Tim Swiel	Fly-half	Bishops	Western Province
Pieter Jordaan	Fly-half	Grey College	Free State Cheetahs
Tyler Fisher	Centre	Westville	Sharks
Dries Swanepoel	Centre	Grey College	Free State Cheetahs
Jan Serfontein	Centre	Grey College	Free State Cheetahs
Siyabonga Tom	Wing	Glenwood	Sharks
JP Lewis	Wing	Paul Roos Gymnasium	Western Province
Ruwellyn Isbell	Wing	Grey College	Free State Cheetahs
Sean Robinson	Fullback	Hoërskool Waterkloof	Blue Bulls

2010 SA Schools squad
Name	Position	School	Union
Allan Dell	Prop	Queens College	Border
Steven Kitshoff	Prop	Paul Roos Gymnasium	Western Province
Neethling Fouche	Prop	Grey College	Free State Cheetahs
Anrich Bitzi	Hooker	Grey College	Free State Cheetahs
Jason Thomas	Hooker	Muir College	Eastern Province
Ruan Botha	Lock	Jeugland	Falcons
Schalk van Heerden	Lock	Affies	Blue Bulls
Ruan Venter	Lock	Monument	Golden Lions
Wian Liebenberg	Flank	HTS Drostdy	Boland
Khaya Majola	Flank	Westville	Sharks
Sikhumbuzo Notshe	Flank	Wynberg Boys	Western Province
Nardus van der Walt	Number 8	Affies	Blue Bulls
Kevin Luiters	Scrum-half	Grey College	Free State Cheetahs
Rudi van Rooyen	Scrum-half	Affies	Blue Bulls
Johan Goosen	Fly-half	Grey College	Free State Cheetahs
Paul Jordaan	Centre	Grey College	Free State Cheetahs
William Small-Smith	Centre	Grey College	Free State Cheetahs
Andile Jho	Centre	Dale College	Border
Leroy Bitterhout	Wing	Klein Nederberg	Boland
Tshotso Mbovane	Wing	Paul Roos Gymnasium	Western Province
JP Lewis	Wing	Paul Roos Gymnasium	Western Province
Marinus van der Merwe	Fullback	Standerton	Pumas
Craig Barry	Fullback	Paul Roos Gymnasium	Western Province

2009 SA Schools squad
Name	Position	School	Union
Zolani Faku	Prop	Grey High	Eastern Province
Stephanus Kotze	Prop	Grey College	Free State Cheetahs
Frans Malherbe	Prop	HJS Paarl	Western Province
Scarra Ntubeni	Hooker	KES	Golden Lions
Bongi Mbonambi	Hooker	St Albans	Blue Bulls
Frederick Schnetler	Lock	Glenwood	Sharks
Carl Wegner	Lock	Grey College	Free State Cheetahs
Chris Cloete	Flank	Selborne College	Border
Jean Cook	Flank	Grey College	Free State Cheetahs
Lean Schwartz	Flank	Hoërskool Waterkloof	Blue Bulls
Nizaam Carr	Number 8	Bishops	Western Province
Siya Kolisi	Number 8	Grey High	Eastern Province
Pieter Rademan	Scrum-half	Grey College	Free State Cheetahs
Bangi Kobese	Scrum-half	Dale College	Border
Ricky Schroeder	Scrum-half	Paul Roos Gymnasium	Western Province
William van Wyk	Fly-half	Paarl Gimnasium	Western Province
Tony Jantjies	Fly-half	Hoërskool Menlopark	Blue Bulls
JP du Plessis	Centre	Paul Roos Gymnasium	Western Province
Piet Lindeque	Centre	Grey College	Free State Cheetahs
Andile Jho	Centre	Dale College	Border
Sizo Maseko	Wing	Ermelo	Pumas
Brian Skosana	Wing	St Andrews (EC)	Eastern Province
Riaan Britz	Fullback	Grey College	Free State Cheetahs

2008 SA Schools squad
Name	Position	School	Union
Neethling Gericke	Prop	Oakdale	SWD
Njabula Mkize	Prop	Westville	Sharks
Ruan Smith	Prop	Paarl Gimnasium	Western Province
Shaun Malton	Hooker	Glenwood	Sharks
Gareth Topking	Hooker	Rondebosch	Western Province
Neil Kapp	Lock	Hoërskool Outeniqua	SWD
Andries Ferreira	Lock	Affies	Blue Bulls
Mlungisi Bali	Lock	St Albans	Blue Bulls
Helmut Lehmann	Flank	Paarl Gimnasium	Western Province
Petrus Uys	Flank	Monument	Golden Lions
CJ Stander	Number 8	Oakdale	SWD
Chuma Faas	Scrum-half	Grey High	Eastern Province
Sino Nyoka	Scrum-half	Dale College	Border
Franna du Toit	Fly-half	Grey College	Free State Cheetahs
Elton Jantjies	Fly-half	Florida	Golden Lions
Garth April	Fly-half	Bergrivier	Boland
Wandile Mjekevu	Centre	KES	Golden Lions
Francois Venter	Centre	Grey College	Free State Cheetahs
Tythan Adams	Wing	Paul Roos Gymnasium	Western Province
S'bura Sithole	Wing	Queens College	Border
Abednego Mamushi	Wing	HTS Middleburg	Pumas
Patrick Lambie	Fullback	Michaelhouse	Sharks

2007 SA Schools squad
Name	Position	School	Union
Dale Chadwick	Prop	Westville	Sharks
Coenie Oosthuizen	Prop	Grey College	Free State Cheetahs
Julian Redelinghuys	Prop	Monument	Golden Lions
Moeka Bolofo	Hooker	Westville	Sharks
Sibi Masina	Hooker	Standerton	Pumas
JC Oberholzer	Hooker	Jan Viljoen	Golden Lions
Cornell Hess	Lock	Affies	Blue Bulls
Kene Ockafor	Lock	Kearsney College	Sharks
Marchand van Rooyen	Lock	Jan Viljoen	Golden Lions
Roelof Pienaar	Flank	Grey College	Free State Cheetahs
Marnus Schoeman	Flank	Hoërskool Waterkloof	Blue Bulls
Nick Koster	Number 8	Bishops	Western Province
Kalvano King	Scrum-half	Alexandria	Eastern Province
Rudy Paige	Scrum-half	Bastion	Golden Lions
Izak Muller	Scrum-half	Grey College	Free State Cheetahs
Marnitz Boshoff	Fly-half	Hoërskool Nelspruit	Pumas
Robert Ebersohn	Centre	Grey College	Free State Cheetahs
Earl Snyman	Centre	Hoërskool Outeniqua	SWD
Headley Smith	Centre	Grey College	Free State Cheetahs
Riaan Arendse	Wing	Brandwag (EC)	Eastern Province
Omphile Morotothe	Wing	Pretoria Boys	Blue Bulls
Yondela Stampu	Wing	St Albans	Blue Bulls
Patrick Lambie	Fullback	Michaelhouse	Sharks

2006 SA Schools squad
Name	Position	School	Union
Frik Kirsten	Prop	Affies	Blue Bulls
RC du Toit	Prop	Dr EG Jansen	Golden Lions
Julian Redelinghuys	Prop	Monument	Golden Lions
Alfried Ries	Hooker	Monument	Golden Lions
PW van Vuuren	Hooker	Grey College	Free State Cheetahs
Cornell Hess	Lock	Affies	Blue Bulls
JP Mostert	Lock	Brits	Leopards
Yaya Hartzenberg	Flank	HJS Paarl	Western Province
Marnus Schoeman	Flank	Hoërskool Waterkloof	Blue Bulls
MB Lusaseni	Number 8	Selborne College	Border
Nick Koster	Number 8	Bishops	Western Province
Marlin Ruiters	Scrum-half	Grey High	Eastern Province
Clayton Stewart	Scrum-half	Strand	Western Province
Justin Botha	Fly-half	Monument	Golden Lions
Ntokozo Mashele	Centre	Hoërskool Nelspruit	Pumas
Milo Nqoro	Centre	St Johns	Golden Lions
Divan Kotze	Centre	Hoërskool Waterkloof	Blue Bulls
Stefan Watermeyer	Centre	Hoërskool Waterkloof	Blue Bulls
Tshepo Masuga	Wing	Monument	Golden Lions
Vainon Willis	Wing	Hoërskool Waterkloof	Blue Bulls
Cecil Afrika	Fullback	Harmony Sports Academy	Griffons
Aubrey McDonald	Fullback	Hoërskool Waterkloof	Blue Bulls

2005 SA Schools squad
Name	Position	School	Union
Zander de Kock	Prop	Vereeniging	Falcons
Rialoo Ellard	Prop	Landboudal	Griquas
Joseph Oosthuizen	Prop	Grey College	Free State Cheetahs
Divan Kapp	Hooker	HTS Middleburg	Pumas
Edgar Marutlulle	Hooker	Potchefstroom High School for Boys	Leopards
Hansie Moolman	Lock	Ermelo	Pumas
Giant Nkosi	Lock	St Stithians College	Golden Lions
Hendrik Roodt	Lock	Lichtenburg	Leopards
Boetie Britz	Flank	Oakdale	SWD
Vince Gwavu	flank	Daniel Pienaar	Leopards
Pieter Meyer	flank	Potchefstroom High School for Boys	Leopards
Dewald Potgieter	Number 8	Daniel Pienaar	Eastern Province
Mandilakhe Tile	Scrum-half	Dale College	Border
Marlon Lewis	Scrum-half	Bertram	Eastern Province
Andre Smith	Fly-half	Paarl Gimnasium	Western Province
Morne Jooste	Centre	The Settlers	Western Province
PJ Vermeulen	Centre	Noord-Kaap	Griquas
Stefan Watermeyer	Centre	Hoërskool Waterkloof	Blue Bulls
Christopher Juries	Wing	Kingswood	Eastern Province
Rowan Walters	Wing	Upington	Griquas
Chris Micklewood	Fullback	Westville	Sharks
Aubrey McDonald	Fullback	Winterberg	Eastern Province

2004 SA Schools squad
Name	Position	School	Union
Carlo Prinsloo	Prop	Paarl Gimnasium	Western Province
Johan Volschenk	Prop	Oakdale	SWD
JC Strauss	Prop	Kearsney College	Sharks
Stoffel Duvenhage	Hooker	HTS Middleburg	Pumas
Edgar Marutlulle	Hooker	Potchefstroom High School for Boys	Leopards
Johan Snyman	Lock	Outeniqua	SWD
Alistair Hargreaves	Lock	Durban High School	Sharks
Pieter Myburgh	Flank	Paul Roos Gymnasium	Western Province
Hilton Lobberts	Flank	New Orleans	Boland
Heinrich Brüssow	Flank	Grey College	Free State Cheetahs
Deon Stegmann	Flank	Grey College	Free State Cheetahs
Ashley Johnson	Number 8	Paarl Gimnasium	Western Province
Alastair Siegelaar	Scrum-half	Paul Roos Gymnasium	Western Province
Marlon Lewis	Scrum-half	Bertram	Eastern Province
François Steyn	Fly-half	Grey College	Free State Cheetahs
Ricardo Croy	Fly-half	Paarl Gimnasium	Western Province
Herman Pretorius	Centre	Grey College	Free State Cheetahs
Brad Barritt	Centre	Kearsney College	Sharks
Jerome Williams	Wing	Middelande	Eastern Province
Randall April	Wing	Bergrivier	Boland
Luvuyo Mhlobiso	Wing	HTS Daniel Pienaar	Eastern Province
Andisa Gqoba	Wing	Hudson Park	Border
Shandre Frolick	Fullback	Worcester Gim	Boland

2003 SA Schools squad
Name	Position	School	Union
Gert Greyling	Prop	Sand du Plessis High School	Free State Cheetahs
Sangoni Mxoli	Prop	Durban High School	Sharks
Steph Roberts	Prop	Grey College	Free State Cheetahs
Adriaan Strauss	Hooker	Grey College	Free State Cheetahs
Chilliboy Ralepelle	Hooker	Pretoria Boys	Blue Bulls
Antoine Gronum	Lock	Oakdale	SWD
Wilhelm Steenkamp	Lock	HJS Paarl	Western Province
Flip van der Merwe	Lock	Grey College	Free State Cheetahs
Leon Karemaker	Flank	Belville	Western Province
Mtobeli Ngonyoza	Flank	Oscar Mpetha	Western Province
Richardt Strauss	Flank	Grey College	Free State Cheetahs
Pieter Louw	Number 8	HJS Paarl	Western Province
Warren Malgas	Scrum-half	PW Botha	SWD
Jano Vermaak	Scrum-half	Vereeniging	Falcons
Jody Rose	Fly-half	Paul Roos Gymnasium	Western Province
Ncedo Koyana	Centre	Selborne College	Border
Ashwin Scott	Centre	Parkdene	SWD
Pieter Spamer	Centre	Pietersburg	Limpopo Blue Bulls
Andisa Gqoba	Wing	Hudson Park	Border
Frank Wagenstroom	Wing	Tygerberg	Western Province
Marius Delport	Wing	Zwartkop	Blue Bulls
Alwyn Hollenbach	Fullback	Grey College	Free State Cheetahs

2002 SA Schools squad
Name	Position	School	Union
Schalk Ferreira	Prop	Paul Roos Gymnasium	Western Province
Brandon Squires	Prop	Maritzburg College	Sharks
Riaan Vermeulen	Prop	Grey College	Free State Cheetahs
Chiliboy Ralepelle	Hooker	Pretoria Boys	Blue Bulls
Bismarck du Plessis	Hooker	Grey College	Free State Cheetahs
Wilhelm de Jager	Lock	Ermelo	Pumas
Jaydon Hill	Lock	Glenwood	Sharks
Cliff Milton	Lock	Affies	Blue Bulls
Derick Kuun	Flank	Affies	Blue Bulls
Steven Ellis	Flank	Westridge High Johannesburg	Lions
Martin Sithole	Flank	Embalenthele	Pumas
Wium Arlow	Number 8	Nelspruit	Pumas
Ruan Pienaar	Scrum-half	Grey College	Free State Cheetahs
Paul Delport	Scrum-half	SACS	Western Province
Peter Grant	Fly-half	Maritzburg College	Sharks
Thembani Mkokeli	Fly-half	Msobomvu	Border
Adrian Penzhorn	Centre	Maritzburg College	Sharks
Earl Rose	Centre	Strand	Western Province
Onke Poni	Centre	Selborne College	Border
Enwill Alexander	Wing	Stellenberg	Western Province
Luvo Sogidashe	Wing	Kama	Border
Hennie Daniller	Fullback	Paarl Gimnasium	Western Province

2001 SA Schools squad
Name	Position	School	Union
Albertus Buckle	Prop	Boland Landbou	Boland
Petros Methula	Prop	Glenwood	Sharks
Pieter Pienaar	Prop	HJS Paarl	Western Province
Morne Kruger	Hooker	Monument	Golden Lions
Bismarck du Plessis	Hooker	Grey College	Free State Cheetahs
Michael de Bruin	Lock	Hoërskool Nelspruit	Pumas
Cliff Milton	Lock	Affies	Blue Bulls
Callie Wannenburg	Flank	Oakdale	SWD
Luke Watson	Flank	Grey High	Eastern Province
Martin Sithole	Flank	Embalenthele	Pumas
Jan-Hendrik Joubert	Number 8	Oakdale	SWD
Johan van der Schyff	Number 8	Monument	Golden Lions
Divan Jacobs	Scrum-half	Ermelo	Pumas
Paul Delport	Scrum-half	SACS	Western Province
Derick Hougaard	Fly-half	Boland Landbou	Boland
Thembani Mkokeli	Fly-half	Msobomvu	Border
David Edgar	Centre	Michaelhouse	Sharks
Deon Venter	Centre	Affies	Blue Bulls
Steven Farmer	Wing	Kasselsvlei	Western Province
Devan Michaels	Wing	Kasselsvlei	Western Province
Jeremy Plaatjies	Wing	Outeniqua	SWD
Greg Goosen	Fullback	Kearsney College	Sharks

2000 SA Schools squad
Name	Position	School	Union
Neil Fullard	Prop	HJS Paarl	Western Province
JD Moller	Prop	HJS Paarl	Western Province
Wian du Preez	Prop	Grey College	Free State Cheetahs
Greyling Erasmus	Hooker	Ermelo	Pumas
Dean Hopp	Hooker	Kairos	SWD
Ross Skeate	Lock	SACS	Western Province
Willie Steenkamp	Lock	Grey College	Free State Cheetahs
Roedolf van der Westhuizen	Lock	Affies	Blue Bulls
Marthinus Ferreira	Flank	Florida	Golden Lions
Tshipiso Vundla	Flank	St Albans	Blue Bulls
Kaunda Ntunja	Flank	Dale College	Border
Jacques Cronjé	Number 8	John Vorster	Blue Bulls
Stefan Basson	Scrum-half	Boland Landbou	Western Province
Ricky Januarie	Scrum-half	Weston	Boland
Nel Fourie	Fly-half	Ermelo	Pumas
Paul Roux	Centre	Paul Roos Gymnasium	Western Province
Dewey Swartbooi	Centre	Worcester Gim	Boland
Ashlyn Hearne	Centre	Hottentots Holland	Western Province
Francois Barnies	Wing	Parow	Western Province
Jeremy Plaatjies	Wing	Outeniqua	SWD
Sydwhill Neethling	Wing	Worcester Gim	Boland
Colin Radebe	Fullback	Secunda	Pumas
MJ Mentz	Fullback	Ermelo	Pumas

1999 SA Schools squad
Name	Position	School	Union
Lonwaba Mtimka	Prop	Dale College	Border
Wian du Preez	Prop	Grey College	Free State Cheetahs
Kobus Caldo	Prop	Oakdale	SWD
Kobus van der Walt	Hooker	Affies	Blue Bulls
Schalk Brits	Hooker	Paul Roos Gymnasium	Western Province
John Brown	Lock	Hentie Cilliers	Griffons
Jaco du Toit	Lock	Paarl Gimnasium	Western Province
Alten Hulme	Lock	Voortrekker (CPT)	Western Province
Vuyani Forslara	Flank	Grens	Border
Kaunda Ntunja	Flank	Dale College	Border
Gary Botha	Flank	Overkruin	Blue Bulls
Pedrie Wannenburg	Number 8	Oakdale	SWD
Rudi Dames	Scrum-half	Vereeniging	Falcons
Sean Fortuin	Scrum-half	Belville South	Western Province
Gordon Johnston	Scrum-half	HJS Paarl	Western Province
Sean Flanagan	Fly-half	Westville	Sharks
Clyde Rathbone	Centre	Kingsway	Sharks
Jean de Villiers	Centre	HJS Paarl	Western Province
Ricardo Pietersen	Wing	Groot Brak	SWD
Daniel Mahlangu	Wing	Oosterland	Pumas
Jorrie Muller	Fullback	Monument	Golden Lions
Neil Arends	Fullback	McCarthy Uitenhage	Eastern Province

1998 SA Schools Academy squad
Name	Position	School	Union
Nicol Knoetze	Prop	Affies	Blue Bulls
Guthro Steenkamp	Prop	Paarl Boys High	Western Province
Hein van Rensburg	Prop	Monument	Golden Lions
Deon van der Westhuizen	Prop	UNKNOWN	SARSA Academy
Leo Strydom	Hooker	Newlands East Secondary High	Sharks
Louis du Preez	Hooker	UNKNOWN	Golden Lions
Barend Pieterse	Lock	Waterkloof	Blue Bulls
Vuyani Foslara	Flank	Grens High	Border
Jaco Botha	Flank	Rhodesfield High	Falcons
Petrus Sambo	Flank	Stifakotile Secondary	Pumas
Phillip van Schalkwyk	Number 8	Paul Roos Gimnasium	Pumas
Ashieq Wise	Scrum-half	SACS	WP
Ryan O'Ryan	Scrum-half	UNKNOWN	SARSA Academy
Herkie Kruger	Fly-half	Michaelhouse	KZN
Daniel Philander	Fly-half	Scottsville Senior Secondary	WP
Kevin Williams	Fly-half	Weltevrede Senior Secondary	Boland
Manfred Kali	Centre	KES	Golden Lions
Armand Blignaut	Centre	Monument	Golden Lions
Derek van Zyl	Wing	Graaff Reinet	EP
Peter Gibson	Fullback	Selborne College	Border
Dries van den Heever	UNKNOWN	UNKNOWN	Blue Bulls

1998 SA Schools squad
Name	Position	School	Union
Renier Meyer	Prop	Wessel Maree	Griffons
CJ van der Linde	Prop	Grey College	Free State Cheetahs
Kobus Caldo	Prop	Oakdale	SWD
Manfred Bohmer	Hooker	Ermelo	Pumas
Wimpie Botha	Hooker	Queens College	Border
Bakkies Botha	Lock	Veereniging	Falcons
Wayne van Heerden	Lock	Brandwag	Eastern Province
Angus Martyn	Flank	Michaelhouse	Sharks
Gary Botha	Flank	Overkruin	Blue Bulls
Nico Breedt	Number 8	Kearsney College	Sharks
Joe van Niekerk	Number 8	KES	Golden Lions
John Cooper	Scrum-half	Soa Bras Mossel Bay	SWD
Robbie Janse van Rensburg	Scrum-half	Affies	Blue Bulls
Tiaan Snyman	Fly-half	Affies	Blue Bulls
Johan Oberholzer	Centre	Vereeniging	Falcons
Bradley Sparks	Centre	Selborne College	Border
Adrian Jacobs	Centre	Scottsville	Western Province
Nicholas Johnson	Wing	Selborne College	Border
Kadima Kalonji	Wing	Pretoria THS	Blue Bulls
Izak Job	Fullback	President Steyn	Free State Cheetahs
David Manuel	Fullback	Waterkloof	Blue Bulls

1997 SA Schools Academy squad
Name	Position	School	Union
Lawrence Sephaka	Prop	HTS Springs	Falcons
L. Wessels	Prop	UNKNOWN	Leopards
Daniel du Preez	Hooker	UNKNOWN	Leopards
Brian Christians	Lock	Promoso	Leopards
C. Barnard	Lock	UNKNOWN	Lions
Ettienne Barnard	Flank	HTS Vereeniging	Falcons
Gcobani Bobo	Flank	Rondebosch Boys High	Western Province
Wikus van Heerden	Flank	Waterkloof	Blue Bulls
Theo Erasmus	Number 8	Affies	Blue Bulls
Matt Botha	Scrum-half	Maritzburg College	Sharks
Manfred Kali	Fly-half	King Edward VII School, Johannesburg	Lions
T. Booysen	Centre	UNKNOWN	Western Province
Wayne Julies	Centre	Charleston Hill	Boland
Morne van Tonder	Wing	Gill College	Eastern Province
Fabian Juries	Wing	Kingswood College	Eastern Province
Isak Job	Fullback	President Steyn	Free State Cheetahs
Brendon Johnson	UNKNOWN	UNKNOWN	Eastern Province
J. Tuiters	UNKNOWN	UNKNOWN	SWD
A. van der Westhuizen	UNKNOWN	UNKNOWN	Blue Bulls
E. McKenzie	UNKNOWN	UNKNOWN	Western Province
J. Butler	UNKNOWN	UNKNOWN	Lions

1997 SA Schools squad
Name	Position	School	Union
Virgulle Steenkamp	Prop	Excelsior	Western Province
Eduard Coetzee	Prop	Affies	Blue Bulls
Deon Carstens	Prop	Boland Landbou	Western Province
Corrie Steenkamp	Hooker	Veereniging	Falcons
James van der Walt	Hooker	Ermelo	Pumas
Rob Linde	Lock	Maritzburg College	Sharks
Niel Goosen	Lock	Hoërskool Waterkloof	Blue Bulls
Wayne van Heerden	Lock	Brandwag (EC)	Eastern Province
Hendro Scholtz	Flank	Voortrekker (Beth)	Griffons
Chris le Roux	Flank	Hoërskool Waterkloof	Blue Bulls
Joe van Niekerk	Number 8	KES	Golden Lions
Falie Oelschig	Scrum-half	Grey College	Free State Cheetahs
Bolla Conradie	Scrum-half	Kasselsvlei	Western Province
Tiaan Snyman	Fly-half	Affies	Blue Bulls
Ettienne Botha	Centre	John Vorster	Falcons
Barry McDonald	Centre	Adelaide Gim	Border
Willem-Petrus van Zyl	Wing	HJS Paarl	Western Province
Friedrich Lombard	Wing	Frankfort	Free State Cheetahs
Conrad Jantjes	Wing	CBS Boksburg	Falcons
Altus Meyer	Fullback	Vredenburg	Boland
David Manuel	Fullback	Hoërskool Waterkloof	Blue Bulls
Jan-Harm Hugo	Fullback	Ermelo	Pumas

1996 SA Schools Academy squad
Name	Position	School	Union
Dekado Jantjies	Prop	Asherville	Eastern Province
Pietman van Niekerk	Prop	Potchefstroom Gimnasium	Leopards
M. Cussakwe	Prop	UNKNOWN	Eastern Province
Hanyani Shimange	Hooker	Rondebosch Boys High School	Western Province
D. du Preez	Hooker	UNKNOWN	Leopards
Daniel van Wyk	Lock	HTS Middelburg	Pumas
J. Bezuidenhout	Lock	Pretoria-Wes	Blue Bulls
Jean Peters	Flank	Afrikaans High, Germiston	Lions
C. Taljaard	Flank	UNKNOWN	Western Province
Roland Reid	Number 8	HTS Springs	Falcons
Arno Killian	Number 8	Waterkloof	Blue Bulls
Mark Swartland	Scrum-half	Hermanus High School	Western Province
Kholikele Ralo	Scrum-half	Thubalethu High School	Eastern Province
Morne Loxton	Fly-half	David Livingstone	Eastern Province
Christo Potgieter	Centre	Affies	Blue Bulls
Wayne Julies	Centre	Charleston Hill	Boland
John Camp	Wing	Maritzburg College	Sharks
Ferdi Wesso	Wing	President Steyn	Free State Cheetahs
Malan du Plessis	Fullback	Hoerskool Oosterland	Pumas

1996 SA Schools squad
Name	Position	School	Union
Jacques Coetzer	Prop	HTS Middleburg	Pumas
Richard Kelly	Prop	Maritzburg College	Sharks
John Smit	Prop	Pretoria Boys	Blue Bulls
Stefaan Myburgh	Hooker	Paul Roos Gymnasium	Western Province
Corrie Steenkamp	Hooker	HTS Vereeniging	Falcons
Jaco Myburgh	Lock	HJS Paarl	Western Province
Christo Pretorius	Lock	Paarl Gimnasium	Western Province
Sean Plaatjies	Flank	Brandwag (EC)	Eastern Province
Gcobani Bobo	Flank	Dale College	Border
Chris le Roux	Flank	Hoërskool Waterkloof	Blue Bulls
Shaun Sowerby	Number 8	Sasolburg	Vaal Triangle
Greyling Weideman	Scrum-half	HTS Drostdy	Boland
Bolla Conradie	Scrum-half	Kasselsvlei	Western Province
Jaco van der Westhuyzen	Fly-half	Ben Viljoen	Pumas
Kobus Kruger	Centre	HTS Middleburg	Pumas
Barry McDonald	Centre	Adelaide Gim	Border
Mike Marais	Centre	Hoërskool Waterkloof	Blue Bulls
Jason de Kock	Wing	Hugenote	Falcons
Nicolaas Alberts	Wing	Affies	Blue Bulls
Jeffrey Stevens	Wing	Breerivier	Boland
Rodrique Manuel	Fullback	Ben Heights	Western Province
Jan Cloete	Fullback	Wonderboom	Blue Bulls

1995 SA Schools Academy squad
Name	Position	School	Union
Dekado Jantjies	Prop	Asherville	Eastern Province
Henry Nelson	Prop	Cradock High School	Eastern Province
Gerhardus Kruger	Prop	Paul Roos Gimnasium	Western Province
Reagan Petersen	Hooker	Kasselsvlei Secondary	Western Province
Andre van Niekerk	Hooker	Vorentoe	Leopards
Victor Matfield	Lock	Pietersburg	Limpopo Blue Bulls
Morne Engelbrecht	Lock	Rustenburg	Leopards
Fernando Penshaw	Flank	Gramble Street	Eastern Province
Sean Plaatjies	Flank	Brandwag	Eastern Province
Morne Goetham	Number 8	Paulus Joubert	Boland
Aubrey Carolus	Scrum-half	Booysens Park	Eastern Province
Kholikele Ralo	Scrum-half	Thubalethu High School	Eastern Province
Wade Wingfield	Fly-half	DHS	Sharks
Selwyn September	Centre	Aeroville	Eastern Province
Andre Erasmus	Centre	Grey College	Free State Cheetahs
Juwellyn Kamfer	Centre	Waveren	Boland
Marcel de Ridder	Wing	Daniel Pienaar	Eastern Province
Fabian Juries	Wing	Mary Waters	Eastern Province
Danny Miggels	Fullback	Chapman	Eastern Province
Melvin Davids	Utility Back	Booysens Park	Eastern Province

1995 SA Schools squad
Name	Position	School	Union
Riaan Olckers	Prop	Affies	Blue Bulls
HJ Olivier	Prop	Kroonstad	Griffons
JP Basson	Prop	Boland Landbou	Western Province
Hano Dreyer	Hooker	Winterberg Agricultural	Eastern Province
Pieter Dixon	Hooker	Maritzburg College	Sharks
Chrisjan van der Westhuizen	Lock	Hoërskool Menlopark	Blue Bulls
Gerrie Theron	Lock	Rustenburg	Leopards
Jaco Barnard	Lock	Affies Kroonstad	Griffons
Hannes Cloete	Flank	Jim Fouche	Free State Cheetahs
Kobus le Roux	Flank	Boland Landbou	Western Province
Arno Killian	Number 8	Hoërskool Waterkloof	Blue Bulls
Grant Bartle	Scrum-half	HTS Middleburg	Pumas
Walter Campbell-McGeachy	Scrum-half	Pietersburg	Limpopo Blue Bulls
Patrick Peterson	Fly-half	Florida	Western Province
Sean Clancy	Centre	Selborne College	Border
Jacques Steyn	Centre	Andrew Rabie	Eastern Province
Stephen Froneman	Centre	Montana	Blue Bulls
Coenie Louw	Wing	Dirkie Uys	Boland
Jeffrey Stevens	Wing	Breerivier	Boland
Antonius Verhoeven	Fullback	Charlie Hofmeyer	Boland
Adriaan de Waal	Fullback	HJS Paarl	Western Province

1994 SA Schools squad
Name	Position	School	Union
Kenneth Fourie	Prop	Port Shepstone	Sharks
JP Basson	Prop	Boland Landbou	Western Province
Faan Rautenbach	Prop	Kroonstad Agriculture	Griffons
Delarey du Preez	Hooker	Hangklip	Border
Hottie Louw	Lock	Boland Landbou	Western Province
Gerrie Theron	Lock	Rustenburg	Leopards
Morne Engelbrecht	Lock	Rustenburg	Leopards
Bobby Skinstad	Flank	Hilton	Sharks
Hendrik Gerber	Flank	Nico Malan	Eastern Province
Joggie Viljoen	Scrum-half	Framesby	Eastern Province
Walter Campbell-McGeachy	Scrum-half	Pitersburg	Limpopo Blue Bulls
Louis Koen	Fly-half	Paarl Gimnasium	Western Province
Kosie van Vuuren	Centre	Affies Kroonstad	Griffons
Stephan le Roux	Centre	Hoërskool Waterkloof	Blue Bulls
Wayne Munn	Wing	Maritzburg College	Sharks
Nico Heunis	Fullback	Dirkie Uys	Boland
Riaan Pretorius	-	Ben Viljoen	Pumas
Jaco van Zyl	-	JG Meiring	Western Province
Brendon Whitfield	-	Selborne College	Border
Corne de Bruyn	-	Worcester Gim	Boland
Bruce de Jager	-	Bishops	Western Province
Ernest Diedrichs	-	Scottsville	Western Province

1993 SA Schools squad
Name	Position	School	Union
Faan Rautenbach	Prop	Kroonstad Agriculture	Griffons
Nicky van der Walt	Flank	Ermelo	Pumas
Corné Krige	Flank	HJS Paarl	Western Province
Hendrik Gerber	Flank	Nico Malan	Eastern Province
Clint Walters	Number 8	Potch Gim	Eastern Province
Dave von Hoesslin	Scrum-half	Bishops	Western Province
Joggie Viljoen	Scrum-half	Framesby	Eastern Province
Louis Koen	Fly-half	Paarl Gimnasium	Western Province
Chris Derksen	Fly-half	Grey College	Free State Cheetahs
Dawie du Toit	Centre	Monument	Golden Lions
Rudi Muller	Centre	Potch Gim	Leopards
Stephan Le Roux	Centre	Potch Gim	Leopards
JP van der Mescht	Wing	Daniel Pienaar	Eastern Province
Martin Willemse	Wing	Potch Gim	Leopards
Percy Montgomery	Fullback	SACS	Western Province
Ernst Hammer	-	Die Fakkel	Golden Lions
Braam Hendriks	-	Sandveld	Griffons
Werner Hugo	-	HJS Paarl	Western Province
Johan Breedt	Prop	Potch Gim	Blue Bulls
Lourens Muller	Lock	Hartebeespoort	Blue Bulls
Stephen Temple	Lock	Pretoria Boys High	Blue Bulls

1992 SA Schools squad
Name	Position	School	Union
Daniel Saayman	Prop	Daniel Pienaar	Eastern Province
Robbie Kempson	Prop	Queens College	Border
Stephan Bronkhorst	Hooker	Randburg	Golden Lions
Charl van Rensburg	Lock	Queens College	Border
Gerhard Laufs	Lock	Alberton	Golden Lions
Carl van Westing	Flank	Marais Viljoen	Golden Lions
Wimpie Bannik	Flank	Hans Strijdom	Far North
Scott Kemp	Number 8	Hudson Park	Border
Richard Bennett	Scrum-half	Dale College	Border
Herschelle Gibbs	Fly-half	Bishops	Western Province
Joe Gillingham	Centre	Alberton	Golden Lions
Dawie du Toit	Centre	Monument	Golden Lions
Albertus van Buuren	Centre	Hoopstad	Griffons
Stephen Brink	Wing	Sentraal	Free State Cheetahs
JR Oosthuizen	Wing	Grey College	Free State Cheetahs
Percy Montgomery	Fullback	SACS	Western Province

1991 SA Schools squad
Name	Position	School	Union
Ollie le Roux	Prop	Grey College	Free State Cheetahs
Jan Bosch	Hooker	Helpmekaar Kollege	Golden Lions
Stephen Hall	Lock	Dale College	Border
Piet Krause	Flank	Sasolburg	Vaal Triangle
Scott Kemp	Number 8	Hudson Park	Border
Chad Alcock	Scrum-half	Alexander Road	Eastern Province
Werner Swanepoel	Scrum-half	Grey College	Free State Cheetahs
Greg Miller	Fly-half	Grey High	Eastern Province
Bennie Botes	Fly-half	Affies	Blue Bulls
Andre Venter	Centre	Grey College	Free State Cheetahs
Stephen Brink	Wing	Sentraal	Free State Cheetahs
Alex Fenwick	Wing	Grey College	Free State Cheetahs
Justin Swart	Fullback	Paul Roos Gymnasium	Western Province
Hugo Venter	Fullback	Grey College	Free State Cheetahs
Brett Barrett	-	Kingswood	Eastern Province
Norman Cilliers	-	Ermelo	Pumas
Barabas Koen	-	Ermelo	Pumas
Daniel McAllister	-	Selborne College	Border
Willem Saaiman	-	Hoërskool Menlopark	Blue Bulls

1990 SA Schools squad
Name	Position	School	Union
Os du Randt	Prop	Piet Retief	NEC
Nico Linde	Prop	Grey College	Free State Cheetahs
Etienne Fynn	Prop	Sharks	
Basil de Koning	Hooker	Kingswood	Eastern Province
Braam Els	Lock	Affies Kroonstad	Griffons
Dion O'Cuinneagain	Flank	Rondebosch	Western Province
Jean Craven	Flank	Grey College	Free State Cheetahs
Jacques Grobler	Scrum-half	FH Odendaal	Blue Bulls
Chris Beukes	Fly-half	Durban High School	Sharks
Pieta Steenkamp	Centre	Grey College	Free State Cheetahs
Andre Venter	Centre	Grey College	Free State Cheetahs
Frank Goedeke	Wing	Carter	Sharks
Alex Fenwick	Wing	Grey College	Free State Cheetahs
Andries Fourie	Fullback	Framesby	Eastern Province
Arno Dames	-	Framesby	Eastern Province

1989 SA Schools squad
Name	Position	School	Union
Clinton Meyer	Prop	Maritzburg College	Sharks
Mark McIntyre	Prop	Grey College	Free State Cheetahs
Tank Lanning	Prop	Bishops	Western Province
Luther Bakkes	Flank	Diamantveld	Griquas
Dion O'Cuinneagain	Flank	Rondebosch	Western Province
Naka Drotske	Flank	Grey College	Free State Cheetahs
Marais Bushney	Scrum-half	Roodepoort	Golden Lions
Pieter O'Neill	Fly-half	Despatch	Eastern Province
Bertus Kruger	Fly-half	Die Burger	Golden Lions
Anton Jankowitz	Centre	Hilton	Sharks
Jaco Taute	Centre	Klerksdorp	Leopards
Andre Venter	Centre	Monument	Golden Lions
Michael Ehrentraut	Fullback	Bishops	Western Province
Danie van der Walt	Fullback	Ermelo	Pumas
Andrew North	-	Bishops	Western Province
Michael Richardson	-	Despatch	Eastern Province
Paul Searson	-	Bishops	Western Province
Jacques Stevenson	-	Ermelo	Pumas
Ian de Ru	-	Marais Viljoen	Golden Lions

1988 SA Schools squad
Name	Position	School	Union
Mornay Visser	Hooker	Paarl Gimnasium	Western Province
Ruben Kruger	Flank	Grey College	Free State Cheetahs
Cornel Wiese	Flank	Paarl Gimnasium	Western Province
Kosie Menz	Scrum-half	Paarl Gimnasium	Western Province
Pieter O'Neill	Fly-half	Despatch	Eastern Province
Pieter Hendriks	Wing	Standerton	Pumas
Pieter Muller	Fullback	Grey College	Free State Cheetahs
Andrew Claasen	-	Andrew Rabie	Eastern Province
Jaco Coetzee	-	Ellisras	Far North
Lee Feurer	-	Bishops	Western Province
Jaco Gericke	-	Port Elizabeth THS	Eastern Province
Merrick Heuer	-	Queens College	Border
Andre Hough	-	Framesby	Eastern Province
Dawie Senekal	-	Abbots	Western Province
Hakkies Swart	-	Drostdy	Boland
Clayton Wait	-	Pearson	Eastern Province
Deon Wiggins	-	Hugenote	Boland
Jan-Hendrik Barnard	-	Menlopark	Blue Bulls

1987 SA Schools squad
Name	Position	School	Union
Grant Reid	Prop	Maritzburg College	Sharks
Pierre du Plessis	Hooker	Voortrekker PMB	Sharks
Brendan Cattrell	Lock	Maritzburg College	Sharks
Warren Wilson	Flank	Maritzburg College	Sharks
Ruben Kruger	Flank	Grey College	Free State Cheetahs
Chris Rossouw	Flank	Hugenote	Falcons
Udo Goedeke	Fly-half	Maritzburg College	Sharks
Errol Stewart	Centre	Westville	Sharks
Brendan Venter	Centre	Monument	Golden Lions
Leon van Rooyen	Wing	Estcourt	Sharks
James Small	Wing	Greenside	Golden Lions
Pieter Muller	Fullback	Grey College	Free State Cheetahs
Warren Ingles	-	Alexander Road	Eastern Province
Jaco Jacobs	-	Grey College	Free State Cheetahs
Johan Nel	-	Wolmaranstad	Griffons
Jannie Theron	-	Sand du Plessis	Free State Cheetahs
Jannie Griesel	-	Verwoedburg	Blue Bulls

1986 SA Schools squad
Name	Position	School	Union
Dick Brown	Prop	Pearson	Eastern Province
Barney Cooper	Prop	Paarl Gimnasium	Western Province
Andries Truscott	Hooker	Grey College	Free State Cheetahs
Chet Maherry	Lock	Grey College	Free State Cheetahs
Ernest van Niekerk	Number 8	Paarl Gimnasium	Western Province
Craig Richardson	Scrum-half	Despatch	Eastern Province
Pieter de Haas	Centre	Grey College	Free State Cheetahs
FA Meiring	Centre	Gill College	NEC
Jeremy Thomson	Centre	Maritzburg College	Sharks
Buks Steenkamp	Centre	Grey College	Free State Cheetahs
Jaco Swanepoel	Wing	Grey College	Free State Cheetahs
Christo Liebenberg	Fullback	Roodepoort	Golden Lions
Frankel Engelbrecht	-	Paarl Gimnasium	Western Province
Dawie Naude	-	David Roos	NEC
Shaun Palmer	-	HTS Middleburg	Pumas
Francois Rossouw	-	Middleburg	Pumas
JC Engelbrecht	-	Paul Roos Gymnasium	Western Province

1985 SA Schools squad
Name	Position	School	Union
Neil Zaltsman	Prop	Northlands	Sharks
Connie Campher	Prop	Potchefstroom	Leopards
Shaun Gage	Hooker	Durban High School	Sharks
Chet Maherry	Lock	Grey College	Free State Cheetahs
Francois Pienaar	Flank	Patriot Witbank	Pumas
Jaco Espag	Flank	Witbank	Pumas
Frans Cronje	Number 8	Grey College	Free State Cheetahs
Shaun Glover	Scrum-half	Maritzburg College	Sharks
Dennis Baronet	Centre	Glenwood	Sharks
Buks Steenkamp	Centre	Grey College	Free State Cheetahs
Chris Davel	-	Ermelo	Pumas
Johan du Plessis	-	Sand du Plessis	Free State Cheetahs
Fransie Du Preez	-	EG Jansen	Golden Lions
Andre Hickson	-	Bosmansdam	Western Province
Jeremy Reingold	Centre	Constantia	Western Province
Niekie van Niekerk	-	De Wet Nel	Griffons
JC Engelbrecht	-	Paul Roos Gymnasium	Western Province

1984 SA Schools squad
Name	Position	School	Union
Paul de Nobrega	Prop	Worcester Gim	Boland
Gielie Swiegers	Prop	Monument	Golden Lions
Craig Coyle-Meyberry	Prop	Dale College	Border
Jaco Espag	Flank	Witbank	Pumas
Gray Thomas	Number 8	Potch Volkskool	Leopards
Stompie Fourie	Scrum-half	Grey College	Free State Cheetahs
Joel Stransky	Fly-half	Maritzburg College	Sharks
Gary Loest	Centre	Queens College	Border
Jacques Niewenhuys	Centre	Monument	Golden Lions
Ronnie Visage	Wing	Rob Ferreira	Pumas
Riaan Beizedenhout	Fullback	Framesby	Eastern Province
Michael Carswell	-	Grey High	Eastern Province
Neil du Plessis	-	Selborne College	Border
Johannes Pretorius	-	Hentie Cilliers	Griffons
Adriaan Schickerling	-	Boland Landbou	Western Province
Deon Schurmann	-	Eldoraigne	Blue Bulls

1983 SA Schools squad
Name	Position	School	Union
Balie Swart	Prop	Paarl Gimnasium	Western Province
Craig Coyle-Meyberry	Prop	Dale College	Border
Gert Marais	Prop	Grey College	Free State Cheetahs
Kees Stevens	Hooker	Grey College	Free State Cheetahs
Kalf Giezing	Lock	Grey College	Free State Cheetahs
Altus Burger	Lock	Ermelo	Pumas
Fanus Engelbrecht	Flank	Rob Ferreira	Pumas
Peter Kuttel	Flank	Bishops	Western Province
Jaco van der Merwe	Number 8	Bishops	Western Province
Rodney van Vurren	Scrum-half	Affies Kroonstad	Griffons
Hans Scriba	Fly-half	Outeniqua	SWD
Eben Scheepers	Centre	Grey College	Free State Cheetahs
Ronnie Visage	Wing	Rob Ferreira	Pumas
Pieter Nel	Wing	Patriot Witbank	Pumas
Gielie Vermeulen	Fullback	Paul Roos Gymnasium	Western Province

1982 SA Schools squad
Name	Position	School	Union
Altus Burger	Lock	Ermelo	Pumas
Wikus van Heerden	Flank	Voortrekkerhoogte	Blue Bulls
Jacques Visser	Scrum-half	Paarl Gimnasium	Western Province
Helgard Müller	Centre	Grey College	Free State Cheetahs
Johan Swart	Centre	Paarl Gimnasium	Western Province
Frederick Knoetze	Wing	Framesby	Eastern Province
Jannie Coetzee	-	Louis Botha	Free State Cheetahs
Braam Duvenhage	-	Hugenote	Falcons
Kerneels Erasmus	-	Frikkie Meyer	Far North
Johan Heydenrich	-	Standerton	Pumas
Leon Nel	-	Nelspruit	Pumas
Lourens Oberholzer	-	Linden	Golden Lions
Wilhelm Joubert	-	Overkruin	Blue Bulls
Coenie Willemse	-	Hendrik Verwoed	Blue Bulls
Jan Wolmarans	-	Wonderboom	Blue Bulls

1981 SA Schools squad
Name	Position	School	Union
Wessel Lightfoot	Hooker	Diamantveld	Griquas
Wahl Bartmann	Flank	Hoërskool Florida	Golden Lions
Conrad de Beer	Scrum-half	Grey College	Free State Cheetahs
Scheepers Gouws	Fly-half	Grey College	Free State Cheetahs
Andre Greyling	Centre	Grey College	Free State Cheetahs
Helgard Muller	Centre	Grey College	Free State Cheetahs
Kobus Burger	Wing	Paarl Gimnasium	Western Province
Leon Botha	Wing	Grey College	Free State Cheetahs
Gerbrand Grobler	Fullback	Grey College	Free State Cheetahs
Kierie Barnard	-	Potch Volkskool	Leopards
Andries Engelbrecht	-	Potch Volkskool	Leopards
Lukas Grobler	-	Hugenote	Falcons
Stephan van Coller	-	Potch Volkskool	Leopards
CP van der Walt	-	Piet Potgieter	Far North
Nico van Rooyen	-	Rustenburg	Leopards
Robert Walker	-	St Johns	Golden Lions

1980 SA Schools squad
Name	Position	School	Union
Danie Theron	Prop	Kimberly Boys	Griquas
Kevin Kaplan	Prop	Kimberly Boys	Griquas
Joepie van der Merwe	Hooker	Grey College	Free State Cheetahs
Hendrik Daffue	Lock	Grey College	Free State Cheetahs
Kolie van Genderen	Lock	Monument	Golden Lions
Boeta Nel	Lock	Louis Botha	Free State Cheetahs
Koen Pieterse	Flank	Grey College	Free State Cheetahs
Hennie Jordaan	Flank	Menlopark	Blue Bulls
Jurie Erwee	Flank	Grey College	Free State Cheetahs
Bennie van der Merwe	Number 8	HJS Paarl	Western Province
Freddie Ferreira	Scrum-half	Brandwag (EP)	Eastern Province
Chris Kasselman	Fly-half	Sandveld	Griffons
Conrad de Beer	Fly-half	Grey College	Free State Cheetahs
Danie van der Merwe	Centre	Mariental	Namibia
Gert Viljoen	Centre	De Wet Nel	Griffons
Jaco Reinach	Wing	Grey College	Free State Cheetahs
Kobus Burger	Wing	Paarl Gimnasium	Western Province
Hugo Slabbert	Fullback	Potch Gim	Leopards
Pieter Sonnekus	-	Louis Botha	Free State Cheetahs

1979 SA Schools squad
Name	Position	School	Union
Clifford Hopkins	Prop	Kearsney College	Sharks
Karel Erlank	Prop	Klerksdorp	Leopards
Joepie van der Merwe	Hooker	Grey College	Free State Cheetahs
Calla Botha	Lock	DF Malan	Golden Lions
Boeta Nel	Lock	Louis Botha	Free State Cheetahs
Derek La Marque	Flank	Glenwood	Sharks
Ian Sadie	Flank	Grey College	Free State Cheetahs
Bennie van der Merwe	Number 8	HJS Paarl	Western Province
Craig Jamieson	Scrum-half	Maritzburg College	Sharks
Chris Kasselman	Fly-half	Sandveld	Griffons
Deon Coetzee	Centre	Helpmekaar Kollege	Golden Lions
Dawie Fourie	Centre	Kroonstad Agriculture	Griffons
Jaco Reinach	Wing	Grey College	Free State Cheetahs
Herman Venske	Wing	Vanderbijlpark	Golden Lions
Flippie Pretorius	Fullback	De Wet Nel	Griffons
Chris Smit	Fullback	Grey College	Free State Cheetahs

1978 SA Schools squad
Name	Position	School	Union
David Mills	Prop	Maritzburg College	Sharks
Jan van Genderen	Lock	Monument	Golden Lions
Michael Barker	Flank	Durban High School	Sharks
Robert Blignaut	Flank	Muir	Eastern Province
Christo Ferreira	Scrum-half	Welkom Gim	Griffons
Riaan Joubert	Centre	Grey College	Free State Cheetahs
Carel du Plessis	Wing	HJS Paarl	Western Province
Charl du Plessis	Fullback	Kroonstad Agriculture	Griffons
Chris Klopper	-	Die Burger	Golden Lions
Heindrich Kok	-	Rustenburg	Leopards
Pikkie van der Merwe	-	Helpmekaar Kollege	Golden Lions
Dawie Fourie	-	Kroonstad Agriculture	Griffons
Severin Anderson	-	Westering	Eastern Province
Leon Bartmann	-	Florida	Golden Lions
Mark Burton-Moore	-	Bishops	Western Province
Christo Kotze	-	Dirkie Uys	Boland

1977 SA Schools squad
Name	Position	School	Union
Paul Lindsay	Prop	Maritzburg College	Sharks
Abries Marais	Prop	Grey College	Free State Cheetahs
Christo Kotze	Hooker	Dirkie Uys	Boland
Gerhard Human	Lock	Despatch	Eastern Province
Michael Prinsloo	Lock	Fiksburg	Griffons
Willem Dafue	Flank	Grey College	Free State Cheetahs
Robert Blignaut	Flank	Muir	Eastern Province
Jan Serfontein	Number 8	Otto du Plessis	Eastern Province
Harry Viljoen	Scrum-half	Florida	Golden Lions
Johan Rossouw	Fly-half	Durbanville	Western Province
Danie Gerber	Centre	Despatch	Eastern Province
Jamie Genis	Centre	DF Malan	Western Province
Tino Kankowski	Wing	PJ Olivier	Eastern Province
Jan Richter	Wing	Grey College	Free State Cheetahs
Jacques Nell	Fullback	Grey College	Free State Cheetahs

1976 SA Schools squad
Name	Position	School	Union
Paul Lindsay	Prop	Maritzburg College	Sharks
Toppie Richter	Prop	Grey College	Free State Cheetahs
Emil-Jan Strydom	Hooker	Grey College	Free State Cheetahs
De Villiers Strydom	Lock	Voortrekker (CPT)	Western Province
Wynand Pretorius	Lock	Sand du Plessis	Free State Cheetahs
Willie Oosthuizen	Flank	Helpmekaar Kollege	Golden Lions
Gert van der Merwe	Flank	DF Malan	Western Province
Jan Serfontein	Number 8	Otto du Plessis	Eastern Province
Harry Viljoen	Scrum-half	Florida	Golden Lions
Cobus van Wyk	Fly-half	Schoonspruit	Leopards
Danie Gerber	Centre	Despatch	Eastern Province
David Smith	Centre	Hamilton	Zimbabwe
Pieter Loubser	Wing	Bishops	Western Province
Danie Nortje	Wing	Jan Viljoen	Golden Lions
Richard van der Westhuizen	Wing	Vryburger	Golden Lions
Christo Steyn	Fullback	Louis Botha	Free State Cheetahs

1975 SA Schools squad
Name	Position	School	Union
Paul Lindsay	Prop	Maritzburg College	Sharks
Anton Els	Prop	Otto du Plessis	Eastern Province
Frans van Heerden	Prop	Langenhoven	Blue Bulls
Lallie van der Linden	Prop	Pretoria North	Blue Bulls
Pieter Theron	Prop	Grey College	Free State Cheetahs
Kobie Fenwick	Hooker	Grey College	Free State Cheetahs
Barry Schoeman	Lock	Verwoedburg	Blue Bulls
Wynand Pretorius	Lock	Sand du Plessis	Free State Cheetahs
Malcolm Thompson	Flank	Maritzburg College	Sharks
Phillip Smith	Flank	Hangklip	Border
Jamie Prinsloo	Flank	John Vorster	Blue Bulls
Andries Pienaar	Number 8	HJS Paarl	Western Province
Wim Hancke	Scrum-half	Linden	Golden Lions
Anton Le Grange	Fly-half	Despatch	Eastern Province
Danie Gerber	Centre	Despatch	Eastern Province
David Smith	Centre	Hamilton	Zimbabwe
Rockey Rich	Wing	Kearsney College	Sharks
Christo Fitchet	Wing	Kirkwood	Eastern Province
Pieter Loubser	Wing	Bishops	Western Province

1974 SA Schools squad
Name	Position	School	Union
Bruce White	Prop	Maritzburg College	Sharks
Deon Visage	Prop	Potchefstroom	Leopards
Daan Roux	Prop	Lichtenburg	Griffons
Rob Hankinson	Hooker	Michaelhouse	Sharks
Ockert Stoop	Hooker	John Vorster	Falcons
Shane Carty	Lock	KES	Golden Lions
Jan Geldenhuys	Lock	Grey College	Free State Cheetahs
Bernard Pienaar	Lock	Paarl Gimnasium	Western Province
George Rautenbach	Lock	Paul Roos Gymnasium	Western Province
Andre du Preez	Flank	Oudtshoorn	SWD
Mark Kleineberg	Flank	Selborne College	Border
Nick Mallett	Flank	St Andrews (EC)	Eastern Province
Ernst Kruger	Number 8	Jeugland	Golden Lions
Dawie du Toit	Scrum-half	Vereeniging	Golden Lions
Michael Laubsher	Scrum-half	Tygerberg	Western Province
Lee Barnard	Fly-half	KES	Golden Lions
Robert Bolus	Centre	Bishops	Western Province
Fanie Campher	Centre	Wolmaransstad	Griffons
Mark Cawood	Centre	Wynberg Boys	Western Province
Agie Koch	Wing	Paul Roos Gymnasium	Western Province
Warren Kruger	Wing	SACS	Western Province
Gerhard Weitz	Wing	Grey College	Free State Cheetahs
John Bonthuys	Fullback	Abbots	Western Province
John Matthysen	-	Sand du Plessis	Free State Cheetahs

== See also ==
- South Africa national under-18 rugby union team
