= Christian Stewart =

Canada & South Africa international rugby union player

- Born: Jan Christian Stewart; 17 October 1965 (age 61) Toronto, Ontario, Canada
- Height: 183 cm (6 ft 0 in)
- Weight: 93.5 kg (14 st 10 lb)
- School: Woodridge College
- University: Stellenbosch University

Rugby union career
- Position(s): Centre, Fullback, Flyhalf
Amateur team(s)
| Years | Team | Apps | (Points) |
| 1987–1988 | Maties | | |
| 1989– | Villagers | | |
Senior career
| Years | Team | Apps | (Points) |
- Rovigo
Provincial / State sides
| Years | Team | Apps | (Points) |
| 1987–1998 | Western Province | 136 | |
Super Rugby
| Years | Team | Apps | (Points) |
| 1998 | Stormers | 9 | |
International career
| Years | Team | Apps | (Points) |
| 1991–1995 | Canada | 14 | (10) |
| 1998 | South Africa | 3 | (0) |

Jan Christian Stewart (born October 17, 1965) is a former rugby union centre, who played internationally for Canada and the South Africa Springboks. Stewart earned 17 caps, 15 with Canada and 2 for South Africa.

== Career ==
Stewart matriculated at Woodridge College in the Eastern Cape and in 1987 he enrolled at the University of Stellenbosch. He made his senior provincial debut for Western Province in 1987 as a fullback and in 1988 he was selected at centre for Western Province, forming a very successful partnership with Faffa Knoetze. In 1989 he joined Villagers, within the Western Province club system. At the end of his career with Western Province in 1998, he played 136 games for the province and scored 31 tries.

Having dual nationality, Stewart represented Canada in two rugby world cups in 1991 and in 1995 when he was not eligible for selection for the Springboks of South Africa. He played four world cup matches in 1991 and three in 1995.

In 1998 when Christian was finally available to represent the Springboks of South Africa he was selected and played 3 test matches. Unfortunately, in his 3rd and final test (the now famous test where South Africa needed to beat England at Twickenham to break the New Zealand All Blacks world record of 17 consecutive wins), he suffered a serious neck injury which ended his rugby playing career at the age of 33. After the 1995 Rugby World Cup, Christian Stewart was named in the all time Dream Team chosen by the rugby press.

Stewart also played for the Stormers in South Africa, Rovigo in Italy and rugby league for the Sydney Bulldogs in Australia.

=== Test history ===
Canada
| No. | Opposition | Result (Can 1st) | Position | Tries | Date | Venue |
|---|---|---|---|---|---|---|
| 1. | Scotland XV | 24–19 | Centre | | 25 May 1991 | Saint John |
| 2. | United States | 34–15 | Centre | | 8 Jun 1991 | Calgary |
| 3. | Fiji | 13–3 | Centre | | 5 Oct 1991 | Stade Jean Dauger, Bayonne |
| 4. | Romania | 19–11 | Centre | | 9 Oct 1991 | Stade Ernest-Wallon, Toulouse |
| 5. | France | 13–19 | Centre | | 13 Oct 1991 | Stade Armandie, Agen |
| 6. | New Zealand | 13–29 | Centre | | 20 Oct 1991 | Stadium Lille Métropole, Villeneuve-d'Ascq |
| 7. | England | 19–60 | Centre | | 10 Dec 1994 | Twickenham, Edinburgh |
| 8. | France | 9–28 | Centre | | 17 Dec 1994 | Stade Léo Lagrange, Besançon |
| 9. | Scotland | 6–22 | Centre | | 21 Jan 1995 | Murrayfield, Edinburgh |
| 10. | Fiji | 22–10 | Centre | 1 | 8 Apr 1995 | Prince Charles Park, Nadi |
| 11. | New Zealand | 7–73 | Replacement | 1 | 22 Apr 1995 | Eden Park, Auckland |
| 12. | Romania | 34–3 | Centre | | 26 May 1995 | Boet Erasmus Stadium, Port Elizabeth |
| 13. | Australia | 11–27 | Centre | | 31 May 1995 | Boet Erasmus Stadium, Port Elizabeth |
| 14. | South Africa | 0–20 | Centre | | 3 Jun 1995 | Boet Erasmus Stadium, Port Elizabeth |
South Africa
| No. | Opposition | Result (SA 1st) | Position | Tries | Date | Venue |
| 1. | Scotland | 35–10 | Centre | | 21 Nov 1998 | Murrayfield, Edinburgh |
| 2. | Ireland | 27–13 | Centre | | 28 Nov 1998 | Lansdowne Road, Dublin |
| 3. | England | 7–13 | Centre | | 5 Dec 1998 | Twickenham, London |

== Accolades ==
In 1988, Stewart was one of the five SA Young Players of the Year, along with Kobus Burger, Jacques du Plessis, Andre Joubert and JJ van der Walt.

== See also ==
- List of Canada national rugby union players – no. 205
- List of South Africa national rugby union players – Springbok no. 642
