= Jaco Reinach =

South African rugby union player

- Born: Jacobus Reinach; 1 January 1962 Ceres, Western Cape, South Africa
- Died: 21 January 1997 (aged 35) Kroonstad, Free State
- Height: 1.78 m (5 ft 10 in)
- Weight: 78 kg (172 lb; 12 st 4 lb)
- School: Grey College, Bloemfontein
- Notable relative: Cobus Reinach (son)

Rugby union career
- Position: Wing
Provincial / State sides
Years	Team	Apps	(Points)
- Free State
International career
Years	Team	Apps	(Points)
1986	South Africa	4	(8)

Jacobus "Jaco" Reinach (Ceres, 1 January 1962 – Kroonstad, 21 January 1997) was a Springbok rugby player and athlete.

== Athletics career ==
Reinach is the last person to earn Springbok colours in athletics and rugby, as Springbok colours are now limited to rugby only. At the time of his death he was still the SA record holder in the 400m with a time of 45.01 seconds, which he set on 15 April 1983 at the South African senior championships in front of his home crowd in Bloemfontein. The record at that stage was 45.5 seconds, which was held by Malcolm Spence, Spence set the record in the 1960 Olympic Games in Rome by earning 3rd place. Reinach's 16 year old 400m record was only broken in March 1999 by the 400m athlete Arnaud Malherbe. A year later Hendrik Mokganyetsi equaled the record in Yokohama in September 2000.

== Rugby career ==
Reinach made his Springbok test debut on 10 May 1986 against the New Zealand Cavaliers at Newlands in the first Springbok test match captained by Naas Botha. The other debutants in the Springbok team that day were Uli Schmidt, Gert Smal, Christo Ferreira, Jannie Breedt and Wahl Bartmann. On 31 May that year he played in his fourth and last test match against the Cavaliers. He played on the wing and scored two tries in four rugby test matches for the Springboks in 1986.

=== Test history ===
No.	Opposition	Result (SA 1st)	Position	Tries	Date	Venue
1.	New Zealand Cavaliers	21-15	Wing		10 May 1986	Newlands, Cape Town
2.	New Zealand Cavaliers	18-19	Wing	1	17 May 1986	Kings Park, Durban
3.	New Zealand Cavaliers	33-18	Wing	1	24 May 1986	Loftus Versfeld, Pretoria
4.	New Zealand Cavaliers	24-10	Wing		31 May 1986	Ellis Park, Johannesburg

== Death ==
Reinach died on Tuesday 21 January 1997, 20 days after his 35th birthday, when his car left the road outside Kroonstad and rolled. According to a report which appeared in Beeld newspaper the next day, the accident occurred after 14:00 when Reinach drove through a puddle of water in the road between Kroonstad and Ventersburg. The car presumably slid off the road, rolled and struck a tree. Reinach who was driving to Johannesburg, died instantly.

== Personal ==
At the time of the accident, Reinach's wife Annette was expecting their third son. He was born the following month. His other two sons, Herman and Cobus were respectively aged nine and six years old at the time. Cobus followed in his father's and grandfather's footsteps and played in the Grey College First Fifteen. He was also survived by his parents Dr Herman and Petro Reinach, two brothers, Norman and Herman, and two sisters, Ronell and Monica. Cobus, born on 7 February 1990, moved to Durban in 2011 where he coached rugby at Glenwood High School. He is a scrumhalf and played for the Sharks in the Currie Cup, Vodacom Cup and Super Rugby until 2017, where after he joined Northampton Saints in the English Premiership.

== See also ==
- List of South Africa national rugby union players – Springbok no. 542
- List of South Africa national under-18 rugby union team players

Translated from the Afrikaans wikipedia page: af:Jaco Reinach
