= Hoërskool Monument =

Public school in Gauteng, South Africa

Location
- Blommenstein Street; Krugersdorp, Gauteng; South Africa; 26.09213°S 27.77581°E

Information
- School type: Public & Boarding
- Motto: Liewer slyt as roes (It’s better to wear out than rust out)
- Religious affiliation: Christianity
- Established: 1 February 1921; 105 years ago
- School district: District 5
- Principal: Mr JSM Callitz
- Staff: 100 full-time
- Grades: 8–12
- Gender: Boys & Girls
- Age: 14 to 18
- Enrollment: 1,500 pupils
- Language: Afrikaans; English
- Schedule: 07:30 - 14:00
- Campus: Urban Campus
- Campus type: Suburban
- Colours: Blue; Gold; Brown
- Nickname: Monnas
- Rivals: Hoërskool Garsfontein; Hoërskool Menlopark; Hoërskool Waterkloof
- Accreditation: Gauteng Department of Education
- Alumni: Old Monnas
- Website: www.monnas.co.za

Hoërskool Monument (English: Monument High School; also known by the nickname Monnas) is a parallel medium (formerly purely Afrikaans medium) strictly Afrikaans as a first language high school situated in Krugersdorp, Gauteng, South Africa.

The cultural activities offered by the school include choir, debate, public speaking, Junior United Nations, Miss Monnas, orators, and revue. The school also offers sports facilities for the following sports: athletics, golf, hockey, cricket, boys and girls, cross country, netball, rugby, chess, swimming, tennis and jukskei.

== History ==
Monument High School was established on 1 February 1921 as an Afrikaans medium secondary school. Current student enrollment is in excess of 1500 pupils.

== Sports ==
=== Rugby ===
==== 1st Team ====
The 'WitBulle' was founded by GW.Jorgenson in 1980

- Winner of Administrator, Directors and Beeld trophy 10 times: (1953, 1979, 1980,1984, 2005, 2009, 2010, 2017, 2018 and 2022)
- Won National Media 24 competition in 2003
- Transvaal / Golden Lions 1st team Macro Schools Competition champs for 25 years
- Nupower/ Tuks University 1st team winners in 2009, 2010, 2016, 2017 and 2018

== Notable alumni ==
See also Category:Alumni of Monument High School

=== Politics ===
- F. W. de Klerk, former State President of South Africa and Nobel Prize winner, completed high school education at Monument High School.

=== Sports ===
The following alumni from Monument High School have played for the South Africa national rugby union team:

- Christo Wagenaar (1977)
- Brendan Venter (1994)
- Jaque Fourie (2003)
- Jorrie Muller (2003)
- Heinke van der Merwe (2007)
- Willem Alberts (2010)
- Jaco Taute (2013)
- Ruan Dreyer (2016)
- Julian Redelinghuys (2016)

The following alumni from Monument High School have played for other International rugby union teams:

- Gert Peens, a South Africa-born, former Monument High School student and is an Italian rugby union player capped in 2002.
- Quintin Geldenhuys, is a former Monument High School student and a South Africa-born Italian rugby union player capped in 2010.
- Paul Willemse (France)
- Jaco van der Walt (Edinburgh and Scotland)
- Nathan McBeth (Glasgow and Scotland)

In addition to the school's international success, Monument High School is one of the top producers of professional rugby players in South Africa, alongside other elite rugby schools like Grey College, Paul Roos Gymnasium, Bishops College and Afrikaanse Hoër Seunskool
