= David Grey Rattray =

South African historian (1958–2007)

- Born: David Grey Rattray; 6 September 1958; Johannesburg, South Africa
- Died: 26 January 2007 (aged 48); Durban, South Africa
- Cause of death: Gunshot wound
- Education: St. Alban's College
- Alma mater: University of Natal
- Children: 3

David Grey Rattray (6 September 1958 – 26 January 2007) was a South African historian of the 1879 Anglo-Zulu War in South Africa, also well known as a tour guide.

== Biography ==
Rattray was born in Johannesburg, matriculated from the St. Alban's College in Pretoria, and studied entomology (the study of insects) at the University of Natal, Pietermaritzburg, where he graduated in 1982. From 1983 to 1988 he managed the Mala Mala Game Reserve situated on the doorstep of Kruger National Park. In 1989 he and his family moved to their family farm at Rorke's Drift, where the Battle of Isandlwana and Battle of Rorke's Drift took place between the Zulus and British soldiers. He and his wife, Nicky, established and operated the Fugitives' Drift Lodge.

He gained considerable knowledge about the conflicts between the Zulus and British in South Africa as a child as he accompanied his father, an amateur historian himself, as he interviewed Zulus in the local community to obtain their accounts of the conflict, some of whose forebears had fought in those wars.

He provided tours of the historic battle sites of Isandlwana and Rorke's Drift, and his tours are estimated to have been attended by more than 60 000 visitors. He was a fellow of the Royal Geographical Society in London, and his annual lectures there are reported to have been always well attended.

Rattray, aged 48, was shot dead on his farm in KwaZulu-Natal on 26 January 2007 during an armed robbery attempt by six men. His funeral was held at Michaelhouse, a boarding school in Balgowan where two of his sons were scholars at the time, and his ashes are interred on the family property at Rorke's Drift in the Natal Midlands. Five of the gang, including the murderer, were subsequently arrested and sentenced to life imprisonment.
