= Jeremy Reingold =

South African rugby player

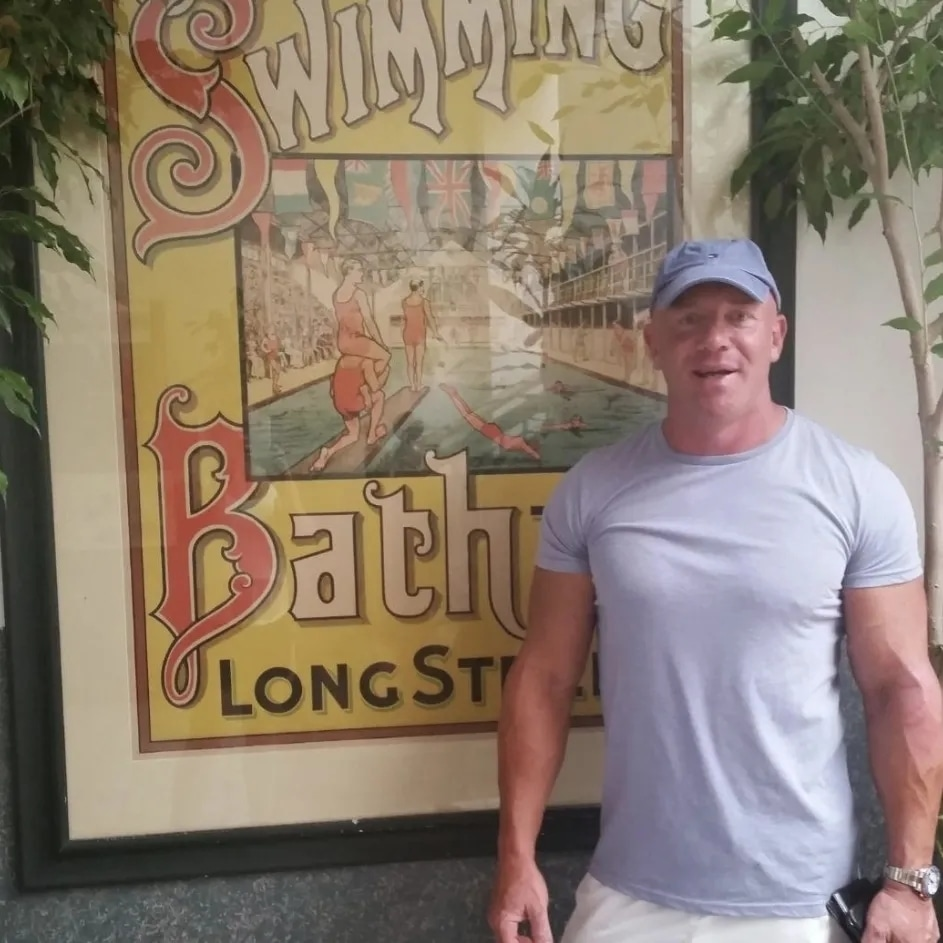

Personal information
- Nationality: South African
- Born: Cape Town, South Africa
- Occupation: Businessman
- Height: 1.85 m (6 ft 1 in)
- Weight: 99 kg (218 lb)
- Spouse: Carina Marx
- Children: 2

Sport
- Sport: Swimming
- Strokes: 200 m individual medley

Jeremy Reingold is a former South African swimmer and rugby player. In 1980 he set the world record in the 200m individual medley (swimming).

== Biography ==
Reingold is from Cape Town, South Africa. He is married to obstacle course racing champion Carina Marx.

In 1980 he set the senior world record in the 200 meter long course individual medley at 2:03.01 in Cape Town. Reingold broke the prior record, which had been set by American Bill Barrett. Reingold has two children from a previous marriage.

Later, Reingold was a member of the South Africa national under-18 rugby union team.

== Controversy ==
Reingold, an electronic security expert sold his business to a public entity has been associated with late controversial former Rhodesian Rugby Captain and USD billionaire late John Bredenkamp partnering in aircraft ownership and diamond deal making in Africa specifically Central African Republic. Reingold also founded, managed the successfully sponsored "Team Jeep" of international athletes (Mountain biking, Paddle skiing, triathletes, obstacle course competitors and trail runners) producing a number of World Champions. https://x.com/rocksolidau/status/1631311150586404864?t=UAI9IoouH7iStkhrQkUsLQ&s=19

== Other interests ==
Reingold is a noted collector and expert on vintage car, boat, and high performance motorcycles. He has concluded some of the worlds rarest car sales including a 1930s Bentley Blue Train Recreation ( Gurney-Nutting Style ) where he represented the private buyer, the final sales price being that of $522,500. Reingold too was the seller of Mclaren F1, Chassis #037 out of South Africa to the United Kingdom at a rumoured, but undisclosed price of 19 million US Dollars in 2020.

https://bmwmregistry.com/detail.php?id=4591 |url=https://boatingsouthafrica.co.za/2023/08/08/classic-boat-found-in-johannesburg-could-have-belonged-to-beatles-star-george-harisson/

== See also ==
- List of South Africa national under-18 rugby union team players
