= Pierre de Villiers (rugby union) =

South African rugby union player

- Full name: Pierre du Plessis de Villiers
- Born: 14 June 1905 Worcester, South Africa
- Died: 14 November 1975 (aged 70)
- Height: 1.75 m (5 ft 9 in)
- Weight: 61.2 kg (135 lb)
- School: Paarl Gimnasium

Rugby union career
- Position: Scrum–half
Provincial / State sides
Years	Team	Apps	(Points)
- Western Province
International career
Years	Team	Apps	(Points)
1928–37	South Africa	8	(0)

Pierre du Plessis de Villiers (14 June 1905 – 14 November 1975) was a South African international rugby union player.

Born in Worcester, de Villiers was educated at Paarl Gimnasium and remained based in Paarl during his career.

A scrum–half, de Villiers debuted for the Springboks in their 1928 home series against the All Blacks. He was a member of the 1931–32 touring squad, but Danie Craven was the preferred scrum–half, and he only played in the match against England. The team met with George V during the tour and he is said to have commented on de Villiers' diminutive size by joking he was too small to be seen by the opposition. He played a home Test match against the Wallabies in 1933, then gained a further three caps on a 1937 tour of Australia, before retiring with a knee injury.

== See also ==
- List of South Africa national rugby union players
