= Kobus Burger =

South African rugby union footballer

- Born: Jacobus Marthinus Burger; 31 March 1964 (age 62) Paarl, Western Cape
- Height: 1.80 m (5 ft 11 in)
- Weight: 83 kg (183 lb)
- School: Paarl Gymnasium, Paarl, Western Cape
- University: Stellenbosch University

Rugby union career
- Position(s): Wing, Centre
Amateur team(s)
Years	Team	Apps	(Points)
- Maties
–	Cape Town Defence		
–	Hamiltons		
–	Bellville RFC		
Provincial / State sides
Years	Team	Apps	(Points)
1985–1993	Western Province	73	
International career
Years	Team	Apps	(Points)
1989	South Africa	2	

Jacobus Marthinus 'Kobus' Burger (born 31 March 1964) is a South African former rugby union player that played two tests for the Springboks.

== Playing career ==
Burger matriculated at Paarl Gymnasium in 1981 and represented the Western Province Schools team at the annual Craven Week tournament in 1980 and 1981. In 1980 his older brother, Schalk was also part of the Western Province team. Burger was selected for the South African Schools team in 1980 and 1981 and in 1980 he was the youngest player in history to be selected for the South African Schools team. Burger enrolled at Stellenbosch University in 1982 and was selected for the Western Province under–20 team and the South Africa Universities under–20 team. He made his senior provincial debut for Western Province in 1985 and once again his brother was part of the team. The brothers were also part of the Western Province team that won the Currie Cup in 1985. Also in the team were two other players with the surname Burger, the wing Niel Burger and the lock, Schalk Burger Snr.

Burger made his test debut for the Springboks against the World XV on 26 August 1989 at his home ground, Newlands in Cape Town. He also played in the second test against the World XV.

=== Test history ===
No.	Opponents	Results(RSA 1st)	Position	Tries	Dates	Venue
1.	World XV	20–19	Wing		26 Aug 1989	Newlands, Cape Town
2.	World XV	22–16	Wing		2 Sep 1989	Ellis Park, Johannesburg

== Accolades ==
In 1988, Burger was one of the five Young Players of the Year, along with Christian Stewart, Jacques du Plessis, Andre Joubert and JJ van der Walt.

== See also ==
- List of South Africa national rugby union players – Springbok no. 552
- List of South Africa national under-18 rugby union team players
