= Wynand Mans =

South African rugby union player

- Full name: Wynand Jacobus Mans
- Born: 21 February 1942 Fraserburg, South Africa
- Died: 6 December 2018 (aged 76) Hermanus, South Africa
- Height: 1.82 m (6 ft 0 in)
- Weight: 85.3 kg (188 lb)
- School: Paarl Gimnasium

Rugby union career
- Position: Centre
Provincial / State sides
Years	Team	Apps	(Points)
1963–67	Western Province		
International career
Years	Team	Apps	(Points)
1965	South Africa	2	(5)

Wynand Jacobus Mans (21 February 1942 – 6 December 2018) was a South African international rugby union player.

Mans was born in Fraserburg and educated at Paarl Gimnasium.

A three–quarter, Mans played for Western Province clubs Northerns (Connect NTK RFC) situated in Parow North, Paarl and Durbanville. He made his provincial debut aged 21 and in 1965 was a member of two Springboks tours. On a tour of Europe, Mans played as an inside centre for his only two Springboks caps, scoring a try on debut against Ireland in Dublin. His other match was against Scotland at Murrayfield and he contributed a conversion. He retained his place for their tour of Australia and New Zealand, where he was often utilised as a winger, but was hampered by multiple injuries and played only minor tour matches.

Mans refereed Currie Cup matches during the late 1980s. The closest he came to officiating at international level was a match played by the New Zealand Cavaliers against Transvaal on their 1986 tour of South Africa.

In 2018, Mans died of complications from motor neurone disease.

== See also ==
- List of South Africa national rugby union players
