= Cobus Reinach =

South African rugby union player

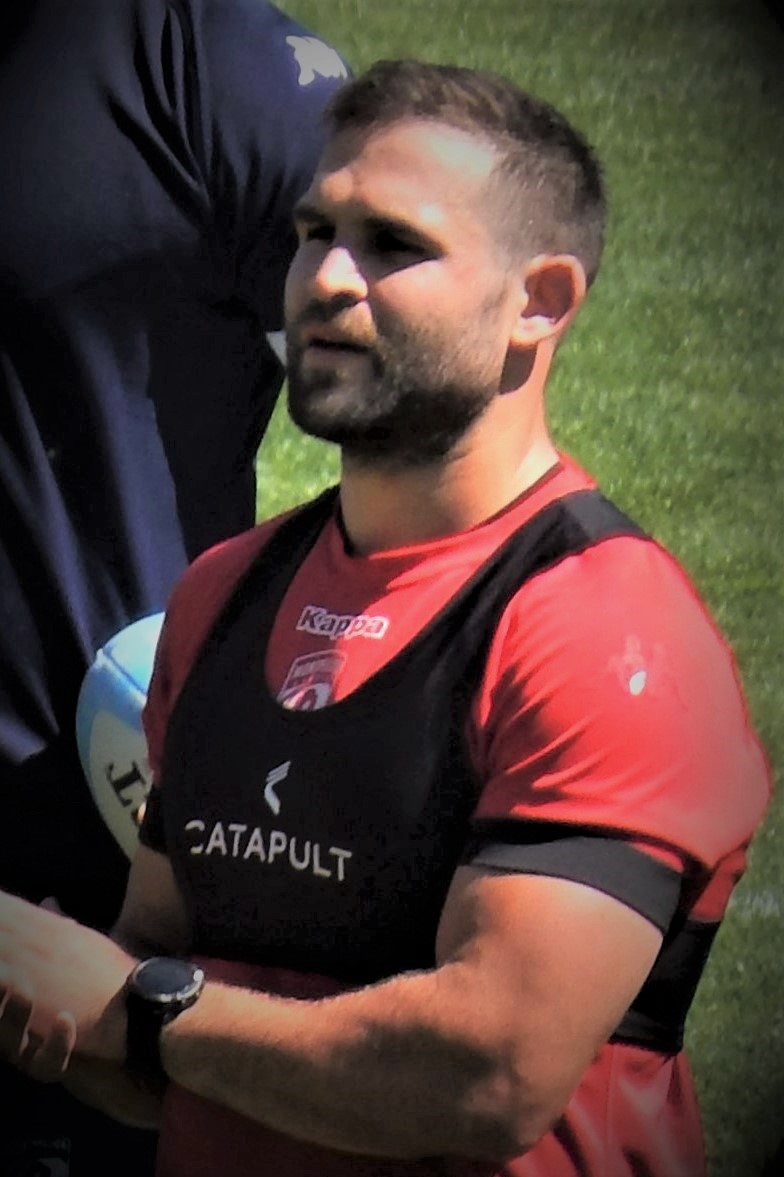
- Reinach training in 2021
- Full name: Jacobus Meyer Reinach
- Born: 7 February 1990 (age 36) Bloemfontein, South Africa
- Height: 1.75 m (5 ft 9 in)
- Weight: 85 kg (13 st 5 lb; 187 lb)
- School: Grey College, Bloemfontein
- Notable relative: Jaco Reinach (father)

Rugby union career
- Position: Scrum-Half
- Current team: Stormers
Youth career
- 2008: Free State Cheetahs
- 2009–2011: Sharks
Senior career
Years	Team	Apps	(Points)
2011–2017	Sharks XV	20	(30)
2011–2017	Sharks (Currie Cup)	33	(30)
2012–2017	Sharks	60	(50)
2017–2020	Northampton Saints	76	(155)
2020–2025	Montpellier	102	(175)
2025–	Stormers	15	(30)
- Correct as of 28 April 2026
International career
Years	Team	Apps	(Points)
2014–present	South Africa	57	(100)
- Correct as of 27 September 2026
Medal record
Men's Rugby union
Representing South Africa
Rugby World Cup
Gold medal – first place	2019 Japan	Squad
Gold medal – first place	2023 France	Squad

Jacobus Meyer Reinach (born 7 February 1990) is a South African professional rugby union player who plays as a scrum-half for the Stormers in the United Rugby Championship and the South Africa national team. He is the son of former Springbok winger Jaco Reinach. He was a member of the victorious Springbok team who won the 2019 and 2023 Rugby World Cup.

== Early career ==
Born and raised in Bloemfontein, Reinach attended the famous rugby school Grey College. He initially played age-level rugby for the Free State, before heading to Durban in 2009 to link up with the Sharks, spending a portion of his club career playing scrum half for SA Home Loans Durban Collegians.

== Club career ==
Reinach's first forays into senior rugby came with the Sharks XV in the Vodacom Cup. During the 2011 and 2012 Vodacom Cup competitions he made 17 appearances and scored 3 tries. His good performances at that level saw him promoted to the Sharks Currie Cup squad. He earned his first 2 Currie Cup caps during the 2011 season and over the following 2 campaigns he rotated with the more experienced Charl McLeod for the starting role in the number 9 jersey. He was a Currie Cup winner in 2013 and a runner up in 2012 with both matched being played against Western Province. Following McLeod's departure to Grenoble at the conclusion of the 2014 Super Rugby season, Reinach was left as the undisputed first-choice scrum half for the Sharks.

At Super Rugby level, Reinach debuted during the 2012 Super Rugby season however, he only made one appearance which amounted to 1 minute of game-time. His performances in tandem with Charl McLeod during the 2012 Currie Cup saw him see much more regular action in 2013 and the two continued their rotation. 2014 saw him become much more of a regular starter and indeed despite missing 4 matches due to injury, Reinach started all 12 of the regular season matches he was available for and scored 6 tries including a memorable effort in the Sharks first ever win away to the Crusaders in Christchurch.

On 27 February 2017, it was announced that Reinach would link up with English club Northampton Saints in the Aviva Premiership from the 2017–18 season.

On 12 June 2020, Reinach officially joined Montpellier in the Top 14 ahead of the 2020–21 season after leaving Northampton.

== International career ==
Although his father had twice been selected for South African Schools, Reinach never represented his country at any age-group level. However, this did not stop him from making the full Springbok side at the age of only 24. He was called up to the Springbok squad for the 2014 Rugby Championship due to the absence of the injured Fourie du Preez and when another experienced number 9 in Ruan Pienaar went down injured during the Boks tour of Australasia, Reinach was promoted to back-up scrum-half for the remaining two home games of the competition against Australia and New Zealand. Reinach debuted as a second-half replacement for Francois Hougaard in South Africa's 28–10 win over Australia in Cape Town on 27 September 2014 and played a big role in the Boks bonus point try scored by Jean de Villiers in the final minute. He got his second taste of international rugby a week later and was again on the winning side as his team earned their first win over the All Blacks since 2011. On 8 October 2019 Reinach scored a hat-trick in a 66–7 win over Canada at the 2019 Rugby World Cup, the fastest hat-trick in Rugby World Cup History. South Africa went on to win the tournament, defeating England in the final.

== International statistics ==
=== Test Match record ===
As of 15 November 2026

Against	P	W	D	L	Tri	Pts	%Won
Argentina	11	9	0	2	4	20	81.82
Australia	8	6	0	2	1	5	75
British & Irish Lions	1	1	0	0	0	0	100
Canada	1	1	0	0	3	15	100
England	5	4	0	1	1	5	80
France	4	2	0	2	2	10	50
Georgia	1	1	0	0	1	5	100
Ireland	3	1	0	2	1	5	33.33
Italy	3	3	0	0	2	10	100
Japan	1	1	0	0	0	0	100
Namibia	1	1	0	0	0	0	100
New Zealand	10	7	0	3	1	5	70
Portugal	1	1	0	0	0	0	100
Romania	1	1	0	0	3	15	100
Scotland	1	1	0	0	0	0	100
Tonga	1	1	0	0	1	5	100
Wales	5	4	0	1	1	5	80
Total	58	45	0	13	21	105	77.59

Pld = Games Played, W = Games Won, D = Games Drawn, L = Games Lost, Tri = Tries Scored, Pts = Points Scored

=== International tries ===
As of 15 November 2026

Try	Opposing team	Location	Venue	Competition	Date	Result	Score
1	England	London, England	Twickenham Stadium	2014 end-of-year tests	15 November 2014	Win	28–31
2	Italy	Padua, Italy	Stadio Euganeo	2014 end-of-year tests	22 November 2014	Win	6–22
3	Australia	Johannesburg, South Africa	Ellis Park Stadium	2019 Rugby Championship	20 July 2019	Win	35–17
4	Canada	Kobe, Japan	Kobe Misaki Stadium	2019 Rugby World Cup Pool B	8 October 2019	Win	66–7
5	Canada	Kobe, Japan	Kobe Misaki Stadium	2019 Rugby World Cup Pool B	8 October 2019	Win	66–7
6	Canada	Kobe, Japan	Kobe Misaki Stadium	2019 Rugby World Cup Pool B	8 October 2019	Win	66–7
7	Georgia	Pretoria, South Africa	Loftus Versfeld Stadium	2021 July tests	2 July 2021	Win	40–9
8	Argentina	Port Elizabeth, South Africa	Nelson Mandela Bay Stadium	2021 Rugby Championship	14 August 2021	Win	32–12
9	Italy	Genoa, Italy	Stadio Luigi Ferraris	2022 end-of-year tests	19 November 2022	Win	21–63
10	Romania	Bordeaux, France	Nouveau Stade de Bordeaux	2023 Rugby World Cup Pool B	17 September 2023	Win	76–0
11	Romania	Bordeaux, France	Nouveau Stade de Bordeaux	2023 Rugby World Cup Pool B	17 September 2023	Win	76–0
12	Romania	Bordeaux, France	Nouveau Stade de Bordeaux	2023 Rugby World Cup Pool B	17 September 2023	Win	76–0
13	Tonga	Marseille, France	Stade Vélodrome	2023 Rugby World Cup Pool B	1 October 2023	Win	49–18
14	Argentina	Santiago del Estero, Argentina	Estadio Único Madre de Ciudades	2024 Rugby Championship	21 September 2024	Loss	29–28
15	New Zealand	Auckland, New Zealand	Eden Park	2025 Rugby Championship	6 September 2025	Loss	24–17
16	Argentina	London, England	Twickenham Stadium	2025 Rugby Championship	4 October 2025	Win	27–29
17	Argentina	London, England	Twickenham Stadium	2025 Rugby Championship	4 October 2025	Win	27–29
18	France	Saint-Denis, France	Stade de France	2025 end-of-year tests	8 November 2025	Win	17–32
19	Ireland	Dublin, Ireland	Aviva Stadium	2025 end-of-year tests	22 November 2025	Win	13–24
20	Wales	Durban, South Africa	Kings Park Stadium	2026 Nations Championship	18 July 2026	Win	43–0
21	France	Saint-Denis, France	Stade de France	2026 Nations Championship	13 November 2026	Loss	21–19

== Honours ==
South Africa

- 2019 Rugby Championship winner
- 2019 Rugby World Cup winner
- 2021 British & Irish Lions Series winner
- 2023 Rugby World Cup winner
- 2024 Rugby Championship winner
- 2025 Rugby Championship winner
