= Grey College, Bloemfontein =

Coordinates: 29°6′34″S 26°11′48″E

Grey College
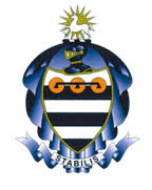
- Grey College school crest

Location
- Jock Meiring St, Bloemfontein, Free State; South Africa

Information
- School type: All-boys public school
- Motto: Nihil stabile quod infidum (Nothing is steadfast, which is not true)
- Religious affiliation: Christianity
- Established: 13 October 1855; 171 years ago
- Founder: Sir George Grey
- Sister school: C&N Meisieskool Oranje
- School district: District 9
- Principal: Braam van Wyk
- Headmaster: Jurie Geldenhuis (Primary School)
- Grades: 00–12
- Gender: Male
- Language: Afrikaans; English
- Schedule: 07:30 – 13:50
- Campus: Urban Campus
- Houses: Brill House; Leith House; Murray House; Jock Meiring House; Oelschig Huis
- Colours: Gold; Navy; White
- Nickname: GCB; The College; Grey
- Rivals: Afrikaanse Hoër Seunskool; Grey High School; Paul Roos Gymnasium; Paarl Boys' High School; Hoër Landbouskool Oakdale; Paarl Gimnasium
- Accreditation: Free State Department of Education
- School fees: R52 755 (boarding); R47 850 (tuition)
- Alumni: Old Greys
- Website: Grey College

Grey College (Afrikaans: Grey Kollege) is a public English & Afrikaans medium school for boys situated in the suburb of Universitas in Bloemfontein in the Free State province of South Africa, it is one of the 23 Milner Schools.

Grey College was ranked 1st among high schools in Africa by Africa Almanac in 2003 and 2013, based upon quality of education, student engagement, strength and activities of alumni, school profile, internet and news visibility.

== History ==
The Grey College is named after Sir George Grey, the Cape Colony governor whose substantial donation enabled its establishment. The school was officially opened on 13 October 1855 and the first headmaster was the Reverend Andrew Murray. Believed by scholars and alumni to be the third-oldest school in South Africa, there are in fact several other schools that were established at earlier dates as far back as 1738. With formal education being established later in the northern regions of the country, it is the oldest school north of the Orange River.

During his presidential inauguration speech in 1896, while addressing learners from Grey College, Marthinus Theunis Steyn mentioned that he envisioned a university for Bloemfontein where youth from all over the country could come and study. He supported the idea that Grey College should provide higher education to the people of the Orange Free State. As a result, the University of the Free State essentially came into existence in 1904 when a tertiary portion of Grey College was allocated for such purpose.

== Grey College today ==
The school grounds consist of a number of historic buildings, of which five are Free State provincial heritage sites: the Main building and Hamilton Hall, the Andrew Murray House, the Brill House and the Tuck shop.

The school offers a number of scholarships such as the Badawi Legacy scholarship given in partnership with Montpellier Rugby Club to promote rugby, education and French culture. Old Greys donate funds to the Jock Meiring Trust and Bram Fisher Trust, funds used for the administration of school grounds and granting of scholarships.

Grey College is known nationally for being particularly strong at the sport of rugby, the "secret" handshake, and old boys speaking passionately about their school.

== Gallery ==
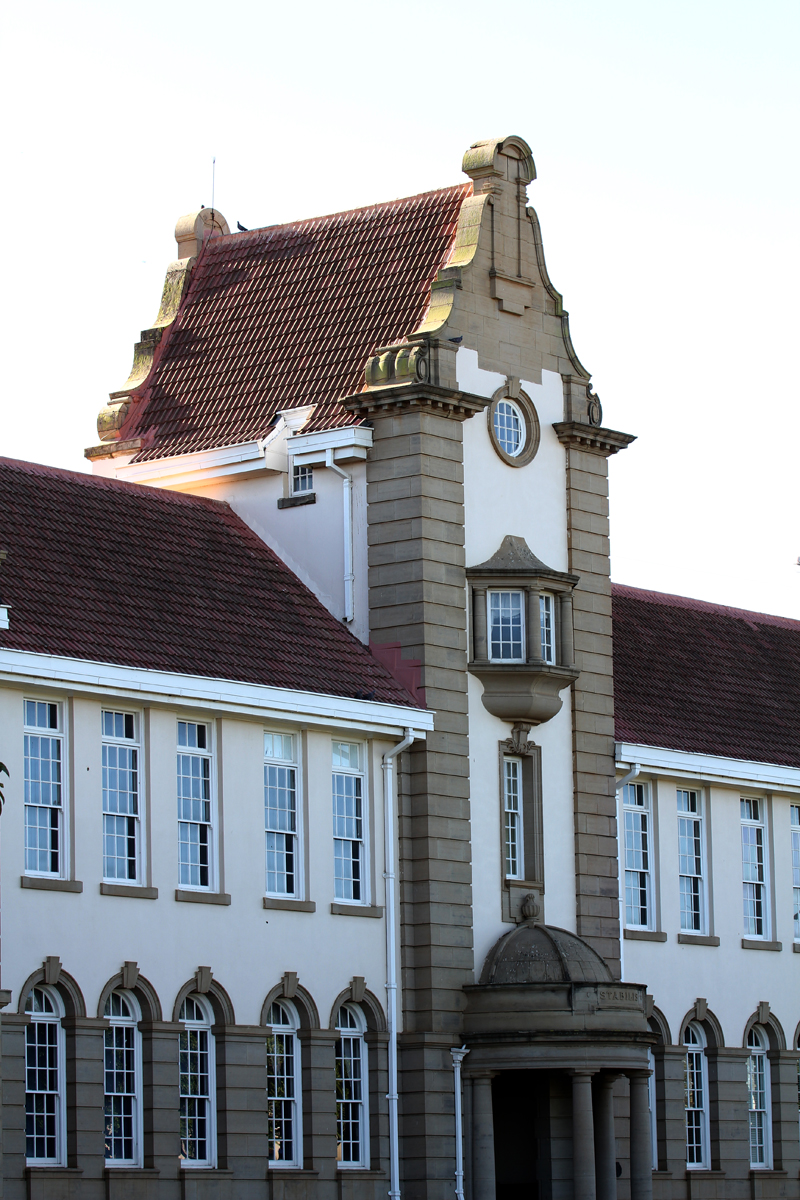
Main Building

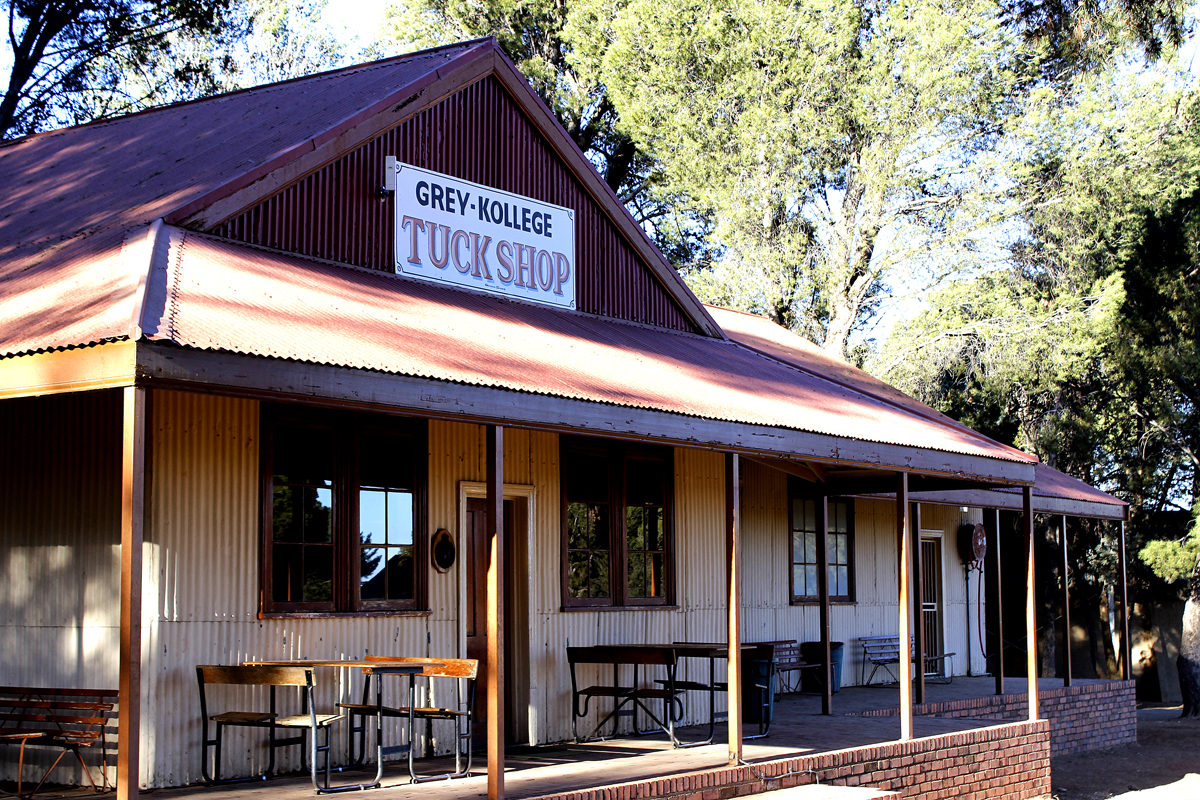
The Tuck Shop

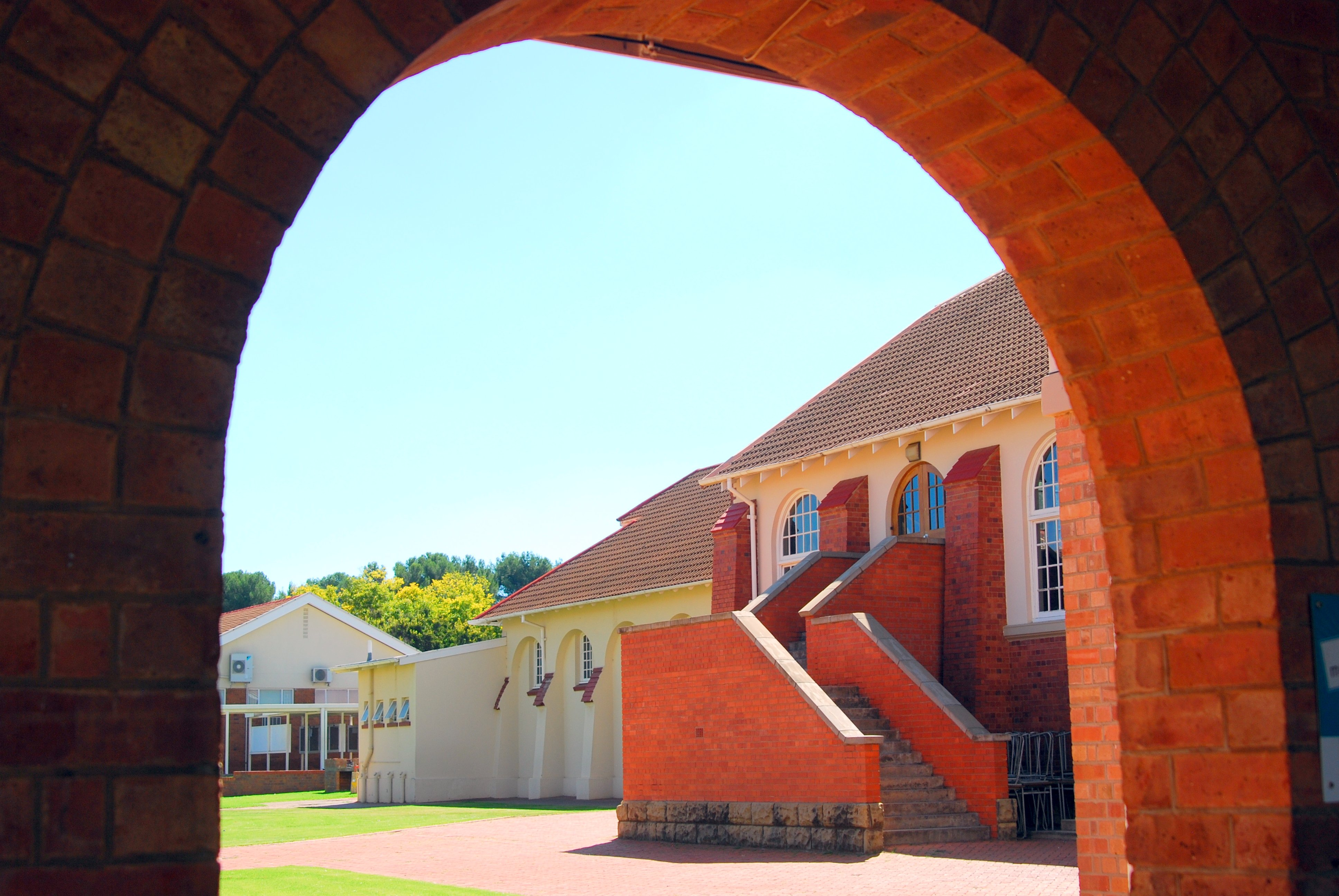
Reunion Hall

== Notable alumni ==
- Sir Laurens van der Post was political adviser to British heads of government, close friend of King Charles III, godfather of Prince William, educator, journalist, humanitarian, philosopher, explorer and conservationist.
- Ernst Oswald Johannes Westphal, linguist and scholar, of the School of Oriental and African Studies and the University of Cape Town.
- Jopie Fourie, military scout & dispatch rider
- Etienne Leroux, Afrikaans author and a key member of the South African Sestigers literary movement.
- Charl du Plessis, pianist.
- Denis Earp, chief of the South African Air Force
- Bram Fischer, anti-apartheid activist and advocate for Nelson Mandela in the Rivonia Trial
- Steve Hofmeyr, singer, songwriter, actor, political activist
- Deneys Reitz, Boer soldier, South African soldier in the First World War, and politician.
- Martinus Theunis Steyn, president of the Orange Free State
- Pieter Uys, Vodacom CEO
- Pierre van Ryneveld, founding commander of the South African Air Force

=== Athletes ===
- Ryk Neethling, Olympic gold medalist swimmer
- Pierre-Gerard Geldenhuys, South African Men's Field & Indoor Hockey
- L.J. van Zyl, athlete, Commonwealth Games champion in the 400m Hurdles
- Wayde van Niekerk, Olympic Gold Medalist 400m Athlete & World record holder 400m track
- Richardt Strauss, Ireland international rugby player

South Africa national cricket team players

- Kepler Wessels
- Victor Mpitsang
- Nicky Boje
- Hansie Cronje (his ashes are kept at the school)
- Ryan McLaren
- Boeta Dippenaar
- Corrie van Zyl
- Rilee Rossouw
- Gerald Coetzee

Springbok rugby players

- CJ van der Linde
- Flip van der Merwe
- Francois Venter
- Popeye Strydom
- Deon Stegmann
- François Steyn (Rugby World Cup 2007 and (Rugby World Cup 2019 winning teams)
- Johan Goosen
- Coenie Oosthuizen
- Ruan Pienaar (also played for Ulster)
- Helgard Muller
- Pieter Muller
- Ruben Kruger (Rugby World Cup 1995 winning team)
- Ollie le Roux
- Tiaan Liebenberg
- Louis Babrow
- Heinrich Brüssow
- Naka Drotské (Rugby World Cup 1995 winning team)
- Bismarck du Plessis (Rugby World Cup 2007 winning team)
- Jannie du Plessis (Rugby World Cup 2007 winning team)
- Morne du Plessis (member of the International Rugby Hall of Fame)
- Wian du Preez
- Charl Marais
- Johan Styger
- Heinrich Füls
- Werner Swanepoel
- Helgard Muller
- Adriaan Strauss
- Andries Truscott
- Cobus Reinach (Rugby World Cup 2019 and Rugby World Cup 2023 winning teams)
- Jaco Reinach
- Francois Venter

Bafana Bafana football players

- Tshegofatso Mabasa(Orlando Pirates Player)

== Sports ==
Sources:

- Athletics
- Chess
- Cricket
- Cycling
- Duathlon
- E-Sport
- Golf
- Gym
- Hockey
- Pool
- Rugby
- Squash
- Swimming
- Table tennis
- Tennis
- Waterpolo
- Wrestling

== Subjects ==
- Arts and Culture
- Afrikaans
- Business Studies
- Computer Application Technology
- Economics
- Engineering Graphics and Design
- English
- Geography
- German
- Life Orientation
- Life Science
- Mathematics
- Mathematical Literacy
- Music
- Information Technology (Delphi Programming) - Extra Subject
- Physical Science
- Sport Science
- Technology
- Tourism
