= St. Alban's College =

- St. Alban's College school crest

Location
- 110 Clearwater Road, Lynnwood Glen; Pretoria, Gauteng; South Africa; 25°46′25″S 28°17′03″E

Information
- School type: All-boys private school
- Motto: Custos Veritatis meaning "Guardians Of The Truth"
- Religious affiliation: Anglican Diocese
- Patron saint: St. Alban
- Established: 1 February 1963; 63 years ago
- Founder: On 6 February 1962, the St Alban’s College Foundation is legally established. The Trustees are: Bishop Edward Knapp-Fisher, Honourable Adrian Roberts, Acting Judge of the Supreme Court, Gerald Savage, Mello MacRobert, Bob Hamilton, William Davidson and Monty Knoll.
- Locale: Lynnwood Glen (Suburban)
- Sister school: St. Mary's Diocesan School for Girls (Former)
- School number: +27 (012) 348 1221
- Headmaster: Shane Kidwell
- Exam board: IEB
- Grades: 8–12 (Forms I–V)
- Gender: Male
- Age: 14 to 18
- Enrollment: 600 boys
- Language: English
- Schedule: 07:30 - 14:00
- Campus: Urban Campus
- Campus type: Suburban
- Houses: Boarding houses: Knoll; MacRobert; Ochse; John Tsebe; Dayboy houses: Baloyi; De Beer; Knapp-Fisher; Murray
- Colours: Blue; Grey
- Song: Laud the grace of God victorious
- Rivals: Pretoria Boys High School; St Benedict's College, Bedfordview; St Stithians College; St John’s College
- Newspaper: The Albanian; The Mitre
- Yearbook: The Glave
- Feeder schools: Waterkloof House Preparatory School; Woodhill College
- Alumni: Old Albanians
- School fees: R328,850 (Boarding & Tuition); R155,100 (Day Scholar) p.a.
- Website: www.stalbanscollege.com
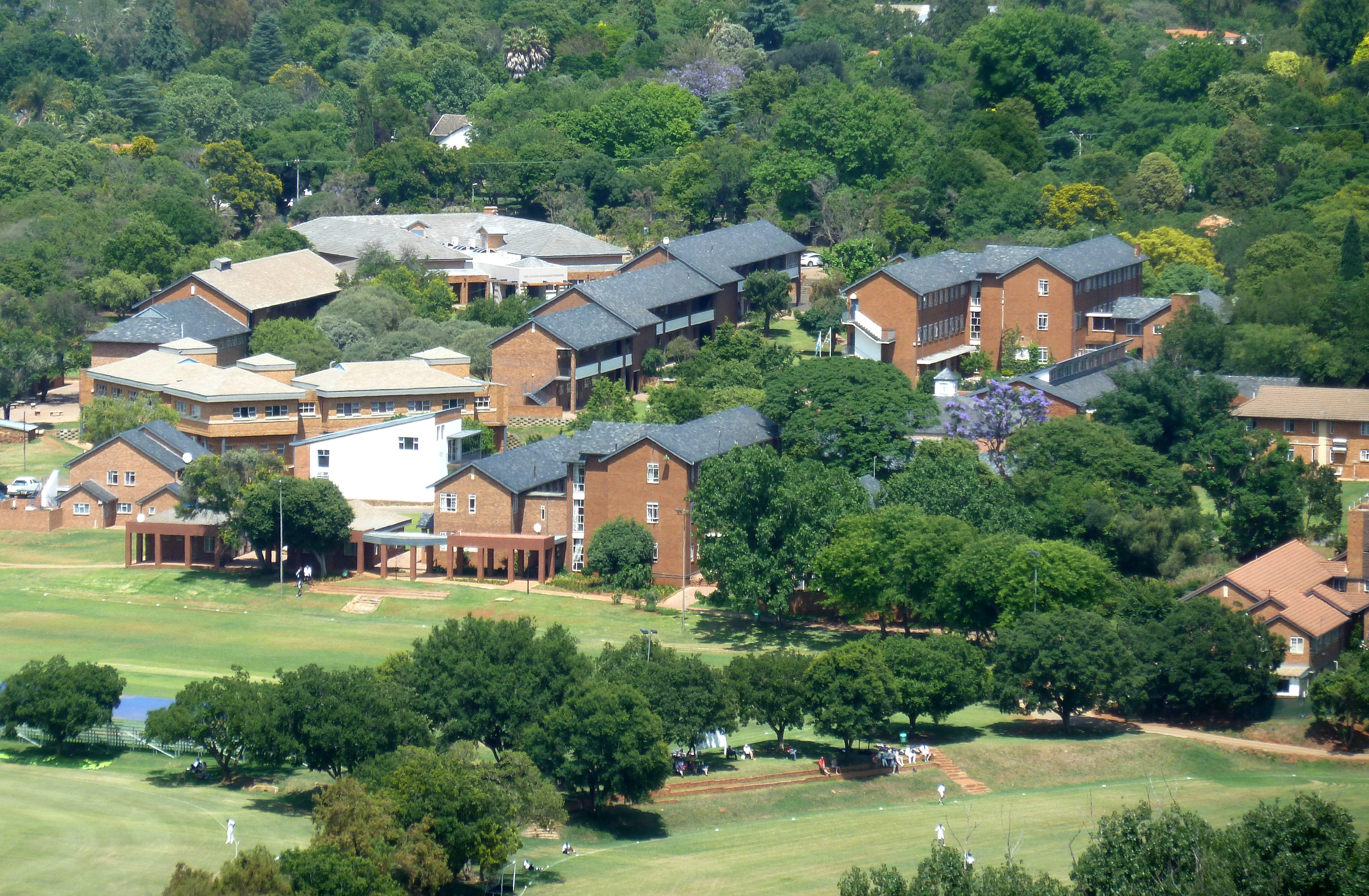

St. Alban's College is a private, boarding, English medium and day high school for boys situated in the suburb of Lynnwood Glen in Pretoria in the Gauteng province of South Africa. It was founded in 1963 by Anton Murray. Its history, influence, wealth, and academic reputation have made it one of the most prestigious schools in South Africa. The sister school is called St. Mary's Diocesan School for Girls, Pretoria.

== History ==
The school was founded on 1 February 1963 with a student body of 37 boys and 3 masters. It now has 580 boys and 43 teachers plus support staff.

The founder-Headmaster, Anton Murray, was a South African cricketer, who worked for twenty one years at the school. Paul Marsh was headmaster during a transitional phase lasting for four years. Ronnie Todd introduced many radical changes during his ten years as headmaster, and following his position as headmaster went on to open St Peter's College. The fourth headmaster was Grant Nupen, who was one of the 37 Foundation Scholars in 1963 and went on to become the first Head Boy, a position he held for three years.

Under the direction of the fifth headmaster, Tom Hamilton, the school celebrated its 50th birthday in 2013.

== Headmasters ==
| Started | Finished | Name |
|---|---|---|
| 1963 | 1981 | Anton Murray |
| 1982 | 1986 | Paul Marsh |
| 1987 | 1997 | Ronnie Todd |
| 1996 | 2001 | Grant Nupen |
| 2001 | 2016 | Thomas Hamilton |
| 2017 | current | Shane Kidwell |

== Sport ==
Sports offered include rugby and hockey (the main sports in the winter time), cricket, swimming, rowing, basketball and water polo (in summer). Other sports are golf, soccer, tennis, squash, athletics and cross-country running (also known as bounds).

The sports that are played at the school are:

- Archery
- Athletics
- Basketball
- Chess
- Cricket
- Cross country
- Golf
- Hockey
- Mountain biking
- Rowing
- Rugby
- Football (soccer)
- Squash
- Swimming
- Table tennis
- Tennis
- Water polo

== Music ==
Front gate of St Alban's College

The St. Alban's College chapel choir attended the World Choir Games for the first time in the school's history in 2008. In 2010, the choir completed a tour of the United States, where it toured the East Coast and performed at places including the Washington National Cathedral in Washington D.C.

The school has a singing group, the Barbershop Boys, comprising singers selected from the chapel choir, usually around 15-20 boys, who sing a cappella. The Barbershop Boys began the school's "Music Tours" with their tour to Argentina in 2004.

== Notable alumni ==
- Mlungisi Bali (Class of 2009) - South African professional rugby player
- Alan Dodson (Class of 1977) - South African lawyer and Land Claims Court judge
- Dylan Frittelli (Class of 2008) - professional golfer
- Jean-Philip Grobler (Class of 2001) - AKA St. Lucia, front-man for the band St. Lucia
- Jason Jenkins (Class of 2013) - Springbok and Blue Bulls rugby player
- Michael Kumbirai (Class of 2014) - South African professional rugby player
- Shaun Maswanganyi (Class of 2019) - Olympic track athlete
- Bongi Mbonambi (Class of 2009) Springbok professional rugby player
- Simon Miller (Class of 2019) - South African professional rugby player
- Abongile Nonkontwana (Class of 2013) - South African professional rugby player
- David Grey Rattray (Class of 1976) - historian, fellow of the Royal Geographical Society (1958 – 2007)
- John Smith (Class of 2008) - Olympic gold medalist for Rowing, light weight coxless four, 2012 London Olympics.
- Richard Sterne (Class of 1999) - South African professional golfer
- Jabulani Tsambo (Class of 1998) - South African hip-hop artist
- Dan van Zyl (Class of 1989) - South African professional cricket & rugby player
