= Julian Redelinghuys =

South African rugby union player

- Born: 11 September 1989 (age 37) Pretoria, South Africa
- Height: 1.76 m (5 ft 9 1/2 in)
- Weight: 100 kg (15 st 10 lb; 220 lb)
- School: Hoërskool Monument

Rugby union career
- Position: Prop
Youth career
- 2005–2007: Golden Lions
- 2008–2010: Sharks
Senior career
Years	Team	Apps	(Points)
2009–2012	Sharks (Currie Cup)	9	(0)
2010–2011	Sharks XV	8	(0)
2012	Sharks	0	(0)
2013	Golden Lions XV	4	(5)
2013–2016	Lions	47	(5)
2013–2016	Golden Lions	22	(0)
- Correct as of 25 October 2016
International career
Years	Team	Apps	(Points)
2006–2007	S.A. Schools		
2009	South Africa Under-20		
2014–2016	South Africa	8	(0)
- Correct as of 8 October 2016

Julian Redelinghuys (born 11 September 1989) is a South African rugby union footballer. His regular playing position is prop.

== Career ==
He started playing youth rugby for the Golden Lions and was included in S.A. Schools squads in 2006 and 2007. In 2009, he joined the Sharks academy, where he got selected for the South Africa Under-20 team for the 2009 IRB Junior World Championship.

He played several games for the Sharks in the Vodacom Cup and Currie Cup competitions, but did not make a Super Rugby appearance, despite being named in the Sharks squad for the 2012 Super Rugby season.

In 2013, he joined the Golden Lions.

He played in both legs of the Lions' promotion/relegation matches after the 2013 Super Rugby season, which saw the Lions regain their spot in Super Rugby.

He was then included in the Lions squad for the 2014 Super Rugby season and made his Super Rugby debut in a 21–20 victory over the Cheetahs in Bloemfontein.
