= Mlungisi Bali =

South African rugby union player

- Born: 1 June 1990 East London, South Africa
- Died: 3 January 2018 (aged 27) East London, South Africa
- Height: 1.96 m (6 ft 5 in)
- Weight: 105 kg (16 st 7 lb; 231 lb)
- School: St. Alban's College, Pretoria

Rugby union career
- Position: Lock
- Current team: Border Bulldogs
Youth career
- 2006: Border Bulldogs
- 2007–2010: Blue Bulls
Senior career
Years	Team	Apps	(Points)
2013–2014	Griffons	25	(0)
2016	Border Bulldogs	0	(0)
- Correct as of 8 January 2016
International career
Years	Team	Apps	(Points)
2007	S.A. Schools Academy		
2008	S.A. Schools		
2010	South Africa Under-20	4	(0)
- Correct as of 30 June 2014

Mlungisi Bali (1 June 1990 – 3 January 2018) was a South African rugby union player that played first class rugby for the Griffons in 2013 and 2014, and also represented the South Africa Under-20 at the 2010 IRB Junior World Championship. His regular position was lock.

== Career ==
=== Youth ===
He represented East London side the Border Bulldogs at the 2006 Under-16 Grant Khomo Week before moving to Pretoria to attend St. Alban's College. He was selected in the Blue Bulls' Under–18 Craven Week side in 2007 (which led to him being named in a South African Schools Academy side that faced the South African Schools side) and in 2008 (which led to his inclusion in the main South African Schools side).

He played for the Blue Bulls U19 side in the 2008 and 2009 Under-19 Provincial Championships and for the Blue Bulls U21 side in the 2010 Under-21 Provincial Championship. In 2010, he was selected for the South Africa Under-20 side that played at the 2010 IRB Junior World Championship in Argentina. He was an unused reserve in their first match against Tonga, but started in their 73–0 victory over Scotland. He played off the bench in their remaining three matches – the final pool stage match against Australia, their 36–7 semi-final defeat to eventual winners New Zealand and their third-place play-off match against England.

=== Griffons ===
Bali failed to break into the first team at the Blue Bulls and made the move to Welkom to join the Griffons prior to the 2013 season. He made his provincial first class debut for them during the 2013 Vodacom Cup competition when he started their match against the Limpopo Blue Bulls. After making a total of seven appearances in the 2013 Vodacom Cup, he was also included in their Currie Cup side and made his debut in that competition on 10 August 2013, in a match against the Boland Cavaliers. He made a total of six appearances in the competition and the same amount in the 2014 Vodacom Cup, all of them from the start.

== Death ==
Bali was the victim of a stabbing incident at a traditional homecoming ceremony in Mdantsane in December 2017. He was admitted to Frere Hospital in East London, where he died from his injuries on 3 January 2018, aged 27.
