= Frank Goedeke =

German rugby player

- Born: South Africa
- School: Carter High School
- University: Technikon Natal; University of Natal

Rugby union career
- Position(s): Centre, Wing, Fullback
Amateur team(s)
Years	Team	Apps	(Points)
1991-1992	Technikon Natal		
1993-1997	Natal University		
1999-2000	TSV Victoria Linden		
2000-2001	SC Neuenheim		
Provincial / State sides
Years	Team	Apps	(Points)
1994	Natal	Duikers	
International career
Years	Team	Apps	(Points)
1999–2001	Germany	5	
National sevens team
Years	Team		Comps
1997–2000	Germany		

Frank Goedeke is a retired South African-born German rugby player. He gained selection as a utility player in the German Sevens team and as a centre for the German national team in the late 1990s.

== Early life ==
Goedeke received his schooling in South Africa, where he played wing for Maritzburg College and the University of Natal, as well as representative teams such as the South African Schools' XV and the Natal Duikers.

== Playing career ==
In Germany, Goedeke was a member of the TSV Victoria Linden squad which reached the final of the 2000 German Championship and won the national Sevens Championship later that year.

Goedeke represented the German Sevens team in the Punta Del Este and Mar del Plata legs of the 1999–00 World Sevens Series. He also played for the German national XV in the German Rugby Federation Centenary Match against the Barbarians in 2000 and in the European Nations Cup in 2001.

== Club Honours ==
- German Rugby Sevens championship - TSV Victoria Linden 2000
