= Woodridge College =

Coordinates: 33.9178°S 25.203°E

Woodridge College and Preparatory School
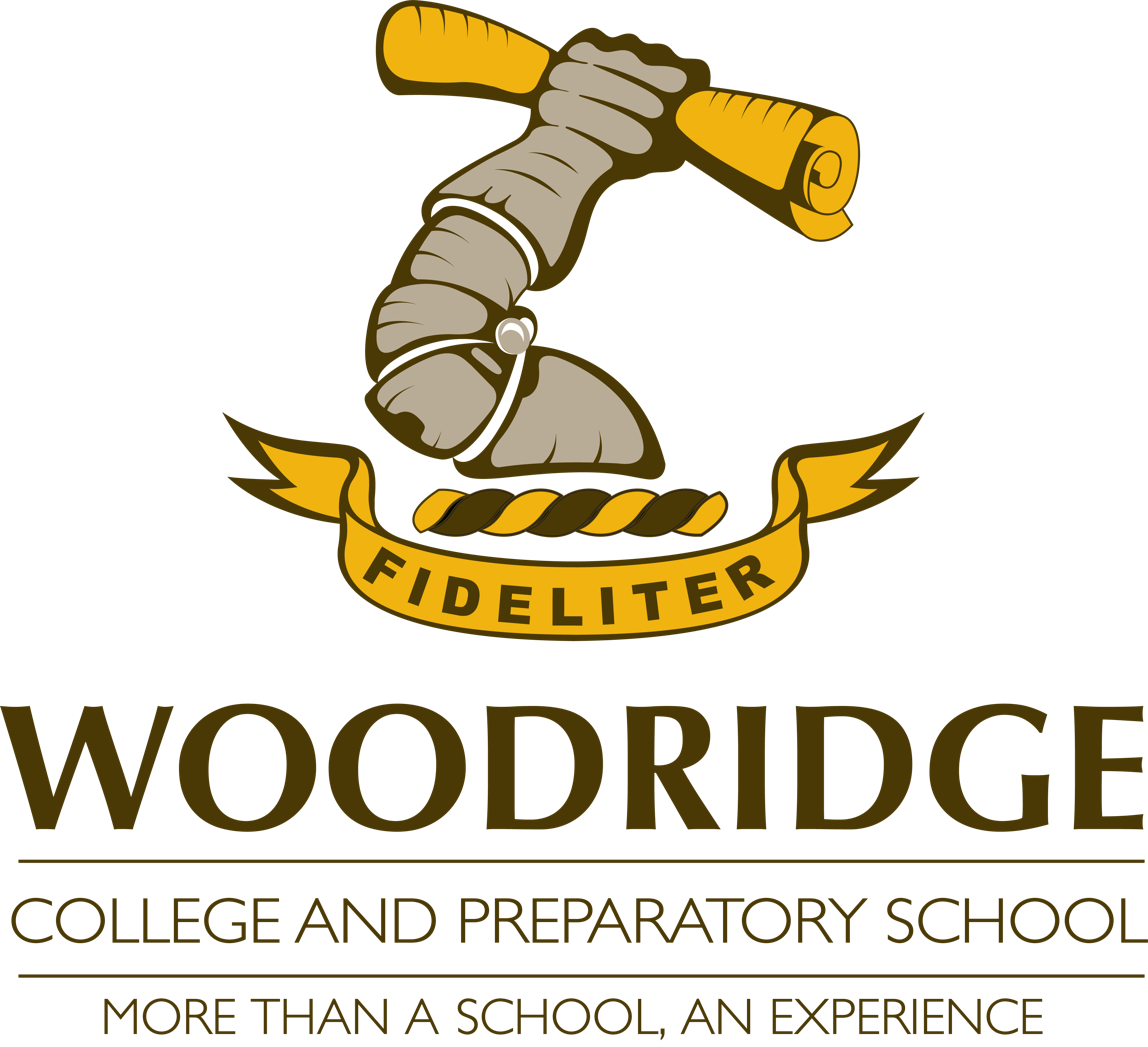
- Thornhill, Eastern Cape; South Africa

Information
- Type: Private & boarding
- Motto: Fideliter (Faithfully)
- Religious affiliation: Christianity
- Established: 1936; 90 years ago
- Headmasters: Luke Hartley & Trevor von Berg
- Exam board: IEB
- Staff: 100 full-time
- Grades: 0000–12
- Gender: Boys & Girls
- Age: 2 to 18
- Enrollment: 800 pupils
- Language: English
- Schedule: 08:00 - 16:30
- Colours: Brown; Yellow; White
- Alumni: Old Woodrigeans
- Website: www.woodridge.co.za

Woodridge College and Preparatory School is a private, co-educational school in the Eastern Cape, South Africa.

Woodridge is situated near the small town of Thornhill, Kouga, halfway between Jeffrey's Bay and Gqeberha (formerly Port Elizabeth). The school offers education to both boys and girls and accommodates both boarders and day scholars.

== Motto ==
The motto of the school is Fideliter, as can be seen on the school emblem, meaning "Faithfully".

== Location ==
It is situated on the edge of the gorge that has been created by Van Stadens River, next to the Van Stadens Bridge.

== History ==
The school was started by the Carter family in 1936, all of whose descendants have attended the school. Originally the school was only a preparatory school, and the college was started during the 1960s. On June 10, 2017, Woodridge experienced a fire that engulfed at least half of the campus.

== Curriculum ==
The school offers the standard schooling under the guidelines of the Independent Schools Association of Southern Africa, and pupils taking their National Senior Certificate write the IEB examinations. Woodridge is also strongly supporting outdoor education, meaning that the students frequently take outdoor excursions and learn outdoors or about the outdoors.

== Sport ==
Woodridge is involved in the sports of rugby, cricket, hockey, star gazing, netball, squash, tennis, bird watching, athletics and water polo. Surf lifesaving is also offered.

Other sports offered are rock climbing, canoeing, and hiking. Outdoor education is offered, which is similar to Outward Bound, although it got its roots more from the Veld en Vlei society in nearby Sedgefield which many Old Woodridgeans used to attend, which was later bought out by the Outward Bound association. The Outward Bound was modelled on the Scottish school Gordonstoun, as was the rating system.

Inter house competitions are held for all sports offered by the school. The Outdoor Education house trophy is considered the most revered of house trophies.

== Notable alumni ==
- Colin Ingram - cricketer
- James Kamte, - golfer
- Jade de Klerk - cricketer
- Mark Rushmere - cricketer
- Riki Wessels - cricketer
- Edith Molikoe - Hockey

== Headmasters ==
The Headmaster of the school is Luke Hartley.

Previous headmasters include:

- 2024–present: Luke Hartley
- 2017-2023: Derek Bradley
- 2014-2017: Simon Crane
- 2005-2014: Craig Neave
- 2002-2004: Ken Ball
- 1997-2001: Guy Norman Pearson
- 1967-1992: Keith Starck

== Religious teachings ==
Woodridge is considered a Christian school, and is a parish of the Anglican church.
