= Mornay Visser =

South African rugby union player (born 1969)

- Born: 30 March 1969 (age 57) Cape Town
- Height: 1.83 m (6 ft 0 in)
- Weight: 100 kg (220 lb)
- School: Paarl Gimnasium
- University: Stellenbosch University

Rugby union career
- Position: Hooker
Provincial / State sides
Years	Team	Apps	(Points)
1993–1997	Western Province	76	
1998–2000	Sharks	25	
Super Rugby
Years	Team	Apps	(Points)
1999–2000	Sharks	23	(5)
International career
Years	Team	Apps	(Points)
1995	South Africa	1	

Mornay Visser (born 30 March 1969) is a South African former rugby union player.

== Playing career ==
Visser matriculated at Paarl Gimnasium and represented Western Province at the annual Craven Week tournaments in 1987 and 1988, captaining the team in 1988 and gained selection for the 1988 South African Schools team. In 1990, he enrolled at the University of Stellenbosch and represented Maties on the rugby field. He made his senior provincial debut for Western Province in 1993 and in 1998, he moved to the Sharks. Visser played one test match for the Springboks, the pre World Cup test against Samoa at Ellis Park, in 1995.

=== Test history ===
No.	Opponents	Results (SA 1st)	Position	Tries	Dates	Venue
1.	Samoa	60–8	Replacement		13 April 1995	Ellis Park, Johannesburg

== See also ==
- List of South Africa national rugby union players – Springbok no. 625
