= Andries Truscott =

South African rugby union footballer (born 1968)

- Born: Jan Andries Truscott; 22 July 1968 (age 58) Alberton, Gauteng, South Africa
- Height: 1.83 m (6 ft 0 in)
- Weight: 108 kg (238 lb)
- School: Grey College, Bloemfontein
- University: University of Pretoria

Rugby union career
- Position: Hooker
Amateur team(s)
Years	Team	Apps	(Points)
- University of Pretoria
Provincial / State sides
Years	Team	Apps	(Points)
1991–93, 96–99	Northern Transvaal		
International career
Years	Team	Apps	(Points)
1992	South Africa		

Johannes Andries Truscott (born 22 July 1968) is a former South African rugby union player.

== Playing career ==
A product off Grey College in Bloemfontein, Truscott represented the Free State Schools team at the annual Craven Week tournament in 1986 and was then selected for the South African Schools team. After school he moved to Transvaal and played for the Transvaal under 20 teams in 1987 and in 1988 he relocated to Northern Transvaal, also playing for the under 20 team. He made his senior provincial debut for Northern Transvaal in 1990.

Truscott toured with the Springboks in 1992 to France and England. He did not play in any test matches for the Springboks but played in four tour matches. In 1993, Truscott received a two-year ban after testing positive for the use of the banned stimulant. Truscott returned during the 1996 season, and represented Northern Transvaal in the inaugural Super 12. He was subsequently included the 1996 Springbok squad for the Tri-Nations, but did not play in any matches.

== See also ==
- List of South Africa national rugby union players – Springbok no. 581
