= Paarl Gimnasium =

Location
- 416 Main Road, Northern Paarl; Paarl, Western Cape; South Africa; 33.7203°S 18.9586°E

Information
- School type: Public & Boarding
- Motto: "Sol Justitae Illustra Nos" "Sun of justice, shine upon us "
- Religious affiliation: Christianity
- Established: 1858; 168 years ago
- School district: District 9
- School number: +27 (021) 872 1541
- Headmaster: Paul Viljoen
- Grades: 8–12
- Gender: 1858-1963 boys Since 1964 coeducational
- Age: 14 to 18
- Enrollment: 1,200 pupils
- Language: Afrikaans
- Schedule: 07:30 - 14:00
- Campus: Urban campus
- Campus type: Suburban
- Colours: Gold; Green; Maroon
- Nickname: Paarl Gim
- Rivals: Afrikaanse Hoër Seunskool; Paarl Boys' High School; Paul Roos Gymnasium
- Accreditation: Western Cape Education Department
- Newspaper: Sollie
- Website: http://www.paarlgim.co.za

Paarl Gimnasium is a public Afrikaans medium co-educational high school situated in the city of Paarl in the Western Cape province of South Africa.

== History ==
Rev. van der Lingen founded the school in the centre of town in 1858. The school has produced some of South Africa's top rugby union players, including Schalk Burger, Jean De Villiers, Marius Joubert, Handré Pollard and De Wet Barry. Other alumni include the theologian Stephanus Jacobus du Toit and politician Liezl van der Merwe.

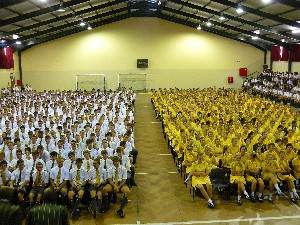
The view of the School Hall during assembly

The primary school section of Gimnasium was founded in 1858 as a Dutch Christian school for boys, with the high school being founded much later. In the mid-1930s the school's language of education shifted to Afrikaans. After the high school section was completed the school enrolled its first female student.

Paarl Gimnasium High School has a large sporting program and takes part in the interschools tournament against Paarl Boys' High School, an event which attracts tens of thousands of spectators every year. In August 2024 the netball team won the Kay Motsepe league and earned a spot to represent South Africa in Singapore with Leifo-Iziko Secondary School from Petsana Reitz, Free State. In November 2024 the netball team took first place and won gold in Singapore while Leifo-Iziko took the third place, earning a bronze.

== Notable alumni ==
=== Springbok Rugby ===
Name	Test debut	Springbok number
Japie le Roux	10/10/1906	94
Boy de Villiers	17/11/1906	95
Pietie le Roux	24/11/1906	103
Steve Joubert	24/11/1906	110
Gerald Thompson	23/11/1912	142
Attie van Heerden	13/08/1921	152
Pierre de Villiers	30/06/1928	195
Xander van der Westhuizen	21/07/1928	203
Manus de Jongh	18/08/1928	205
PK Morkel	01/09/1928	211
Jan Pickard	19/09/1953	301
Hugo van Zyl	26/07/1958	340
Wynand Mans	10/04/1965	398
Schalk Burger (snr)	02/06/1984	535
Kobus Burger	26/08/1989	552
Kobus Wiese	26/06/1993	585
Balie Swart	31/07/1993	595
Mornay Visser	13/04/1995	625
Pieter Rossouw	28/06/1997	652
De Wet Barry	10/06/2000	690
Louis Koen	08/07/2000	693
Chris Rossouw	no tests	699
Marius Joubert	21/07/2001	711
Jean de Villiers	09/11/2002	735
Schalk Burger (jnr)	24/10/2003	754
Ashley Johnson	23/07/2011	810
Lourens Adriaanse	23/11/2013	853
Handré Pollard	28/06/2014	857
Louis Schreuder	02/12/2017	891
Grant Williams	09/07/2022	929

=== Other ===
- Marciel Hopkins, model and Boer Soek 'n Vrou presenter
- Marguerite Wheatley, actress
- Perlé van Schalkwyk, businesswoman and owner of the Lollipop Lounge
- Liezl van der Merwe, Member of the National Assembly of South Africa
- Mandy Rossouw, journalist
- Martelize Brink, author and radio presenter
- Kiewiet, 2002 Alumnus & Draadspanner
