= Christo Ferreira =

South Africa international rugby union player

- Born: Christoffel Ferreira; 28 August 1960 (age 66) Welkom, Free State, South Africa
- Height: 1.71 m (5 ft 7 in)
- Weight: 73 kg (161 lb)
- School: Welkom-Gimnasium, Welkom
- University: University of the Free State

Rugby union career
- Position: Scrumhalf
Provincial / State sides
Years	Team	Apps	(Points)
1981–1986	Free State	45	
1987–1988	Northern Transvaal	14	
International career
Years	Team	Apps	(Points)
1986	South Africa	2	

Christoffel 'Christo' Ferreira (born 28 August 1960) is a former South African rugby union player.

== Playing career ==
Ferreira played for Free State and Northern Transvaal in the South African provincial competitions and also for the Springboks. He made his test debut against the visiting New Zealand Cavaliers on 10 May 1986 at Newlands in Cape Town. He played in the first two tests against the Cavaliers and was then replaced by Garth Wright for the last two tests.

=== Test history ===
No.	Opponents	Results (RSA 1st)	Position	Tries	Dates	Venue
1.	New Zealand Cavaliers	21–15	Scrumhalf		10 May 1986	Newlands, Cape Town
2.	New Zealand Cavaliers	18–19	Scrumhalf		17 May 1986	Kings Park, Durban

== See also ==
- List of South Africa national rugby union players – Springbok no. 543
