= 1994 England rugby union tour of South Africa =

Series of rugby matches played by the English national team

Summary
P	W	D	L
Total
8	3	0	5
Test match
2	1	0	1
Opponent
P	W	D	L
South Africa
2	1	0	1

Tour chronology
- ← Australia and Fiji 1991 Argentina & Australia 1997 →

== Fixtures and results ==
Scores and results list England's points tally first.

Opposing Team	For	Against	Date	Venue	Status
Orange Free State	11	22	11 May 1994	Springbok Park, Bloemfontein	Tour Match
Natal	6	21	21 May 1994	Kings Park Stadium, Durban	Tour Match
Western Transvaal	26	24	25 May 1994	Olën Park, Potchefstroom	Tour Match
Transvaal	21	24	28 May 1994	Ellis Park Johannesburg	Tour Match
South Africa 'A'	16	19	31 May 1994	Hoffe Park, Kimberley	Tour Match
South Africa	32	15	4 June 1994	Loftus Versfeld, Pretoria	First Test
Eastern Province	31	13	7 June 1994	Boet Erasmus Stadium, Port Elizabeth	Tour Match
South Africa	9	27	11 June 1994	Newlands, Cape Town	Second test

== Touring party ==
- Manager: Jack Rowell
- Coaches: Dick Best, Les Cusworth
- Captain: Will Carling

Player	Position	Club	Age	Caps
Paul Hull	Full back	Bristol	25	0
David Pears	Full back	Harlequins	26	4
Adedayo Adebayo	Wing	Bath	23	0
Damian Hopley	Wing	Wasps	24	0
Rory Underwood	Wing	Leicester	30	65
Tony Underwood	Wing	Leicester	25	8
Mike Catt	Centre	Bath	22	0
Will Carling	Centre	Harlequins	28	47
Phil de Glanville	Centre	Bath	25	7
Stuart Potter	Centre	Leicester	26	0
Rob Andrew	Fly Half	Wasps	26	57
Stuart Barnes	Fly Half	Bath	25	10
Steve Bates	Scrum half	Wasps	31	1
Dewi Morris	Scrum half	Orrell	30	17
Jason Leonard	Prop	Harlequins	25	30
John Mallett	Prop	Bath	25	0
Graham Rowntree	Prop	Leicester	23	0
Victor Ubogu	Prop	Bath	29	7
Graham Dawe	Hooker	Bath	34	4
Brian Moore	Hooker	Harlequins	32	50
Martin Bayfield	Lock	Northampton	27	14
Martin Johnson	Lock	Leicester	24	6
Matt Poole	Lock	Leicester	25	0
Nigel Redman	Lock	Bath	29	16
Ben Clarke	Back Row	Bath	26	9
Lawrence Dallaglio	Back Row	Wasps	21	0
Dean Ryan	Back Row	Wasps	27	3
Steve Ojomoh	Back Row	Bath	23	2
Dean Richards	Back Row	Leicester	30	36
Tim Rodber	Back Row	Northampton	24	6

== Matches ==
=== First test ===
4 June 1994
15:45 SAST (UTC+02)

South Africa	(6) 15 - 32 (23)	England
Pen: Joubert (5)		Try: Clarke; Andrew; Con: Andrew (2); Pen: Andrew (5); Drop: Andrew

Loftus Versfeld, Pretoria
Attendance: 51,000
Referee: Colin Hawke (New Zealand)

FB	15	André Joubert
RW	14	James Small
OC	13	Pieter Muller
IC	12	Brendan Venter
LW	11	Chester Williams
FH	10	Hennie le Roux
SH	9	Joost van der Westhuizen
N8	8	Tiaan Strauss
BF	7	Fritz Van Heerden
OF	6	François Pienaar (c)
RL	5	Steve Atherton
LL	4	Hannes Strydom
TP	3	Balie Swart
HK	2	John Allan
LP	1	Ollie le Roux
Replacements:
CE	16	F.A. Meiring
FH	17	Joel Stransky
SH	18	Johan Roux
HK	19	James Dalton
FL	20	Ruben Kruger
PR	21	Johan Le Roux
Coach:
(South Africa) Ian McIntosh

FB	15	Paul Hull
RW	14	Tony Underwood
OC	13	Will Carling (c)
IC	12	Phil de Glanville
LW	11	Rory Underwood
FH	10	Rob Andrew
SH	9	Dewi Morris
N8	8	Dean Richards
OF	7	Ben Clarke
BF	6	Tim Rodber
RL	5	Nigel Redman
LL	4	Martin Bayfield
TP	3	Victor Ubogu
HK	2	Brian Moore
LP	1	Jason Leonard
Replacements:
FL	16	Steve Ojomoh	Substituted in
FB	17	Jon Callard
FH	18	Mike Catt
SH	19	Steve Bates
HK	20	Graham Dawe
PR	21	Graham Rowntree
Coach:
(England) Jack Rowell

Notes:

- Hennie le Roux, Fritz van Heerden, Brendan Venter (all South Africa) and Paul Hull (England) made their international test debuts.

=== Second test ===
11 June 1994
15:30 SAST (UTC+02)

South Africa	(3) 27 - 9 (3)	England
Try: le Roux; Joubert; Con: Joubert; Pen: le Roux (3); Joubert (2)		Pen: Andrew (3)

Newlands Stadium, Cape Town
Attendance: 45,000
Referee: Colin Hawke (New Zealand)

FB	15	André Joubert
RW	14	James Small
OC	13	Pieter Muller
IC	12	Brendan Venter
LW	11	Chester Williams
FH	10	Hennie le Roux
SH	9	Johan Roux
N8	8	Adriaan Richter
BF	7	Ian MacDonald
OF	6	François Pienaar (c)
RL	5	Steve Atherton
LL	4	Mark Andrews
TP	3	Johan Le Roux
HK	2	John Allan
LP	1	Balie Swart
Replacements:
SH	16	Joost van der Westhuizen	Substituted in
FL	17	Fritz Van Heerden	Substituted in
CE	18	Jannie Claassens
FH	19	Lance Sherrell
PR	20	Japie Barnard
HK	21	James Dalton
Coach:
(South Africa) Ian McIntosh

FB	15	Paul Hull
RW	14	Tony Underwood
OC	13	Will Carling (c)
IC	12	Phil de Glanville
LW	11	Rory Underwood
FH	10	Rob Andrew
SH	9	Dewi Morris
N8	8	Ben Clarke
OF	7	Steve Ojomoh
BF	6	Tim Rodber
RL	5	Nigel Redman
LL	4	Martin Bayfield
TP	3	Victor Ubogu
HK	2	Brian Moore
LP	1	Jason Leonard
Replacements:
CE	16	Mike Catt
FH	17	Stuart Barnes
SH	18	Steve Bates
PR	19	John Mallett
HK	20	Graham Dawe
FL	21	Lawrence Dallaglio
Coach:
(England) Jack Rowell

Notes:

- Mark Andrews, Johan Le Roux and Johan Roux (all South Africa) made their international test debuts.

== In popular culture ==
- The first test at Loftus Versfeld was referenced in the 2009 film Invictus.

== See also ==
- History of rugby union matches between England and South Africa
