= 1996 Currie Cup =

Domestic rugby union competition

- Countries: South Africa
- Date: 30 May – 24 October 1996
- Champions: Natal (4th title)
- Runners-up: Transvaal
- Matches played: 91

The 1996 Currie Cup was the 58th season of the Currie Cup, South Africa's premier domestic rugby union competition, since it started in 1889. The competition was known as the Bankfin Currie Cup for sponsorship reasons and was contested from 30 May to 24 October 1996. This was also the first season since the advent of professionalism in South African rugby union, which led to a major restructuring in several facets of the sport. The number of provincial unions were reduced from 22 to 14, all of which participated in a single Currie Cup tournament.

The competition was won by the Natal for the fourth time in their history; they beat the Transvaal 33–15 in the final played on 24 October 1996.

== Competition rules and information ==
There were fourteen participating teams in the 1996 Currie Cup. These teams were divided into two sections, Section A and Section B. Teams played all the other teams in their section twice over the course of the season, once at home and once away.

Teams received two points for a win and one point for a draw. The top four teams in each section qualified for the title play-offs. In the quarter finals, the teams that finished first in each section had home advantage against the teams that finished fourth in the other section, while the teams that finished second in each section had home advantage against the teams that finished third in the other section. The winners of these quarter finals advanced to the semi-finals and semi-final winners advanced to the final, in both rounds at the home venue of the higher-placed team.

== Teams ==
Location of teams in the 1996 Currie Cup
Section A
Section B

=== Team Listing ===
1996 Currie Cup teams
Team	Sponsored Name	Stadium/s	Sponsored Name
Boland	Boland	Boland Stadium, Wellington	Boland Stadium
Border	Border	Waverley Park, East London	Waverley Park
Eastern Province	Eastern Province	PE Stadium, Port Elizabeth	PE Stadium
Eastern Transvaal	Eastern Transvaal	Bosman Stadium, Brakpan	Bosman Stadium
Free State	Free State	Free State Stadium, Bloemfontein	Vodacom Park
Griqualand West	Griqualand West	Griqua Park, Kimberley	ABSA Park
Natal	Natal	University of Natal, Durban	University of Natal
Northern Free State	Northern Free State	North West Stadium, Welkom	North West Stadium
Northern Transvaal	Northern Transvaal	Loftus Versfeld, Pretoria	Minolta Loftus
South Eastern Transvaal	South Eastern Transvaal	Johann van Riebeeck Stadium, Witbank	Johann van Riebeeck Stadium
South Western Districts	South Western Districts	Outeniqua Park, George	Outeniqua Park
South Western Districts	South Western Districts	REC Ground, Oudtshoorn	REC Ground
South Western Districts	South Western Districts	Van Riebeeck Stadium, Mossel Bay	Van Riebeeck Stadium
Transvaal	Transvaal	Ellis Park Stadium, Johannesburg	Ellis Park Stadium
Western Province	Norwich Western Province	Newlands Stadium, Cape Town	Fedsure Park Newlands
Western Transvaal	Western Transvaal	Olën Park, Potchefstroom	Olën Park

=== Changes from 1995 ===
Following the 1995 Rugby World Cup, rugby union was declared in a professional sport in South Africa. This caused a major restructuring in the rugby unions, which saw the total number of unions reduced from 22 to 14. All of these teams played in the 1996 Currie Cup, which was increased from 6 teams to 14.

Promoted teams:

- Boland
- Border
- Eastern Transvaal
- Griqualand West
- Western Transvaal
- Northern Free State
- South Eastern Transvaal
- South Western Districts

Dissolved teams:

- Eastern Free State (absorbed into Northern Free State)
- Far North (absorbed into Northern Transvaal)
- Lowveld (absorbed into South Eastern Transvaal)
- North Eastern Cape (absorbed into Border and Eastern Province)
- North Western Cape (absorbed into Griqualand West)
- Northern Natal (absorbed into Natal)
- Stellaland (absorbed into Western Transvaal)
- Vaal Triangle (absorbed into Eastern Transvaal)

== Log ==
The final log of the round-robin stage of the 1996 Currie Cup: (Note: The log on the South African Rugby Union's page includes title play-off results.)

Section A
Pos	Team	Pld	W	D	L	PF	PA	PD	TF	TA	Pts	Qualification
1	Natal	12	12	0	0	673	212	+461	97	20	24	quarter-finals
2	Transvaal	12	9	1	2	456	252	+204	53	25	19	quarter-finals
3	South Eastern Transvaal	12	6	2	4	292	363	−71	30	42	14	quarter-finals
4	Boland	12	6	0	6	250	308	−58	25	35	12	quarter-finals
5	Eastern Province	12	3	1	8	245	341	−96	25	38	7	
6	Border	12	2	2	8	244	422	−178	26	50	6	
7	Western Transvaal	12	1	0	11	268	530	−262	22	68	2	

Rules for classification: 2 points for a win; 1 point for a draw

Section B
Pos	Team	Pld	W	D	L	PF	PA	PD	TF	TA	Pts	Qualification
1	Northern Transvaal	12	11	0	1	707	207	+500	93	23	22	quarter-finals
2	Free State	12	9	1	2	558	280	+278	75	28	19	quarter-finals
3	Western Province	12	8	0	4	537	249	+288	74	27	16	quarter-finals
4	Griqualand West	12	7	1	4	437	322	+115	58	31	15	quarter-finals
5	Eastern Transvaal	12	3	0	9	281	552	−271	34	77	6	
6	Northern Free State	12	3	0	9	243	529	−286	24	73	6	
7	South Western Districts	12	0	0	12	216	840	−624	23	122	0	

Rules for classification: 2 points for a win; 1 point for a draw

== Matches ==
The following matches were played in the 1996 Currie Cup: (Note: There are some discrepancies. The match dates all fall on Thursdays, which is unlikely, since matches are generally played on Saturdays. It is also unlikely that the Sharks would have played all their matches at the University of Natal, rather than their traditional home, the Kings Park Stadium.)

=== Section A ===
==== Round one ====
30 May 1996	Border	20–53	Transvaal	Waverley Park, East London
		Scoreboard

30 May 1996	South Eastern Transvaal	32–18	Eastern Province	Johann van Riebeeck Stadium, Witbank
		Scoreboard

30 May 1996	Western Transvaal	13–62	Natal	Olën Park, Potchefstroom
		Scoreboard

Bye/s: Boland

==== Round two ====
6 June 1996	Boland	31–10	Border	Boland Stadium, Wellington
		Scoreboard

6 June 1996	Natal	90–9	South Eastern Transvaal	University of Natal, Durban
		Scoreboard

6 June 1996	Transvaal	98–12	Western Transvaal	Ellis Park Stadium, Johannesburg
		Scoreboard

Bye/s: Eastern Province

==== Round three ====
13 June 1996	Eastern Province	36–23	Boland	PE Stadium, Port Elizabeth
		Scoreboard

13 June 1996	Natal	34–24	Transvaal	University of Natal, Durban
		Scoreboard

13 June 1996	South Eastern Transvaal	41–22	Border	Johann van Riebeeck Stadium, Witbank
		Scoreboard

Bye/s: Western Transvaal

==== Round four ====
20 June 1996	Boland	23–13	South Eastern Transvaal	Boland Stadium, Wellington
		Scoreboard

20 June 1996	Border	43–37	Western Transvaal	Waverley Park, East London
		Scoreboard

20 June 1996	Transvaal	22–14	Eastern Province	Ellis Park Stadium, Johannesburg
		Scoreboard

Bye/s: Natal

==== Round Five ====
27 June 1996	Eastern Province	21–60	Natal	PE Stadium, Port Elizabeth
		Scoreboard

27 June 1996	South Eastern Transvaal	15–15	Transvaal	Johann van Riebeeck Stadium, Witbank
		Scoreboard

27 June 1996	Western Transvaal	22–32	Boland	Olën Park, Potchefstroom
		Scoreboard

Bye/s: Border

==== Round Six ====
4 July 1996	Boland	12–36	Natal	Boland Stadium, Wellington
		Scoreboard

4 July 1996	Border	19–19	Eastern Province	Waverley Park, East London
		Scoreboard

4 July 1996	Western Transvaal	31–40	South Eastern Transvaal	Olën Park, Potchefstroom
		Scoreboard

Bye/s: Transvaal

==== Round Seven ====
11 July 1996	Eastern Province	25–27	Western Transvaal	PE Stadium, Port Elizabeth
		Scoreboard

11 July 1996	Natal	64–17	Border	University of Natal, Durban
		Scoreboard

11 July 1996	Transvaal	41–10	Boland	Ellis Park Stadium, Johannesburg
		Scoreboard

Bye/s: South Eastern Transvaal

==== Round Eight ====
18 July 1996	Eastern Province	16–26	South Eastern Transvaal	PE Stadium, Port Elizabeth
		Scoreboard

18 July 1996	Natal	71–15	Western Transvaal	University of Natal, Durban
		Scoreboard

18 July 1996	Transvaal	32–12	Border	Ellis Park Stadium, Johannesburg
		Scoreboard

Bye/s: Boland

==== Round Nine ====
25 July 1996	Border	17–29	Boland	Waverley Park, East London
		Scoreboard

25 July 1996	South Eastern Transvaal	25–59	Natal	Johann van Riebeeck Stadium, Witbank
		Scoreboard

25 July 1996	Western Transvaal	28–53	Transvaal	Olën Park, Potchefstroom
		Scoreboard

Bye/s: Eastern Province

==== Round Ten ====
5 September 1996	Boland	16–11	Western Transvaal	Boland Stadium, Wellington
		Scoreboard

5 September 1996	Natal	53–9	Eastern Province	University of Natal, Durban
		Scoreboard

5 September 1996	Transvaal	29–26	South Eastern Transvaal	Ellis Park Stadium, Johannesburg
		Scoreboard

Bye/s: Border

==== Round Eleven ====
12 September 1996	Eastern Province	20–23	Transvaal	PE Stadium, Port Elizabeth
		Scoreboard

12 September 1996	South Eastern Transvaal	22–19	Boland	Johann van Riebeeck Stadium, Witbank
		Scoreboard

12 September 1996	Western Transvaal	26–33	Border	Olën Park, Potchefstroom
		Scoreboard

Bye/s: Natal

==== Round Twelve ====
19 September 1996	Boland	18–17	Eastern Province	Boland Stadium, Wellington
		Scoreboard

19 September 1996	Border	20–20	South Eastern Transvaal	Waverley Park, East London
		Scoreboard

19 September 1996	Transvaal	36–37	Natal	Ellis Park Stadium, Johannesburg
		Scoreboard

Bye/s: Western Transvaal

==== Round Thirteen ====
26 September 1996	Eastern Province	16–13	Border	PE Stadium, Port Elizabeth
		Scoreboard

26 September 1996	Natal	53–13	Boland	University of Natal, Durban
		Scoreboard

26 September 1996	South Eastern Transvaal	23–21	Western Transvaal	Johann van Riebeeck Stadium, Witbank
		Scoreboard

Bye/s: Transvaal

==== Round Fourteen ====
3 October 1996	Boland	24–30	Transvaal	Boland Stadium, Wellington
		Scoreboard

3 October 1996	Border	18–54	Natal	Waverley Park, East London
		Scoreboard

3 October 1996	Western Transvaal	25–34	Eastern Province	Olën Park, Potchefstroom
		Scoreboard

Bye/s: South Eastern Transvaal

=== Section B ===
==== Round one ====
30 May 1996	Free State	83–28	Eastern Transvaal	Free State Stadium, Bloemfontein
		Scoreboard

30 May 1996	Northern Transvaal	47–17	Griqualand West	Loftus Versfeld, Pretoria
	Try: Dawie du Toit, Andre Snyman, Jannie Claassens (2), Hannes Venter; Con: Theo van Rensburg (2); Pen: Theo van Rensburg (2), Dawie du Toit (4)	Scoreboard	Try: Luther Bakkes, Boeta Wessels; Con: Edrich Lubbe (2); Pen: Edrich Lubbe

30 May 1996	Western Province	73–12	Northern Free State	Newlands Stadium, Cape Town
		Scoreboard

Bye/s: South Western Districts

==== Round two ====
5 June 1996	Griqualand West	59–38	South Western Districts	Griqua Park, Kimberley
		Scoreboard

6 June 1996	Northern Free State	8–53	Northern Transvaal	North West Stadium, Welkom
	Try: Leon van Zyl; Pen: Tommie de Beer	Scoreboard	Try: Jannie Claassens (3), Jannie Brooks (2), Schutte Bekker, Dawie Du Toit; Con: Theo van Rensburg (6); Pen: Theo van Rensburg (2)

6 June 1996	Western Province	13–24	Free State	Newlands Stadium, Cape Town
		Scoreboard

Bye/s: Eastern Transvaal

==== Round three ====
13 June 1996	Griqualand West	60–29	Eastern Transvaal	Griqua Park, Kimberley
		Scoreboard

13 June 1996	Northern Transvaal	51–20	Western Province	Loftus Versfeld, Pretoria
	Try: Hannes Venter (2), Chivago Breda, Ruben Kruger, Krynauw Otto, Penalty try Con: Theo van Rensburg (6); Pen: Theo van Rensburg (3)	Scoreboard	Try: Joel Stransky, Rhys Botha; Con: Joel Stransky (2); Pen: Joel Stransky (2)

13 June 1996	South Western Districts	14–16	Northern Free State	Van Riebeeck Stadium, Mossel Bay
		Scoreboard

Bye/s: Free State

==== Round four ====
19 June 1996	Northern Free State	22–32	Griqualand West	North West Stadium, Welkom
		Scoreboard

20 June 1996	Eastern Transvaal	65–17	South Western Districts	Bosman Stadium, Brakpan
		Scoreboard

20 June 1996	Free State	27–25	Northern Transvaal	Free State Stadium, Bloemfontein
	Try: Werner Swanepoel, Charl van Rensburg; Con: MJ Smith; Pen: MJ Smith (5)	Scoreboard	Try: Andre Snyman, Hannes Venter, Henry Tromp; Con: Rynhardt van As (2); Pen: Theo van Rensburg (2)

Bye/s: Western Province

==== Round Five ====
27 June 1996	Northern Transvaal	80–22	Eastern Transvaal	Loftus Versfeld, Pretoria
	Try: Hannes Venter (2), Chivago Breda (2), Derick Grobbelaar, Conrad Breytenbach, Adriaan Richter, Ralf Schroeder, Dawie du Toit, Andre Snyman, Theo van Rensburg; Con: Theo van Rensburg (8); Pen: Theo van Rensburg (3)	Scoreboard	Try: AC Prinsloo, Jaco Viljoen, Johnny Fourie; Con: Jaco Viljoen (2); Pen: Jaco Viljoen

27 June 1996	South Western Districts	20–53	Free State	Van Riebeeck Stadium, Mossel Bay
		Scoreboard

Bye/s: Griqualand West, Northern Free State, Western Province

==== Round Six ====
4 July 1996	Eastern Transvaal	15–6	Northern Free State	Bosman Stadium, Brakpan
		Scoreboard

4 July 1996	Free State	12–25	Griqualand West	Free State Stadium, Bloemfontein
		Scoreboard

4 July 1996	Western Province	64–13	South Western Districts	Newlands Stadium, Cape Town
		Scoreboard

Bye/s: Northern Transvaal

==== Round Seven ====
11 July 1996	Griqualand West	17–33	Western Province	Griqua Park, Kimberley
		Scoreboard

11 July 1996	Northern Free State	25–65	Free State	North West Stadium, Welkom
		Scoreboard

11 July 1996	South Western Districts	13–56	Northern Transvaal	REC Ground, Oudtshoorn
	Try: Jerome Muller; Con: Jurie Coetzee; Pen: Jurie Coetzee (2)	Scoreboard	Try: Chivago Breda, Conrad Stoltz, Andre Snyman, Adriaan Richter, Ralf Schroder, Dewald Kamffer, Penalty try Con: Theo van Rensburg (6); Pen: Theo van Rensburg (3)

Bye/s: Eastern Transvaal

==== Round Eight ====
18 July 1996	Eastern Transvaal	21–44	Free State	Bosman Stadium, Brakpan
		Scoreboard

18 July 1996	Griqualand West	15–42	Northern Transvaal	Griqua Park, Kimberley
	Try: Wessels, Phillip Smith; Con: Franco Smith; Pen: Franco Smith	Scoreboard	Try: Thys Stoltz, Hannes Venter, Dawie Du Toit (2), Adriaan Richter; Con: Jannie Kruger (4); Pen: Jannie Kruger (2); Drop: Jannie Kruger

18 July 1996	Northern Free State	20–56	Western Province	North West Stadium, Welkom
		Scoreboard

Bye/s: South Western Districts

==== Round Nine ====
25 July 1996	Northern Transvaal	56–7	Northern Free State	Loftus Versfeld, Pretoria
	Try: FA Meiring (3), Nickie van der Walt, Krynauw Otto, Schutte Bekker, Conrad Breytenbach, Henry Tromp; Con: Jannie Kruger (5); Pen: Jannie Kruger (2)	Scoreboard	Try: Thys Badenhorst; Con: Len van Riek

25 July 1996	South Western Districts	20–62	Griqualand West	REC Ground, Oudtshoorn
		Scoreboard

25 July 1996	Western Province	58–7	Eastern Transvaal	Newlands Stadium, Cape Town
		Scoreboard

Bye/s: Free State

==== Round Ten ====
21 August 1996	Eastern Transvaal	14–51	Western Province	Bosman Stadium, Brakpan
		Scoreboard

Bye/s: Northern Transvaal, Free State, Griqualand West, Northern Free State, South Western Districts

==== Round Eleven ====
4 September 1996	Northern Free State	67–19	South Western Districts	North West Stadium, Welkom
		Scoreboard

5 September 1996	Eastern Transvaal	24–72	Northern Transvaal	Bosman Stadium, Brakpan
	Try: Jaco Viljoen (2), Eugene Meyer; Con: Jaco Viljoen (2); Pen: Jaco Viljoen	Scoreboard	Try: Thys Stoltz, Nicky van der Walt, Willie Enslin, Dawie du Toit, Hannes Venter (2), Conrad Breytenbach (2), FA Meiring (2); Con: Rynhard van As (8); Pen: Rynhard van As (2)

5 September 1996	Free State	25–16	Western Province	Free State Stadium, Bloemfontein
		Scoreboard

Bye/s: Griqualand West

==== Round Twelve ====
11 September 1996	Griqualand West	78–10	Northern Free State	Griqua Park, Kimberley
		Scoreboard

12 September 1996	Northern Transvaal	51–30	Free State	Loftus Versfeld, Pretoria
	Try: Joost van der Westhuizen (2), Hannes Venter, Danie van Schalkwyk, Ruben Kruger; Con: Lance Sherrell (4); Pen: Lance Sherrell (6)	Scoreboard	Try: Braam Els, Helgard Muller, Charl Marais; Con: MJ Smith (2), Andre Fourie; Pen: MJ Smith (3)

12 September 1996	South Western Districts	20–31	Eastern Transvaal	Outeniqua Park, George
		Scoreboard

Bye/s: Western Province

==== Round Thirteen ====
19 September 1996	Eastern Transvaal	11–28	Griqualand West	Bosman Stadium, Brakpan
		Scoreboard

19 September 1996	Free State	113–11	South Western Districts	Free State Stadium, Bloemfontein
		Scoreboard

19 September 1996	Western Province	16–27	Northern Transvaal	Newlands Stadium, Cape Town
	Try: Jaco Taute, Joggie Viljoen; Pen: Louis Koen (2)	Scoreboard	Try: Theo van Rensburg, Lourens Campher, FA Meiring; Con: Lance Sherrell (3); Pen: Lance Sherrell (2)

Bye/s: Northern Free State

==== Round Fourteen ====
25 September 1996	Northern Free State	33–14	Eastern Transvaal	North West Stadium, Welkom
		Scoreboard

26 September 1996	Griqualand West	28–28	Free State	Griqua Park, Kimberley
		Scoreboard

26 September 1996	South Western Districts	23–107	Western Province	Van Riebeeck Stadium, Mossel Bay
		Scoreboard

Bye/s: Northern Transvaal

==== Round Fifteen ====
3 October 1996	Free State	54–17	Northern Free State	Free State Stadium, Bloemfontein
		Scoreboard

3 October 1996	Northern Transvaal	147–8	South Western Districts	Pietersburg
	Try: Kobus Engelbrecht, FA Meiring, Jacques Olivier (7), Andre Snyman (3), Hannes Venter (2), Lance Sherrell (2), Joost van der Westhuizen (2), Schutte Bekker (2), Willie Enslin, Lourens Campher, Conrad Breytenbach; Con: Lance Sherrell (14), Kobus Engelbrecht (2)	Scoreboard	Try: Paul Treu; Pen: Jurie Coetzee	Attendance: 6000

3 October 1996	Western Province	30–16	Griqualand West	Newlands Stadium, Cape Town
		Scoreboard

Bye/s: Eastern Transvaal

=== Title play-offs ===
==== Quarter-finals ====
9 October 1996	Free State	21–3	South Eastern Transvaal	Free State Stadium, Bloemfontein
		Scoreboard

10 October 1996	Natal	51–3	Griqualand West	University of Natal, Durban
		Scoreboard

9 October 1996	Northern Transvaal	55–23	Boland	Loftus Versfeld, Pretoria
	Try: Joost van der Westhuizen, Henry Tromp, Krynauw Otto, Hannes Venter, FA Meiring, Kobus Engelbrecht, Willie Enslin; Con: Lance Sherrell (4); Pen: Lance Sherrell (4)	Scoreboard	Try: Johnny Trytsman, Elmo Wolfaardt; Con: Francois Horn (2); Pen: Francois Horn (3)	Attendance: 20000

This was the 100th match for FA Meiring.

10 October 1996	Transvaal	56–22	Western Province	Ellis Park Stadium, Johannesburg
		Scoreboard

==== Semi-finals ====
17 October 1996	Natal	35–20	Free State	University of Natal, Durban
		Scoreboard

17 October 1996	Northern Transvaal	21–31	Transvaal	Loftus Versfeld, Pretoria
	Try: Jacques Olivier, Penalty try Con: Lance Sherrell; Pen: Lance Sherrell (3)	Scoreboard	Try: Gavin Lawless, Japie Mulder, Rudolph Straeuli; Con: Gavin Lawless (2); Pen: Gavin Lawless (3); Drop: Hennie le Roux

==== Final ====
24 October 1996	Transvaal	15–33	Natal	Ellis Park Stadium, Johannesburg
		Scoreboard

== Honours ==
The honour roll for the 1996 Currie Cup was:

1996 Currie Cup Honours
Champions:	Natal (4th title)
