= 1994 South Africa rugby union tour of Britain and Ireland =

- Coach: Kitch Christie
- Tour captain: Francois Pienaar
- Top point scorer: Andre Joubert (75)
- Top try scorer: Andre Joubert (6)
- Top test point scorer: Andre Joubert (14)
- Top test try scorer: Joost van der Westhuizen (2) Chester Williams (2) Rudolf Straeuli (2)
Summary
P	W	D	L
Total
13	11	0	2
Test match
2	2	0	0
Opponent
P	W	D	L
Scotland
1	1	0	0
Wales
1	1	0	0

The 1994 South Africa rugby union tour of Britain and Ireland was a series of matches played in October and November 1994 in Britain and Ireland by South Africa national rugby union team. The Springboks played two Test matches on the thirteen match tour and won both.

== Touring party ==
- Coach: Kitch Christie
- Assistant coach: Gysie Pienaar
- Manager: Jannie Engelbrecht

Name	Position	Province	Notes
Andre Joubert	Fullback	Natal	
Gavin Johnson	Fullback	Transvaal	
Pieter Hendriks	Wing	Transvaal	
Chester Williams	Wing	Western Province	
Jacques Olivier	Wing	Northern Transvaal	
Chris Badenhorst	Wing	Free State	
Cabous van der Westhuizen	Wing	Natal	Replacement for C. Badenhorst
Brendan Venter	Centre	Free State	
Japie Mulder	Centre	Transvaal	
Tinus Linee	Centre	Western Province	
Pieter Muller	Centre	Natal	
Helgard Muller	Centre	Free State	Replacement for B. Venter
Jannie Claassens	Center	Northern Transvaal	Replacement for T. Linee
Joel Stransky	Fly-half	Western Province	
Hennie le Roux	Fly-half	Transvaal	
Joost van der Westhuizen	Scrum-half	Northern Transvaal	
Kevin Putt	Scrum-half	Natal	
Os du Randt	Prop	Free State	
Tommie Laubscher	Prop	Western Province	
Balie Swart	Prop	Transvaal	
Ian Hattingh	Prop	Transvaal	
Uli Schmidt	Hooker	Transvaal	
James Dalton	Hooker	Transvaal	
Mark Andrews	Lock	Natal	
Drikus Hattingh	Lock	Northern Transvaal	
Phillip Schutte	Lock	Transvaal	
Kobus Wiese	Lock	Transvaal	
Krynauw Otto	Lock	Northern Transvaal	Replacement for D. Hattingh
Francois Pienaar (c)	Flanker	Transvaal	
Ruben Kruger	Flanker	Northern Transvaal	
Rudolf Straeuli	Flanker	Transvaal	
Elandré van der Bergh	Flanker	Eastern Province	
Tiaan Strauss	No. 8	Western Province	
Gary Teichmann	No. 8	Natal	

== Results ==
Scores and results list South Africa's points tally first.

No.	Date	Opposing Team	Venue	Result	For	Against	Status
1.	22 October 1994	Cardiff	Cardiff Arms Park, Cardiff	Won	11	6	Tour match
2.	26 October 1994	Wales A	Rodney Parade, Newport	Won	25	13	Tour match
3.	29 October 1994	Llanelli RFC	Stradey Park, Llanelli	Won	30	12	Tour match
4.	2 November 1994	Neath RFC	The Gnoll, Neath	Won	16	13	Tour match
5.	5 November 1994	Swansea	St. Helen's, Swansea	Won	78	7	Tour match
6.	9 November 1994	Scotland A	The Greenyards, Melrose	Lost	15	17	Tour match
7.	12 November 1994	Combined Scottish Districts	Old Anniesland, Glasgow	Won	33	6	Tour match
8.	15 November 1994	Scottish Select	Rubislaw, Aberdeen	Won	35	10	Tour match
9.	19 November 1994	Scotland	Murrayfield, Edinburgh	Won	34	10	Test match
10.	22 November 1994	Pontypridd RFC	Sardis Road, Pontypridd	Won	9	3	Tour match
11.	26 November 1994	Wales	National Stadium, Cardiff	Won	20	12	Test match
12.	29 November 1994	Combined Provinces	Ravenhill Stadium, Belfast	Won	54	19	Tour match
13.	3 December 1994	Barbarians	Lansdowne Road, Dublin	Lost	15	23	Tour match

== Test Matches ==
=== Test: Scotland ===
19 November 1994

Scotland	10–34	South Africa
Try: Stanger; Con: G. Hastings; Pen: G. Hastings		Try: van der Westhuizen (2); Straeuli, Williams, Mulder; Con: Joubert (3); Pen: Joubert

Murrayfield, Edinburgh
Attendance: 63 500
Referee: Owen Doyle (Ireland)

Scotland			South Africa
(capt.) Gavin Hastings	FB	15	FB	Andre Joubert
Tony Stanger	W	14	W	Pieter Hendriks
Scott Hastings	C	13	C	Pieter Muller
Graham Shiel	C	12	C	Japie Mulder
Kenny Logan	W	11	W	Chester Williams
Craig Chalmers	FH	10	FH	Hennie le Roux
Derrick Patterson	SH	9	SH	Joost van der Westhuizen
Doddie Weir	N8	8	N8	Rudolf Straeuli
Iain Morrison	F	7	F	Ruben Kruger
Dave McIvor	F	6	F	Francois Pienaar (capt.)
Andy Reed	L	5	L	Phillip Schutte
Jeremy Richardson	L	4	L	Mark Andrews
Paul Burnell	P	3	P	Tommie Laubscher
Kenny Milne	H	2	H	Uli Schmidt
Alan Sharp	P	1	P	Os du Randt
		Replacements
Craig Joiner		16		Kevin Putt
Ian Jardine		17		Joel Stransky
Graeme Burns		18		Gavin Johnson
Rob Wainwright		19		James Dalton
Peter Wright		20		Balie Swart
Kevin McKenzie		21		Tiaan Strauss
		Coaches
Jim Telfer				Kitch Christie

=== Test: Wales ===
26 November 1994

Wales	12–20	South Africa
Pen: Jenkins (4)		Try: Joubert; Straueli, Williams; Con: le Roux; Pen: le Roux

National Stadium, Cardiff
Attendance: 53 000
Referee: Didier Mene (France)

Wales			South Africa
Tony Clement	FB	15	FB	Andre Joubert
Wayne Proctor	W	14	W	Pieter Hendriks
Mike Hall	C	13	C	Pieter Muller
Mark Taylor	C	12	C	Japie Mulder
Simon Hill	W	11	W	Chester Williams
Neil Jenkins	FH	10	FH	Hennie le Roux
Rupert Moon	SH	9	SH	Joost van der Westhuizen
Emyr Lewis	N8	8	N8	Rudolf Straeuli
Richie Collins	F	7	F	Ruben Kruger
Hemi Taylor	F	6	F	Francois Pienaar (capt.)
(capt.) Gareth Llewellyn	L	5	L	Phillip Schutte
Derwyn Jones	L	4	L	Mark Andrews
John Davis	P	3	P	Tommie Laubscher
(substituted off) Garin Jenkins	H	2	H	Uli Schmidt
Ricky Evans	P	1	P	Os du Randt
		Replacements
Mathew Back		16		Kevin Putt
Adrian Davies		17		Joel Stransky
Paul John		18		Gavin Johnson
Phil Davies		19		James Dalton
Mike Griffiths		20		Balie Swart
(substituted on) Robin McBryde		21		Tiaan Strauss
		Coaches
Alan Davies				Kitch Christie
