= 1998 Currie Cup =

Domestic rugby union competition

- Countries: South Africa
- Date: 8 July – 31 October 1998
- Champions: Blue Bulls (18th title)
- Runners-up: Western Province
- Matches played: 94

The 1998 Currie Cup was the 60th season of the Currie Cup, South Africa's premier domestic rugby union competition, since it started in 1889. The competition was known as the Bankfin Currie Cup for sponsorship reasons and was contested from 8 July to 29 October 1998. (Note: There are some discrepancies. The match dates are given to be Wednesdays, Thursdays and Fridays, which is unlikely, since matches are generally played on Saturdays. It is also unlikely that the Sharks would have played all their matches at the University of Natal, rather than their traditional home, the Kings Park Stadium.)

The competition was won by the Blue Bulls for the 18th time in their history; they beat Western Province 24–20 in the final played on 29 October 1998.

== Competition rules and information ==
There were fourteen participating teams in the 1998 Currie Cup. These teams played all the other teams once over the course of the season, either at home or away.

Teams received four points for a win and two points for a draw. Bonus points were awarded to teams that scored four or more tries in a game, as well as to teams that lost a match by seven points or less. Teams were ranked by log points, then points difference (points scored less points conceded). The top 4 teams qualified for the title play-offs. In the semi-finals, the team that finished first had home advantage against the team that finished fourth, while the team that finished second had home advantage against the team that finished third. The winners of these semi-finals advanced to the final, at the home venue of the higher-placed team.

== Teams ==
Location of teams in the 1998 Currie Cup

=== Team Listing ===
1998 Currie Cup teams
| Team | Sponsored Name | Stadium/s | Sponsored Name |
|---|---|---|---|
| Blue Bulls | Blue Bulls | Loftus Versfeld, Pretoria | Minolta Loftus |
| Boland Cavaliers | Bokomo Boland Cavaliers | Boland Stadium, Wellington | Boland Stadium |
| Border | Border | Waverley Park, East London | Waverley Park |
| Eastern Province | Eastern Province | PE Stadium, Port Elizabeth | PE Stadium |
| Falcons | MTN Falcons | Bosman Stadium, Brakpan | Bosman Stadium |
| Free State Cheetahs | Free State Cheetahs | Free State Stadium, Bloemfontein | Vodacom Park |
| Golden Lions | Golden Lions | Ellis Park Stadium, Johannesburg | Ellis Park Stadium |
| Griqualand West | Griqualand West | Griqua Park, Kimberley | ABSA Park |
| Mpumalanga Pumas | Mpumalanga Pumas | Johann van Riebeeck Stadium, Witbank | Johann van Riebeeck Stadium |
| North West | North West | Olën Park, Potchefstroom | Olën Park |
| Northern Free State | Northern Free State | North West Stadium, Welkom | North West Stadium |
| Sharks | Sharks | University of Natal, Durban | University of Natal |
| SWD Eagles | SWD Eagles | Outeniqua Park, George | Outeniqua Park |
| Western Province | Norwich Western Province | Newlands Stadium, Cape Town | Fedsure Park Newlands |

=== Changes from 1997 ===
There were name changes prior to this season:

- Boland were renamed Boland Cavaliers
- Gauteng Lions were renamed Golden Lions
- Northern Transvaal were renamed the Blue Bulls

== Log ==
The final log of the round-robin stage of the 1998 Currie Cup: (Note: The log on the South African Rugby Union's page seems to use the old points scoring system of two points for a win and one for a draw, instead of the system that has four points for a win, two points for a draw and bonus points for losing by less than seven points or scoring more than four tries in a match. The log also incorrectly includes the results of matches in the semi-final and final.)

1998 Currie Cup log
| Pos | Team | Pld | W | D | L | PF | PA | PD | TF | TA | TB | LB | Pts | Qualification |
|---|---|---|---|---|---|---|---|---|---|---|---|---|---|---|
| 1 | Griqualand West | 13 | 10 | 0 | 3 | 478 | 216 | +262 | 70 | 26 | 8 | 2 | 50 | semi-finals |
| 2 | Blue Bulls | 13 | 10 | 0 | 3 | 461 | 231 | +230 | 65 | 28 | 7 | 2 | 49 | semi-finals |
| 3 | Sharks | 13 | 9 | 1 | 3 | 410 | 242 | +168 | 54 | 25 | 7 | 2 | 47 | semi-finals |
| 4 | Western Province | 13 | 10 | 0 | 3 | 371 | 247 | +124 | 49 | 27 | 5 | 2 | 47 | semi-finals |
| 5 | Free State Cheetahs | 13 | 8 | 1 | 4 | 453 | 314 | +139 | 56 | 31 | 8 | 1 | 43 | |
| 6 | Falcons | 13 | 9 | 1 | 3 | 381 | 285 | +96 | 48 | 35 | 5 | 0 | 43 | |
| 7 | SWD Eagles | 13 | 7 | 1 | 5 | 378 | 290 | +88 | 51 | 38 | 7 | 2 | 39 | |
| 8 | Golden Lions | 13 | 7 | 0 | 6 | 389 | 279 | +110 | 55 | 37 | 6 | 2 | 36 | |
| 9 | Eastern Province | 13 | 5 | 0 | 8 | 345 | 313 | +32 | 46 | 45 | 5 | 3 | 28 | |
| 10 | Boland Cavaliers | 13 | 5 | 0 | 8 | 253 | 456 | −203 | 38 | 67 | 3 | 1 | 24 | |
| 11 | Mpumalanga Pumas | 13 | 4 | 0 | 9 | 284 | 381 | −97 | 37 | 52 | 3 | 2 | 21 | |
| 12 | Border | 13 | 2 | 0 | 11 | 236 | 472 | −236 | 27 | 68 | 3 | 2 | 13 | |
| 13 | North West | 13 | 2 | 0 | 11 | 236 | 637 | −401 | 28 | 100 | 1 | 1 | 10 | |
| 14 | Northern Free State | 13 | 1 | 0 | 12 | 212 | 524 | −312 | 27 | 72 | 4 | 1 | 9 | |

Rules for classification: 4 points for a win; 2 points for a draw; 1 bonus point for a loss by seven points or less; 1 bonus point for scoring four or more tries in a match

== Matches ==
The following matches were played in the 1998 Currie Cup:

=== Round one ===
| 8 July 1998 | North West | 10–34 | Golden Lions | Olën Park, Potchefstroom |
| | | Scoreboard |

| 9 July 1998 | Griqualand West | 87–14 | Border | Griqua Park, Kimberley |
| | | Scoreboard |

=== Round two ===
| 15 July 1998 | Boland Cavaliers | 14–9 | Northern Free State | Boland Stadium, Wellington |
| | | Scoreboard |

| 15 July 1998 | Golden Lions | 26–27 | SWD Eagles | Ellis Park Stadium, Johannesburg |
| | | Scoreboard |

| 16 July 1998 | Border | 15–23 | North West | Waverley Park, East London |
| | | Scoreboard |

| 16 July 1998 | Eastern Province | 26–35 | Blue Bulls | PE Stadium, Port Elizabeth |
| | Try: Henry Pedro (2); Con: Gert Peens (2); Pen: Gert Peens (4) | Scoreboard | Try: Schutte Bekker, Grant Esterhuizen (2), Mike Marais, Conrad Breytenbach; Con: Casper Steyn, Graeme Bouwer; Pen: Casper Steyn, Graeme Bouwer |

| 16 July 1998 | Free State Cheetahs | 40–13 | Falcons | Free State Stadium, Bloemfontein |
| | | Scoreboard |

| 16 July 1998 | Western Province | 24–21 | Griqualand West | Newlands Stadium, Cape Town |
| | | Scoreboard |

| 17 July 1998 | Mpumalanga Pumas | 17–31 | Sharks | Johann van Riebeeck Stadium, Witbank |
| | | Scoreboard |

=== Round three ===
| 22 July 1998 | North West | 7–57 | Western Province | Olën Park, Potchefstroom |
| | | Scoreboard |

| 23 July 1998 | Falcons | 19–17 | Golden Lions | Bosman Stadium, Brakpan |
| | | Scoreboard |

| 23 July 1998 | Griqualand West | 18–15 | Blue Bulls | Griqua Park, Kimberley |
| | Try: Jereus Nicholas, Gaffie Du Toit; Con: Gaffie Du Toit; Pen: Gaffie Du Toit (2) | Scoreboard | Try: Casper Steyn, Graeme Bouwer; Con: Casper Steyn; Pen: Casper Steyn |

| 23 July 1998 | Sharks | 43–24 | Eastern Province | University of Natal, Durban |
| | | Scoreboard |

| 23 July 1998 | Northern Free State | 34–33 | Free State Cheetahs | North West Stadium, Welkom |
| | | Scoreboard |

| 23 July 1998 | SWD Eagles | 44–16 | Mpumalanga Pumas | Outeniqua Park, George |
| | | Scoreboard |

| 24 July 1998 | Border | 29–19 | Boland Cavaliers | Waverley Park, East London |
| | | Scoreboard |

=== Round four ===
| 29 July 1998 | Free State Cheetahs | 36–18 | Border | Free State Stadium, Bloemfontein |
| | | Scoreboard |

| 30 July 1998 | Blue Bulls | 68–11 | North West | Loftus Versfeld, Pretoria |
| | Try: Wim Meyer, Conrad Breytenbach (2), Grant Esterhuizen (3), Gerhard Laufs, Jacques Olivier (2), Louis van Straaten, Ruben Kruger, Pierre Ribbens; Con: Hannes Venter (4) | Scoreboard | Try: Danie de Waal; Pen: JB van den Berg; Drop: AC Prinsloo |

| 30 July 1998 | Golden Lions | 54–9 | Northern Free State | Ellis Park Stadium, Johannesburg |
| | | Scoreboard |

| 30 July 1998 | Mpumalanga Pumas | 10–20 | Falcons | Johann van Riebeeck Stadium, Witbank |
| | | Scoreboard |

| 30 July 1998 | Sharks | 17–23 | Griqualand West | University of Natal, Durban |
| | | Scoreboard |

| 31 July 1998 | Eastern Province | 11–13 | SWD Eagles | PE Stadium, Port Elizabeth |
| | | Scoreboard |

=== Round Five ===
| 5 August 1998 | Blue Bulls | 48–3 | Mpumalanga Pumas | Loftus Versfeld, Pretoria |
| | Try: Schutte Bekker, Jacques Olivier, Ruben Kruger, Wim Meyer (2), Grant Esterhuizen, Casper Steyn; Con: Hannes Venter (5); Pen: Hannes Venter | Scoreboard | Pen: Heinz Pflugler |

| 5 August 1998 | Griqualand West | 46–8 | North West | Griqua Park, Kimberley |
| | | Scoreboard |

| 6 August 1998 | Falcons | 39–17 | Boland Cavaliers | Bosman Stadium, Brakpan |
| | | Scoreboard |

| 6 August 1998 | Golden Lions | 11–10 | Sharks | Ellis Park Stadium, Johannesburg |
| | | Scoreboard |

| 6 August 1998 | Northern Free State | 21–27 | Border | North West Stadium, Welkom |
| | | Scoreboard |

| 6 August 1998 | Western Province | 34–30 | Eastern Province | Newlands Stadium, Cape Town |
| | | Scoreboard |

| 7 August 1998 | SWD Eagles | 27–38 | Free State Cheetahs | Outeniqua Park, George |
| | | Scoreboard |

=== Round Six ===
| 11 August 1998 | Free State Cheetahs | 27–23 | Mpumalanga Pumas | Free State Stadium, Bloemfontein |
| | | Scoreboard |

| 12 August 1998 | Boland Cavaliers | 29–19 | Eastern Province | Boland Stadium, Wellington |
| | | Scoreboard |

| 12 August 1998 | Falcons | 17–13 | Western Province | Bosman Stadium, Brakpan |
| | | Scoreboard |

| 12 August 1998 | North West | 25–14 | Northern Free State | Olën Park, Potchefstroom |
| | | Scoreboard |

| 12 August 1998 | SWD Eagles | 29–32 | Blue Bulls | Outeniqua Park, George |
| | Try: Barney Vorster, Anton Leonard (2), Manie du Toit, Botha Rossouw; Con: Jacques Benade (2) | Scoreboard | Try: Andries Truscott, Grant Esterhuizen, Wim Meyer (2), Conrad Breytenbach; Con: Hannes Venter (2); Pen: Hannes Venter |

=== Round Seven ===
| 19 August 1998 | Blue Bulls | 27–22 | Falcons | Loftus Versfeld, Pretoria |
| | Try: Graeme Bouwer, Ruben Kruger; Con: Casper Steyn; Pen: Casper Steyn (5) | Scoreboard | Try: Ralf Schroeder, Piet Matthys, Brent Moyle; Con: Rynhard van As (2); Pen: Rynhard van As |

| 19 August 1998 | Eastern Province | 20–7 | Free State Cheetahs | PE Stadium, Port Elizabeth |
| | | Scoreboard |

| 19 August 1998 | Mpumalanga Pumas | 21–44 | Golden Lions | Johann van Riebeeck Stadium, Witbank |
| | | Scoreboard |

| 19 August 1998 | Sharks | 15–14 | SWD Eagles | University of Natal, Durban |
| | | Scoreboard |

| 19 August 1998 | Western Province | 31–7 | Northern Free State | Newlands Stadium, Cape Town |
| | | Scoreboard |

| 21 August 1998 | Boland Cavaliers | 17–13 | Griqualand West | Boland Stadium, Wellington |
| | | Scoreboard |

=== Round Eight ===
| 26 August 1998 | Falcons | 29–40 | Sharks | Bosman Stadium, Brakpan |
| | | Scoreboard |

| 26 August 1998 | Northern Free State | 5–28 | Blue Bulls | North West Stadium, Welkom |
| | Try: Richard Olivier | Scoreboard | Try: Hannes Venter, Nicky van der Walt, Louis van Straaten, Conrad Breytenbach; Con: Hannes Venter; Pen: Franco Smith, Hannes Venter |

| 27 August 1998 | Golden Lions | 43–22 | Eastern Province | Ellis Park Stadium, Johannesburg |
| | | Scoreboard |

| 27 August 1998 | Griqualand West | 48–28 | Free State Cheetahs | Griqua Park, Kimberley |
| | | Scoreboard |

| 27 August 1998 | North West | 34–36 | Boland Cavaliers | Rustenburg Platina Rugby Club, Rustenburg |
| | | Scoreboard |

| 28 August 1998 | Border | 14–15 | Western Province | Waverley Park, East London |
| | | Scoreboard |

=== Round Nine ===
| 2 September 1998 | Free State Cheetahs | 89–25 | North West | Free State Stadium, Bloemfontein |
| | | Scoreboard |

| 3 September 1998 | Blue Bulls | 59–21 | Border | Loftus Versfeld, Pretoria |
| | Try: Conrad Breytenbach, Franco Smith (2), Hannes Venter (2), Joost van der Westhuizen (2), Grant Esterhuizen, Wessel Roux; Con: Franco Smith (5), Roland de Marigny (2) | Scoreboard | Try: Graham Carlson, Andre Fox, Andre Claasen; Con: John Bradbrook (3) |

| 3 September 1998 | Eastern Province | 20–17 | Mpumalanga Pumas | PE Stadium, Port Elizabeth |
| | | Scoreboard |

| 3 September 1998 | Sharks | 57–3 | Northern Free State | University of Natal, Durban |
| | | Scoreboard |

| 3 September 1998 | SWD Eagles | 21–21 | Falcons | Outeniqua Park, George |
| | | Scoreboard |

| 3 September 1998 | Western Province | 25–39 | Boland Cavaliers | Newlands Stadium, Cape Town |
| | | Scoreboard |

| 4 September 1998 | Griqualand West | 36–16 | Golden Lions | Griqua Park, Kimberley |
| | | Scoreboard |

=== Round Ten ===
| 9 September 1998 | Boland Cavaliers | 22–31 | SWD Eagles | Boland Stadium, Wellington |
| | | Scoreboard |

| 9 September 1998 | Northern Free State | 19–52 | Griqualand West | North West Stadium, Welkom |
| | | Scoreboard |

| 10 September 1998 | Border | 26–50 | Falcons | Waverley Park, East London |
| | | Scoreboard |

| 10 September 1998 | Free State Cheetahs | 19–19 | Sharks | Free State Stadium, Bloemfontein |
| | | Scoreboard |

| 10 September 1998 | Golden Lions | 12–20 | Blue Bulls | Ellis Park Stadium, Johannesburg |
| | Try: Joe Esterhuysen, James Small; Con: Kobus Engelbrecht | Scoreboard | Try: Jacques Olivier, Schutte Bekker, Ruben Kruger; Con: Franco Smith; Pen: Franco Smith |

| 10 September 1998 | North West | 15–64 | Eastern Province | Olën Park, Potchefstroom |
| | | Scoreboard |

| 11 September 1998 | Mpumalanga Pumas | 19–31 | Western Province | Johann van Riebeeck Stadium, Witbank |
| | | Scoreboard |

=== Round Eleven ===
| 16 September 1998 | Falcons | 62–24 | Northern Free State | Bosman Stadium, Brakpan |
| | | Scoreboard |

| 16 September 1998 | Mpumalanga Pumas | 62–17 | North West | Johann van Riebeeck Stadium, Witbank |
| | | Scoreboard |

| 17 September 1998 | Eastern Province | 12–19 | Griqualand West | PE Stadium, Port Elizabeth |
| | | Scoreboard |

| 17 September 1998 | Golden Lions | 35–42 | Western Province | Ellis Park Stadium, Johannesburg |
| | | Scoreboard |

| 17 September 1998 | SWD Eagles | 52–16 | Border | Outeniqua Park, George |
| | | Scoreboard |

| 18 September 1998 | Sharks | 55–14 | Boland Cavaliers | University of Natal, Durban |
| | | Scoreboard |

=== Round Twelve ===
| 23 September 1998 | Griqualand West | 64–7 | Mpumalanga Pumas | Griqua Park, Kimberley |
| | | Scoreboard |

| 24 September 1998 | Boland Cavaliers | 3–57 | Blue Bulls | Boland Stadium, Wellington |
| | Pen: Pieter O’Neill | Scoreboard | Try: Nicky van der Walt (3), Andre Snyman (2), Derrick Grobbelaar, Danie van Schalkwyk, Jacques Olivier, Joost van der Westhuizen; Con: Franco Smith (6) |

| 24 September 1998 | Border | 21–36 | Sharks | Waverley Park, East London |
| | | Scoreboard |

| 24 September 1998 | Northern Free State | 25–46 | SWD Eagles | North West Stadium, Welkom |
| | | Scoreboard |

| 25 September 1998 | Western Province | 17–24 | Free State Cheetahs | Newlands Stadium, Cape Town |
| | | Scoreboard |

=== Round Thirteen ===
| 30 September 1998 | Northern Free State | 13–43 | Mpumalanga Pumas | North West Stadium, Welkom |
| | | Scoreboard |

| 30 September 1998 | SWD Eagles | 14–33 | Griqualand West | Outeniqua Park, George |
| | | Scoreboard |

| 1 October 1998 | Blue Bulls | 20–38 | Western Province | Loftus Versfeld, Pretoria |
| | Try: Penalty try, Danie van Schalkwyk; Con: Franco Smith (2); Pen: Franco Smith (2) | Scoreboard | Try: Breyton Paulse (3), Bobby Skinstad (3); Con: Percy Montgomery (4) |

| 1 October 1998 | Border | 5–12 | Golden Lions | Waverley Park, East London |
| | | Scoreboard |

| 1 October 1998 | Falcons | 21–10 | Eastern Province | Bosman Stadium, Brakpan |
| | | Scoreboard |

| 1 October 1998 | North West | 24–57 | Sharks | Olën Park, Potchefstroom |
| | | Scoreboard |

| 2 October 1998 | Boland Cavaliers | 19–59 | Free State Cheetahs | Boland Stadium, Wellington |
| | | Scoreboard |

=== Round Fourteen ===
| 7 October 1998 | Mpumalanga Pumas | 19–0 | Boland Cavaliers | Johann van Riebeeck Stadium, Witbank |
| | | Scoreboard |

| 8 October 1998 | Eastern Province | 35–8 | Border | PE Stadium, Port Elizabeth |
| | | Scoreboard |

| 8 October 1998 | Free State Cheetahs | 34–18 | Golden Lions | Free State Stadium, Bloemfontein |
| | | Scoreboard |

| 8 October 1998 | Sharks | 24–19 | Blue Bulls | University of Natal, Durban |
| | Try: Mark Andrews, Wayne Fyvie; Con: Andre Joubert; Pen: Andre Joubert (4) | Scoreboard | Try: Nicky van der Walt, Joost van der Westhuizen, Hannes Venter; Con: Franco Smith (2) |

| 8 October 1998 | North West | 22–43 | Falcons | Olën Park, Potchefstroom |
| | | Scoreboard |

| 8 October 1998 | Western Province | 20–8 | SWD Eagles | Newlands Stadium, Cape Town |
| | | Scoreboard |

=== Round Fifteen ===
| 14 October 1998 | Golden Lions | 67–24 | Boland Cavaliers | Ellis Park Stadium, Johannesburg |
| | | Scoreboard |

| 14 October 1998 | Mpumalanga Pumas | 27–22 | Border | Johann van Riebeeck Stadium, Witbank |
| | | Scoreboard |

| 15 October 1998 | Blue Bulls | 33–19 | Free State Cheetahs | Loftus Versfeld, Pretoria |
| | Try: Piet Boer, Jannie Brooks; Con: Franco Smith; Pen: Franco Smith (7) | Scoreboard | Try: Naka Drotske; Con: Jannie de Beer; Pen: Jannie de Beer (4) |

| 15 October 1998 | Eastern Province | 52–29 | Northern Free State | PE Stadium, Port Elizabeth |
| | | Scoreboard |

| 15 October 1998 | Griqualand West | 18–25 | Falcons | Griqua Park, Kimberley |
| | | Scoreboard |

| 15 October 1998 | SWD Eagles | 52–15 | North West | Outeniqua Park, George |
| | | Scoreboard |

| 15 October 1998 | Western Province | 24–6 | Sharks | Newlands Stadium, Cape Town |
| | | Scoreboard |

=== Semi-finals ===
| 22 October 1998 | Blue Bulls | 31–17 | Sharks | Loftus Versfeld, Pretoria |
| | Try: Franco Smith, Nicky van der Walt, Penalty try Con: Franco Smith (2); Pen: Franco Smith (4) | Scoreboard | Try: Andre Joubert (2); Con: Gavin Lawless (2); Pen: Gavin Lawless |

| 22 October 1998 | Griqualand West | 11–27 | Western Province | Griqua Park, Kimberley |
| | | Scoreboard |

=== Final ===
| 29 October 1998 | Blue Bulls | 24–20 | Western Province | Loftus Versfeld, Pretoria |
| | Try: Conrad Breytenbach, Wim Meyer; Con: Franco Smith; Pen: Franco Smith (4) | Scoreboard | Try: Charl Marais, Chester Williams; Con: Dan van Zyl (2); Pen: Percy Montgomery, Dan van Zyl |

== Honours ==
The honour roll for the 1998 Currie Cup was:

1998 Currie Cup Honours
| Champions: | Blue Bulls (18th title) |
