= 1996 Northern Transvaal Currie Cup season =

1996 season of the Blue Bulls rugby team

1996 Currie Cup
- Countries: South Africa
- Champions: Sharks
- Runners-up: Gauteng Lions

The 1996 Blue Bulls rugby season marked the transition from the name "Northern Transvaal" to the "Blue Bulls." The team competed in the 1996 Currie Cup and made headlines with a record-breaking 147–8 win over the SWD Eagles, the highest score in Currie Cup history.

== Season overview ==
The 1996 season was notable not only for the rebranding of the team but also for their strong performances throughout the Currie Cup. The Blue Bulls secured a semi-final position and had one of the best attacking records in the competition.

== Fixtures and results ==
=== Currie Cup matches ===
1996 Currie Cup Results – Blue Bulls
Game №	Blue Bulls	Opponent	Date	Venue	Result	Notes	
1	56	7	Griffons	27 July 1996	Loftus Versfeld, Pretoria	Win	
2	72	24	Falcons	7 September 1996	Bosman Stadion, Brakpan	Win	
3	51	30	Free State	14 September 1996	Loftus Versfeld, Pretoria	Win	
4	27	16	Western Province	21 September 1996	Newlands, Cape Town	Win	
5	147	8	SWD Eagles	4 October 1996	Pietersburg	Win	Record victory
6	42	15	Griquas	1996	Kimberley	Win	
7	25	27	Free State	1996	Bloemfontein	Loss	
8	80	22	Falcons	1996	Loftus Versfeld, Pretoria	Win	
9	53	8	Griffons	1996	Welkom	Win	
10	51	20	Western Province	1996	Loftus Versfeld, Pretoria	Win	
11	56	13	SWD Eagles	1996	Oudtshoorn	Win	
12	47	17	Griquas	1996	Loftus Versfeld, Pretoria	Win	
13	55	23	Boland Cavaliers	11 October 1996	Loftus Versfeld, Pretoria	Win	Quarter-final
14	21	31	Golden Lions	19 October 1996	Loftus Versfeld, Pretoria	Loss	Semi-final

== Log standings ==
=== 1996 Currie Cup Section B ===
Final standings
Position	Team	Played	Won	Drawn	Lost	PF	PA	PD	TF	TA	Points
1st	Blue Bulls	12	11	0	1	707	207	+500	93	23	22

== Historical performance ==
=== 1988–1996 Blue Bulls (incl. playoffs) ===
Results Summary
Period	Games	Won	Drawn	Lost	Win %	Points For	Avg PF	Points Against	40–49 pts	50–99 pts	100+ pts	Best Score	Worst Loss
1988–1996	110	78	3	29	70.91%	3412	31.02	2126	9	14	1	147–8 vs SWD Eagles (4 Oct 1996)	13–57 vs Transvaal (1994)

== Legacy ==
The 1996 season is often remembered for the Blue Bulls' attacking dominance and their transition to a modern rugby brand identity. The record-setting performance against SWD Eagles remains one of the highlights in Currie Cup history.

== See also ==
- Blue Bulls
- Currie Cup
- South African rugby union
- 1996 Currie Cup
