= History of rugby union matches between New Zealand and South Africa =

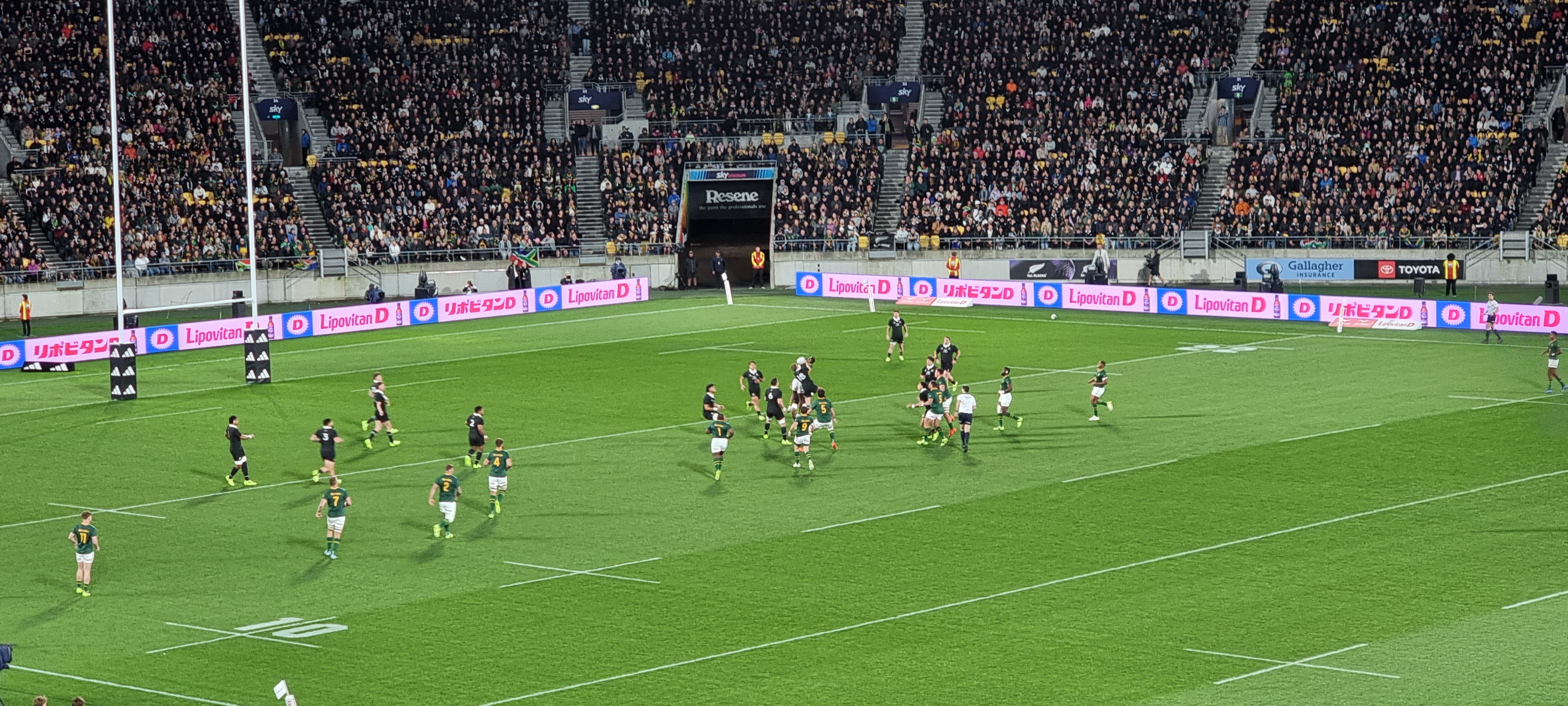
Match between New Zealand and South Africa on 13 September 2025 at Sky Stadium, Wellington, New Zealand.

New Zealand (the All Blacks) and South Africa (the Springboks) have been playing rugby test matches against each other since 1921 when the All Blacks beat the Springboks in Dunedin 13–5. It is argued to be the biggest rivalry in world rugby, with both countries being among the sport's premier sides, having positive win records against every other nation, and holding 7 of the 10 rugby world cup trophies between them. New Zealand is the only nation to have won more games than it has lost against South Africa, and South Africa has the highest win percentage in the world against New Zealand. There is considerable history behind the rivalry, much of it off the field. The 1981 Springbok tour of New Zealand resulted in the largest mass civil unrest in New Zealand history as people protested over the Springboks coming to tour their country due to the then South African government's policy of Apartheid. Consequently, subsequent tours were cancelled and the All Blacks and Springboks did not meet again until August 1992, in Johannesburg, when the Springboks were re-admitted to World Rugby. The 1995 World Cup final between these two nations, with Springbok captain Francois Pienaar holding aloft the world cup trophy alongside former South African President, Nelson Mandela, is an iconic moment in the sport's history - and seen as a pivotal moment in South Africa's post-apartheid nation-building. It took New Zealand 35 years to win their first series against South Africa (in 1956), and not until 1996 did New Zealand win their first series on South African soil (South Africa had won a series in New Zealand in 1937). The rivalry was close for eighty years between 1921–2000, when New Zealand led the head-to-head by 27–26. In the first 17 years of the 21st century, however, New Zealand compiled a 31–10 record over South Africa. This was during a period in which New Zealand dominated world rugby, but also coincided with two periods of dysfunction in South African rugby under coaches Rudolf Straeuli and Allister Coetzee in 2002–2003 and 2016–2018 respectively. South Africa's resurgence since the appointment of Rassie Erasmus as coach of the Springboks in 2018 has resulted in the rivalry reigniting, as South Africa lead the series 11–7 (with one draw) since his appointment, including inflicting New Zealand's two worst ever defeats. They have faced each other 114 times with New Zealand winning 64 times, South Africa 46 times and with 4 draws between the two sides. As befits the intensity of the rivalry, the two sides are responsible for each other's largest defeats with New Zealand beating South Africa 57–0 in 2017 and South Africa beating New Zealand 43–10 in 2025.

Since 2004 New Zealand and South Africa have contested the Freedom Cup. It has remained a trophy contested annually in the Tri Nations Series/Rugby Championship since 2006.

== Summary ==
=== Overall ===
Details	Played	Won by New Zealand	Won by South Africa	Drawn	New Zealand points	South Africa points
In New Zealand	48	34	11	3	1,037	676
In South Africa	57	26	30	1	1,159	1,095
Neutral venue	9	4	5	0	184	200
Overall	114	64	46	4	2,380	1,971

=== Records ===
Note: Date shown in brackets indicates when the record was or last set.

Record	New Zealand	South Africa
Longest winning streak	8 (21 July 2001 – 14 August 2004)	6 (4 September 1937 – 14 July 1956)
World Cup head-to-head
Final	0	2
Semifinal	1	0
Third place	0	1
Quarterfinals	1	0
Pool	1	0
Overall	3	3
Largest points for
Home	57 (16 September 2017)	46 (19 August 2000)
Away	57 (8 October 2016)	43 (13 September 2025)
Largest winning margin
Home	57 (16 September 2017)	17 (30 June 1928)
Away	42 (8 October 2016)	33 (13 September 2025)
Neutral	20 (9 November 2003)	28 (25 August 2023)
Largest aggregate score
90 (South Africa 35–55 New Zealand) (9 August 1997)

== Results ==
No.	Date	Venue	Score	Winner	Competition
1	13 August 1921	Carisbrook, Dunedin	13–5	New Zealand	1921 South Africa tour of Australia and New Zealand
2	27 August 1921	Eden Park, Auckland	5–9	South Africa	1921 South Africa tour of Australia and New Zealand
3	17 September 1921	Athletic Park, Wellington	0–0	draw	1921 South Africa tour of Australia and New Zealand
4	30 June 1928	Kingsmead Cricket Ground, Durban	17–0	South Africa	1928 New Zealand tour of South Africa
5	21 July 1928	Ellis Park Stadium, Johannesburg	6–7	New Zealand	1928 New Zealand tour of South Africa
6	18 August 1928	Crusaders Ground, Port Elizabeth	11–6	South Africa	1928 New Zealand tour of South Africa
7	1 September 1928	Newlands Stadium, Cape Town	5–13	New Zealand	1928 New Zealand tour of South Africa
8	14 August 1937	Athletic Park, Wellington	13–7	New Zealand	1937 South Africa tour of Australia and New Zealand
9	4 September 1937	Lancaster Park, Christchurch	6–13	South Africa	1937 South Africa tour of Australia and New Zealand
10	25 September 1937	Eden Park, Auckland	6–17	South Africa	1937 South Africa tour of Australia and New Zealand
11	16 July 1949	Newlands Stadium, Cape Town	15–11	South Africa	1949 New Zealand tour of South Africa
12	13 August 1949	Ellis Park Stadium, Johannesburg	12–6	South Africa	1949 New Zealand tour of South Africa
13	3 September 1949	Kingsmead Cricket Ground, Durban	9–3	South Africa	1949 New Zealand tour of South Africa
14	17 September 1949	Crusaders Ground, Port Elizabeth	11–8	South Africa	1949 New Zealand tour of South Africa
15	14 July 1956	Carisbrook, Dunedin	10–6	New Zealand	1956 South Africa tour of Australia and New Zealand
16	4 August 1956	Athletic Park, Wellington	3–8	South Africa	1956 South Africa tour of Australia and New Zealand
17	18 August 1956	Lancaster Park, Christchurch	17–10	New Zealand	1956 South Africa tour of Australia and New Zealand
18	1 September 1956	Eden Park, Auckland	11–5	New Zealand	1956 South Africa tour of Australia and New Zealand
19	25 June 1960	Ellis Park Stadium, Johannesburg	13–0	South Africa	1960 New Zealand tour of Australia and South Africa
20	23 July 1960	Newlands Stadium, Cape Town	3–11	New Zealand	1960 New Zealand tour of Australia and South Africa
21	13 August 1960	Free State Stadium, Bloemfontein	11–11	draw	1960 New Zealand tour of Australia and South Africa
22	27 August 1960	Boet Erasmus Stadium, Port Elizabeth	8–3	South Africa	1960 New Zealand tour of Australia and South Africa
23	31 July 1965	Athletic Park, Wellington	6–3	New Zealand	1965 South Africa tour of Australia and New Zealand
24	21 August 1965	Carisbrook, Dunedin	13–0	New Zealand	1965 South Africa tour of Australia and New Zealand
25	4 September 1965	Lancaster Park, Christchurch	16–19	South Africa	1965 South Africa tour of Australia and New Zealand
26	18 September 1965	Eden Park, Auckland	20–3	New Zealand	1965 South Africa tour of Australia and New Zealand
27	25 July 1970	Loftus Versfeld Stadium, Pretoria	17–6	South Africa	1970 New Zealand tour of South Africa
28	8 August 1970	Newlands Stadium, Cape Town	8–9	New Zealand	1970 New Zealand tour of South Africa
29	29 August 1970	Boet Erasmus Stadium, Port Elizabeth	14–3	South Africa	1970 New Zealand tour of South Africa
30	12 September 1970	Ellis Park Stadium, Johannesburg	20–17	South Africa	1970 New Zealand tour of South Africa
31	24 July 1976	Kings Park Stadium, Durban	16–7	South Africa	1976 New Zealand tour of South Africa
32	14 August 1976	Free State Stadium, Bloemfontein	9–15	New Zealand	1976 New Zealand tour of South Africa
33	4 September 1976	Newlands Stadium, Cape Town	15–10	South Africa	1976 New Zealand tour of South Africa
34	18 September 1976	Ellis Park Stadium, Johannesburg	15–14	South Africa	1976 New Zealand tour of South Africa
35	15 August 1981	Lancaster Park, Christchurch	14–9	New Zealand	1981 South Africa tour of New Zealand and the United States
36	29 August 1981	Athletic Park, Wellington	12–24	South Africa	1981 South Africa tour of New Zealand and the United States
37	12 September 1981	Eden Park, Auckland	25–22	New Zealand	1981 South Africa tour of New Zealand and the United States
38	15 August 1992	Ellis Park Stadium, Johannesburg	24–27	New Zealand	1992 New Zealand tour of Australia and South Africa
39	9 July 1994	Carisbrook, Dunedin	22–14	New Zealand	1994 South Africa tour of New Zealand
40	23 July 1994	Athletic Park, Wellington	13–9	New Zealand	1994 South Africa tour of New Zealand
41	6 August 1994	Eden Park, Auckland	18–18	draw	1994 South Africa tour of New Zealand
42	24 June 1995	Ellis Park Stadium, Johannesburg	15–12	South Africa	1995 Rugby World Cup
43	20 July 1996	Lancaster Park, Christchurch	15–11	New Zealand	1996 Tri Nations Series
44	10 August 1996	Newlands Stadium, Cape Town	18–29	New Zealand	1996 Tri Nations Series
45	17 August 1996	Kings Park Stadium, Durban	19–23	New Zealand	1996 New Zealand tour of South Africa
46	24 August 1996	Loftus Versfeld Stadium, Pretoria	26–33	New Zealand	1996 New Zealand tour of South Africa
47	31 August 1996	Ellis Park Stadium, Johannesburg	32–22	South Africa	1996 New Zealand tour of South Africa
48	19 July 1997	Ellis Park Stadium, Johannesburg	32–35	New Zealand	1997 Tri Nations Series
49	9 August 1997	Eden Park, Auckland	55–35	New Zealand	1997 Tri Nations Series
50	25 July 1998	Athletic Park, Wellington	3–13	South Africa	1998 Tri Nations Series
51	15 August 1998	Kings Park Stadium, Durban	24–23	South Africa	1998 Tri Nations Series
52	10 July 1999	Carisbrook, Dunedin	28–0	New Zealand	1999 Tri Nations Series
53	7 August 1999	Loftus Versfeld Stadium, Pretoria	18–34	New Zealand	1999 Tri Nations Series
54	4 November 1999	Millennium Stadium, Cardiff (Wales)	22–18	South Africa	1999 Rugby World Cup
55	22 July 2000	Lancaster Park, Christchurch	25–12	New Zealand	2000 Tri Nations Series
56	19 August 2000	Ellis Park Stadium, Johannesburg	46–40	South Africa	2000 Tri Nations Series
57	21 July 2001	Newlands Stadium, Cape Town	3–12	New Zealand	2001 Tri Nations Series
58	25 August 2001	Eden Park, Auckland	26–15	New Zealand	2001 Tri Nations Series
59	20 July 2002	Wellington Regional Stadium, Wellington	41–20	New Zealand	2002 Tri Nations Series
60	10 August 2002	Kings Park Stadium, Durban	23–30	New Zealand	2002 Tri Nations Series
61	19 July 2003	Loftus Versfeld Stadium, Pretoria	16–52	New Zealand	2003 Tri Nations Series
62	9 August 2003	Carisbrook, Dunedin	19–11	New Zealand	2003 Tri Nations Series
63	9 November 2003	Docklands Stadium, Melbourne (Australia)	29–9	New Zealand	2003 Rugby World Cup
64	24 July 2004	Lancaster Park, Christchurch	23–21	New Zealand	2004 Tri Nations Series
65	14 August 2004	Ellis Park Stadium, Johannesburg	40–26	South Africa	2004 Tri Nations Series
66	6 August 2005	Newlands Stadium, Cape Town	22–16	South Africa	2005 Tri Nations Series
67	27 August 2005	Carisbrook, Dunedin	31–27	New Zealand	2005 Tri Nations Series
68	22 July 2006	Wellington Regional Stadium, Wellington	35–17	New Zealand	2006 Tri Nations Series
69	26 August 2006	Loftus Versfeld Stadium, Pretoria	26–45	New Zealand	2006 Tri Nations Series
70	2 September 2006	Royal Bafokeng Stadium, Rustenburg	21–20	South Africa	2006 Tri Nations Series
71	23 June 2007	Kings Park Stadium, Durban	21–26	New Zealand	2007 Tri Nations Series
72	14 July 2007	Lancaster Park, Christchurch	33–6	New Zealand	2007 Tri Nations Series
73	5 July 2008	Wellington Regional Stadium, Wellington	19–8	New Zealand	2008 Tri Nations Series
74	12 July 2008	Carisbrook, Dunedin	28–30	South Africa	2008 Tri Nations Series
75	16 August 2008	Newlands Stadium, Cape Town	0–19	New Zealand	2008 Tri Nations Series
76	25 July 2009	Free State Stadium, Bloemfontein	28–19	South Africa	2009 Tri Nations Series
77	1 August 2009	Kings Park Stadium, Durban	31–19	South Africa	2009 Tri Nations Series
78	12 September 2009	Waikato Stadium, Hamilton	29–32	South Africa	2009 Tri Nations Series
79	10 July 2010	Eden Park, Auckland	32–12	New Zealand	2010 Tri Nations Series
80	17 July 2010	Wellington Regional Stadium, Wellington	31–17	New Zealand	2010 Tri Nations Series
81	21 August 2010	FNB Stadium, Johannesburg	22–29	New Zealand	2010 Tri Nations Series
82	30 July 2011	Wellington Regional Stadium, Wellington	40–7	New Zealand	2011 Tri Nations Series
83	20 August 2011	Nelson Mandela Bay Stadium, Port Elizabeth	18–5	South Africa	2011 Tri Nations Series
84	15 September 2012	Forsyth Barr Stadium, Dunedin	21–11	New Zealand	2012 Rugby Championship
85	6 October 2012	FNB Stadium, Johannesburg	16–32	New Zealand	2012 Rugby Championship
86	14 September 2013	Eden Park, Auckland	29–15	New Zealand	2013 Rugby Championship
87	5 October 2013	Ellis Park Stadium, Johannesburg	27–38	New Zealand	2013 Rugby Championship
88	13 September 2014	Wellington Regional Stadium, Wellington	14–10	New Zealand	2014 Rugby Championship
89	4 October 2014	Ellis Park Stadium, Johannesburg	27–25	South Africa	2014 Rugby Championship
90	25 July 2015	Ellis Park Stadium, Johannesburg	20–27	New Zealand	2015 Rugby Championship
91	24 October 2015	Twickenham Stadium, London (England)	18–20	New Zealand	2015 Rugby World Cup
92	17 September 2016	Rugby League Park, Christchurch	41–13	New Zealand	2016 Rugby Championship
93	8 October 2016	Kings Park Stadium, Durban	15–57	New Zealand	2016 Rugby Championship
94	16 September 2017	North Harbour Stadium, Albany	57–0	New Zealand	2017 Rugby Championship
95	7 October 2017	Newlands Stadium, Cape Town	24–25	New Zealand	2017 Rugby Championship
96	15 September 2018	Wellington Regional Stadium, Wellington	34–36	South Africa	2018 Rugby Championship
97	6 October 2018	Loftus Versfeld Stadium, Pretoria	30–32	New Zealand	2018 Rugby Championship
98	27 July 2019	Wellington Regional Stadium, Wellington	16–16	draw	2019 Rugby Championship
99	21 September 2019	International Stadium Yokohama, Yokohama (Japan)	23–13	New Zealand	2019 Rugby World Cup
100	25 September 2021	North Queensland Stadium, Townsville (Australia) (Note: The 2021 Rugby Championship format was significantly altered due to the COVID-19 pandemic. As such, many matches were hosted in Australia.)	19–17	New Zealand	2021 Rugby Championship
101	2 October 2021	Robina Stadium, Gold Coast (Australia)	29–31	South Africa	2021 Rugby Championship
102	6 August 2022	Mbombela Stadium, Nelspruit	26–10	South Africa	2022 Rugby Championship
103	13 August 2022	Ellis Park Stadium, Johannesburg	23–35	New Zealand	2022 Rugby Championship
104	15 July 2023	Mount Smart Stadium, Auckland	35–20	New Zealand	2023 Rugby Championship
105	25 August 2023	Twickenham Stadium, London (England)	7–35	South Africa	2023 Rugby World Cup warm-up match
106	28 October 2023	Stade de France, Saint-Denis (France)	11–12	South Africa	2023 Rugby World Cup
107	31 August 2024	Ellis Park Stadium, Johannesburg	31–27	South Africa	2024 Rugby Championship
108	7 September 2024	Cape Town Stadium, Cape Town	18–12	South Africa	2024 Rugby Championship
109	6 September 2025	Eden Park, Auckland	24–17	New Zealand	2025 Rugby Championship
110	13 September 2025	Wellington Regional Stadium, Wellington	10–43	South Africa	2025 Rugby Championship
111	22 August 2026	Ellis Park Stadium, Johannesburg	16–33	New Zealand	2026 New Zealand tour of South Africa
112	29 August 2026	Cape Town Stadium, Cape Town	33–26	South Africa	2026 New Zealand tour of South Africa
113	5 September 2026	FNB Stadium, Johannesburg	29–24	South Africa	2026 New Zealand tour of South Africa
114	12 September 2026	M&T Bank Stadium, Baltimore (US)	43–28	South Africa	2026 New Zealand tour of South Africa

== List of series ==
Played	Won by South Africa	Won by New Zealand	Drawn
13	6	5	2
South Africa Home Played	Won by South Africa	Won by New Zealand	Drawn
7	5	1	1
New Zealand Home Played	Won by South Africa	Won by New Zealand	Drawn
6	1	4	1

Year	New Zealand	South Africa	Series winner
1921	1	1	draw
1928	2	2	draw
1937	1	2	South Africa
1949	0	4	South Africa
1956	3	1	New Zealand
1960	1	2	South Africa
1965	3	1	New Zealand
1970	1	3	South Africa
1976	1	3	South Africa
1981	2	1	New Zealand
1994	2	0	New Zealand
1996	2	1	New Zealand
2026	1	3	South Africa
2030			

== Venues ==
=== In New Zealand ===
Stadium	City	Won by New Zealand	Won by South Africa	Draw
Eden Park	Auckland	8	2	1
North Harbour Stadium	Auckland	1	0	0
Mount Smart Stadium	Auckland	1	0	0
Overall	13	10	2	1
Lancaster Park	Christchurch	6	2	0
Rugby League Park	Christchurch	1	0	0
Overall	9	7	2	0
Carisbrook	Dunedin	7	1	0
Forsyth Barr Stadium	Dunedin	1	0	0
Overall	9	8	1	0
Waikato Stadium	Hamilton	0	1	0
Overall	1	0	1	0
Athletic Park	Wellington	3	3	1
Wellington Regional Stadium	Wellington	6	2	1
Overall	16	9	5	2
Total		34	11	3

=== In South Africa ===
Stadium	City	Won by South Africa	Won by New Zealand	Draw
Free State Stadium	Bloemfontein	1	1	1
Overall	3	1	1	1
Newlands	Cape Town	3	7	0
Cape Town Stadium	Cape Town	2	0	0
Overall	11	4	7	0
Kings Park Stadium	Durban	3	4	0
Kingsmead	Durban	2	0	0
Overall	9	5	4	0
Ellis Park	Johannesburg	10	7	0
FNB Stadium	Johannesburg	1	2	0
Overall	19	11	9	0
Mbombela Stadium	Mbombela	1	0	0
Overall	1	1	0	0
Boet Erasmus Stadium	Port Elizabeth	2	0	0
Crusaders Ground	Port Elizabeth	2	0	0
Nelson Mandela Bay Stadium	Port Elizabeth	1	0	0
Overall	5	5	0	0
Loftus Versfeld Stadium	Pretoria	1	5	0
Overall	6	1	5	0
Royal Bafokeng Stadium	Rustenburg	1	0	0
Overall	1	1	0	0
Total		30	26	1

== See also ==
- History of women's rugby union matches between New Zealand and South Africa
- New Zealand Cavaliers
- Rugby union in New Zealand
- Rugby union in South Africa
- List of international rugby rivalries
