= Hattingh =

Hattingh is a surname. Notable people with the surname include:

- Chris Hattingh, South African politician
- Grant Hattingh (born 1990), South African rugby union player
- Ian Hattingh (born 1964), South African rugby union player
- Ilze Hattingh (born 1996), South African tennis player
