= 1997 England rugby union tour of Argentina and Australia =

- Coach: Les Cusworth
- Tour captain: Phil de Glanville
Summary
P	W	D	L
Total
7	5	0	2
Test match
3	1	0	2
Opponent
P	W	D	L
Argentina
2	1	0	1
Australia
1	0	0	1

Tour chronology
- ← South Africa 1994 Australasia and South Africa 1998 →

The 1997 England rugby union tour of Argentina and Australia was a series of matches played in 1997 in Argentina and Australia by the England national rugby union team.

Over a total of 7 matches (6 in Argentina and one in Australia), England played three tests (two vs Argentina, 1 win and 1 loss), and one v Australia).

== Touring party ==
- Manager: Jack Rowell
- Coach: Les Cusworth
- Captain: Phil de Glanville

== Matches summary ==
- Test matches

N°	Opposing team	Score	Date	Venue	City
1	Córdoba	38–21	21 May 1997	Estadio Olímpico	Córdoba
2	Buenos Aires	21–23	24 May 1997	BACRC Stadium	Los Polvorines
3	Argentina A	58–17	27 May 1997	BACRC Stadium	Los Polvorines
4	Argentina	46–20	31 May 1997	Ferro C. Oeste	Buenos Aires
5	Cuyo	37–8	3 June 1997	Independiente Rivadavia	Mendoza
6	Argentina	13–33	7 June 1997	Ferro C. Oeste	Buenos Aires
7	Australia	6–25	12 July 1997	Football Stadium	Sydney

== Match details ==
=== in Argentina ===
21 May

Córdoba	21–38	England
Try: Simes, Barrea; Con: Luna; Pen: Luna (3)	Report	Try: Bracken (2), Glanville, Redrnan; Con: Catt (5); Pen: Catt

Estadio Olímpico, Córdoba
Referee: Eduardo Blengio (Uruguay)

Córdoba: Facundo Soler; José Luna. Germán Sagrera, Julián Légora, Gerardo Tomalino; Horacio Herrera, Christian Barrea; Damián Rotondo; Lucio Bedoya (Ohanián), Martín Viola (Luico Bedoya); José Simes, Eduardo Giaimo (Martín Fissore); Damián Muñoz, Guillermo Bernardi (c), Agustín Rodríguez Araya (Zárate).
England: Jim Mallinder; Jon Sleightholme, Phil de Glanville (c), Nick Greenstock, Adedayo Adebayo; Mike Catt, Kyran Bracken; Chris Sheasby (Tony Diprose); Rory Jenkins, Ben- Clarke; Nigel Redrnan, Martin Haag; Rob Hardwick, Phil Greening, Darren Garforth

24 May

Buenos Aires	23–21	England
Try: Solar; Pen: Cilley (5); Drop: Cilley	Report	Try: Clarke, de Glanville, Mallinder; Pen: King (2)

BACRC Stadium, Los Polvorines
Referee: Ian Rogers (South Africa)

Buenos Aires: Diego Cuesta Silva; Tomás Solari, José Orengo, Eduardo Simone, Octavio Bartolucci; José Cilley, Nicolás Fernández Miranda; Pablo Camerlinckx; Cristián Viel, Ignacio Fernández Lobbe; Roberto Petti, Pedro Sporleder; Marcelo Urbano, Juan José Angelillo (e), Federico Werner.
England: Jim Mallinder; Jon Sleightholme, Nick Greenstock, Phil de Glanville (c)(Kyran Bracken), Adedayo Adebayo; Alex King (Mark Mapletoft), Andy Gomarsall; Tony Diprose; Ben Clarke (Martin Corry), Steve Ojornoh; Nigel Redrnan, Dave Baldwin; Kevin Yates, Richard Cockerill, John Mallett

27 May

Argentina A	17–58	England
Try: Viel, Légora, Cilley; Con: Cilley; Pen: Cilley	Report	Try: Rees (2), Baxendell (2), Gomarsall, Haag, Catt, O'Leary; Con: Mapletoft (6); Pen: Mapletoft (2)

BACRC Stadium, Los Polvorines
Referee: Jonathan Kaplan (South Africa)

Argentina A: Federico Todeschini; Germán Todeschini, Julián Légora, Fernando del Castillo, Federico Schacht; José Cilley (c), Christian Barrea (Leandro Lobrauco); Cristián Viel; Roberto Travaglini, Gonzalo García; José Simes, Guillermo Ugartemendía (Raúl Pérez); Omar Hasan, Mario Ledesma, Fernando Díaz Alberdi (Federico Werner)
England: Mark Mapletoft; Darren O'Leary, Jos Baxendell, Matt Allen, David Rees; Alex King (Mike Catt), Andy Gornarsall; Tony Diprose (e); Rory Jenkins (Steve Ojornoh), Martin Corry; Danny Grewcock, Martin Haag; Darren Garforth, Richard Cockerill, Kevin Yates (Rob Hardwick)

31 May

Argentina	20–46	England
Try: Arbizu, Solar, Quesada; Pen: Quesada; Drop: Quesada	Report	Try: Adebayo (2), Greenstock, Diprose, Catt; Con: Catt (5); Pen: Catt (2)

Ferro Carril Oeste, Buenos Aires
Referee: lan Rogers (South Africa)

Team details

Argentina
England

Argentina: Argentina: Ezequiel Jurado; Tomás Solar¡, Eduardo Simone, Lisandro Arbizu (c), Facundo Soler; Gonzalo Quesada, Nicolás Fernández Miranda; Pablo Camerlinckx, Pablo Bouza, Rolando Martín; Germán Llanes, Pedro Sporleder (Ignacio Fernández Lobbe); Mauricio Reggiardo (Omar Hasan), Federico Méndez (Carlos Promanzio), Roberto Grau
England: Jim Mallinder; Jon Sleigtholme, Phil de Glanville (c), Nick Greenstock, Adedayo Adebayo; Mike Catt, Kyran Bracken; Tony Diprose; Martin Corry (Chris Sheasby), Ben Clarke; Martin Haag, Nigel Redrnan; Darren Garforth, Richard Cockerill (Phil Greening), Kevin Yates

3 June

Cuyo	8–37	England
Try: Brandi; Pen: Gioeni	Report	Try: Mallinder (2), Grewcock, Baxendell, Gamarsall, Mapletoft; Con: Mapletoft (2); Pen: Mapletoft (2)

Independiente Rivadavia, Mendoza
Referee: Johan Meuwesen (South Africa)

Cuyo: Martín Castro; Matías Brandi, Federico Serpa, Leandro Speroni, Sergio Cantú (Enrique Gatti); Adrián Gioeni, Manuel Díaz; Juan Chiapetta; Miguel Bertranou (c), Fermín Rodríguez, Gonzalo Correa Llano, Roberto Marchiori (Carlos Bajach); Federico Stoerman, Juan Pablo Arnut (Alejandro Avila), Federico Bartolini.
England: Mark Mapletoft; Daren O'Leary, Matt Allen, Jos Baxendell, Adedayo Adebayo (Jim Mallinder); Alex King, Andy Gomarsall; Chris Sheasby (c)(Martin Corry); Rory Jenkins, Steve Ojornoh; David Baldwin, Danny Grewcock; Robin Hardwick, Steve Diamond, Will Green

7 June

Argentina	33–13	England
Try: Soler (2), Grau, Simone; Con: Quesada (2); Pen: Quesada (3)	Report	Try: Grewcock, Alex King; Pen: Mapletoft

Ferro Carril Oeste, Buenos Aires
Referee: Jonathan Kaplan (South Africa)

Team details

Argentina
England

Argentina: Ezequiel Jurado; Tomás Solari (German Aristide), Eduardo Simone, Lisandro Arbizu (c), Facundo Soler; Gonzalo Quesada, Nicolás Fernández Miranda; Pablo Camerlinckx; Ignacio Fernández Lobbe, Rolando Martín (Christian Viel); Germán Llanes, Pedro Sporleder; Mauricio Reggiardo (Omar Hasan), Carlos Promanzio, Roberto Grau
England: Jim Mallinder (Alex King); Jon Sleigtholme, Phil de Glanville (c), Nick Greenstock, Adedayo Adebayo (Andy Gomarsall); Mark Mapletoft, Kyran Bracken; Tony Diprose; Rory Jenkins (Chris Sheasby), Ben Clarke; Martin Haag, Danny Grewcock; Darren Garforth, Richard Cockerill, Kevin Yates

=== in Australia ===
12 July

Australia	25–6	England

Football Stadium, Sydney
