= 1994 South Africa rugby union tour of New Zealand =

Summary
P	W	D	L
Total
14	10	1	3
Test match
3	0	1	2
Opponent
P	W	D	L
New Zealand
3	0	1	2

The 1994 South Africa rugby union tour of New Zealand was a series of rugby union matches played in New Zealand by the South Africa national team from June to August 1994. The team played 14 matches in total; 11 against provincial rugby teams and 3 against New Zealand. South Africa won 10 out of the 11 matches against provincial sides, losing to Otago. They lost their first two test matches against New Zealand national and drew the last test. The South Africa coach for the tour was Ian McIntosh. This was South African's first tour to New Zealand since the controversial 1981 South Africa rugby union tour, which was received negatively by New Zealanders due to South Africa's Apartheid regime at the time.

== Matches ==
Scores and results list South Africa's points tally first.

Opposing Team	For	Against	Date	Venue
King Country	46	10	23 June	Owen Delany Park, Taupo
Counties	37	26	25 June	The Stadium, Pukekohe
Wellington	36	26	29 June	Athletic Park, Wellington
Southland	51	15	2 July	Homestead Stadium, Invercargill
Hanan Shield XV	67	19	6 July	Fraser Park, Timaru
New Zealand	14	22	9 July	Carisbrook, Dunedin
Taranaki	16	12	14 July	Rugby Park, New Plymouth
Waikato	38	17	16 July	Rugby Park, Hamilton
Manawatu	47	21	20 July	The Showgrounds Oval, Palmerston North
New Zealand	9	13	23 July	Athletic Park, Wellington
Otago	12	19	27 July	Carisbrook, Dunedin
Canterbury	21	11	30 July	Lancaster Park, Christchurch
Bay of Plenty	33	12	3 August	Rotorua International Stadium, Rotorua
New Zealand	18	18	6 August	Eden Park, Auckland

== Touring party ==
- Coach: Ian McIntosh
- Assistant coach: Gysie Pienaar
- Manager: Jannie Engelbrecht
- Captain: Francois Pienaar

=== Backs ===
Gavin Johnson, Andre Joubert, Theo van Rensburg, Chris Badenhorst, James Small, Cabous van der Westhuizen, Chester Williams, Jannie Claassens, FA Meiring, Japie Mulder, Pieter Muller, Brendan Venter, Hennie le Roux, Lance Sherrell, Johan Roux, Joost van der Westhuizen

=== Forwards ===
Adriaan Richter, Tiaan Strauss, Wahl Bartmann, Ruben Kruger, Francois Pienaar, Rudolf Straeuli, Fritz van Heerden, Mark Andrews, Steve Atherton, Adri Geldenhuys, Krynauw Otto, Nico Wegner, Kobus Wiese, Keith Andrews, Guy Kebble, Ollie le Roux, Johan le Roux, Balie Swart, John Allan
