= Nico Wegner =

South African rugby union footballer

- Born: George Nicolaas Wegner; 3 December 1968 (age 57) Nelspruit, Mpumalanga, South Africa
- Height: 2.02 m (6 ft 8 in)
- Weight: 118 kg (260 lb)
- School: Nelspruit High School
- University: Stellenbosch University

Rugby union career
Amateur team(s)
Years	Team	Apps	(Points)
- Maties
- CA Villeneuve sur Lot
- Parma
- Hamiltons
- Durban Crusaders
Provincial / State sides
Years	Team	Apps	(Points)
1992–1996	Western Province	49	(25)
1997–1999	Natal Sharks	43	(20)
2000–2001	Falcons	21	(0)
Super Rugby
Years	Team	Apps	(Points)
1998–1999	Sharks	9	(0)
International career
Years	Team	Apps	(Points)
1993–1994	South Africa	4	

George Nicolaas 'Nico' Wegner (born 3 December 1968) is a former South African rugby union player.

== Playing career ==
Wegner represented the Lowveld Schools team at the annual Craven Week in 1986 held in Graaff-Reinet. After school he did his national service and then enrolled at Stellenbosch University. He made his debut for the Western Province senior side in 1992. Wegner moved to the Sharks in 1997 and joined the Falcons in 2000.

Wegner made his test debut for South Africa during the 1993 French tour of South Africa, in second test on 3 July 1993 at Ellis Park in Johannesburg. In 1993 Wegner toured with the Springboks to Australia, where he played in all three tests and to Argentina. He also toured as a replacement to New Zealand in 1994. Wegner played in four tests matches and eight tour matches for the Springboks.

=== Test history ===
No.	Opponents	Results (RSA 1st)	Position	Tries	Dates	Venue
1.	France	17–18	Lock		3 Jul 1993	Ellis Park, Johannesburg
2.	Australia	19–12	Lock		31 Jul 1993	Sydney Football Stadium, Sydney
3.	Australia	20–28	Lock		14 Aug 1993	Ballymore Stadium, Brisbane
4.	Australia	12–19	Lock		21 Aug 1993	Sydney Football Stadium, Sydney

== See also ==
- List of South Africa national rugby union players – Springbok no. 587
