= Steve Bates =

England international rugby union footballer & coach

- Born: 4 March 1963 (age 63) Merthyr Tydfil, Wales
- School: St Albans Abbey

Rugby union career
- Position: Scrum-half
Senior career
Years	Team	Apps	(Points)
- London Wasps
International career
Years	Team	Apps	(Points)
1989	England	1	(0)
- Correct as of 15 January 2008
Coaching career
- Years: Team
- 2017-: England national under-20 rugby union team
- 2008: England Saxons (part-time)
- 2007–2010: Newcastle Falcons
- 2006: Scotland A
- 2003–07: Border Reivers
- 1995–2003: Newcastle Falcons
- Correct as of 4 May 2010

Steve Bates (born 4 March 1963) is a rugby coach and retired from former rugby union player. He played at scrum-half for London Wasps and was capped once for the England national rugby union team. He twice worked as a coach at Newcastle Falcons, 1995–2003 and 2007–2010.

== Early life ==
Steven Michael Bates was born on 4 March 1963 in Merthyr Tydfil, Wales. During his days as a player, in the amateur era, Bates was a schoolteacher at Radley College and Lord Wandsworth College in Hampshire.

== Rugby career ==
He played at scrum-half for London Wasps, where he formed a successful partnership with fly-half Rob Andrew. He was capped once for England, against Romania in Bucharest in 1989, and was on England's tour of South Africa in 1994.

In 1995, when Andrew left Wasps to become Director of Rugby at Newcastle Falcons, Bates followed him, becoming the Falcons' head coach. Bates was instrumental in attracting the fly-half Jonny Wilkinson to Newcastle in the summer of 1997, with Wilkinson having previously been a pupil at Lord Wandsworth College where Bates taught. Under Bates, Newcastle were promoted to the Premiership at the end of the 1996–97 season and went on to top the league at the first attempt, in 1997–98; they reached the final of the Tetley's Bitter Cup in 1999 and won the trophy (by then known as the Powergen Cup in 2001. Bates left Newcastle in March 2003.

In 2004 Bates was appointed as head coach of Border Reivers, taking over from New Zealander Tony Gilbert, who was returning home. Bates successfully guided Borders back into the Heineken Cup in 2006–07 and, during his time with the club, also coached Scotland A to the final of the 2006 Churchill Cup, which they lost to the New Zealand Māori, after wins against England Saxons and Canada.

When the Scottish Rugby Union announced that Border Reivers were to be disbanded at the end of the 2006–07 season, Bates was headhunted by Newcastle Falcons to become their Coaching and Technical Director and rejoined the club in June 2007. Bates was sacked by the Falcons in May 2010.

In January 2008, the Rugby Football Union announced the appointment of Bates as head coach of England Saxons on a part-time basis.

In 2011 Bates was appointed the director of sport at Fettes College in Edinburgh. Bates left to become head coach of England Rugby Union Under 20s in March 2017.
