= Tim Rodber =

British Lions & England international rugby union player (born 1969)

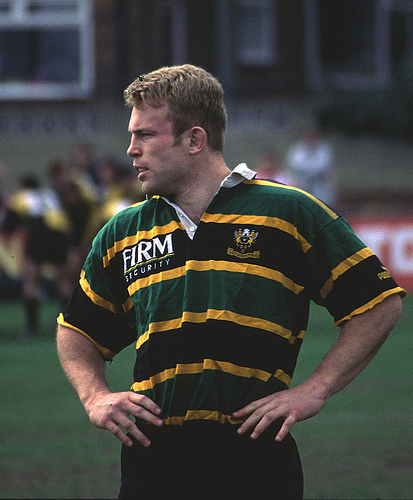
- Born: Timothy Andrew Keith Rodber; 12 July 1969 (age 57) Richmond, Yorkshire, England
- Height: 1.98 m (6 ft 6 in)
- Weight: 111 kg (17 st 7 lb; 245 lb)
- School: Churcher's College
- University: Oxford Brookes University

Rugby union career
- Position: Flanker / Number eight / Lock
Amateur team(s)
Years	Team	Apps	(Points)
- Oxford Old Boys
–	Petersfield RFC		
–	Northampton		
Senior career
Years	Team	Apps	(Points)
1988-2001	Northampton	235	
International career
Years	Team	Apps	(Points)
- England B
1992-1999	England	44	(25)
1997	British and Irish Lions	2	
National sevens team
Years	Team		Comps
1993	England		1993 7s RWC

Timothy Andrew Keith Rodber (born 12 July 1969) is an English former rugby union footballer who played at number eight, flanker or lock for Northampton Saints, England, and the British Lions.

== Background ==
Rodber excelled at rugby from an early age, representing his school as well as local sides Petersfield R.F.C. and Oxford Old Boys RFC (see Oxford Harlequins RFC).

He attended Churcher's College and studied biology at Oxford Polytechnic (now Oxford Brookes University) on Army scholarships.

Rodber was a captain in the Green Howards infantry regiment of the British Army and remained so even after rugby turned professional. He resigned in 2001 after retiring from the sport.

== Playing career ==
In 1987 Rodber joined the Northampton Saints academy and went on to become club captain.

Whilst at Northampton he started in the victorious 2000 Heineken Cup Final as the Saints defeated Munster.

=== International ===
He made his debut for England in the 25–7 victory over Scotland in the 1992 Five Nations Championship.

He was part of the England team that won the 1993 Rugby World Cup Sevens.

On the 1994 England tour of South Africa Rodber played a major role in one of England's best away performances of the decade during the 32–15 First Test win at the Loftus Versfeld Stadium in Pretoria. "Has one ever seen an England team glisten in a ball-game with such a shimmering and sustained diamond brightness?" commented journalist Frank Keating. "Rodber and his forwards were quite stupendous from first to last." In the subsequent tour game against Eastern Province Rodber became one of the few Englishmen in the 1990s to be sent off when he was given a red card for reacting to violence including a stamp on teammate Jon Callard. This incident may have possibly preventing his later selection as England captain. Rodber said the aftermath of the sending off limited his physicality when playing, thus negatively impacted his play, until 1997.

Rodber earned selection to the 1997 British Lions tour to South Africa. He captained the midweek side against Mpumalanga, but was seen initially as behind the other number 8s for the Test side. An injury to Scott Quinnell, and then Eric Miller catching flu, led to Rodber starting the First test. Rodber became one of the stand out performers during the tour. He was selected at No.8 for the first two Tests, both of which the Lions won to take the series 2–1.

Injury dogged Rodber's career. He was selected for England for the 1999 Rugby World Cup and was a replacement for the losing quarter final. Rodber retired at the end of the 2000/01 season.

== Post-retirement ==
Rodber went into management after retiring and held executive posts including as managing director at London-based marketing and communications company Rodber Thorneycroft Ltd, which was acquired by Williams Lea in 2003. He then had stints as regional COO and CEO of Williams Lea. He worked for Middleton Advisors until 2013. In July 2013 he was appointed CEO of global workspace providers, Instant.
