= Ian Hattingh =

South African rugby union player (born 1964)

- Born: 31 October 1964 (age 62) Lindley, Gauteng, South Africa
- Height: 1.88 m (6 ft 2 in)
- Weight: 100 kg (220 lb)
- School: Kroonstad High School
- University: Rand Afrikaans University

Rugby union career
- Position: Prop
Provincial / State sides
Years	Team	Apps	(Points)
1989, 92	Vaal Triangle	22	
1990–91, 93–96	Golden Lions	89	
1997	Falcons	5	
International career
Years	Team	Apps	(Points)
1994	South Africa (tour)	7	(10)

Sebastiaan Jacobus "Ian" Hattingh (born 31 October 1964) is a South African former rugby union player.

== Playing career ==
Hattingh represented Northern Free State at the annual Craven Week tournament for schoolboys. He made his senior provincial debut in 1989 as a flanker and played provincial rugby for Vaal Triangle, Transvaal (later renamed the Golden Lions) and the Falcons. He made a successful transition from flanker to the frontrow during 1994. At the end of the 1994 season, he toured with the Springboks to Britain and Ireland. Hattingh did not play in any test matches but played in seven tour matches, scoring two tries for the Springboks.

== See also ==
- List of South Africa national rugby union players – Springbok no. 623
