= Franco Smith =

South African rugby union coach and former player (born 1972)

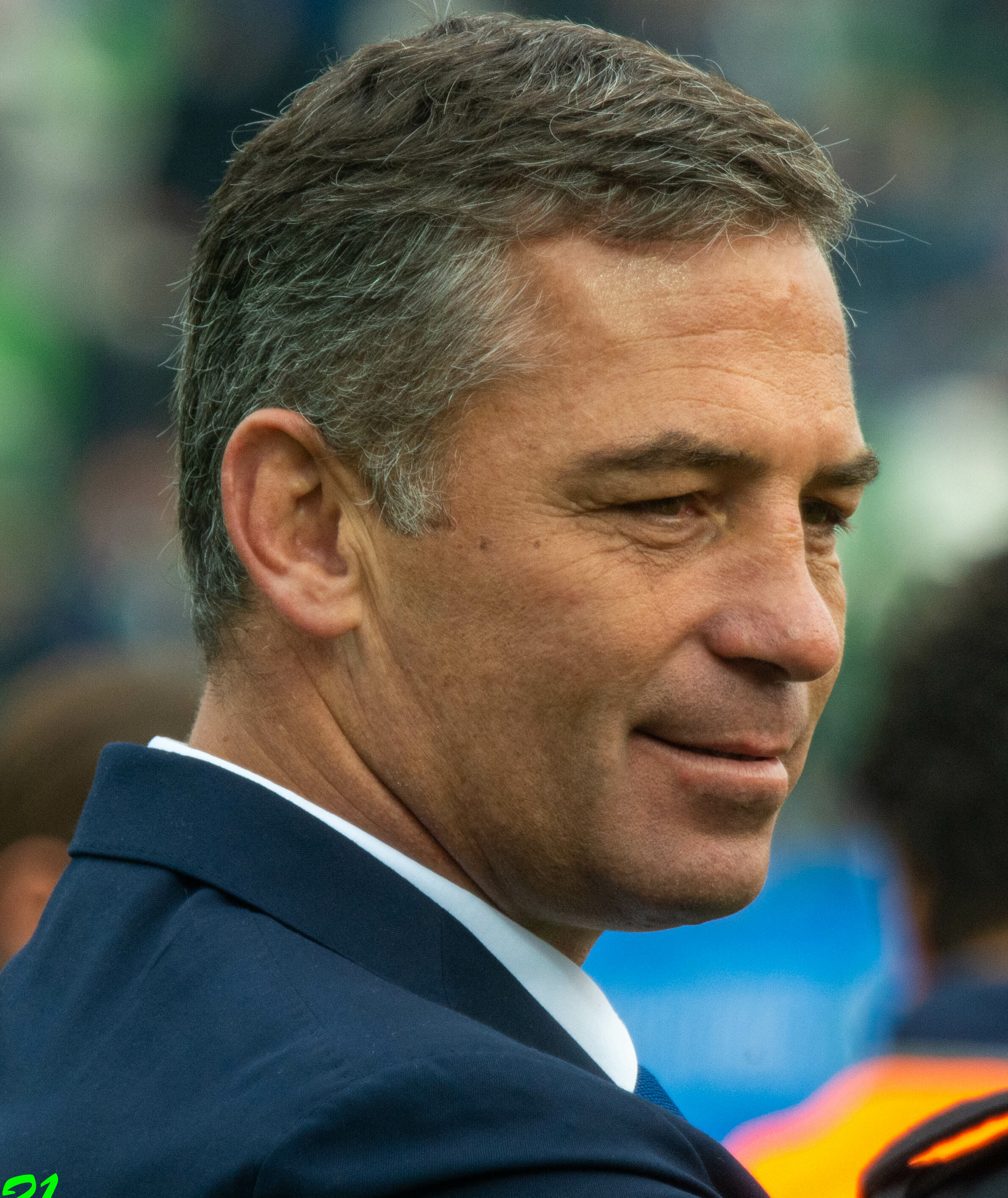
- Full name: Petrus Francois Smith
- Born: 29 July 1972 (age 54) Lichtenburg, South Africa
- Height: 1.83 m (6 ft 0 in)
- Weight: 89 kg (14 st 0 lb; 196 lb)
- School: Hoërskool Sand du Plessis, Bloemfontein
- University: University of the Free State
- Notable relative(s): Franco Smith (son); Jean Smith (son)

Rugby union career
- Position: Fly-half / Centre
Senior career
Years	Team	Apps	(Points)
1992–1995	Free State Cheetahs	16	
1996–1997	Griquas	40	(359)
1998–99, 2002	Bulls		(136)
1998–2000	Blue Bulls	27	
1999–2000	Newport	27	(38)
2001–2002	Pumas		
2001–2002	Rugby Bologna 1928	6	(10)
2003–2006	Treviso	60	(55)
- Correct as of 8 May 2015
International career
Years	Team	Apps	(Points)
1996–1999	South Africa (tour)	9	(62)
1996–1999	South Africa (test)	9	(23)
- Correct as of 19 May 2021
Coaching career
- Years: Team
- 2005–2007: Free State Cheetahs (assistant)
- 2007–2013: Treviso
- 2014–2015: Cheetahs (assistant)
- 2014: Free State Cheetahs (assistant)
- 2015: UFS Shimlas
- 2015–2019: Free State Cheetahs
- 2015–2019: Cheetahs
- 2019–2021: Italy
- 2021–2022: Italy (Head of High Performance)
- 2022-: Glasgow Warriors

Petrus Francois Smith (born 29 July 1972 in Lichtenburg, South Africa) is a former South African international rugby union player. He is now the head coach for Glasgow Warriors. His regular playing position was fly-half or centre.

== Playing career ==
=== Youth ===
Smith went to Hoërskool Sand du Plessis in Bloemfontein, where he earned a selection to the Free State Under-18 Craven Week team in 1990. In 1991 and 1992, he regularly appeared for the Free State Under-20 side, as well as for the University of the Free State's rugby team, Shimlas. He also captained a South African Universities team that played against a South African Army XV.

=== Free State Cheetahs ===
He made his first class debut in September 1992, playing at centre for the Free State's match against Western Transvaal in Round Two of the 1992 Lion Cup competition. He remained with the Bloemfontein-based outfit until 1995, mainly appearing for their B team or as a replacement.

=== Griquas ===
In 1996, Smith joined Kimberley-based side Griquas. After one season playing for Griquas, Smith played himself into Springbok contention and was named in a 36-man squad at the end of the year. He toured with the Springboks to Argentina, Wales and France and featured in several tour matches, but did not feature in any test matches.

=== Bulls / Blue Bulls ===
At the start of 1998, Springbok coach Nick Mallett requested that Smith was loaned from the Cats to the Bulls for the 1998 Super 12 season. He quickly established himself in the team and was also the leading South African points scorer at a point during the competition before a knee injury forced him to miss the final four rounds. He also made the move to Pretoria a permanent one and represented the Blue Bulls in the 1998 Currie Cup. He also played for the Bulls in the 1999 Super 12 season and for the Blue Bulls in the 1999 Currie Cup.

=== Newport ===
In August 1999, it was announced that Smith would join Welsh Premier Division side Newport. He made 27 appearances for them, scoring 38 points.

=== Return to Bulls / Blue Bulls ===
After just one season in Wales, Smith returned to South Africa and rejoined the Blue Bulls, representing them in the 2000 Currie Cup. He once again played for the Bulls in the 2001 Super 12 season.

=== Pumas / Bologna / Bulls ===
He moved to Witbank, where he played for the Pumas in the 2001 Currie Cup, before he had a short spell at Italian side Bologna. He returned to play for the Pumas for the 2002 season and was once again included in the Bulls' squad for the 2002 Super 12 season.

=== Treviso ===
Smith returned to Italy to join Treviso at the end of 2002. He remained there for four seasons, making 60 appearances for the side. During his time at the club, he won the National Championship of Excellence with them in 2002–2003 and in 2003–2004 and also won the Coppa Italia in 2005.

=== Return to Free State Cheetahs ===
He returned to South Africa and to the side where it all started, the Free State Cheetahs, where he was included in their squad for the 2005 Currie Cup Premier Division, but failed to make an appearance. He retired at the end of 2005 to become the backline coach for the Free State Cheetahs.

=== South Africa ===
Smith played nine test matches for South Africa. He made his debut on 6 December 1997 against Scotland and his last test match was on 7 August 1999 against New Zealand.

==== Test history ====
No.	Opposition	Result (SA 1st)	Position	Points	Date	Venue
1.	Scotland	68–10	Replacement	5 (1 try)	6 Dec 1997	Murrayfield, Edinburgh
2.	Ireland	37–13	Replacement		13 Jun 1998	Free State Stadium, Bloemfontein
3.	Ireland	33–0	Flyhalf		20 Jun 1998	Loftus Versfeld, Pretoria
4.	Wales	96–13	Flyhalf	5 (1 try)	27 Jun 1998	Loftus Versfeld, Pretoria
5.	New Zealand	13–3	Replacement		25 Jul 1998	Athletic Park, Wellington
6.	New Zealand	24–23	Replacement		15 Aug 1998	Kings Park, Durban
7.	Australia	29–15	Replacement		22 Aug 1998	Ellis Park, Johannesburg
8.	Wales	28–20	Centre	13 (2 conv, 3 pen)	14 Nov 1998	Wembley, London
9.	New Zealand	18–34	Centre		7 Aug 1999	Loftus Versfeld, Pretoria

Legend: pen = penalty (3 pts.); conv = conversion (2 pts.), drop = drop kick (3 pts.).

== Coaching career ==
=== Free State Cheetahs ===
His first foray into coaching was to become the backline coach of the Cheetahs in 2006.

=== Treviso ===
After 18 months in that job, he returned to Italy to take over as head coach of former side Treviso. He guided them to two National Championship of Excellence titles in 2008–2009 and in 2009–2010, as well as one Coppa Italia in 2010 and one Italian Supercup in 2009. He resigned in December 2013.

=== Shimlas / Free State Cheetahs / Cheetahs ===
Upon his return to South Africa, he was re-appointed in his former role as backline coach of the Cheetahs. He was also appointed as the head coach of university side UFS Shimlas and he guided them to their first ever Varsity Cup championship in his first season in charge of the side.

In May 2015, it was announced that he would take over as head coach of the Free State Cheetahs. A mere four days later, following incumbent head coach Naka Drotské's decision to retire, Smith was also named as head coach of their affiliated Super Rugby side, the Cheetahs.

=== Italy ===
On 21 November 2019, Franco Smith was named as Italy's interim head coach following the resignation of Conor O'Shea. Smith coached the team during their 2020 Six Nations Championship campaign. He appointment was made permanent on 1 June 2020. On 19 May 2021, it was announced that Smith would step up to a new role as Head of High Performance focusing on all levels of domestic and international rugby for the Italian federation. He was replaced as head coach by Kieran Crowley.

=== Glasgow Warriors ===
On 2 August 2022 it was announced that Smith would be the Head Coach of Glasgow Warriors, replacing their former coach Danny Wilson. Smith said of the move: "I have followed Glasgow for a long time, since coaching at Benetton when they joined the PRO12 in 2010, and the way they play has always appealed to me because their style is embraced by the fans." Glasgow Warriors were crowned United Rugby Championship winners in the 2023-2024 season after beating Bulls in the final at Loftus Versfeld.

Sporting positions
Preceded by (Ireland) Conor O'Shea	Head coach of Italy national rugby union team 2019–2021	Succeeded by (New Zealand) Kieran Crowley
