= Elandré van der Bergh =

South African rugby union player

- Born: 9 December 1966 (age 59) Pretoria, South Africa
- Height: 1.97 m (6 ft 6 in)
- Weight: 110 kg (243 lb)
- School: Framesby High School, Port Elizabeth

Rugby union career
- Position(s): Flanker, Lock
Provincial / State sides
Years	Team	Apps	(Points)
1989–1996	Eastern Province	85	
Super Rugby
Years	Team	Apps	(Points)
1998	Bulls	8	
International career
Years	Team	Apps	(Points)
1994	South Africa	1	

Elandré van der Bergh (born 9 December 1966) is a South African former rugby union player.

== Playing career ==
Van der Bergh was born in Pretoria and schooled in Port Elizabeth. He made his provincial debut for the Eastern Province in 1989 and continued to play 85 matches for the union.

Van der Bergh made his test debut for the Springboks in 1994 against the Argentina at Ellis Park in Johannesburg as a replacement for Tiaan Strauss. In 1994 he toured with the Springboks to Britain and Ireland. In addition to his one test match, he also played seven tour matches and scored 1 try for the Springboks.

=== Test history ===
No.	Opposition	Result (SA 1st)	Position	Tries	Date	Venue
1.	Argentina	46–26	Replacement		15 Oct 1994	Ellis Park, Johannesburg

== See also ==
- List of South Africa national rugby union players – Springbok no. 621
