= Andrew Aitken (rugby union) =

South African rugby union player (born 1968)

- Born: Andrew Douglas Aitken; 10 June 1968 (age 58) Durban, KwaZulu-Natal, South Africa
- Height: 1.85 m (6 ft 1 in)
- Weight: 99 kg (218 lb)
- School: Durban High School
- University: University of Natal; University of Cape Town; University of Oxford

Rugby union career
- Position: Loose-forward
Senior career
Years	Team	Apps	(Points)
1994	Watsonian FC		
Provincial / State sides
Years	Team	Apps	(Points)
1988–90	Natal	46	
1991–94, 97–98	Western Province	79	(60)
Super Rugby
Years	Team	Apps	(Points)
1998	Stormers	6	(15)
International career
Years	Team	Apps	(Points)
1997–1998	South Africa	7	
National sevens team
Years	Team		Comps
1994	Scotland 7s		1

Andrew Douglas Aitken (born 10 June 1968) is a South African former rugby union player.

== Playing career ==
Aitken made his senior provincial debut for Natal in 1988 and in 1990 was part of the Currie Cup winning team. From 1991 to 1994 he played for Western Province and also captained the team. During 1993 he had the opportunity to further his studies at the University of Oxford and during his time there, he played in the annual varsity match against University of Cambridge. After also playing for Watsonian in Edinburgh he returned to Western Province in 1997, helping the team to win the 1997 Currie Cup.

Aitken made his test debut for the Springboks as a replacement, against France at Parc des Princes in Paris. His first start for the Springboks, was the following week against England at Twickenham. He played a further five Test matches for the Springboks and was on the winning side each time. He also played in two tour matches.

=== Test history ===
No.	Opposition	Result (SA 1st)	Position	Tries	Date	Venue
1.	France	52–10	Replacement		22 Nov 1997	Parc des Princes, Paris
2.	England	29–11	Flank		29 Nov 1997	Twickenham, London
3.	Ireland	33–0	Replacement		20 Jun 1998	Loftus Versfeld, Pretoria
4.	Wales	96–13	Replacement		27 Jun 1998	Loftus Versfeld, Pretoria
5.	New Zealand	13–3	Flank		25 Jul 1998	Athletic Park, Wellington
6.	New Zealand	24–23	Replacement		15 Aug 1998	Kings Park, Durban
7.	Australia	29–15	Replacement		22 Aug 1998	Ellis Park, Johannesburg

== Accolades ==
Aitken was voted as one of the five SA Young Players of the Year for 1990, along with Jannie Claassens, Bernard Fourie, Ian MacDonald and Theo Jansen van Rensburg.

== See also ==
- List of South Africa national rugby union players – Springbok no. 658
