= Phillip Schutte =

South African rugby union footballer

- Born: Phillipus Jacobus Wilhelmus Schutte; 7 October 1969 (age 57) Pretoria, Gauteng, South Africa
- Height: 2.01 m (6 ft 7 in)
- Weight: 120 kg (265 lb)
- School: High School Voortrekkerhoogte

Rugby union career
- Position: Lock
Provincial / State sides
Years	Team	Apps	(Points)
1990–1993	Northern Transvaal	58	
1994–1996	Transvaal	51	
1997	Western Province	11	
2000–2001	Border Bulldogs	26	
International career
Years	Team	Apps	(Points)
1994	South Africa	2	(0)

Phillipus Jacobus Wilhelmus Schutte (born 7 October 1969) is a South African former professional rugby union player who played as a lock.

== Playing career ==
As a schoolboy, Schutte represented Northern Transvaal at the annual Craven Week tournament and after school, played for the Northern Transvaal under–20 team. He made his debut for the Northern Transvaal senior side in 1990 and also played for Transvaal, Western Province and the Border Bulldogs.

Schutte toured with the Springboks to Britain and France in 1992 and in 1994 to Britain and Ireland, playing in the two test matches. His debut was against Scotland on 19 November 1994 and he then played against Wales on 26 November 1994. He also played in six tour matches for the Springboks.

=== Test history ===
No.	Opposition	Result (SA 1st)	Position	Tries	Date	Venue
1.	Scotland	34–10	Lock		19 Nov 1994	Murrayfield, Edinburgh
2.	Wales	20–12	Lock		26 Nov 1994	Cardiff Arms Park, Cardiff

== See also ==
- List of South Africa national rugby union players – Springbok no. 582
