= Sand du Plessis High School =

Coordinates: 29.1359°S 26.2019°E

Hoërskool Sand du Plessis
- Bloemfontein, Free State, 9301; South Africa

Information
- Type: Public & Boarding
- Motto: Ek Glo (I Believe)
- Established: 1970; 56 years ago
- School district: District 9
- Grades: 8–12
- Gender: Boys & Girls
- Language: Afrikaans
- Schedule: 07:30 - 14:00
- Hours in school day: 6 hours, 30 minutes, 45 seconds
- Colours: Magenta, Pearl White, Uno Yellow
- Website: www.sannies.co.za

Hoërskool Sand du Plessis is a secondary school in Bloemfontein, Free State, South Africa. This public high school was founded in 1970, when it split off from the lower school. Both boys and girls are taught here.

== Name and symbolism ==
Like Sand du Plessis Theatre which is also located in Bloemfontein, the school is named after Sand du Plessis (1908-1994). He was one of the former administrators of the Orange Free State (known since 1995 simply as “Free State”).

The nickname of this school and its learners (students) is Sannies. An open book appears as the dominant image on the school badge. The open book symbolizes the faith of the Afrikaner son and daughter. The horn depicted on the badge suggests an Afrikaner identity with a message of "being ready", while the anvil portrays the shaping power of labour. The motto "I believe" confirms the ideals that are intended to be nurtured by this school.

== History ==
Some significant dates in the school's history are these:

- 25 January 1966: The secondary section of the combined higher and lower school Sand du Plessis opens with 60 learners.
- 19 January 1967: Mr. Adriaan Reyneke, former deputy director of education, accepts service as head of the combined school.
- 20 January 1970: The official division of the higher and primary school comes into effect with Mr. Reyneke as head of the high school.
- November 1970: A group of 28 learners are the first to take the matric examination.
- 24 July 1973: The school building is occupied and a new era takes effect.
- January 1975: Mr. Jan F. Stemmet, deputy principal, takes over the reins as principal and serves the school until December 1985.
- 1986: Mr. G.J.U. Naude, deputy principal, takes over for the whole year as principal.
- January 1987: Mr. Giel de Villiers accepts service as principal. He left the school at the end of 1991.
- October 1991: An oral reunion is presented at the school.
- 1992: Mr. A.K. Smith, deputy principal, serves as principal for the whole year.
- January 1993: Mr. Johan C. Lamprecht accepts service as principal. During this year the OVS Directorraids will be won for rugby, choral singing and disk shooting. He completes his service on 31 December 2007.
- January 2008: Mr. Roy J. Doubell starts as head of the school.
- June 2014: Mr. F.G. Fouché is appointed as acting principal.
- February 2015: Mr. Willem du Buisson appointed as principal.
- January 2020: Fiftieth anniversary of school.

== Notable alumni ==
- Franco Smith, rugby player.
- Morné Steyn, rugby player.

== See also ==
- List of South Africa national under-18 rugby union team players
