= History of women's rugby union matches between New Zealand and South Africa =

South Africa and New Zealand have played 2 games against each other, with New Zealand winning 2, South Africa winning 0 and a draw between the 0 sides. Their first match-up was at the 2010 Women's Rugby World Cup in England, with New Zealand winning (55–3) in their pool game.

== Summary ==
=== Overall ===
Details	Played	Won by South Africa	Won by New Zealand	Drawn	South Africa points	New Zealand points
In South Africa	1	0	1	0	20	52
In New Zealand	0	0	0	0	0	0
Neutral venue	2	0	2	0	20	101
Overall	2	0	2	0	40	153

=== Record ===
Note: Date shown in brackets indicates when the record was or last set.

Record	South Africa	New Zealand
Longest winning streak	N/A	3 (20 August 2010–Present)
Largest points for
Home	N/A	N/A
Away	N/A	32 (5 September 2026)
Neutral venue	N/A	N/A
Largest winning margin
Home	N/A	N/A
Away	N/A	32 (5 September 2026)
Neutral venue	N/A	52 (20 August 2010)

== Results ==
No.	Date	Venue	Score	Winner	Competition
1	20 August 2010	Surrey Sports Park, Guildford, South East England	55–3	New Zealand	2010 Women's Rugby World Cup
2	13 September 2025	Sandy Park, Exeter, England	46–17	New Zealand	2025 Women's Rugby World Cup
3	5 September 2026	FNB Stadium, Johannesburg	20–52	New Zealand	2026 Rugby's Greatest Rivalry

== See also ==
- History of rugby union matches between New Zealand and South Africa
