= Ian MacDonald (rugby union) =

South Africa international rugby union footballer

- Born: Ian MacDonald; 22 February 1968 (age 58) Pretoria, Gauteng
- Height: 1.95 m (6 ft 5 in)
- Weight: 112 kg (247 lb)
- School: Rhodesfield Technical High School, Kempton Park

Rugby union career
Amateur team(s)
Years	Team	Apps	(Points)
- Germiston Simmer
Provincial / State sides
Years	Team	Apps	(Points)
1990–1998	Transvaal	145	
Super Rugby
Years	Team	Apps	(Points)
1998	Northern Bulls	3	
International career
Years	Team	Apps	(Points)
1992–1995	South Africa	6	

Ian MacDonald (born 22 February 1968) is a South African former rugby union player.

== Playing career ==
MacDonald made his debut for Transvaal in 1990 and played 145 matches for Transvaal/Golden Lions/Lions during his career. He was a member of the Transvaal team that won the Currie Cup in 1993.

MacDonald made his test debut for the Springboks against the New Zealand All Blacks on 15 Augustus 1992 at Ellis Park in Johannesburg. He played in six test matches for the Springboks and also played in twelve tour matches, scoring five tries.

=== Test history ===
No.	Opponents	Results (RSA 1st)	Position	Tries	Dates	Venue
1.	New Zealand	24–27	Flanker		15 August 1992	Ellis Park, Johannesburg
2.	Australia	3–26	Flanker		22 August 1992	Newlands, Cape Town
3.	France	20–20	Flanker		26 June 1993	Kings Park Stadium, Durban
4.	Australia	12–19	Flanker		21 August 1993	Sydney Football Stadium (SFG), Sydney
5.	England	27–9	Flanker		11 June 1994	Newlands, Cape Town
6.	Samoa	60–8	Replacement		13 April 1995	Ellis Park, Johannesburg

== Accolades ==
MacDonald was voted as one of the five Young Players of the Year for 1990, along with Andrew Aitken, Jannie Claassens, Bernard Fourie and Theo van Rensburg

== See also ==
- List of South Africa national rugby union players – Springbok no. 565
