= Johan le Roux =

South African rugby union player

- Born: Johan Heindrich Schroeder le Roux; 15 November 1961 (age 64) Vereeniging, Gauteng
- Height: 1.82 m (6 ft 0 in)
- Weight: 114 kg (251 lb)

Rugby union career
Provincial / State sides
Years	Team	Apps	(Points)
1988–1994, 1996	Transvaal	100	
1997–1998	Falcons	33	
1999	Blue Bulls	17	
Super Rugby
Years	Team	Apps	(Points)
1998–1999	Bulls	16	(0)
International career
Years	Team	Apps	(Points)
1994	South Africa	3	(0)

Johan Heindrich Schroeder le Roux (born 15 November 1961) is a former South African rugby union player.

== Playing career ==
Le Roux played the majority of his senior provincial rugby for Transvaal and represented the union in 100 matches. He was part of the strong 1993 Transvaal side that won the Super 10 against Auckland. He also played for the Falcons and the Blue Bulls. He made his test match debut for the Springboks against the England on 11 June 1994 at the Newlands in Cape Town. He toured with the Springboks to New Zealand in 1994, playing in two test matches and four tour matches. After the Test match against New Zealand at Athletic Park, Le Roux was cited for biting the ear of All Black captain, Sean Fitzpatrick. He was subsequently suspended for 18 months, effectively ending his international rugby career.

=== Test history ===
No.	Opponents	Results (SA 1st)	Position	Tries	Dates	Venue
1.	England	27–9	Tighthead prop		11 Jun 1994	Newlands, Cape Town
2.	New Zealand	14–22	Tighthead prop		9 Jul 1994	Carisbrook, Dunedin
3.	New Zealand	9–13	Tighthead prop		23 Jul 1994	Athletic Park, Wellington

== See also ==
- List of South Africa national rugby union players – Springbok no. 608
