= Tommie Laubscher =

South African rugby union footballer

- Born: Thomas Gerbach Laubscher; 8 October 1963 Vredenburg, Western Cape, South Africa
- Died: 26 May 2007 (aged 43) Vredenburg, Western Cape, South Africa
- Height: 1.85 m (6 ft 1 in)
- Weight: 115 kg (254 lb)
- School: Vredenburg High School, Vredenburg

Rugby union career
- Position: Tighthead prop
Provincial / State sides
Years	Team	Apps	(Points)
1990–1992	Boland	37	(0)
1993–1997	Western Province	60	(0)
International career
Years	Team	Apps	(Points)
1994–1995	South Africa	6	(0)

Thomas Gerbach Laubscher (8 October 1963 – 26 May 2007) was a South African rugby union player who played at tighthead prop.

== Playing career ==
Laubscher played for the Boland schools team at the Craven Week tournament and made his provincial rugby debut for Boland in 1990 at the age of 27. In 1993 he moved to Western Province and won the Currie Cup with Western Province in 1997.

Laubscher made his Springbok debut in 1994 against Argentina at the Boet Erasmus Stadium in Port Elizabeth. He toured with the Springboks to Britain at the end of 1994 and to Europe and Britain in 1995. Laubscher played six test matches and six tour matches for the Springboks, and was known as an exceptionally strong scrummager.

=== Test history ===
No.	Opposition	Result (SA 1st)	Position	Tries	Date	Venue
1.	Argentina	42–22	Tighthead prop		8 Oct 1994	Boet Erasmus Stadium, Port Elizabeth
2.	Argentina	46–26	Tighthead prop		15 Oct 1994	Ellis Park, Johannesburg
3.	Scotland	34–10	Tighthead prop		19 Nov 1994	Murrayfield, Edinburgh
4.	Wales	20–12	Tighthead prop		26 Nov 1994	Cardiff Arms Park, Cardiff
5.	Italy	40–21	Tighthead prop		12 Nov 1995	Stadio Olimpico, Rome
6.	England	24–14	Tighthead prop		18 Nov 1995	Twickenham, London

== Death ==
Laubscher died in a road accident when he and his son, stopped to help a driver who had hit a cow in foggy weather conditions, when he was hit by another vehicle.

== See also ==
- List of South Africa national rugby union players – Springbok no. 620
