= Lindley, Gauteng =

Lindley
- Location within Gauteng Location within South Africa
- Coordinates: 25.93114°S 27.90528°E
- Country: South Africa
- Province: Gauteng
- District: West Rand
- Municipality: Mogale City
- Main Place: Mogale City NU

Area
  - Total: 16.24 km^{2} (6.27 sq mi)

Population (2011)
  - Total: 1,475
  - Density: 90.83/km^{2} (235.2/sq mi)

Racial makeup (2011)
  - Black African: 93.4%
  - Coloured: 1.5%
  - Indian/Asian: 0.1%
  - White: 5.1%

First languages (2011)
  - Tswana: 16.5%
  - Northern Sotho: 15.1%
  - Zulu: 14.5%
  - Tsonga: 10.0%
  - Other: 44.0%
- Time zone: UTC+2 (SAST)
- Postal code (street): 9630
- PO box: 9630
- Area code: 058

Lindley SH is a sub place north of Johannesburg, South Africa.

The acronym SH in the title means "small holdings" (farming sub units mainly for agricultural use). Since the area's population consists of 1,000+ Black African, it can be seen at 25°56′3″S 27°53′55″E on a geomap that pockets of the area are occupied by people living in informal shack dwellings.

It is located adjacent to Lanseria International Airport and Diepsloot, on the banks of the Crocodile River. The R512 and R540 roads intersect the area.
