= Coenraad Breytenbach =

South Africa rugby player

Personal information
- Born: 10 November 1970 (age 55) Middelburg, Mpumalanga, South Africa

Playing information

Rugby union
- Position: Centre, scrum-half
Club
Years	Team	Pld	T	G	FG	P
	Blue Bulls
1996–98	Northern Transvaal Bulls
	Total	0	0	0	0	0
Representative
Years	Team	Pld	T	G	FG	P
2002	Russia	2	0	0	0	0

Rugby league
- Position: Five-eighth
Representative
Years	Team	Pld	T	G	FG	P
2000	South Africa	1	1	0	0	4

Coenraad Lodewyk Breytenbach (born 10 November 1970) is a South African former rugby union and rugby league footballer who played in the 1990s and 2000s. He represented South Africa at rugby league in the 2000 Rugby League World Cup and Russia in rugby union.

== Background ==
He was born in Middelburg, South Africa.

== Playing career ==
Breytenbach played rugby union for the Northern Transvaal Blue Bulls and was tipped to eventually play for the South Africa (RU).

Between 1996 and 1998 Breytenbach played for the Northern Transvaal Bulls in the Super 12 competition.

In 2000, Breytenbach was part of the South African squad at the Rugby League World Cup. He played in one match at five eighth, scoring a try against Tonga.

In 2001 Breytenbach played for the Blue Bulls in the Currie Cup.

In 2002 he played in a European Nations Cup match for Russia (RU) against Georgia along with two other South African born players, sparking a protest from Georgia.
