= FA Meiring =

South African rugby union player (born 1967)

- Born: Francois Anton Meiring; 24 August 1967 (age 59) Somerset East, Eastern Cape
- Height: 1.82 m (6 ft 0 in)
- Weight: 92 kg (203 lb)
- School: Gill College, Somerset East

Rugby union career
Provincial / State sides
Years	Team	Apps	(Points)
- Eastern Province
14	Northern Transvaal	105	(53)
International career
Years	Team	Apps	(Points)
1994	South Africa		

Francois Anton Meiring (born 24 August 1967) is a South African former rugby union player.

== Playing career ==
As a schoolboy, Meiring represented North Eastern Cape at 1984-1986 Craven Week tournament after which he was selected for the South African Schools team. He made his senior provincial debut in 1990 and played provincial rugby for Eastern Province and Northern Transvaal. In 1994 he toured with the Springboks to New Zealand. Meiring did not play in any test matches but played in seven tour matches, scoring two tries for the Springboks.

== See also ==
- List of South Africa national rugby union players – Springbok no. 612
- List of South Africa national under-18 rugby union team players
