= Schutte Bekker =

South African rugby union player

- Born: 19 October 1971 (age 55) Nelspruit, South Africa
- Height: 1.93 m (6 ft 4 in)
- Weight: 105 kg (231 lb)
- School: Nelspruit High School

Rugby union career
- Position: Loose-forward
Provincial / State sides
Years	Team	Apps	(Points)
1993–1994	Western Transvaal	59	
1995–2000	Northern Transvaal	60	
Super Rugby
Years	Team	Apps	(Points)
1998–2000	Bulls	27	(15)
International career
Years	Team	Apps	(Points)
1997	South Africa	1	

Schutte Bekker (born 19 October 1971) is a South African former rugby union player.

== Playing career ==
Bekker represented Lowveld at the 1989 and 1990 Craven Week tournaments for schoolboys. He made his provincial debut for Western Transvaal in 1993 and in 1995 he moved to Northern Transvaal.

Bekker played in one test match for the Springboks, as a replacement against Australia during the 1997 Tri Nations Series at Loftus Versfeld in Pretoria. He also played in two tour matches, scoring three tries for the Springboks.

=== Test history ===
No.	Opposition	Result (SA 1st)	Position	Tries	Date	Venue
1.	Australia	61–22	Replacement		23 Aug 1997	Loftus Versfeld, Pretoria

== See also ==
- List of South Africa national rugby union players – Springbok no. 639
