= Theo van Rensburg =

South African rugby union player

Theo Jansen van Rensburg
- Born: Jan Theodorus Jansen van Rensburg; 26 August 1967 (age 59) Carletonville, South Africa
- Height: 1.75 m (5 ft 9 in)
- Weight: 78 kg (172 lb)
- School: Potchefstroom Gimnasium
- University: University of Pretoria

Rugby union career
- Position(s): Full-back, Wing, Fly-half, Centre
Amateur team(s)
Years	Team	Apps	(Points)
1988	University of Pretoria		
1992	RAU		
1993–1994	Wanderers		
1995–1996	Pretoria		
Senior career
Years	Team	Apps	(Points)
1999–2000	→ FC Grenoble, France	3	(9)
1995–1996	Northern Transvaal	53	(131)
1992–1994	Transvaal	34	(513)
1997	Eastern Province	5	(38)
1998–2000	South Western Districts	63	
International career
Years	Team	Apps	(Points)
1992–94	South Africa	7	(40)

Jan Theodorus Jansen van Rensburg (born 26 August 1967, in Carletonville) is a South African former rugby union player. He won seven caps for South Africa, and usually played as a fullback.

== Playing career ==
=== Provincial rugby ===
Van Rensburg represented Western Transvaal at the Craven Week for high schools in 1984 and 1985 and also represented Western Transvaal at under–20 level. In 1989 he made his senior provincial debut for Northern Transvaal. Van Rensburg relocated to Transvaal in 1992 and made his Springboks debut as a Transvaal player. He moved back to Northern Transvaal in 1995, after which he also played for Eastern Province and South Western Districts.

=== Springboks ===
He played his first test match for the Springboks on 15 Augustus 1992 against New Zealand at Ellis Park in Johannesburg. At the end of 1992 Van Rensburg toured with the Springboks to France and England, but played in only one test on tour, that against England. Van Rensburg also toured with the Springboks to Australia in 1993 and as a replacement, to New Zealand in 1994. His last test was on 23 July 1994 against New Zealand at Athletic Park in Wellington. He scored 40 points (12 penalties, 2 conversions) in test matches for the Springboks and also played in 15 tour matches scoring 142 points (7 tries, 19 conversions, 22 penalties and 1 drop goal).

== Honours ==
Van Rensburg was voted as one of the five Young Players of the Year for 1990, along with Andrew Aitken, Jannie Claassens, Bernard Fourie and Ian MacDonald.

== See also ==
- List of South Africa national rugby union players – Springbok no. 558
