= Phil de Glanville =

England international rugby union player

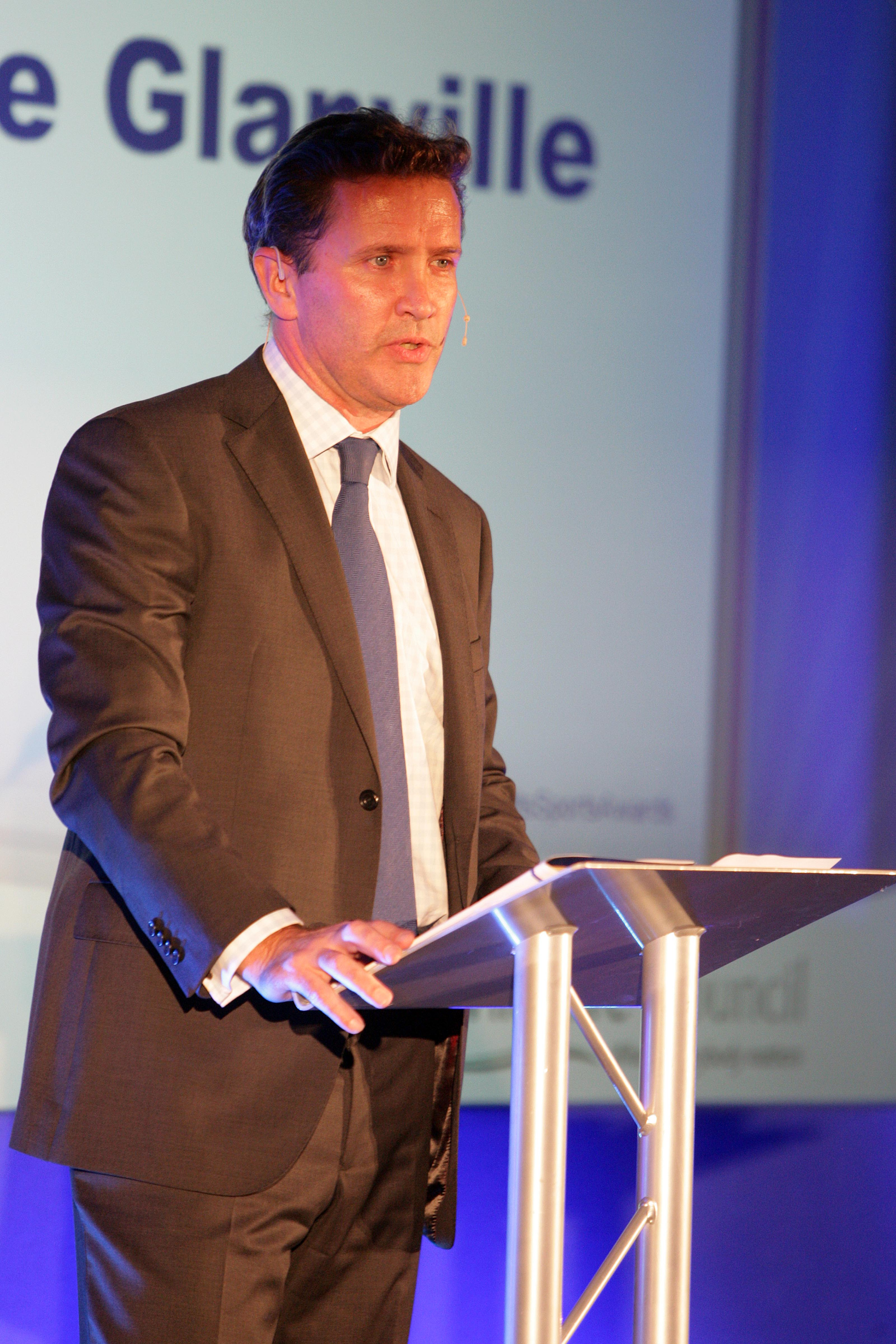
- De Glanville hosting the Wiltshire Sports Awards in 2015
- Born: Philip Ranulph de Glanville; 1 October 1968 (age 58) Loughborough, England
- Height: 5 ft 11 in (1.80 m)
- Weight: 13 st 11 lb (193 lb; 88 kg)
- School: Bryanston School and Mount House School, now known as Mount Kelly
- University: Durham University; Oxford University

Rugby union career
- Position: Centre
Amateur team(s)
Years	Team	Apps	(Points)
1986–1989	Durham University RFC		
1989–1990	Oxford University RFC		
Senior career
Years	Team	Apps	(Points)
1989–2001	Bath	202	(250)
International career
Years	Team	Apps	(Points)
1992–1999	England	38	(40)

Philip Ranulph de Glanville (born 1 October 1968 in Loughborough) is a former English rugby union player who played at centre for Bath and England.

== Rugby career ==
De Glanville played for Durham University while an Economics and Politics student, then at Oxford University won a Blue with Oxford University RFC and also represented England U21s and England Students.

De Glanville joined Bath in 1989 and captained them to a league and cup double in 1996, partnering Jeremy Guscott in the centre for this club that season, as well as many others. He played 201 times for Bath over a 12-year career, scoring 53 tries. He started for Bath in the victorious 1998 Heineken Cup Final as they defeated Brive.

He made his England debut as a replacement in the match against the Springboks in 1992. Many of De Glanville's international caps were earned in a replacement role, as the incumbent centres were Will Carling (long-serving England captain) and Jeremy Guscott. De Glanville is seen as likely to have won many more caps if it weren't for this firmly entrenched Carling-Guscott combination, a pairing solidified by early Carling-Guscott successes like the 1991 Rugby World Cup.

In autumn 1996, coach Jack Rowell appointed de Glanvile as England captain following Will Carling's decision to step-down following England's 1996 Five Nations Championship win. However, there was criticism of his inclusion in the starting XV for the 1997 Five Nations as it wasn't felt that he was in good enough form to be guaranteed a place in the team. He was not selected for that summer's Lions tour to South Africa losing his place to uncapped Will Greenwood. Under new coach Clive Woodward in autumn 1997, he lost both the captaincy to Lawrence Dallaglio and his starting position to Greenwood, though he remained a valued squad member. He showed some very good form in the 1999 world cup, particularly in the pool game against New Zealand. In total, he won 38 caps for England and started in the centre throughout the 1994/1995 season, including an outstanding performance in the first tour to South Africa after apartheid, where he played in both test matches. He was involved in over 60 England match day squads.

== Post-retirement career ==
Chiding his renowned good-looks, teammates often referred to de Glanville as "Hollywood"; a trait seemingly incongruous with his hard, committed playing style.

In 2003 he competed in the BBC's Superstars television show, winning the kayaking and golf events but eventually coming last in the final. He was a regional member of Sport England and from 2012 to 2015 was the Director of Elite Sport at Hartpury College. He went into executive search with Hanover Fox UK in 2015 and is one of the three current owners of the business having bought it in 2019.

== Personal life ==
De Glanville lives in Bath, UK.

He is the father of rugby player Tom de Glanville.

Sporting positions
Preceded by Will Carling	English National Rugby Union Captain; Nov 1996	Succeeded by Jason Leonard
Preceded by Jason Leonard	English National Rugby Union Captain; Feb–Jul 1997	Succeeded by Lawrence Dallaglio
