= Jannie Claassens =

South African rugby union player (born 1969)

- Born: Johannes Petrus Claassens; 30 June 1969 (age 57) Welkom, Free State
- Height: 1.89 m (6 ft 2 in)
- Weight: 95 kg (209 lb)
- School: Zeerust High School, Zeerust, North West

Rugby union career
Provincial / State sides
Years	Team	Apps	(Points)
1990–1998	Northern Transvaal	102	(58)
International career
Years	Team	Apps	(Points)
1994	South Africa		
National sevens team
Years	Team		Comps
1993, 1996	South Africa 7s		4

Johannes Petrus "Jannie" Claassens (born 30 June 1969) is a South African former rugby union player.

== Playing career ==
As a schoolboy Claassens represented Stellaland at the 1988 Craven Week tournament. He made his provincial debut for Northern Transvaal in 1990 and played 102 matches for the union. During 1992, Claassens was selected for the World XV that tour New Zealand to mark the centenary of the New Zealand Rugby Union.

In 1994 he toured with the Springboks to New Zealand and to Britain and Ireland. Claassens did not play in any test matches but played in eight tour matches, scoring three tries for the Springboks. In 1993 and in 1996, he represented South Africa in sevens.

== Accolades ==
Claassens was voted as one of the five South Africa Young Players of the Year for 1990, along with Andrew Aitken, Bernard Fourie, Ian MacDonald and Theo Jansen van Rensburg.

== See also ==
- List of South Africa national rugby union players – Springbok no. 611
- List of South Africa national rugby sevens players
