= Lance Sherrell =

South African rugby union player

- Born: Lance Reginald Sherrell; 9 February 1966 (age 60) Durban, KwaZulu-Natal
- Height: 1.70 m (5 ft 7 in)
- Weight: 78 kg (172 lb)
- School: St Stithians College
- University: University of Cape Town

Rugby union career
Senior career
Years	Team	Apps	(Points)
1997–98	Benetton Rugby		
Provincial / State sides
Years	Team	Apps	(Points)
1986–87	Transvaal	3	
1990–92, 98	Western Province	49	(275)
1993	Natal		
1994–96	Northern Transvaal	33	(521)
International career
Years	Team	Apps	(Points)
1994	South Africa		

Lance Reginald Sherrell (born 9 February 1966) is a South African former rugby union player.

== Playing career ==
Sherrell represented Transvaal at the 1983 and the 1984 Craven Week tournament and made his senior provincial debut for Transvaal in 1986, after which he also played for Western Province, Natal and Northern Transvaal. In 1994 he toured with the Springboks to New Zealand. Sherrell did not play in any test matches but played in six tour matches, scoring 31 points, including three tries, for the Springboks.

== See also ==
- List of South Africa national rugby union players – Springbok no. 613
