= Balie Swart =

South African rugby union player

- Born: Izak Stephanus de Villiers Swart; 18 May 1964 (age 62) Malmesbury, Western Cape, South Africa
- Height: 1.85 m (6 ft 1 in)
- Weight: 112 kg (247 lb)
- School: Paarl Gimnasium
- University: Stellenbosch University

Rugby union career
- Position: Prop
Provincial / State sides
Years	Team	Apps	(Points)
1987–1991	Western Province	58	
1992–1999	Transvaal	108	
Super Rugby
Years	Team	Apps	(Points)
1998	Cats	2	
International career
Years	Team	Apps	(Points)
1993–1996	South Africa	16	

Izak Stephanus de Villiers "Balie" Swart (born 18 May 1964) is a South African former rugby union player. He played as a prop, with the ability to play on either the loosehead or the tighthead side. He earned 16 caps for the South Africa national team between 1993 and 1996.

== Playing career ==
Swart is a product of Paarl Gimnasium and represented and captained the Western Province Schools team at the 1983 Craven Week tournament. He also was selected for the South African Schools team in 1983, once again the captain. After school he played for the University of Stellenbosch before making his provincial debut for Western Province in 1987.

During 1992, he joined Transvaal, now the Golden Lions and until 1999, playing over a hundred games for the union. He was part of the 1993 side that won the Super 10, Lion Cup and Currie Cup in one season.

He had 16 caps for South Africa, from 1993 to 1996, never scoring. He was a member of the winning team at the 1995 World Cup finals, where he played in four games, including as tighthead prop in the 15–12 final win against the All Blacks. He also played in the first edition of the Tri Nations competition, in 1996. Swart also played in fifteen tour matches for the Springboks.

== Coaching career ==
After ending his player career, in 1999, he became a coach and started with the Golden Lions. In 2000 he moved to New Zealand, coaching at Nelson Bays and at the Highlanders. On his return to South Africa he was assistant coach at the Sharks and Springbok scrum coach during the 2007 Rugby World Cup. In 2011 he started working for SA Rugby, assisting coaches and referees with scrum laws and later became involved with SANZAR, working with the referees.
