= 2018 Under-20 Provincial Championship =

- Countries: South Africa
- Date: 11 August – 19 October 2018
- Champions: Griffons U20
- Runners-up: Pumas U20
- Matches played: 20
- Tries scored: 204 (average 10.2 per match)
- Top point scorer: Ethan Williams (Griffons U20, 115)
- Top try scorer: Allistair Mumba (Griffons U20, 17)

The 2018 Under-20 Provincial Championship was the 2018 edition of the Under-20 Provincial Championship, an annual national Under-20 rugby union competition held in South Africa, and was contested from 11 August to 19 October 2018.

The competition was won by Griffons U20, who beat Pumas U20 53–6 in the final played on 19 October 2018.

== Competition rules and information ==
There were seven participating teams in the 2018 Under-20 Provincial Championship. They played each other once during the pool stage, either at home or away. Teams receive four points for a win and two points for a draw. Bonus points were awarded to teams that scored four or more tries in a game, as well as to teams that lost a match by seven points or less. Teams were ranked by log points, then points difference (points scored less points conceded).

The top four teams in the pool stage qualified for the semifinals, which were followed by a final.

There were initially eight teams scheduled to play in the competition, but Border U20 withdrew from the championship towards the end of August 2018. A few days later, it was also confirmed that Boland U20 — who already played in two matches — also withdrew from the competition.

== Teams ==
The teams that played in the 2018 Under-20 Provincial Championship are:

Location of teams in the 2018 Under-20 Provincial Championship

2018 Under-20 Provincial Championship teams
| Team name | Stadium |
|---|---|
| Boland U20 | Boland Stadium, Wellington |
| Falcons U20 | Barnard Stadium, Kempton Park |
| Griffons U20 | North West Stadium, Welkom |
| Griquas U20 | Griqua Park, Kimberley |
| Limpopo Blue Bulls U20 | Peter Mokaba Stadium, Polokwane |
| Pumas U20 | Mbombela Stadium, Mbombela |
| SWD U20 | Outeniqua Park, George |

== Pool stage ==
=== Standings ===
2018 Under-20 Provincial Championship log
| Pos | Team | P | W | D | L | PF | PA | PD | TF | TA | TB | LB | Pts |
|---|---|---|---|---|---|---|---|---|---|---|---|---|---|
| 1 | Griffons U20 | 6 | 6 | 0 | 0 | 379 | 113 | +266 | 59 | 14 | 6 | 0 | 30 |
| 2 | Pumas U20 | 5 | 4 | 0 | 1 | 194 | 150 | +44 | 30 | 20 | 4 | 0 | 20 |
| 3 | Limpopo Blue Bulls U20 | 5 | 2 | 0 | 3 | 178 | 148 | +30 | 25 | 22 | 4 | 2 | 14 |
| 4 | Falcons U20 | 5 | 2 | 0 | 3 | 153 | 188 | −35 | 24 | 29 | 4 | 1 | 13 |
| 5 | SWD U20 | 6 | 1 | 0 | 5 | 129 | 256 | −127 | 16 | 41 | 1 | 1 | 6 |
| 6 | Griquas U20 | 5 | 1 | 0 | 4 | 100 | 242 | −142 | 14 | 37 | 2 | 0 | 6 |
| 7 | Boland U20 | 2 | 1 | 0 | 1 | 57 | 93 | −36 | 9 | 14 | 1 | 0 | 5 |
Final standings.

Legend and competition rules
Legend:
| Qualified for the semifinals. | P = Games played, W = Games won, D = Games drawn, L = Games lost, PF = Points for, PA = Points against, PD = Points difference, TF = Tries for, TA = Tries against, TB = Try bonus points, LB = Losing bonus points, Pts = Log points |
| Withdrew from the competition. | P = Games played, W = Games won, D = Games drawn, L = Games lost, PF = Points for, PA = Points against, PD = Points difference, TF = Tries for, TA = Tries against, TB = Try bonus points, LB = Losing bonus points, Pts = Log points |
Competition rules:
Qualification: The top four teams qualified for the semifinals. Points breakdown: * 4 points for a win * 2 points for a draw * 1 bonus point for a loss by seven points or less * 1 bonus point for scoring four or more tries in a match

=== Matches ===
==== Round one ====
| 11 August 2018 | Falcons U20 | 17–22 | Pumas U20 | Barnard Stadium, Kempton Park |
| 13:00 | Try: Webster Swanepoel; Dylan Nysschen; Con: Elrico Job; Caltino Jones; Pen: Dylan Nysschen | Scoreboard | Try: Calvin Clack; Riekert Barnard; Timothy Allies; De-An Ackermann; Con: Riekert Barnard | Referee: Rodney Boneparte |

| 11 August 2018 | Griffons U20 | 69–8 | Boland U20 | North West Stadium, Welkom |
| 15:00 | Try: Kyle Els; Duke Jantjies; Carl Wijburg; Duncan van Vuuren (2); Balo Mteyise (2); Allistair Mumba (3); Jason Wagman; Con: Ethan Williams (4); Mickyle Snyders (2); Jason Wagman | Scoreboard | Try: Edwill Lundi Msenge; Con: Chantin Jonas | Referee: Johre Botha |

Bye/s: Griquas U20, Limpopo Blue Bulls U20, SWD U20

==== Round two ====
| 18 August 2018 | SWD U20 | 21–64 | Griffons U20 | Outeniqua Park, George |
| 13:15 | Try: Darryn Fortuin penalty try Pen: Braam Abrahams (3) | Scoreboard | Try: Ruan Fourie; Carl Wijburg; Ethan Williams (2); Balo Mteyise (2); Granwill Matthys; Allistair Mumba (2); Spinny van Aswegen; Con: Ethan Williams (3); Mickyle Snyders; Duncan van Vuuren; Jason Wagman (2) | Referee: Bulelani Naka |

| 18 August 2018 | Griquas U20 | 31–40 | Falcons U20 | Griqua Park, Kimberley |
| 15:00 | Try: Martian Nel; Lohan Zeelie; Chandre Ludick; Sinovuyo Bali; Ryno Niemand; Con: Chadwin November (3) | Scoreboard | Try: Caltino Jones; Webster Swanepoel (2); Kallie Grung; Adin Damons; Chris Janse van Rensburg; Con: Dylan Nysschen (5) | Referee: Griffin Colby |

Bye/s: Boland U20, Limpopo Blue Bulls U20, Pumas U20

==== Round three ====
| 24 August 2018 | Boland U20 | 49–24 | SWD U20 | Boland Stadium, Wellington |
| 14:30 | Try: Johannes Geldenhuys; Taine Booysen (2); Jodi Koul (2); Chadd Fortuin (2); Coellin Julius; Con: Leoneal Leonardo Pietersen; Chantin Jonas (2); Pen: Leoneal Leonardo Pietersen | Scoreboard | Try: Cullen Cole; Braam Abrahams; Pieter Uys; Con: Darryn Fortuin (2); Braam Abrahams; Pen: Darryn Fortuin | Referee: Sindile Ngcese |

| 24 August 2018 | Griffons U20 | 47–37 | Limpopo Blue Bulls U20 | North West Stadium, Welkom |
| 15:00 | Try: Kyle Els; Ethan Williams; Anton Gravett; Granwill Matthys (3); Allistair Mumba; Con: Ethan Williams (6) | Scoreboard | Try: Jan-Barend Meyer; Xander Kruger; Stephane Ndjaya (2); Armando Lubbe; Con: Xander Kruger; Stefan Coetzee (2); Pen: Xander Kruger (2) | Referee: Jaco Kotze |

Bye/s: Falcons U20, Griquas U20, Pumas U20

==== Round four ====
| 1 September 2018 | Pumas U20 | 20–52 | Griffons U20 | Hoër Tegniese Skool Middelburg, Middelburg |
| 15:00 | Try: Divan Bezuidenhoudt; Kyle Theron; Con: Riekert Barnard; Chrizaan Strauss; Pen: Riekert Barnard; Chrizaan Strauss | Scoreboard | Try: Duke Jantjies (2); Ethan Williams (2); Allistair Mumba (4); Con: Ethan Williams (6) | Referee: Johre Botha |

Bye/s: Falcons U20, Griquas U20, Limpopo Blue Bulls U20, SWD U20

==== Round five ====
| 7 September 2018 | SWD U20 | 16–12 | Limpopo Blue Bulls U20 | Outeniqua Park, George |
| 15:30 | Try: Stiaan Grobler; Ronaldo Jansen; Pen: Darryn Fortuin (2) | Scoreboard | Try: Jason Martins; Esihle Mbilini; Con: Xander Kruger | Referee: Bulelani Naka |

| 8 September 2018 | Griffons U20 | 85–3 | Griquas U20 | North West Stadium, Welkom |
| 15:00 | Try: Carl Wijburg (2); Dian de Beer; Gift Dlamini (3); Mickyle Snyders; Granwill Matthys; Allistair Mumba (4); Johan Schutte; Con: Dian de Beer; Ethan Williams (6); Mickyle Snyders; Allistair Mumba; Jason Roux | Scoreboard | Pen: Chadwin November | Referee: Ricus van der Hoven |

Bye/s: Falcons U20, Pumas U20

==== Round six ====
| 15 September 2018 | Falcons U20 | 24–62 | Griffons U20 | Barnard Stadium, Kempton Park |
| 13:00 | Try: Hilton Gie; Quinton Fincham; Dylan Nysschen; Jonathan Harding; Con: Dylan Nysschen (2) | Scoreboard | Try: Kyle Els; Gift Dlamini; Ethan Williams; Mickyle Snyders; Anton Gravett; Duncan van Vuuren; Granwill Matthys; Allistair Mumba (2); Jason Roux; Con: Ethan Williams (6) | Referee: Mpho Matsaung |

| 15 September 2018 | Pumas U20 | 62–10 | SWD U20 | Hoër Tegniese Skool Middelburg, Middelburg |
| 15:00 | Try: Wium Barnard (2); Patrick Schickerling; Riekert Barnard; Timothy Allies (3); Japie Kleinhans (2); Con: Riekert Barnard (6); Danny Mokhoabane; Pen: Riekert Barnard | Scoreboard | Try: Braam Abrahams; Con: Braam Abrahams; Pen: Darryn Fortuin | Referee: Johre Botha |

Bye/s: Griquas U20, Limpopo Blue Bulls U20

==== Round seven ====
| 21 September 2018 | Limpopo Blue Bulls U20 | 40–47 | Pumas U20 | Loftus Versfeld B, Pretoria |
| 15:00 | Try: Jano Lourens; Jason Martins; Cha-Luchiarno Deiker (2); Max Terre'Blanche; Con: Rethabile Mzamo (3); Pen: Rethabile Mzamo (3) | Scoreboard | Try: Wium Barnard; Carl Pieter du Plessis; Josua Steenberg (2); De-An Ackermann; Japie Kleinhans (2); Con: Chrizaan Strauss; Ashwill Botha (2); Pen: Ashwill Botha (2) | Referee: Rodney Boneparte |

| 21 September 2018 | SWD U20 | 20–21 | Griquas U20 | Outeniqua Park, George |
| 15:00 | Try: Jarrett Jaqwin Tities; Ronaldo Jansen; Braam Abrahams; Con: Braam Abrahams; Pen: Braam Abrahams | Scoreboard | Try: Martian Nel; Tiaan Fourie; Ruan Schultz; Con: Chadwin November (2); Gladwin Nieuwenhuizen | Referee: Phumzile Mbewu |

Bye/s: Falcons U20, Griffons U20

==== Round eight ====
| 28 September 2018 | Falcons U20 | 48–38 | SWD U20 | Barnard Stadium, Kempton Park |
| 11:30 | Try: Jonathan Harding (2); Dylan Nysschen (4); Stephan Kempen; Webster Swanepoel; Con: Quinton Fincham; Dylan Nysschen (3) | Scoreboard | Try: Braam Abrahams; Ronaldo Jansen; Curtley Scheepers (3); Con: Braam Abrahams (4); Curtley Scheepers; Pen: Braam Abrahams | Referee: Mpho Matsaung |

| 28 September 2018 | Griquas U20 | 14–54 | Limpopo Blue Bulls U20 | Griqua Park, Kimberley |
| 14:00 | Try: Lohan Zeelie; Martian Nel; Con: Ruan Schultz (2) | Scoreboard | Try: Jan-Barend Meyer; Xandre Miller; Enrique Grobler; Jason Martins; Xander Kruger (2); Tyrique Ferris; Stephane Ndjaya; Con: Xander Kruger (3); Rethabile Mzamo (4) | Referee: Jaco Kotze |

Bye/s: Griffons U20, Pumas U20

==== Round nine ====
| 5 October 2018 | Pumas U20 | 43–31 | Griquas U20 | Hoërskool Middelburg, Middelburg |
| 15:00 | Try: Calvin Clack; Chrizaan Strauss; Josua Steenberg (2); Curtley Deysel; Japie Kleinhans; Ashwill Botha; Con: Chrizaan Strauss (4) | Scoreboard | Try: Jaco Wilkenson; Chadwin November; Christiaan Swanepoel; Sinovuyo Bali; Con: Chadwin November (4); Pen: Chadwin November | Referee: Bulelani Naka |

| 5 October 2018 | Limpopo Blue Bulls U20 | 35–24 | Falcons U20 | Quins-Bobbies Rugby Club, Pretoria |
| 16:00 | Try: Jan-Barend Meyer; Sasha Jacobs (2); Jason Martins (2); Con: Xander Kruger (5) | Scoreboard | Try: Dylan Nysschen (2); Ruan Wasserman; Caltino Jones; Con: Dylan Nysschen (2) | Referee: Rodney Boneparte |

Bye/s: Griffons U20, SWD U20

== Title play-offs ==
=== Semifinals ===
| 12 October 2018 | Pumas | 23–21 | Limpopo Blue Bulls | Mbombela Stadium, Mbombela |
| 16:30 | Try: Ashwill Botha; Curtley Deysel; Japie Kleinhans; Con: Chrizaan Strauss; Pen: Chrizaan Strauss (2) | Scoreboard | Try: Jano Lourens; Stephane Ndjaya; Con: Xander Kruger; Pen: Xander Kruger (3) | Referee: Johre Botha |

| 13 October 2018 | Griffons | 70–5 | Falcons | North West Stadium, Welkom |
| 15:00 | Try: Carl Wijburg (3); Anton Gravett (5); Granwill Matthys (3); Allistair Mumba; Con: Ethan Williams (5) | Scoreboard | Try: Ruan Wasserman | Referee: Christopher Allison |

=== Final ===
| 19 October 2018 | Griffons | 53–6 | Pumas | Hoër Tegniese Skool Middelburg, Middelburg |
| 15:00 | Try: Duke Jantjies; Ethan Williams; Anton Gravett; Duncan van Vuuren; Balo Mteyise; Granwill Matthys (3); Jason Roux; Con: Ethan Williams (4) | Scoreboard | Pen: Chrizaan Strauss (2) | Referee: Phumzile Mbewu |

== Honours ==
The honour roll for the 2018 Under-20 Provincial Championship was as follows:

2018 Under-20 Provincial Championship
| Champions: | Griffons U20 |
| Top points scorer: | Ethan Williams, Griffons U20 (105) |
| Top try scorer: | Allistair Mumba, Griffons U20 (13) |

== Players ==
The following squads were named for the 2018 Under-20 Provincial Championship:

Boland U20 squad
Dylan Aploon • Jumainuine Arendse • Devron-Leigh Baadjies • Taine Booysen • Larren Clint Buys • Samelio Claassen • Dewald de Wet • Wilko du Preez • Chadd Fortuin • Francois Geldenhuys • Johannes Geldenhuys • Curtly John Jacobs • Jay-Jay Johnson • Chantin Jonas • Coellin Julius • Curt-Lee Klaasen • Jodi Koul • Trevor Laubscher • Calum Will Lawrence • Louis Lotter • Athi Maginya • Edwill Lundi Msenge • William Owies • Jaywin Petersen • Leoneal Leonardo Pietersen • Charl-Hein Saunders • Peter Smit • Roaul Stubbs • Curtly Teswill Swanepoel • Cameron Darryl Visagie • Dewald Vrey • Rinaldo Wagenaar • Gurshwin Nikhole Wehr • Romario Wilschut

Falcons U20 squad
Hermanus Johannes Botha • Erik Calitz • Mitchell Cloete • Adin Damons • Inga Daniel • Quinton Fincham • Hilton Gie • Kallie Grung • Jonathan Harding • Marnus Herbst • Arno Hoffman • Chris Janse van Rensburg • Ethan Jantjies • Elrico Job • Caltino Jones • Quinton Jordaan • Stephan Kempen • Rico Klopper • Ruan Kotze • Dylan Lawless • Nkosinathi Mbatha • Marnes Meyer • Luyanda Mkhize • Ruan Nel • Byron Nysschen • Dylan Nysschen • Monde Petela • Hardus Pretorius • Zuray Sili • PG Slabber • Dyllan Smit • Ewardt Steyn • Martin Steyn • Webster Swanepoel • Marco Ueckermann • BJ van Jaarsveld • Herman van Staden • Franco van Wyk • Ruan Wasserman

Griffons U20 squad
Lee-Irwin Andries • Brandon Botha • Jefferson Busch • Ryan Davids • Dian de Beer • Kevin des Johnson • Gift Dlamini • Jacobus Albertus du Plessis • Kyle Els • Ruan Fourie • Anton Gravett • Duke Jantjies • Hanro Jooste • Sergio Kasper • Desmick Kleinbooi • Juan-Carlo Kleynhans • Granwill Matthys • Keenen McCarthy • Balo Mteyise • Allistair Mumba • Albertus Stephanus Pretorius • Jason Roux • Johan Schutte • Mickyle Snyders • Ulrich Stander • Whaldo Swartz • Spinny van Aswegen • Pieter van der Westhuizen • Duncan van Vuuren • Tiaan Venter • Jason Wagman • Carl Wijburg • Ethan Williams

Griquas U20 squad
Christopher Leonardo Andrews • Ranaldo Appollis • Sinovuyo Bali • Petrus Johannes Bezuidenhout • William Bloem • Edrich Brand • Albert Coetzee • Taliesen Dick • Francois du Plessis • Ronaldo du Plessis • Tiaan Fourie • Hendrik Geyser • Chix Griqua • Warren Hart • Christiaan Frans Janse van Rensburg • Elroy Emile Klaaste • WJ Kruger • Chandre Ludick • Siviwe Magobiyana • Tebogo Masemola • Enrico Mawawane • Lloyd Antonie Mostert • Markus Mostert • Jeffrey Muzaza • Martian Nel • Pieter-Henco Nel • Ryno Niemand • Gladwin Nieuwenhuizen • Chadwin November • Alexander Pienaar • Ramon Sauls • Wilfred Saunderson • Marnus Scheepers • Ruan Schultz • Ronaldo Spence • Christiaan Swanepoel • Broline Swartz • Lu-Nathan Titus • Leon van Jaarsveld • Marco van Straaten • Jaco Wilkenson • Zinzan Willemse • Lohan Zeelie

Limpopo Blue Bulls U20 squad
Beraca Bope • Marcus Botha • Ruben Breedt • Stefan Coetzee • Zandre Croukamp • Cha-Luchiarno Deiker • Marc de Villiers • Damian Esterhuizen • Tyrique Ferris • Calvin Gerber • Damian Glaus • Enrique Grobler • Dwayne Jacobs • Sasha Jacobs • Luke Janse van Vuren • Julian Kemp • Xander Kruger • Dylan Lawless • Jano Lourens • Armando Lubbe • Clayton Martin • Jason Martins • Esihle Mbilini • Dylan Meyer • Jan-Barend Meyer • Xandre Miller • Christopher CJ Murphy • Rethabile Mzamo • Stephane Ndjaya • Nathan Nienaber • Kabasele Justice Nkombua • Muzi Nyakane • Lehlohonolo Nyelele • Ken Otshudi • Liam Putter • Jonathan Rabie • Justin Sadie • Brandon Steyn • Gerhardus Swanepoel • Max Terre'Blanche • Tyron Thomson • Barry Viljoen

Pumas U20 squad
De-An Ackermann • Timothy Allies • Joseph Josephus Anker • Riekert Barnard • Wium Barnard • Michael Anthony Benadie • Divan Bezuidenhoudt • Ashwill Botha • Shane Botha • Calvin Clack • Ryan Cloete • Franco Cronjé • Heinrich Cronjé • Tiaan de Beer • Curtley Deysel • Werner Diedericks • Juandre du Piesanie • Carl Pieter du Plessis • Leon Rudolf Etsebeth • Leo Gerritzen • Duhann Gunter • Dumisani Hlungwane • Japie Kleinhans • Branden Kruger • Dawie Lange • Mario Paul Leemans • Deanne Makoni • Dylan Maré • Calvin Meyer • Danny Mokhoabane • Morgan Naudé • Jacob Willem Nel • Wayne Ngubane • Anthony Oberholzer • Jonathan O'Niel • Andre Burger Sandenberg • Patrick Schickerling • Ettienn Slabbert • Josua Steenberg • Chrizaan Strauss • Barend Cornelius Theron • Kyle Theron • Renier Troskie • Kevin van den Berg • Johan van Staden • Steven Venema

SWD U20 squad
Braam Abrahams • Ralston Adams • Vinchenzo Adams • Dilan Boshoff • Zwayne Cameron • Doriano Cliffton Claassen • Cullen Cole • Christopher Stephanus Conradie • Nathan Church • Morgan Douglas • Herman du Plessis • Adriaan-Lee du Preez • Pieter Ferreira • Darryn Fortuin • Tristan Fourie • Josh Foxon • Jean Fry • Stiaan Grobler • Francois Henning • Bradley Enrico Heynes • Ronaldo Jansen • Austin Johnson • Bentley Jones • Burton Kam • Winrich Kennedy • Malusi Khumalo • Bradley Kiewitz • Robin Ronaldo Laminie • Justin Levendal • Dominic Lombard • Anri Maree • Johann Maree • Allistar Markgraaff • Bradley Marthinus • Siyabulele Maxeke • Llyle Metembo • Lithemba Mpoli • Justin November • Jason Phooko • Jaylen Pretorius • Kurt Prinsloo • Marco Raubenheimer • Aylan Schabort • Curtley Scheepers • Willtanio Seconds • Austin Sefoor • Johannes Stander • Jean-Pierre Stopforth • Jarrett Jaqwin Tities • Pieter Uys • Carlen van Coller • Dewald van Rooyen • Tiaan Visser • Radian Williams

== Referees ==
The following referees officiated matches in the 2018 Under-20 Provincial Championship:

2018 Under-20 Provincial Championship referees
Christopher Allison • Rodney Boneparte • Johre Botha • Griffin Colby • Jaco Kotze • Mpho Matsaung • Phumzile Mbewu • Bulelani Naka • Sindile Ngcese • Ricus van der Hoven

== See also ==
- 2018 Currie Cup Premier Division
- 2018 Currie Cup First Division
