= Craven Week =

South African boys' rugby tournament

- Sport: Rugby union
- Instituted: 1964; 62 years ago
- Chair: Rian Oberholzer
- Number of teams: 16
- Country: South Africa
- Holders: Western Province (2026)
- Most titles: Western Province (21 titles)
- Website: SA Rugby

The Craven Week is an annual rugby union tournament organised for schoolboys in the Republic of South Africa. The tournament started in July 1964, and is named after the legendary Springbok rugby union player and coach Danie Craven. The Western Province U18 side are the current holders of the Craven week after claiming the unofficial final in 2026 defeating Western Province XV 40-24. Western Province U18 also currently hold the most final wins (21).

== History ==
The tournament has its humble beginnings in an idea by Piet Malan, then Springbok flanker, in 1949, around the time of the South African Rugby Board's 75th anniversary. He wanted schools to feature in the celebrations and approached Danie Craven in Potgietersrus on how this could be done.

The previous Coca-Cola Craven Week Logo

Dr Craven took the idea to his board who decided on getting the 15 schools unions together for a week. The man who kept the idea alive however was one Jan Preuyt, a former student at the Stellenbosch University and teacher at Port Rex Technical High School in East London. Preuyt had played rugby for Griqualand West and was also the chairman of Border Schools.

At the time there was no such thing as a South African Schools organisation, and the South African Rugby Board were not involved, so Preuyt and Schalk van der Merwe, Principal of George Randall High school, took the initiative to organise the first Craven Week tournament on their own.

The competition began with 15 teams in 1964, growing to 28 in 1987 and 32 in 2000. The format was changed in 2001, and now allows for just 20 teams. Each of South Africa's fourteen provincial unions field at least one team, with some unions sending two squads (one from their urban base and another representing "country districts"), plus representation from Namibia and Zimbabwe in most years.

Each year since 1974 a South African schools team has been selected, and the competition has been open to players of all races since 1980 when Craven himself requested that it be done. The competition has since become a hunting ground for talent scouts trying to find the best new players for their provinces and many young upcoming stars see the tournament as an opportunity to further their careers. The format has been replicated at other age and skill levels, including a U18 Academy Week for provincial B sides, the Grant Khomo Week for U16 teams, and Iqhawe Week for U15 sides which places special emphasis on players from underprivileged or underserved areas.

== Results ==
=== By Year ===
Despite there being no official final for the Craven Week tournaments, there is a main match every year that features the two best teams at the tournament. The results of these main matches since 1971 are:

Main matches at the Craven Week
| Year | Venue | Winner | Score | Runner-up |
|---|---|---|---|---|
| 1964 | East London | Border | 10 -9 | Natal |
| 1965 | East London | Natal | 22 - 11 | Transvaal |
| 1966 | Pretoria | Natal | 13 | Eastern Province |
| 1967 | Cape Town | Vrystaat | 8 - 3 | Western Province |
| 1971 | Kimberley | Western Province | 11–0 | Griqualand West |
| 1972 | Potchefstroom | Western Province | 16–9 | Western Transvaal |
| 1973 | Stellenbosch | Western Province | 36–7 | Transvaal |
| 1974 | Johannesburg | Western Province | 22–12 | South Western Districts |
| 1975* | Pretoria | Northern Transvaal | 20–8 | Transvaal |
| 1975* | Port Elizabeth | Eastern Province | 46–13 | Natal |
| 1976* | Wolmaranstad | Transvaal | 28–10 | Northern Transvaal |
| 1976* | Kroonstad | Boland | 13–9 | Free State |
| 1977 | Oudtshoorn | Eastern Province | 19–17 | Western Province |
| 1978 | Middelburg | Western Province | 12–3 | Free State |
| 1979 | East London | Northern Free State | 9–6 | Free State |
| 1980 | Stellenbosch | Free State | 16–6 | Transvaal |
| 1981 | Worcester | Transvaal | 11–7 | Western Province |
| 1982 | Windhoek | South Eastern Transvaal | 25–7 | Northern Free State |
| 1983 | Upington | Free State | 13–9 | South Eastern Transvaal |
| 1984 | Bloemfontein | Transvaal | 3–0 | Eastern Province |
| 1985 | Witbank | Free State | 23–15 | Transvaal |
| 1986 | Graaff-Reinet | South Eastern Transvaal | 19–12 | Western Province |
| 1987 | Paarl | Natal / Transvaal | 22–22 | N/A |
| 1988 | Port Elizabeth | Western Province | 16–3 | Free State |
| 1989 | Johannesburg | Transvaal | 17–6 | Eastern Province |
| 1990 | Durban | Natal | 18–8 | Northern Transvaal |
| 1991 | East London | Northern Transvaal | 10–9 | Border |
| 1992 | Pretoria | Western Province | 22–15 | Free State |
| 1993 | Secunda | Northern Transvaal | 25–13 | South Eastern Transvaal |
| 1994 | Newcastle | Border / Eastern Province | 13–13 | N/A |
| 1995 | Bloemfontein | Free State | 15–13 | Boland |
| 1996 | Stellenbosch | Northern Transvaal | 24–12 | Western Province |
| 1997 | Kimberley | Northern Transvaal | 29–27 | Western Province |
| 1998 | Vanderbijlpark | Blue Bulls | 23 - 19 | Falcons |
| 1999 | George | Western Province | 15–11 | Eastern Province |
| 2000 | Port Elizabeth | Pumas | 19–18 | Boland |
| 2001 | Rustenburg | SWD | 26–20 | Blue Bulls |
| 2002 | Pietermaritzburg | Western Province | 31–16 | Free State |
| 2003 | Wellington | Western Province | 22–17 | Free State |
| 2004 | Nelspruit | Free State | 17–16 | Western Province |
| 2005 | Bloemfontein | Golden Lions | 38–15 | Eastern Province |
| 2006 | Johannesburg | Blue Bulls | 35–20 | Golden Lions |
| 2007 | Stellenbosch | Free State | 52–3 | Western Province |
| 2008 | Pretoria | SWD | 31–25 | Free State |
| 2009 | East London | Western Province | 19–17 | Free State |
| 2010 | Welkom | Free State | 42–21 | Western Province |
| 2011 | Kimberley | Free State | 28–17 | Golden Lions |
| 2012 | Port Elizabeth | Blue Bulls | 46–0 | Golden Lions |
| 2013 | Polokwane | Western Province | 45–29 | Golden Lions |
| 2014 | Middelburg | Eastern Province | 25–7 | South Western Districts |
| 2015 | Stellenbosch | Western Province | 95–0 | Eastern Province |
| 2016 | Durban | Western Province | 27–20 | Golden Lions |
| 2017 | Johannesburg | Golden Lions | 45–18 | KwaZulu-Natal |
| 2018 | Paarl | Western Province | 47–8 | KwaZulu-Natal |
| 2019 | Bloemfontein | Western Province | 56–31 | Blue Bulls |
| 2022 | Cape Town | Western Province | 29–21 | Blue Bulls |
| 2023 | George | Western Province | 29–5 | Blue Bulls |
| 2024 | Krugersdorp | Western Province | 37–24 | Free State |
| 2025 | Middelburg | Western Province | 27–21 | South Western Districts |
| 2026 | Gqeberha | Western Province | 40–24 | Western Province XV |

* In 1975 and 1976 there were 2 Craven weeks due to the school holidays of the old Transvaal and the rest of SA not corresponding.

=== By Province ===
List of total final results, and respective runners-up, years won and years runners-up
| Provincial team | Wins | Runners-up | Draws | Total finals | Years won | Years runners-up | Years drawn | Historical notes |
|---|---|---|---|---|---|---|---|---|
| Western Province | 21 | 9 | - | 30 | 1971-1974, 1978, 1988, 1992, 1999, 2002-2003, 2009, 2013, 2015-2016, 2018-2019, 2022-2026 | 1977, 1981, 1986, 1996-1997, 2004, 2007, 2010 | - | - |
| Bulls | 12* | 11* | 1* | 24* | 1976*, 1981*, 1984*, 1989*, 1998, 2006, 2012 | 1965*, 1973*, 1975*, 1980*, 1985*, 2001, 2019, 2022-2023 | 1987* | *Records include Transvaal era up to 1996 |
| Cheetahs | 9 | 10 | - | 19 | 1967, 1980, 1983, 1985, 1995, 2004, 2007, 2010-2011 | 1976, 1978-1979, 1988, 1992, 2002-2003, 2008-2009, 2024 | - | - |
| Lions | 6* | 10* | 1* | 17* | 1976*, 1981*, 1984*, 1989*, 2005, 2017 | 1965*, 1973*, 1975*, 1980*, 1985*, 2006, 2011-2013, 2016 | 1987* | *Records include Transvaal era up to 1996 |
| Pumas | 7* | 7* | 1* | 15* | 1976*, 1981*, 1982, 1984*, 1986, 1989*, 2000 | 1965*, 1973*, 1975*, 1980*, 1983, 1985*, 1993 | 1987* | *Records include Transvaal era up to 1996 |
| Valke | 4* | 6* | 1* | 11* | 1976*, 1981*, 1984*, 1989* | 1965*, 1973*, 1975*, 1980*, 1985* | 1987* | *Records include Transvaal era up to 1996 |
| Leopards | 4* | 6* | 1* | 11* | 1976*, 1981*, 1984*, 1989* | 1965*, 1973*, 1972, 1975*, 1980*, 1985* | 1987* | *Records include Transvaal era up to 1996 |
| Eastern Province Elephants | 3 | 6 | 1 | 10 | 1975, 1977, 2014 | 1966, 1984, 1989, 1999, 2005, 2015 | 1994 | - |
| Sharks | 3 | 4 | 1 | 8 | 1965-1966, 1990 | 1964, 1975, 2017-2018 | 1987 | - |
| SWD Eagles | 2 | 3 | - | 5 | 2001, 2008 | 1974, 2005, 2014 | - | - |
| Boland Cavaliers | 1 | 2 | - | 3 | 1976 | 1995, 2000 | - | - |
| Border Bulldogs | 1 | 1 | 1 | 3 | 1964 | 1991 | 1994 | - |
| Griffons | 1 | 1 | - | 2 | 1979 | 1982 | - | - |
| Griquas | 0 | 1 | - | 1 | - | 1971 | - | - |
| Western Province XV | 0 | 1 | - | 1 | - | 2026 | - | - |

* These statistics combine the achievements of The Transvaal prior to the provinces being split into the Golden Lions, Blue Bulls, Pumas, Valke & the Leopards.

== Provinces ==
The following provincial teams participate in the annual Craven Week festival:

Map of South Africa displaying the borders of the 14 teams in the Craven week tournament (which mirrors the teams in the Currie Cup)

Craven Week Youth Teams
| Province | Craven Week Team |
|---|---|
| Western Province | Western Province U18 |
| Western Province | Western Province XV U18 |
| South Western District | SWD U18 |
| Boland | Boland U18 |
| KwaZulu Natal | Natal Sharks U18 |
| Gauteng | Golden Lions U18 |
| East Gauteng | Falcons U18 |
| Pretoria | Bulls U18 |
| Eastern Cape | Eastern Province U18 |
| Eastern Cape | Border U18 |
| Free State | Cheetahs U18 |
| Northern Free State | Griffons U18 |
| Northern Cape | Griquas U18 |
| Limpopo | Limpopo Bulls U18 |
| Mpumalanga | Pumas U18 |
| North West | Leopards U18 |

Namibia and Zimbabwe were regular participants in the Under-18 Craven Week, competing as invited national sides alongside South Africa's provincial teams, particularly following the tournament's restructuring in 2001. However, both countries were excluded from the main U18 Craven Week from 2018 onward after SA Rugby reduced and refocused the competition, with Namibia and Zimbabwe thereafter featuring at the U18 Academy Week instead.

Other International Craven Week Sides
| Country | Craven Week Team |
|---|---|
| Zimbabwe | Zimbabwe U18 |
| Namibia | Namibia U18 |

== Results ==
=== 2026 ===
2026 Craven Week Log
While the Craven Week tournament does not feature an official points log, the ranking below compiles the cumulative match statistics for all participating provinces during this edition. This statistical summary does not represent an accurate reflection of team strength or a definitive ranking, as the scheduling format means certain provinces face significantly higher-ranked opponents than others. However, the table accurately reflects the tournament's final performance outcomes at both extremes, clearly identifying the top two performing sides who contested the main final match.

2026 Craven Week Log
| Pos | Team | P | W | D | L | PF | PA | PD | W% |
|---|---|---|---|---|---|---|---|---|---|
| 1 | Western Province | 3 | 3 | 0 | 0 | 135 | 90 | +45 | 100% |
| 2 | Western Province XV | 3 | 2 | 0 | 1 | 90 | 87 | +3 | 67% |
| 3 | Boland U18 | 3 | 2 | 1 | 0 | 111 | 69 | +42 | 67% |
| 4 | Leopards U18 | 3 | 2 | 0 | 1 | 122 | 84 | +38 | 67% |
| 5 | Free State U18 | 3 | 2 | 0 | 1 | 133 | 97 | +36 | 67% |
| 6 | Bulls U18 | 3 | 2 | 0 | 1 | 119 | 91 | +28 | 67% |
| 7 | Sharks U18 | 3 | 2 | 0 | 1 | 89 | 73 | +16 | 67% |
| 8 | Griquas U18 | 3 | 2 | 0 | 1 | 98 | 112 | -14 | 67% |
| 9 | Pumas U18 | 3 | 1 | 0 | 2 | 100 | 97 | +3 | 33% |
| 10 | Lions U18 | 3 | 1 | 0 | 2 | 106 | 106 | - | 33% |
| 11 | SWD Eagles U18 | 3 | 1 | 0 | 2 | 86 | 93 | -7 | 33% |
| 12 | Griffons U18 | 3 | 1 | 0 | 2 | 88 | 100 | -12 | 33% |
| 13 | Border U18 | 3 | 1 | 0 | 2 | 81 | 113 | -32 | 33% |
| 14 | Limpopo Bulls U18 | 3 | 1 | 0 | 2 | 82 | 147 | -65 | 33% |
| 15 | Eastern Province U18 | 3 | 0 | 1 | 2 | 76 | 115 | -39 | 0% |
| 16 | Valke U18 | 3 | 0 | 0 | 3 | 50 | 92 | -42 | 0% |

The fixtures for the 2026 U18 Craven Week Festival are:

Day 1

6 July 2026

| Boland U18 | 39-20 | Leopards U18 |
| | Fixture |

Grey High School, Gqeberha, South Africa

6 July 2026

| Free State U18 | 66-41 | Limpopo Bulls U18 |
| | Fixture |

Grey High School, Gqeberha, South Africa

6 July 2026

| Sharks U18 | 36-17 | SWD U18 |
| | Fixture |

Grey High School, Gqeberha, South Africa

6 July 2026

| Western Province U18 | 42-25 | Eastern Province U18 |
| | Fixture |

Grey High School, Gqeberha, South Africa

Day 2

7 July 2026

| Border U18 | 36-14 | Valke U18 |
| | Fixture |

Grey High School, Gqeberha, South Africa

7 July 2026

| Griquas U18 | 43-29 | Pumas U18 |
| | Fixture |

Grey High School, Gqeberha, South Africa

7 July 2026

| Western Province U18 B | 52-33 | Griffons U18 |
| | Fixture |

Grey High School, Gqeberha, South Africa

7 July 2026

| Blue Bulls U18 | 32-43 | Lions U18 |
| | Fixture |

Grey High School, Gqeberha, South Africa

Day 3

8 July 2026

| Limpopo Bulls U18 | 14-57 | Leopards U18 |
| | Fixture |

Grey High School, Gqeberha, South Africa

8 July 2026

| Eastern Province U18 | 32-31 | Boland U18 |
| | Fixture |

Grey High School, Gqeberha, South Africa

8 July 2026

| Free State U18 | 38-26 | SWD U18 |
| | Fixture |

Grey High School, Gqeberha, South Africa

8 July 2026

| Western Province U18 | 24-22 | Sharks U18 |
| | Fixture |

Grey High School, Gqeberha, South Africa

Day 4

9 July 2026

| Griffons U18 | 29-12 | Valke U18 |
| | Fixture |

Grey High School, Gqeberha, South Africa

9 July 2026

| Border U18 | 14-54 | Pumas U18 |
| | Fixture |

Grey High School, Gqeberha, South Africa

9 July 2026

| Blue Bulls U18 | 57-19 | Griquas U18 |
| | Fixture |

Grey High School, Gqeberha, South Africa

9 July 2026

| Lions U18 | 33-43 | Western Province XV U18 |
| | Fixture |

Grey High School, Gqeberha, South Africa

Day 5

11 July 2026

| Limpopo Bulls U18 | 27-24 | Valke U18 |
| | Fixture |

Grey High School, Gqeberha, South Africa

11 July 2026

| Griquas U18 | 36-26 | Griffons U18 |
| | Fixture |

Grey High School, Gqeberha, South Africa

11 July 2026

| Eastern Province U18 | 19-41 | SWD Eagles U18 |
| | Fixture |

Grey High School, Gqeberha, South Africa

11 July 2026

| Boland U18 | 40-17 | Pumas U18 |
| | Fixture |

Grey High School, Gqeberha, South Africa

11 July 2026

| Free State U18 | 29-30 | Blue Bulls U18 |
| | Fixture |

Grey High School, Gqeberha, South Africa

11 July 2026

| Sharks U18 | 31-30 | Lions U18 |
| | Fixture |

Grey High School, Gqeberha, South Africa

Unofficial 2026 Craven Week Final

11 July 2026

| Western Province U18 | 40-24 | Western Province XV U18 |
| Try: Basson 14' c, 27' c Farmer 34' c Blanckenberg 46' c van Biljon 49' c, 54' c Con: Behardien (5/6) 14', 28', 47', 50', 55' | Fixture | Try: Stander 18' m Saunders 37'; Dido 51' m Hattingh 60' c Con: Pfeiffer (2/4) 38', 61' |

Grey High School, Gqeberha, South Africa
Referee: Thabiso Mbatha (South Africa)

=== 2025 ===
2025 Craven Week Log
While the Craven Week tournament does not feature an official points log, the ranking below compiles the cumulative match statistics for all participating provinces during this edition. This statistical summary does not represent an accurate reflection of team strength or a definitive ranking, as the scheduling format means certain provinces face significantly higher-ranked opponents than others. However, the table accurately reflects the tournament's final performance outcomes at both extremes, clearly identifying the top two performing sides who contested the main final match.

2025 Craven Week Log
| Pos | Team | P | W | D | L | PF | PA | PD | W% |
|---|---|---|---|---|---|---|---|---|---|
| 1 | Western Province | 3 | 3 | 0 | 0 | 152 | 52 | +100 | 100% |
| 2 | SWD Eagles | 3 | 2 | 0 | 1 | 110 | 83 | +27 | 67% |
| 3 | Western Province XV | 3 | 2 | 0 | 1 | 123 | 47 | +76 | 67% |
| 4 | Cheetahs | 3 | 2 | 0 | 1 | 120 | 80 | +40 | 67% |
| 5 | Griquas | 3 | 2 | 0 | 1 | 89 | 89 | - | 67% |
| 6 | Golden Lions | 3 | 2 | 0 | 1 | 85 | 115 | −30 | 67% |
| 7 | Limpopo Blue Bulls | 3 | 2 | 0 | 1 | 78 | 110 | −32 | 67% |
| 8 | Pumas | 3 | 1 | 0 | 2 | 69 | 27 | +42 | 33% |
| 9 | Leopards | 3 | 1 | 1 | 1 | 117 | 82 | +35 | 33% |
| 10 | Blue Bulls | 3 | 1 | 0 | 2 | 144 | 112 | +32 | 33% |
| 11 | Valke | 3 | 1 | 1 | 1 | 83 | 74 | +9 | 33% |
| 12 | Sharks | 3 | 1 | 0 | 2 | 66 | 89 | −23 | 33% |
| 13 | Border | 3 | 1 | 0 | 2 | 60 | 95 | −35 | 33% |
| 14 | Eastern Province | 3 | 1 | 0 | 2 | 64 | 129 | −65 | 33% |
| 15 | Boland | 3 | 1 | 0 | 2 | 75 | 151 | −76 | 33% |
| 16 | Griffons | 3 | 0 | 0 | 3 | 86 | 139 | −53 | 0% |

The results from the 2025 U18 Craven Week Festival were:

Day 1

7 July 2025

| Western Province XV | 52–06 | Griffons |
| | Report |

Hoërskool Middelburg, Mpumalanga, South Africa

7 July 2025

| SWD Eagles | 35–34 | Cheetahs |
| | Report |

Hoërskool Middelburg, Mpumalanga, South Africa

7 July 2025

| Golden Lions | 36–35 | Blue Bulls |
| | Report |

Hoërskool Middelburg, Mpumalanga, South Africa

7 July 2025

| Pumas | 12–22 | Limpopo Bulls |
| | Report |

Hoërskool Middelburg, Mpumalanga, South Africa

Day 2

8 July 2025

| Leopards | 29–29 | Valke |
| | Report |

Hoërskool Middelburg, Mpumalanga, South Africa

8 July 2025

| Border | 36–17 | Griquas |
| | Report |

Hoërskool Middelburg, Mpumalanga, South Africa

8 July 2025

| Sharks | 41–10 | Eastern Province |
| | Report |

Hoërskool Middelburg, Mpumalanga, South Africa

8 July 2025

| Western Province | 80–18 | Boland |
| | Report |

Hoërskool Middelburg, Mpumalanga, South Africa

Day 3

9 July 2025

| Limpopo Bulls | 49–44 | Griffons |
| | Report |

Hoërskool Middelburg, Mpumalanga, South Africa

9 July 2025

| Western Province XV | 45–14 | Pumas |
| | Report |

Hoërskool Middelburg, Mpumalanga, South Africa

9 July 2025

| Cheetahs | 52–33 | Blue Bulls |
| | Report |

Hoërskool Middelburg, Mpumalanga, South Africa

9 July 2025

| Golden Lions | 22–54 | SWD Eagles |
| | Report |

Hoërskool Middelburg, Mpumalanga, South Africa

Day 4

10 July 2025

| Boland | 19–35 | Valke |
| | Report |

Hoërskool Middelburg, Mpumalanga, South Africa

10 July 2025

| Griquas | 46–34 | Leopards |
| Try: Harding 29' m Rautenbach 33' c, 68' m Kella 36' c Gadeija 46' c, 61' c de Klerk 55' m Con: Gadeija (4/7) 34', 37', 47', 62'; Pen: Gadeija (1/1) 58' | Report | Try: van Ryhn 1' c Motsusi 4' c Sekoto 14' m Schalkwyk 17' m Dumond 37'; Con: Dreyer (3/5) 2', 5', 38'; Pen: Dreyer (1/1) 61' |

Hoërskool Middelburg, Mpumalanga, South Africa

10 July 2025

| Border | 12–30 | Eastern Province |
| Try: Banga 12' m Hansen 39' c Con: Nuku (1/2) 40' | Report | Try: Witbooi 19' m Katikati 26'; Bester 28' c Nelson 31' c Con: Kemp (3/4) 27', 29', 32'; Pen: Kemp (2/2) 6', 17' |

Hoërskool Middelburg, Mpumalanga, South Africa

10 July 2025

| Western Province | 45-13 | Sharks |
| Try: Brits 4' c Muller 17' c van der Merwe 27' c Jooste 41' c Ocks 46'; Neill 68' c Con: van Biljon (6/6) 5', 18', 27', 42', 47', 69'; Pen: van Biljon (1/1) 36' | Report | Try: Afrikaner 10' c Con: Nela (1/1) 11'; Pen: Nela (2/2) 2', 20' |

Hoërskool Middelburg, Mpumalanga, South Africa

Day 5

12 July 2025

| Boland | 38-36 | Griffons |
| | Report |

Hoërskool Middelburg, Mpumalanga, South Africa

12 July 2025

| Limpopo Bulls | 07-54 | Leopards |
| | Report |

Hoërskool Middelburg, Mpumalanga, South Africa

12 July 2025

| Griquas | 26-19 | Valke |
| | Report |

Hoërskool Middelburg, Mpumalanga, South Africa

12 July 2025

| Border | 12-48 | Pumas |
| | Report |

Hoërskool Middelburg, Mpumalanga, South Africa

12 July 2025

| Eastern Province | 24-76 | Blue Bulls |
| | Report |

Hoërskool Middelburg, Mpumalanga, South Africa

12 July 2025

| Golden Lions | 27-26 | Western Province XV |
| | Report |

Hoërskool Middelburg, Mpumalanga, South Africa

12 July 2025

| Sharks | 12-34 | Cheetahs |
| | Report |

Hoërskool Middelburg, Mpumalanga, South Africa

Unofficial 2025 Craven Week Final

12 July 2025
11:45 (SAST)

| Western Province | 27-21 | SWD Eagles |
| Try: Ocks 11' m Neill 16' m Potgieter 34' c Davids 43' c Con: Brits (2/4) 35', 44'; Pen: Brits (1/1) 37'; Cards: Rabe (yellow card) 48'; Ocks (yellow card) 69' | Report | Try: Pratt 50' m Scheffer 70' c Con: Viljoen (1/2) 71'; Pen: Pockpas (3/3) 2', 10', 20'; Cards: Petersen (yellow card) 55' |

Hoërskool Middelburg, Mpumalanga, South Africa
Referee: Charlwyn Darries (South Africa)

Assistant referees:
Juan de Bod (South Africa), Jack Macneice (South Africa)
Television match official:
Egon Seconds (South Africa)

=== 2024 ===
2024 Craven Week Log
While the Craven Week tournament does not feature an official points log, the ranking below compiles the cumulative match statistics for all participating provinces during this edition. This statistical summary does not represent an accurate reflection of team strength or a definitive ranking, as the scheduling format means certain provinces face significantly higher-ranked opponents than others. However, the table accurately reflects the tournament's final performance outcomes at both extremes, clearly identifying the top two performing sides who contested the main final match.

2024 Craven Week Log
| Pos | Team | P | W | D | L | PF | PA | PD | W% |
|---|---|---|---|---|---|---|---|---|---|
| 1 | Western Province | 3 | 3 | 0 | 0 | 139 | 64 | +75 | 100% |
| 2 | Cheetahs | 3 | 2 | 0 | 1 | 115 | 100 | +15 | 67% |
| 3 | Pumas | 3 | 3 | 0 | 0 | 144 | 65 | +79 | 100% |
| 4 | Boland | 3 | 3 | 0 | 0 | 110 | 68 | +42 | 100% |
| 5 | Valke | 3 | 2 | 0 | 1 | 100 | 91 | +9 | 67% |
| 6 | Sharks | 3 | 2 | 0 | 1 | 80 | 74 | +6 | 67% |
| 7 | Golden Lions | 2 | 1 | 0 | 1 | 71 | 68 | +3 | 50% |
| 8 | SWD Eagles | 2 | 1 | 0 | 1 | 60 | 62 | -2 | 50% |
| 9 | Western Province XV | 3 | 1 | 0 | 2 | 107 | 81 | +26 | 33% |
| 10 | Blue Bulls | 3 | 1 | 0 | 2 | 81 | 94 | -13 | 33% |
| 11 | Border | 3 | 1 | 0 | 2 | 50 | 68 | -18 | 33% |
| 12 | Griquas | 3 | 1 | 0 | 2 | 94 | 119 | −25 | 33% |
| 13 | Leopards | 3 | 1 | 0 | 2 | 90 | 116 | −26 | 33% |
| 14 | Eastern Province | 3 | 1 | 0 | 2 | 65 | 115 | −50 | 33% |
| 15 | Griffons | 3 | 0 | 0 | 3 | 72 | 130 | −58 | 0% |
| 16 | Limpopo Bulls | 3 | 0 | 0 | 3 | 93 | 156 | −63 | 0% |

The results from the 2024 U18 Craven Week Festival were:

Day 1

24 June 2024

| Western Province | 36–26 | Sharks |
| | Report |

Hoërskool Monument, Krugersdorp, South Africa

24 June 2024

| Eastern Province | 24–14 | Border |
| | Report |

Hoërskool Monument, Krugersdorp, South Africa

24 June 2024

| Boland | 41–21 | Leopards |
| | Report |

Hoërskool Monument, Krugersdorp, South Africa

24 June 2024

| SWD Eagles | 41–34 | Valke |
| | Report |

Hoërskool Monument, Krugersdorp, South Africa

Day 2

25 June 2024

| Blue Bulls | 35–34 | Golden Lions |
| | Report |

Hoërskool Monument, Krugersdorp, South Africa

25 June 2024

| Cheetahs | 57–36 | Griffons |
| | Report |

Hoërskool Monument, Krugersdorp, South Africa

25 June 2024

| Pumas | 60–17 | Limpopo Bulls |
| | Report |

Hoërskool Monument, Krugersdorp, South Africa

25 June 2024

| Western Province XV | 52–17 | Griquas |
| | Report |

Hoërskool Monument, Krugersdorp, South Africa

Day 3

26 June 2024

| Sharks | 28–19 | SWD Eagles |
| | Report |

Hoërskool Monument, Krugersdorp, South Africa

26 June 2024

| Boland | 34–20 | Border |
| | Report |

Hoërskool Monument, Krugersdorp, South Africa

26 June 2024

| Valke | 36–26 | Leopards |
| | Report |

Hoërskool Monument, Krugersdorp, South Africa

26 June 2024

| Western Province | 66–14 | Eastern Province |
| | Report |

Hoërskool Monument, Krugersdorp, South Africa

Day 4

27 June 2024

| Cheetahs | 34–27 | Blue Bulls |
| | Report |

Hoërskool Monument, Krugersdorp, South Africa

27 June 2024

| Golden Lions | 37–33 | Western Province XV |
| | Report |

Hoërskool Monument, Krugersdorp, South Africa

27 June 2024

| Pumas | 57–26 | Griffons |
| | Report |

Hoërskool Monument, Krugersdorp, South Africa

27 June 2024

| Griquas | 53-37 | Limpopo Bulls |
| | Report |

Hoërskool Monument, Krugersdorp, South Africa

Day 5

29 June 2024

| Leaopards | 43-39 | Limpopo Bulls |
| | Report |

Hoërskool Monument, Krugersdorp, South Africa

29 June 2024

| Valke | 30-24 | Griquas |
| | Report |

Hoërskool Monument, Krugersdorp, South Africa

29 June 2024

| Border | 16-10 | Griffons |
| | Report |

Hoërskool Monument, Krugersdorp, South Africa

29 June 2024

| Boland | 35-27 | Eastern Province |
| | Report |

Hoërskool Monument, Krugersdorp, South Africa

29 June 2024

| Pumas | 27-22 | Western Province XV |
| | Report |

Hoërskool Monument, Krugersdorp, South Africa

29 June 2024

| Sharks | 26-19 | Blue Bulls |
| | Report |

Hoërskool Monument, Krugersdorp, South Africa

Unofficial 2024 Craven Week Final

29 June 2024
12:15 (SAST)

| Western Province | 37-24 | Cheetahs |
| Try: Boraine 18' c Badenhorst 24' m Potgieter 47' c de Kock 63' m February 72' c Con: Ahmed (3/5) 19', 48', 73'; Pen: Ahmed (2/2) 4', 13' | Report | Try: Adams 8' c van Wyk 29' c Kenny 68' c Con: Stokenstrom (3/3) 9', 30' 69'; Pen: Stokenstrom (1/1) 5' |

Hoërskool Monument, Krugersdorp, South Africa
Referee: Eon van Zyl (South Africa)

Assistant referees:
Daniel Canhenga (South Africa), Zoe Naude (South Africa)
Television match official:
Colin Brett (South Africa)

=== 2023 ===
2023 Craven Week Log
While the Craven Week tournament does not feature an official points log, the ranking below compiles the cumulative match statistics for all participating provinces during this edition. This statistical summary does not represent an accurate reflection of team strength or a definitive ranking, as the scheduling format means certain provinces face significantly higher-ranked opponents than others. However, the table accurately reflects the tournament's final performance outcomes at both extremes, clearly identifying the top two performing sides who contested the main final match.

2023 Craven Week Log
| Pos | Team | P | W | D | L | PF | PA | PD | W% |
|---|---|---|---|---|---|---|---|---|---|
| 1 | Western Province | 3 | 3 | 0 | 0 | 106 | 41 | +65 | 100% |
| 2 | Blue Bulls | 3 | 2 | 0 | 1 | 89 | 68 | +21 | 67% |
| 3 | Boland | 3 | 3 | 0 | 0 | 99 | 71 | +28 | 100% |
| 4 | Cheetahs | 3 | 2 | 0 | 1 | 117 | 61 | +56 | 67% |
| 5 | Griffons | 3 | 2 | 0 | 1 | 113 | 63 | +50 | 67% |
| 6 | Leopards | 3 | 2 | 0 | 1 | 109 | 83 | +26 | 67% |
| 7 | Boland | 3 | 2 | 0 | 1 | 80 | 83 | -3 | 67% |
| 8 | Border | 3 | 2 | 0 | 1 | 65 | 81 | -16 | 67% |
| 9 | SWD Eagles | 3 | 2 | 0 | 1 | 59 | 87 | -28 | 33% |
| 10 | Valke | 3 | 1 | 0 | 2 | 67 | 60 | -7 | 33% |
| 11 | Golden Lions | 3 | 1 | 0 | 2 | 110 | 113 | -3 | 33% |
| 12 | Sharks | 3 | 1 | 0 | 2 | 80 | 92 | −12 | 33% |
| 13 | Griquas | 3 | 1 | 1 | 1 | 59 | 113 | −54 | 33% |
| 14 | Pumas | 3 | 0 | 0 | 3 | 74 | 114 | −40 | 0% |
| 15 | Limpopo Bulls | 3 | 0 | 1 | 2 | 86 | 132 | −46 | 0% |
| 16 | Western Province XV | 3 | 0 | 0 | 3 | 64 | 115 | −51 | 0% |

The results from the 2023 U18 Craven Week Festival were:

Day 1

3 July 2023

| Western Province | 42-12 | SWD Eagles |
| | Report |

Outeniqua Park, George, South Africa

3 July 2023

| Sharks | 34–24 | Western Province XV |
| | Report |

Outeniqua Park, George, South Africa

3 July 2023

| Eastern Province | 26–23 | Cheetahs |
| | Report |

Outeniqua Park, George, South Africa

3 July 2023

| Boland | 26–19 | Valke |
| | Report |

Outeniqua Park, George, South Africa

Day 2

4 July 2023

| Blue Bulls | 40–05 | Border |
| | Report |

Outeniqua Park, George, South Africa

4 July 2023

| Golden Lions | 55–29 | Pumas |
| | Report |

Outeniqua Park, George, South Africa

4 July 2023

| Griffons | 43–22 | Limpopo Bulls |
| | Report |

Outeniqua Park, George, South Africa

4 July 2023

| Leopards | 43–22 | Griquas |
| | Report |

Outeniqua Park, George, South Africa

Day 3

5 July 2023

| SWD Eagles | 20–19 | Valke |
| | Report |

Outeniqua Park, George, South Africa

5 July 2023

| Cheetahs | 54–14 | Western Province XV |
| | Report |

Outeniqua Park, George, South Africa

5 July 2023

| Eastern Province | 40–26 | Boland |
| | Report |

Outeniqua Park, George, South Africa

5 July 2023

| Western Province | 35–24 | Sharks |
| | Report |

Outeniqua Park, George, South Africa

Day 4

6 July 2023

| Border | 31–21 | Pumas |
| | Report |

Outeniqua Park, George, South Africa

6 July 2023

| Griffons | 50–12 | Leopards |
| | Report |

Outeniqua Park, George, South Africa

6 July 2023

| Blue Bulls | 44–34 | Golden Lions |
| | Report |

Outeniqua Park, George, South Africa

6 July 2023

| Griquas | 38-38 | Limpopo Bulls |
| | Report |

Outeniqua Park, George, South Africa

Day 5

8 July 2023

| SWD Eagles | 27-26 | Western Province XV |
| | Report |

Outeniqua Park, George, South Africa

8 July 2023

| Leopards | 51-26 | Limpopo Bulls |
| | Report |

Outeniqua Park, George, South Africa

8 July 2023

| Cheetahs | 40-21 | Golden Lions |
| | Report |

Outeniqua Park, George, South Africa

8 July 2023

| Boland | 28-24 | Pumas |
| | Report |

Outeniqua Park, George, South Africa

8 July 2023

| Eastern Province | 33-22 | Sharks |
| | Report |

Outeniqua Park, George, South Africa

8 July 2023

| Border | 29-20 | Griffons |
| | Report |

Outeniqua Park, George, South Africa

8 July 2023

| Valke | 29-14 | Griquas |
| | Report |

Outeniqua Park, George, South Africa

Unofficial 2023 Craven Week Final

8 July 2023

| Western Province | 29-05 | Blue Bulls |
| | Report |

Outeniqua Park, George, South Africa

=== 2022 ===
2022 Craven Week Log
While the Craven Week tournament does not feature an official points log, the ranking below compiles the cumulative match statistics for all participating provinces during this edition. This statistical summary does not represent an accurate reflection of team strength or a definitive ranking, as the scheduling format means certain provinces face significantly higher-ranked opponents than others. However, the table accurately reflects the tournament's final performance outcomes at both extremes, clearly identifying the top two performing sides who contested the main final match.

2022 Craven Week Log
| Pos | Team | P | W | D | L | PF | PA | PD | W% |
|---|---|---|---|---|---|---|---|---|---|
| 1 | Western Province | 3 | 3 | 0 | 0 | 92 | 63 | +29 | 100% |
| 2 | Blue Bulls | 3 | 2 | 0 | 1 | 93 | 63 | +30 | 67% |
| 3 | Pumas | 3 | 3 | 0 | 0 | 136 | 44 | +92 | 100% |
| 4 | Western Province XV | 3 | 2 | 0 | 1 | 113 | 77 | +59 | 67% |
| 5 | Eastern Province | 3 | 2 | 0 | 1 | 113 | 68 | +45 | 67% |
| 6 | Sharks | 3 | 2 | 0 | 1 | 77 | 47 | +30 | 67% |
| 7 | Griffons | 3 | 2 | 0 | 1 | 104 | 80 | +24 | 67% |
| 8 | Golden Lions | 3 | 2 | 0 | 1 | 80 | 83 | -3 | 67% |
| 9 | SWD Eagles | 3 | 1 | 0 | 2 | 57 | 73 | -16 | 33% |
| 10 | Border | 3 | 1 | 0 | 2 | 75 | 96 | -21 | 33% |
| 11 | Griquas | 3 | 1 | 0 | 2 | 79 | 103 | -24 | 33% |
| 12 | Valke | 3 | 1 | 0 | 2 | 56 | 109 | −53 | 33% |
| 13 | Boland | 3 | 1 | 0 | 2 | 40 | 104 | −64 | 33% |
| 14 | Limpopo Bulls | 3 | 1 | 0 | 2 | 55 | 124 | −69 | 33% |
| 15 | Cheetahs | 3 | 0 | 0 | 3 | 77 | 99 | −22 | 0% |
| 16 | Leopards | 3 | 0 | 0 | 3 | 46 | 83 | −37 | 0% |

The results from the 2022 U18 Craven Week Festival were:

Day 1

4 July 2022

| Griquas U18 | 39-22 | Eastern Province U18 |
| | Report |

Rondebosch Boys High School, Cape Town, South Africa

4 July 2022

| Sharks U18 | 33-05 | Falcons U18 |
| | Report |

Rondebosch Boys High School, Cape Town, South Africa

4 July 2022

| Western Province XV U18 | 65-07 | Boland U18 |
| | Report |

Rondebosch Boys High School, Cape Town, South Africa

4 July 2022

| Western Province U18 | 38-29 | Border U18 |
| | Report |

Rondebosch Boys High School, Cape Town, South Africa

Day 2

5 July 2022

| Pumas U18 | 41-14 | Limpopo Bulls U18 |
| | Report |

Rondebosch Boys High School, Cape Town, South Africa

5 July 2022

| Griffons U18 | 38-15 | Leopards U18 |
| | Report |

Rondebosch Boys High School, Cape Town, South Africa

5 July 2022

| SWD Eagles U18 | 29-19 | Free State U18 |
| | Report |

Rondebosch Boys High School, Cape Town, South Africa

5 July 2022

| Lions U18 | 19-38 | Bulls U18 |
| | Report |

Rondebosch Boys High School, Cape Town, South Africa

Day 3

6 July 2022

| Eastern Province U18 | 25-12 | Boland U18 |
| | Report |

Rondebosch Boys High School, Cape Town, South Africa

6 July 2022

| Falcons U18 | 34-28 | Griquas U18 |
| | Report |

Rondebosch Boys High School, Cape Town, South Africa

6 July 2022

| Border U18 | 34-31 | Western Province XV U18 |
| | Report |

Rondebosch Boys High School, Cape Town, South Africa

6 July 2022

| Western Province U18 | 29-24 | Sharks U18 |
| | Report |

Rondebosch Boys High School, Cape Town, South Africa

Day 4

7 July 2022

| Limpopo Bulls U18 | 24-17 | Leopards U18 |
| | Report |

Rondebosch Boys High School, Cape Town, South Africa

7 July 2022

| Pumas U18 | 48-18 | Griffons U18 |
| | Report |

Rondebosch Boys High School, Cape Town, South Africa

7 July 2022

| Lions U18 | 30-22 | Free State U18 |
| | Report |

Rondebosch Boys High School, Cape Town, South Africa

7 July 2022

| Bulls U18 | 34-15 | SWD Eagles U18 |
| | Report |

Rondebosch Boys High School, Cape Town, South Africa

Day 5

9 July 2022

| Griffons U18 | 48-17 | Falcons U18 |
| | Report |

Rondebosch Boys High School, Cape Town, South Africa

9 July 2022

| Boland U18 | 21-14 | Leopards U18 |
| | Report |

Rondebosch Boys High School, Cape Town, South Africa

9 July 2022

| Eastern Province U18 | 66-17 | Limpopo Bulls U18 |
| | Report |

Rondebosch Boys High School, Cape Town, South Africa

9 July 2022

| Pumas U18 | 47-12 | Griquas U18 |
| | Report |

Rondebosch Boys High School, Cape Town, South Africa

9 July 2022

| Western Province XV U18 | 40-23 | Border U18 |
| | Report |

Rondebosch Boys High School, Cape Town, South Africa

9 July 2022

| Lions U18 | 31-23 | Border U18 |
| | Report |

Rondebosch Boys High School, Cape Town, South Africa

9 July 2022

| Sharks U18 | 20-13 | SWD Eagles U18 |
| | Report |

Rondebosch Boys High School, Cape Town, South Africa

Unofficial 2022 Craven Week Final

9 July 2022

| Western Province U18 | 29-21 | Bulls U18 |
| | Report |

Rondebosch Boys High School, Cape Town, South Africa

=== 2019 ===
2019 Craven Week Log
While the Craven Week tournament does not feature an official points log, the ranking below compiles the cumulative match statistics for all participating provinces during this edition. This statistical summary does not represent an accurate reflection of team strength or a definitive ranking, as the scheduling format means certain provinces face significantly higher-ranked opponents than others. However, the table accurately reflects the tournament's final performance outcomes at both extremes, clearly identifying the top two performing sides who contested the main final match.

2019 Craven Week Log
| Pos | Team | P | W | D | L | PF | PA | PD | W% |
|---|---|---|---|---|---|---|---|---|---|
| 1 | Western Province U18 | 3 | 3 | 0 | 0 | 157 | 69 | +88 | 100% |
| 2 | Bulls U18 | 3 | 2 | 0 | 1 | 102 | 114 | -12 | 67% |
| 3 | Eastern Province U18 | 3 | 2 | 0 | 1 | 105 | 68 | +37 | 67% |
| 4 | Bulls XV U18 | 3 | 2 | 0 | 1 | 117 | 97 | +20 | 67% |
| 5 | Wester Province XV U18 | 3 | 2 | 0 | 1 | 97 | 80 | +17 | 67% |
| 6 | SWD Eagles U18 | 3 | 2 | 0 | 1 | 112 | 98 | +14 | 67% |
| 7 | Border U18 | 3 | 2 | 0 | 1 | 113 | 77 | +59 | 67% |
| 8 | Griffons U18 | 3 | 2 | 0 | 1 | 91 | 99 | -8 | 67% |
| 9 | Lions U18 | 3 | 1 | 0 | 2 | 99 | 83 | +16 | 33% |
| 10 | Sharks U18 | 3 | 1 | 0 | 2 | 108 | 98 | +10 | 33% |
| 11 | Pumas U18 | 3 | 1 | 0 | 2 | 104 | 100 | +4 | 33% |
| 12 | Limpopo Bulls U18 | 3 | 1 | 0 | 2 | 85 | 102 | −17 | 33% |
| 13 | Valke U18 | 3 | 1 | 0 | 2 | 100 | 123 | −23 | 33% |
| 14 | Leopards U18 | 3 | 1 | 0 | 2 | 86 | 112 | −26 | 33% |
| 15 | Lions XV U18 | 3 | 1 | 0 | 2 | 83 | 109 | −26 | 33% |
| 16 | Griquas U18 | 3 | 1 | 0 | 2 | 78 | 105 | −27 | 33% |
| 17 | Boland U18 | 3 | 1 | 0 | 2 | 86 | 124 | −38 | 33% |
| 18 | Cheetahs U18 | 3 | 1 | 0 | 2 | 86 | 124 | −38 | 33% |

The results from the 2019 U18 Craven Week Festival were:

Day 1

1 July 2019

| Cheetahs U18 | 46-24 | Sharks U18 |
| | Report |

Grey College, Bloemfontein, South Africa

1 July 2019

| Western Province U18 | 50-24 | Boland U18 |
| | Report |

Grey College, Bloemfontein, South Africa

1 July 2019

| SWD Eagles U18 | 43-22 | Pumas U18 |
| | Report |

Grey College, Bloemfontein, South Africa

1 July 2019

| Valke U18 | 43-24 | Leopards U18 |
| | Report |

Grey College, Bloemfontein, South Africa

Day 2

2 July 2019

| Western Province XV U18 | 18-14 | Lions U18 |
| | Report |

Grey College, Bloemfontein, South Africa

2 July 2019

| Bulls U18 | 35-24 | Border U18 |
| | Report |

Grey College, Bloemfontein, South Africa

2 July 2019

| Griffons U18 | 28-24 | Eastern Province U18 |
| | Report |

Grey College, Bloemfontein, South Africa

2 July 2019

| Bulls XV U18 | 32-21 | Lions XV U18 |
| | Report |

Grey College, Bloemfontein, South Africa

2 July 2019

| Griquas U18 | 35-24 | Limpopo Bulls U18 |
| | Report |

Grey College, Bloemfontein, South Africa

Day 3

3 July 2019

| Western Province U18 | 51-14 | Cheetahs U18 |
| | Report |

Grey College, Bloemfontein, South Africa

3 July 2019

| SWD Eagles U18 | 39-31 | Sharks U18 |
| | Report |

Grey College, Bloemfontein, South Africa

3 July 2019

| Boland U18 | 36-31 | Valke U18 |
| | Report |

Grey College, Bloemfontein, South Africa

3 July 2019

| Pumas U18 | 54-19 | Leopards U18 |
| | Report |

Grey College, Bloemfontein, South Africa

Day 4

4 July 2019

| Bulls U18 | 36-34 | Western Province XV U18 |
| | Report |

Grey College, Bloemfontein, South Africa

4 July 2019

| Border U18 | 39-36 | Lions U18 |
| | Report |

Grey College, Bloemfontein, South Africa

4 July 2019

| Griffons U18 | 50-22 | Bulls XV U18 |
| | Report |

Grey College, Bloemfontein, South Africa

4 July 2019

| Limpopo Bulls U18 | 46-24 | Lions XV U18 |
| | Report |

Grey College, Bloemfontein, South Africa

4 July 2019

| Eastern Province U18 | 43-12 | Griquas U18 |
| | Report |

Grey College, Bloemfontein, South Africa

Day 5

6 July 2019

| Western Province XV U18 | 45-30 | SWD Eagles U18 |
| | Report |

Grey College, Bloemfontein, South Africa

6 July 2019

| Border U18 | 43-26 | Boland U18 |
| | Report |

Grey College, Bloemfontein, South Africa

6 July 2019

| Lions U18 | 49-26 | Cheetahs U18 |
| | Report |

Grey College, Bloemfontein, South Africa

6 July 2019

| Sharks U18 | 53-13 | Griffons U18 |
| | Report |

Grey College, Bloemfontein, South Africa

6 July 2019

| Eastern Province U18 | 38-28 | Pumas U18 |
| | Report |

Grey College, Bloemfontein, South Africa

6 July 2019

| Blue Bulls XV U18 | 63-26 | Valke U18 |
| | Report |

Grey College, Bloemfontein, South Africa

6 July 2019

| Leopards U18 | 43-15 | Limpopo Bulls U18 |
| | Report |

Grey College, Bloemfontein, South Africa

6 July 2019

| Lions XV U18 | 38-31 | Griquas U18 |
| | Report |

Grey College, Bloemfontein, South Africa

Unofficial 2019 Craven Week Final

6 July 2019

| Western Province U18 | 56-31 | Bulls U18 |
| Try: Manuel 10' c, 66' c le Roux 21' c van Wyk 30' c Siebert 36' c Evans 51' c, 55' c Rossouw 56' c Con: Wolhuter (8/8) 11', 21', 31', 37', 52', 55', 57', 67' | Report | Try: Langa 0' m Johnson 16' c Strydom 26' c van Rensburg 39' m Con: Basson (2/4) 17', 27' |

Grey College, Bloemfontein, South Africa
Attendance: 5,000+
Referee: Griffin Colby (SA)

=== 2018 ===
2018 Craven Week Log
While the Craven Week tournament does not feature an official points log, the ranking below compiles the cumulative match statistics for all participating provinces during this edition. This statistical summary does not represent an accurate reflection of team strength or a definitive ranking, as the scheduling format means certain provinces face significantly higher-ranked opponents than others. However, the table accurately reflects the tournament's final performance outcomes at both extremes, clearly identifying the top two performing sides who contested the main final match.

2018 Craven Week Log
| Pos | Team | P | W | D | L | PF | PA | PD | W% |
|---|---|---|---|---|---|---|---|---|---|
| 1 | Western Province U18 | 3 | 3 | 0 | 0 | 132 | 23 | +109 | 100% |
| 2 | Sharks U18 | 3 | 2 | 0 | 1 | 83 | 95 | -12 | 67% |
| 3 | Border U18 | 3 | 3 | 0 | 0 | 156 | 39 | +117 | 100% |
| 4 | Lions U18 | 3 | 2 | 0 | 1 | 101 | 51 | +50 | 67% |
| 5 | SWD Eagles U18 | 3 | 2 | 0 | 1 | 114 | 84 | +30 | 67% |
| 6 | Bulls XV U18 | 3 | 2 | 0 | 1 | 101 | 73 | +28 | 67% |
| 7 | Boland U18 | 3 | 2 | 0 | 1 | 92 | 82 | +10 | 67% |
| 8 | Griffons U18 | 3 | 2 | 0 | 1 | 78 | 91 | -13 | 67% |
| 9 | Western Province XV U18 | 3 | 1 | 0 | 2 | 61 | 81 | -20 | 67% |
| 10 | Valke U18 | 3 | 1 | 0 | 2 | 90 | 72 | +18 | 33% |
| 11 | Lions XV U18 | 3 | 1 | 0 | 2 | 98 | 82 | +16 | 33% |
| 12 | Cheetahs U18 | 3 | 1 | 0 | 2 | 75 | 83 | −8 | 33% |
| 13 | Eastern Province U18 | 3 | 1 | 0 | 2 | 76 | 100 | −24 | 33% |
| 14 | Leopards U18 | 3 | 1 | 0 | 2 | 51 | 90 | −39 | 33% |
| 15 | Griquas U18 | 3 | 1 | 0 | 2 | 44 | 93 | −49 | 33% |
| 16 | Pumas U18 | 3 | 1 | 0 | 2 | 69 | 149 | −80 | 33% |
| 17 | Bulls U18 | 3 | 0 | 0 | 3 | 54 | 77 | −23 | 0% |
| 18 | Limpopo Bulls U18 | 3 | 0 | 0 | 3 | 37 | 147 | −110 | 0% |

The results from the 2018 U18 Craven Week Festival were:

Day 1

9 July 2018
10:40 SAST

| Griffons U18 | 51-17 | Bulls XV U18 |
| | Report |

Paarl Boys' High School, Paarl, South Africa

9 July 2018
12:10 SAST

| Border U18 | 68-17 | Limpopo Bulls U18 |
| | Report |

Paarl Boys' High School, Paarl, South Africa

9 July 2018
13:40 SAST

| Lions U18 | 45-26 | Eastern Province U18 |
| | Report |

Paarl Boys' High School, Paarl, South Africa

9 July 2018
15:40 SAST

| Western Province U18 | 72-10 | Pumas U18 |
| | Report |

Paarl Boys' High School, Paarl, South Africa

Day 2

10 July 2018
09:30 SAST

| Lions XV U18 | 57-15 | Western Province XV U18 |
| | Report |

Paarl Boys' High School, Paarl, South Africa

10 July 2018
11:00 SAST

| Valke U18 | 63-24 | Leopards U18 |
| | Report |

Paarl Boys' High School, Paarl, South Africa

10 July 2018
12:30 SAST

| Boland U18 | 61-14 | Griquas U18 |
| | Report |

Paarl Boys' High School, Paarl, South Africa

10 July 2018
14:00 SAST

| Sharks U18 | 46-28 | SWD Eagles U18 |
| | Report |

Paarl Boys' High School, Paarl, South Africa

10 July 2018
15:30 SAST

| Cheetahs U18 | 38-21 | Bulls U18 |
| | Report |

Paarl Boys' High School, Paarl, South Africa

Day 3

11 July 2018

| Bulls XV U18 | 55-05 | Limpopo Bulls U18 |
| | Report |

Paarl Boys' High School, Paarl, South Africa

11 July 2018

| Pumas U18 | 45-29 | Eastern Province U18 |
| | Report |

Paarl Boys' High School, Paarl, South Africa

11 July 2018

| Border U18 | 55-05 | Griffons U18 |
| | Report |

Paarl Boys' High School, Paarl, South Africa

11 July 2018

| Western Province U18 | 13-05 | Lions U18 |
| | Report |

Paarl Boys' High School, Paarl, South Africa

Day 4

12 July 2018

| Leopards U18 | 17-06 | Griquas U18 |
| | Report |

Paarl Boys' High School, Paarl, South Africa

12 July 2018

| SWD Eagles U18 | 38-24 | Lions XV U18 |
| | Report |

Paarl Boys' High School, Paarl, South Africa

12 July 2018

| Western Province XV U18 | 26-08 | Valke U18 |
| | Report |

Paarl Boys' High School, Paarl, South Africa

12 July 2018

| Boland U18 | 19-17 | Bulls U18 |
| | Report |

Paarl Boys' High School, Paarl, South Africa

12 July 2018

| Sharks U18 | 29-20 | Cheetahs U18 |
| | Report |

Paarl Boys' High School, Paarl, South Africa

Day 5

14 July 2018

| Griquas U18 | 24-15 | Limpopo Bulls U18 |
| | Report |

Paarl Boys' High School, Paarl, South Africa

14 July 2018

| SWD Eagles U18 | 48-14 | Pumas U18 |
| | Report |

Paarl Boys' High School, Paarl, South Africa

14 July 2018

| Eastern Province U18 | 21-10 | Leopards U18 |
| | Report |

Paarl Boys' High School, Paarl, South Africa

14 July 2018

| Western Province XV U18 | 20-16 | Bulls U18 |
| | Report |

Paarl Boys' High School, Paarl, South Africa

14 July 2018

| Bulls XV U18 | 29-17 | Lions XV U18 |
| | Report |

Paarl Boys' High School, Paarl, South Africa

14 July 2018

| Border U18 | 33-17 | Cheetahs U18 |
| | Report |

Paarl Boys' High School, Paarl, South Africa

14 July 2018

| Griffons U18 | 22-19 | Valke U18 |
| | Report |

Paarl Boys' High School, Paarl, South Africa

14 July 2018

| Lions U18 | 51-12 | Boland U18 |
| | Report |

Paarl Boys' High School, Paarl, South Africa

Unofficial 2018 Craven Week Final

14 July 2018

| Western Province U18 | 47-08 | Sharks U18 |
| | Report |

Paarl Boys' High School, Paarl, South Africa

=== 2017 ===
2017 Craven Week Log
While the Craven Week tournament does not feature an official points log, the ranking below compiles the cumulative match statistics for all participating provinces during this edition. This statistical summary does not represent an accurate reflection of team strength or a definitive ranking, as the scheduling format means certain provinces face significantly higher-ranked opponents than others. However, the table accurately reflects the tournament's final performance outcomes at both extremes, clearly identifying the top two performing sides who contested the main final match.

2018 Craven Week Log
| Pos | Team | P | W | D | L | PF | PA | PD | W% |
|---|---|---|---|---|---|---|---|---|---|
| 1 | Lions U18 | 3 | 2 | 1 | 0 | 102 | 39 | +63 | 67% |
| 2 | Sharks U18 | 3 | 2 | 0 | 1 | 138 | 104 | +34 | 67% |
| 3 | Free State U18 | 3 | 3 | 0 | 0 | 198 | 100 | +98 | 100% |
| 4 | Griquas U18 | 3 | 2 | 0 | 1 | 159 | 106 | +53 | 67% |
| 5 | Griffons U18 | 3 | 2 | 0 | 1 | 149 | 45 | +104 | 67% |
| 6 | Leopards U18 | 3 | 2 | 0 | 1 | 155 | 76 | +79 | 67% |
| 7 | Eastern Province CD U18 | 3 | 2 | 0 | 1 | 124 | 56 | +68 | 67% |
| 8 | Eastern Province U18 | 3 | 2 | 0 | 1 | 88 | 53 | +35 | 67% |
| 9 | Limpopo Bulls U18 | 3 | 2 | 0 | 1 | 134 | 101 | +33 | 67% |
| 10 | Namibia U18 | 3 | 2 | 0 | 1 | 127 | 114 | +13 | 67% |
| 11 | SWD Eagles U18 | 3 | 2 | 0 | 1 | 102 | 123 | -21 | 67% |
| 12 | Western Province U18 | 3 | 1 | 1 | 1 | 82 | 77 | +5 | 33% |
| 13 | Griquas CD U18 | 3 | 1 | 0 | 2 | 90 | 102 | −12 | 33% |
| 14 | Falcons U18 | 3 | 1 | 0 | 2 | 131 | 153 | −22 | 33% |
| 15 | Bulls U18 | 3 | 1 | 0 | 2 | 78 | 132 | −54 | 33% |
| 16 | Boland U18 | 3 | 1 | 0 | 2 | 70 | 144 | −74 | 33% |
| 17 | Border U18 | 3 | 0 | 0 | 3 | 89 | 148 | −59 | 0% |
| 18 | Pumas U18 | 3 | 0 | 0 | 3 | 87 | 148 | −61 | 0% |
| 19 | Zimbabwe U18 | 3 | 0 | 0 | 3 | 52 | 151 | −99 | 0% |
| 20 | Border CD U18 | 3 | 0 | 0 | 3 | 8 | 191 | −183 | 0% |

* CD represents Country District sides representing in the Eastern Province, Griquas, and Border.

The results from the 2018 U18 Craven Week Festival were:

Day 1

17 July 2017

| Griquas CD U18 | 28-27 | Griffons U18 |
| | Report |

St Stithians, Johannesburg, South Africa

17 July 2017

| Free State U18 | 81-26 | Boland U18 |
| | Report |

St Stithians, Johannesburg, South Africa

17 July 2017

| Lions U18 | 44-08 | Border U18 |
| | Report |

St Stithians, Johannesburg, South Africa

17 July 2017

| Limpopo Bulls U18 | 41-03 | Border CD U18 |
| | Report |

St Stithians, Johannesburg, South Africa

17 July 2017

| Western Province U18 | 36-10 | PumasU18 |
| | Report |

St Stithians, Johannesburg, South Africa

Day 2

18 July 2017

| Griquas U18 | 42-20 | Eastern Province CD U18 |
| | Report |

St Stithians, Johannesburg, South Africa

18 July 2017

| Sharks U18 | 55-33 | Bulls U18 |
| | Report |

St Stithians, Johannesburg, South Africa

18 July 2017

| Leopards U18 | 72-17 | Zimbabwe U18 |
| | Report |

St Stithians, Johannesburg, South Africa

18 July 2017

| Namibia U18 | 52-36 | Falcons U18 |
| | Report |

St Stithians, Johannesburg, South Africa

18 July 2017

| SWD Eagles U18 | 27-22 | Eastern Province U18 |
| | Report |

St Stithians, Johannesburg, South Africa

Day 3

19 July 2017

| Boland U18 | 32-21 | Griquas CD U18 |
| | Report |

St Stithians, Johannesburg, South Africa

19 July 2017

| Free State U18 | 63-41 | Pumas U18 |
| | Report |

St Stithians, Johannesburg, South Africa

19 July 2017

| Lions U18 | 13-13 | Western Province U18 |
| | Report |

St Stithians, Johannesburg, South Africa

19 July 2017

| Griffons U18 | 80-05 | Border CD U18 |
| | Report |

St Stithians, Johannesburg, South Africa

19 July 2017

| Limpopo Bulls U18 | 59-41 | BorderU18 |
| | Report |

St Stithians, Johannesburg, South Africa

Day 4

20 July 2017

| Eastern Province CD U18 | 34-14 | Zimbabwe U18 |
| | Report |

St Stithians, Johannesburg, South Africa

20 July 2017

| Eastern Province U18 | 37-00 | Bulls U18 |
| | Report |

St Stithians, Johannesburg, South Africa

20 July 2017

| Griquas U18 | 60-52 | Falcons U18 |
| | Report |

St Stithians, Johannesburg, South Africa

20 July 2017

| Sharks U18 | 65-26 | SWD Eagles U18 |
| | Report |

St Stithians, Johannesburg, South Africa

20 July 2017

| Leopards U18 | 57-30 | Namibia U18 |
| | Report |

St Stithians, Johannesburg, South Africa

Day5

22 July 2017

| Bulls U18 | 45-40 | Border U18 |
| | Report |

St Stithians, Johannesburg, South Africa

22 July 2017

| Eastern Province CD U18 | 70-00 | Border CD U18 |
| | Report |

St Stithians, Johannesburg, South Africa

22 July 2017

| Eastern Province U18 | 29-26 | Leopards U18 |
| | Report |

St Stithians, Johannesburg, South Africa

22 July 2017

| Free State U18 | 54-33 | Western Province U18 |
| | Report |

St Stithians, Johannesburg, South Africa

22 July 2017

| Griffons U18 | 42-12 | Boland U18 |
| | Report |

St Stithians, Johannesburg, South Africa

22 July 2017

| Griquas U18 | 57-34 | Limpopo Bulls U18 |
| | Report |

St Stithians, Johannesburg, South Africa

22 July 2017

| Namibia U18 | 45-21 | Zimbabwe U18 |
| | Report |

St Stithians, Johannesburg, South Africa

22 July 2017

| SWD Eagles U18 | 49-36 | Pumas U18 |
| | Report |

St Stithians, Johannesburg, South Africa

22 July 2017

| Falcons U18 | 43-41 | Griquas CD U18 |
| | Report |

St Stithians, Johannesburg, South Africa

Unofficial 2017 Craven Week Final

22 July 2017

| Lions U18 | 45-18 | Sharks U18 |
| | Report |

St Stithians, Johannesburg, South Africa

== Squad Selections ==
=== 2026 ===
The following U18 squads were named for the 2026 Craven week:

Western Province Youth Teams 2026
| WP U18 CW | Uzair Blanckenberg (Stellenberg) • Jayden Steyl (Paarl Gim) • Charles Whitehead (Paarl Gim) • Kwaza Gobingca (Rondebosch) • Zak Steyn (Paul Roos) • Solam Gegana (Wynberg) • Jean Dreyer (Paarl Gim) • Juvan Burden (Stellenberg) • Christiaan Le Roux (Paul Roos) • Linakho Mehlomakulu (Rondebosch) • Esa van der Schyff (Wynberg) • Werner de Bruin (Paul Roos) • Hendre van Zyl (Paarl Gim) • Mickyle Booise (Paarl Gim) • Caleb Bell (Rondebosch) • Ethan van Biljon (Stellenberg) • Achmat Behardien (Wynberg) • Elijaron Geduld (Bishops) • Ethan Barker (Paarl Gim) • Tiaan Basson (Paul Roos) • JC Swart (Stellenberg) • Dirk Farmer (Paarl Boys) • Liam Jacobs (Stellenberg) |
| Coach | Heinrich Martin (Milnerton) |
| WP XV U18 CW | JG van der Bergh (Paarl Gim) • Max Malan (Paarl Boys) • Ridah Johnston (Wynberg) • Naeem Mohammed (Wynberg) • Likhona Anda Filtana (Milnerton) • Deen Fortuin (SACS) • Sebastian Cilliers (Paul Roos) • AD Faul (Paarl Boys) • Luhan Hattingh (Paarl Boys) • Yanos Molnar (Stellenberg) • Chris Nel (Paarl Boys) • Henre Valentyn (Paarl Boys) • Rauf Ahmed (Wynberg) • Liam de Villiers (Paarl Boys) • Travis Pheiffer (Paul Roos) • Cadynn Samuels (Paul Roos) • Albert Nel (Paul Roos) • Luca Orgill (SACS) • Farrel-Leigh Dido (Durbanville) • Kyle Snyers (Paul Roos) • Thomas Saunders (Paarl Gim) • Dante Davids (Paarl Boys) |
| Coach | Sean Erasmus (Paarl Boys) |
| WP U18 AW | Boitumelo Mabohlo (Wynberg) • Qiraan Hermans (SACS) • Lehan Barnard (Paul Roos) • JP Norton (Paarl Boys) • Sebastian Bekker (Paarl Gim) • Ruben de Jager (Paarl Boys) • Ruben Winter (Paul Roos) • RJ Cunningham (SACS) • Bernhardt Schultz (Paarl Gim) • Alvin Machinja (Wynberg) • Dirk Hugo (Paarl Gim) • Nico Lourens (Milnerton) • Kerwin November (Rondebosch) • Tristan Armitage (Paul Roos) • Daniel Arendse (Rondebosch) • Louis Koen (Paarl Gim) • Ethan Williams (Rondebosch) • Aleit Stander (Paarl Boys) • Kelebogile Nkwana (Rondebosch) • Louwrens Rademeyer (Durbanville) • Alex Sawyer (Bosmansdam) • Shellvon Mabooi (Rondebosch) • Caleb Clark (Bishops) |

KZN Sharks Youth Teams 2026
| KZN U18 CW | Aphelele Chamane (Michaelhouse) • Theo Boshoff (Maritzburg College) • Nicola Salamousas (Michaelhouse) • Wandile Mlaba (Westville) • Andrew Schnell (Hilton) • Zander Muller (Hilton) • Zion Smith (DHS) • Jamie Wimble (Northwood) • Johannes van der Walt (Northwood) • Daniel Miskey (Kearsney) • Anesu Kuzonyei (Northwood) • Alex Jankowitz (Michaelhouse) • Nathan Aneke (DHS) • Amogeleng Mataboge (DHS) • Luxolo Sonkononkono (Maritzburg College) • Igesias Bruiners (DHS) • Clement Makelele (Kearsney) • Priden Sibiya (DHS) • Tristan Parkinson (Northwood) • Nhlanhla Ndlovu (Kearsney) • Dominic du Toit (Maritzburg College) • Olwethu Kosani (Maritzburg College) • Lwazi Mbebe (Kearsney) |
| Coach | Peter Engeldow (DHS) |
| KZN U18 AW | Aidan du Plooy (Hilton) • Rorke Stirk (Wynberg) • Tunga Griffiths (Kearsney) • Bulelani Cebane (DHS) • Lwango Ntantala (Hilton) • Ken van Volenstee (Northwood) • Aobakwe Moeng (DHS) • Jaydon Jubber (Michaelhouse) • Richaard Kreil (DHS) • Tanwil Onkers (DHS) • Lisa Sijadu (Westville) • Elgenio Oerson (Glenwood) • Sterling Padi (DHS) • Fabiano Fierro (Michaelhouse) • Rosco Williams (Glenwood) • Matthew Wilson (Kearsney) • Awande Mthethwa (Northwood) • Phokuhle Hlatshwayo (DHS) • Sean Jansen (Maritzburg College) • Nala Shabangu (Northwood) • Ben Hughes (Michaelhouse) • Sondelanai Sheleni (Northwood) • Ruan Mulder (Hilton) |
| Coach | Kevin Elder (Maritzburg College) |

Eastern Province Youth Teams 2026
| EP U18 CW | Daniel Naude (Grey High) • Sitenkhosi Qabaka (Kingswood) • Micah Wessels (Grey High) • Jano Janse van Rensburg (Nico Malan) • Juan Potgieter (Grey High) • Silindisiwe Ntsokoma (Grey High) • JG De Lange (Marlow) • Ruben van Dijk (Nico Malan) • Ross Thompson (Kingswood) • Neshaun Bester (Andrew Rabie) • Henrico Bodenstein (Pearson) • Akho Tonjeni (Graeme) • Josh van Zyl (St Andrew's) • Luke Doyle (Graeme) • Nathan Trytsman (Grey High) • Tristan Kemp (Grey High) • Niel September (Spandau) • Anfred Jansen (Grey High) • Erin Nelson (Graeme) • Sibulele Ngebulana (Grey High) • Noah Mbizi (Grey High) • Will Stevens (St Andrew's) • Lucretia Magau (Graeme) |
| Coach | Thabo Sisusa (Kingswood) |
| EP U18 AW | Luyolo Mapalala (Graeme) • Marcus September (Graeme) • Luciano Solani (Marlow) • Dewald Niemand (Pearson) • James Badenhorst (St Andrew's) • Zola Yeye (Grey High) • Logan van Vuuren (Marlow) • Cole Hurter (Marlow) • Ibenathi Kondile (Grey High) • Asakhe Ranuga (Graeme) • Matthew Goliath (Graeme) • Raquel Jaftha (Marlow) • Kaiden Kretzman (Pearson) • Qhawe Madikizela (St Andrew's) • Michael Nyandoro (Grey High) • Uqhena Ogukwekwe (Victoria Park) • Charl du Toit (Kingswood) • Duncan Hudek (Grey High) • David Matiyani (Framesby) • Mdinandi Tyuka (Ithembelihle) • Sinqobile Siyengo (Marlow) • Sumeyer van der Merwe (Marlow) • Lucas Wheeler (Grey High) |

Free State Youth Teams 2026
| FS U18 CW | Hennie Bredenhann (Grey College) • Xander de Beer (Grey College) • JW Coetzee (Grey College) • Alexi Tyropolis (Grey College) • Siva Bulwane (Grey College) • Henru Erasmus (Grey College) • Prestan Bennett (Grey College) • Niel du Randt (Grey College) • Jonathan Drysdale (Grey College) • Samson Lackay (Grey College) • Guiteau Petrus (Fichardtpark) • Ruan Roux (Grey College) • Eddie Mabena (Grey College) • Kingsley Pule (Grey College) • Lamla Mgedezi (Grey College) • Lwazi Mcandi (Fichardtpark) • Desmond Undenzenze (Louis Botha) • Frans-Paul Troskie (Grey College) • Josh Nelson (Fichardtpark) • Andrew Wessels (Grey College) • AJ Hendriks (Grey College) • Zachary Walbrugh (Grey College) • Unathi Ntuli (Fichardtpark) |
| Coach | Pieter Ehlers (Grey College) |
| FS U18 AW | Shaun Ruhle (Grey College) • Wi Dippenaar (Grey College) • Nicus de Jager (Grey College) • Neill Verster (Grey College) • Jannes Krause (Grey College) • Arno de Bruin (Grey College) • Hendre Maritz (Grey College) • Keaton Pottas (Grey College) • Ofentse Tseko (Fichardtpark) • Christoff Crous (Grey College) • Kia Babu (Sentraal) • Madiba Mtanzima (Jim Fouche) • Johan Dormehl (Grey College) • Matthew Valentine (Fichardtpark) • Ayden Cloete (Grey College) • Motlatsi Ramahlape (Louis Botha) • Diado Jacobs (Sentraal) • Chris Nieuwoudt (Grey College) • Dian Visagie (Fichardtpark) • Eugene Jansen (Sentraal) • Reece Sekila (Jim Fouche) • Lino Mtwebana (Grey College) • Ze Mathese (Fichardtpark) |

Boland Youth Teams 2026
| BOL U18 CW | Christoff Fiilmatr (Hugenote) • JP Lotriet (Drostdy) • Reece Matthee (Worcester Gim) • Jean-Louis Matthee (Drostdy) • Nieken Lubbe (Hopefield) • Werno Ramsauer (Drostdy) • Joniel Claasen (Drostdy) • Simamkele Lahlekile (Drostdy) • Wernard de Villiers (Drostdy) • Jayden van Niekerk (Robertson) • Darren Makeza (Drostdy) • Jano van Deventer (Drostdy) • Wilvino Poltan (Drostdy) • Chriswill du Toit (Charlie Hofmeyer) • Anwill Jacobs (Drostdy) • JJ van Staden (Robertson) • Anzo Brinkhuis (Worcester Gim) • Tyrone Modipa (Overberg) • Heinrich Redelinghuys (Porterville) • Jayden Steward (Drostdy) • Diehgo Braaf (Robertson) • Brent-Lee Ekstraal (Drostdy) • Brayden Joseph (Robertson) |
| BOL U18 AW | Ewan Alberts (Drostdy) • Mattias Nel (Drostdy) • Ernst Coetzee (Swartland) • Anayo Egbujor (Drostdy) • Eugene Walker (Drostdy) • Flippie Skors (Montana) • Brendon Smith (Robertson) • Ryk van Zyl (Drostdy) • Nicholai Diedericks (Porterville) • Ruan Nortjie (Drostdy) • Tristan Syster (Drostdy) • Edson Fredericks (Porterville) • Juwaydan van Niekerk (Robertson) • Eldrin de Koker (Montagu) • Sebastiaan Bredel (Stellenbosch) • Gerald Laker (Labori) • Lukin du Plessis (Worcester Gim) • Zinric Josephus (Porterville) • Hanro Liebenberg (Drostdy) • Arthur Kana (Worcester Gim) • Tegan Roberts (Labori) • Jayden Booysen (Lutzville) • Harold de Silva (Bella Vista) |

*AW are players who represent the Academy Week team.
*WP XV are players who represent the Craven Week B side for Western Province.

== Honours ==
The honour roll for each Craven Week year is as follows:

2025 Craven Week
| Champions: | Western Province U18 (20th title) |
| Player of the tournament: | Josh Neill, Western Province, (Rondebosch School) |
| Top Try Scorer: | Thabiso Simelane (6), Blue Bulls, (St Alban's) |
| Top Points Scorer: | Ruben Groenewald (34), Blue Bulls, (Affies) |

2024 Craven Week
| Champions: | Western Province U18 (19th title) |
| Player of the tournament: | Alzeadon Felix, Cheetahs, (Grey College) |
| Top Try Scorer: | Gregan Jansen (5), Griquas, (Duineveld) |
| Top Points Scorer: | Heinz Stockenstrom (45), Cheetahs, (Grey College) |

2023 Craven Week
| Champions: | Western Province U18 (18th title) |

2018 Craven Week
| Champions: | Western Province U18 (15th title) |
| Player of the tournament: | Evan Roos, Western Province, (Paarl Boys) |
| Top Try Scorer: | Stravino Jacobs (5), Western Province, (Paarl Gimnasium) |
| Top Points Scorer: | Stephan van der Bank (39), Golden Lions, (Nelspruit High) |

2017 Craven Week
| Champions: | Golden Lions U18 (1st title) |
| Player of the tournament: | Sanele Nohamba, Sharks, (DHS) |
| Top Try Scorer: | Janco van Heyningen (5), Cheetahs, (Grey College) |
| Top Points Scorer: | Chris Schreuder (39), Cheetahs, (Grey College) |

== See also ==
- SA Schools U18 Team
- SA U19 Rugby Team
- SA U20 Rugby Team
