= Dutch Reformed Church, Middelburg, Mpumalanga =

Church in Middelburg, Mpumalanga, South Africa

Dutch Reformed Church
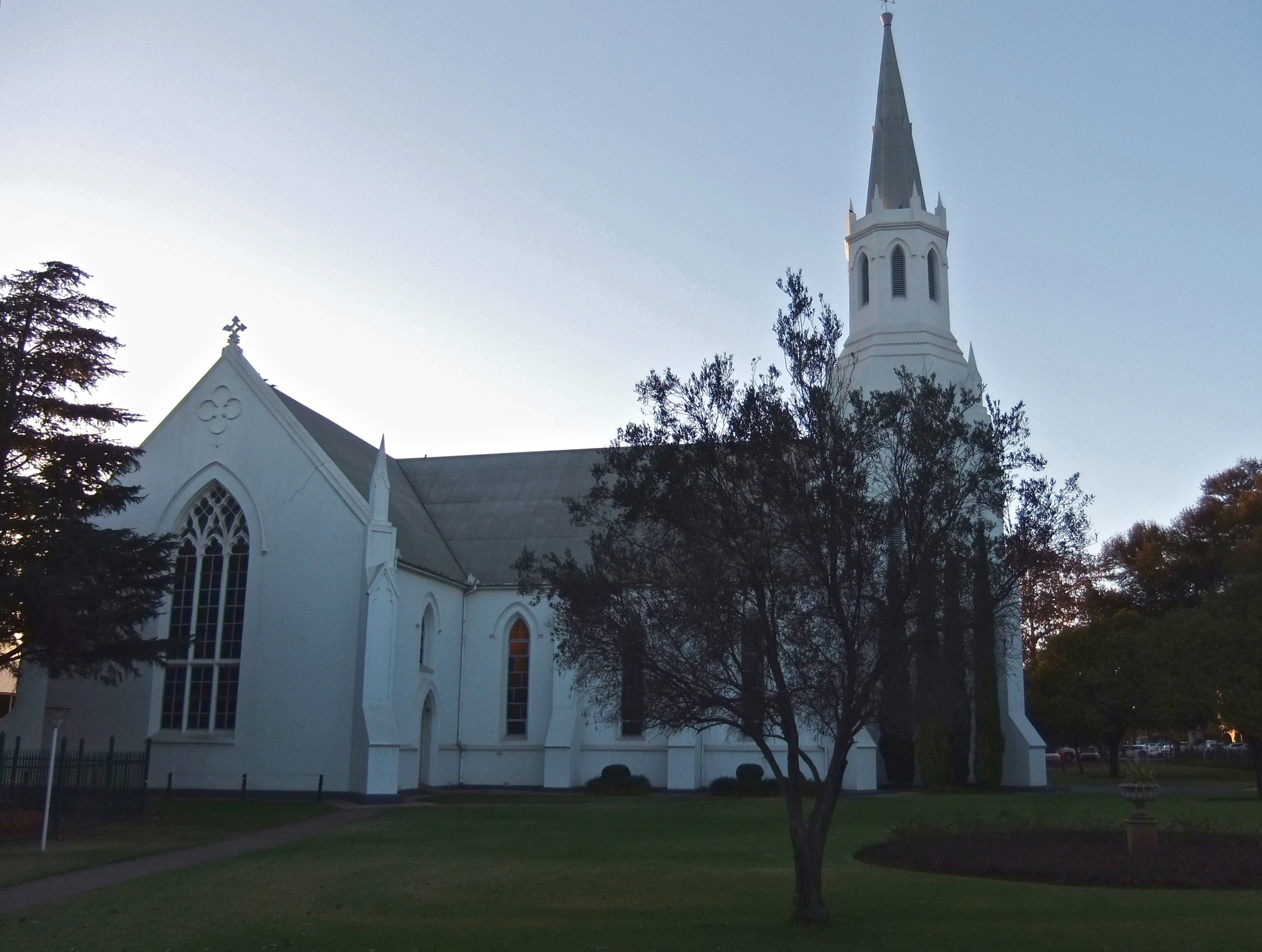
- Location: Middelburg, Mpumalanga
- Country: South Africa
- Denomination: Nederduits Gereformeerde Kerk

History
- Founded: 13 March 1866

Architecture
- Functional status: Church

The Dutch Reformed Church in Middelburg, Mpumalanga, also known as the Witkerk, is a congregation in the Eastern Synod of the Dutch Reformed Church. Before the Transvaal Church divided into two, three and later four Synods, it was the tenth oldest congregation of that church. It was formerly known as the congregation Middelburg, Transvaal, but since around 1994 as Middelburg, Mpumalanga, to distinguish it from the Eastern Cape congregation Middelburg.

== Foundation ==
The congregation was founded on 13 March 1866 under the name "Nazaret". The historical event took place on the farm Elandspruit, which belonged to Elder N.P. Prinsloo, and is located approximately 10 km outside the present town of Middelburg. During the year 1866, the town of Nazareth was surveyed and laid out on a farm that belonged to the Lydenburg congregation. It was not until 24 February 1872 that Nazareth was declared a separate district by the state president and Mr. A.B. Joubert was appointed as the first magistrate. The second building erected (in 1867) was a small Dutch Reformed Church, the cornerstone of which was laid by Rev. Frans Lion Cachet. He was assisted by Rev. Merensky, a missionary at Botshabelo.

== Ministers ==
- Daniel Ferdinand Bosman, 9 September 1874 – 20 December 1880
- Alewyn Petrus Burger, 1884 – 1928
- Georg Hofmeyr, May 1929 – November 1948
- Willem Hendrik Stefanus Barnard, 1946 – 21 October 1973 (when he accepted his emeritus position)
- Willem Jacobus Gerhardus Lubbe, 19 February 1950 – 1952

== Sources ==
- (in Afrikaans) Du Toit, ds. F.G.M. 1967. Ned. Geref. Gemeente Middelburg, Transvaal. Gedenkboek by die Eeufees op 11–19 Maart 1967. Middelburg, Transvaal: NG Kerkraad.
- Olivier, ds. P.L. (samesteller), Ons gemeentelike feesalbum. Kaapstad en Pretoria: N.G. Kerk-uitgewers, 1952.
- (in Afrikaans) Krüger, prof. D.W. en Beyers, C.J. (hoofred.) Suid-Afrikaanse Biografiese Woordeboek Deel III. Kaapstad: Tafelberg-Uitgewers, 1977.
- (in Dutch) Maeder, ds. G.A. en Zinn, Christian. 1917. Ons Kerk Album. Kaapstad: Ons Kerk Album Maatschappij Bpkt.
