= West Church =

West Church may refer to:

- Church of Our Lady of Mount Carmel, Beijing, commonly referred to as 'Xitang' (西堂 -west church)
- Westerkerk a church in Amsterdam
- Westerkerk (Rotterdam) a church in Rotterdam
