= Port Rex Technical High School =

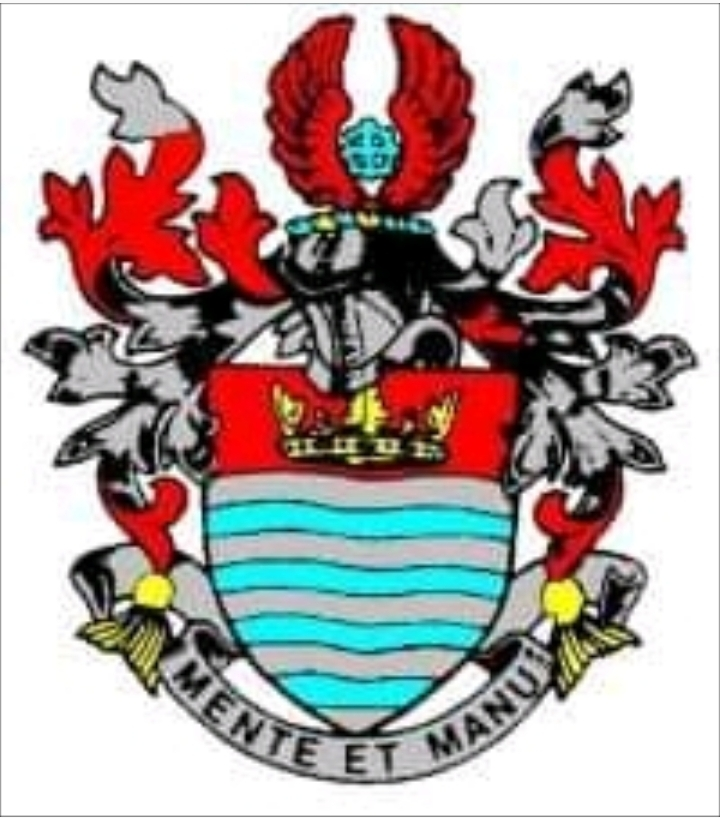

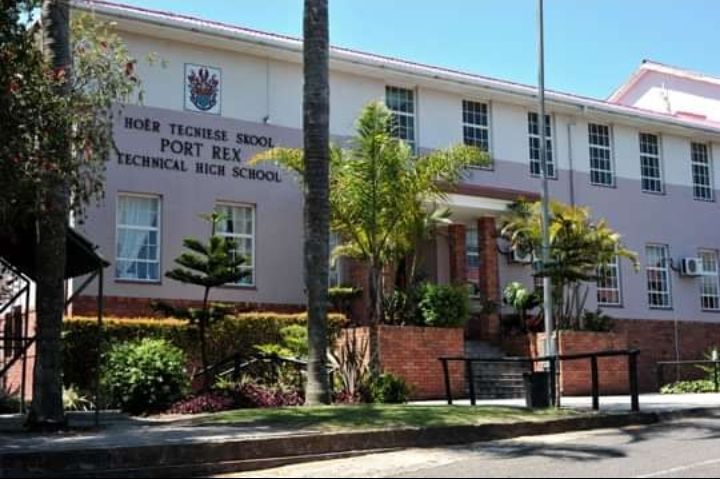
- Port Rex from Chamberlain Road

Location
- 55 Chamberlain Road, Berea; East London, Eastern Cape; South Africa; 32.98530°S 27.91158°E

Information
- Former name: East London Technical High School (1969-1974)
- School type: Public & Boarding
- Motto: Mente et Manu (Mind and hand)
- Established: 1928; 98 years ago
- Headmaster: Mr Ettiene Theron
- Staff: 50 full-time
- Grades: 8–12
- Gender: Co-educational (1989-...)
- Age: 14 to 18
- Enrollment: 700 pupils
- Language: English & Afrikaans
- Schedule: 07:30 - 14:00
- Houses: Christopher; Bissekker; Cowie; Bowie
- Colours: Maroon; Cambridge Blue; White
- Mascot: Lion
- Nickname: Rex
- Rival: Hudson Park High School
- Newspaper: The Port Rex Voice
- School fees: R31,900 (tuition)
- Website: www.portrexths.co.za

Port Rex Technical High School (Afrikaans: Hoër Tegnise Skool Port Rex) is a public boarding co-educational and day school in Berea, East London in the Eastern Cape province of South Africa. It has a rich technical reputation and is one of the very few technical high schools in the province. Prior to 1989 the school was reserved for male students and the boarding facilities are currently still exclusive to male boarders .The tuition per annum is R31 900 and the boarding tuition is currently disclosed and unknown.

== Extra-mural activities ==
Sport :

- Hockey (boys and girls)
- Athletics
- Cross-country
- Water-polo
- Squash
- Tennis
- Golf
- Rugby
- Cricket
- Netball

Cultural :

- Cultural Society
- Debating
- SCA (Student Christian Association)
- Cultural Society
- The Port Rex Voice
- Photography
- Interact Club
- First Aid
- Choir
- Drama
- Gaming Society
- Chess

Representative :

- SRC

Volunteer :

- Library
- Bookroom
- Scoreboards (netball and rugby)
- Tuckshop
- School Shop
- Audio Visual Club

== History ==
Port Rex Technical High School has its roots in the Technical Section of the East London Technical College (1928-1968). In 1969, day scholars of the technical and commercial divisions separated from the Technical College to form East London Technical High School and the East London Commercial High School ( now Stirling High School .In 1974, after a proposition by the then head master, Dr. Johan Brittz, the schools name was changed from East London Technical High School to Port Rex Technical High School. The name "Port Rex" came from the British sailor who landed at the Buffulo River mouth in 1823 . Until 1947 East London was called Port Rex. Dr Brittz also played a significant role in drafting the current school crest. By early 1980s, the premises in Lukin Road had become too cramped to house three separate educational institutions. Urgent attempts were made to look for an alternative location for Port Rex THS. The De La Salle College (1935-1976) in Chamberlain Road became available and was bought from the Irish Catholic Brothers for R 6 million. Dr Brittz was again influential in negotiations with the Public Works Department so that the property was allocated to Port Rex THS. After major extensions amounting to R 3 million, the pupils and teachers moved to the new campus on 9 August 1982 . In recognition of the former dwellers the schools hall was named the De La Salle Hall. In 1988 the school declared its rugby fields officially open. In 1989 the school became co-educational, allowing girls to be part of Port Rex, and 4 year's later the school became a former model-C school in the South African schools terminology.

== Notable staff ==
- Jan Preuyt ( former teacher and rugby coach 1956-1987; founder of Craven Week )
