= Piet Malan =

South African rugby union player (1919–2015)

Pieter Malan (13 February 1919 – 5 July 2015), more commonly known as Piet, played rugby union for the then Transvaal province as well as the Springbok rugby teams. He played the position of flanker.

Malan's sole cap came at the age of 30 on 17 September 1949 against the All Blacks at St George's Park in Port Elizabeth, a game the Springboks went on to win 11–8 to take the series 4–0. It is around this time that Malan made his suggestion to Danie Craven to organise a tournament for schoolboys to coincide with the celebrations of the 75th anniversary of the South African Rugby Board, the implementation of which provided the groundwork for the Craven Week schools tournament.

Malan held the title of the oldest living Springbok between 2005 and 5 July 2015, when he died in his sleep at the age of 96.
