= Westerkerk (Rotterdam) =

Former Protestant church in Rotterdam, Netherlands

Coordinates: 51.9223°N 4.4752°E

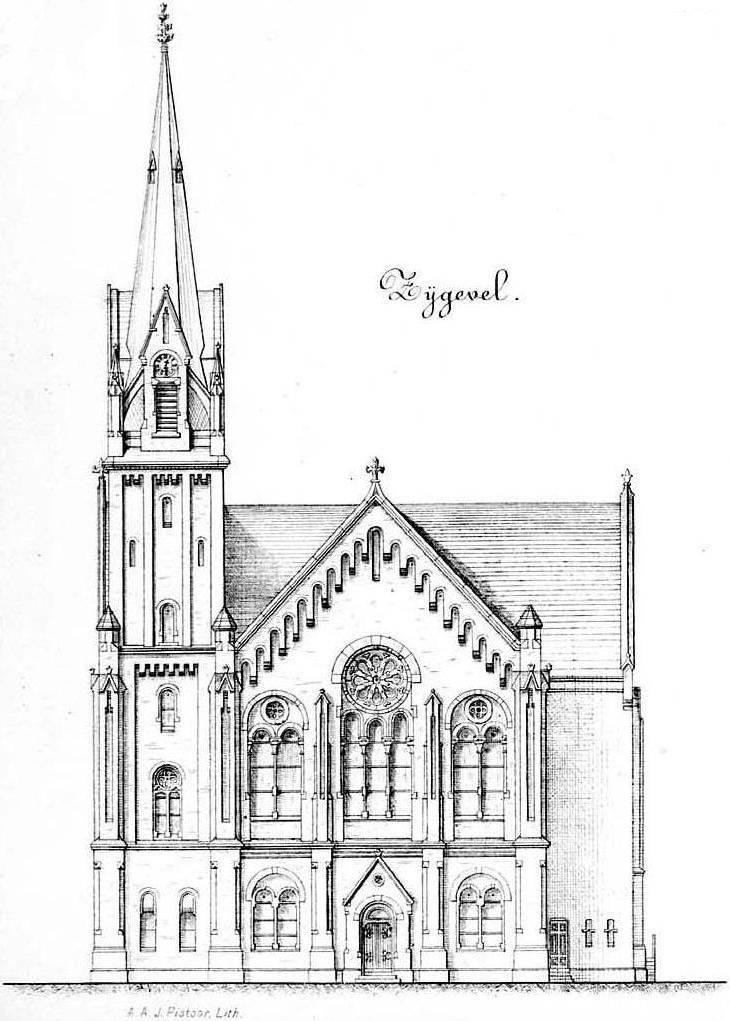
Sidewall of the Westerkerk

The Westerkerk (Dutch pronunciation: [ˈʋɛstərˌkɛr(ə)k]; English: Western Church) was a Protestant church on the Kruiskade in Rotterdam, Netherlands completed in 1870 and destroyed in the bombing of Rotterdam in May 1940.

== Architecture ==
The Westerkerk was designed by architect J.A. Jurriaanse in an eclectic mix of styles, the tower was neo-Gothic, front and side walls Neo-Romanesque and the interior referred to the seventeenth-century Protestant churches, like the New Church in Haarlem.

== History ==
The church was fully paid for by the Dutch Reformed Church itself. On December 28, 1867 procurement began. The building was eventually contracted to G. Key. On June 12, 1868 the first stone was laid and exactly two years later, First Pentecost 1870, the church was in use. The pastor during the service, Rev. W.Th. of Griethuysen, choose the text Matthew 21 verse 13: "It is written, My house shall be called a house of prayer."

Frans Lion Cachet was at the church beginning in 1883.

During the Bombing of Rotterdam in 1940 the church was damaged beyond repair. Replacing the Westerkerk and the Zuiderkerk in the Glashaven in 1960 was the Paulus Church in the Mauritsweg.
