= Dutch Reformed Church, Utrecht =

Church in Utrecht, South Africa

Dutch Reformed Church
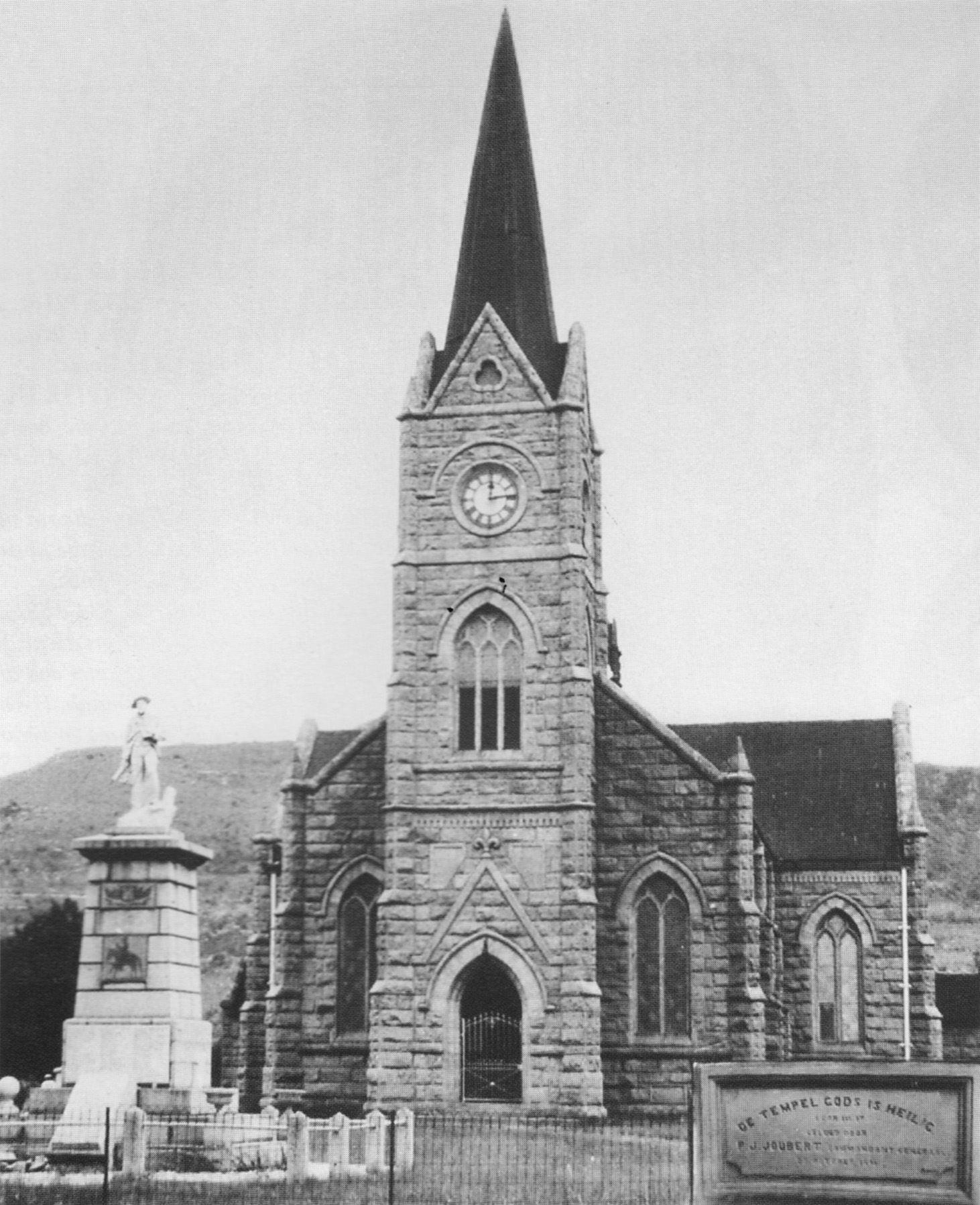
- Dutch Reformed Church
- 27.6544°S 30.3196°E
- Location: Utrecht
- Country: South Africa
- Denomination: Nederduits Gereformeerde Kerk

History
- Founded: 1854

Architecture
- Functional status: Church

The Dutch Reformed Church in Utrecht is a congregation of the Dutch Reformed Church in the province and Synod of KwaZulu-Natal. With its foundation on 19 November 1854, Utrecht was the 61st congregation of the Church and only the third congregation in the Colony of Natal. At the time of its centenary celebration in 1954, two years after Utrecht and the other congregations in the eponymous precinct of the Transvaal were transferred to the Natal Church, Utrecht had a membership of about 850 and a population of 1,350. Sixty years later, the membership was about 320 and the population was approximately 450.

== Background ==
The current Synod of KwaZulu-Natal was called the "traveling congregation of the Reformed Church to Port Natal" in its early years. The third trek of the Voortrekkers, or emigrant farmers as they were then called, who set out from Graaff-Reinet in September 1836 under the leadership of Gerrit Maritz, were the indirect founders of the Natal Church. These trekkers wanted to establish their own Christian state and thus escape the colonial rule in the Cape Colony's policy of anglicization and equalization.

The Cape Church was unable to provide these trekkers with the regular ministry of the Word and sacraments, especially because there was a glaring shortage of ministers in the Cape Church's widespread congregations, which was only partially alleviated by the arrival of 16 Scottish ministers from 1818 to 1836. The Cape Church did make repeated attempts to send ministers to the Voortrekkers from time to time. A missionary from the London Missionary Society, Erasmus Smit, married to a sister of Gerrit Maritz, accompanied the trek. Smit was already 58 years old at the time and his health was failing, but he was the spiritual leader of the trekkers and their children. Although many of the trekkers, especially the followers of Andries Potgieter, did not want to recognize him as their minister because he was not "ordained", and consequently, as long as the camp was near Thaba Nchu, they preferred to attend the services of the Wesleyan missionary and printe James Archbell (1798–1866), Smit was nevertheless faithful in the performance of his duties. He preached twice on Sunday, usually under a box tarp, held catechisms and confirmed marriages. When a commando was sent out to meet the enemy, a prayer meeting was regularly held on Wednesday evening, while the first Monday of the month was set aside to pray for the expansion of Christianity throughout the world.

On 8 February 1837, the first tentative attempt was made at Thaba Nchu to establish a church organization, and the first men were appointed to it at a civil meeting, namely J.S. Maritz as elder and C. Viljoen and Sarel Cilliers as deacons. But in April 1837, Piet Retief joined the movement and was elected "Governor and Chief Commander" soon after his arrival. The arrangement of church affairs was one of the first points to which he gave attention, and the first step towards this was the appointment of the Rev. Smit as "pastor of the travelling congregation". On Sunday 23 April 1837, the newly appointed pastor delivered his "dedication sermon", but there was an objection that he would read his confirmation form himself. The governor thought it best to postpone the confirmation and on Sunday 21 May 1837, Smit was presented to the congregation by a claim from the governor and then requested to read his confirmation form himself and answer it. No objections were raised, but many Voortrekkers distanced themselves from him. Rev. Erasmus immediately used his official status to uphold his Church and confession. while the governor kneeled before the pulpit, held the left hand on the open Bible and raised the fingers of the right hand during the taking of the oath. Thus, when he noticed that in the Oath of Office formula that Piet Retief took as governor on 6 June 1837 no mention was made of the protection of the confession of the Church, he asked that the governor take a further oath before the congregation on the following Sunday, 11 June 1837, after the sermon, take a further oath before the congregation while the governor kneels before the pulpit, holds the left hand on the open Bible and raises the fingers of the right hand during the taking of the oath.

== Ministers ==
- Frans Lion Cachet, 27 May 1865–1873
- H.L. Neethling, August 1874–1893 (his only congregation)
- A.J.B. Albertyn, 1894–1921 (died on 26 November that year)
- Lourens Matthys Kriel, 1921–1939 (accepts his emeritus position)
- Johannes Christoffel Jansen, 1957–1961
- André Francois Malan, 1967–1971
- Willem Izak Louw Bosman, 1980–1983
- Machiel Christoffel Emanuel Dames, 12 December 1981 – present

== Sources ==
- (in Afrikaans) Gerdener, dr. G.B.A.. 1934. Ons kerk in die Transgariep. Geskiedenis van die Ned. Geref. Kerke in Natal, Vrystaat en Transvaal. Kaapstad: Die Suid-Afrikaanse Bybelvereniging.
- (in Afrikaans) Hopkins, ds. H.C. 1966. Die Nederduitse Gereformeerde Kerk Rondebosch 1891–1966. Kaapstad: Feeskomitee van die N.G. Kerk, Rondebosch.
- (in Dutch) Maeder, ds. G.A. en Zinn, Christian. 1917. Ons Kerk Album. Kaapstad: Ons Kerk Album Maatschappij Bpkt.
- (in Afrikaans) Oberholster, dr. J.A.S. 1948. Jaarboek van die Gefedereerde Nederduitse Gereformeerde Kerke, 1949. Kaapstad: Jaarboek-kommissie van die Raad van die Kerke.
- (in Afrikaans) Olivier, ds. P.L. (samesteller). 1952. Ons gemeentelike feesalbum. Kaapstad en Pretoria: N.G. Kerk-uitgewers.
- (in Afrikaans) Thom, dr. H.B.. 1949. Die Geloftekerk en Ander Studies oor die Groot Trek. Kaapstad: Nasionale Pers, Beperk.
