= Jan Preuyt =

South African rugby union footballer and coach, and schoolteacher

- Born: 1923
- Died: 27 April 2006 (aged 82–83)

Jan Preuyt (1923 – 27 April 2006) was the South African chairman of the South African Schools Rugby Association for 25 years. He was also instrumental in the establishment of the Craven Week rugby tournament.

== Early life and education ==
While studying at Stellenbosch University he was noticed by his mentor and coach Danie Craven. Preuyt played for Griqualand and was a Junior Springbok in the early 1950s. Local clubs Cambridge and Buffaloes later had his services in their teams.

== Career ==
He taught at the East London Technical College from 1956 and ended his teaching career as Deputy Principal of Port Rex Technical High School in 1987. He started rugby at the Port Rex in 1956 and coached the first team until he retired 31 years later.

He served as chairman of Border Schools and South Africa Schools Rugby Association for 25 years. In 1974 and 1983 he was manager of the South Africa Schools Teams which toured Italy, France and Wales respectively. In later years he organised other codes of sport, and in 1986 he was the first president of the South Africa Schools Union (all codes).
