= Hoër Tegniese Skool Middelburg =

Coordinates: 25.7753°S 29.4612°E

- Middelburg, Mpumalanga; South Africa

Information
- Type: Public & Boarding
- Motto: Ons dien (We serve)
- Religious affiliation: Christianity
- Established: 1927; 99 years ago
- School number: +27 (013) 282 6029
- Headmaster: Mnr. Malem van Heerden
- Staff: 100 full-time
- Grades: 8–12
- Gender: Boys & Girls
- Age: 14 to 18
- Enrollment: 1,500 pupils
- Language: Afrikaans
- Schedule: 07:30 - 14:00
- Campus: Urban Campus
- Colours: Blue; Red; White
- Mascot: Rooibul
- Nickname: HTS
- Rival: Hoërskool Middelburg
- Website: htsmiddelburg.co.za

HTS Middelburg is a public Afrikaans medium co-educational technical high school situated in Middelburg in the Mpumalanga province of South Africa. It is now open to both genders.

== Offered sports ==
- Rugby
- Netball
- Tennis
- Chess
- Squash
- Air Shooting
- Cross country running
- Cricket
- Jukskei
- Hockey
- Golf
- Athletics
- Mountain Biking
- Robotics

== History ==
- April 1927 - The eenman-wamakerskool gets moved from Belfast to Middelburg. The principal was Mr. Lampen, and there were 5 students.
- September 1927 - Mr. S.J.H. Mostert becomes principal.
- January 1929 - Mr. J.P. Pretorius becomes principal.
- 1930 - The school obtains a total of 65 students.
- 12 September 1934 - The Governor General visits the school and declares 2 October a public holiday.
- 13 August 1942 - Mr. J.P. Pretorius dies in Madagascar while serving for the S.A.W. (Suid Afrika Weermag) -- South African Army
- 18 January 1943 - Mr. J.M. Theron becomes the new principal.
- 1 July 1945 - Mr D.G. Smith becomes the new principal.
- 21 January 1947 - The school obtains a total of 158 students.
- 14 April 1964 - Mr. L.E. Smith becomes the new principal.
- 20 January 1965 - The school obtains a total of 545 students.
- 16 September 1971 - Mr. Z.L. Benadé becomes the new principal.
- 25 January 1972 - The school obtains a total of 735 students.
- 28 March 1981 - Mr. J.F.W. Potgieter becomes the new principal.
- 6 January 1982 - The first 10 girls are allowed to attend the school.
- January 1987 - The school obtains a total of 1320 students.
- 1983 - 8 technical subjects are provided by the school.
- 1 January 1994 - Mr. H.J. Miles of Belfast becomes the new principal.
- 2001 - Mr. Jonker becomes the new principal.

== Notable alumni ==
List of the matriculants of Hoër Tegniese Skool Middelburg.

- Kwagga Smith (Class of 2011) South African professional rugby player.

- Bakkies Botha Former South African professional rugby player.
