= Frans Lion Cachet =

Dutch minister and writer (1835–1899)

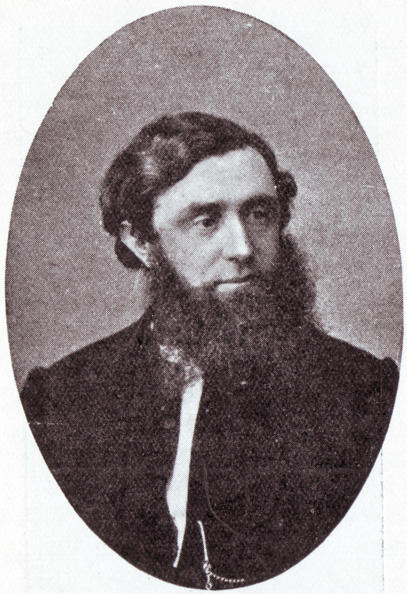
- Born: Frans Lion Cachet; 28 January 1835; Amsterdam, Netherlands
- Died: November 27, 1899 (aged 64); Bergen op Zoom, Netherlands
- Occupations: Writer and minister
- Writing career
- Language: Dutch

Frans Lion Cachet (28 January 1835, Amsterdam – 27 November 1899, Bergen op Zoom) was a Dutch minister and writer.

== Life and work ==
Frans Lion Cachet was born a Jew in Amsterdam on 28 January 1835, one of five children. In 1849, the entire family converted to Christianity under the influence of the Dutch poet Isaac da Costa. He was then baptized on 30 September 1849 in the Noorder-Kerk in Amsterdam and accepted as a member of the Reformed Congregation of Amsterdam.

At the Scottish Seminary in Amsterdam he studied theology to be trained for foreign missions in the service of the Free Church of Scotland. He also spent time in Ermelo with the philanthropist and missionary friend Rev. H.W. Witteveen. On 25 March 1858 he obtained his diploma from the Scottish Seminary. After this he left for South Africa on 6 April 1858 with the intention of doing missionary work among the heathen. On his arrival in Cape Town he applied to Rev. Abraham Faure to be legitimized as a minister of the Dutch Reformed Church. The request was refused because he only had a missionary diploma. On 28 September 1858 he married Yda Johanna Jacoba van Reenen, originally from Claremont, in Wynberg, Cape Town. The couple had two children, but the eldest died a few weeks after birth.

For a while he worked in St. Stephen's Church in Cape Town among the Coloureds and in the Ebenezer congregation among the Muslims. With the help of the black missionary Tyo Soga, after a preliminary examination, he was ordained by the Church of Scotland in their territory at Alice on the Eastern Border on 26 October 1860. Although Cachet continued to work in Cape Town after this, Rev. Piet Huet of Pietermaritzburg invited him to act as acting minister of the Dutch Reformed Church in Ladysmith in Natal in 1861. During the Synod of November 1862, after a colloquium doctum was held with him, he was legitimized as a minister in the Dutch Reformed Church. In May 1863 he was confirmed as minister of Ladysmith and also as consultant to the congregations of Harrismith in the Free State and Utrecht in the Transvaal. His interest in the mission led him to do important pioneering work in Natal in this area.

After his departure from Ladysmith, he became a pastor in Utrecht on 27 May 1865. At this time, there was great confusion in the ecclesiastical and political fields in this region. Utrecht was a settlement outside the borders of Natal, but also outside the borders of the Transvaal Republic. It was founded in 1854, after which it was incorporated into the Lydenburg Republic in 1858 and in turn into the larger Zuid-Afrikaansche Republiek in 1860. After a court case, the Cape High Court ruled that no one residing outside the Cape Colony could belong to the Synod of the Dutch Reformed Church of the Cape, which meant that existing members of the Dutch Reformed Church had to first constitute themselves in separate congregations. After Utrecht and Lydenburg were separated from the Cape Church by this ruling, they were reassigned to the Ring of Natal. Cachet took advantage of the confusion in the church area by subsequently establishing the Dutch Reformed Church of Transvaal in 1866, based on the strength of Lydenburg and Utrecht. This Dutch Reformed Church is independent of the State Church of the geographical area in which these congregations are located, namely the Reformed Church and this at a time when church and state in the Transvaal were practically one. Cachet was instrumental in the establishment of further Dutch Reformed congregations in the Transvaal, including in Potchefstroom. His brochure, which appeared in 1866, entitled Aan de leden der Ned. Geref. Kerk in de Zuid-Afrikaansche Republiek, is a thinly veiled attack on the Reformed Church, against which Rev. Van der Hoff of the Reformed Church defends himself. After this there can be no question of rapprochement between the two church bodies.

In 1873 Cachet returned to the Netherlands, where he was a traveling minister of the Confessional Association for a year and from 1874 to 1875 minister of the Dutch Reformed Church in Nieuw-Loosdrecht. However, he returned to the Cape in 1876 and was confirmed as minister in Villiersdorp by Rev. P.J.G. de Vos on 5 August 1876. During this time he wrote extensively, including in publications such as Het Zuid-Afrikaansch Tijdschrift and Die Stem van Israel. After the annexation of the Transvaal by England in 1877, he spent eight months in the Transvaal to advise the Boers there and encourage them in their resistance against England. However, in 1880 he decided to return to the Netherlands again, this time for good. On 5 March 1880 he left Villiersdorp. Upon his arrival in the Netherlands, he was a minister in Valkenburg from 1880 to 1883 and a minister of the Reformed Church in Rotterdam from 1883 to 1887. In 1887 he joined De Doleantie, a movement that sought and achieved affiliation with the Reformed Church, and in this denomination he was a minister in Rotterdam until his death. In 1890, as a deputy of the Synod, he undertook a journey to Java in the East in the interests of the Mission and published a book about this journey. On the return journey, he also visited Egypt and Palestine. He died on 27 November 1899 in Bergen-op-Zoom in the Netherlands.

== Writing work ==
In 1875, Fifteen Years in South Africa was published, which is a collection of letters to a friend and an account of his stay in South Africa. This publication sheds much light on the history of the Dutch Reformed Church in Natal and the Transvaal. This was followed by Two Years in Holland. He is best known for his De wornstelstrijd der Transvalers aan het Volk van Nederland verhaald, which often tells the history of the South African Republic like a novel. His book Een jaar op reis in dienst der Zending has as its theme the journey he undertook to the East in 1891. A collection of his Afrikaans sermons was published in 1874. He also wrote a biography of his friend Tyo Soga, Tyo Soga De eerste kafferzendeling, an adaptation of Chalmers' Tyo Soga: A page of South African Mission Work. Other writings by him include his paper What place should the Christian mission among the Gentiles occupy in the intimate love and practical activity of the colonial church, which appears as an appendix to Elpis's compilation of the lectures given at the Christian Conference held in Cape Town on 16 and 17 January 1861. To the members of the Dutch Reformed Church in the Ladismidt congregation is a circular dated 1864.

== Bibliography ==
- Antonissen, Rob “Die Afrikaanse letterkunde van aanvang tot hede” Nasou Beperk Derde hersiene uitgawe Tweede druk 1964
- Conradie, Elizabeth “Hollandse skrywers in Suid-Afrika (Deel 2) (1875–1905) J.H. de Bussy/H.A.U.M, Kaapstad/Pretoria, 1949
- Kannemeyer, J.C. “Geskiedenis van die Afrikaanse literatuur 1” Academica, Pretoria en Kaapstad Tweede druk 1984
- Nienaber, P.J. “Hier is ons skrywers!” Afrikaanse Pers-Boekhandel Johannesburg Eerste uitgawe 1949
