= Middelburg, Mpumalanga =

Middelburg
- Town
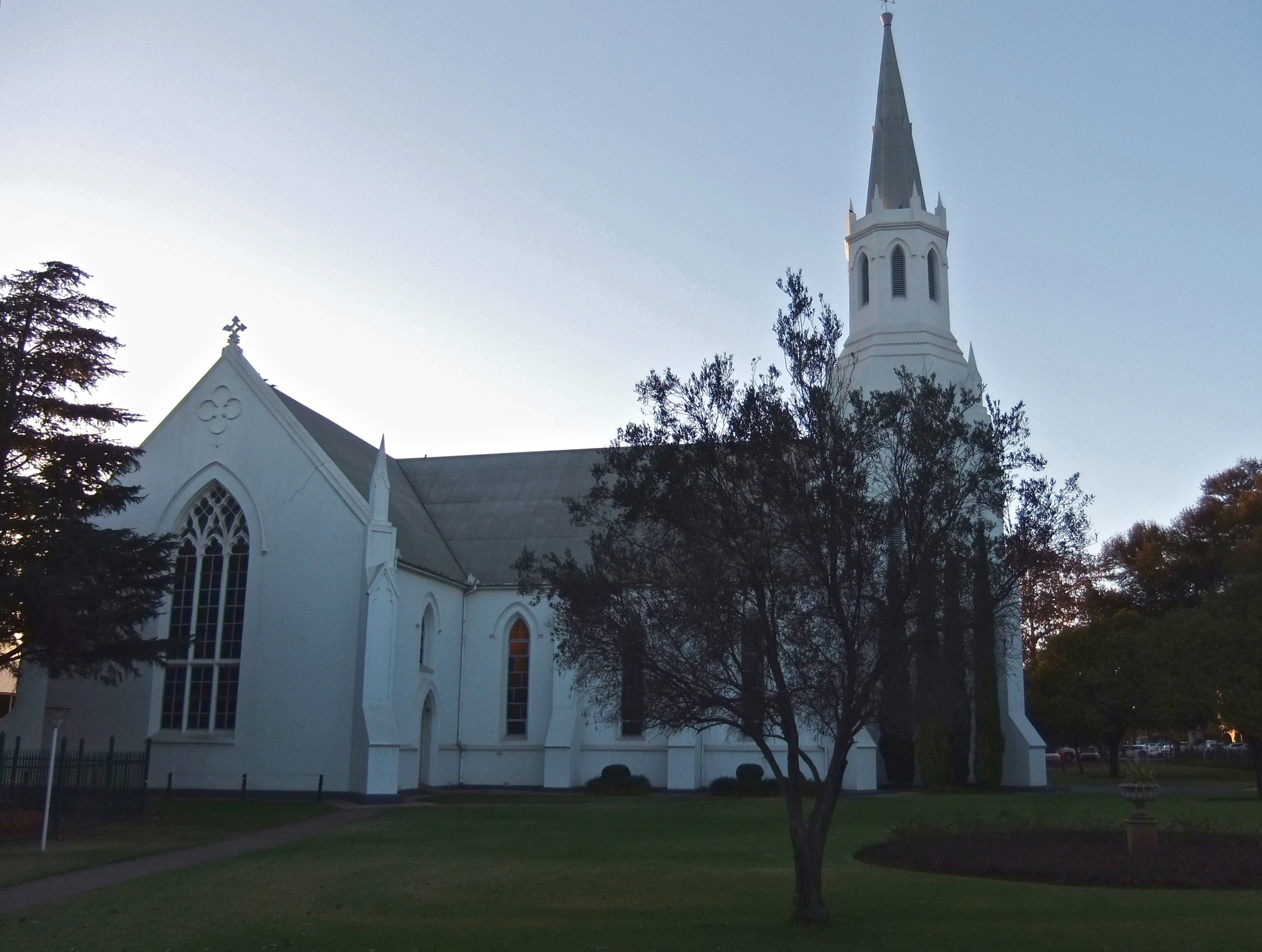
- The Dutch Reformed Church

- Location within Mpumalanga Location within South Africa Location within Africa
- Coordinates: 25°46′05″S 29°27′17″E
- Country: South Africa
- Province: Mpumalanga
- District: Nkangala
- Municipality: Steve Tshwete
- Established: 1864
  - Councillor: (ANC)

Area
  - Total: 117.40 km^{2} (45.33 sq mi)
- Elevation: 1,490 m (4,890 ft)

Population (2011)
  - Total: 87,348
  - Density: 744.02/km^{2} (1,927.0/sq mi)

Racial makeup (2011)
  - Black African: 41.6%
  - Coloured: 5.6%
  - Indian/Asian: 3.8%
  - White: 48.5%
  - Other: 0.5%

First languages (2011)
  - Afrikaans: 50.3%
  - Zulu: 12.4%
  - English: 11.1%
  - Northern Sotho: 7.6%
  - Other: 18.6%
- Time zone: UTC+2 (SAST)
- Postal code (street): 1055
- PO box: 1050

Middelburg is a large town in the South African province of Mpumalanga.

== History ==
It was initially established as a halfway station between Lydenburg and Pretoria by the Republic of Lydenburg in 1860. That republic would merge with the South African Republic (ZAR) soon afterwards. The proposed town was established on two farms, Klipfontein and Keerom; but when the Dutch Reformed Church established a church next door on the farm Sterkfontein, the town would be moved there.

It was established as Nasareth in 1864 by the Voortrekkers on the banks of the Klein Olifants River. It was changed in 1872 to Middelburg to mark its location between the Transvaal capital Pretoria, and the gold mining town of Lydenburg. The Dutch Reformed Church locally known as the Witkerk (White church). The building was designed by the 'bouwmeester' (architect) Carl Otto Hager, and built in 1890.

The British built a large concentration camp in Middelburg during the Second Boer War. The Commemorative Hall was built at the site next to the 1,381 graves of women and children who died in the concentration camp.

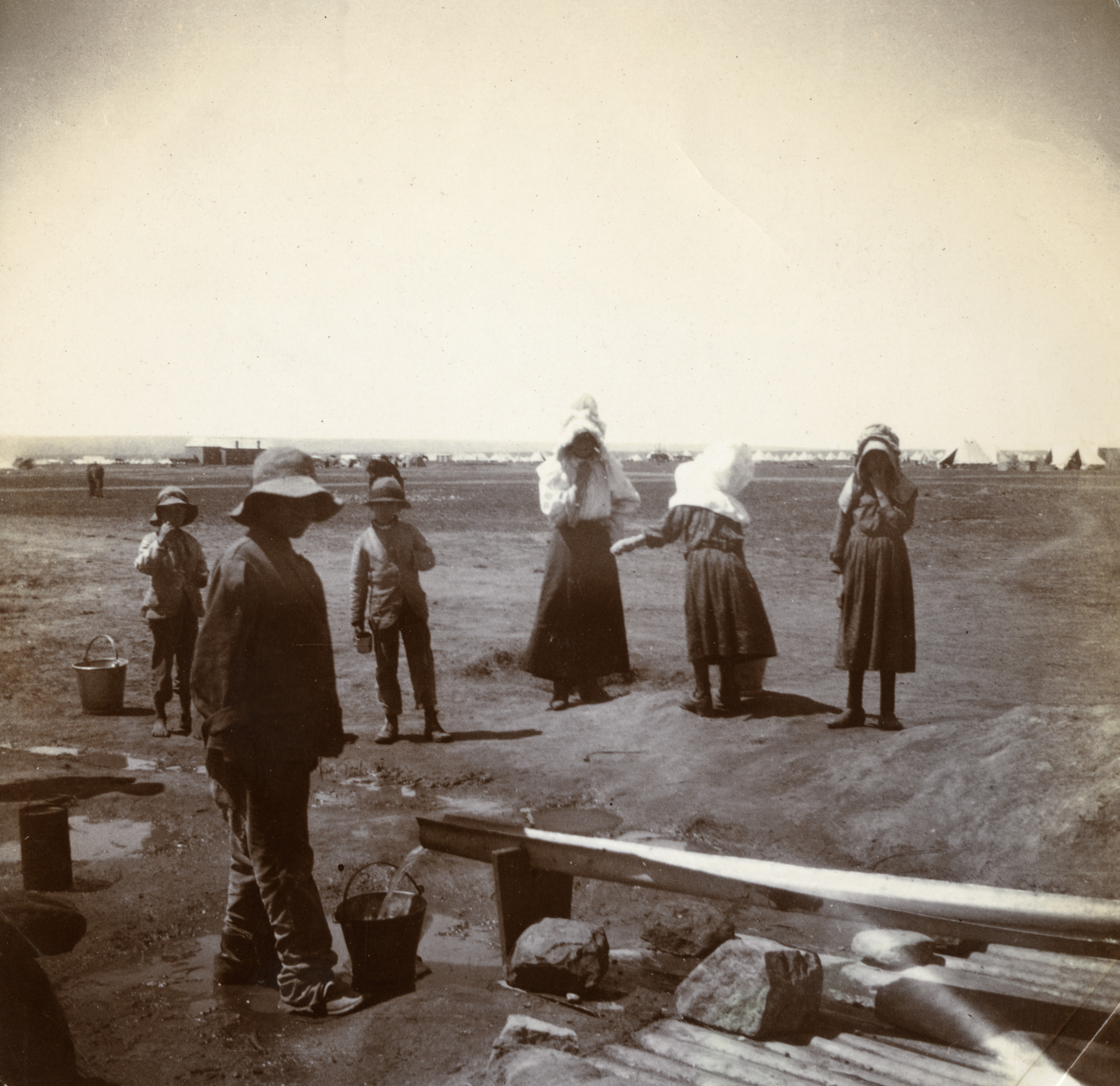
The British concentration camp of Middelburg, for Boers, c.1901

== Geography ==
=== Communities ===
- Aerorand - the newest suburb in Middelburg
- CBD - the youngest part of town
- Groenkol - upmarket renovated houses
- Dennesig - named after the conifer trees scattered through the suburb
- Golfsig - upmarket suburb with a view of the golf course
- Clubville - leafy suburb with a view of the golf course
- Industrial Area - various industrial businesses
- Kanonkop - translated as "Cannon Hill," referring to the days of the Anglo-Boer War, the site of the British concentration camp graveyard is to be found in the area
- Mhluzi - Previously African suburb during the Apartheid era
- Mineralia - suburb named after mineral deposits
- Nasareth - Previously Coloured suburb on the eastern side of Middelburg
- Eastdene - Previously Indian suburb
- Rockdale -a residential area on the Remaining Extent of the farm Rockdale 442 JS
- Hlalmnandi

== Demographics ==
Hundreds of expatriates and their families, mostly from the United Kingdom and other parts of Europe, moved into the town in the 1950s, 1960s and 1970s to avoid the slump of the post-World War II industrial and manufacturing sectors in those countries. These families were attracted by the need for industrial expertise in the plant, and were often rewarded with company-sponsored housing and discounted education.

The children of those immigrant families have either moved to the larger nearby cities of Witbank, Pretoria and Johannesburg, seeking employment, or have remained to form part of the growing alternative economic activities in the area.

Today, the town faces many issues typical to smaller towns in South Africa. These include challenges such as the incorporation, upliftment, and appropriate addressing of former inequalities of service provision and infrastructure in the large nearby townships and suburbs, that were created for the black and Indian populations, under apartheid laws. The cultural make up of the town is quite diverse, ranging from mainly Afrikaans-speaking families, migrants from the United Kingdom and Europe, as well as the indigenous African populations. Another challenge is addressing the general trend of the hastening migration of residents away from small towns to larger cities in search of greater economic opportunities.

With a 2016 population of 278,000 and a growth rate of 4.9%, the municipal statistical department has estimated that the population will be 500,000 by 2030. The town has one of the largest police forces in the region, a government (public) hospital and clinic, as well as a private hospital, shopping mall and several public schools.

=== Religion ===
Middelburg has a deep Christian origin, for the oldest Dutch Reformed church is the one mentioned above which is better known as "Die Witkerk."

Churches in the town are:

- The Dutch Reformed (NG Kerk)
- Nederduitsch Hervormde Kerk van Afrika (Nederduits Reformed Church of Africa) since 01.04.1864 - 2 parishes, Middelburg and Middelburg-Noord 28.08.1977
- AFM-AGS Apostolic Faith Mission (Lighuis Gemeente, Corpus Christi, AGS Sentraal)
- Pentecostal Protestant Church(Lofdal Gesinskerk, Woord-en-Kruis Gemeente.)
- Baptist
- New Independent Fundamentalist Baptist
- Methodist
- African Methodist Episcopal Church (Nazareth Chapel)
- Catholic
- Full Gospel Church (VEK Presence Church)
- Zion Christian Church
- Holy Trinity Anglican Church
- Independent Churches
- Evangelical Lutheran Church
- Lutheran Bapedi Church
- St Peter's Confessional Lutheran Church of South Africa
- Presbyterian
- ECF (Eastdene Christian Fellowship) 1988
- Shalom Christian Church
- Solid Ground Church

Various bazaars and markets are held by all churches in support of the community. Examples would be The Expo Art and craft market, which is held annually in the spring by Die Lighuis Gemeente. Corpus Christi also have a world class market which is widely known in the area as the Kersmark. The church community is closely involved in community upliftment and development.

== Economy ==
Columbus Stainless, a large stainless steel plant, constructed in 1965, and Thos Begbie & Co, a company established in 1887 by Scotsman Thomas Begbie, are both situated here. For many years, the industrial activities of the steel plant and its peripheral activities, such as coal and transport, provided much of the employment and largely drove the economy of the town, although other sectors, such as agriculture, have gradually grown to be important.

== Culture and contemporary life ==
=== Tourism ===
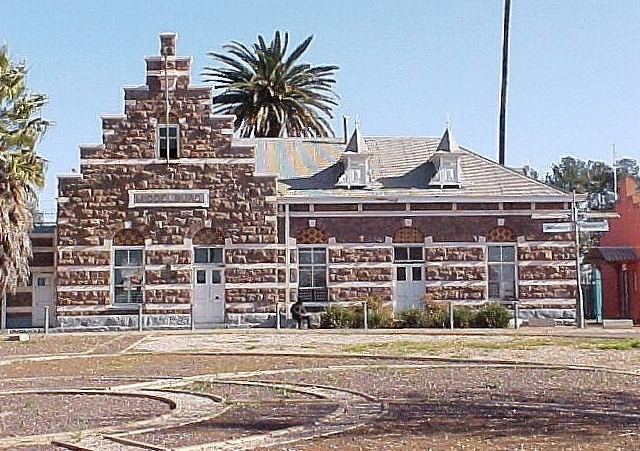
Middelburg railway station

The town is situated conveniently close to one of the main routes to the Kruger National Park, and has a small but growing tourism industry. Some landmarks and notable features in or around the town include the Middelburg Dam, site of the annual Middelburg Mile swimming event , the Botshabelo mission station museum and associated Ndebele tourist village, several hiking trails, and the Dutch Reformed church in the town centre. Within the town itself, several popular night spots and family restaurants entertain the locals and visiting tourists. Middelburg Mall was recently built, just off the N4 on the Bethal-Middelburg road and has a wide range of shops and restaurants.

== Sports ==
A well maintained country club provides facilities for tennis, bowls, a golf course, swimming pools, as well as a bar, hotel and dining and function rooms. Furthermore, you will find Kees Taljaard Park, which is primarily a rugby stadium, but also has hockey fields. A lot of the local festivals are hosted in this stadium as well.

== Schools ==
Middleburg offers a diversity of schools, with notable highschools such as Hoër Tegniese Skool Middelburg and Middelburg Hoërskool as well as Primary schools such as Laerskool kanonkop and Laerskool Middelburg.

The school economy in Middelburg is very well-funded.

== Infrastructure ==
=== Passenger rail ===
This city has a railway station for the loading and unloading of passengers and cargo on the Pretoria–Maputo railway.

== Notable people ==
- Wynand Claassen - South Africa national rugby union team captain of the 1981 South Africa rugby union tour of New Zealand and the United States, more famously known as the Rebel tour of New Zealand
- Clive Jaars - artist, lawyer, former Education and Training Officer at the University of South Africa (UNISA), specializing in constitutional law, statutory interpretation, and administrative justice.
- Happy Jele - footballer. One time captain of Orlando Pirates, and one of the longest serving players of Orlando Pirates.
- Esther Mahlangu - artist from the Ndebele nation. Known for her bold large-scale contemporary paintings that reference her Ndebele heritage.
- Vincent Mahlangu - actor and singer
- Gerhardus Pienaar - javelin thrower
- Nothando Vilakazi - Spanish Primera División & South Africa women's national football team player
- Kwagga Smith -South Africa national rugby union team player; educated at

Hoer Tegniese Skool Middelburg
