= 1996 South Africa rugby union tour of Argentina and Europe =

- Coach: Andre Markgraaff
- Tour captain: Gary Teichmann
- Top point scorer: Henry Honiball (53)
- Top try scorer: Breyton Paulse (5)
- Top test point scorer: Henry Honiball (53)
- Top test try scorer: Joost van der Westhuizen (4)
Summary
P	W	D	L
Total
10	8	0	2
Test match
5	5	0	0
Opponent
P	W	D	L
Argentina
2	2	0	0
France
2	2	0	0
Wales
1	1	0	0

The 1996 South Africa rugby union tour of Argentina and Europe was a series of rugby union matches played during November and December 1996 in Argentina, France and Wales by the South Africa national rugby union team.

At the same time, the second-level team, ("South Africa A") was involved in a tour of Great Britain and Ireland.

== The Springboks Tour ==
=== Touring party ===
- Manager–Coach: Andre Markgraaff
- Assistant coach: Hugh Reece-Edwards
- Assistant coach: Nick Mallett
- Assistant coach: Carel du Plessis (backline adviser)

Backs
Name	Position	Province
Andre Joubert	Fullback	Natal
Russell Bennett	Fullback	Border
Jacques Olivier	Wing	Northern Transvaal
James Small	Wing	Natal
Andre Snyman	Wing	Northern Transvaal
Justin Swart	Wing	Western Province
Breyton Paulse	Wing	Western Province
Hennie le Roux	Centre	Transvaal
Japie Mulder	Centre	Transvaal
Joe Gillingham	Centre	Transvaal
Jeremy Thomson	Centre	Natal
Dick Muir	Centre	Natal
Henry Honiball	Fly-half	Natal
Franco Smith	Fly-half	Griqualand West
Joost van der Westhuizen	Scrum-half	Northern Transvaal
Kevin Putt	Scrum-half	Natal
Joggie Viljoen	Scrum-half	Western Province

Forwards
Name	Position	Province
Marius Hurter	Prop	Northern Transvaal
Adrian Garvey	Prop	Natal
Dawie Theron	Prop	Griqualand West
Toks van der Linde	Prop	Western Province
Garry Pagel	Prop	Western Province
Henry Tromp	Hooker	Northern Transvaal
James Dalton	Hooker	Transvaal
Chris Rossouw	Hooker	Transvaal
Naka Drotské (sub)	Hooker	Free State
Mark Andrews	Lock	Natal
Kobus Wiese	Lock	Transvaal
Krynauw Otto	Lock	Northern Transvaal
Hannes Strydom	Lock	Transvaal
Ruben Kruger	Flanker	Northern Transvaal
André Venter	Flanker	Free State
Fritz van Heerden	Flanker	Western Province
Wayne Fyvie	Flanker	Natal
Theo Oosthuizen	Flanker	Griqualand West
Gary Teichmann (c)	Number 8	Natal
Schutte Bekker	Number 8	Northern Transvaal
Rassie Erasmus (sub)	Number 8	Free State

Legend: sub = Player that join the tour later as a replacement

=== Results ===
Scores and results list South Africa's points tally first.

No.	Date	Opponent	Venue	Result	For	Against	Status
1.	5 Nov 1996	Rosario	Duendes, Rosario	Won	45	36	Tour match
2.	9 Nov 1996	Argentina	Ferro Carrill Oeste Stadium, Buenos Aires	Won	46	15	Test match
3.	12 Nov 1996	Cuyo	Independiente Rivadavia Stadium, Mendoza	Won	89	19	Tour match
4.	16 Nov 1996	Argentina	Ferro Carrill Oeste Stadium, Buenos Aires	Won	44	21	Test match
5.	23 Nov 1996	French Barbarians	Municipal Stadium, Brive	Lost	22	30	Tour match
6.	26 Nov 1996	French Regional XV	Stade Gerland, Lyon	Won	36	20	Tour match
7.	30 Nov 1996	France	Parc Lescure, Bordeaux	Won	22	12	Test match
8.	3 Dec 1996	French Universities	Stade du Nord, Lille	Lost	13	20	Tour match
9.	7 Dec 1996	France	Parc des Princes, Paris	Won	13	12	Test match
10.	15 Dec 1996	Wales	Cardiff Arms Park, Cardiff	Won	37	20	Test match

=== Test Matches ===
==== First Test: Argentina ====
9 November 1996

Argentina	15–46	South Africa
Try: Camardón, Martin; Con: Cilley; Pen: Cilley		Try: Andrews, Venter, van der Westhuizen, Small, le Roux, Joubert; Con: Honiball (3), Joubert; Pen: Honiball

Ferro Carrill Oeste Stadium, Buenos Aires
Attendance: 16,000
Referee: Jim Fleming (Scotland)

Team details

Argentina			South Africa
Facundo Soler	FB	15	FB	Andre Joubert
Octavio Bartolucci	W	14	W	James Small
(substituted off) 42' Gonzalo Camardón	C	13	C	Japie Mulder
(capt.) Lisandro Arbizu	C	12	C	Hennie le Roux
Tomás Solari	W	11	W	Jacques Olivier
José Cilley	FH	10	FH	Henry Honiball
Nicolás Fernández Miranda	SH	9	SH	Joost van der Westhuizen
Pablo Camerlinckx	N8	8	N8	Gary Teichmann (capt.)
Raúl Pérez	F	7	F	Andre Venter
Rolando Martín	F	6	F	Ruben Kruger
Pedro Sporleder	L	5	L	Mark Andrews
German Llanes	L	4	L	Kobus Wiese (substituted off) 77'
Omar Hasan	P	3	P	Adrian Garvey
Federico Méndez	H	2	H	James Dalton
Roberto Diego Grau	P	1	P	Dawie Theron (substituted off) 65'
		Replacements
Christian Barrea		16		Andre Snyman
(substituted in) 42' Eduardo Simone		17		Kevin Putt
Ignacio Fernández Lobbe		18		Henry Tromp
Carlos Promanzio		19		Toks van der Linde (substituted in) 65'
Cristián Viel		20		Wayne Fyvie
Martín Scelzo		21		Fritz van Heerden (substituted in) 77'
		Coaches
				Andre Markgraaff

==== Second Test: Argentina ====
16 November 1996

Argentina	21–44	South Africa
Try: Fernandez Miranda, Martin; Con: Cilley; Pen: Cilley (2), Quesada		Try: Kruger (2), le Roux, Mulder, Olivier, Venter; Con: Honiball (4); Pen: Honiball (2)

Ferro Carrill Oeste Stadium, Buenos Aires
Attendance: 20,000
Referee: Ed Murray (Scotland)

Team details

Argentina			South Africa
Ezequiel Jurado	FB	15	FB	Andre Joubert
Diego Albanese	W	14	W	James Small (substituted off) 65'
Eduardo Simone	C	13	C	Japie Mulder
(capt.) Lisandro Arbizu	C	12	C	Hennie le Roux
Facundo Soler	W	11	W	Jacques Olivier
(substituted off) José Cilley	FH	10	FH	Henry Honiball
(substituted off) Nicolás Fernández Miranda	SH	9	SH	Joost van der Westhuizen
(substituted off) (substituted in) Pablo Camerlinckx	N8	8	N8	Gary Teichmann (capt.) (substituted off) 75'
Raúl Pérez	F	7	F	Andre Venter
Rolando Martín	F	6	F	Ruben Kruger
(substituted off) Pedro Sporleder	L	5	L	Mark Andrews (substituted off) 68'
German Llanes	L	4	L	Kobus Wiese
(substituted off) Omar Hasan	P	3	P	Adrian Garvey
Federico Méndez	H	2	H	James Dalton (substituted off) 68'
Roberto Diego Grau	P	1	P	Dawie Theron (substituted off) 70'
		Replacements
Ignacio Fernández Lobbe		16		Andre Snyman (substituted in) 65'
(substituted in) Christian Barrea		17		Kevin Putt
Carlos Promanzio		18		Henry Tromp (substituted in) 68'
(substituted in) Martín Scelzo		19		Toks van der Linde (substituted in) 70'
(substituted in) (substituted off) (substituted in) Cristián Viel		20		Wayne Fyvie (substituted in) 75'
(substituted in) Gonzalo Quesada		21		Fritz van Heerden (substituted in) 68'
		Coaches
				Andre Markgraaff

==== First Test: France ====
30 November 1996

France	12–22	South Africa
Pen: Dourthe (4)		Try: Joubert, Small; Pen: Honiball (4)

Stade du Parc Lescure, Bordeaux
Attendance: 30,000
Referee: Brian Stirling (Ireland)

Team details

France			South Africa
Jean-Luc Sadourny	FB	15	FB	Andre Joubert
Richard Dourthe	W	14	W	James Small
(substituted off) 65' Stephane Glas	C	13	C	Japie Mulder
(substituted off) 59' Guillaume Bouic	C	12	C	Hennie le Roux
(substituted off) 47' David Berty	W	11	W	Jacques Olivier
Laurent Mazas	FH	10	FH	Henry Honiball
Philippe Carbonneau	SH	9	SH	Joost van der Westhuizen
(substituted off) 57' Thierry Labrousse	N8	8	N8	Gary Teichmann (capt.)
(capt.) Abdelatif Benazzi	F	7	F	Andre Venter
Philippe Benetton	F	6	F	Ruben Kruger
Fabien Pelous	L	5	L	Mark Andrews
Hugues Miorin	L	4	L	Kobus Wiese
Franck Tournaire	P	3	P	Adrian Garvey
(substituted off) 71' Marc de Rougemont	H	2	H	James Dalton (substituted off) 77'
Christian Califano	P	1	P	Dawie Theron (substituted off) 69'
		Replacements
(substituted in) 47' David Venditti		16		Andre Snyman
(substituted in) 59' Christophe Lamaison		17		Kevin Putt
(substituted in) 65' Guy Accoceberry		18		Henry Tromp (substituted in) 77'
(substituted in) 57' Richard Castel		19		Toks van der Linde (substituted in) 69'
(substituted in) 71' Marc Dal Maso		20		Wayne Fyvie
Jean-Jacques Crenca		21		Fritz van Heerden
		Coaches
Jean-Claude Skrela				Andre Markgraaff

==== Second Test: France ====
7 December 1996

France	12–13	South Africa
Pen: Dourthe (4)		Try: Dalton; Con: Honiball; Pen: Honiball (2)

Parc des Princes, Paris
Attendance: 40,000
Referee: Derek Bevan (Wales)

Team details

France			South Africa
Jean-Luc Sadourny	FB	15	FB	Andre Joubert
Laurent Leflamand	W	14	W	James Small
Richard Dourthe	C	13	C	Japie Mulder
Stephane Glas	C	12	C	Hennie le Roux
David Venditti	W	11	W	Jacques Olivier
Christophe Lamaison	FH	10	FH	Henry Honiball
Guy Accoceberry	SH	9	SH	Joost van der Westhuizen
(capt.) Abdelatif Benazzi	N8	8	N8	Gary Teichmann (capt.)
Richard Castel	F	7	F	Andre Venter
(substituted off) 65' Philippe Benetton	F	6	F	Ruben Kruger
Fabien Pelous	L	5	L	Mark Andrews
Olivier Merle	L	4	L	Kobus Wiese
(substituted off) 73' Franck Tournaire	P	3	P	Adrian Garvey
Marc Dal Maso	H	2	H	James Dalton
Christian Califano	P	1	P	Dawie Theron
		Replacements
Guillaume Bouic		16		Andre Snyman
Philippe Carbonneau		17		Kevin Putt
Marc de Rougemont		18		Henry Tromp
(substituted in) 73' Jean-Jacques Crenca		19		Toks van der Linde
(substituted in) 65' Marc Lievremont		20		Wayne Fyvie
Hugues Miorin		21		Fritz van Heerden
		Coaches
Jean-Claude Skrela				Andre Markgraaff

==== Test: Wales ====
15 December 1996

Wales	20–37	South Africa
Try: A Thomas; Pen: N Jenkins (5)		Try: Joubert, Olivier, van der Westhuizen (3); Con: Honiball (2), Joubert; Pen: Honiball (2)

Cardiff Arms Park, Cardiff
Attendance: 45,200
Referee: Steve Lander (England)

Team details

Wales			South Africa
Neil Jenkins	FB	15	FB	Andre Joubert
Ieuan Evans	W	14	W	James Small
Allan Bateman	C	13	C	Japie Mulder
Scott Gibbs	C	12	C	Hennie le Roux
Dafydd James	W	11	W	Jacques Olivier (substituted off) 76'
Arwel Thomas	FH	10	FH	Henry Honiball
Rob Howley	SH	9	SH	Joost van der Westhuizen
Steve Williams	N8	8	N8	Gary Teichmann (capt.)
Colin Charvis	F	7	F	Andre Venter
(substituted off) 68' Dale McIntosh	F	6	F	Ruben Kruger
Mark Rowley	L	5	L	Mark Andrews (substituted off) 41'
Gareth Llewellyn	L	4	L	Kobus Wiese
Dai Young	P	3	P	Adrian Garvey
(capt.) Jonathan Humphreys	H	2	H	James Dalton
Christian Loader	P	1	P	Dawie Theron (substituted off) 20'
		Replacements
Leigh Davies		16		Andre Snyman (substituted in) 76'
Lee Jarvis		17		Kevin Putt
Paul John		18		Henry Tromp
(substituted in) 68' Nathan Thomas		19		Toks van der Linde (substituted in) 20'
Lyndon Mustoe		20		Wayne Fyvie
Garin Jenkins		21		Hannes Strydom (substituted in) 41'
		Coaches
Kevin Bowring				Andre Markgraaff

== The South Africa "A" Tour ==
=== Touring party ===
- Manager: Arthob Petersen
- Coach: Manie Spamer
- Assistant coaches: Eric Sauls and Gert Smal

Backs
Name	Position	Province
Dawie du Toit	Fullback	Northern Transvaal
Ricardo Loubscher	Fullback	Eastern Province
Jorrie Kruger (sub)	Fullback	Free State
Marius Goosen	Utility Back	Boland
Hannes Venter	Wing	Northern Transvaal
Chivago Breda	Wing	Northern Transvaal
Joos Joubert	Wing	Natal
Deon Kayser	Wing	Eastern Province
Jannie van der Walt	Wing	Transvaal
Edrich Lubbe	Centre	Griqualand West
Tinus Linee	Centre	Western Province
Marius Moolman	Centre	Boland
McNeil Hendricks	Centre	Natal
MJ Smith	Fly-half	Free State
Louis Koen	Fly-half	Western Province
Christoff Lötter	Scrum-half	Boland
Gerald Scholtz	Scrum-half	Western Province
Werner Swanepoel (sub)	Scrum-half	Free State

Forwards
Name	Position	Province
De Waal Venter	Prop	Griqualand West
Ollie le Roux	Prop	Natal
Robbie Kempson	Prop	Natal
Willie Meyer	Prop	Eastern Province
Naka Drotské (c)	Hooker	Free State
Dale Santon	Hooker	Boland
Braam Els	Lock	Free State
Ryno Opperman	Lock	Free State
Hottie Louw	Lock	Western Province
Cecil du Plessis	Lock	Eastern Province
Rassie Erasmus	Loose forward	Free State
John Williams	Loose forward	Northern Transvaal
Fred Tiema	Loose forward	Eastern Province
Trevor Arendse	Loose forward	Western Province
Jannie Coetzee	Loose forward	Boland
Philip Smit	Loose forward	Griqualand West
Corné Krige	Loose forward	Western Province
Andre Vos (sub)	Loose forward	Eastern Province

Legend: sub = Player that join the tour later as a replacement

=== Results ===
Scores and results list South Africa's points tally first.

No.	Date	Opponent	Venue	For	Against	Status
1	1 November 1996	Cambridge University	Grange Road, Cambridge	57	11	Tour match
2	4 November 1996	Bedford	Goldington Road, Bedford	47	27	Tour match
3	8 November 1996	Scotland A	Mansfield Park, Hawick	19	32	Tour match
4	12 November 1996	Ireland A	Donnybrook, Dublin	25	28	Tour match
5	16 November 1996	Oxford University	Iffley Road, Oxford	49	12	Tour match
6	21 November 1996	South West Counties	County Ground, Exeter	62	20	Tour match
7	23 November 1996	London Counties	Twickenham, London	43	17	Tour match
8	27 November 1996	Northern Counties	Gateshead, Newcastle	29	13	Tour match
9	30 November 1996	Midland Counties	Butts Park Arena, Coventry	62	7	Tour match
10	9 December 1996	Cardiff	Cardiff Arms Park, Cardiff	40	7	Tour match
11	11 December 1996	England A	Kingsholm Stadium, Gloucester	35	20	Tour match
12	14 December 1996	Wales A	St. Helen's, Swansea	42	26	Tour match

== See also ==
- History of rugby union matches between Argentina and South Africa
- History of rugby union matches between France and South Africa
- History of rugby union matches between South Africa and Wales
