= 1997 British Lions tour to South Africa =

Rugby union team tour

- Date: 24 May – 5 July
- Coach(es): (Scotland) Ian McGeechan (Scotland) Jim Telfer
- Tour captain: (England) Martin Johnson
- Test series winners: British Lions (2–1)
- Top point scorer: (England) Tim Stimpson (111)
- Top try scorer(s): (England) John Bentley (7) (England) Tony Underwood (7)
- Top test point scorer: (Wales) Neil Jenkins (41)
- Top test try scorer: (England) Matt Dawson (2)
Summary
P	W	D	L
Total
13	11	0	2
Test match
3	2	0	1
Opponent
P	W	D	L
South Africa
3	2	0	1

Tour chronology
- ← New Zealand 1993 Australia 2001 →

The 1997 British Lions tour to South Africa was a series of matches played by the British Lions rugby union team in South Africa. The much-anticipated tour was the first after the end of apartheid in South Africa, and the first British Lions tour since rugby union turned professional. It was only the third time that a touring side won a test series in South Africa; the others being the 1974 Lions and the 1996 All Blacks.

A documentary Living with Lions was produced and contains footage of players and coaching staff during and away from matches. This tour followed the Lions' 1993 tour to New Zealand and preceded their 2001 tour to Australia.

== Test series ==
The British Lions won the first test at Newlands 25–16 with Neil Jenkins kicking five penalties, and Matt Dawson and Alan Tait scoring tries. Despite scoring three tries in the second test at Durban, the Springboks failed to land any penalties or conversions, while the Lions Neil Jenkins once again kicked five penalties to level the scores at 15–15 before a Jerry Guscott drop goal for an 18–15 lead for the Lions. The Lions then held off a ferocious South African fightback, with Lawrence Dallaglio putting in a try-saving tackle, and won the match 18–15 to take the series. The third test at Ellis Park was won by South Africa, 35–16.

The tour was a triumph for the British Lions management of Fran Cotton (manager), Ian McGeechan (head coach), Jim Telfer (assistant coach) and the captain Martin Johnson. It was the last time the Lions won a test series until their tour of Australia in 2013.

== Lions squad ==
The original 35-man squad was:

Name	Position	Club	Home Nation	Notes
Martin Johnson (c)	Lock	Leicester	England	
Neil Jenkins	Fullback	Pontypridd	Wales	
Tim Stimpson	Fullback	Newcastle	England	
Nick Beal	Wing	Northampton	England	
John Bentley	Wing	Newcastle	England	
Ieuan Evans	Wing	Llanelli	Wales	
Tony Underwood	Wing	Newcastle	England	
Allan Bateman	Centre	Richmond	Wales	
Scott Gibbs	Centre	Swansea	Wales	
Will Greenwood	Centre	Leicester	England	
Jeremy Guscott	Centre	Bath	England	
Alan Tait	Centre	Newcastle	Scotland	
Paul Grayson	Fly-half	Northampton	England	
Gregor Townsend	Fly-half	Northampton	Scotland	
Matt Dawson	Scrum-half	Northampton	England	
Austin Healey	Scrum-half	Leicester	England	
Rob Howley	Scrum-half	Cardiff	Wales	
Paul Wallace	Prop	Saracens	Ireland	Replaced the injured Peter Clohessy before the start of the tour
Jason Leonard	Prop	Harlequins	England	
Graham Rowntree	Prop	Leicester	England	
Tom Smith	Prop	Watsonians	Scotland	
Dai Young	Prop	Cardiff	Wales	
Mark Regan	Hooker	Bristol	England	
Barry Williams	Hooker	Neath	Wales	
Keith Wood	Hooker	Harlequins	Ireland	
Jeremy Davidson	Lock	London Irish	Ireland	
Simon Shaw	Lock	Bristol	England	
Doddie Weir	Lock	Newcastle	Scotland	
Neil Back	Back row	Leicester	England	
Lawrence Dallaglio	Back row	Wasps	England	
Richard Hill	Back row	Saracens	England	
Eric Miller	Back row	Leicester	Ireland	
Scott Quinnell	Back row	Richmond	Wales	
Tim Rodber	Back row	Northampton	England	
Rob Wainwright	Back row	Watsonians	Scotland	
Tony Stanger	Wing	Hawick	Scotland	Later addition to the tour
Mike Catt	Fly-half	Bath	England	Later addition to the tour
Kyran Bracken	Scrum-half	Saracens	England	Later addition to the tour
Tony Diprose	Back row	Saracens	England	Later addition to the tour
Nigel Redman	Lock	Bath	England	Later addition to the tour

== Matches ==
Scores and results list British Lions' points tally first.

Date	Opponent	Venue	Result	Score
24 May	Eastern Province XV	Boet Erasmus Stadium, Port Elizabeth	Won	39–11
28 May	Border	Basil Kenyon Stadium, East London	Won	18–14
31 May	Western Province	Newlands, Cape Town	Won	38–21
4 June	Mpumalanga	Johann van Riebeeck Stadium, Witbank	Won	64–14
7 June	Northern Transvaal	Loftus Versfeld, Pretoria	Lost	30–35
11 June	Gauteng Lions	Ellis Park, Johannesburg	Won	20–14
14 June	Sharks	King's Park, Durban	Won	42–12
17 June	Emerging Springboks	Boland Stadium, Wellington	Won	51–22
21 June	South Africa	Newlands, Cape Town	Won	25–16
24 June	Free State	Free State Stadium, Bloemfontein	Won	52–30
28 June	South Africa	King's Park, Durban	Won	18–15
1 July	Northern Free State	Noord-wes Stadium, Welkom	Won	67–39
5 July	South Africa	Ellis Park, Johannesburg	Lost	16–35

=== First Test ===
21 June 1997

South Africa	16–25	British Lions
Try: Du Randt 23' m Bennett 44' m Pen: Lubbe (1/1) 3'; Honiball (1/1) 50'	Report	Try: Dawson 73' m Tait 79' m Pen: Jenkins (5/6) 6', 33', 35', 43', 62'

Newlands Stadium, Cape Town
Referee: Colin Hawke (New Zealand)

FB	15	André Joubert
RW	14	James Small
OC	13	Japie Mulder
IC	12	Edrich Lubbe	(substituted off) 40'
LW	11	André Snyman
FH	10	Henry Honiball
SH	9	Joost van der Westhuizen
N8	8	Gary Teichmann (c)
OF	7	André Venter
BF	6	Ruben Kruger
RL	5	Mark Andrews
LL	4	Hannes Strydom
TP	3	Adrian Garvey
HK	2	Naka Drotské
LP	1	Os du Randt
Replacements:
FB	16	Russell Bennett	(substituted on) 40'
FB	17	Boeta Wessels
SH	18	Werner Swanepoel
LK	19	Krynauw Otto
HK	20	James Dalton
PR	21	Dawie Theron
Coach:
(South Africa) Carel du Plessis

FB	15	(Wales) Neil Jenkins
RW	14	(Wales) Ieuan Evans
OC	13	(Wales) Scott Gibbs
IC	12	(England) Jeremy Guscott
LW	11	(Scotland) Alan Tait
FH	10	(Scotland) Gregor Townsend
SH	9	(England) Matt Dawson
N8	8	(England) Tim Rodber
OF	7	(England) Richard Hill
BF	6	(England) Lawrence Dallaglio
RL	5	(Ireland) Jeremy Davidson
LL	4	(England) Martin Johnson (c)
TP	3	(Ireland) Paul Wallace
HK	2	(Ireland) Keith Wood
LP	1	(Scotland) Tom Smith	(substituted off) 79'
Replacements:
PR	16	(England) Jason Leonard	(substituted on) 79'
WG	17	(England) John Bentley
CE	18	(England) Mike Catt
SH	19	(England) Austin Healey
HK	20	(Wales) Barry Williams
FL	21	(Scotland) Rob Wainwright
Coach:
(Scotland) Ian McGeechan

=== Second Test ===
28 June 1997

South Africa	15–18	British Lions
Try: Van der Westhuizen; Montgomery; Joubert	Report	Pen: Jenkins (5); Drop: Guscott

Kings Park Stadium, Durban
Attendance: 50,000
Referee: Didier Mene (France)

FB	15	André Joubert
RW	14	André Snyman
OC	13	Percy Montgomery
IC	12	Danie van Schalkwyk
LW	11	Pieter Rossouw
FH	10	Henry Honiball
SH	9	Joost van der Westhuizen
N8	8	Gary Teichmann (c)
OF	7	André Venter
BF	6	Ruben Kruger	(substituted off) 50'
RL	5	Mark Andrews
LL	4	Hannes Strydom
TP	3	Adrian Garvey	(substituted off) 67'
HK	2	Naka Drotské
LP	1	Os du Randt
Replacements:
PR	16	Dawie Theron	(substituted on) 67'
LK	17	Fritz van Heerden	(substituted on) 50'
FB	18	Russell Bennett
FB	19	Boeta Wessels
SH	20	Werner Swanepoel
HK	21	James Dalton
Coach:
(South Africa) Carel du Plessis

FB	15	(Wales) Neil Jenkins
RW	14	(England) John Bentley
OC	13	(Wales) Scott Gibbs
IC	12	(England) Jeremy Guscott
LW	11	(Scotland) Alan Tait	(substituted off) 76'
FH	10	(Scotland) Gregor Townsend
SH	9	(England) Matt Dawson
N8	8	(England) Tim Rodber	(substituted off) 76'
OF	7	(England) Richard Hill	(substituted off) 57'
BF	6	(England) Lawrence Dallaglio
RL	5	(Ireland) Jeremy Davidson
LL	4	(England) Martin Johnson (c)
TP	3	(Ireland) Paul Wallace
HK	2	(Ireland) Keith Wood
LP	1	(Scotland) Tom Smith
Replacements:
SH	16	(England) Austin Healey	(substituted on) 76'
FL	17	(England) Neil Back	(substituted on) 57'
N8	18	(Ireland) Eric Miller	(substituted on) 76'
CE	19	(England) Mike Catt
HK	20	(Wales) Barry Williams
PR	21	(England) Jason Leonard
Coach:
(Scotland) Ian McGeechan

=== Third Test ===
5 July 1997

South Africa	35–16	British Lions
Try: Van der Westhuizen; Montgomery; Snyman; Rossouw; Con: De Beer (2); Honiball; Pen: De Beer (3)	Report	Try: Dawson; Con: Jenkins; Pen: Jenkins(3)

Ellis Park Stadium, Johannesburg
Attendance: 62,000
Referee: Wayne Erickson (Australia)

FB	15	Russell Bennett
RW	14	André Snyman
OC	13	Percy Montgomery	(substituted off) 53'
IC	12	Danie van Schalkwyk
LW	11	Pieter Rossouw
FH	10	Jannie de Beer	(substituted off) 71'
SH	9	Joost van der Westhuizen	(substituted off) 80'
N8	8	Gary Teichmann (c)	(substituted off) 73'
OF	7	Rassie Erasmus
BF	6	André Venter
RL	5	Krynauw Otto
LL	4	Hannes Strydom
TP	3	Dawie Theron
HK	2	James Dalton	(substituted off) 69'
LP	1	Os du Randt	(substituted off) 63'
Replacements:
FH	16	Henry Honiball	(substituted on) 53'
WG	17	Justin Swart	(substituted on) 71'
SH	18	Werner Swanepoel	(substituted on) 80'
PR	19	Adrian Garvey	(substituted on) 63'
HK	20	Naka Drotské	(substituted on) 69'
LK	21	Fritz van Heerden	(substituted on) 73'
Coach:
(South Africa) Carel du Plessis

FB	15	(Wales) Neil Jenkins
RW	14	(England) John Bentley
OC	13	(England) Jeremy Guscott	(substituted off) 40'
IC	12	(Wales) Scott Gibbs
LW	11	(England) Tony Underwood	(substituted off) 30'
FH	10	(England) Mike Catt
SH	9	(England) Matt Dawson	(substituted off) 80'
N8	8	(England) Lawrence Dallaglio
OF	7	(England) Neil Back
BF	6	(Scotland) Rob Wainwright
RL	5	(Ireland) Jeremy Davidson
LL	4	(England) Martin Johnson (c)
TP	3	(Ireland) Paul Wallace
HK	2	(England) Mark Regan
LP	1	(Scotland) Tom Smith
Replacements:
CE	16	(Wales) Allan Bateman	(substituted on) 40'
FB	17	(England) Tim Stimpson	(substituted on) 30'
SH	18	(England) Austin Healey	(substituted on) 80'
FL	19	(England) Richard Hill
HK	20	(Wales) Barry Williams
PR	21	(Wales) Dai Young
Coach:
(Scotland) Ian McGeechan
