= 1994 Argentina rugby union tour of South Africa =

Summary
P	W	D	L
Total
6	3	0	3
Test match
2	0	0	2
Opponent
P	W	D	L
South Africa
2	0	0	2

The 1994 Argentina rugby union tour of South Africa was a series of eight matches played by the Argentina national rugby union team in September and October, in South Africa. South Africa won both international matches.

== Matches ==
27 September 1994

SA Development XV	21 - 51	Argentina XV

Wellington

30 September 1994

Border	25 - 41	Argentina XV

East London

4 October 1994

South Africa A	56 - 12	Argentina XV

Brakpan

8 October 1994

South Africa	42 - 22	Argentina
Try: Strauss, Williams; Roux 2, Stransky, Con: Stransky 4 Pen: Stransky 3		Try: Loffreda, Pfister; Teran; Con: del Castillo 2 Pen: del Castillo

Boet Erasmus, Port Elizabeth
Attendance: 28.000
Referee: Glenn Wahlstrom ( (New Zealand) NZRU)

South Africa			Argentina
Gavin Johnson	FB	15	FB	Sebastian Salvat
James Small	W	14	W	Martín Terán
Christiaan Scholtz	C	13	C	Marcelo Loffreda (capt.)
Brendan Venter	C	12	C	Diego Cuesta Silva
Chester Williams	W	11	W	Martin Pfister
Joel Stransky	FH	10	FH	Guillermo del Castillo
Johan Roux	SH	9	SH	Rafael Bullrich
Tiaan Strauss	N8	8	N8	Guillermo Ugartemendia
Rudolf Straeuli	F	7	F	Cristian Viel Temperley
(capt.) Francois Pienaar	F	6	F	Rolando Martín
Drikus Hattingh	L	5	L	Germán Llanes
Mark Andrews	L	4	L	Pedro Sporleder
Tommy Laubscher	P	3	P	Patricio Noriega
Uli Schmidt	H	2	H	Federico Méndez
Os du Randt	P	1	P	Matias Corral
		Replacements
James Dalton	H	16	C	Francisco Garcia

11 October 1994

Northern Free State	27 - 64	Argentina XV

Welkom

15 October 1994

South Africa	46 - 26	Argentina
Try: Andrews, Badenhorst 2 Straeuli, Stransky van der Westhuizen, Williams		Try: Cilley, Llanes; Con: Cilley 2 Pen: Cilley 4

Ellis Park, Johannesburg
Attendance: 40.000
Referee: Glenn Wahlstrom ( (New Zealand) - NZRU)

South Africa			Argentina
Andre Joubert	FB	15	FB	Sebastian Salvat
Chris Badenhorst	W	14	W	Martín Terán
Hennie le Roux	C	13	C	Francisco Garcia
Brendan Venter	C	12	C	Marcelo Loffreda (capt.)
Chester Williams	W	11	W	Martin Pfister
Joel Stransky	FH	10	FH	Jose Cilley
Joost van der Westhuizen	SH	9	SH	Rafael Bullrich
Tiaan Strauss	N8	8	N8	Guillermo Ugartemendia
Rudolf Straeuli	F	7	F	Cristian Viel
(capt.) Francois Pienaar	F	6	F	Rolando Martín
Drikus Hattingh	L	5	L	Pedro Sporleder
Mark Andrews	L	4	L	Germán Llanes
Tommy Laubscher	P	3	P	Patricio Noriega
Uli Schmidt	H	2	H	Federico Méndez
Os du Randt	P	1	P	Matias Corral
		Replacements
Elandre van den Bergh	F	16
Balie Swart	P	17

== Team ==
Player	Match Played	Score				Total points
Player	Match Played	tries	conv.	pen.	drop	Total points
Christian Barrea (Córdoba AC - Córdoba - Half-Back)	2					0
Nicolás Bossicovich (Gymnasia y Esgrima Rosario - Rosario - Forward)	2	1				5
Leandro Bouza (Duendes - Rosario - Three-Quarter)	1		4	1		11
Rafael Bullrich (Club Newman - Buenos Aires - Half-Back)	5	1				5
Gonzalo Camardón (Alumni - Buenos Aires - Half-Back)	3	3				15
Jose Cilley (San Isidro Club - Buenos Aires - Half-Back)	1	1	2	4		21
Matias Corral (San Isidro Club - Buenos Aires - Forward)	5	2				10
Diego Cuesta Silva (San Isidro Club - Buenos Aires - Three-Quarter)	3					0
Fernando del Castillo (Jockey Club Rosario - Rosario - Three-Quarter)	2					0
Guillermo del Castillo (Jockey Club Rosario - Rosario - Half-Back)	3		9	6		36
Francisco Garcia (Alumni - Buenos Aires - Three-Quarter)	5		1	4		14
Roberto Grau (Liceo Mendoza RC - Cuyo - Forward)	1					0
Martin Grotte (Hindú Club - Buenos Aires - Forward)	1					0
Sebastián Irazoqui (Club Palermo Bajo - Córdoba - Forward)	3					0
Germán Llanes (La Plata - Buenos Aires - Forward)	6	1				5
Marcelo Loffreda (San Isidro Club - Buenos Aires - Three-Quarter)	4	2	2			14
Rolando Martín (San Isidro Club - Buenos Aires - Forward)	6	3				15
Federico Mendez (Mendoza RC - Cuyo - Forward)	5	1				5
Patricio Noriega (Hindú Club - Buenos Aires - Forward)	6	1				5
Martin Pfister (Tucuman RC - Tucumán - Three-Quarter)	4	3				15
Carlos Promancio (Duendes - Rosario - Forward)	1					0
Sebastian Salvat (Alumni - Buenos Aires - Full Back)	5	1				5
Pedro Sporleder (Curupaytí - Buenos Aires - Forward)	4					0
Martín Terán (Tucuman RC - Tucumán - Three-Quarter)	6	3				15
Guillermo Ugartemendía (Los Matreros Rugby Club - Buenos Aires - Forward)	5	1				5
Cristián Viel (Club Newman - Buenos Aires - Forward)	4					0
Martin Viola (Jockey Club Cordoba - Córdoba - Forward)	1					0

== Sources ==
- Union Argentina de Rugby (December 1994). "MEMORIA Temporada año 1994" (PDF) (in Spanish). Archived from the original (.pdf) on 12 May 2013.
- Stephen Jones, ed. (1995). Rothmans Rugby Union Yearbook 1995-96. Headline. ISBN 0-7472-7816-4.
