= André Venter =

South African rugby union player

- Born: André Gerhardus Venter; 14 November 1970 (age 55) Vereeniging, South Africa
- Height: 1.95 m (6 ft 5 in)
- Weight: 109 kg (17 st 2 lb)
- School: Hoërskool Kroonstad
- Notable relative: Andre-Hugo Venter (son)

Rugby union career
- Position: Flanker
Senior career
Years	Team	Apps	(Points)
1991–2002	Free State Cheetahs	115	(135)
1998–2001	Cats	46	(60)
International career
Years	Team	Apps	(Points)
1996–2001	South Africa	66	(45)
- Correct as of 11 October 2012

André Gerhardus Venter (born 14 November 1970 in Vereeniging, South Africa) is a former South African rugby union footballer who earned 66 caps playing for the South Africa national team during the mid-to-late 1990s and early 2000s. He represented South Africa during the 1999 Rugby World Cup where they finished third.

A few years after his retirement he was diagnosed with a degenerative syndrome of the central nervous system, later revealed to be transverse myelitis, which causes damage to the spine, and forced him into a wheelchair. Later, his former Springbok teammate, Joost van der Westhuizen developed a degenerative nervous disease, amyotrophic lateral sclerosis.

== International statistics ==
=== Test Match Record ===
Against	P	W	D	L	Tri	Pts	%Won
Argentina	3	3	0	0	2	10	100
Australia	11	4	1	6	0	0	40.91
British Lions	3	1	0	2	0	0	33.33
Canada	1	1	0	0	0	0	100
England	8	4	0	4	0	0	50
France	6	4	0	2	0	0	66.67
Ireland	4	4	0	0	1	5	100
Italy	5	5	0	0	1	5	100
New Zealand	14	5	0	9	0	0	35.71
Scotland	3	3	0	0	2	10	100
Tonga	1	1	0	0	0	0	100
United States	1	1	0	0	0	0	100
Uruguay	1	1	0	0	0	0	100
Wales	5	4	0	1	3	15	80
Total	66	41	1	24	9	45	62.88

Pld = Games Played, W = Games Won, D = Games Drawn, L = Games Lost, Tri = Tries Scored, Pts = Points Scored

=== Test tries (9) ===
Tries	Opposition	Location	Venue	Competition	Date	Result
1	Argentina	Buenos Aires, Argentina	Ferro Carril Oeste Stadium	Test match	9 Nov 1996	Won 46–15
1	Argentina	Buenos Aires, Argentina	Ferro Carril Oeste Stadium	Test match	16 Nov 1996	Won 44–21
1	Scotland	Edinburgh, Scotland	Murrayfield	Test match	6 Dec 1997	Won 68–10
2	Wales	Pretoria, South Africa	Loftus Versfeld	Test match	27 Jun 1998	Won 96–13
1	Wales	London, England	Wembley	Test match	14 Nov 1998	Won 28–20
1	Scotland	Edinburgh, Scotland	Murrayfield	World Cup	3 Oct 1999	Won 46–29
1	Ireland	Dublin, Ireland	Lansdowne Road	Test match	19 Nov 2000	Won 28–18
1	Italy	Port Elizabeth, South Africa	Boet Erasmus Stadium	Test match	30 Jun 2001	Won 60–14

=== World Cup matches ===
Champions Runners-up Third place Fourth place

No.	Date	Opposition	Venue	Stage	Position	Tries	Result
1999
1.	3 Oct 1999	Scotland	Murrayfield, Edinburgh	Pool match	Flank	1	46–29
2.	15 Oct 1999	Uruguay	Hampden Park, Glasgow	Pool match	Flank		39–3
3.	24 Oct 1999	England	Stade de France, Paris	Quarter-final	Flank		44–21
4.	30 Oct 1999	Australia	Twickenham, London	Semi-final	Flank		21–27
5.	4 Nov 1999	New Zealand	Millennium Stadium, Cardiff	Third place play-off	Flank		22–18

== See also ==
- List of South Africa national rugby union players – Springbok no. 634
