= Irazoqui =

Irazoqui is a surname. Notable people with the surname include:

- Enrique Irazoqui (1944–2020), Spanish actor
- Sebastián Irazoqui (born 1969), Argentine rugby union player
