= Hannes Strydom =

South African rugby union footballer (1965–2023)

- Born: Johannes Jacobus Strydom; 13 July 1965 Welkom, Orange Free State, South Africa
- Died: 19 November 2023 (aged 58) Mpumalanga, South Africa
- Height: 1.99 m (6 ft 6 in)
- Weight: 115 kg (254 lb)
- School: Pearson High School, Port Elizabeth
- University: University of Port Elizabeth; University of Pretoria

Rugby union career
- Position: Lock
Provincial / State sides
Years	Team	Apps	(Points)
1986–1988	Eastern Province	35	
1989–1992	Northern Transvaal	23	
1993–2000	Transvaal /Golden Lions	115	
Super Rugby
Years	Team	Apps	(Points)
1998–1999	Cats		
International career
Years	Team	Apps	(Points)
1993–1997	South Africa	21	(5)

Johannes Jacobus Strydom (13 July 1965 – 19 November 2023) was a South African rugby union player who played as a lock. He earned 21 caps for the South Africa national rugby union team between 1993 and 1997.

Strydom represented the Springboks for a total of 21 tests and 10 non-tests. He was also a member of the 1995 world cup winning team that won the finals defeating New Zealand.

== Early life ==
Strydom was born on 13 July 1965 in Welkom, in the Free State province of South Africa.

== Career ==
=== Provincial ===
Strydom represented the Eastern Province Schools team at the 1983 and 1984 Craven Week tournaments. In 1986, he made his senior provincial debut for Eastern Province. He also represented Northern Transvaal and from 1993, Transvaal that later became the Golden Lions, where he formed a formidable combination with Kobus Wiese.

In Super Rugby, he represented the Gauteng Lions and with the establishment of the South African franchise system in 1998, the Cats.

=== International ===
Strydom played his first test match for the Springboks on 3 July 1993 against France at Ellis Park. He toured with the Springboks to Australia and Argentina in 1993, playing in all the test matches during the tours. In 1994 he played only one test match and in 1995 was a member of the World Cup squad and also played in the World Cup final. Strydom was a member of the 1995 Springboks team that won the world cup that year defeating New Zealand. The famous tournament win was made into the Hollywood film, Invictus, in 2009.

He continued to represent South Africa during the 1996 and 1997 seasons, including the test series against the 1997 British Lions. Strydom also played in nine tour matches. In a career spanning 1993 through 1997, he made a total of 21 appearances for the country.

=== World Cup ===
- 1995 World Cup in South Africa : 4 games (Australia, Canada, France, New Zealand).

=== Post-playing Career ===
After his retirement, Strydom went on to become a businessman, owning the 'Pharma Valu' chain of pharmacies based in Pretoria.

== Accolades ==
In 2003, he was inducted into the University of Pretoria Sports Hall of Fame.

== Personal life and death ==
He went to school at Pearson High School in Port Elizabeth and the A rugby field is named after him. He worked as a pharmacist in Pretoria.

Hannes Strydom died in a traffic collision near EMalahleni, a town in the Mpumalanga province, on 19 November 2023, at the age of 58. He was the fifth player from the 1995 world-cup-winning side to die, after Ruben Kruger, Joost van der Westhuizen, James Small and Chester Williams.

== See also ==
- List of South Africa national rugby union players – Springbok no. 586
