= 1995 Rugby World Cup final =

Rugby union match in South Africa

1995 Rugby World Cup Final
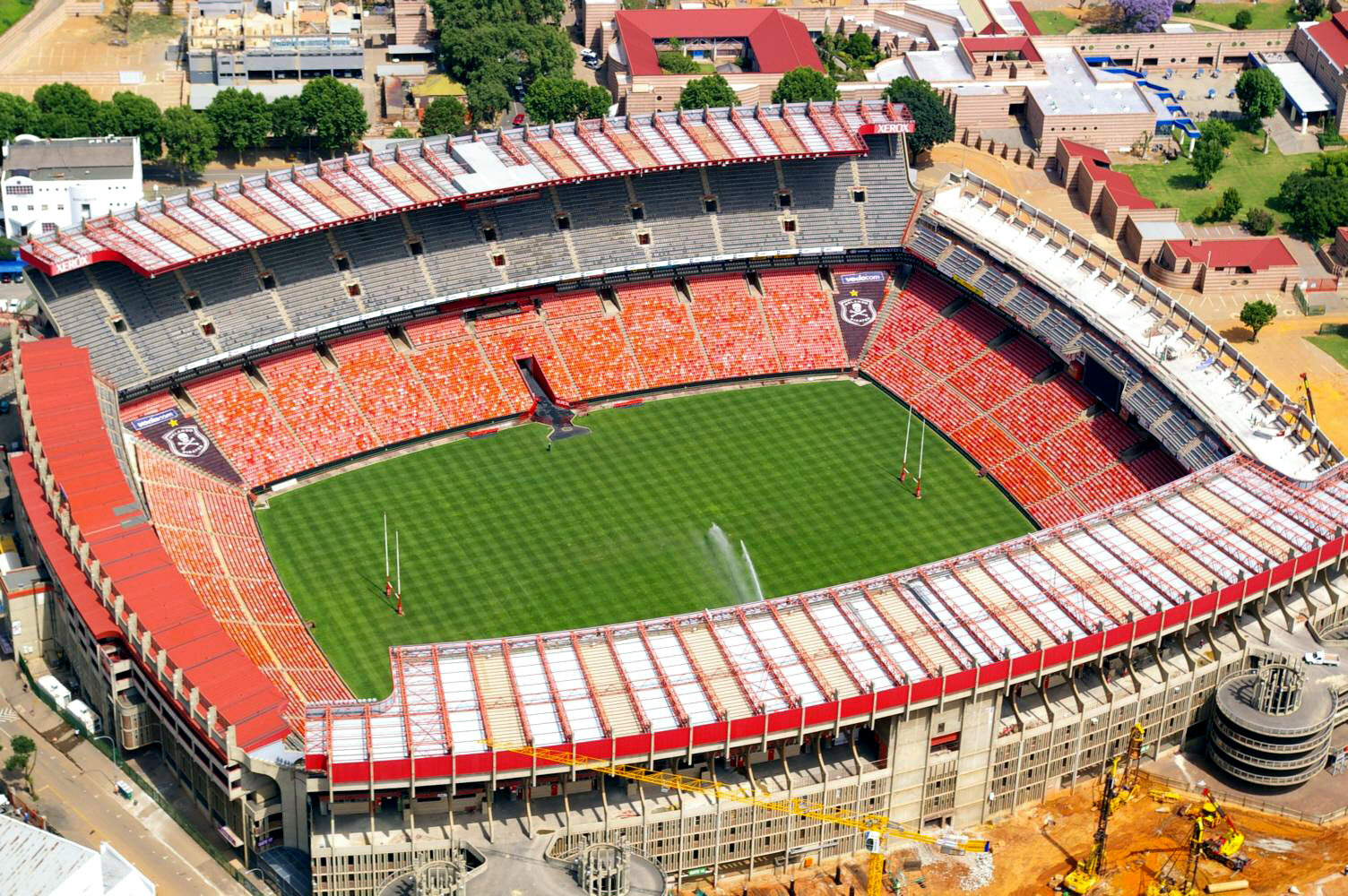
- Event: 1995 Rugby World Cup
South Africa	New Zealand
15	12
- After extra time
- Date: 24 June 1995
- Venue: Ellis Park Stadium, Johannesburg
- Referee: Ed Morrison (England)
- Attendance: 59,870

The 1995 Rugby World Cup Final was the final match of the 1995 Rugby World Cup, played in South Africa. The match was played at Ellis Park Stadium, Johannesburg on 24 June 1995 between the host nation, South Africa, and New Zealand.

South Africa won the match by three points in their first Rugby World Cup Final, which was also the first to require extra time. Unusually, the points were scored by only one player from each team, with Andrew Mehrtens of New Zealand scoring all 12 of the All Blacks points, (three penalties and one drop goal) and Joel Stransky tallying all 15 points (three penalties and two drop goals) for the Springboks, including a drop goal in extra time, which sealed the victory and their first ever Rugby World Cup title.

At the end of the match, South African President Nelson Mandela, wearing a number 6 Springbok rugby shirt and cap, presented the Webb Ellis Cup to the South African captain François Pienaar.

== Path to the final ==
The final was contested by the hosts, South Africa, and New Zealand. Both teams finished at the top of their pools, both undefeated in the pool stages. South Africa defeated Western Samoa in the quarter finals, and then France in the semi-finals to reach the final; the All Blacks defeated Scotland in the quarter-finals, and England in the semi-finals, a game in which Jonah Lomu famously scored four tries.

Going into the final, New Zealand had led the tournament in points scored, outscoring their opponents 315–104, while South Africa had outscored their opponents 129–55. The high scoring All Blacks had been led by Lomu, who had the record for most tries in a world cup match summary.

== The Final ==
=== Queen of the Skies fly by ===
Just minutes before South Africa and New Zealand ran out for the final, a Boeing 747-200 ZS-SAN, nicknamed "LEBOMBO" captained by Captain Laurie Kay approached the ground from the south. They completed the first fly by, made a right turn and approached for a second even lower fly by. The message "GOOD LUCK BOKKE" was stenciled beneath her wings and was witnessed by the full capacity of Ellis Park.

=== Anthems ===
The national anthem of New Zealand, "God Defend New Zealand", and the then-dual national anthems of South Africa's "Die Stem van Suid-Afrika" and "Nkosi Sikelel' iAfrika" were sung by the Imilonji Kantu Choral Society.

=== First half ===
No tries were scored, but this did not diminish the tense atmosphere and climactic finish. The South Africans played a largely defensive game. Due to the strength of flanker Ruben Kruger and No. 8 Mark Andrews plus scrum-half Joost van der Westhuizen, the expansive attacks from New Zealand were repeatedly closed down. Andrew Mehrtens opened the scoring with a penalty after six minutes to give New Zealand a 3–0 lead. A Joel Stransky penalty put South Africa on the scoreboard after 11 minutes. Mehrtens and Stransky swapped successful penalty kicks. Following a period of pressure, Stransky landed a 32nd minute drop goal to give South Africa a 9–6 lead at half time.

=== Second half ===
The All Blacks levelled the scores at 9–9 with a Mehrtens drop goal after 55 minutes. Though All Blacks fly-half Andrew Mehrtens almost kicked a late drop goal, the score remained unchanged at full time, forcing the game into extra time for the first time in a Rugby World Cup final.

=== Extra time ===
Extra time began with South Africa needing to take the initiative, due to the ruling that if extra time finished with scores still level with no side having scored more tries than the other, then the team with the better overall disciplinary record during the tournament would win. But early in the first half, the Springboks were penalized for chasing a Stransky kick from an offside position. From just inside the half-way line, Mehrtens kicked truly to give New Zealand a 12–9 lead. As half-time approached, Stransky put a high kick for his teammates to chase, and from the resultant play referee Morrison penalized the All Blacks for diving to the ground near the tackle, and right on the stroke of half-time Stransky levelled the scores at 12–12. Seven minutes from time it was Stransky who scored the final point. From thirty metres out he struck the drop goal, securing South Africa's victory and the Rugby World Cup crown.

== Aftermath ==
After the match Nelson Mandela, wearing a Springbok rugby shirt and cricket cap, presented the Webb Ellis Cup to South Africa captain François Pienaar. The moment is one of the most famous of any sporting final. In 2002, Mandela's presentation was listed at number 70 in a list of the 100 Greatest Sporting Moments on a British television programme.

During the end of tournament banquet, South Africa's rugby president, Louis Luyt said in his speech that "There were no true world champions in the 1987 and 1991 World Cups because South Africa were not there." This claim led the New Zealand team to walk out of the dinner.

== Match details ==
24 June 1995
13:30 UTC+2

South Africa	15–12	New Zealand
Pen: Stransky (3/4) 10', 22', 90'; Drop: Stransky (2/2) 31', 92'	Report	Pen: Mehrtens (3/3) 5', 13', 83'; Drop: Mehrtens (1/2) 55'

Ellis Park, Johannesburg
Attendance: 65,000
Referee: Ed Morrison (England)

South Africa	New Zealand

FB	15	André Joubert
RW	14	James Small	(substituted off) 97'
OC	13	Japie Mulder
IC	12	Hennie le Roux
LW	11	Chester Williams
FH	10	Joel Stransky
SH	9	Joost van der Westhuizen
N8	8	Mark Andrews	(substituted off) 90'
BF	7	Ruben Kruger
OF	6	Francois Pienaar (c)
RL	5	Hannes Strydom
LL	4	Kobus Wiese
TP	3	Balie Swart	(substituted off) 68'
HK	2	Chris Rossouw
LP	1	Os du Randt
Replacements:
HK	16	Naka Drotské
C	17	Brendan Venter	(substituted on) 97'
FL	18	Rudolf Straeuli	(substituted on) 90'
SH	19	Johan Roux
PR	20	Garry Pagel	(substituted on) 68'
FB	21	Gavin Johnson
Coach:
(South Africa) Kitch Christie

FB	15	Glen Osborne
RW	14	Jeff Wilson	(substituted off) 55'
OC	13	Frank Bunce
IC	12	Walter Little
LW	11	Jonah Lomu
FH	10	Andrew Mehrtens
SH	9	Graeme Bachop	67' to 70'
N8	8	Zinzan Brooke
OF	7	Josh Kronfeld
BF	6	Mike Brewer	(substituted off) 40'
RL	5	Robin Brooke
LL	4	Ian Jones
TP	3	Olo Brown
HK	2	Sean Fitzpatrick (c)
LP	1	Craig Dowd	(substituted off) 83'
Replacements:
WG	16	Marc Ellis	(substituted on) 55'
FH	17	Simon Culhane
SH	18	Ant Strachan	(substituted on) 67'	(substituted off) 70'
FL	19	Jamie Joseph	(substituted on) 40'
PR	20	Richard Loe	(substituted on) 83'
HK	21	Norm Hewitt
Coach:
(New Zealand) Laurie Mains

Referee:
Ed Morrison (England)

Touch Judges:
Derek Bevan (Wales)
Joël Dumé (France)

== In popular culture ==
Mandela and Pienaar's involvement in the 1995 World Cup became the subject of Clint Eastwood's Oscar-nominated 2009 film Invictus, featuring Morgan Freeman as Mandela and Matt Damon as Pienaar, with the final as the climactic scene and filmed on location at Ellis Park. Chester Williams, the only black player in the 1995 Springbok squad, was a technical consultant.

== Poisoning allegations ==
New Zealand coach Laurie Mains and doctor Mike Bowen have claimed that the All Blacks were intentionally food poisoned while staying at a South African hotel. The South African side has rebuffed these claims and New Zealand manager Colin Meads has attributed the poisoning to "dodgy milk" rather than an intentional act.

== See also ==
- List of Rugby World Cup finals
