= Mark Andrews (rugby union) =

South African rugby union player

- Born: 21 February 1972 (age 54) Elliot, Eastern Cape, South Africa
- Height: 6 ft 7 in (2.01 m)
- Weight: 256 lb (116 kg)
- School: Selborne College, South Africa
- University: University of Natal, Pietermaritzburg

Rugby union career
- Position(s): Lock, Number 8
Amateur team(s)
Years	Team	Apps	(Points)
1993	Natal University		
Senior career
Years	Team	Apps	(Points)
2003–2004	Newcastle Falcons	15	
Provincial / State sides
Years	Team	Apps	(Points)
1993–2002	Sharks (Currie Cup)	122	(40)
Super Rugby
Years	Team	Apps	(Points)
1996–2002	Sharks	40	(15)
International career
Years	Team	Apps	(Points)
1994–2002	South Africa	77	(60)
Medal record
Men's rugby union
Representing South Africa
Rugby World Cup
Gold medal – first place	1995 South Africa	Squad

Mark Gregory Andrews (born 21 February 1972) is a former South African rugby union player.

== Career ==
He achieved his Junior Springbok colours in waterpolo while still at school. He switched to rugby union as his main sport and achieved honours while at school and was selected for the Border schools team to play at the 1990 Craven Week tournament. While at university he was selected for the SA Student team in 1993 and the SA Universities team in 1994. He played for Natal's winning Currie Cup team in 1995 and 1996.

Andrews made his international test debut for South Africa on 11 June 1994 against England in Cape Town. He went on to play 77 test and 13 mid-week games for South Africa. Andrews formed a formidable lock combination with Kobus Wiese and later Krynauw Otto. During his test career he scored 12 tries for a tally of 60 test points.

He was part of the 1995 Rugby World Cup winning team alongside another native of Elliot, prop Os du Randt.

== International statistics ==
=== Test match record ===
Against	P	W	D	L	Tri	Pts	% won
Argentina	5	5	0	0	3	15	100
Australia	13	7	1	5	3	15	57.69
British Lions	2	0	0	2	0	0	0
England	8	5	0	3	1	5	62.5
Fiji	1	1	0	0	1	5	100
France	8	6	0	2	0	0	75
Ireland	4	4	0	0	1	5	100
Italy	3	3	0	0	1	5	100
New Zealand	19	6	1	12	0	0	34.21
Samoa	2	2	0	0	2	10	100
Scotland	4	4	0	0	0	0	100
Tonga	1	1	0	0	0	0	100
Uruguay	1	1	0	0	0	0	100
Wales	6	6	0	0	0	0	100
Total	77	51	2	24	12	60	67.53

Pld = Games played, W = Games won, D = Games drawn, L = Games lost, Tri = Tries scored, Pts = Points scored

=== Test tries (12) ===
Tries	Opposition	Location	Venue	Competition	Date	Result
1	Argentina	Johannesburg, South Africa	Ellis Park	Test match	15 Oct 1994	Won 46–26
1	Samoa	Johannesburg, South Africa	Ellis Park	Test match	13 Apr 1995	Won 60–8
1	Samoa	Johannesburg, South Africa	Ellis Park	1995 World Cup	10 Jun 1995	Won 42–14
1	Fiji	Pretoria, South Africa	Loftus Versfeld	Test match	2 Jul 1996	Won 43–18
1	Argentina	Buenos Aires, Argentina	Ferro Carril Oeste Stadium	Test match	9 Nov 1996	Won 46–15
1	Australia	Brisbane, Australia	Suncorp Stadium	1997 Tri Nations	2 Aug 1997	Lost 20–32
1	Australia	Pretoria, South Africa	Loftus Versfeld	1997 Tri Nations	23 Aug 1997	Won 61–22
1	England	London, England	Twickenham	Test match	29 Nov 1997	Won 29–11
1	Ireland	Bloemfontein, South Africa	Free State Stadium	Test match	13 Jun 1998	Won 37–13
1	Argentina	Buenos Aires, Argentina	River Plate Stadium	Test match	12 Nov 2000	Won 37–33
1	Italy	Port Elizabeth, South Africa	Boet Erasmus Stadium	Test match	30 Jun 2001	Won 60–14
1	Australia	Perth, Australia	Subiaco Oval	2001 Tri Nations	18 Aug 2001	Draw 14–14

=== World Cup matches ===
Champions Runners-up Third place Fourth place

No.	Date	Opposition	Venue	Stage	Position	Tries	Points	Result
1995
1.	25 May 1995	Australia	Newlands, Cape Town	Pool match	Lock			27–18
2.	10 Jun 1995	Samoa	Ellis Park, Johannesburg	Quarter-final	Lock	1	5	42–14
3.	17 Jun 1995	France	Kings Park, Durban	Semi-final	Number 8			19–15
4.	24 Jun 1995	New Zealand	Ellis Park, Johannesburg	Final	Number 8			15–12
1999
5.	3 Oct 1999	Scotland	Murrayfield, Edinburgh	Pool match	Lock			46–29
6.	15 Oct 1999	Uruguay	Hampden Park, Glasgow	Pool match	Lock			39–3
7.	24 Oct 1999	England	Stade de France, Paris	Quarter-final	Lock			44–21
8.	30 Oct 1999	Australia	Twickenham, London	Semi-final	Lock			21–27
9.	4 Nov 1999	New Zealand	Millennium Stadium, Cardiff	Third place play-off	Lock			22–18

== See also ==
- List of South Africa national rugby union players – Springbok no. 602
