= Barry Williams (rugby union) =

British Lions & Wales international rugby union footballer

- Born: Barry Hugh Williams; 6 January 1974 (age 52) Carmarthen, Wales
- Height: 5 ft 11 in (1.80 m)
- Weight: 16 st 8 lb (105 kg)

Rugby union career
- Position: Hooker
- Current team: Ospreys
Senior career
Years	Team	Apps	(Points)
- Llandovery RFC
- Llanelli RFC
____ - 97	Neath RFC		
1997 - 99	Richmond RFC		
1999 - 01	Bristol		
2001 - __	Neath RFC		
____ - 03	Swansea		
2003-2008	Ospreys	101	(40)
International career
Years	Team	Apps	(Points)
- Wales A
1996 - 2002	Wales	24	(25)
1997	British Lions		

Barry Hugh Williams (born 6 January 1974 in Carmarthen, Carmarthenshire) is a Welsh international rugby union player. He played hooker. In 1997, he toured South Africa with the British & Irish Lions and at the time played club rugby for Neath RFC.

He has previously played for Llandovery RFC, Llanelli RFC, Neath RFC, Richmond RFC, Bristol, Swansea and the Ospreys. He is the current coach of Llandeilo RFC. It has been announced that he will be Head Coach at Llangennech RFC for the 2010/11 season.
