= Invictus (film) =

2009 biographical sports drama film

- Theatrical release poster
- Directed by: Clint Eastwood
- Screenplay by: Anthony Peckham
- Based on: Playing the Enemy: Nelson Mandela and the Game that Made a Nation; 2008 book by John Carlin
- Produced by: Clint Eastwood; Lori McCreary; Robert Lorenz; Mace Neufeld
- Starring: Morgan Freeman; Matt Damon
- Cinematography: Tom Stern
- Edited by: Joel Cox; Gary D. Roach
- Music by: Kyle Eastwood; Michael Stevens
- Production companies: Spyglass Entertainment; Revelations Entertainment; Mace Neufeld Productions; Malpaso Productions; Liberty Pictures
- Distributed by: Warner Bros. Pictures (Worldwide); Times Media Films (now Empire Entertainment, South Africa)
- Release date: 11 December 2009
- Running time: 133 minutes
- Countries: United States; South Africa
- Language: English
- Budget: $50–60 million
- Box office: $122.2 million

Invictus is a 2009 docudrama sports film directed by Clint Eastwood and starring Morgan Freeman and Matt Damon. It is the third collaboration between Eastwood and Freeman after Unforgiven (1992) and Million Dollar Baby (2004), and the first between Eastwood and Damon, followed by Hereafter (2010). The story is based on the 2008 John Carlin book Playing the Enemy: Nelson Mandela and the Game That Made a Nation about the events in South Africa before and during the 1995 Rugby World Cup. The national team, the Springboks, were not expected to perform well, the team having only recently returned to high-level international competition following the dismantling of apartheid—the country was hosting the World Cup, thus earning an automatic entry. Freeman portrays South African President Nelson Mandela while Damon played Francois Pienaar, the captain of the Springboks, the South African rugby union team.

Invictus was released in the United States on 11 December 2009. The film is named after a poem of the same name by British poet William Ernest Henley, which serves as a central plot element in the film. The film was met with positive critical reviews and earned Academy Award nominations for Freeman (Best Actor) and Damon (Best Supporting Actor). The film grossed $122.2 million on a budget of $50–60 million.

== Plot ==
On 11 February 1990, Nelson Mandela is released from Victor Verster Prison after 27 years in captivity. Four years later, he is elected President of South Africa at a time of enormous challenges in the post-apartheid era, including rampant poverty and crime, with Mandela particularly concerned about racial divisions between black and white South Africans. Within his own party, significant cultural changes replacing those of the National Party rule, such as changing the national flag, national anthem and iconography are very popular, but he is also aware that these changes will alienate white South Africans, who still control the country's economy, the police and the military. Mandela attempts to foster better relations beginning with his own security detail, employing established white officers previously employed by previous Presidents and the ANC security officers, though the two share a mutual distrust.

While attending a rugby union match between South Africa and England, Mandela sees that some black South Africans are supporting England rather than the mostly-white Springboks due to the legacy of apartheid; he remarks that he did the same while imprisoned on Robben Island. Knowing that South Africa is set to host the 1995 Rugby World Cup in one year's time, Mandela persuades the newly black-dominated South African Sports Committee to support the Springboks. He meets with the captain of the Springboks, Francois Pienaar, implying that victory for South Africa in the World Cup will unite and inspire the nation. Mandela also recites to Pienaar William Ernest Henley's poem "Invictus" that inspired him during his time in prison.

During the Springboks' preparations many South Africans, black and white, doubt that rugby union will unite a nation torn apart by 46 years of apartheid, especially considering the image of the Springboks to many in the black community. Both Mandela and Pienaar, however, stand firm in their belief that the game can successfully unite South Africans. After the players begin interacting with the majority black fans at the request of Mandela, during the preparation matches support for the Springboks begins to grow among the black population. Mandela's security team also grows closer as the racially diverse officers come to respect their comrades' professionalism and dedication, in addition to bonding over the game of rugby union, a sport which previously appealed primarily to the white team members while being disdained by their black counterparts.

The Springboks defeat their arch-rival and defending champions Australia in their opening match. They then continue to defy all expectations and, as Mandela conducts trade negotiations in Taiwan, they defeat France in heavy rain to advance to the final against their other rival New Zealand - regarded as the tournament favourite and best team in the world. Meanwhile, during the tournament, the Springboks visit Robben Island, where Mandela had served time; seeing Mandela's cell inspires Pienaar to adopt his idea of self-mastery.

A large home crowd of all races gathers at Ellis Park Stadium in Johannesburg for the final, with Mandela in attendance wearing a replica Springboks jersey. Mandela's security detail are alarmed when a South African Airways Boeing 747-200 jetliner flies in low over the stadium - only for the whole crowd to see the message "Good Luck, Bokke" stenciled on the undersides of the plane's wings. The hard-fought final goes into extra time, where fly-half Joel Stransky makes a drop goal to complete the Springboks' run to becoming world champions. Mandela celebrates the victory with the team on the field and hands Pienaar the Webb Ellis Cup. As he is driven back from the match, Mandela feels hope and prosperity for South Africa as he sees the people celebrating together in the streets.

== Cast ==
- Morgan Freeman as Nelson Mandela, the head of the African National Congress (ANC), who has become the first black President of South Africa
- Matt Damon as Francois Pienaar, the Springboks' captain and openside flanker
- Tony Kgoroge as Jason Tshabalala
- Adjoa Andoh as Brenda Mazibuko
- Julian Lewis Jones as Etienne Feyder
- Patrick Mofokeng as Linga Moonsamy
- Matt Stern as Hendrick Booyens
- Marguerite Wheatley as Nerine Winter, Pienaar's wife
- Patrick Lyster as Francois Pienaar's father
- Leleti Khumalo as Mary
- McNeil Hendricks as Chester Williams, the Springboks' left wing and the only non-white player on the team
- Scott Eastwood as Joel Stransky, the Springboks' fly half and goal kicker
- Zak Fe'aunati as Jonah Lomu, the All Blacks' left wing, considered the best player in the world in 1995
- Grant L. Roberts as Ruben Kruger, the Springboks' blindside flanker
- Rolf E. Fitschen as Naka Drotské, the Springboks' reserve hooker
- Vaughn Thompson as Rudolf Straeuli, the Springboks' reserve flanker
- Robin B. Smith as Johan de Villiers, sport commentator
- Charl Engelbrecht as Garry Pagel, the Springboks' reserve prop
- Graham Lindemann as Kobus Wiese, the Springboks' number 4 lock
- Louis Minnaar as Springbok coach
- Sean Cameron Michael as Springbok equipment manager
- Danny Keogh as Louis Luyt
- Bonnie Henna as Zindzi Mandela-Hlongwane
- Kgosi Mongake as Sipho
- David Dukas as the pilot of the Boeing 747 who flew low over Ellis Park Stadium just prior to the appearance of Mandela on the field before the game started
- Hennie Bosman as a high school coach

== Production ==
The film is based on the book Playing the Enemy: Mandela and the Game that Made a Nation by John Carlin. The filmmakers met with Carlin for a week in his Barcelona home, discussing how to transform the book into a screenplay. Filming began in March 2009 in Cape Town. Primary filming in South Africa was completed in May 2009.

Morgan Freeman was the first actor to be cast, as Mandela. Matt Damon was then cast as team captain Francois Pienaar, despite being significantly smaller than him and much smaller than members of the current Springbok squad. He was given intensive coaching by Chester Williams, another star of the 1995 team, at the Gardens Rugby League Club. "In terms of stature and stars, this certainly is one of the biggest films ever to be made in South Africa", said Laurence Mitchell, the head of the Cape Film Commission. On 18 March 2009, Scott Eastwood was cast as flyhalf Joel Stransky (whose drop goal provided the Springboks' winning margin in the 1995 final). Over Christmas 2008, auditions had taken place in London to try to find a well-known British actor to play Pienaar's father, but in March it was decided to cast a lesser-known South African actor instead. Zak Fe'aunati, who had previously played professionally for Bath, was cast as Jonah Lomu, while Grant L. Roberts was cast as Ruben Kruger, who was the Springboks' other starting flanker in 1995. Chester Williams was also involved with the project to teach rugby union to those of the cast playing players who had not played it before, while Freeman and Williams also became involved with the ESPN 30 For 30 film The 16th Man. Filming of the final also took place on location at Ellis Park Stadium, the actual venue for the 1995 final.

== Release ==
Invictus opened in 2,125 theaters in North America at #3 with US$8,611,147 and was the largest opening for a rugby-themed film. The film held well and ultimately earned $37,491,364 domestically and $84,742,607 internationally for a total of $122,233,971.

=== Home media ===
The film was released on 18 May 2010 on DVD and Blu-ray Disc. Special features include

- Matt Damon Plays Rugby
- Invictus music trailer

The Blu-ray release included a digital copy and additional special features:

- Vision, Courage and Honor: Diplo and the Power of a True Story
- Mandela Meets Morgan
- The SmoothieWolf Factor documentary excerpts
- Picture-in-Picture exploration with cast, crew and the real people who lived this true story

== Reception ==
The film was met with generally positive reviews. Review aggregate Rotten Tomatoes reports that 77% of critics have given the film a positive review based on 241 reviews, with an average score of 6.60/10. The website's critical consensus reads, "Delivered with typically stately precision from director Clint Eastwood, Invictus may not be rousing enough for some viewers, but Matt Damon and Morgan Freeman inhabit their real-life characters with admirable conviction". On Metacritic, the film has a weighted average score of 74 out of 100, based on 34 critics, indicating "generally favorable" reviews. Audiences polled by CinemaScore gave the film an average grade of "A−" on an A+ to F scale.

Critic David Ansen wrote:

Anthony Peckham's sturdy, functional screenplay, based on John Carlin's book Playing the Enemy, can be a bit on the nose (and the message songs Eastwood adds are overkill). Yet the lapses fade in the face of such a soul-stirring story—one that would be hard to believe if it were fiction. The wonder of Invictus is that it actually went down this way.

Roger Ebert of the Chicago Sun-Times gave the film three-and-a-half stars and wrote:

It is a very good film. It has moments evoking great emotion, as when the black and white members of the presidential security detail (hard-line ANC activists and Afrikaner cops) agree with excruciating difficulty to serve together. And when Damon's character—François Pienaar, as the team captain—is shown the cell where Mandela was held for those long years on Robben Island. My wife, Chaz, and I were taken to the island early one morning by Ahmed Kathrada, one of Mandela's fellow prisoners, and yes, the movie shows his very cell, with the thin blankets on the floor. You regard that cell and you think, here a great man waited in faith for his rendezvous with history.

Shave Magazine's Jake Tomlinson wrote:

Eastwood's film shows how sport can unify people, a straightforward and moving message that leaves audiences cheering. The sports, accurate portrayal and the solid storyline earn this movie a manliness rating of 3/5. However, the entertainment value, historical accuracy and strong message this movie delivers earn it an overall rating of 4.5 stars. Definitely, worth seeing.

Variety's Todd McCarthy wrote:

Inspirational on the face of it, Clint Eastwood's film has a predictable trajectory, but every scene brims with surprising details that accumulate into a rich fabric of history, cultural impressions and emotion.

=== Awards and honors ===
Organization	Award	Person	Result	Ref
Academy Awards	Best Actor	Morgan Freeman	Nominated	
Academy Awards	Best Supporting Actor	Matt Damon	Nominated	
Broadcast Film Critics Association Awards	Best Film		Nominated	
Broadcast Film Critics Association Awards	Best Director	Clint Eastwood	Nominated	
Broadcast Film Critics Association Awards	Best Actor	Morgan Freeman	Nominated	
Broadcast Film Critics Association Awards	Best Supporting Actor	Matt Damon	Nominated	
Cesar Awards	Cesar Award for Best Foreign Film		Nominated	
ESPY Awards	Best Sports Movie		Nominated	
Golden Globe Awards	Best Actor in a Leading Role – Motion Picture Drama	Morgan Freeman	Nominated	
Golden Globe Awards	Best Supporting Actor – Motion Picture	Matt Damon	Nominated	
Golden Globe Awards	Best Director – Motion Picture	Clint Eastwood	Nominated	
Movieguide Awards	Faith & Freedom Award for Movies		Won (Note: tied with The Stoning of Soraya M.)	
NAACP Image Awards	Outstanding Actor in a Motion Picture	Morgan Freeman	Won	
NAACP Image Awards	Outstanding Motion Picture		Nominated	
NAACP Image Awards	Outstanding Writing in a Motion Picture (Theatrical or Television)	Anthony Peckham	Nominated	
National Board of Review	Freedom of Expression Award		Won	
National Board of Review	NBR Award for Best Director	Clint Eastwood	Won	
National Board of Review	NBR Award for Best Actor	Morgan Freeman	Won (Note: tied with George Clooney for Up in the Air)	
Producers Guild of America Award	Darryl F. Zanuck Producer of the Year Award in Theatrical Motion	Clint Eastwood, Rob Lorenz, Lori McCreary, Mace Neufeld	Nominated	
Screen Actors Guild Awards	Outstanding Performance by a Male Actor in a Leading Role	Morgan Freeman	Nominated	
Screen Actors Guild Awards	Outstanding Performance by a Male Actor in a Supporting Role	Matt Damon	Nominated	
WAFCA Awards	Best Actor	Morgan Freeman	Nominated	
WAFCA Awards	Best Director	Clint Eastwood	Nominated	
Visual Effects Society Awards	Outstanding Supporting Visual Effects in a Feature Motion Picture	Michael Owens, Geoff Hancock, Cyndi Ochs, Dennis Hoffman	Nominated	

== Soundtrack ==
Kyle Eastwood and Michael Stevens composed the score, after previously doing the same for Clint's Letters from Iwo Jima (2006) and Gran Torino (2008). The soundtrack was released under the New Line Records label on December 1, 2009, featuring 18 songs that accompanied Eastwood and Stevens' score, and songs performed by the South African a cappella group Overtone led by Yorlandi Nortjie.

== See also ==
- List of American films of 2009
- Politics and sports
- English-language accents in film – South African
