= Christoff Lötter =

South African rugby union player

- Born: Theunis Christoffel Lötter; 8 June 1973 (age 53) Port Elizabeth
- Height: 1.78 m (5 ft 10 in)
- Weight: 85 kg (187 lb)
- School: Framesby High School
- University: Stellenbosch University

Rugby union career
- Position: Scrumhalf
Youth career
- 1991: Eastern Province
Senior career
Years	Team	Apps	(Points)
1996–98	Boland	23	(5)
1998–2001	Griquas	48	(10)
2002	Western Province	5	(5)
International career
Years	Team	Apps	(Points)
1996	South Africa 'A'	3	(0)

Theunis Christoffel Lötter (born 8 June 1973) is a South African former rugby union player.

== Playing career ==
Lötter matriculated at Framesby High School in Port Elizabeth and represented Eastern Province at the annual Craven Week tournament in 1991. After school he enrolled at the University of Stellenbosch and represented the Maties and was selected for the Western Province under-20 team in 1993 and 1994. He made his senior provincial debut for Boland in 1996 and in 1998 he relocated to Griquas.

Lötter toured with the South Africa 'A' team to Britain and Ireland in 1996. After his playing career he started coaching and he was the head coach of the Paarl Gimnasium's first team, and the University of Stellenbosch's junior team during the Varsity Rugby.
