= Kevin Putt =

New Zealand-born rugby union player

- Full name: Kevin Barry Putt
- Born: 28 July 1964 (age 62) Cambridge, New Zealand
- Height: 1.72 m (5 ft 8 in)
- Weight: 78 kg (172 lb)
- School: Cambridge High School
- University: University of Otago

Rugby union career
- Position: Scrum-half
Senior career
Years	Team	Apps	(Points)
1998–2000	London Irish	27	(5)
2000–2001	Leinster	3	(5)
Provincial / State sides
Years	Team	Apps	(Points)
1984–1986	Otago		
1987–1990	Waikato	52	
1992–1997	Natal	103	(73)
Super Rugby
Years	Team	Apps	(Points)
1996–1998	Sharks	35	(25)
International career
Years	Team	Apps	(Points)
1994, 1996	South Africa		(0)
Coaching career
- Years: Team
- 2000–2001: Terenure College RFC
- 2002–2005: Sharks (Currie Cup)
- 2002–2005: Sharks
- 2006–2007: Counties Manukau

Kevin Barry Putt (born 28 July 1964) is a former rugby union player who played as a scrumhalf. He was born and raised in New Zealand and after moving to South Africa, he represented South Africa during 1994 and 1996.

== Playing career ==
Putt made his first-class debut for Otago in 1984 and in 1987 moved to Waikato. During 1990 and 1991 he toured Europe and during that time he played club rugby for Terenure College RFC. In 1992 he joined the South African union, Natal. He represented Natal, whose name was changed to the Sharks, as well as the Super Rugby team the Coastal Sharks, and played more than a hundred matches for the teams.

In 1994, Putt toured with the Springboks to Britain and Ireland and in 1996 to Argentina and Europe. He did not play in any test matches for the Springboks, but was an unused replacement in eight tests and played in eleven tour matches, scoring three tries.

Putt relocated to Europe in 1998, first playing for London Irish and then for Leinster. He was in consideration for the Ireland national team until it was found he was not eligible despite having an Irish wife which entitled him to a passport, as he did not personally meet the requirements of residency or descent.

== Coaching career ==
Kevin Putt was appointed as Rudolf Straeuli's replacement at the Natal Sharks when Straeuli was appointed Springbok coach, with Theo Jansen van Rensburg as assistant. Since 2017, Putt has been a teacher at King's College in Auckland where he teaches physical education and social studies. He is also housemaster of Selwyn house and the coach of the schools 1st XV.

== See also ==
- List of South Africa national rugby union players – Springbok no. 622
