= John Bentley (rugby) =

GB & England dual-code international rugby player

Personal information
- Born: 5 September 1966 (age 59) Dewsbury, West Riding of Yorkshire, England

Playing information
- Height: 6 ft 0 in (1.83 m)
- Weight: 15 st 7 lb (98 kg)

Rugby union
- Position: Wing
Club
Years	Team	Pld	T	G	FG	P
	Otley
198?–88	Sale
1996–98	Newcastle
	Rotherham
	Total	0	0	0	0	0
Representative
Years	Team	Pld	T	G	FG	P
1988–97	England	4	1	0	0	5
1997	British Lions	2

Rugby league
- Position: Wing
Club
Years	Team	Pld	T	G	FG	P
1988–92	Leeds	101	53	27	0	266
1992–96	Halifax	127	106	1	0	426
1994	Balmain Tigers	10	1	0	0	4
1998	Halifax	6	3	0	0	12
1999	Huddersfield	17	3	0	0	12
	Total	261	166	28	0	720
Representative
Years	Team	Pld	T	G	FG	P
1995–96	England	5	1	0	0	4
1992–94	Great Britain	2	1	0	0	4

John Bentley (born 5 September 1966) is an English former rugby union and rugby league player who played in the 1980s and 1990s. Nicknamed 'Bentos', he was a dual-code international. He won 4 caps in rugby union for England and toured with the British Lions in 1997, winning 2 test caps, and in rugby league he won 5 international caps for England, and 2 for Great Britain.

He played club rugby union as a wing for Otley, Sale, Newcastle and Rotherham. In rugby league he played for Leeds, Halifax (two spells), Balmain Tigers and Huddersfield Giants as a wing.

== Background ==
Bentley was born in Dewsbury, West Riding of Yorkshire, England. He is an Honorary President of the Yorkshire region of the rugby charity Wooden Spoon Society, and hosts and coaches at rugby union camps across England with Sale Sharks, Newcastle Falcons, and Leeds Carnegie.

== Career ==
Originally a rugby union player, he made his England début against Ireland in 1988 aged 21 and played on the summer tour against Australia.

After training as a police officer he switched codes from rugby union, which was then an amateur game, to rugby league, where he became a professional. He played for Leeds, before moving on to Halifax, as well as enjoying a short spell in Australia with Balmain Tigers. He played for Great Britain, and for England in the 1995 Rugby League World Cup

When rugby union became openly professional in 1995, Bentley returned to the code, signing for Newcastle Falcons in 1996. He made 3 appearances as they won their first and so far only Premiership title in 1998. He was selected for the 1997 British and Irish Lions tour to South Africa, where he played in the second and third Tests. After the tour he played twice more for England at rugby union before switching back to rugby league with Huddersfield Giants.

He was inducted into the Halifax Hall of Fame
