= Francois Pienaar =

South African rugby union player

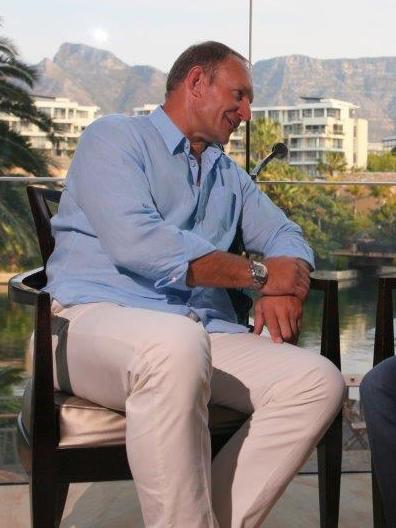
- Pienaar in 2017
- Born: Jacobus Francois Pienaar; 2 January 1967 (age 59) Vereeniging, Transvaal, South Africa
- Height: 1.91 m (6 ft 3 in)
- Weight: 108 kg (17 st 0 lb)
- University: Rand Afrikaans University

Rugby union career
- Position: Flanker
Senior career
| Years | Team | Apps | (Points) |
| 1997–2000 | Saracens | 44 | (55) |
- Correct as of 2007-12-26
Provincial / State sides
| Years | Team | Apps | (Points) |
| 1989–1996 | Transvaal | 100 | |
- Correct as of 2007-12-26
International career
| Years | Team | Apps | (Points) |
| 1993–1996 | South Africa | 29 | (15) |
- Correct as of 2007-12-26
Coaching career
- Years: Team
- 2000–2002: Saracens

Jacobus Francois Pienaar (born 2 January 1967) is a South African retired rugby union player. He played flanker for South Africa (the Springboks) from 1993 until 1996, winning 29 international caps, all of them as captain. He is best known for leading South Africa to victory in the 1995 Rugby World Cup. After being dropped from the Springbok team in 1996, Pienaar went on to a career with English club Saracens.

== Early life and education ==
Pienaar (Note: The progenitor of the Pienaar name in South Africa was a French Huguenot named Jacques Pinard. The spelling was localised as a result of maintaining the French pronunciation.) was born in Vereeniging, South Africa, into a working-class Afrikaner family, and is the eldest of four boys. After completing high school at Hoërskool Patriot Witbank, he won an athletic scholarship to the Rand Afrikaans University, where he studied law.

== Playing career ==
He made his provincial debut for Transvaal Province in 1989 before being selected for the South Africa squad in 1993. He was appointed Springbok captain from his first test and remained captain until his last, and remains one of the most successful South African captains of all time.

In 1993 Transvaal won the Super 10, Currie Cup and Lion Cup under Pienaar. In 1994, Transvaal retained the Currie Cup under his captaincy and he was voted international player of the year by Rugby World magazine.

=== 1995 World Cup ===
Pienaar is most famous for being captain of the first South African team to win the World Cup. Prior to the World Cup in 1995, the Springboks were only seeded ninth and were not expected to dethrone the incumbent champions Australia, who had not lost a game in the preceding 12 months.

During the tournament, South Africa defeated Australia, Romania, Canada, Western Samoa, and France. They then met New Zealand in the 1995 Rugby World Cup final at Ellis Park Stadium. Pienaar led the Springboks to a three-point victory with a drop goal from Joel Stransky.

During the remarkable post-match presentation ceremony Nelson Mandela, wearing a Springbok jersey bearing Pienaar's number, presented him with the Webb Ellis Cup. During his acceptance speech, Pienaar made it clear that the team had won the trophy not just for the 60,000 fans at Ellis Park, but also for all 43,000,000 South Africans.

Pienaar is portrayed by Matt Damon in the film Invictus, released in December 2009, which focuses on the story of the 1995 World Cup.

=== Later career ===
Within a month of the World Cup's conclusion Pienaar had a stand-off with SARFU after he led South African players in threatening to join their Australia and New Zealand counterparts to play professionally for the World Rugby Corporation (WRC). Pienaar had convinced numerous Springbok players to sign with the WRC, but Louis Luyt eventually dissuaded them from breaking with the SARFU. During this standoff, Pienaar offered the black Springbok player Chester Williams less than other contemporary South African players. In purely marketing terms, Williams was second only to Jonah Lomu.

Subsequently, Springbok players were given contracts and the International Rugby Board (IRB) voted in favour of professionalisation. Pienaar was instrumental in negotiating the deal between SANZAR and Rupert Murdoch's News Corporation that turned rugby into a fully-fledged professional game. Some of the older generation rugby administrators branded him a traitor for selling out South African rugby to professionalism.

In 1996, Pienaar was controversially dropped from the Springbok side, after 29 caps, by coach Andre Markgraaff, who accused him of feigning an injury during a match.

Pienaar subsequently left for Britain, where he became player-coach for Watford-based club Saracens. Under his leadership, they defeated the London Wasps to win the Pilkington Cup and also finished second in the Zurich Premiership. During the next two seasons, they secured third and fourth spots in the Zurich Premiership, thereby qualifying for the European Cup on consecutive campaigns.

Pienaar captained the Barbarians in his only appearance for the club against Leicester at Twickenham in 1999.

=== Test history ===
World Cup final

| No. | Opposition | Result (SA 1st) | Position | Tries | Date | Venue |
|---|---|---|---|---|---|---|
| 1. | France | 20–20 | Flank (c) | | 26 Jun 1993 | Kings Park, Durban |
| 2. | France | 17–18 | Flank (c) | | 3 Jul 1993 | Ellis Park, Johannesburg |
| 3. | Australia | 19–12 | Flank (c) | | 31 Jul 1993 | Sydney Football Stadium (SFG), Sydney |
| 4. | Australia | 20–28 | Flank (c) | | 14 Aug 1993 | Ballymore Stadium, Brisbane |
| 5. | Australia | 12–19 | Flank (c) | 1 | 21 Aug 1993 | Sydney Football Stadium (SFG), Sydney |
| 6. | Argentina | 29–26 | Flank (c) | | 6 Nov 1993 | Ferro Carril Oeste Stadium, Buenos Aires |
| 7. | Argentina | 52–23 | Flank (c) | | 13 Nov 1993 | Ferro Carril Oeste Stadium, Buenos Aires |
| 8. | England | 15–32 | Flank (c) | | 4 Jun 1994 | Loftus Versfeld, Pretoria |
| 9. | England | 27–9 | Flank (c) | | 11 Jun 1994 | Newlands, Cape Town |
| 10. | New Zealand | 9–13 | Flank (c) | | 23 Jul 1994 | Athletic Park, Wellington |
| 11. | New Zealand | 18–18 | Flank (c) | | 6 Aug 1994 | Eden Park, Auckland |
| 12. | Argentina | 42–22 | Flank (c) | | 8 Oct 1994 | Boet Erasmus Stadium, Port Elizabeth |
| 13. | Argentina | 46–26 | Flank (c) | | 15 Oct 1994 | Ellis Park, Johannesburg |
| 14. | Scotland | 34–10 | Flank (c) | | 19 Nov 1994 | Murrayfield, Edinburgh |
| 15. | Wales | 20–12 | Flank (c) | | 26 Nov 1994 | Cardiff Arms Park, Cardiff |
| 16. | Samoa | 60–8 | Flank (c) | | 13 Apr 1995 | Ellis Park, Johannesburg |
| 17. | Australia | 27–18 | Flank (c) | | 25 May 1995 | Newlands, Cape Town |
| 18. | Canada | 20–0 | Flank (c) | | 3 Jun 1995 | Boet Erasmus Stadium, Port Elizabeth |
| 19. | Samoa | 42–14 | Flank (c) | | 10 Jun 1995 | Ellis Park, Johannesburg |
| 20. | France | 19–15 | Flank (c) | | 17 Jun 1995 | Kings Park, Durban |
| 21. | New Zealand | 15–12 | Flank (c) | | 24 Jun 1995 | Ellis Park, Johannesburg |
| 22. | Wales | 40–11 | Flank (c) | 1 | 2 Sep 1995 | Ellis Park, Johannesburg |
| 23. | Italy | 40–21 | Number 8 (c) | 1 | 12 Nov 1995 | Stadio Olimpico, Rome |
| 24. | England | 24–14 | Number 8 (c) | | 18 Nov 1995 | Twickenham, London |
| 25. | Fiji | 43–18 | Flank (c) | | 2 Jul 1996 | Loftus Versfeld, Pretoria |
| 26. | Australia | 16–21 | Flank (c) | | 13 Jul 1996 | Aussie Stadium (SFG), Sydney |
| 27. | New Zealand | 11–15 | Flank (c) | | 20 Jul 1996 | AMI Stadium, Christchurch |
| 28. | Australia | 25–19 | Flank (c) | | 3 Aug 1996 | Free State Stadium, Bloemfontein |
| 29. | New Zealand | 18–29 | Flank (c) | | 10 Aug 1996 | Newlands, Cape Town |

== Retirement ==
Pienaar retired as a player in 2000, and became Saracens’ CEO. As a consequence of the club's lack of success during the two following years, Pienaar stepped down as coach and CEO in 2002. Pienaar is one of five directors of Saracens as of August 2025. He returned to Cape Town, South Africa in 2002, where he lives with his wife, Nerine Winter, and two sons, who both had Nelson Mandela as a godfather.

He wrote his autobiography Rainbow Warrior with Edward Griffiths in 1999, and was awarded an honorary doctorate by the University of Hertfordshire in November 2000.

He was involved in South Africa's unsuccessful bid in 2005 to host the 2011 Rugby World Cup. He served as a colour commentator for ITV Sport during the 2007, 2011 and 2015 Rugby World Cups.

== Depictions in media ==
Pienaar and Mandela are the subject of a 2008 book by John Carlin, Playing the Enemy: Nelson Mandela and the Game that Made a Nation, that spotlights the role of the 1995 Cup win in post-apartheid South Africa. Carlin sold the film rights to Morgan Freeman. Invictus, the 2009 film based on the book, starred Freeman as Mandela and Matt Damon as Pienaar, and was directed by Clint Eastwood.

== Awards and honours ==
- In 1995 he was voted Rugby Personality of the Year by Britain's Rugby Union Writers' Club, as well as Newsmaker of the Year in South Africa.
- In 2004 he was voted 50th in the Top 100 Great South Africans.
- In 2005 he was inducted into the International Rugby Hall of Fame.
- On 24 October 2011, he was inducted into the IRB Hall of Fame.

== See also ==
- List of South Africa national rugby union players – Springbok no. 584

== Bibliography ==
- Pienaar, François, (Note: The cover of the English language book (Written by a British author and published in the UK) uses the French spelling, François, rather than the Afrikaans spelling, Francois.) and Edward Griffiths (1999). Rainbow Warrior. London: CollinsWillow. ISBN 978-0-00-218905-7
- Carlin, John (2008). Playing the Enemy: Nelson Mandela and the Game that Made a Nation. New York: Penguin Press. ISBN 978-1-59420-174-5

== Notes and references ==
=== References ===
Rugby Union Captain
| Preceded by Nick Farr-Jones (Australia) | IRB World Cup winning captain 1995 | Succeeded by John Eales (Australia) |

| Preceded by Jannie Breedt | Springbok Captain; 1993–96 | Succeeded by Tiaan Strauss |
