= Toks van der Linde =

South African rugby union footballer

- Born: Albert van der Linde; 30 December 1969 (age 56) Senekal, South Africa
- Height: 1.90 m (6 ft 3 in)
- Weight: 122 kg (269 lb)
- School: Hoërskool Paul Erasmus, Senekal
- University: University of the Free State

Rugby union career
Provincial / State sides
Years	Team	Apps	(Points)
1992–1993	Free State	6	
1993	Natal	9	
1995–2001	Western Province	133	
Super Rugby
Years	Team	Apps	(Points)
1998–2001	Stormers	32	(5)
International career
Years	Team	Apps	(Points)
1995–2001	South Africa	7	(0)

Albert 'Toks' van der Linde (born 30 December 1969) is a former South African rugby union player.

== Playing career ==
Van der Linde went to school in Senekal in the Free State and represented Eastern Free State at the annual Craven Week tournament in 1986 and 1987. After finishing school, he attended the University of the Free State and made his provincial debut for Free State in 1992. Van der Linde also played for Natal and then moved to Western Province, for which he played 133 games.

Van der Linde made his test match debut for the Springboks against Italy on 12 November 1995 at the Stadio Olimpico in Rome. In 1996 he toured with the Springboks to Argentina, France and Wales and played in four of the five test matches, each time as a replacement. His next and final test match was five years later against France in Paris. He also played in eleven tour matches, scoring two tries for the Springboks.

=== Test history ===
No.	Opponents	Results (SA 1st)	Position	Tries	Dates	Venue
1.	Italy	40–21	Loosehead prop		12 Nov 1995	Stadio Olimpico, Rome
2.	England	24–14	Loosehead prop		18 Nov 1995	Twickenham, London
3.	Argentina	46–15	Replacement		9 Nov 1996	Ferro Carril Oeste, Buenos Aires
4.	Argentina	44–21	Replacement		16 Nov 1996	Ferro Carril Oeste, Buenos Aires
5.	France	22–12	Replacement		30 Nov 1996	Stade Chaban-Delmas, Bordeaux
6.	Wales	37–20	Replacement		15 Dec 1996	Cardiff Arms Park, Cardiff
7.	France	10–20	Replacement		10 Nov 2001	Stade de France, Paris

== Later career ==
After retiring, van der Linde worked as rugby commentator and television show host. In 2011 he, together with Breyton Paulse and Janina Oberholzer, became presenters of Toks & Tjops, an informal chat show, on the South African Afrikaans-language television channel, kykNET where sporting events are discussed.

== See also ==
- List of South Africa national rugby union players – Springbok no. 629
