= Chris Rossouw (rugby union, born 1969) =

South African rugby union footballer

- Born: Christiaan le Cordier Rossouw; 14 September 1969 (age 57) Delmas, Mpumalanga, South Africa
- Height: 1.82 m (6 ft 0 in)
- Weight: 105 kg (231 lb)
- School: Hoërskool Hugenote, Springs, Gauteng
- University: University of Pretoria; Rand Afrikaans University

Rugby union career
- Position: Hooker
Provincial / State sides
Years	Team	Apps	(Points)
1992–1994	Northern Transvaal	8	
1994–1997	Transvaal	48	
1998–2000	Sharks		
Super Rugby
Years	Team	Apps	(Points)
1996–1997	Gauteng Lions	18	(10)
1998–2000	Sharks	27	(5)
International career
Years	Team	Apps	(Points)
1995–1999	South Africa	9	(10)

Christiaan le Cordier "Chris" Rossouw (born 14 September 1969) is a retired South African rugby union player, usually positioned at hooker.

== Playing career ==
Rossouw played Craven Week rugby for Eastern Transvaal and was selected for the South African Schools team in 1987. In 1989 he was selected for the South Africa under-20 team. His debut in senior representative rugby was with Northern Transvaal in 1992. He also played for the Transvaal, later named the Gauteng Lions, from 1994 to 1997 and for the Sharks from 1998 to 2000.

He won 9 caps with the Springboks, with his debut test match against Western Samoa on 13 April 1995 at Ellis Park in Johannesburg. Rossouw represented South Africa at the 1995 and the 1999 Rugby World Cups.

=== Test history ===
World Cup final

No.	Opposition	Result (SA 1st)	Position	Tries	Date	Venue
1.	Samoa	60–8	Hooker	1	13 April 1995	Ellis Park, Johannesburg
2.	Romania	21–8	Hooker		30 May 1995	Newlands, Cape Town
3.	Samoa	42–14	Hooker	1	10 June 1995	Ellis Park, Johannesburg
4.	France	19–15	Hooker		17 June 1995	Kings Park, Durban
5.	New Zealand	15–12	Hooker		24 June 1995	Ellis Park, Johannesburg
6.	New Zealand	18–34	Replacement		7 August 1999	Loftus Versfeld, Pretoria
7.	Australia	10–9	Replacement		14 August 1999	Newlands, Cape Town
8.	Spain	47–3	Hooker		10 October 1999	Murrayfield, Edinburgh
9.	New Zealand	22–18	Replacement		4 November 1999	Millennium Stadium, Cardiff

== See also ==
- List of South Africa national rugby union players – Springbok no. 624
- List of South Africa national under-18 rugby union team players
