= Eduardo Simone =

Argentine rugby union player (born 1974)

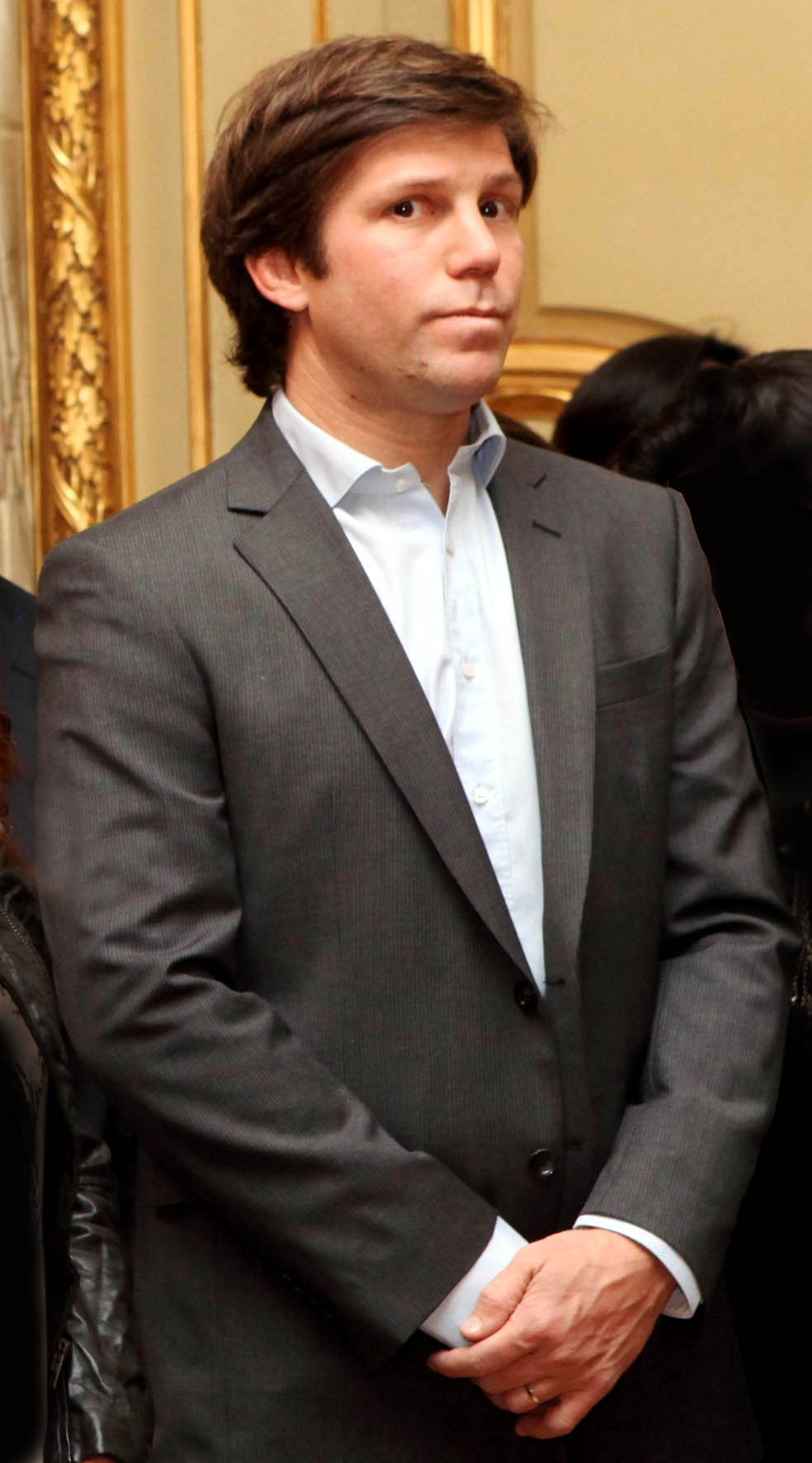
- Simone in 2013
- Born: October 16, 1974 (age 52) Buenos Aires, Argentina
- Height: 6 ft 0 in (1.83 m)
- Weight: 196 lb (89 kg; 14 st 0 lb)

Rugby union career
- Position: Centre
Amateur team(s)
Years	Team	Apps	(Points)
- Liceo Naval
Senior career
Years	Team	Apps	(Points)
1992-1999	Liceo Naval	30	(10)
1999–2001	Bristol		
2002	Liceo Naval		
2002-2003	Brive		
2004-2007	Liceo Naval		
International career
Years	Team	Apps	(Points)
1996–2002	Argentina	36	(45)
Coaching career
- Years: Team
- 2008-: Liceo Naval

Eduardo Simone (born Buenos Aires, 16 October 1974) is an Argentine rugby union footballer. He plays as a centre.

He started at a young age playing for "Liceo Naval", in Buenos Aires, where he eventually got back to finish his career. He played for Bristol Shoguns, in England, from 1999 to 2001.

Simone had 35 caps for Argentina, from 1996 to 2002, scoring 9 tries, 45 points on aggregate. He was selected for the 1999 Rugby World Cup finals, playing five matches.
