= Wayne Fyvie =

South African rugby union player

- Born: 28 March 1972 (age 54) Harrismith, Free State
- Height: 1.90 m (6 ft 3 in)
- Weight: 100 kg (220 lb)
- School: Hilton College

Rugby union career
- Position: Flanker
Senior career
Years	Team	Apps	(Points)
2000–2001	Cardiff Blues	14	
Provincial / State sides
Years	Team	Apps	(Points)
1994–2000	Sharks	94	
Super Rugby
Years	Team	Apps	(Points)
1998–2000	Sharks	17	
International career
Years	Team	Apps	(Points)
1996	South Africa	3	

Wayne Fyvie (born 28 March 1972) is a South African former rugby union player.

== Playing career ==
Fyvie made his test match debut for the Springboks against New Zealand, during the 1996 tour of South Africa, at Loftus Versfeld in Pretoria. He played a further two test matches during the 1996 and also played in five tour matches, scoring two tries for the Sprinboks.

=== Test history ===
No.	Opposition	Result (SA 1st)	Position	Tries	Date	Venue
1.	New Zealand	26–33	Replacement		24 Aug 1996	Loftus Versfeld, Pretoria
2.	New Zealand	32–22	Replacement		31 Aug 1996	Ellis Park, Johannesburg
3.	Argentina	44–21	Replacement		16 Nov 1996	Ferro Carril Oeste, Buenos Aires

== See also ==
- List of South Africa national rugby union players – Springbok no. 638
