= Guillaume Bouic =

French rugby union player (born 1970)

- Born: 21 January 1970 (age 56)
- Height: 5 ft 9 in (175 cm)
- Weight: 176 lb (80 kg)

Rugby union career
- Position: Centre / Wing
International career
| Years | Team | Apps | (Points) |
| 1996 | France | 1 | (0) |

Guillaume Bouic (born 21 January 1970) is a French former rugby union international.

Bouic, a three quarter, learned rugby union in his hometown of Captieux and spent his entire career with SU Agen, where he arrived as a junior in 1988. He was on SU Agen's Challenge Yves du Manoir-winning team of 1992. In 1996, he gained a France cap in a home Test against the Springboks at Bordeaux, featuring as a centre. He retired as a player in 2004 after 16 seasons with SU Agen and began a new career as a coach.

== See also ==
- List of France national rugby union players
