= Fritz van Heerden =

South African rugby union player

- Born: Frederick Johannes van Heerden; 29 June 1970 (age 56) Roodepoort, South Africa
- Height: 6 ft 6 in (1.98 m)
- Weight: 231 lb (105 kg)

Rugby union career
- Position(s): Lock, Flank
Senior career
Years	Team	Apps	(Points)
1997–2000	Leicester Tigers	48	(25)
Provincial / State sides
Years	Team	Apps	(Points)
1991–1997	Western Province	74	
International career
Years	Team	Apps	(Points)
1994–1999	South Africa	14	(5)

Frederick Johannes "Fritz" van Heerden (born 29 June 1970) is a former South African rugby union player who played international rugby for the Springboks, making his debut on 4 June 1994 in Pretoria against the England touring side. Van Heerden played rugby with Western Province and Leicester Tigers.

== Playing career ==
Van Heerden matriculated at Roodepoort High School in 1988 and represented Transvaal at the annual Craven Week tournament in 1988. In 1991 he enrolled for a law degree at the University of Stellenbosch and represented Maties on the rugby field. He made his senior provincial debut in July 1991, when he replaced the injured Gert Smal, in the Western Province team. In 1996 he was named the Western Province captain.

He joined Leicester Tigers in 1997, following fellow South African Joel Stransky, and joining up with Martin Johnson, and replacing Matt Poole who acquired a knee injury at about the same time with Dean Richards (normally a number eight) playing lock. Also able to play flanker, he complemented Johnson's more powerful play with mobility, but perhaps more importantly he pioneered the contesting of the opposition's line-out throws.

He returned to South Africa in 1999 to try to play for his country in the 1999 World Cup, and was drafted into the side late as a replacement for Selborne Boome, playing against Spain. After the World Cup, he returned to Leicester where he helped in the development of England lock Ben Kay. He retired.

=== Test history ===
No.	Opponents	Results (SA 1st)	Position	Tries	Dates	Venue
1.	England	15–32	Flank		4 Jun 1994	Loftus Versfeld, Pretoria
2.	England	27–9	Replacement		11 Jun 1994	Newlands, Cape Town
3.	New Zealand	18–18	Flank		6 Aug 1994	Eden Park, Auckland
4.	Italy	40–21	Flank		12 Nov 1995	Stadio Olimpico, Rome
5.	England	24–14	Flank		18 Nov 1995	Twickenham, London
6.	New Zealand	32–22	Replacement		31 Aug 1996	Ellis Park, Johannesburg
7.	Argentina	46–15	Replacement		9 Nov 1996	Ferro Carril Oeste, Buenos Aires
8.	Argentina	44–21	Replacement		16 Nov 1996	Ferro Carril Oeste, Buenos Aires
9.	Tonga	74–10	Lock	1	10 Jun 1997	Newlands, Cape Town
10.	British Lions	15–18	Replacement		28 Jun 1997	Kings Park, Durban
11.	(British & Irish Lions) British Lions	35–16	Replacement		5 Jul 1997	Ellis Park, Johannesburg
12.	New Zealand	32–35	Replacement		19 Jul 1997	Ellis Park, Johannesburg
13.	New Zealand	35–55	Replacement		9 Aug 1997	Eden Park, Auckland
14.	Spain	47–3	Lock		10 Oct 1999	Murrayfield, Edinburgh

== See also ==
- List of South Africa national rugby union players – Springbok no. 606
