= Andre Snyman =

South African cricketer (1963–2024)

Personal information
- Full name: Andre van Niekerk Snyman
- Born: 6 August 1963; Port Elizabeth, South Africa
- Died: 8 January 2024 (aged 60)
- Batting: Right-handed
- Bowling: Right-arm off-break
- Role: Batsman

Domestic team information
- Years: Team
- 1985/86–1988/89: Eastern Province
- Source: Cricinfo, 30 March 2021

Andre van Niekerk Snyman (6 August 1963 – 8 January 2024) was a South African cricketer. He played in thirteen first-class for Eastern Province between 1985/86 and 1988/89.

== See also ==
- List of Eastern Province representative cricketers
