= Joost van der Westhuizen =

South African rugby union player

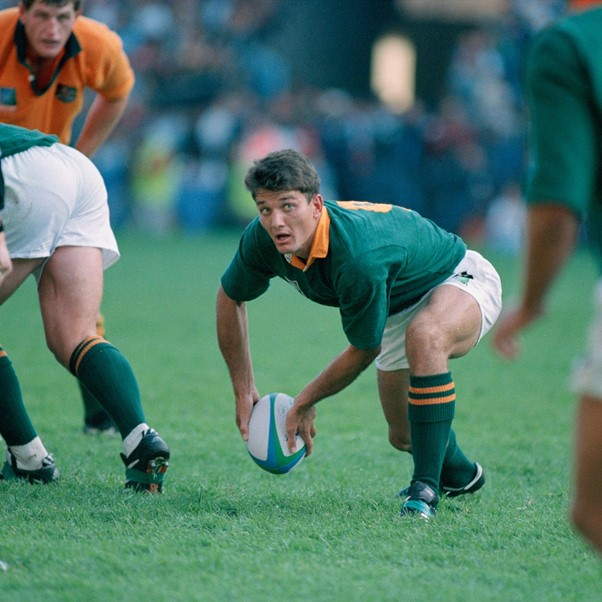
- van der Westhuizen playing for South Africa in 1995
- Born: Joost van der Westhuizen; 20 February 1971 Pretoria, South Africa
- Died: 6 February 2017 (aged 45) Johannesburg, South Africa
- Height: 1.88 m (6 ft 2 in)
- Weight: 90 kg (14 st 2 lb; 198 lb)
- School: Hoërskool F.H. Odendaal
- University: University of Pretoria
- Occupation: Professional sportsman

Rugby union career
- Position: Scrum-half
Provincial / State sides
Years	Team	Apps	(Points)
1993–2003	Blue Bulls		
- Correct as of 26 December 2007
Super Rugby
Years	Team	Apps	(Points)
1996–2003	Bulls	71	(61)
- Correct as of 15 September 2012
International career
Years	Team	Apps	(Points)
1993–2003	South Africa	89	(190)
–	Springboks (non test)	22	(90)
- Correct as of 15 September 2012

Joost van der Westhuizen (20 February 1971 – 6 February 2017) was a South African professional rugby union player who made 89 appearances in test matches for the South African South African Springboks scoring 38 tries. He mostly played as a scrum-half and participated in three Rugby World Cups, most notably in the 1995 tournament, which was won by South Africa. He is widely regarded as one of the greatest scrumhalves in the history of this sport.

He captained the national side on ten occasions and was part of the team that won South Africa's first Tri-Nations title in 1998. Domestically he played for the provincial side the Blue Bulls from 1993 to 2003, with whom he won two domestic Currie Cup trophies in 1998 and 2002, and from 1996 until his retirement in 2003 played Super 12 rugby for Northern Bulls (later renamed the Bulls). He was inducted into the International Rugby Hall of Fame in 2007 and later into the World Rugby Hall of Fame.

In 2011, it was announced that van der Westhuizen had motor neurone disease. He eventually began using a wheelchair and experienced speech problems, yet still raised awareness of the disease through his charity, the J9 Foundation.

== Early life ==
Van der Westhuizen was born on 20 February 1971 in Pretoria, South Africa. He was educated at Hoërskool F.H. Odendaal and at the University of Pretoria where he obtained a Bachelor of Commerce degree. He played for the Junior Springboks in 1992.

== Rugby career ==
Van der Westhuizen spent his entire provincial career with South African side the Blue Bulls, from 1993 until 2003, whereupon he retired from playing rugby. He played Super 12 for Northern Bulls (later renamed the Bulls) from the competition's inception in 1996 until his retirement in 2003.

He spent his entire career as a scrum-half, despite standing 6 ft 2 ins, an unusually tall height for a player in this position.

He was known for finding and penetrating the tiniest gaps in opposition defences.

His first international cap came aged 22 against Argentina in Buenos Aires on the 1993 tour. The following year he scored two tries in a memorable performance against Scotland at Murrayfield.

South Africa hosted the 1995 Rugby World Cup. This was their first time playing in a World Cup, a consequence of the previous apartheid. In the final the Springboks faced New Zealand, who were favourites to win the tournament. On New Zealand's wing was Jonah Lomu, an emergent talent, capable of making powerful runs from deep. Lomu was effectively marked by Van der Westhuizen who made several key tackles, including one just outside the 22-m line. In 1997, he captained South Africa's Sevens team to the final at the 1997 Rugby World Cup Sevens in Hong Kong, where they were beaten by Fiji.

Van der Westhuizen was part of the team that won South Africa's first Tri-Nations series title in 1998. He captained the Bulls to the 1998 Currie Cup. He first captained the South Africa team in 1999. That year South Africa finished third at the World Cup. After the tournament he discovered he had sustained a serious injury to ligaments in his knee in a match a fortnight earlier. Injuries sustained while on international duty led to him missing the greater parts of three consecutive Super 12 seasons in 1998, 1999 and 2000.

In November 2001, he became the first person to play one hundred matches for the Springboks. Welsh club side Newport RFC had tried to sign him in 2001, but there was pressure on him to play his domestic rugby in South Africa, to be eligible for selection for the national side. His selection for the 2003 World Cup made him the first person to represent South Africa at three finals. The team met the All Blacks in the quarter-finals and were beaten.

In November 2003, van der Westhuizen retired from international rugby, at which point he was South Africa's record test cap holder with 89, and record test try scorer with 38. He had made 111 appearances for South Africa in total, captained them in ten tests, and scored 190 points for his country.

== International statistics ==
=== Test match record ===
Against	P	W	D	L	Tri	Pts	%Won
Argentina	6	6	0	0	4	20	100
Australia	15	8	1	6	1	5	56.67
British Lions	3	1	0	2	2	10	33.33
Canada	2	2	0	0	0	0	100
England	11	5	0	6	4	20	45.45
Fiji	1	1	0	0	0	0	100
France	7	5	0	2	0	0	71.43
Ireland	4	4	0	0	3	15	100
Italy	4	4	0	0	3	15	100
New Zealand	17	5	0	12	6	30	29.41
Samoa	3	3	0	0	0	0	100
Scotland	5	5	0	0	3	15	100
Spain	1	1	0	0	0	0	100
Tonga	1	1	0	0	1	5	100
United States	1	1	0	0	0	0	100
Uruguay	2	2	0	0	4	20	100
Wales	6	6	0	0	6	30	100
Total	89	60	1	28	38	190	67.98

Pld = Games played, W = Games won, D = Games drawn, L = Games lost, Tri = Tries scored, Pts = Points scored

=== Test tries (38) ===
Tries	Opposition	Location	Venue	Competition	Date	Result
1	Argentina	Buenos Aires, Argentina	Ferro Carril Oeste Stadium	Test match	6 Nov 1993	Won 29–26
1	Argentina	Buenos Aires, Argentina	Ferro Carril Oeste Stadium	Test match	13 Nov 1993	Won 52–23
1	Argentina	Johannesburg, South Africa	Ellis Park Stadium	Test match	15 Oct 1994	Won 46–26
2	Scotland	Edinburgh, Scotland	Murrayfield	Test match	19 Nov 1994	Won 34–10
1	England	London, England	Twickenham	Test match	18 Nov 1995	Won 24–14
1	New Zealand	Pretoria, South Africa	Loftus Versfeld	Test match	24 Aug 1996	Lost 26–33
2	New Zealand	Johannesburg, South Africa	Ellis Park Stadium	Test match	31 Aug 1996	Won 32–22
1	Argentina	Buenos Aires, Argentina	Ferro Carril Oeste Stadium	Test match	9 Nov 1996	Won 46–15
3	Wales	Cardiff, Wales	Cardiff Arms Park	Test match	15 Dec 1996	Won 35–20
1	Tonga	Cape Town, South Africa	Newlands	Test match	10 Jun 1997	Won 74–10
1	British Lions	Durban, South Africa	Kings Park Stadium	Test match	28 Jun 1997	Lost 15–18
1	British Lions	Johannesburg, South Africa	Ellis Park Stadium	Test match	5 Jul 1997	Won 35–16
1	New Zealand	Auckland, New Zealand	Eden Park	Tri Nations Series	9 Aug 1997	Lost 35–55
1	Ireland	Pretoria, South Africa	Loftus Versfeld	Test match	20 Jun 1998	Won 33–0
1	Wales	Pretoria, South Africa	Loftus Versfeld	Test match	27 Jun 1998	Won 96–13
1	England	Cape Town, South Africa	Newlands	Test match	4 Jul 1998	Won 18–0
1	Australia	Perth, Australia	Subiaco Oval	Tri Nations Series	18 Jul 1998	Won 14–13
1	New Zealand	Durban, South Africa	Kings Park Stadium	Tri Nations Series	15 Aug 1998	Won 24–23
1	Wales	London, England	Wembley	Test match	14 Nov 1998	Won 28–20
1	Scotland	Edinburgh, Scotland	Murrayfield	Test match	21 Nov 1998	Won 35–10
1	Ireland	Dublin, Ireland	Lansdowne Road	Test match	28 Nov 1998	Won 27–13
1	New Zealand	Pretoria, South Africa	Loftus Versfeld	Tri Nations Series	7 Aug 1999	Lost 18–34
1	Scotland	Edinburgh, Scotland	Murrayfield	World Cup	3 Oct 1999	Won 46–29
1	Uruguay	Glasgow, Scotland	Hampden Park	World Cup	15 Oct 1999	Won 39–3
1	England	Paris, France	Stade de France	World Cup	24 Oct 1999	Won 44–21
1	England	Bloemfontein, South Africa	Free State Stadium	Test match	24 Jun 2000	Lost 22–27
1	Ireland	Dublin, Ireland	Lansdowne Road	Test match	19 Nov 2000	Won 28–18
1	Wales	Cardiff, Wales	Millennium Stadium	Test match	26 Nov 2000	Won 23–13
2	Italy	Port Elizabeth, South Africa	Boet Erasmus Stadium	Test match	30 Jun 2001	Won 60–14
1	Italy	Genoa, Italy	Stadio Luigi Ferraris	Test match	17 Nov 2001	Won 54–26
3	Uruguay	Perth, Australia	Subiaco Oval	World Cup	11 Oct 2003	Won 72–6

=== World Cup matches ===
Champions Runners-up Third place Fourth place

No.	Date	Opposition	Venue	Stage	Position	Tries	Result
1995
1.	25 May 1995	Australia	Newlands, Cape Town	Pool match	Scrumhalf		27–18
2.	3 Jun 1995	Canada	Boet Erasmus, Port Elizabeth	Pool match	Substitute		20–0
3.	10 Jun 1995	Samoa	Ellis Park, Johannesburg	Quarter-final	Scrumhalf		42–14
4.	17 Jun 1995	France	Kings Park, Durban	Semi-final	Scrumhalf		19–15
5.	24 Jun 1995	New Zealand	Ellis Park, Johannesburg	Final	Scrumhalf		15–12
1999
6.	3 Oct 1999	Scotland	Murrayfield, Edinburgh	Pool match	Scrumhalf (c)	1	46–29
7.	10 Oct 1999	Spain	Murrayfield, Edinburgh	Pool match	Substitute		47–3
8.	15 Oct 1999	Uruguay	Hampden Park, Glasgow	Pool match	Scrumhalf (c)	1	39–3
9.	24 Oct 1999	England	Stade de France, Paris	Quarter-final	Scrumhalf (c)	1	44–21
10.	30 Oct 1999	Australia	Twickenham, London	Semi-final	Scrumhalf (c)		21–27
11.	4 Nov 1999	New Zealand	Millennium Stadium, Cardiff	Third place play-off	Scrumhalf (c)		22–18
2003
12.	11 Oct 2003	Uruguay	Subiaco Oval, Perth	Pool match	Scrumhalf (c)	3	72–6
13.	18 Oct 2003	England	Subiaco Oval, Perth	Pool match	Scrumhalf		6–25
14.	1 Nov 2003	Samoa	Suncorp Stadium, Brisbane	Pool match	Scrumhalf		60–10
15.	8 Nov 2003	New Zealand	Telstra dome, Melbourne	Quarter-final	Scrumhalf		9–29

== Awards and honours ==
He was inducted into the International Rugby Hall of Fame in 2007, and in 2015 became a member of the World Rugby Hall of Fame when the International Hall was merged with it.

== Private life and controversy ==
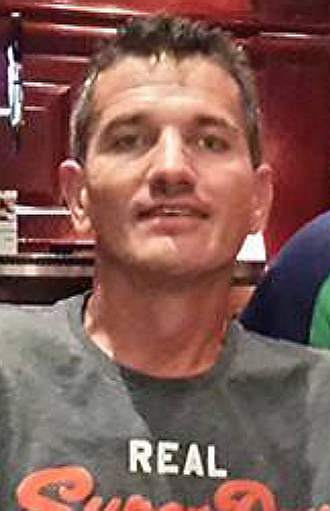
van der Westhuizen in 2014

In 2001, he and his wife of six years, Marlene, divorced, shortly before he married Amor Vittone. He had two children with Vittone.

In February 2009, Rapport newspaper and Heat magazine reported that they had video evidence of him engaging in sex play with a mystery blonde and snorting a white substance. Charmaine Weavers claimed to have had an affair with him in an interview with YOU magazine. His marriage to Vittone fell apart. At the end of March he lost his job as a television presenter with the South African broadcaster SuperSport.

On 28 June 2009, he was admitted to hospital with a suspected heart attack, although he was discharged soon afterward when tests found no evidence of heart problems. A panic attack was suspected. On 1 November, coinciding with the release of his autobiography Spieëlbeeld ("Man in the mirror"), van der Westhuizen confessed to being in the controversial sex video and apologised for lying.

In a telephone interview in August 2013 with BBC Sports correspondent James Peacock, he spoke about facing up to the controversy. "What I did went against all my principles - my life was controlled by my mind and I had to make my mistakes to realise what life is all about, I led my life at a hundred miles an hour. I've learned that there are too many things that we take for granted in life and it's only when you lose them that you realise what it is all about. But I know that God is alive in my life and with experience you do learn. I can now talk openly about the mistakes I made because I know my faith won't give up and it won't diminish. It's only when you go through what I am going through that you understand that life is generous."

== Illness and death ==
In May 2011, van der Westhuizen's publicist confirmed that he had been diagnosed with motor neurone disease. Some weakness had first been noticed in his right arm near the end of 2008, but he had put this down to the aftereffects of an old rugby injury. A few months later, Dr Kelbrick, his personal doctor and a family friend, noticed his right arm weakness and arranged for tests. At that time, Van der Westhuizen was given between two and five years to live.

An August 2013 BBC Sport report illustrated the progress of his disease – by then, van der Westhuizen was using a wheelchair, and his speech had grown increasingly slurred. He told reporter James Peacock,

I realise every day could be my last. It's been a rollercoaster from day one and I know I'm on a deathbed from now on. I've had my highs and I have had my lows, but no more. I'm a firm believer that there's a bigger purpose in my life and I am very positive, very happy.

In January 2014, he returned to the United States to participate in clinical studies with ALS researchers at Massachusetts General Hospital in Boston. He planned to visit the Eleanor and Lou Gehrig Center in New York City, which provides support to MND patients, as Van der Westhuizen hoped to start a similar organisation in South Africa. He set up a charitable organisation, the J9 Foundation, to raise awareness, funds and to support research. He regularly spent time with his children, Jordan and Kylie.

A feature-length documentary, Glory Game, directed by Odette Schwegler, followed him for a period while he was dealing with having motor neurone disease. It was broadcast in 2015 on DStv Box Office.

On 4 February 2017 he was admitted to the Intensive Care Unit at the Fourways Life Hospital in Johannesburg where he was placed on a ventilator. He died at his home in Johannesburg surrounded by his family on Monday, 6 February 2017, at the age of 45. A public memorial service was scheduled for 10 February at Loftus Versfeld in Pretoria.

== See also ==
- List of South Africa national rugby union players – Springbok no. 593

Sporting positions
Preceded by Rassie Erasmus	Springbok Captain; 1999, 2003	Succeeded by André Vos
