= Henry Tromp =

South African rugby union player

- Born: 29 December 1966 (age 59) Otjiwarongo, South West Africa
- Height: 1.85 m (6 ft 1 in)
- Weight: 112 kg (247 lb)
- School: Klerksdorp High School

Rugby union career
- Position: Hooker
Provincial / State sides
Years	Team	Apps	(Points)
1988–1989	Northern Transvaal		
1990–1992	Western Transvaal		
1993	Natal		
1994–1997	Northern Transvaal		
International career
Years	Team	Apps	(Points)
1996	South Africa	4	(0)

Henry Tromp (born 29 December 1966) is a South African former rugby union player who played as a hooker.

== Playing career ==
Born in Otjiwarongo, South West Africa (now Namibia), Tromp made his provincial debut for Northern Transvaal in 1988, after which he moved to Western Transvaal in 1990 and to Natal in 1993. He returned to the Northern Transvaal in 1994 and remained with the union until his retirement.

Tromp made his test debut for South Africa in 1996 during the second test against New Zealand at Kings Park in Durban. He played a further three test matches in 1996, the third test against New Zealand and one test each against Argentina and France. He also played four tour matches, scoring one try for the Springboks.

== Conviction ==
In 1993, Tromp and his father were convicted of manslaughter after a labourer on their family farm died from injuries sustained in a "disciplinary" beating. The victim had allegedly stolen money from the Tromps, who tied him to a tree and took turns beating him with a fan belt. Tromp was sentenced to two years in prison but was released after six months.
