= Roberto Diego Grau =

Argentine rugby union player (born 1970)

- Born: 16 July 1970 (age 56) Mendoza, Argentina
- Height: 1.82 m (6 ft 0 in)
- Weight: 105 kg (16 st 7 lb)

Rugby union career
- Position: Prop
Senior career
Years	Team	Apps	(Points)
1988-1996	Liceo Rugby Club		
1996-1997	Golden Lions		
1997-2000	Saracens		
2000-2001	Dax		
2001-2003	Liceo Rugby Club		
- Correct as of 25 September 2007
International career
Years	Team	Apps	(Points)
1993-2003	Argentina	39	(10)
- Correct as of 25 September 2007

Roberto Diego Grau (born 16 July 1970 in Mendoza, Argentina) is a retired Argentine rugby union footballer and current coach. He played club rugby in Argentina, South Africa, France and England. He also represented the Argentina national rugby union team on 47 occasions, including appearances at the 1999 and 2003 Rugby World Cups.

Grau played for Liceo Rugby Club in Argentina, Golden Lions in South Africa, US Dax in France, Saracens in England. Starting from 2009, he coached U.R. Cuyo.
