= Dawie Theron =

South African rugby union footballer and coach

- Born: David François Theron; 15 September 1966 (age 60) Bloemfontein, Free State
- Height: 1.90 m (6 ft 3 in)
- Weight: 120 kg (265 lb)
- School: Sand du Plessis High School, Bloemfontein
- University: University of the Free State

Rugby union career
- Position(s): Tighthead prop, Loosehead prop
Amateur team(s)
Years	Team	Apps	(Points)
- Shimlas
–	Old–Greys		
–	De Beers		
Senior career
Years	Team	Apps	(Points)
1998–2000	Sale Sharks	30	(5)
Provincial / State sides
Years	Team	Apps	(Points)
1988–1994	Free State	61	
1995–2001	Griqualand West	114	
Super Rugby
Years	Team	Apps	(Points)
1998	Cats	9	
International career
Years	Team	Apps	(Points)
1996–1997	South Africa	13	
Coaching career
- Years: Team
- 2007–2010: Griquas
- 2011–2015: South Africa under-20
- 2016–2017: DoCoMo Red Hurricanes

David François Theron (born 15 September 1966) is a South African former rugby union player.

== Playing career ==
Theron represented the South Africa Universities under–19 and under–20 teams in 1986. He made his senior provincial debut for Free State in 1988 and in 1995 he joined Griqualand West.

He made his test debut for the Springboks as a replacement against Australia on 3 August 1996 at the Free State Stadium in Bloemfontein. His last test match was against New Zealand at Eden Park in Auckland. Theron played thirteen test matches and two tour matched for the Springboks.

=== Test history ===
No.	Opponents	Results (RSA 1st)	Position	Points	Dates	Venue
1.	Australia	25–19	Replacement		3 August 1996	Free State Stadium, Bloemfontein
2.	New Zealand	18–29	Replacement		10 August 1996	Newlands, Cape Town
3.	New Zealand	32–22	Loosehead prop		31 August 1996	Ellis Park, Johannesburg
4.	Argentina	46–15	Loosehead prop		9 November 1996	Ferro Carril Oeste, Buenos Aires
5.	Argentina	44–21	Loosehead prop		16 November 1996	Ferro Carril Oeste, Buenos Aires
6.	France	22–12	Loosehead prop		30 November 1996	Stade Chaban-Delmas, Bordeaux
7.	France	13–12	Loosehead prop		7 December 1996	Parc des Princes, Paris
8.	Wales	37–20	Loosehead prop		15 December 1996	Cardiff Arms Park, Cardiff
9.	British Lions	15–18	Replacement		28 June 1997	Kings Park, Durban
10.	(British & Irish Lions) British Lions	35–16	Tighthead prop		5 July 1997	Ellis Park, Johannesburg
11.	New Zealand	32–35	Replacement		19 July 1997	Ellis Park, Johannesburg
12.	Australia	20–32	Tighthead prop		2 August 1997	Suncorp Stadium, Brisbane
13.	New Zealand	35–55	Replacement		9 August 1997	Eden Park, Auckland

== Coaching career ==
Theron started his coaching career with Griquas in 2002 as an assistant to Swys de Bruin. He was appointed the Griquas head coach in 2007 and in 2011 he was appointment as the South Africa under-20 head coach. In 2016 and 2017, Theron was the head coach of the DoCoMo Red Hurricanes in Japan.

== See also ==
- List of South Africa national rugby union players – Springbok no. 633
