= Japie Mulder =

South African rugby union player

- Born: Jacobus Cornelius Mulder; 18 October 1969 (age 57) Springs, Gauteng, South Africa
- Height: 1.84 m (6 ft 1/2 in)
- Weight: 84 kg (13 st 3 lb; 185 lb)
- School: Hoërskool Hugenote, Springs, Gauteng
- University: Rand Afrikaans University

Rugby union career
- Position: Centre
Senior career
Years	Team	Apps	(Points)
2002	Yorkshire Carnegie	10	(15)
Provincial / State sides
Years	Team	Apps	(Points)
1991–2001	Transvaal /Golden Lions	113	
Super Rugby
Years	Team	Apps	(Points)
1998–2001	Cats		
International career
Years	Team	Apps	(Points)
1994–2001	South Africa	34	(35)

Jacobus Cornelius "Japie" Mulder (born 18 October 1969), is a former South African rugby union player who played for South Africa between 1994 and 2001.

== Career ==
=== Provincial ===
Mulder made his provincial debut for Transvaal in 1991 and continued to represent the union, whose name was changed to the Golden Lions, until 2001. In 1993 he was selected for the South African Barbarians to tour the United Kingdom and in 1994 he played for the South African A-team. He was a member of the Transvaal team that won the Currie Cup in 1993 and 1994, as well as the 1993 Super 10.

=== International ===
He played his first test match for the Springboks on 23 July 1994 against New Zealand at Athletic Park in Wellington. Mulder played in 34 test matches, including four during the 1995 Rugby World Cup. He also played in fifteen tour matches, scoring three tries, to add to his six test tries.

=== Test history ===
World Cup final

No.	Opposition	Result (SA 1st)	Position	Tries	Date	Venue
1.	New Zealand	9–13	Centre		23 Jul 1994	Athletic Park, Wellington
2.	New Zealand	18–18	Centre		6 Aug 1994	Eden Park, Auckland
3.	Scotland	34–10	Centre	1	19 Nov 1994	Murrayfield, Edinburgh
4.	Wales	20–12	Centre		26 Nov 1994	Cardiff Arms Park, Cardiff
5.	Samoa	60–8	Centre		13 Apr 1995	Ellis Park, Johannesburg
6.	Australia	27–18	Centre		25 May 1995	Newlands, Cape Town
7.	Samoa	42–14	Centre		10 Jun 1995	Ellis Park, Johannesburg
8.	France	19–15	Centre		17 Jun 1995	Kings Park, Durban
9.	New Zealand	15–12	Centre		24 Jun 1995	Ellis Park, Johannesburg
10.	Wales	40–11	Centre	1	2 Sep 1995	Ellis Park, Johannesburg
11.	Italy	40–21	Centre	1	12 Nov 1995	Stadio Olimpico, Rome
12.	England	24–14	Centre		18 Nov 1995	Twickenham, London
13.	Fiji	43–18	Centre	1	2 Jul 1996	Loftus Versfeld, Pretoria
14.	Australia	16–21	Centre		13 Jul 1996	Aussie Stadium, Sydney
15.	New Zealand	11–15	Centre		20 Jul 1996	AMI Stadium, Christchurch
16.	Australia	25–19	Centre		3 Aug 1996	Free State Stadium, Bloemfontein
17.	New Zealand	18–29	Centre	1	10 Aug 1996	Newlands, Cape Town
18.	New Zealand	32–22	Centre		31 Aug 1996	Ellis Park, Johannesburg
19.	Argentina	46–15	Centre		9 Nov 1996	Ferro Carril Oeste Stadium, Buenos Aires
20.	Argentina	44–21	Centre	1	16 Nov 1996	Ferro Carril Oeste Stadium, Buenos Aires
21.	France	22–12	Centre		30 Nov 1996	Stade Chaban-Delmas, Bordeaux
22.	France	13–12	Centre		7 Dec 1996	Parc des Princes, Paris
23.	Wales	37–20	Centre		15 Dec 1996	Cardiff Arms Park, Cardiff
24.	Tonga	74–10	Centre		10 Jun 1997	Newlands, Cape Town
25.	British Lions	16–25	Centre		21 Jun 1997	Newlands, Cape Town
26.	Italy	74–3	Substitute		12 Jun 1999	Boet Erasmus, Port Elizabeth
27.	Italy	101–0	Centre		19 Jun 1999	Kings Park, Durban
28.	Wales	19–29	Centre		26 Jun 1999	Millennium Stadium, Cardiff
29.	New Zealand	0–28	Centre		10 Jul 1999	Carisbrook, Dunedin
30.	Canada	51–18	Substitute		10 Jun 2000	Basil Kenyon Stadium, East London
31.	Australia	23–44	Centre		8 Jul 2000	Colonial Stadium, Melbourne
32.	England	17–25	Centre		2 Dec 2000	Twickenham, London
33.	France	23–32	Centre		16 Jun 2001	Ellispark, Johannesburg
34.	Italy	60–14	Centre		30 Jun 2001	Boet Erasmus, Port Elizabeth

=== World Cup ===
- 1995 : World Champions, 4 caps, (Wallabies, Samoa, France, All Blacks).

== Personal life ==
Mulder with three sons and one daughter, Jané a call-up to the BlitzBoks Women’s squad for the 2026 World Championship in Hong Kong.

He is now an employee of the telecommunications infrastructure company, Dark Fibre Africa (Pty) Ltd. In 2007 he pleaded guilty to the indecent assault and attempted rape of a South African schoolgirl who was the daughter of a close friend.

On 29 December 2009, Mulder and his wife and children were hijacked in the East Rand. Mulder was forced into the boot in the car, while his hijackers stole money from his bank account.

== See also ==
- List of South Africa national rugby union players – Springbok no. 617
