= Sebastián Irazoqui =

Argentine rugby union player (born 1969)

Sebastián L. Irazoqui (born 22 May 1969) is a former Argentine rugby union player. He played as a number eight.

Irazoqui played for Club Palermo Bajo, in Cordoba.

He had 8 caps for Argentina, from 1993 to 1995, scoring 1 try, 5 points on aggregate. He was called for the 1995 Rugby World Cup, playing in a single match.
