= Adrian Garvey =

Zimbabwean-born South African rugby union footballer

- Born: June 25, 1968 (age 58) Bulawayo, Rhodesia
- Height: 1.89 m (6 ft 2 1/2 in)
- Weight: 116 kg (256 lb; 18 st 4 lb)
- School: Plumtree School, Bulawayo

Rugby union career
- Position: Prop
Senior career
Years	Team	Apps	(Points)
1986–92	Old Miltonians RFC		
2000–03	Newport RFC	74	(55)
Provincial / State sides
Years	Team	Apps	(Points)
1992–99	Natal		
2000	Golden Lions		
Super Rugby
Years	Team	Apps	(Points)
1996–99	Sharks		
2000	Cats		
International career
Years	Team	Apps	(Points)
1990–1993	Zimbabwe	10	(8)
1996–1999	South Africa	28	(20)

Adrian Christopher Garvey (born 25 June 1968 in Bulawayo) is a former Rhodesian-born South African rugby union player. He played as a tighthead prop, and was known for his mobility and ball skills.

== Career ==
Garvey played 1st team rugby at Christian Brothers College [CBC],Bulawayo Zimbabwe and Plumtree High School in Zimbabwe and was selected for the Zimbabwe Schools team in 1986. During his senior career he played for Old Miltonians, Coastal Sharks, Natal and Newport RFC.

He is one of the few players to have competed at the Rugby World Cup for two countries. He had 10 caps for Zimbabwe, from 1990 to 1993, scoring 2 tries, 8 points in aggregate. He played three games at the 1991 Rugby World Cup, scoring two tries at the 51–12 loss to Scotland, on 9 October 1991.

He later became a South African naturalized citizen and decided to play for South Africa. He had 28 caps, from 1996 to 1999, scoring 4 tries, 20 points in aggregate. He played two times at the Tri Nations, being a member of the winning side in 1998. He was called for the 1999 Rugby World Cup, playing a single game in the 47–3 win over Spain, at Murrayfield, on 10 October 1999. That would be his last game for the Springboks.

=== Test history ===
Zimbabwe
No.	Opposition	Result (Zim 1st)	Position	Tries	Date	Venue
1.	Ivory Coast	22–9	Tighthead prop		5 May 1990	Police Grounds, Harare
2.	Morocco	16–0	Tighthead prop		8 May 1990	Police Grounds, Harare
3.	Ireland	11–55	Tighthead prop		6 Oct 1991	Lansdowne Road, Dublin
4.	Scotland	12–51	Tighthead prop	2	9 Oct 1991	Murrayfield, Edinburgh
5.	Japan	8–52	Tighthead prop		14 Oct 1991	Ravenhill Stadium, Belfast
6.	Wales	14–35	Tighthead prop		22 May 1993	Hartsfield, Bulawayo
7.	Wales	13–42	Tighthead prop		29 May 1993	Police Grounds, Harare
8.	Kenya	42–7	Tighthead prop		3 Jul 1993	RFUEA Ground, Nairobi
9.	Arabian Gulf	21–50	Tighthead prop		7 Jul 1993	RFUEA Ground, Nairobi
10.	Namibia	16–41	Tighthead prop		10 Jul 1993	RFUEA Ground, Nairobi
South Africa
No.	Opposition	Result (SA 1st)	Position	Tries	Date	Venue
1.	Argentina	46–15	Tighthead prop		9 Nov 1996	Ferro Carril Oeste, Buenos Aires
2.	Argentina	44–21	Tighthead prop		16 Nov 1996	Ferro Carril Oeste, Buenos Aires
3.	France	22–12	Tighthead prop		30 Nov 1996	Stade Chaban-Delmas, Bordeaux
4.	France	13–12	Tighthead prop		7 Dec 1996	Parc des Princes, Paris
5.	Wales	37–20	Tighthead prop		15 Dec 1996	Cardiff Arms Park, Cardiff
6.	Tonga	74–10	Tighthead prop	2	10 Jun 1997	Newlands, Cape Town
7.	British Lions	16–25	Tighthead prop		21 Jun 1997	Newlands, Cape Town
8.	British Lions	15–18	Tighthead prop		28 Jun 1997	Kings Park, Durban
9.	British Lions	35–16	Replacement		15 Jul 1997	Ellis Park, Johannesburg
10.	Australia	20–32	Replacement		2 Aug 1997	Suncorp Stadium, Brisbane
11.	Italy	61–31	Tighthead prop		8 Nov 1997	Dall'Ara Stadium, Bologna
12.	France	36–32	Tighthead prop		15 Nov 1997	Stade de Gerland, Lyon
13.	France	52–10	Tighthead prop		22 Nov 1997	Parc des Princes, Paris
14.	England	29–11	Tighthead prop	1	29 Nov 1997	Twickenham, London
15.	Scotland	68–10	Tighthead prop		6 Dec 1997	Murrayfield, Edinburgh
16.	Ireland	37–13	Tighthead prop		13 Jun 1998	Free State Stadium, Bloemfontein
17.	Ireland	33–0	Tighthead prop		20 Jun 1998	Loftus Versfeld, Pretoria
18.	Wales	96–13	Tighthead prop		27 Jun 1998	Loftus Versfeld, Pretoria
19.	England	18–0	Tighthead prop		4 Jul 1998	Newlands, Cape Town
20.	Australia	14–13	Tighthead prop		18 Jul 1998	Subiaco Oval, Perth
21.	New Zealand	13–3	Tighthead prop		25 Jul 1998	Athletic Park, Wellington
22.	New Zealand	24–23	Tighthead prop		15 Aug 1998	Kings Park, Durban
23.	Australia	29–15	Tighthead prop	1	22 Aug 1998	Ellis Park, Johannesburg
24.	Wales	28–20	Tighthead prop		14 Nov 1998	Wembley, London
25.	Scotland	35–10	Tighthead prop		21 Nov 1998	Murrayfield, Edinburgh
26.	Ireland	27–13	Tighthead prop		28 Nov 1998	Lansdowne Road, Dublin
27.	England	7–13	Tighthead prop		5 Dec 1998	Twickenham, London
28.	Spain	47–3	Tighthead prop		10 Oct 1999	Murrayfield, Edinburgh

== Miscellaneous ==
Garvey made the popular move from rugby to mountain biking after retiring from professional sport and participated in the 2011 Absa Cape Epic mountain bike stage race. He has also expressed a fondness for water and hydration.

== See also ==
- List of South Africa national rugby union players – Springbok no. 645
