= 2000 South Africa rugby union tour of Argentina, Britain and Ireland =

Summary
P	W	D	L
Total
9	6	0	3
Test match
4	3	0	1
Opponent
P	W	D	L
Argentina
1	1	0	0
Ireland
1	1	0	0
Wales
1	1	0	0
England
1	0	0	1

The 2000 South Africa rugby union tour of Argentina, Britain and Ireland was a series of matches played in November–December 2000 in Argentina, Britain and Ireland by South Africa national rugby union team.

At the same time, the "Under-23" South African selection made another tour playing with second tier countries.

== Springboks tour ==
'Scores and results list South Africa's points tally first.

Opposing Team	For	Against	Date	Venue	Status
Argentina A	32	21	8 November 2000	Tucuman	Tour match
Argentina	37	33	12 November 2000	Monumental, Buenos Aires	Test match
Ireland A	11	28	15 November 2000	Limerick, Limerick	Tour match
Ireland	28	18	19 November 2000	Lansdowne Road, Dublin	Test match
Wales A	34	15	22 November 2000	Arms Park, Cardiff	Tour match
Wales	23	13	26 November 2000	Millennium, Cardiff	Test match
National Division XV	30	35	28 November 2000	Sixways Stadium, Worcester	Tour match
England	17	25	2 December 2000	Twickenham, London	Test match
Barbarians	41	31	10 December 2000	Millennium, Cardiff	Tour match

== Under-23 tour ==
Scores and results list South Africa's points tally first.

Opposing Team	For	Against	Date	Venue	Status
Netherlands	100	10	29 November 2000	Amsterdam	Tour match
Portugal	36	15	3 December 2000	Lisbon	Tour match
Tunisia	47	15	7 December 2000	Tunis	Tour match
Morocco	44	14	16 December 2000	Casablanca	Tour match
