= Joel Stransky =

South Africa international rugby union player

- Born: Joel Theodore Stransky; 16 July 1967 (age 59) Johannesburg, South Africa
- Height: 1.79 m (5 ft 10 in)
- School: Maritzburg College
- University: University of Natal

Rugby union career
- Position: Fly-half
Amateur team(s)
Years	Team	Apps	(Points)
1988–1990	University of Pretoria		
–	University of Natal		
Senior career
Years	Team	Apps	(Points)
1991–1992	L'Aquila		
1992–1993	San Donà		
1997–1999	Leicester Tigers	73	(896)
Provincial / State sides
Years	Team	Apps	(Points)
1987–1993	Natal	78	(903)
1994–1996	Western Province	54	(518)
International career
Years	Team	Apps	(Points)
1993–1996	South Africa	22	(240)

Joel Theodore Stransky (born 16 July 1967) is a South African former rugby union player. A fly-half, he is known for scoring all of South Africa's points, including the winning drop goal, against New Zealand in the 1995 Rugby World Cup final.

== Early life ==
Stransky was born in Johannesburg, South Africa, to a family from England and Czechia. He was raised in Reform Judaism and had a bar mitzvah ceremony. He was educated at Maritzburg College where he was coached by Dave Dell, a well-known figure in schoolboy rugby. After his military conscription in Pretoria, he returned to Natal to study at the University of Natal.

== Playing career ==
Stransky was part of the Natal team that beat Northern Transvaal to win the Currie Cup for the first time in 1990. He then moved to Italy where he played for L'Aquila during the 1991–92 season, and for San Donà in 1992–93. Between 1993 and 1996, he won 22 caps for South Africa. He was part of the first South Africa team to play in a Rugby World Cup in 1995, the country had been banned from the previous World Cups because of the apartheid system. He played an integral part in the tournament and scored all 15 points for his team in the final against New Zealand, including a winning drop goal in the second period of extra time. This was the first Rugby World Cup final that went into extra time.

He moved to Leicester Tigers in 1997, where he played for two seasons, winning the 1996–97 Pilkington Cup and the 1998–99 Allied Dunbar Premiership, and then became backs coach. It was suggested that Stransky could play for England in the buildup to the 1999 Rugby World Cup, but he discovered that he was not qualified to do so. He played for the Czech Republic in a 1999 exhibition game against Penguin International RFC, scoring 17 points.

He was engaged by Bristol Rugby as a coach in 2002, but the offer was subsequently withdrawn. He took legal action and was compensated.

=== Test history ===
World Cup final

No.	Opposition	Result (SA 1st)	Position	Points	Date	Venue
1.	Australia	19–12	Fly-half		31 Jul 1993	Sydney Football Stadium (SFG), Sydney
2.	Australia	20–28	Fly-half	15 (1 try, 2 conversions, 2 penalties)	14 Aug 1993	Ballymore Stadium, Brisbane
3.	Australia	12–19	Fly-half	2 (1 conversion)	21 Aug 1993	Sydney Football Stadium (SFG), Sydney
4.	Argentina	29–26	Fly-half	9 (3 conversions, 1 penalty)	6 Nov 1993	Ferro Carril Oeste Stadium, Buenos Aires
5.	Argentina	42–22	Fly-half	22 (1 try, 4 conversions, 3 penalties)	8 Oct 1994	Boet Erasmus Stadium, Port Elizabeth
6.	Argentina	46–26	Fly-half	16 (1 try, 4 conversions, 1 penalty)	15 Oct 1994	Ellis Park, Johannesburg
7.	Samoa	60–8	Fly-half	7 (1 try, 1 conversion)	13 Apr 1995	Ellis Park, Johannesburg
8.	Australia	27–18	Fly-half	22 (1 try, 1 conversion, 4 penalties, 1 dropgoal)	25 May 1995	Newlands, Cape Town
9.	Romania	21–8	Replacement		30 May 1995	Newlands, Cape Town
10.	Canada	20–0	Fly-half	10 (2 conversions, 2 penalties)	3 Jun 1995	Boet Erasmus Stadium, Port Elizabeth
11.	France	19–15	Fly-half	14 (1 conversion, 4 penalties)	17 Jun 1995	Kings Park, Durban
12.	New Zealand	15–12	Fly-half	15 (3 penalties, 2 dropgoals)	24 Jun 1995	Ellis Park, Johannesburg
13.	Wales	40–11	Fly-half	15 (3 conversions, 3 penalties)	2 Sep 1995	Ellis Park, Johannesburg
14.	Italy	40–21	Fly-half	20 (4 conversions, 4 penalties)	12 Nov 1995	Stadio Olimpico, Rome
15.	England	24–14	Fly-half	9 (3 penalties)	18 Nov 1995	Twickenham, London
16.	Fiji	43–18	Replacement		2 Jul 1996	Loftus Versfeld, Pretoria
17.	New Zealand	11–15	Fly-half	6 (2 penalties)	20 Jul 1996	AMI Stadium, Christchurch
18.	Australia	25–19	Fly-half	25 (1 try, 1 conversion, 6 penalties)	3 Aug 1996	Free State Stadium, Bloemfontein
19.	New Zealand	18–29	Fly-half	8 (1 conversion, 2 penalties)	10 Aug 1996	Newlands, Cape Town
20.	New Zealand	19–23	Fly-half	14 (1 conversion, 4 penalties)	17 Aug 1996	Kings Park, Durban
21.	New Zealand	26–33	Fly-half	11 (1 conversion, 3 penalties)	24 Aug 1996	Loftus Versfeld, Pretoria
22.	New Zealand	32–22	Replacement		31 Aug 1996	Ellis Park, Johannesburg

== Later career ==
He later returned to South Africa, and is a part-time rugby union television colour commentator. He joined Altech Netstar (Pty) Ltd. in 2007 as sales and marketing director. He was later employed by the Steinhoff Group in a marketing and promotional capacity. He founded Pivotal Capital in 2012.

== Honours ==
At the South African Jewish Board of Deputies' 120th anniversary gala dinner in 2024, he was honoured among 100 remarkable Jewish South Africans who have contributed to South Africa. The ceremony included speeches from Chief Rabbi Ephraim Mirvis, and Stransky was honoured among other rugby union players, such as Fred Smollan, Cecil Moss, and Alan Menter.

=== Cultural depictions ===
He is portrayed by Scott Eastwood in the 2009 movie Invictus.

International Rugby Board awards

- World Rugby Hall of Fame Inductee Number 176: 2026

== See also ==
- List of select Jewish rugby union players
- List of South Africa national rugby union players – Springbok no. 592
