= Kobus Wiese =

South African rugby union footballer

- Born: Jakobus Johannes Wiese; 16 May 1964 (age 62) Paarl, South Africa
- Height: 1.99 m (6 ft 6 in)
- Weight: 125 kg (19 st 10 lb)
- School: Paarl Gimnasium

Rugby union career
Senior career
Years	Team	Apps	(Points)
- Petrarca Rugby
Provincial / State sides
Years	Team	Apps	(Points)
1985	Boland	12	
1986–1987	Western Transvaal	18	(4)
1988–1997	Transvaal /Golden Lions	128	(105)
Super Rugby
Years	Team	Apps	(Points)
1997	Gauteng Lions	8	(10)
1998	Cats	3	
International career
Years	Team	Apps	(Points)
1993–1996	South Africa	18	(5)

Official website
- https://twitter.com/4KobusWiese

Jakobus Johannes Wiese (born 16 May 1964) is a former South African rugby union player who played at lock for the South Africa national rugby union team between 1993 and 1996. He was a specialist number 2 jumper in the lineout, and rampant in the tight loose and loose. He is married and has two children.

== Playing career ==
=== Provincial ===
Wiese started his South African provincial career with Boland, after which he moved to Western Transvaal and finally to Transvaal, (later renamed the Golden Lions) in what is considered the strongest side ever fielded by the province. The 1993 side won the M-NET Night Series, Percy Frames Trophy, Super 10, Lion Cup and Currie Cup.

=== International ===
Wiese made his debut for the Springboks in the first test against France in 1993, which ended in a 20-all draw. He lost his test place after this, but was part of the touring squads to Australia in 1993, New Zealand in 1994 and Wales and Scotland at the end of 1994, before returning to the test team against Samoa before the 1995 World Cup. He was part of the winning squad of the 1995 Rugby World Cup.

He received a three-match ban for punching and knocking unconscious Derwyn Jones of Wales, after Jones slapped him in the face, in the 40–11 win in 1995. Jones was a major line out threat and was rendered unconscious and sidelined by a punch from behind in the fourth minute of the match. Wiese later scored a try in that match, but received a 30-day ban and a 50,000 Rand fine for his action.

He won his last cap for the Springboks on 15 December 1996 against Wales at Cardiff Arms Park in Cardiff. Wiese has the unique distinction of never playing in a losing Springbok side when he made the first XV.

=== Test history ===
World Cup final

No.	Opposition	Result (SA 1st)	Position	Tries	Date	Venue
1.	France	20–20	Lock		26 June 1993	Kings Park, Durban
2.	Samoa	60–8	Lock		13 April 1995	Ellis Park, Johannesburg
3.	Romania	21–8	Lock		30 May 1995	Newlands, Cape Town
4.	Canada	20–0	Lock		3 June 1995	Boet Erasmus Stadium, Port Elizabeth
5.	Samoa	42–14	Lock		10 June 1995	Ellis Park, Johannesburg
6.	France	19–15	Lock		17 June 1995	Kings Park, Durban
7.	New Zealand	15–12	Lock		24 June 1995	Ellis Park, Johannesburg
8.	Wales	40–11	Lock	1	2 September 1995	Ellis Park, Johannesburg
9.	Italy	40–21	Lock		12 November 1995	Stadio Olimpico, Rome
10.	England	24–14	Lock		18 November 1995	Twickenham, London
11.	New Zealand	19–23	Replacement		17 August 1996	Kings Park, Durban
12.	New Zealand	26–33	Replacement		24 August 1996	Loftus Versfeld, Pretoria
13.	New Zealand	32–22	Lock		31 August 1996	Ellis Park, Johannesburg
14.	Argentina	46–15	Lock		9 November 1996	Ferro Carril Oeste, Buenos Aires
15.	Argentina	44–21	Lock		16 November 1996	Ferro Carril Oeste, Buenos Aires
16.	France	22–12	Lock		30 November 1996	Stade Chaban-Delmas, Bordeaux
17.	France	13–12	Lock		7 December 1996	Parc des Princes, Paris
18.	Wales	37–20	Lock		15 December 1996	Cardiff Arms Park, Cardiff

== Honours ==
=== Province ===
- Winner of the Currie Cup 1993, 1994
- Finalist in the Currie Cup 1991, 1992
- Winner of Super 10 in 1993

=== World Cup ===
- 1995: World Champions, 5 selections (Romania, Canada, Samoa, France, All Blacks).

== Business career ==
Since 1994, Kobus and his wife Belinda Wiese have worked in the coffee industry. They began this business by joining a small group of coffee roasters dispersed widely across South Africa.

Kobus, who spotted a gap in the coffee industry, opened up shop in a small space on the East Rand. He then established Wiesenhof Coffee Shop in 1998, however he left the company's "The Roastery" at its core unaltered.

== Later career ==
He is also a consultant and TV sports presenter.

== See also ==
- List of South Africa national rugby union players – Springbok no. 585
