= Outline of South Africa =

Country in Southern Africa

The Flag of South Africa

The Coat of arms of South Africa

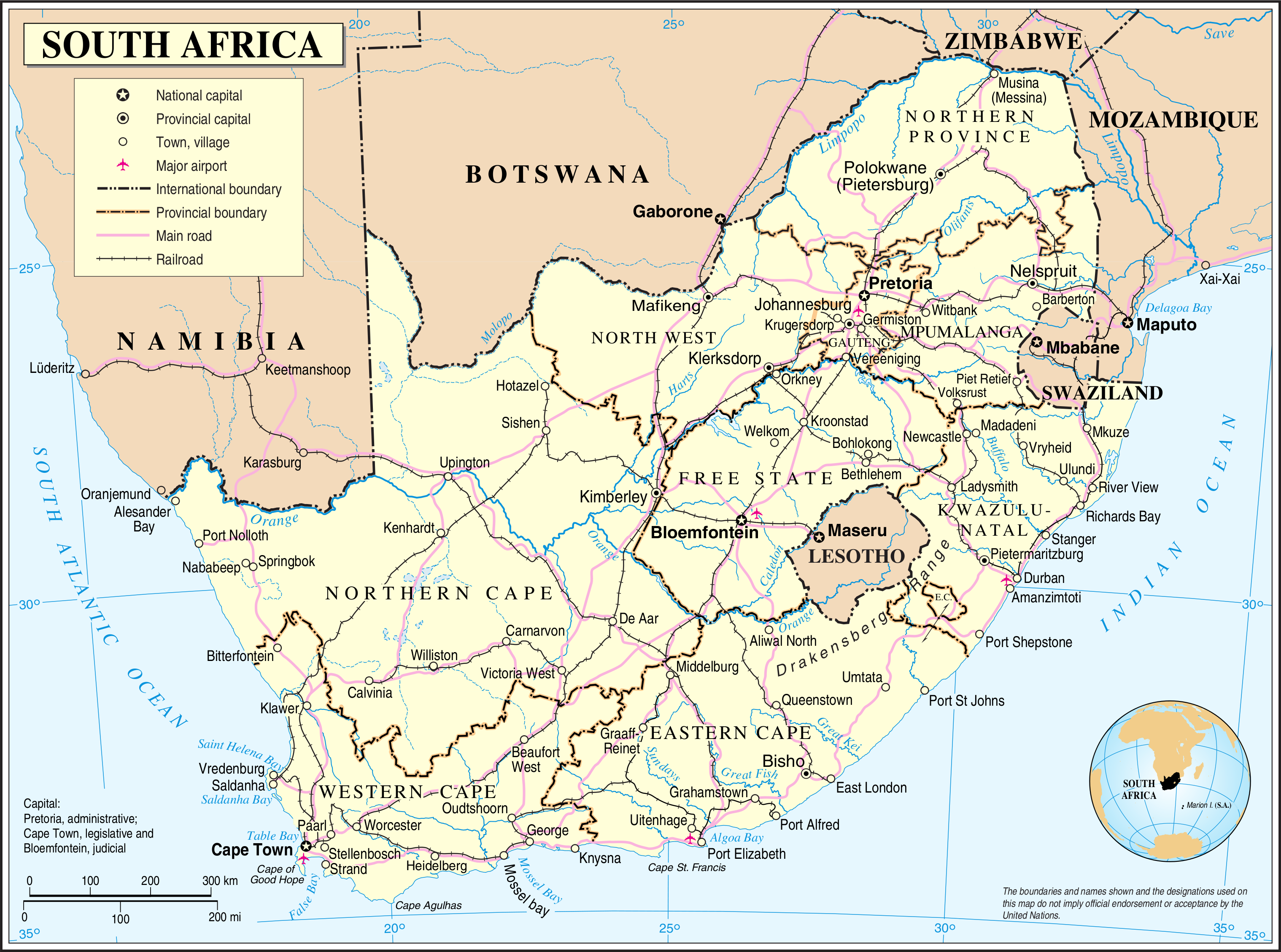
An enlargeable map of South Africa

The following outline is provided as an overview of and topical guide to South Africa:

South Africa – A sovereign country located at the southern tip of Africa. Its coast stretches 2,798 kilometres and borders both the Atlantic and Indian oceans. To the north of South Africa lie Namibia, Botswana, Zimbabwe, Mozambique and Eswatini (formerly Swaziland), while the Kingdom of Lesotho is an independent enclave surrounded by South African territory.

== General reference ==
An enlargeable basic map of South Africa

- Pronunciation: /saʊθ ˈæfrɪkə/
- Common English country name: South Africa
- Official English country name: The Republic of South Africa
- Common endonym(s): Aforika Borwa, Afrika Borwa, Afrika-Dzonga, Afurika Tshipembe, iNingizimu Afrika, iSewula Afrika, South Africa, Suid-Afrika, uMzantsi Afrika
- Official endonym(s): iRiphabhulikhi yeNingizimu Afrika, iRiphabhuliki yaseNingizimu Afrika, iRiphabliki yeSewula Afrika, iRiphabliki yomZantsi Afrika, Repabliki ya Afrika-Borwa, Rephaboliki ya Aforika Borwa, Rephaboliki ya Afrika Borwa, Republic of South Africa, Republiek van Suid-Afrika, Riphabliki ra Afrika Dzonga, Riphabuḽiki ya Afurika Tshipembe
- Adjectival(s): South African
- Demonym(s): South Africans
- ISO country codes: ZA, ZAF, 710
- ISO region codes: See ISO 3166-2:ZA
- Internet country code top-level domain: .za

== Geography of South Africa ==
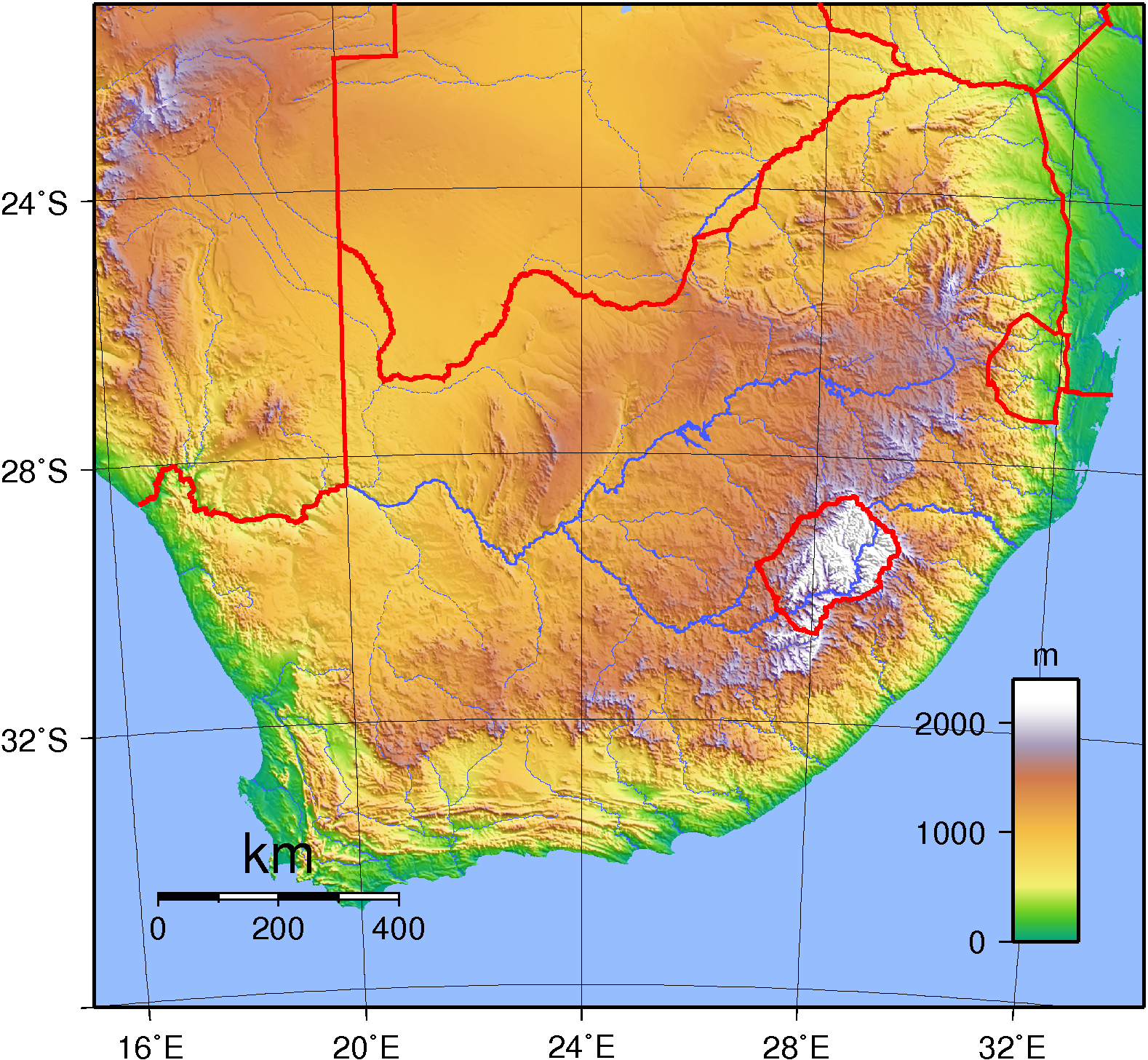
An enlargeable topographic map of South Africa

Geography of South Africa

- South Africa is: a megadiverse country
- Location:
  - Eastern Hemisphere and Southern Hemisphere
  - Africa
    - Southern Africa
  - Time zone: South African Standard Time (UTC+02)
  - Extreme points of South Africa
    - High: Mafadi 3,450 m (11,319 ft)
    - Low: South Atlantic Ocean and Indian Ocean 0 m
  - Land boundaries: 4,862 km

Botswana 1,840 km
Namibia 967 km
Lesotho 909 km
Mozambique 491 km
Eswatini 430 km
Zimbabwe 225 km

- Coastline: 2,798 km

- Population of South Africa: 57,725,600 (July 2018 estimate) - 23rd most populous country
- Area of South Africa: 1 221 037 km^{2}
- Atlas of South Africa

=== Environment of South Africa ===
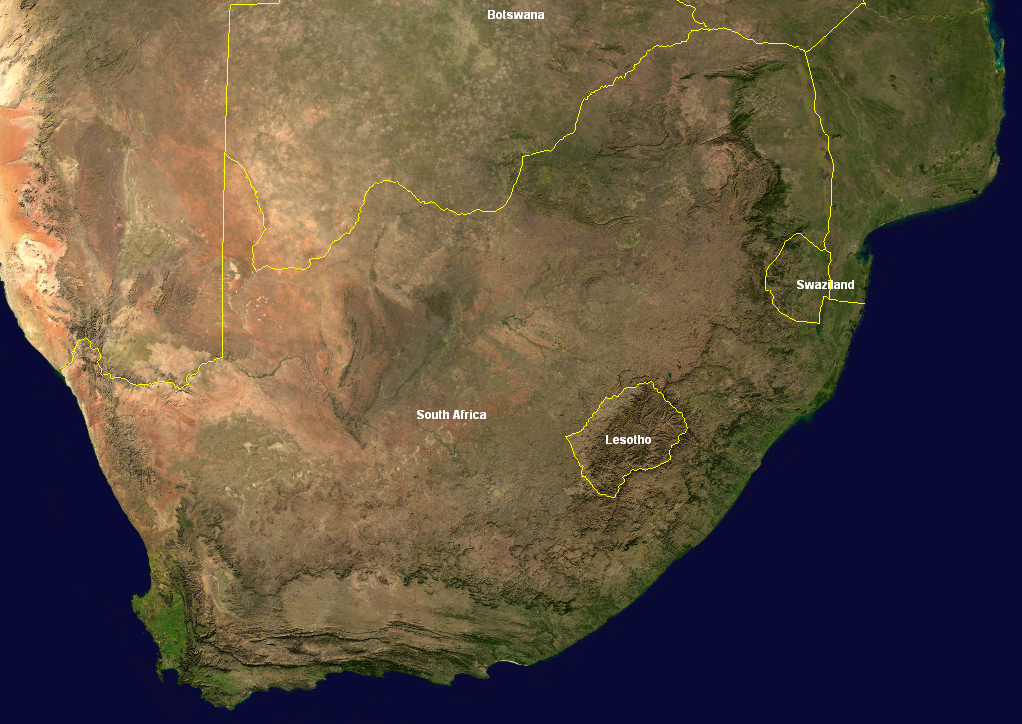
An enlargeable satellite image of South Africa

- Climate of South Africa
- Geology of South Africa
  - Marine geology of the Cape Peninsula and False Bay
- Green building in South Africa
- Ecoregions in South Africa
- Renewable energy in South Africa
- Protected areas of South Africa
  - Biosphere reserves in South Africa
  - National parks of South Africa
- Wildlife of South Africa
  - Flora of South Africa
    - List of Southern African indigenous trees
    - Fynbos
      - King protea
    - Veld
    - Clanwilliam cedar
    - Real yellowwood, the national tree
    - Rooibos
  - Fauna of South Africa
    - Birds of South Africa
    - Mammals of South Africa

==== Natural geographic features of South Africa ====
- Glaciers in South Africa: none
- Cape of Good Hope
- Deserts of South Africa
  - Kalahari Desert
- Estuaries of South Africa
- Islands of South Africa
- Forests of South Africa
- Lakes of South Africa
- Mountains of South Africa
  - Mountain ranges of South Africa
  - Mountain passes of South Africa
  - Specific mountains
    - Table Mountain
  - Volcanoes in South Africa
- Rivers of South Africa
  - Fish River
  - Orange River
  - Tugela River
  - Waterfalls of South Africa
    - Tugela Falls
- World Heritage Sites in South Africa

=== Regions of South Africa ===
==== Administrative divisions of South Africa ====
Administrative divisions of South Africa

- Provinces of South Africa
  - Districts of South Africa
    - Municipalities of South Africa

===== Provinces of South Africa =====
Provinces of South Africa

- Western Cape
- Northern Cape
- Eastern Cape
- KwaZulu-Natal
- Free State
- North West
- Gauteng
- Mpumalanga
- Limpopo

===== Districts of South Africa =====
Districts of South Africa

- City of Cape Town Metropolitan Municipality
- West Coast
- Cape Winelands
- Overberg
- Garden Route
- Central Karoo
- Nelson Mandela Bay Metropolitan Municipality
- Cacadu
- Amathole
- Chris Hani
- Joe Gqabi
- OR Tambo
- Alfred Nzo
- Xhariep
- Motheo
- Lejweleputswa
- Thabo Mofutsanyane
- Northern Free State
- Namakwa
- Pixley ka Seme
- Siyanda
- Frances Baard
- Kgalagadi
- Bojanala Platinum
- Ngaka Modiri Molema
- Dr Ruth Segomotsi Mompati
- Dr Kenneth Kaunda
- West Rand
- City of Johannesburg Metropolitan Municipality
- Sedibeng
- Ekurhuleni Metropolitan Municipality
- Metsweding
- City of Tshwane Metropolitan Municipality
- Mopani
- Vhembe
- Capricorn
- Waterberg
- Sekhukhune
- Gert Sibande
- Nkangala
- Ehlanzeni
- Amajuba
- Zululand
- Umkhanyakude
- uThungulu
- Umzinyathi
- Uthukela
- Umgungundlovu
- iLembe
- eThekwini Metropolitan Municipality
- Ugu
- Sisonke

===== Municipalities of South Africa =====
Municipalities of South Africa

- Capital of South Africa: Pretoria (executive), Bloemfontein (judicial) and Cape Town (legislative)
- Cities of South Africa
- Populated places in South Africa

=== Demography of South Africa ===
Demographics of South Africa

== Government and politics of South Africa ==
Politics of South Africa

- Form of government: unitary parliamentary representative democratic republic
- Capital of South Africa: Pretoria (executive), Bloemfontein (judicial) and Cape Town (legislative)
- Elections in South Africa
- Political parties in South Africa
- Social movements in South Africa
- Taxation in South Africa

=== Branches of the government of South Africa ===
Government of South Africa

==== Executive branch of the government of South Africa ====
- Head of state and head of government: President of South Africa, Cyril Ramaphosa
- Cabinet of South Africa

==== Legislative branch of the government of South Africa ====
- Parliament of South Africa (bicameral)
  - Upper house: National Council of Provinces
  - Lower house: National Assembly of South Africa

==== Judicial branch of the government of South Africa ====
- Constitutional Court of South Africa
  - Chief Justice of South Africa
- Supreme Court of Appeal of South Africa
- High Court of South Africa
- Magistrates' Courts of South Africa

=== Foreign relations of South Africa ===
Foreign relations of South Africa

- Diplomatic missions in South Africa
- Diplomatic missions of South Africa
- Immigration to South Africa

==== International organization membership ====
The Republic of South Africa is a member of:

- African, Caribbean, and Pacific Group of States (ACP)
- African Development Bank Group (AfDB)
- African Union (AU)
- African Union/United Nations Hybrid operation in Darfur (UNAMID)
- Bank for International Settlements (BIS)
- Commonwealth of Nations
- Food and Agriculture Organization (FAO)
- Group of 24 (G24)
- Group of 77 (G77)
- Group of Twenty Finance Ministers and Central Bank Governors (G20)
- International Atomic Energy Agency (IAEA)
- International Bank for Reconstruction and Development (IBRD)
- International Chamber of Commerce (ICC)
- International Civil Aviation Organization (ICAO)
- International Criminal Court (ICCt)
- International Criminal Police Organization (Interpol)
- International Development Association (IDA)
- International Federation of Red Cross and Red Crescent Societies (IFRCS)
- International Finance Corporation (IFC)
- International Fund for Agricultural Development (IFAD)
- International Hydrographic Organization (IHO)
- International Labour Organization (ILO)
- International Maritime Organization (IMO)
- International Mobile Satellite Organization (IMSO)
- International Monetary Fund (IMF)
- International Olympic Committee (IOC)
- International Organization for Migration (IOM)
- International Organization for Standardization (ISO)
- International Red Cross and Red Crescent Movement (ICRM)
- International Telecommunication Union (ITU)
- International Telecommunications Satellite Organization (ITSO)
- International Trade Union Confederation (ITUC)
- Inter-Parliamentary Union (IPU)
- Multilateral Investment Guarantee Agency (MIGA)
- Nonaligned Movement (NAM)
- Nuclear Suppliers Group (NSG)
- Organisation for the Prohibition of Chemical Weapons (OPCW)
- Permanent Court of Arbitration (PCA)
- Southern African Customs Union (SACU)
- Southern African Development Community (SADC)
- United Nations (UN)
- United Nations Conference on Trade and Development (UNCTAD)
- United Nations Educational, Scientific, and Cultural Organization (UNESCO)
- United Nations High Commissioner for Refugees (UNHCR)
- United Nations Industrial Development Organization (UNIDO)
- United Nations Institute for Training and Research (UNITAR)
- United Nations Organization Mission in the Democratic Republic of the Congo (MONUC)
- Universal Postal Union (UPU)
- World Confederation of Labour (WCL)
- World Customs Organization (WCO)
- World Federation of Trade Unions (WFTU)
- World Health Organization (WHO)
- World Intellectual Property Organization (WIPO)
- World Meteorological Organization (WMO)
- World Organization of the Scout Movement
- World Tourism Organization (UNWTO)
- World Trade Organization (WTO)
- World Veterans Federation
- Zangger Committee (ZC)

=== Law and order in South Africa ===
Law of South Africa

- Cannabis in South Africa
- Constitution of South Africa
- Crime in South Africa
  - Sexual violence in South Africa
- Human rights in South Africa
  - LGBT rights in South Africa
  - Freedom of religion in South Africa
- South African nationality law

==== Law enforcement in South Africa ====
Law enforcement in South Africa

- Department of Police
- South African Police Service
  - Crime Intelligence (SAPS)
  - South African Police Service Special Task Force
  - National Intervention Unit
  - Directorate for Priority Crime Investigation ( SAPS )
  - National Forensic DNA Database of South Africa
- Municipal Police
- Provincial Traffic Police
- National Prosecuting Authority
- Special Investigation Unit SIU
- Independent Complaints Directorate
- Department of Correctional Services
  - Capital punishment in South Africa
- Biometrics use by the South African government

=== Military of South Africa ===
Military of South Africa

- Command
  - Commander-in-chief: President of South Africa
    - Minister of Defence of South Africa
    - Department of Defence of South Africa
- South African National Defence Force
  - South African Air Force
  - South African Army
  - South African Navy
  - South African Military Health Service
  - South African Special Forces Brigade
  - South African Commando System
  - South African National Defence Force Intelligence Division
- Military history of South Africa
- Military ranks of South Africa

=== State security in South Africa ===
- State Security Agency
- Minister
- National Intelligence Co-ordinating Committee (NICC)
- National Intelligence Agency (NIA)
- National Communications Centre (NCC)
- Communications security (COMSEC)
- South African Secret Service (SASS)
- South African National Academy of Intelligence (SANAI)

=== Local government in South Africa ===
Local government in South Africa

== History of South Africa ==
History of South Africa

- South African History Project

=== Books on the history of South Africa ===
- The Cambridge History of South Africa
- The Oxford History of South Africa

=== History of South Africa, by period ===
- List of years in South Africa
- Early history of South Africa
- Jan van Riebeeck
- Xhosa Wars
- Mfecane
- Great Trek
- Zulu War (see also Anglo-Zulu War)
- History of Cape Colony
  - History of Cape Colony before 1806
- Orange Free State
- South African Republic
- Boer Wars
  - First Boer War
  - Second Boer War
  - Pretoria Convention
- Great Depression in South Africa
- Military history of South Africa during World War II
- Apartheid
  - History of apartheid
    - Sharpeville massacre
    - Rivonia Trial
    - Crime of Apartheid Convention (1973)
    - Other events related to apartheid
- South African Border War
- History of South Africa since 1994

=== History of South Africa, by region ===
- History of Johannesburg

=== History of South Africa, by subject ===
- History of the Cabinet of South Africa
- Earthquakes in South Africa
- Economic history of South Africa
- South African hacker history
- History of the Jews in South Africa
- LGBT history in South Africa
  - Timeline of LGBT history in South Africa
- History of libraries in South Africa
- South African locomotive history
- Military history of South Africa
  - History of the South African Air Force
  - Military history of South Africa during World War II
- History of South African nationality
- Postage stamps and postal history of South Africa
- Social movements in South Africa
- History of South African wine
- History of women's rights in South Africa

== Culture of South Africa ==
Culture of South Africa

- Architecture of South Africa
  - Cape Dutch architecture
- Cuisine of South Africa
  - South African wine
- Feminism in South Africa
- Gambling in South Africa
- South African heraldry
- Media in South Africa
- National symbols of South Africa
  - Coat of arms of South Africa
  - Flag of South Africa
  - National anthem of South Africa
  - National flower of South Africa
- Prostitution in South Africa
- Public holidays in South Africa
- Racism in South Africa
- Scouts South Africa
- World Heritage Sites in South Africa
- Xenophobia in South Africa
- Afrikaner Calvinism
- Kwaito
- Ladysmith Black Mambazo
- Nguni stick fighting
- Khoikhoi mythology

=== Art in South Africa ===
- Architecture of South Africa
- Art of South Africa
  - List of South African artists
- Cinema of South Africa
- Literature of South Africa
  - List of South African poets
  - List of Afrikaans language poets
- Media in South Africa
- Music of South Africa
- Television in South Africa

== Language in South Africa ==
- Click consonant
- Languages of South Africa
  - Afrikaans language
  - English language (South African English)
  - Nguni languages
    - Southern Ndebele language (isiNdebele)
    - Swati language (siSwati)
    - Xhosa language (isiXhosa)
    - Zulu language (isiZulu)
  - Sotho languages
    - Sotho language (Sesotho)
    - Northern Sotho language (Sesotho sa Leboa)
    - Tswana language (Setswana)
  - Venda language (Tshivenda)
  - Tsonga language (Xitsonga)
  - !Xu language
  - Bantu languages
  - Khoisan languages
- List of South African slang words

== People of South Africa ==
People of South Africa

- Ethnic groups in South Africa
  - Asian South African
    - Indian South African
    - Chinese South African
  - Bantu peoples
    - Basotho
      - Bakoena
      - Bataung
      - Batlokoa
    - South Ndebele people
    - Pedi people
    - Sotho people
    - Swazi people
    - Tsonga people
    - Tswana people
    - Venda people
      - Venda
    - Xhosa people
    - Zulu people
  - Coloureds
    - Cape Coloured
    - Cape Malay
    - Griqua people
  - Khoisan
  - White South African
    - Afrikaner
    - British diaspora in South Africa
    - Jewish South Africans
- Homeless in South Africa

=== Specific persons ===
- Neil Aggett
- Tatamkulu Afrika
- Autshumao
- Steve Biko
- Arthur Blaxall
- Pieter Willem Botha
- J. M. Coetzee
- Mahatma Gandhi
- Frederik Willem de Klerk
- Krotoa
- Paul Kruger
- Winnie Madikizela-Mandela
- Nelson Mandela
- Mark Mathabane
- Govan Mbeki
- Thabo Mbeki
- Lilian Ngoyi
- Raymond Mhlaba
- Patrice Motsepe
- Harry Oppenheimer
- Jan van Riebeeck
- Charles Robberts Swart
- Shaka Zulu
- Walter Sisulu
- J.G. Strijdom
- Charles Robberts Swart
- Oliver Tambo
- Desmond Tutu
- B.J. Vorster
- J.R.R. Tolkien
- Jacob Zuma

=== Religion in South Africa ===
Religion in South Africa

- Buddhism in South Africa
- Christianity in South Africa
  - Roman Catholicism in South Africa
  - Protestantism in South Africa
- Hinduism in South Africa
- Islam in South Africa
- Judaism in South Africa

== Sports in South Africa ==
Sport in South Africa

- Cape Unicorns Polocrosse Club
- Football in South Africa
- Cricket in South Africa
  - History of cricket in South Africa
    - History of cricket in South Africa to 1918
    - History of cricket in South Africa from 1918–19 to 1945
    - History of cricket in South Africa from 1945–46 to 1970
    - History of cricket in South Africa from 1970–71 to 1990
    - History of cricket in South Africa from 1990–91 to 2000
    - History of cricket in South Africa from 2000–01
- South Africa at the Olympics

=== Rugby in South Africa ===
- South Africa at the Rugby World Cup
- South African Rugby Board
- South African Rugby Legends Association
- South African Rugby Football Federation
- Rugby league in South Africa
  - South African Rugby League
    - South Africa national rugby league team
  - History of rugby league in South Africa
    - History of the South Africa national rugby league team
- Rugby sevens in South Africa
  - South Africa national rugby sevens team
    - List of South Africa national rugby sevens players
  - South Africa women's national rugby sevens team
  - South Africa at the World Rugby Sevens Series
- Rugby union in South Africa
  - South African Rugby Union
  - South African rugby union captains
  - List of South Africa national rugby union players
  - South African rugby union teams
    - South Africa national rugby union team
      - South Africa national rugby union team players
      - List of South Africa national rugby union team records
    - South Africa national under-18 rugby union team
    - South Africa national under-20 rugby union team
      - List of South Africa national under-20 rugby union team players
    - South Africa 'A' national rugby union team
    - South Africa amateur national rugby union team
    - South African Universities rugby union team
    - South Africa women's national rugby union team
  - History of rugby union in South Africa
    - History of the South Africa national rugby union team
    - History of rugby union matches between Argentina and South Africa
    - History of rugby union matches between Australia and South Africa
    - History of rugby union matches between England and South Africa
    - History of rugby union matches between France and South Africa
    - History of rugby union matches between Ireland and South Africa
    - History of rugby union matches between Italy and South Africa
    - History of rugby union matches between New Zealand and South Africa
    - History of rugby union matches between Samoa and South Africa
    - History of rugby union matches between Scotland and South Africa
    - History of rugby union matches between South Africa and Wales
    - History of rugby union matches between South Africa and the Barbarians
    - History of rugby union matches between South Africa and the British & Irish Lions

== Economy and infrastructure of South Africa ==
Economy of South Africa

- Economic rank, by nominal GDP (2007): 30th (thirtieth)
- Agriculture in South Africa
- Banking in South Africa
  - South African Reserve Bank
- Communications in South Africa
  - Media in South Africa
  - Telecommunications in South Africa
    - Internet in South Africa
    - Television in South Africa
    - List of radio stations in South Africa
    - South African Broadcasting Corporation (SABC)
- Companies of South Africa
- Currency of South Africa: Rand
  - Financial rand (abolished)
  - ISO 4217: ZAR
- Economic history of South Africa
- Energy in South Africa
- Foreign trade of South Africa
- Gambling in South Africa
- Housing in South Africa
  - Homelessness in South Africa
- Mining in South Africa
  - Iron ore in South Africa
  - Platinum in South Africa
  - Titanium in South Africa
- Johannesburg Stock Exchange
- Taxation in South Africa
- Tourism in South Africa
- Trade unions in South Africa
- Transport in South Africa
  - Airports in South Africa
  - Rail transport in South Africa
- Water supply and sanitation in South Africa

=== Companies in South Africa ===
- Anglo American
- BHP
- Eskom
- Etruscan Resources
- Kumba Resources
- List of radio stations in South Africa
- Murray & Roberts
- Mvelaphanda Group
- Richards Bay Minerals RBM
- Sasol
- South African Airways (SAA)
- Standard Bank of South Africa
- Telkom (South Africa)
- Transnet
  - Blue Train (South Africa)
  - Freightdynamics
  - Petronet
  - Protekon
  - Shosholoza Meyl
  - South African Port Operations SAPO
  - Transnet Engineering
  - Transnet Freight Rail

== Education in South Africa ==
Education in South Africa

- List of universities in South Africa
- University of the Witwatersrand
- University of the Western Cape
- University of KwaZulu-Natal
- University of Johannesburg
- University of Fort Hare
- University of Cape Town
- University of South Africa
- University of Zululand
- University of Pretoria
- University of Stellenbosch
- Rhodes University
- North-West University

National Qualifications Framework

- South African Qualifications Authority

== Health in South Africa ==
- Health in South Africa
- Healthcare in South Africa
  - Midwives in South Africa
- HIV/AIDS in South Africa

== See also ==
South Africa

- List of international rankings
- Member state of the Commonwealth of Nations
- Member state of the Group of Twenty Finance Ministers and Central Bank Governors
- Member state of the United Nations
- Outline of Africa
- Outline of geography

Southern Ndebele language
