= Christmas in South Africa =

Christmas in South Africa may refer to:

- Christmas as it is celebrated in South Africa
- "Christmas in South Africa", an episode of the television series Teletubbies

== See also ==
- Christmas (disambiguation)
- South Africa (disambiguation)
