= Jo Farah =

South African entrepreneur

- Born: Joseph Farah
- Citizenship: South African
- Occupations: Entrepreneur, Business Executive

Joseph "Jo" Farah is a South African business executive and entrepreneur.

He is the founder and CEO of The Lab (formerly known as Sneaker LAB), an international fashion care company, the founder of GoodBasics, a biotechnology-focused home care brand, and the co-founder of the sports technology company, EXO.

== Early life and career ==
Farah was born and raised in Johannesburg, South Africa. He later went to the United States and came back to South Africa in 2008.

Before establishing The Lab, Farah worked in marketing related to the footwear and streetwear sectors.

== Business career ==
=== Sneaker LAB and The Lab ===
Farah founded Sneaker LAB in Cape Town in 2012, targeting the global footwear and streetwear market. While developing the company's products, Farah investigated alternatives to conventional cleaning chemicals. In 2026, Sneaker LAB rebranded as The Lab, reflecting its wider positioning as a fashion care brand.

=== GoodBasics ===
Farah later founded GoodBasics, a home-care brand that applies probiotic technology to household cleaning.

=== EXO ===
He is also the founder of EXO, a sports technology company developing products based on a material platform referred to as Zyntech. EXO was created by Farah along with Paul Farah, Dan Nash, and sports technology developer Luc Bouckaert.

== Recognition ==
In 2020, Farah was named among the Top 50 entrepreneurs in Africa's Business Heroes, the entrepreneurship programme associated with the Jack Ma Foundation. The programme's official finalist records list Joseph Farah - Sneaker LAB among the 2020 Top 50.
