= Ian McIntosh =

- Born: 24 September 1938 Bulawayo, Matabeleland, Southern Rhodesia (now Zimbabwe)
- Died: 5 April 2023 (aged 84) uMhlanga, KwaZulu-Natal, South Africa

Rugby union career
Coaching career
- Years: Team
- 1993–94: South Africa
- –: Zimbabwe
- –: Sharks (Currie Cup)

Ian McIntosh (24 September 1938 – 5 April 2023) was a Zimbabwean–South African rugby union coach. He served as head coach for the Springboks during 1993 and 1994.

McIntosh grew up near Bulawayo in Matabeleland, Southern Rhodesia (now Zimbabwe).

McIntosh never played for his country (Rhodesian national rugby union team) as a player, but became acquainted with coaching in the 1970s under the tutelage of the then Welsh Rugby Union coaching director Ray Williams.

When his coaching career ended, McIntosh was a Springbok selector for 13 years and he also served as a mentor for numerous South African national coaches in the senior and junior ranks. He also stayed in touch with the game through his involvement with the South African Rugby Legends Association (SARLA).

In 2013 Ian McIntosh became the first South African and the first Durban North resident to win the IRB's Vernon Pugh Award for Distinguished Service, recognising his achievement in changing the face of rugby in South Africa.

McIntosh died from cancer on 5 April 2023, at the age of 84.

== Teams coached ==
=== Natal rugby and the Sharks ===
McIntosh coached the Natal team during the late 1980s and early 1990s. He became a national figure after Natal won their first Currie Cup in 1990, their centenary year. He followed this up with further titles in 1992, 1995 and 1996, making him a four-time Currie Cup winner as coach.

The Sharks named their main entrance gate at Kings Park after McIntosh.

=== National ===
His success with Natal led to him coaching the Springbok side from 1993 to 1994, taking charge of his first test match against France at King's Park on 26 June 1993. The match ended in a 20–20 draw, and also marked the debut of future World Cup winning captain Francois Pienaar.

In total, McIntosh coached the Springboks in 12 test matches, winning 4, losing 6 and drawing 2.

He was sacked as Springbok coach the year before the 1995 World Cup, following an unsuccessful tour of New Zealand that brought a 2-0 series defeat to the All Blacks in New Zealand. In October 1994, Kitch Christie accepted an offer to take over from McIntosh.

== In popular culture ==
The Ian McIntosh Story is a Supersport documentary available on Showmax. Described as: "In bestowing the prestigious Vernon Pugh Award for Distinguished Service in 2013, World Rugby lauded Ian for his outstanding coaching and management, this is his story".

Sporting positions
| Preceded by (South Africa) John Williams | South Africa National Rugby Union Coach; 1993–1994 | Succeeded by (South Africa) Kitch Christie |
