= History of the South Africa national rugby union team =

The history of the South Africa national rugby union team dates back to 1891, when the British Lions first toured South Africa where they played against South African representative sides. The South Africa national rugby union team played few international matches during a period of international sanctions due to apartheid. Since the end of apartheid in 1994, South Africa has once again fully participated in international rugby.

The most iconic moment in South Africa rugby history is when South Africa hosted and won the 1995 Rugby World Cup, with Nelson Mandela presenting the trophy to the team. As of 2023, South Africa have won a record four Rugby World Cups (2007, 2019, 2023). Siya Kolisi became the second captain to win two Rugby World Cups in 2023, when South Africa defeated their traditional rivals, the All Blacks, in the final.

== First internationals ==
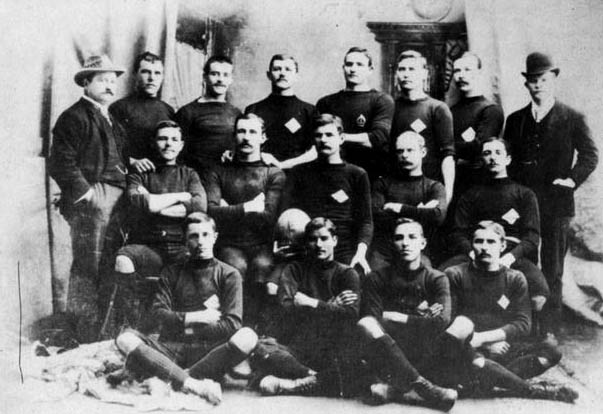
The South Africa team that played the second test v the British Isles in 1891

The first British Isles tour took place in 1891, with the trip financially underwritten by Cape Colony Prime Minister Cecil Rhodes. These were the first representative games played by South African sides, who were still learning the game. The tourists played and won a total of twenty matches, conceding only one point in the process. South Africa's first Tests were played, although South Africa did not exist as political unit until 1910. In a notable event of the tour, the British side presented the Currie Cup to Griqualand West, the province they thought produced the best performance on the tour.

The British Isles' success continued on their 21-game tour of 1896. The British Isles won three out of the four Tests against South Africa. South Africa's play improved markedly from 1891. Their forwards were particularly impressive, and their first Test win in the final game was a pointer to the future. For the first time South Africa had worn myrtle green shirts, which their captain, Barry Heatlie, borrowed from his Old Diocesans club. Rugby was given a huge boost by the early Lions tours, which created great interest in the South African press.

Rugby was so popular that in 1902 there was a temporary ceasefire in the Second Boer War so that a game could be played between British and Boer forces. (Note: Accepted proof from a letter from Field General S. G. Maritz of Transvaal Scouting Corps. to a Major Edwards dated 28 April 1902 informing of an agreed cease-fire from noon until sunset on 29 April to allow a game of rugby union to take place. The original letter is kept at the South Africa Rugby Board Museum.) The game had spread among the Afrikaner population through POW games during the Boer War, and afterwards Stellenbosch University became a training ground for future players and administrators.

In 1903 the British Isles lost a series for the first time in South Africa, drawing the opening two Tests before losing the last 8–0. In all, the tourists won just 11 of their 22 tour games. By contrast, South Africa would not lose another series—home or away—until 1956.

== Springboks ==
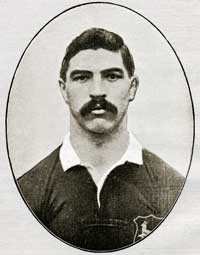
Paul Roos, Springbok captain of the team that toured the British Isles in 1906.

Paul Roos was the captain of the first South African team to tour the British Isles and France. The team was largely dominated by players from Western Province, and the tour took place during 1906–07. The team played 29 matches; including tests against all four Home Nations. England managed a draw, but Scotland was the only one of the Home unions to gain a victory.

During this tour the nickname Springboks was first used. There is often confusion as to the springbok symbol being worn before the name was invented, but this may be down to the fact the tour manager, J.C. Carden, spoke of having no 'uniforms or blazers' with the icon, though he did not appear to mean the jerseys. It was reported in the Daily Mail on 20 September 1906, seven days before the first match, that 'The team's colours will be myrtle green with gold collar... and will have embroidered in mouse-coloured silk on the left breast a Springbok'. Carden later stated:

...No uniforms or blazers had been provided... That night I spoke to Roos and Carolin and pointed out that the witty London Press would invent some funny name for us if we did not invent one ourselves. We thereupon agreed to call ourselves Springboks and to tell Pressmen that we desired to be so named. I remember this distinctly, for Paul (Roos) reminded us that "Springbokken" was the correct plural. However, the Daily Mail, after our first practice, called us the Springboks and the name stuck. I at once ordered the dark green, gold-edged blazers...

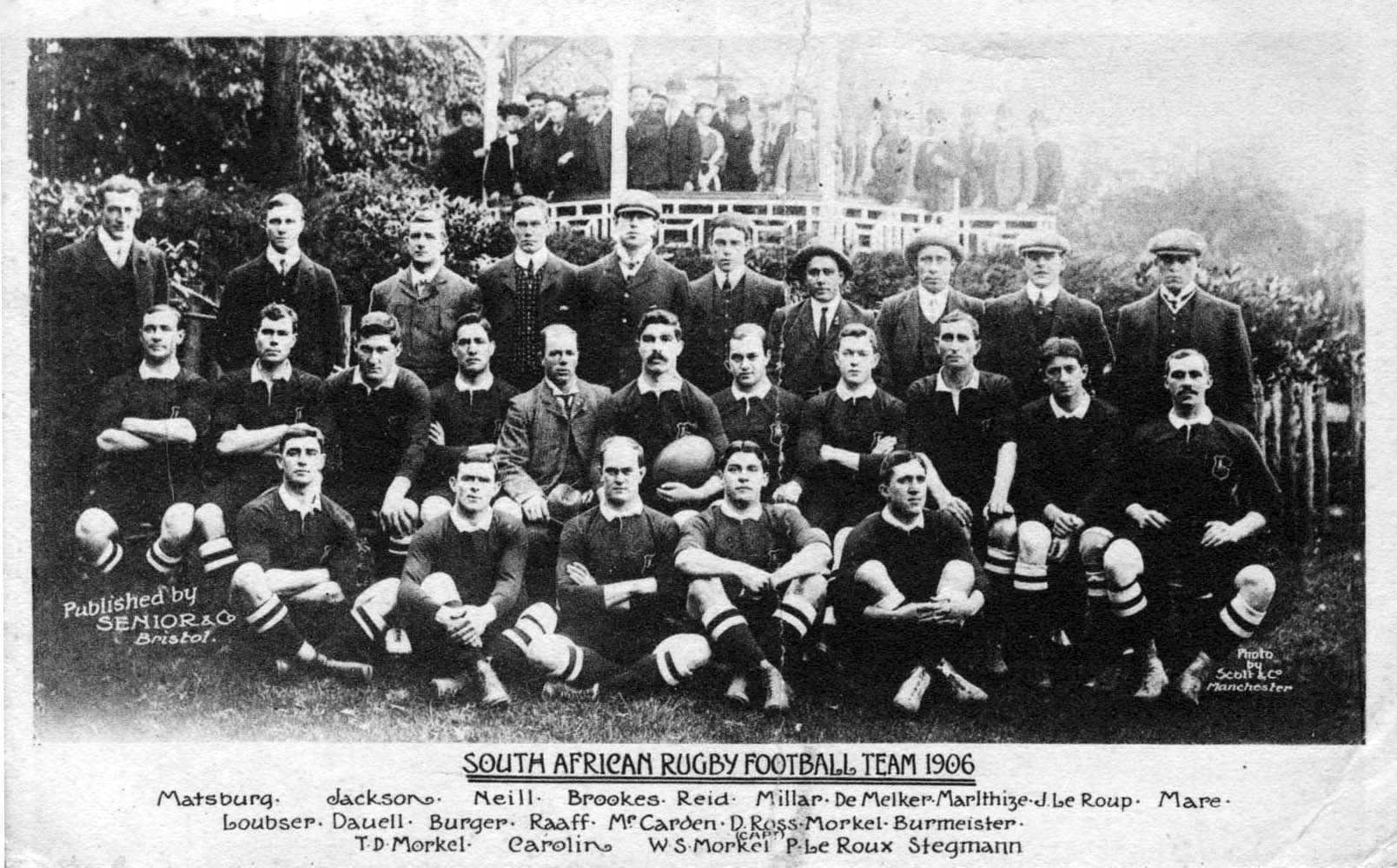
The 1906 Springboks team.

Newspaper reporters were to call the team "De Springbokken", and later the Daily Mail printed an article referring to the "Springboks". The team thereafter wore blazers with a springbok on the left breast pocket. Research in 1992 showed that the design for a Springbok head which was used on the cap as well as the jumping Springbok for use on the jersey and blazer was designed by a German-born artist Heinrich Egersdörfer, living at the time in Woodstock, Cape Town.

Historically the term 'Springbok' was applied to any team or individual representing South Africa in international competition regardless of sporting discipline. This tradition was abandoned with the advent of South Africa's new democratic government in 1994. The trip helped heal wounds after the Boer War and instilled a sense of national pride among South Africans.

The South Africans crossed the channel to play an unofficial match against a 'France' team drawn from the two Parisian clubs: Stade Français and Racing Club de France. The official French team were in England at the time. The Springboks won 55–6 and scored 13 tries in the process.

The 1910 British Isles tour of South Africa was the first to include representatives from all four Home unions. The team performed moderately against the non-test parties, claiming victories in just over half their matches. The tourists won just one of their three Tests.

The Boks' second European tour took place in 1912–13. They beat the four Home nations to earn their first Grand Slam and also went on to defeat France.

== Inter war ==
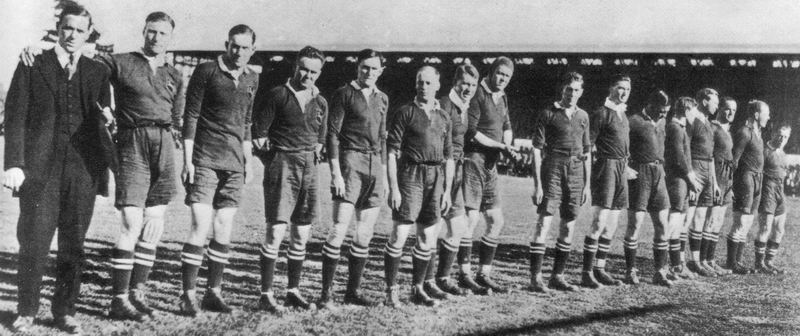
The Springboks team that faced New Zealand in 1921.

By the first World War New Zealand and South Africa had established themselves as rugby's two greatest powers. (Note: The All Blacks had first played Test rugby in 1903, and toured the British Isles in 1905. By 1921 they had won 19 Tests, drawn two and lost three.) A New Zealand Army match tour of South Africa in 1919 paved the way for a Springbok tour to New Zealand and Australia in 1921. The tour was billed as "The World Championship of Rugby". The All Blacks won the first Test 13–5, which included a try by All Blacks winger Jack Steel who had sprinted 50 metres with the ball trapped between his right hand and back to score. The Springboks recovered to win the second Test 9–5 thanks to a Gerhard Morkel drop-goal. The final Test was drawn 0–0 after being played in terrible conditions—resulting in a series draw.

The 1924 British and Irish Lions team to South Africa struggled with injuries and won only nine of 21 games. They lost three Tests to the Springboks, drew one, but despite the results, the tour produced some attractive rugby. This was the first side to pick up the name Lions, apparently picked up from the Lions embroidered on their ties.

The All Blacks first toured South Africa in 1928, and again the Test series finished level. Despite playing most of the second half with only 14 men, with a dominant scrum and fly-half Bennie Osler, the Springboks won the first Test 17–0 to inflict the All Blacks' heaviest defeat since 1893. The All Blacks rebounded to win the second Test 7–6. After a Springbok win in the third Test, the Springboks needed to win the fourth to secure a series victory. The New Zealanders bought back Mark Nicholls for his only Test of the series, and their captain Maurice Brownlie told the team a week before the Test that "Under no circumstances whatever is anyone of you so much as to touch a rugby ball until we play the Springboks in the last test." Their tactics were successful and the All Blacks won 13–5 to draw the series.

Despite winning South Africa's second Grand Slam, the Springbok tourists of 1931–32 were an unloved team. They had a jumbo pack and a kicking fly-half in captain Bennie Osler. Their tactics of kicking for territory earned them criticism both in South Africa and abroad. It was successful however, the team winning against England, Ireland, Scotland and Wales, as well as defeating all their Welsh opponents for the first time.

In 1933, Wallabies made a tour in South Africa, After five match, Springboks won the series against Australian (3–2), confirmed themself as the strongest team in the world.

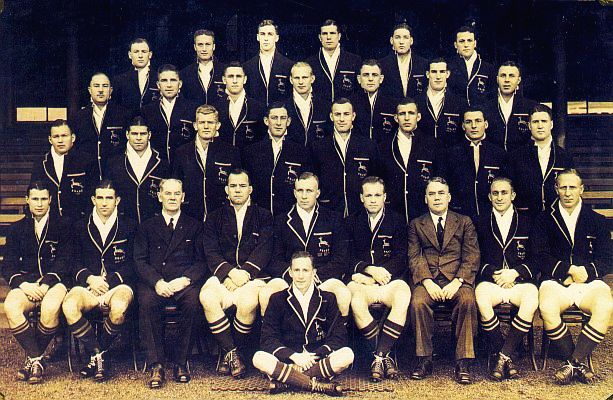
The complete squad that toured New Zealand and Australia in 1937.

In 1937 South Africa toured New Zealand and Australia and broke the deadlock with a series win in New Zealand. Their 2–1 series win prompted them to be called "the best team to ever leave New Zealand". Despite the All Blacks winning the first Test, the Springboks' won in the third Test 17–6 and scored five tries to none. The All Blacks' loss was considered a humiliation in New Zealand.

The British Isles toured South Africa again in 1938, winning the majority of their tour matches. However, the Springboks secured easy victories in the first two tests, winning 26–12 and 19–3. However, the Lions bounced back to record a 21–16 win in the third test, which was the first Lions win on South Africa soil since 1910.

== Post-war era ==
Danie Craven was appointed coach in 1949, and started his coaching career with a bang. The Springboks won ten matches in a row, including a 4–0 whitewash of New Zealand on their 1949 tour to South Africa.(details of this referencerequired) Prop Okey Geffin helped kick the Springboks to victory—they won all four Tests despite the All Blacks scoring more tries in three of them.

The 1951–52 team that toured Europe was considered amongst the finest Springbok sides to tour. The team won the Grand Slam as well as defeating France. Hennie Muller captained the side after original captain Basil Kenyon suffered a serious eye injury. The South African highlight of the tour was a 44–0 defeat of Scotland. The defeat of Scotland included nine tries, and was a record at the time. (Note: Under the modern scoring system it would have been a 62–0 defeat.) The team finished with only one loss, to London Counties, from 31 matches.

In 1953, Australia toured South Africa for the second time and although they lost the series they were given a standing ovation after defeating South Africa 18–14 in a thrilling 2nd Test at Newlands. Wallaby Captain John Solomon was chaired off the field by two South African players. This was the first Springbok defeat for 15 years. During their 1955 tour to South Africa, the Lions won 19 and drew one from the 25 fixtures. The four-test series ended in a draw.

In 1956, Springboks toured Australasia the All Blacks won its first series over the Springboks, in what Chris Hewett called "in the most bitterly fought series in history." Surprise selection Don Clarke from Waikato—nicknamed the Boot—kicked the decisive penalties in the final Tests.

South Africa had defeated France 25–3 at Colombes Stadium in 1952, and when France toured South Africa in 1958 they were not expected to compete. Georges Duthen described the mood of the French players before their first Test in 1958: "They were going into battle. A Battle for France. And they hadn't a hope..." France exceeded expectations and drew 3–3 with after a drop goal to French scrum-half Pierre Danos and unconverted try to South Africa's Butch Lochner. The French then secured a Test series victory in South Africa with their 9–5 victory in front of 90,000 spectators in Johannesburg. The French feared the South African forwards, especially their scrum, and focused much of their training before the series on improving the "South African" style of their forwards. The decisive moment of the match was French forward Jean Barthe's tackle on Jan Prinsloo near the French try-line prevented a certain try. The momentum then swung to France who scored drop-goals—one each to Pierre Lacaze and Roger Martine—to secure the historic victory.

== 1960s ==
Even before the apartheid laws were passed after 1948, sporting teams going to South Africa had felt it necessary to exclude non-white players. New Zealand rugby teams in particular had done this, and the exclusion of George Nēpia and Jimmy Mill from the 1928 All Blacks tour, and the dropping of Ranji Wilson from the New Zealand Army team nine years before that, had attracted little comment at the time. However, in 1960 international criticism of apartheid grew in the wake of The Wind of Change speech and the Sharpeville massacre.

From this point onward, the Springboks were increasingly the target of international controversy and protest. The All Blacks toured in 1960 without their Maori players, who were excluded at the insistence of South Africa. This was controversial in New Zealand, with a "No Maoris, No Tour" campaign and a 150,000 signature petition opposing it. The Springboks avenged their 1956 series defeat by winning the Test series 2–1 with a Test drawn. The first match was won 13–0 by the Springboks with two tries to Hennie van Zyl. New Zealand journalist Noel Holmes said after the match "I hang my head in shame for having suggested that your forwards might be slow, even unfit." The All Blacks won the second Test 11–3 which they did so with a dominant forward pack and the tactical kicking of Don Clarke. The players selected for the third and fourth Tests formed the core of Springboks side for the next three seasons. The third Test was drawn 11–11 after a last minute sideline conversion from All Black Don Clarke. The deciding Test was won 8–3 by the Springboks with the decisive try scored by Martin Pelser.

Later that same year the Springboks themselves toured, and led by Avril Malan they defeated all four Home unions for their fourth Grand Slam. On a four-month, 34-game sweep through Europe they played a ruthless, forward-oriented game in which intimidation was a key part, and opposition players suffered a string of controversial injuries. However, they lost their final game 6–0 against the Barbarians in Cardiff, beaten when perhaps the Barbarians' pack played an uncharacteristically pragmatic game.

In 1962 the British Isles, won 16 of their 25 games on their tour to South Africa, but did not do so well in the Tests—losing three of the tests and drawing the other. In 1963 the touring Wallabies beat the Springboks in consecutive Tests, the first team to do so since the 1896 British team.

Wales toured South Africa and played several games and one Test in 1964—their first overseas tour. They lost the Test against South Africa in Durban 24–3, their biggest defeat in 40 years. At the Welsh Rugby Union (WRU) annual general meeting that year, the outgoing WRU President D. Ewart Davies declared that "it was evident from the experience of the South African Tour that a much more positive attitude to the game was required in Wales... Players must be prepared to learn, and indeed re-learn, to the absolute point of mastery, the basic principles of Rugby Union football."

South Africa had a disastrous year in 1965, when lost in a short tour losing to Ireland, Scotland, and in a second and long tour to Australia (twice) and New Zealand (three times) while winning just once against New Zealand.

The planned 1967' tour by the All Blacks was cancelled by the New Zealand Rugby Football Union after the South African government refused to allow Maori players.

In 1968 the Lions toured and won 15 of their 16 provincial matches, but lost three Tests and drew one.

Next year the 1969–70, Springbok tour to Britain and Ireland found a new spirit and confidence had developed in Home nations rugby, and the tourists lost two of their seven games in Wales—against Newport and a composite side from Monmouthshire. Wales nearly claimed their first win against the Springboks as the game ended 6–6. The Springboks lost the Test matches against England and Scotland, drawing the one against Ireland. Throughout the tour however, large anti-apartheid demonstrations were a feature, and many matches had to be played behind barbed wire fences.

== 1970s ==
In 1970 the All Blacks toured South Africa once again—after the 1967 stand-off, the South African government now agreed to treat Maoris in the team, and Maori spectators, as 'honorary whites'. The Springboks won the test series 3–1.

The Springbok tour of Australia in 1971 began with matches in Perth, then Adelaide and Melbourne. The Springboks won all three Tests, scoring 18–6, 14–6, and 19–11. As in Britain three years before however, massive anti-apartheid demonstrations greeted the team, and they had to be transported by the Royal Australian Air Force after the trade unions refused to service planes or trains transporting them. Although a tour of New Zealand had been planned for 1973, it was blocked by New Zealand Prime Minister Norman Kirk on the grounds of public safety.

The Lions team that toured South Africa in 1974 led by Willie John McBride was unbeaten over 22 games, and triumphed 3–0 (with one drawn) in the Test series. A key feature was the Lions' infamous '99 call'. Lions management had decided that the Springboks dominated their opponents with physical aggression, so decided "to get their retaliation in first". At the call of '99' each Lions player would attack their nearest rival player. The idea was that a South African referee would be unlikely to send off all of the Lions. At the "battle of Boet Erasmus Stadium"—one of the most violent matches in rugby history—J. P. R. Williams famously ran over half of the pitch and launched himself at 'Moaner' van Heerden after such a call.

The 1976 All Blacks tour of South Africa went ahead, and the Springboks won by three Tests to one, but coming shortly after the Soweto riots the tour attracted international condemnation and 28 countries boycotted the 1976 Summer Olympics in protest, and the next year, in 1977, the Commonwealth signed the Gleneagles Agreement, which discouraged any sporting contact with South Africa. In response to the growing pressure the segregated South African rugby unions merged in 1977. Four years later Errol Tobias would become the first non-white South African to represent his country when he took the field against Ireland. A planned 1979 Springbok tour of France was stopped by the French government, who announced that it was inappropriate for South African teams to tour France.

== 1980s ==
The Lions toured South Africa in 1980. The team completed a flawless non-Test record, winning 14 out of 14 non-Test matches on the tour. But they lost the first three Tests before winning the last one.

The 1981 tour of New Zealand went ahead in defiance of the Gleneagles Agreement. South Africa lost the series 2–1, but the tour and the massive civil disruption in New Zealand had ramifications far beyond rugby.

South Africa sought to counteract its sporting isolation by inviting the South American Jaguars to tour. The team contained mainly Argentinian players, whose national team had struggled to attract strong international opposition. Eight matches were played between the two teams in the early 1980s—all awarded Test status.

In 1984 England toured losing both test matches on tour. Of the players selected, only Ralph Knibbs of Bristol refused to tour for political reasons.

In 1985, a planned All Black tour of South Africa was stopped by the New Zealand High Court. A rebel tour took place the next year by a team known as the Cavaliers. The team was not sanctioned by the New Zealand Rugby Football Union, yet consisted of all but two of the original squad that had been selected. For some of the tests, the team was advertised, inside South Africa as the All Blacks whilst at the others they were advertised as the New Zealand Cavaliers. The Springboks won the series 3–1.

In 1989, a World XV sanctioned by the International Rugby Board went on a mini-tour of South Africa. All traditional rugby nations bar New Zealand supplied players to the team with ten Welshmen, eight Frenchmen, six Australians, four Englishmen, one Scot and one Irishman.

== 1990s ==
From 1990 to 1991 the legal apparatus of apartheid was abolished, and the Springboks were readmitted to international rugby in 1992. They struggled to return to their pre-isolation standards in their first games after readmission. During the 1992 All Blacks tour, the first to South Africa since 1976, the Springboks were defeated 27–24 by New Zealand on 15 August 1992 and also suffered a 26–3 loss to Australia the following month. Ian McIntosh was sacked as national coach following a series defeat by the All Blacks in New Zealand in mid-1994. In October of that year, Kitch Christie accepted an offer to take over from McIntosh.

South Africa was selected to host the 1995 Rugby World Cup, and there was a remarkable surge of support for the Springboks among the white and black communities in the lead-up to the tournament. This was the first major event to be held in what Archbishop Desmond Tutu had dubbed "the Rainbow Nation." South Africans of all colours got behind the slogan coined by Edward Griffiths, then CEO of the rugby federation: "one team, one country".

By the time they hosted the 1995 World Cup, the Springboks were seeded ninth. They defeated Australia, Romania, Canada, Western Samoa and France to play in the final.

South Africa narrowly won the epic 1995 Rugby World Cup final 15–12 against traditional rivals the All Blacks. A drop goal by Joel Stransky secured victory in extra-time.

Wearing a Springbok shirt, Nelson Mandela presented the trophy to captain Francois Pienaar, a white Afrikaner. The gesture was widely seen as a major step towards the reconciliation of white and black South Africans. Mandela's enthusiasm and support for the Springboks is portrayed in the 2009 film Invictus. SARFU President Louis Luyt caused controversy at the post-match dinner by declaring that the Springboks would have won the previous two World Cups if they had been allowed to compete. The day after the World Cup victory, the Xhosa word for Springbok, Amabokoboko! appeared as the headline of The Sowetan's sports page.

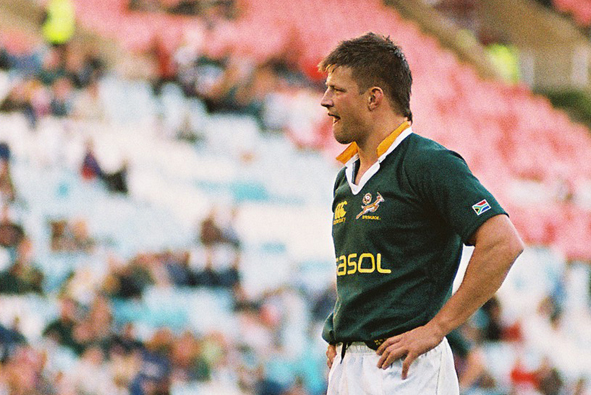
Bobby Skinstad in June 2007

A series of crises followed in 1995 through 1997 as it became clear that South African rugby was an unreformed element of the new Rainbow Nation. The team was also struck by tragedy, as Christie, who had led them to victory in all 14 Tests he coached, was forced to resign in 1996 after battling leukaemia for more than a decade. An on-field slump saw South African sides struggle in the new Super 12 and Tri-Nations competitions. Under new coach John Hart and the captaincy of Sean Fitzpatrick, the All Blacks won a Test series in South Africa for the first time in 1996. Fitzpatrick even rated the series win higher than the 1987 World Cup victory in which he had participated. The 1997 Lions completed their South African tour with only two losses in total, winning the Test series two games to one.

Coach Andre Markgraaff was fired in 1997 over a racial comment he made. Despite a successful career as a player, Markgraaff's replacement Carel du Plessis led the team to successive defeats in the British and Irish Lions 1997 tour and the 1997 Tri Nations Series. He was replaced later in 1997 by Nick Mallett, who went on to coach the unbeaten 1997 South Africa rugby union tour of Europe in late 1997. In 1998 Mallett and new captain Gary Teichmann tied the then-existing record of the 1965–69 All Blacks for longest Test winning streak, winning 17 consecutive Tests, including the 1998 Tri-Nations. (Note: This record was surpassed by Lithuania in 2010, but remains a record for "Tier 1" rugby nations.) In the same year, South Africa mourned as Christie's illness claimed his life.

Despite indications that the Springboks were a team on the decline prior to the 1999 Rugby World Cup, they reached the semi-finals of the competition, where they lost to eventual champions Australia at Twickenham.

== 2000–2009 ==
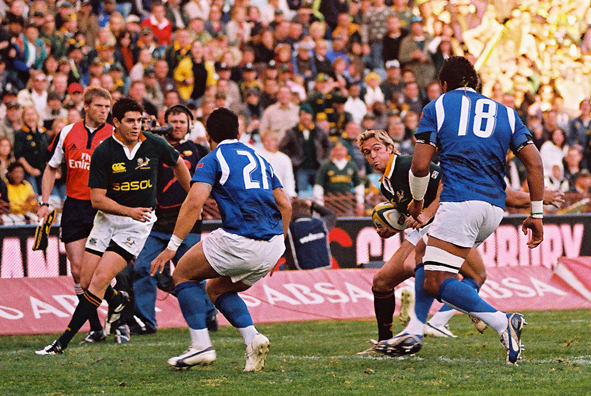
Percy Montgomery running the ball for the Springboks against Samoa in 2007, with Jaque Fourie supporting on the outside.

During the 2002 tour, at Twickenham in November 2002 England defeated South Africa 53–3, which was their worst ever loss, after Springbok Jannes Labuschagne was red-carded after 23 minutes and the Boks played three-quarters of the match one man short. An increasingly frustrated South African side began physically targeting England players during the match, with footage showing captain Corné Krige as a leader. In the 2002 and 2003 seasons, the Springboks also lost by record margins to France, Scotland and New Zealand. They defeated Argentina by only one point, and were eliminated from the 2003 World Cup in the quarter-final round – their worst ever showing in a World Cup record of two gold and one bronze from five appearances.

During a pre-World Cup training camp, there was a highly publicised dispute between Geo Cronjé (an Afrikaner) and Quinton Davids (a coloured). Both were dropped from the team, and Cronjé was called before a tribunal to answer charges that his actions in the dispute were racially motivated. Cronjé was eventually cleared. Later, the Boks were sent to a military-style boot camp in the South African bush called Kamp Staaldraad (literal English translation "Camp Steel-wire", idiomatically "Camp Barbed Wire"). After the World Cup, then-coach Rudolf Straeuli was under fire, not only because of the team's poor results, but because of his role in organising Kamp Staaldraad. He eventually resigned, and in February 2004 Jake White was named as new national coach.

The Springboks then swept Ireland in a two-Test series and defeated Wales during their opponents' June 2004 tours of the Southern Hemisphere. Next came a win in the most closely contested Tri Nations in history—their only Tri Nations trophy since 1998. In November 2004, the Springboks went on a Grand Slam tour of the Home Nations. They were decisively defeated by England, and lost controversially to Ireland. They then won a hard-fought match against Wales, and prevailed comfortably against Scotland. The Springbok resurgence was honoured with a sweep of the major International Rugby Board awards. The Boks were named Team of the Year, White Coach of the Year, and flanker Schalk Burger Player of the Year.

In 2005 the Springboks defeated an embarrassed Uruguay by a world record margin. Zimbabwean-born new cap, Tonderai Chavanga, scored a record six tries in the match, surpassing Stefan Terblanche's previous record of five. The side finished second in the Tri-Nations that year, losing their final match to New Zealand. The springboks thought they had the match before Keven Mealamu scored the match winning try for the All Blacks in the 27–31 loss. The year ended positively with close victories away from home against Argentina, among others.

With several new players aboard, the 2006 Springboks defeated Scotland twice in South Africa, before a loss to France ended their long undefeated home record. A bad start to the 2006 Tri Nations Series saw them lose 49–0 to the Wallabies. The Springboks put together better games in the following two matches, losing in the final minutes in the second test against Australia. Answering the call from many South African supporters to play a more expansive style of rugby, coach Jake White fielded a more adventurous team. They broke South Africa's five-game losing streak by beating the All Blacks 21–20 at Royal Bafokeng Stadium. The All Blacks' defeat by the South Africans was their only loss of the year. The highlight of South Africa's tour to Europe was the 24–15 win over England at Twickenham, after a loss to Ireland and one to England the previous week. In July 2006, Springbok coach Jake White told the press he had been unable to pick some white players for his squad "because of transformation"—a reference to the ANC government's policies attempting to redress the racial imbalances in national sport.

=== Rugby World Cup 2007 ===
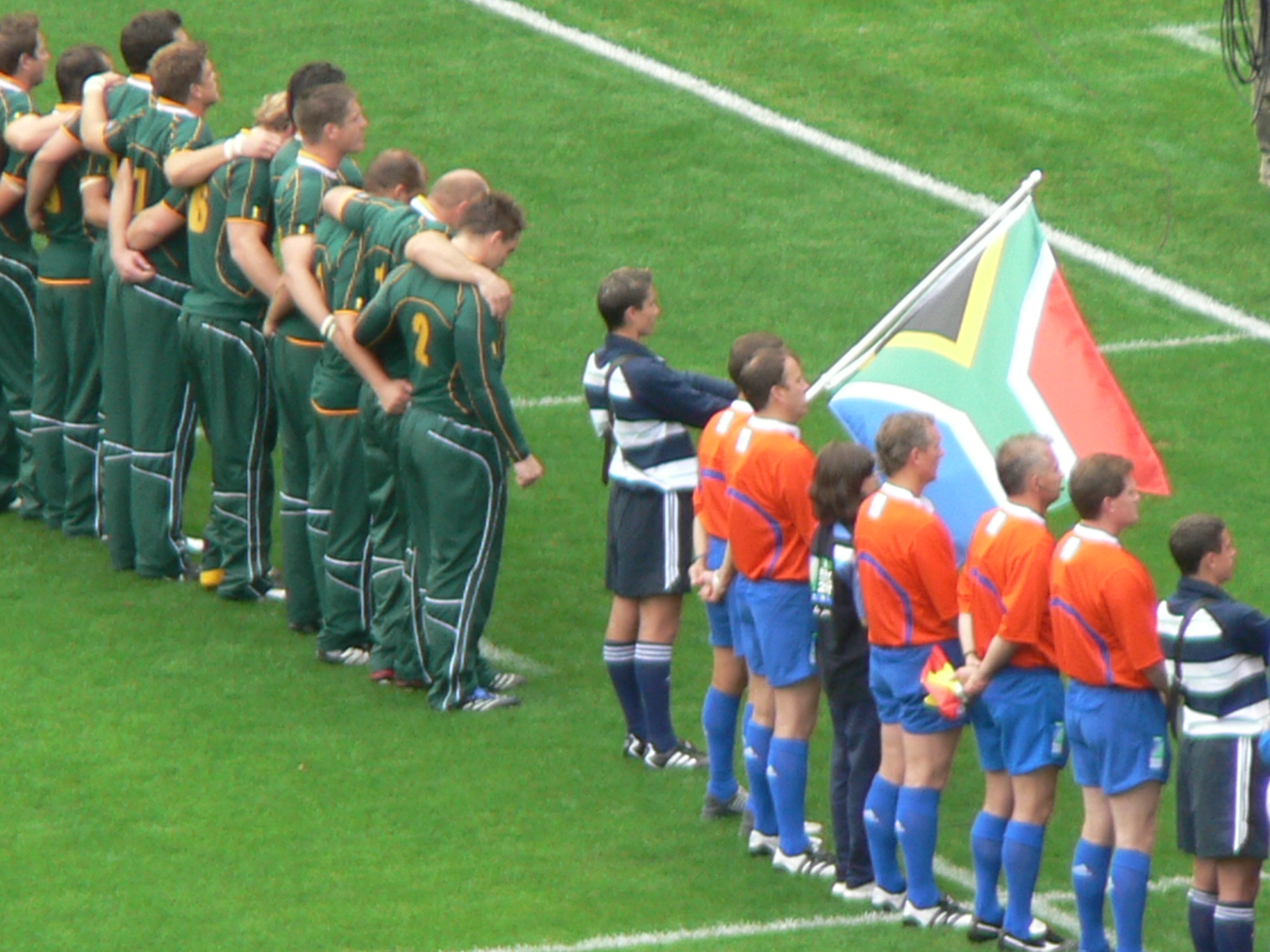
The Springboks

Grouped in Pool A at the 2007 Rugby World Cup in France, they opened their campaign in Paris with a 59–7 victory over Samoa. Next up was England at the Stade de France, where the Springboks triumphed 36–-0. The third pool game against Tonga in Lens was more competitive and they narrowly won 30–25. The final pool game against the US in Montpellier produced a 64–15 win.

Having won all their pool games, they advanced to the quarter-finals to defeat Fiji 37–20 before accounting for Argentina 37–13 in the semi-finals. They prevailed 15–6 over England to lift the Webb Ellis Cup for a second time on 20 October 2007. The Springboks won the match joining Australia as the only other national team, at the time, to have won the trophy twice (New Zealand also won it for a second time in 2011).

=== After the World Cup ===
2008 was a mixed year for the Springboks. Going into the year as world champions, they were under pressure to perform. In January 2008, Peter de Villiers was appointed as the first non-white coach of the Springboks. De Villiers's first squad included ten of colour and managed two victories against Wales (43–17 and 37–21) and one against Italy (26–0) in Incoming Tours. They had an ultimately disappointing Tri Nations ending up last with only two wins. They did manage a historic triumph in Dunedin, a city in which they had never tasted victory in over 100 years. The Springboks beat Wales and Scotland before thrashing England on the end of year tour.

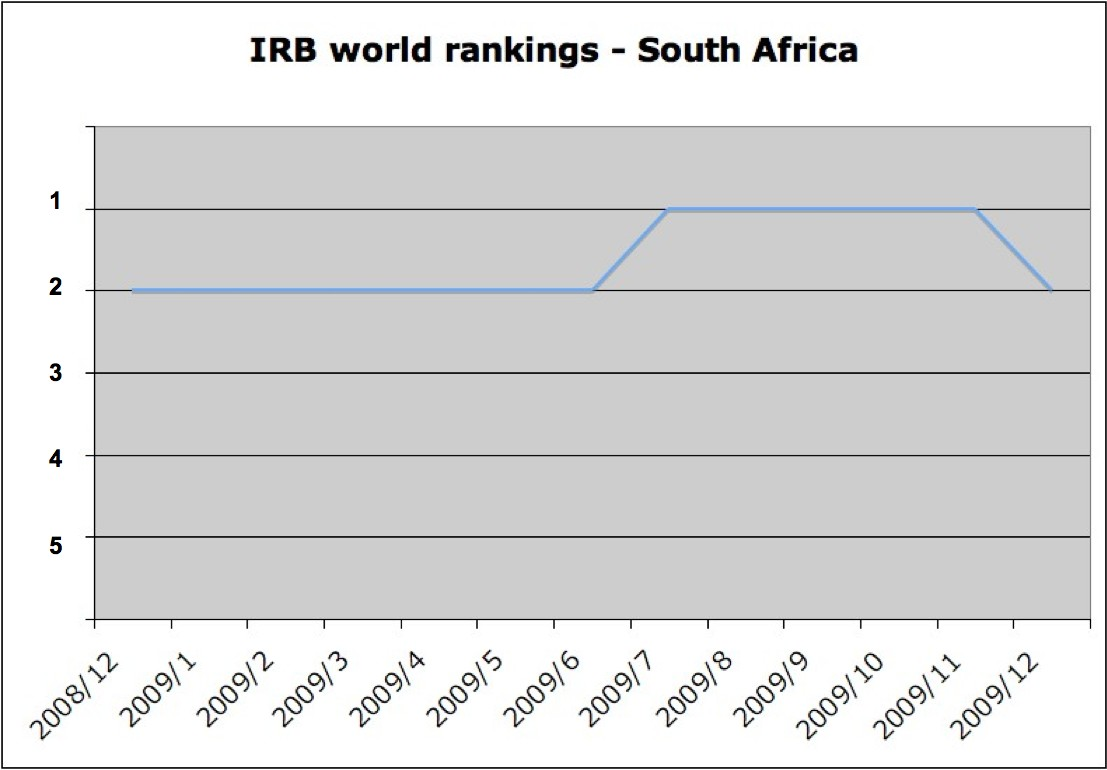
Springbok rankings during 2009

The 2009 season began as one of the more successful. The Boks' 2009 international campaign began with a closely fought 2–1 series win over the Lions. They followed it up with a win in the Tri Nations, sweeping the All Blacks and losing only to the Wallabies in Brisbane, adding the Freedom Cup (against New Zealand) and the Mandela Challenge Plate (against Australia) to their trophy cabinet. However, the Boks' busy year took its toll when they toured Europe in the November Test window. They lost their top spot in the IRB rankings with a loss to France. The Boks then defeated Italy, but were beaten by Ireland to close out the year. Nonetheless, the Boks were named IRB International Team of the Year, beating out Six Nations Grand Slam winners Ireland.

== 2010–present ==
The Boks began their 2010 Test campaign on 5 June, defeating Wales 34–31 in Cardiff. After defeating Wales, the Springboks headed back to Cape Town to play against France, which they won 42–17. The Springbok victory over the French was their first since 2005. Their final preparations for the 2010 Tri-Nations tournament includes two internationals against Italy. In the first test the Springbok team beat Italy by 29–13, and in the second test beat the Azzuri 55–11.

The Boks were widely fancied to beat the All Blacks at Eden Park in Auckland in the first Tri-Nations test of 2010. The Boks had only previously won twice at Eden park, the last time being in 1937. However, the first test of the 2010 Tri Nations campaign turned out to be a nightmare for the Boks. They went down 32–12. Since then, the Boks lost consecutive tests to again succeed both the Tri-Nations trophy and Freedom Cup to the world number one ranked All Blacks, as well as lose the Mandela Plate and second place IRB World Ranking to Australia.

On 6 November 2010, the Springboks had the honour of being the first Test team to play Ireland at their new home of Aviva Stadium. Because of the historic significance of this match, the Boks had agreed to wear their change strip to allow Ireland to wear their regular green. (Normally, the home team changes in case of a colour clash.) The match was the opener of their first attempted Grand Slam tour since 2004, with the Ireland match followed by encounters with Wales, Scotland and England. The Boks followed the tour up with a match against the Barbarians.

=== 2011 and the Rugby World Cup ===
The Springboks kicked off their 2011 test season with controversy, with 21 high-profile players omitted from the away leg of the 2011 Tri Nations, leaving only captain John Smit and Morné Steyn as regular members of the starting XV amongst a largely second-string side. Media sources claimed that the Boks players were simply being rested in preparation for the upcoming World Cup, thus creating outcry that the 2011 Tri Nations was being turned into a farce by the Springboks. The Boks subsequently lost both of their away games. The home leg saw the return of the first-choice players, and the Boks went on to lose to Australia, but win the following week 18–5 against New Zealand. The Springboks finished the 2011 Tri Nations with just the one win.

The South Africans entered the 2011 Rugby World Cup drawn in a pool against Wales, Samoa, Fiji and Namibia. Despite a close opening encounter against Wales, which was won 17–16, the Springboks went on to top their group, registering convincing wins against Fiji and Namibia, before winning another close match against Samoa 13–5. The Springboks then faced Australia in a highly controversial quarter-final match, ultimately losing 11–9 and falling out of the tournament. The South African fans and pundits went on to criticise New Zealand referee Bryce Lawrence for "one-sided" refereeing, claiming that Australian openside David Pocock was allowed to "reduce the breakdown to a farce". Lawrence was dropped from the nine-man elite panel in 2012.

Following the World Cup exit, several stalwarts of the 2007 World Cup-winning side and the 2011 squad went on to announce retirements or moves abroad. This included captain John Smit, influential lock pairing Victor Matfield and Bakkies Botha, and scrum-half Fourie du Preez.

== See also ==
- Rugby union in South Africa
