= Supabets =

South African sports betting company

Supabets Gaming Group
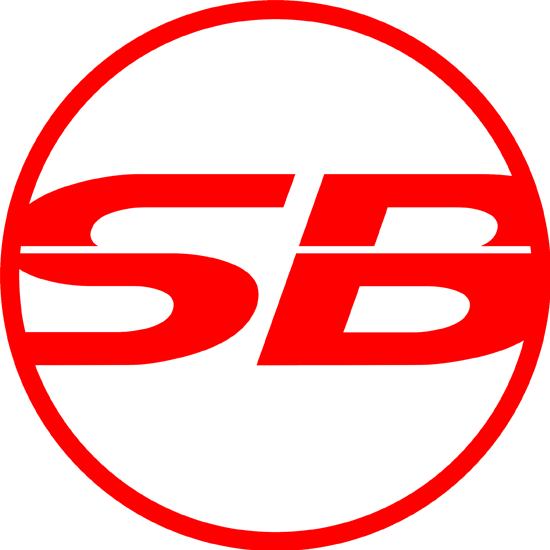

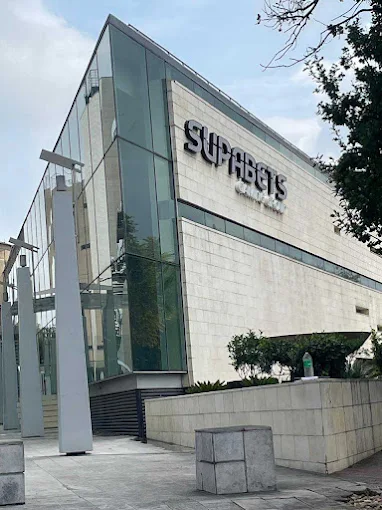
- Headquarters in Illovo, Sandton
- Company type: Privately held company
- Industry: Online Gambling
- Headquarters: 37 Fricker Road, Illovo, Johannesburg, Gauteng
- Area served: South Africa
- Services: Online and mobile betting
- Number of employees: 3,665+
- Website: Official website

Supabets is a South African sports betting and online gaming company that operates retail betting outlets and online platforms. It offers sports wagering, online casino games, and virtual gaming products.

== History ==
Supabets became established as a licensed betting operator in South Africa following the formalisation of gambling regulations under the National Gambling Act, with its licences published in the Government Gazette.

In 2017, Phumelela Gaming and Leisure Limited launched a R284 million rights offer.

By 2021, Supabets was part of initiatives to enhance local retail betting outlets, contributing to upgrades aimed at boosting community engagement in regulated gambling areas.

Supabets is regularly listed among the top sports betting and slots platforms in South Africa by local media, including News24 and The Citizen, which cite its product range and user accessibility.

== Partnerships ==
In 2023, Supabets partnered with WA.Technology to expand its technology infrastructure and scale operations across South Africa.

The company has also entered into content distribution agreements with global studios such as Habanero and SmartSoft Gaming.

== Controversies ==
Supabets was among the companies that withdrew sponsorship from South African podcaster MacG in February 2021, after homophobic remarks led to backlash and corporate distancing by several brands.

The South African betting sector, including operators like Supabets, has also faced scrutiny amid disputes between casinos and bookmakers over the legality and regulation of roulette betting in Gauteng, where Supabets and similar operators were active stakeholders.
