= History of rugby union matches between Scotland and South Africa =

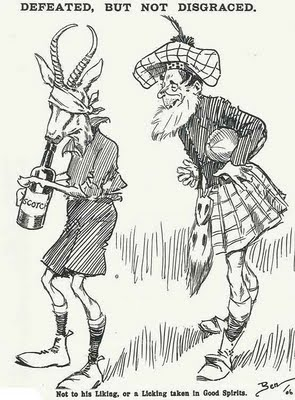
Cartoon after the SA-Scotland match in 1906

The national rugby union teams of Scotland and South Africa (the Springboks) have been playing each other in Test rugby since 1906, and as of November 2025, they have met in 30 Test matches. Their first meeting was on 17 November 1906, and was won 6–0 by Scotland and their most recent match was on 10 November 2024 and was won 32–15 by South Africa.

South Africa have won the majority of games played between the two sides, with 25 victories in the 30 matches. They are also the only team to win an away match between the sides, having won 15 times in Scotland. South Africa have won all seven of their home games. Since South Africa's rugby re-admission in 1992, South Africa has dominated once again, winning 20 of the 22 encounters between the two.

The 1906 match between Scotland and South Africa was the first test match on South Africa's first official international rugby tour. It was also the tour in which the Springbok nickname was coined. South Africa lost to Scotland, defeated Ireland and Wales and drew with England. They also played a game against a representative French side drawn from two Parisian clubs and won.

== Rugby World Cup ==
The teams have met three times in the Rugby World Cup, all in the group stages, with South Africa winning each time, in 1999, 2015 and 2023.

== Summary ==
=== Overall ===
Details	Played	Won by Scotland	Won by South Africa	Drawn	Scotland points	South Africa points
In Scotland	21	5	16	0	212	515
In South Africa	8	0	8	0	136	267
Neutral venue	2	0	2	0	19	52
Overall	31	5	26	0	367	834

=== Records ===
Note: Date shown in brackets indicates when the record was or last set.

Record	Scotland	South Africa
Longest winning streak	2 (17 Apr 1965 – 19 Nov 1994)	10 (17 Nov 2012–present)
Largest points for
Home	29 (3 October 1999)	55 (28 June 2014)
Away	28 (11 July 2026)	68 (6 December 1997)
Largest winning margin
Home	15 (16 November 2002)	49 (28 June 2014)
Away	NA	58 (6 December 1997)
Largest aggregate score
78 (Scotland 10 - 68 South Africa) (6 December 1997)

== Results ==
No.	Date	Venue	Score	Winner	Competition
1	17 November 1906	Hampden Park, Glasgow	6–0	Scotland	1906–07 South Africa rugby union tour of Europe
2	23 November 1912	Inverleith, Edinburgh	0–16	South Africa	1912-13 South Africa rugby union tour of Europe
3	16 January 1932	Murrayfield, Edinburgh	3–6	South Africa	1931–32 South Africa rugby union tour of Britain and Ireland
4	24 November 1951	Murrayfield, Edinburgh	0–44	South Africa	1951–52 South Africa rugby union tour of Europe
5	30 April 1960	EPRU Stadium, Port Elizabeth	18–10	South Africa	
6	21 January 1961	Murrayfield, Edinburgh	5–12	South Africa	1960–61 South Africa rugby union tour of Europe
7	17 April 1965	Murrayfield, Edinburgh	8–5	Scotland	1965 South Africa rugby union tour of Scotland and Ireland
8	6 December 1969	Murrayfield, Edinburgh	6–3	Scotland	1969–70 South Africa rugby union tour of Britain and Ireland
9	19 November 1994	Murrayfield, Edinburgh	10–34	South Africa	1994 South Africa rugby union tour of Britain and Ireland
10	6 December 1997	Murrayfield, Edinburgh	10–68	South Africa	1997 South Africa rugby union tour of Europe
11	21 November 1998	Murrayfield, Edinburgh	10–35	South Africa	1998 South Africa rugby union tour of Britain and Ireland
12	3 October 1999	Murrayfield, Edinburgh	29–46	South Africa	1999 Rugby World Cup
13	16 November 2002	Murrayfield, Edinburgh	21–6	Scotland	2002 South Africa rugby union tour of Europe
14	7 June 2003	Kings Park Stadium, Durban	29–25	South Africa	2003 Scotland rugby union tour of South Africa
15	14 June 2003	Ellis Park, Johannesburg	28–19	South Africa	2003 Scotland rugby union tour of South Africa
16	27 November 2004	Murrayfield, Edinburgh	10–45	South Africa	2004 Autumn Internationals
17	10 June 2006	Kings Park Stadium, Durban	36–16	South Africa	2006 mid-year rugby test series
18	17 June 2006	EPRU Stadium, Port Elizabeth	29–15	South Africa	2006 mid-year rugby test series
19	25 August 2007	Murrayfield, Edinburgh	3–27	South Africa	2007 Rugby World Cup warm-up test
20	15 November 2008	Murrayfield, Edinburgh	10–14	South Africa	2008 Autumn International
21	20 November 2010	Murrayfield, Edinburgh	21–17	Scotland	2010 Autumn International
22	17 November 2012	Murrayfield, Edinburgh	10–21	South Africa	2012 Autumn International
23	15 June 2013	Mbombela Stadium, Nelspruit	30–17	South Africa	South African Quadrangular tournament
24	17 November 2013	Murrayfield, Edinburgh	0–28	South Africa	2013 Autumn International
25	28 June 2014	Nelson Mandela Bay Stadium, Port Elizabeth	55–6	South Africa	2014 Mid-year Test
26	3 October 2015	St James' Park, Newcastle, England	34–16	South Africa	2015 Rugby World Cup
27	17 November 2018	Murrayfield, Edinburgh	20–26	South Africa	2018 Autumn International
28	13 November 2021	Murrayfield, Edinburgh	15–30	South Africa	2021 Autumn International
29	10 September 2023	Stade Vélodrome, Marseille	18–3	South Africa	2023 Rugby World Cup
30	10 November 2024	Murrayfield, Edinburgh	15–32	South Africa	2024 Autumn International
31	11 July 2026	Loftus Versfeld, Pretoria	42–28	South Africa	2026 Nations Championship

== List of series ==
Played	Won by Scotland	Won by South Africa	Drawn
2	0	2	0

Year	Scotland	South Africa	Series winner
(South Africa) 2003	0	2	South Africa
(South Africa) 2006	0	2	South Africa
