= Kitch Christie =

South African rugby union coach (1940–1998)

George Moir Christie
- Born: 31 January 1940; Johannesburg, Union of South Africa
- Died: 22 April 1998 (aged 58); Pretoria, South Africa
- Education: Leith Academy; London Institute of Electronics
- Occupation: Rugby Union Coach

George Moir Christie, better known as Kitch Christie OIS (31 January 1940 – 22 April 1998), was a South African rugby union coach best known for coaching the country's national team, the Springboks, to victory at the 1995 Rugby World Cup. He remained unbeaten during his tenure as Springbok rugby coach between 1994 and 1996, including leading the team to a then record 14 consecutive victories. In 2011, he was inducted posthumously into the IRB Hall of Fame, later subsumed into the World Rugby Hall of Fame.

== Early life ==
Born in Johannesburg to a Scottish father and English mother, he was educated at Leith Academy in Edinburgh and the London Institute of Electronics. He picked up his lifelong nickname of "Kitch" from his fellow pupils, who named him after Don Kitchenbrand, a South African footballer with Rangers in the 1950s.

== Early career ==
Christie returned to South Africa after his education, and joined the Pretoria Harlequins club as a flanker. While his playing career was uneventful, during his time with the Harlequins that Christie began developing his coaching skills. It was the start of an enduring association with Quins—broken only by a spell as coach of the Glenwood Old Boys in Durban—during which he coached them to a number of trophies as well as serving as a Northern Transvaal selector.

In 1980, Christie spent the South African winter (Northern Hemisphere summer) in the United States, coaching the Chicago Lions club. Although he spent less than three months in Chicago, he made an impact on the club, leading them to the Midwest regional crown.

In 1992, having been denied the opportunity to coach at Northern Transvaal, Christie accepted an offer from Louis Luyt, then the president of the Transvaal union, to take the reins there. Luyt went on to play an important role in Christie's later career.

At Transvaal Christie established himself as one of the finest coaches in South African rugby, leading the team to one of their most successful periods. Transvaal won back to back Currie Cup titles in 1993 and 1994, their first wins in the competition since 1972, as well as winning the inaugural Super 10 title in 1993. In 1993, the team won all four of the competitions they entered (Currie Cup, Super 10, Lion Cup, M-NET Night Series). The team, with Francois Pienaar as captain, later formed the nucleus of the Christie's Springbok team that won the 1995 Rugby World Cup, providing 13 members to the squad.

== The Springboks ==
In 1994, Luyt was appointed president of the South African Rugby Football Union. The Springboks' coaching position became vacant in mid-1994, after Ian McIntosh was sacked following a series defeat to the All Blacks in New Zealand. Luyt was convinced that Christie was the man to take over following his success at Transvaal, and in October 1994, Christie accepted the offer to take over from McIntosh.

Christie took over at a pivotal time, with the run-up to the 1995 Rugby World Cup, hosted by South Africa, and the first major competition for the Springboks after their return from international exile with the end of apartheid. Christie had just nine months to transform the team into World Cup contenders.

He began his international coaching career with back-to-back victories at home against Argentina in October 1994, followed by a successful tour to Europe in November 1994, when the team beat Scotland and Wales.

After a comfortable victory in a World Cup warm-up game against Samoa in April 1995, the World Cup campaign got off to a flying start, with the team defeating defending champions and pre-tournament favourites Australia in the opening match at Newlands in Cape Town. Victory in this game seemed crucial, with Christie referring to it as allowing the team to take the "high road in the competition, avoiding teams such as England and New Zealand until the final.

They went on to win their remaining pool matches, but not without a brutal game against Canada in the final pool match. They then defeated Manu Samoa in the quarterfinals, and eked out a dramatic semifinal win over France. South Africa's reward for defeating France was a final against New Zealand, and their sensational wing Jonah Lomu, who had set the tournament alight with his tries, including four in their semi-final against England.

The team's defence stood up to the challenge, keeping Lomu off the scoreboard (in fact, he never scored a try against South Africa in his career). The match ended in a 9–9 draw after 80 minutes, sending the teams to extra time, after which South Africa won 15–12. The victory on home soil in 1995 touched people far beyond rugby's normal constituency, and will be best remembered for Nelson Mandela, wearing the captain's number 6 shirt, embracing the captain Francois Pienaar after South Africa's victory, a scene recreated in the movie Invictus.

Christie's final game in charge of the Springboks was a victory over England at Twickenham on a short tour in November 1995. By this time, his health had deteriorated due to leukemia, which he had been battling since 1979. Francois Pienaar, in his autobiography, recalled how Christie joined the team huddle and stood between Pienaar and James Dalton. "The usual end to such a Springboks huddle is for the players to squeeze each other and shout 'Bokke'," said Pienaar. "James and I squeezed the coach and discovered later we'd fractured two of his ribs. He never said a word."

In March 1996, Christie stepped down from the Springboks due to ill health and was replaced by Andre Markgraaf.

Christie coached South Africa in 14 tests between October 1994 and March 1996, winning all 14. At the time, this tied 1960s All Blacks coach Fred Allen's record for the longest Test match winning streak for a coach. This record was later broken by South Africa coach Nick Mallett.

== Final years ==
After resigning as Springbok coach in March 1996, Christie's treatment went well enough that he was finally able to fulfill a longtime dream of coaching Northern Transvaal, accepting the head coaching job for the 1997 Super 12 season. However, due to ill-health, he was unable to travel with the team to Australasia early in the season, and he was hospitalised a few weeks later after his condition took a turn for the worse. It was there that Christie experienced one of the lowest moments in his career when he was fired as coach by Northerns' president Hentie Serfontein while he lay in his hospital bed. Christie described this as being fired "like a dog".

By the end of 1997, his condition worsened to the point that he sought specialist treatment in the U.S. He was able to return to rugby as a technical adviser to the Falcons in early 1998, but his condition worsened once more, entering hospital for the final time on Easter Sunday of 1998. Christie died on 22 April 1998 in Pretoria, leaving his wife Judy of 19 years, their son Clayton, and his two daughters, Catherine and Caroline, from a previous marriage.

Sporting positions
Preceded by (South Africa) Ian McIntosh	South Africa National Rugby Union Coach; 1994–1996	Succeeded by (South Africa) Andre Markgraaff
