= Gambling in South Africa =

Gambling in South Africa has been heavily restricted since 1673, with South Africa's Gambling Act of 1965 officially banning all forms of gambling except betting on horse racing which existed as a sporting activity.

In the late 1970s casinos started operating in the bantustans (the nominally independent areas called homelands) of Bophuthatswana, Ciskei, Transkei and Venda. Only native South Africans lived there and most citizens couldn't access those gaming establishments. By 1995 an estimated 2000 illegal casinos were believed to be operating within the country. In 1994, when the new democratic government came to power, all forms of gambling were legalised. In 1996 the National Gambling Act instituted a system of licensed casinos and a single national lottery. Horse racing was also proclaimed gambling activity.

The National Gambling Act of 1996 made provisions for the regulation of gambling activities and promotion of uniform norms and standards in relation to gambling throughout the country. It gave definitions to different gambling notions, described how the 40 gambling licenses should be distributed among the provinces and provided information on liability. It also established the National Gambling Board, an organisation responsible for the supervision and regulation of the gambling industry. This change in legislation saw the establishment of legal casinos, a national lottery and other forms of gaming.

In 2004, another National Gambling Act repealed the Act of 1996. And in 2008 The National Gambling Amendment Act was introduced.

== Prevalence and value ==
According to the 2006 study the most popular forms of gambling in South Africa were the National Lottery (96.9% participation), slot machines (27.7% participation), scratchcards (22.7% participation), charity jackpot competitions (11.6% participation) and horse racing betting (11.5% participation). 8.3% of respondents said they have never gambled and a further 5.5% characterised themselves as occasional game players with no regular forms of gambling.

In the 2006/2007 financial year licensed gross gambling revenue as monitored by the National Gambling Board totalled R13.52 billion, from R11.4 billion the previous year. 86.2 percent of that revenue was derived in casinos. In the same period the Board reported a total of 455 raids on and closures of presumed illegal gambling operations.

South Africa's gambling revenues are projected to rise to R30 billion in 2019, according to a new report. The South African gambling industry – including casinos, sports betting, the National Lottery, limited payout machines and bingo – achieved gross gambling revenue of R26.3bn in 2016.

== Types of gambling ==
=== South African National Lottery ===
The South African National Lottery was established in 2000 and has been in continuous operation since, apart from a suspension between April 2007 and October 2007. In its last year of operation transaction values totalled R3.972 billion, with an average of five million transactions per week, making it the most popular form of gambling in South Africa. South Africa is known as one of the largest countries to participate in the UK49's lottery draw operated by Ladbrokes Coral.

Gambling revenue from the National Lottery is projected to increase to R2.33 billion in 2019.

=== Casinos ===
Casinos operate in all metropolitan areas in South Africa. With the largest being the Rio Casino Resort, which is also the largest casino in Africa and the fifth-largest casino in the world. Tsogo Sun Montecasino, also located in Johannesburg, is another of South Africa's largest casinos.

=== Horse racing ===
On-track betting on horse races was the only legal form of gambling in South African until 1996. Due to its complexity and the difficulty of attracting new players it did not effectively compete with the newly introduced National Lottery and casino games.

Betting on horse races is controlled by Saftote and operated by Gold Circle in KwaZulu-Natal and the Western Cape and by Phumelela in the remainder of the country.

== Online gambling ==
=== Licensed gambling sites ===
Each of South Africa's nine provinces has a gambling and racing board. To offer online betting bookies must be licensed by one of these boards. Currently the Western Cape Gambling and Racing Board (WCGRB) is largest provider of online bookmaker licenses. South Africa residents can use these online betting sites legally. For bets involving horse racing 6% is deducted from winning to cover VAT. As of May 2012, no additional tax is charged to recreational bettors, and recreational gambling winnings are not considered income for income tax purposes.

=== Online gaming laws ===
The National Gambling Act 2004 prohibited both offering interactive gambling services and engaging in interactive games (games on the Internet). This rule applies to all online operators, licensed in any jurisdiction. It's however important to note interactive gambling relates specifically to games such as casino, poker and bingo. Online sports betting, online horse race betting and the business of bookmaking is lawful in South Africa, provided that the person conducting such business holds the necessary provincial bookmaker's licence(s).

The National Gambling Amendment Act of 2008 which was published in July 2008 was meant to be an attempt to legalise interactive gambling in the country and make provisions for the regulation of this market. The Amendment Act was actively confronted by the interested parties (land-based gambling houses and anti-money laundering authorities). For this reason, the Act hasn't come into power yet.

On 20 August 2010 even online gambling offered through servers located outside the country was banned in South Africa. This was the result of the North Gauteng High Court judgement on the jurisdiction of online gambling transactions in the country. Consequently, both offering gambling services online and gambling online became illegal. The only exceptions are province licensed horse racing and online sports betting. Casino sites, individuals, internet service providers and banks that process payments for online gamblers are subject to a fine of R 10 million or 10 years of imprisonment, or both. Mass media channels that transmit or facilitate advertisement of online gambling services (TV and radio, newspapers and magazines, outdoor advertising agencies) are also to be held liable.

The South African Department of Trade and Industry also suggested to consider penny auctions a type of online gambling and illegalise them. The National Gambling Amendment Act of 2008 may come into force after an appeal to a high court ruling against "interactive gambling" is heard.

As of 2021 there were over 30 licensed online sports betting sites in South Africa, including local South African operators such as Bet.co.za and Supabets as well as international operators including Betway and Sportingbet. All online sports betting websites are licensed by their respective provinces and by the NGB.
