= Protekon =

State-owned enterprise SOE

- Company type: State-owned enterprise SOE
- Industry: Infrastructure management Engineering
- Headquarters: Johannesburg; Durban
- Products: Infrastructure management services for ports, railways, terminals and pipelines
- Revenue: ~
- Number of employees: ~
- Website: www.protekon.co.za

Protekon performs maintenance and development services for the ports, railways and terminals of South Africa's state-owned transportation giant Transnet. It is similar in function to the company Transnet Engineering, which performs maintenance and development for the rolling stock of Transnet's railways divisions.
