= Cape Unicorns Polocrosse Club =

South African Polocrosse club

== Location ==
The Cape Unicorns Polocrosse Club is based at the Paarl Diamant equestrian school, situated next to the R44 (Western Cape) on the Western side of Paarl Mountain, within the Western Cape province of South Africa.

== Affiliation ==
The club is affiliated to the Western Province Polocrosse Association, which is affiliated to the Polocrosse Association of South Africa (PASA). The club is currently the biggest within the Western Province Polocrosse Association.

== Achievements ==
=== 2008 ===
The Cape Unicorns A-Division team emerged as the winners of the 2008 South African Polocrosse Championships, where 39 teams from throughout South Africa competed at the Noodsberg Country Club in Kwazulu-Natal.

=== 2007 ===
Jan Albert Steenkamp represented the Cape Unicorns within the South African national team during the 2007 Polocrosse World Cup, held in Australia at Morgan Park in the city of Warwick, Queensland.
