= List of official names of South Africa =

11 official names of South Africa

There are eleven official names of South Africa, one in each of its official languages. The number is surpassed only by India. These languages include English, Afrikaans, the Nguni languages (Zulu, Xhosa, Ndebele, and Swazi), the Sotho-Tswana languages (Tswana, Sotho, and Pedi), Venda, and Tsonga.

There are smaller but still significant groups of speakers of Khoi-San languages, which are not official, but one of the eight unofficially recognised languages. There are even smaller groups of speakers of endangered languages, many of which are from the Khoi-San family, but receive no official status; however, some groups are attempting to promote their use and revival.

The official names are:

| Language | Long form | Short form |
|---|---|---|
| Afrikaans | Republiek van Suid-Afrika | Suid-Afrika |
| English | Republic of South Africa | South Africa |
| Pedi | Repabliki ya Afrika-Borwa | Afrika Borwa |
| Southern Ndebele | iRiphabliki yeSewula Afrika | iSewula Afrika |
| Southern Sotho | Rephaboliki ya Afrika Borwa | Afrika Borwa |
| Swazi | iRiphabhulikhi yeNingizimu Afrika | iNingizimu Afrika |
| Tsonga | Riphabliki ra Afrika Dzonga | Afrika-Dzonga |
| Tswana | Rephaboliki ya Aforika Borwa | Aforika Borwa |
| Venda | Riphabuḽiki ya Afurika Tshipembe | Afurika Tshipembe |
| Xhosa | iRiphabliki yomZantsi Afrika | uMzantsi Afrika |
| Zulu | iRiphabhuliki yaseNingizimu Afrika | iNingizimu Afrika |

And one former name:

| Language | Long form | Short form | Period |
|---|---|---|---|
| Dutch | Republiek van Zuid-Afrika | Zuid-Afrika | 1961–1983 |

South Africa's country code, ZA, is an abbreviation of this former official name, Zuid-Afrika.

== See also ==
- Languages of South Africa
