= South Africa at the Rugby World Cup =

South Africa have played at 8 of the 10 Rugby World Cup tournaments, having been unable to compete in the first two tournaments due to a sports boycott during the apartheid era, and have won 50% of tournaments in which they participated. Following the end of apartheid, they hosted the 1995 Rugby World Cup and won the tournament, they were champions again at the 2007 tournament in France. The Springboks then made history when they beat England in the Rugby World Cup 2019 in Japan despite losing a pool stage match. They again made history in 2023 when both finalists lost pool matches.

The Springboks have the most tournament wins at the Rugby World Cup – having won 4 times – although they have participated in fewer tournaments. In addition to this, they are the only rugby team to have won every World Cup final they have played in.

== By position ==
Rugby World Cup record
Year	Round	Pld	W	D	L	PF	PA	Squad
(New Zealand) (Australia) 1987	Barred from competing at the tournament due to the international sporting boycott during Apartheid							
(England) (France) (Ireland) (Scotland) (Wales) 1991	Barred from competing at the tournament due to the international sporting boycott during Apartheid							
(South Africa) 1995	Champions	6	6	0	0	144	67	Squad
(Wales) 1999	Third place	6	5	0	1	219	101	Squad
(Australia) 2003	Quarter-finals	5	3	0	2	193	89	Squad
(France) 2007	Champions	7	7	0	0	278	86	Squad
(New Zealand) 2011	Quarter-finals	5	4	0	1	175	35	Squad
(England) 2015	Third place	7	5	0	2	241	108	Squad
(Japan) 2019	Champions	7	6	0	1	262	67	Squad
(France) 2023	Champions	7	6	0	1	208	88	Squad
(Australia) 2027	Qualified							
(United States) 2031	To be determined							
Total	—	50	42	0	8	1720	641	—
Champions; Runners–up; Third place; Fourth place; Home venue

== By matches ==
=== 1995 ===
Pool A

Team	Pld	W	D	L	PF	PA	PD	Pts
South Africa	3	3	0	0	68	26	+42	9
Australia	3	2	0	1	87	41	+46	7
Canada	3	1	0	2	45	50	−5	5
Romania	3	0	0	3	14	97	−83	3

25 May 1995

South Africa	27–18	Australia
Tries: Pieter Hendriks, Joel Stransky; Con: Joel Stransky; Pen: Joel Stransky (4); Drop: Joel Stransky		Tries: Phil Kearns, Michael Lynagh; Con: Michael Lynagh; Pen: Michael Lynagh

Newlands, Cape Town
Attendance: 51 000 (capacity)
Referee: Derek Bevan (Wales)

30 May 1995

South Africa	21–8	Romania
Tries: Adriaan Richter (2); Con: Gavin Johnson; Pen: Gavin Johnson (3)		Tries: Andrei Gurănescu; Pen: Ilie Ivanciuc

Newlands, Cape Town
Attendance: 35 000
Referee: Ken McCartney (Scotland)

3 June 1995

South Africa	20–0	Canada
Tries: Adriaan Richter (2); Con: Joel Stransky (2); Pen: Joel Stransky (2)

Boet Erasmus Stadium, Port Elizabeth
Attendance: 31 000
Referee: David McHugh (Ireland)

Quarter-final

10 June 1995

South Africa	42–14	Western Samoa
Tries: Chester Williams (4), Chris Rossouw, Mark Andrews; Con: Gavin Johnson (3); Pen: Gavin Johnson (2)		Tries: Shem Tatupu, Tu Nu'uali'itia; Con: Tupo Fa'amasino (2)

Ellis Park, Johannesburg
Attendance: 52 000
Referee: Jim Fleming (Scotland)

Semi-final

17 June 1995

South Africa	19–15	France
Tries: Ruben Kruger; Con: Joel Stransky; Pen: Joel Stransky (4)		Pen: Thierry Lacroix (5)

Kings Park Stadium, Durban
Attendance: 50 000 (capacity)
Referee: Derek Bevan (Wales)

Final

24 June 1995

South Africa	15–12 (a.e.t.)	New Zealand
Pen: Joel Stransky (3); Drop: Joel Stransky (2)		Pen: Andrew Mehrtens (3); Drop: Andrew Mehrtens

Ellis Park, Johannesburg
Attendance: 65 000 (capacity)
Referee: Ed Morrison (England)

=== 1999 ===
Pool A

Team	Pld	W	D	L	PF	PA	PD	Pts
South Africa	3	3	0	0	132	35	+97	9
Scotland	3	2	0	1	120	58	+62	7
Uruguay	3	1	0	2	42	97	−55	5
Spain	3	0	0	3	18	122	−104	3

3 October 1999

Scotland	29–46	South Africa
Tries: Martin Leslie, Alan Tait; Con: Kenny Logan (2); Pen: Kenny Logan (4); Drop: Gregor Townsend		Tries: Ollie Le Roux, Deon Kayser, Joost van der Westhuizen, Robbie Fleck, Andre Venter, Brendan Venter; Con: Jannie de Beer (5); Pen: Jannie de Beer (2)

Murrayfield, Edinburgh
Attendance: 57,612
Referee: Colin Hawke (New Zealand)

10 October 1999

South Africa	47–3	Spain
Tries: André Vos (2), Anton Leonard, Pieter Muller, Bob Skinstad, Werner Swanepoel; Con: Jannie de Beer (6)		Pen: Ferran Velazco Querol

Murrayfield, Edinburgh
Attendance: 4,769
Referee: Paul Honiss (New Zealand)

15 October 1999

South Africa	39–3	Uruguay
Tries: Albert van den Berg (2), Joost van der Westhuizen, Deon Kayser, Robbie Fleck; Con: Jannie de Beer (4); Pen: Jannie de Beer (2)		Pen: Diego Aguirre

Hampden Park, Glasgow
Attendance: 3,500
Referee: Peter Marshall (Australia)

Quarter-final

24 October 1999

South Africa	44–21	England
Tries: Joost van der Westhuizen, Pieter Rossouw; Con: Jannie de Beer (2); Pen: Jannie de Beer (5); Drop: Jannie de Beer (5)		Pen: Paul Grayson (6), Jonny Wilkinson

Stade de France, Saint-Denis
Attendance: 75,000
Referee: Jim Fleming (Scotland)

Semi-final

30 October 1999

South Africa	21–27 (a.e.t)	Australia
Pen: Jannie de Beer (6); Drop: Jannie de Beer		Pen: Matthew Burke (8); Drop: Stephen Larkham

Twickenham, London
Attendance: 72,000
Referee: Derek Bevan (Wales)

Third-place play-off

4 November 1999

South Africa	22–18	New Zealand
Tries: Breyton Paulse; Con: Henry Honiball; Pen: Henry Honiball (3); Drop goals: Percy Montgomery (2)		Pen: Andrew Mehrtens (6)

Millennium Stadium, Cardiff
Attendance: 60,000
Referee: Peter Marshall (Australia)

=== 2003 ===
Pool C

Team	Pld	W	D	L	PF	PA	PD	BP	Pts	Qualification
England	4	4	0	0	255	47	+208	3	19	Quarter-finals
South Africa	4	3	0	1	184	60	+124	3	15	Quarter-finals
Samoa	4	2	0	2	138	117	+21	2	10	
Uruguay	4	1	0	3	56	255	−199	0	4	
Georgia	4	0	0	4	46	200	−154	0	0	

11 October 2003

South Africa	72–6	Uruguay
Tries: van der Westhuizen (3), van Niekerk, Botha, Delport, Fourie, Bands, Rossouw, Scholtz, Greef; Con: Koen (5), Hougaard		Pen: Aguirre (2)

Subiaco Oval, Perth
Attendance: 16,906
Referee: Paddy O'Brien (New Zealand)

18 October 2003

South Africa	6–25	England
Pen: Koen (2)		Tries: Greenwood; Con: Wilkinson; Pen: Wilkinson (4); Drop: Wilkinson (2)

Subiaco Oval, Perth
Attendance: 38,834
Referee: Peter Marshall (Australia)

24 October 2003

South Africa	46–19	Georgia
Tries: Rossouw (2), Hougaard, van Niekerk, Fourie, Botha, Burger; Con: Hougaard (4); Pen: Hougaard		Tries: Dadunashvili; Con: Jimsheladze; Pen: Jimsheladze (3), Kvirikashvili

Sydney Football Stadium, Sydney
Attendance: 34,308
Referee: Stuart Dickinson (Australia)

1 November 2003

South Africa	60–10	Samoa
Tries: van Niekerk, Muller, Hougaard, Smith, Willemse, Fourie, van der Westhuyzen, de Kock; Con: Hougaard (5), Koen (2); Pen: Hougaard; Drop: Hougaard		Tries: Palepoi; Con: Va'a; Pen: Va'a

Suncorp Stadium, Brisbane
Attendance: 48,496
Referee: Chris White (England)

Quarter-final

6 November 2003

New Zealand	29–9	South Africa
Tries: MacDonald 16' c Mealamu 59' m Rokocoko 72' m Con: MacDonald; Pen: MacDonald (3); Drop: Mauger 45'		Pen: Hougaard (3)

Telstra Dome, Melbourne
Attendance: 40,734
Referee: Tony Spreadbury (England)

=== 2007 ===
Pool A

Pos	Team	Pld	W	D	L	PF	PA	PD	B	Pts	Qualification
1	South Africa	4	4	0	0	189	47	+142	3	19	Advanced to the quarter-finals and qualified for the 2011 Rugby World Cup
2	England	4	3	0	1	108	88	+20	2	14	Advanced to the quarter-finals and qualified for the 2011 Rugby World Cup
3	Tonga	4	2	0	2	89	96	−7	1	9	Eliminated, automatic qualification for 2011 Rugby World Cup
4	Samoa	4	1	0	3	69	143	−74	1	5	
5	United States	4	0	0	4	61	142	−81	1	1	

9 September 2007
16:00

South Africa	59–7	Samoa
Tries: Habana (4) 33' m, 56' c, 66' c, 76' m Montgomery (2) 40+' c, 53' m Fourie 47' c JP Pietersen 80+' c Con: Montgomery (5/8); Pen: Montgomery (3/3) 3', 10', 15'	Report	Try: Williams 18' c Con: Williams (1/1)

Parc des Princes, Paris
Attendance: 46,575
Referee: Paul Honiss (New Zealand)

14 September 2007
21:00

England	0–36	South Africa
	Report	Tries: Smith 6' c Pietersen (2) 38' c, 64' c Con: Montgomery (3/3); Pen: Steyn (1/1) 11'; Montgomery (4/4) 36', 46', 55', 79'

Stade de France, Saint-Denis
Attendance: 77,523
Referee: Joël Jutge (France)

22 September 2007
14:00

South Africa	30–25	Tonga
Tries: Pienaar (2) 18' c, 65' m Smith 59' c Skinstad 62' m Con: Pretorius (1/1); Montgomery (1/3); Pen: Steyn (1/1) 54'; Montgomery (1/1) 76'	Report	Tries: Pulu 44' c Hufanga 70' m Vaki 72' c Con: Hola (2/3); Pen: Hola (2/3) 9', 78'

Stade Félix Bollaert, Lens
Attendance: 40,069
Referee: Wayne Barnes (England)

30 September 2007
20:00

South Africa	64–15	United States
Tries: Burger 10' c Steyn 28' c Habana (2) 35' c, 42' m van der Linde 48' c du Preez 54' c Fourie (2) 64' c, 73' c Smith 77' c Con: Montgomery (6/7); James (2/2); Pen: Montgomery (1/1) 17'	Report	Tries: Ngwenya 39' c Wyles 51' m Con: Hercus (1/2); Pen: Hercus (1/1) 20'

Stade de la Mosson, Montpellier
Attendance: 28,750
Referee: Tony Spreadbury (England)

Quarter-final

7 October 2007
15:00

South Africa	37–20	Fiji
Tries: Fourie 13' m Smit 35' m Pietersen 51' c Smith 70' c James 80' c Con: Montgomery (3/5); Pen: Steyn (1/1) 8'; Montgomery (1/2) 63'	Report	Tries: Delasau 57' c Bobo 59' c Con: Bai (2/2); Pen: Bai (2/2) 26', 44'

Stade Vélodrome, Marseille
Attendance: 55,943
Referee: Alan Lewis (Ireland)

Semi-final

14 October 2007
21:00

South Africa	37–13	Argentina
Tries: du Preez 7' c Habana (2) 32' c, 76' c Rossouw 40' c Con: Montgomery (4/4); Pen: Montgomery (3/3) 17', 71', 75'	Report	Try: M. Contepomi 45' c Con: F. Contepomi (1/1); Pen: F. Contepomi (2/4) 15', 30'

Stade de France, Saint-Denis
Attendance: 77,055
Referee: Steve Walsh (Australia)

Final

20 October 2007
21:00

England	6–15	South Africa
Pen: Wilkinson (2/2) 13', 44'	Report	Pen: Montgomery (4/4) 7', 16', 40', 51'; Steyn (1/2) 62'

Stade de France, Saint-Denis
Attendance: 80,430
Referee: Alain Rolland (Ireland)

=== 2011 ===
Pool D

Pos	Team	Pld	W	D	L	PF	PA	PD	T	B	Pts	Qualification
1	South Africa	4	4	0	0	166	24	+142	21	2	18	Advanced to the quarter-finals and qualified for the 2015 Rugby World Cup
2	Wales	4	3	0	1	180	34	+146	23	3	15	Advanced to the quarter-finals and qualified for the 2015 Rugby World Cup
3	Samoa	4	2	0	2	91	49	+42	9	2	10	Eliminated but qualified for 2015 Rugby World Cup
4	Fiji	4	1	0	3	59	167	−108	7	1	5	
5	Namibia	4	0	0	4	44	266	−222	5	0	0	

11 September 2011
20:30 NZST

South Africa	17–16	Wales
Tries: F. Steyn, Hougaard; Con: M. Steyn (2); Pen: M. Steyn	(Report)	Tries: Faletau; Con: Hook; Pen: Hook (3)

Westpac Stadium, Wellington
Attendance: 33,331
Referee: Wayne Barnes (England)

17 September 2011
18:00 NZST

South Africa	49–3	Fiji
Tries: Steenkamp; Fourie; F. Steyn; M. Steyn; Mtawarira; Rossouw; Con: M. Steyn; Pen: M. Steyn, F. Steyn	(Report)	Pen: Bai

Westpac Stadium, Wellington
Attendance: 33,262
Referee: Romain Poite (France)

22 September 2011
20:30 NZST

South Africa	87–0	Namibia
Tries: Aplon (2), Habana, Fourie, F. Steyn, M. Steyn, de Jongh (2), Hougaard (2); Con: M. Steyn, Pienaar; Pen: M. Steyn	(Report)

North Harbour Stadium, Auckland
Attendance: 26,839
Referee: George Clancy (Ireland)

30 September 2011
20:00 NZST

South Africa	13–5	Samoa
Tries: Habana; Con: M. Steyn (2); Pen: M. Steyn, F. Steyn	(Report)	Tries: Stowers

North Harbour Stadium, Auckland
Attendance: 29,734
Referee: Nigel Owens (Wales)

Quarter-final

9 October 2011

South Africa	9–11	Australia
Pen: M. Steyn (2), Drop: M. Steyn	(Report)	Tries: Horwill, Pen: O'Connor (2)

Regional Stadium, Wellington
Attendance: 29,734
Referee: Bryce Lawrence (New Zealand)

=== 2015 ===
Pool B

Pos	Team	Pld	W	D	L	PF	PA	PD	T	B	Pts	Qualification
1	South Africa	4	3	0	1	176	56	+120	23	4	16	Advanced to the quarter-finals and qualified for the 2019 Rugby World Cup
2	Scotland	4	3	0	1	136	93	+43	14	2	14	Advanced to the quarter-finals and qualified for the 2019 Rugby World Cup
3	Japan	4	3	0	1	98	100	−2	9	0	12	Eliminated but qualified for 2019 Rugby World Cup
4	Samoa	4	1	0	3	69	124	−55	7	2	6	
5	United States	4	0	0	4	50	156	−106	5	0	0	

19 September 2015
16:45

South Africa	32–34	Japan
Try: Louw 18' c B. Du Plessis 33' m De Jager 44' c Strauss 62' c Con: Lambie (2/3) 19', 45'; Pollard (1/1) 63'; Pen: Lambie (1/1) 57'; Pollard (1/1) 73'	Report	Try: Leitch 30' c Goromaru 69' c Hesketh 80' m Con: Goromaru (2/3) 31', 70'; Pen: Goromaru (5/6) 8', 43', 49', 53', 60'

Brighton Community Stadium, Brighton
Attendance: 29,290
Referee: Jérôme Garcès (France)

26 September 2015
16:45

South Africa	46–6	Samoa
Try: Pietersen (3) 15' m, 47' c, 78' m Burger 58' m Brits 71' m Habana 80' c Con: Pollard (1/4) 48'; Lambie (1/2) 80'; Pen: Pollard (4/4) 2', 19', 24', 39'	Report	Pen: Stanley (2/5) 9', 12'

Villa Park, Birmingham
Attendance: 39,526
Referee: Wayne Barnes (England)

3 October 2015
16:45

South Africa	34–16	Scotland
Try: Burger 13' c Pietersen 38' c Habana 73' m Con: Pollard (2/3) 13', 40'; Pen: Pollard (4/4) 17', 27', 62', 68'; Drop: Pollard 51'	Report	Try: Seymour 49' c Con: Laidlaw (1/1) 50'; Pen: Laidlaw (2/3) 30', 45'; Weir (1/1) 60'

St. James' Park, Newcastle
Attendance: 50,900
Referee: Nigel Owens (Wales)

7 October 2015
16:45

South Africa	64–0	United States
Try: De Allende 7' c Penalty try 27' c Habana (3) 42' c, 59' c, 61' c Du Plessis 47' m Louw (2) 53' c, 69' m Kriel 73' m Mvovo 80' c Con: Pollard (4/5) 8', 28', 42', 54'; Steyn (3/5) 60', 63', 80'	Report

Olympic Stadium, London
Attendance: 54,658
Referee: Pascal Gaüzère (France)

Quarter-final

17 October 2015
16:00 BST (UTC+01)

South Africa	23–19	Wales
Try: Du Preez 75' m Con: Pollard (0/1); Pen: Pollard (5/7) 9', 13', 17', 21', 62'; Drop: Pollard 52'	Report	Try: G. Davies 18' c Con: Biggar (1/1) 19'; Pen: Biggar (3/4) 15', 47', 64'; Drop: Biggar 40'

Twickenham Stadium, London
Attendance: 79,572
Referee: Wayne Barnes (England)

Semi-final

24 October 2015
16:00 BST (UTC+01)

South Africa	18–20	New Zealand
Pen: Pollard (5/5) 3', 11', 21', 39', 58'; Lambie (1/1) 69'	Report	Try: Kaino 6' c Barrett 52' c Con: Carter (2/2) 9', 53'; Pen: Carter (1/2) 60'; Drop: Carter 46'

Twickenham Stadium, London
Attendance: 80,090
Referee: Jérôme Garcès (France)

Bronze final

30 October 2015
20:00 GMT (UTC+00)

South Africa	24–13	Argentina
Try: Pietersen 6' c Etzebeth 43' m Con: Pollard (1/2) 7'; Pen: Pollard (4/5) 14', 33', 40', 48'	Report	Try: Orlandi 80' c Con: Sánchez (1/1) 80'; Pen: Sánchez (1/1) 52'; Drop: Sánchez 42'

Olympic Stadium, London
Attendance: 55,925
Referee: John Lacey (Ireland)

=== 2019 ===
Pool B

Pos	Team	Pld	W	D	L	PF	PA	PD	T	B	Pts	Qualification
1	New Zealand	4	3	1	0	157	22	+135	22	2	16	Advanced to the quarter-finals and qualified for the 2023 Rugby World Cup
2	South Africa	4	3	0	1	185	36	+149	27	3	15	Advanced to the quarter-finals and qualified for the 2023 Rugby World Cup
3	Italy	4	2	1	1	98	78	+20	14	2	12	Eliminated but qualified for 2023 Rugby World Cup
4	Namibia	4	0	1	3	34	175	−141	3	0	2	
5	Canada	4	0	1	3	14	177	−163	2	0	2	

21 September 2019
18:45 JST (UTC+09)

New Zealand	23–13	South Africa
Try: Bridge 24' c S. Barrett 27' c Con: Mo'unga (2/2) 25', 28'; Pen: Mo'unga (2/3) 23', 67'; B. Barrett (1/1) 72'	Report	Try: Du Toit 48' c Con: Pollard (1/1) 49'; Pen: Pollard (1/2) 2'; Drop: Pollard (1/1) 59'

International Stadium Yokohama, Yokohama
Attendance: 63,649
Referee: Jérôme Garcès (France)

28 September 2019
18:45 JST (UTC+09)

(1 BP) South Africa	57–3	Namibia
Try: Mbonambi (2) 10' c, 17' c Louw 15' m Mapimpi (2) 27' m, 54' c Am 42' c Gelant 48' c Kolisi 59' m Brits 64' c Con: E. Jantjies (6/9) 11', 19', 43', 50', 55', 66'	Report	Pen: Loubser (1/2) 24'

City of Toyota Stadium, Toyota
Attendance: 36,449
Referee: Mathieu Raynal (France)

4 October 2019
18:45 JST (UTC+09)

(1 BP) South Africa	49–3	Italy
Try: Kolbe (2) 5' c, 52' m Mbonambi 26' c Am 57' c Mapimpi 67' c Snyman 75 m' Marx 80+2' m Con: Pollard (4/7) 6', 27', 59', 68'; Pen: Pollard (2/2) 11', 50'	Report	Pen: Allan (1/1) 8'

Shizuoka Stadium Ecopa, Fukuroi
Attendance: 44,148
Referee: Wayne Barnes (England)

8 October 2019
19:15 JST (UTC+09)

(1 BP) South Africa	66–7	Canada
Try: de Allende 3' c Nkosi 6' m Reinach (3) 10' c, 18' c, 21' c Gelant 28' c Steyn 40'+1 c Brits 55' c Willemse 66' c Malherbe 73' m Con: E. Jantjies (8/10) 3', 12', 20', 22', 29', 40'+2, 56', 68'	Report	Try: Heaton 46' c Con: Nelson (1/1) 48'

Kobe Misaki Stadium, Kobe
Attendance: 28,014
Referee: Luke Pearce (England)

Quarter-final

20 October 2019
19:15 JST (UTC+09)

Japan	3–26	South Africa
Pen: Tamura (1/1) 20'	Report	Try: Mapimpi (2) 4' m, 70' m de Klerk 66' c Con: Pollard (1/3) 66'; Pen: Pollard (3/4) 44', 49', 64'

Tokyo Stadium, Chōfu
Attendance: 48,831
Referee: Wayne Barnes (England)

Semi-final

27 October 2019
18:00 JST (UTC+09)

Wales	16–19	South Africa
Try: Adams 65' c Con: Halfpenny (1/1) 66'; Pen: Biggar (3/3) 18', 39', 46'	Report	Try: de Allende 57' c Con: Pollard (1/1) 58'; Pen: Pollard (4/4) 15', 20', 35', 76'

International Stadium Yokohama, Yokohama
Attendance: 67,750
Referee: Jérôme Garcès (France)

Final

2 November 2019
18:00 JST (UTC+09)

England	12–32	South Africa
Pen: Farrell (4/5) 23', 35', 52', 60'	Report	Try: Mapimpi 66' c Kolbe 74' c Con: Pollard (2/2) 67', 75'; Pen: Pollard (6/8) 10', 26', 39', 43', 46', 58'

International Stadium Yokohama, Yokohama
Attendance: 70,103
Referee: Jérôme Garcès (France)

== Overall record ==
Overall record against all nations in the World Cup:

Country	Played	Wins	Draws	Losses	For	Against	+/-	Winning percent
England	6	5	-	1	149	79	+70	83
Samoa	5	5	-	-	220	42	+178	100
New Zealand	6	3	-	3	89	113	-24	50
Wales	3	3	-	-	59	51	+8	100
Scotland	3	3	-	-	98	48	+50	100
Australia	3	1	-	2	57	56	+1	33
Argentina	2	2	-	-	61	26	+35	100
Canada	2	2	-	-	86	7	+79	100
Fiji	2	2	-	-	86	23	+63	100
France	2	2	-	-	48	43	+5	100
Namibia	2	2	-	-	144	3	+141	100
Romania	2	2	-	-	97	8	+89	100
Tonga	2	2	-	-	79	43	+36	100
United States	2	2	-	-	128	15	+113	100
Uruguay	2	2	-	-	111	9	+102	100
Japan	2	1	-	1	58	37	+21	50
Georgia	1	1	-	-	46	19	+27	100
Italy	1	1	-	-	49	3	+46	100
Spain	1	1	-	-	47	3	+44	100
Ireland	1	-	-	1	8	13	-5	0
Total	50	42	0	8	1720	641	+1079	84
