= National Forensic DNA Database of South Africa =

Criminal Law (Forensic Procedures) Amendment Act, 2013

Parliament of South Africa
- Citation: Act No. 37 of 2013
- Enacted by: Parliament of South Africa
- Assented to: 23 January 2014
- Commenced: 31 January 2015
- Status: In force

The National Forensic DNA Database of South Africa (NFDD) is a national DNA database used in law enforcement in South Africa. The Criminal Law (Forensic Procedures) Amendment Act No. 37 of 2013 (the "DNA Act") provides for the expansion and administration of such a database in South Africa, enabling the South African Police Service (SAPS) to match forensic DNA profiles derived from samples collected at crime scenes with forensic DNA profiles of offenders convicted of, and suspects arrested for, offences listed in a new Schedule 8 of the amended Criminal Procedure Act of 1977.

== Before the DNA Act: DCID ==
DNA profiling has been used in South African law enforcement since 1998, albeit without a legal framework prior to the commencement of the DNA Act. The DNA Criminal Intelligence Database (DCID) was developed by SAPS and is administered by the Biology Unit of the SAPS Forensic Science Laboratory (FSL).

The repository of DNA Profiles held by the FSL prior to the commencement of the DNA Act comprises two indices, namely a Casework Index containing forensic DNA profiles derived from biological samples collected from crime scenes and a Reference Index containing forensic DNA profiles of known people, including victims, suspects, volunteers and personnel. The Criminal Procedure Act of 1977 currently prevents DNA samples from being taken from convicted offenders. The DNA profiles in the DCID are generated by analysing an AmpFlSTR Profiler Plus STR multiplex system of 9 different STR loci (D3S1358, vWA, FGA, D8S1179, D21S11, D18S51, D5S818, D13S317 and D7S820) plus Amelogenin for sex determination. There were approximately 80,000 DNA profiles on the DCID in 2007, with the number increasing to approximately 180,000 by late 2013.

== DNA Act: NFDD ==
DNA should be the first thing any detective thinks about. There is always a possibility that the suspect has been injured, that urine and spit could be at the scene. It's vital to secure that evidence. The first thing I would do is cordon off a crime scene and get forensics in. Nobody must be allowed onto that crime scene.
It is better than fingerprints. With DNA, there is no doubt. I believe this bill is fantastic. They must have the DNA profile of every person who has been arrested. This could have prevented more people from being murdered.

— Former high profile SAPS investigator Piet Byleveld

The Criminal Law (Forensic Procedures) Amendment Act No. 37 of 2013 (the "DNA Act") provides for the expansion, regulation and administration of a national DNA database known as the National Forensic DNA Database of South Africa (NFDD). The initial Criminal Law (Forensic Procedures) Amendment Bill drafted in 2008 was tabled in Parliament in 2009 and subsequently split into two separate bills.

The Criminal Law (Forensic Procedures) Amendment Bill [B2–2009], dealing with fingerprints and other body-prints, was assented to in 2010 and came into effect on 18 January 2013. A separate bill unofficially known as the "DNA Bill" was re-introduced to Parliament in May 2013. It addresses various concerns that arose regarding the initial bill, including those relating to human rights issues. The final version of the DNA Bill, namely the Criminal Law (Forensic Procedures) Amendment Bill [B9D–2013], was passed by the National Assembly on 12 November 2013, and was assented to by President Jacob Zuma on 23 January 2014. The commencement date of the DNA Act is 31 January 2015.

The DNA Act provides inter alia for:

- the amendment of the South African Police Service Act of 1995 to facilitate the establishment and regulation of the NFDD
- the taking of specified bodily samples from certain categories of persons for the purposes of forensic DNA analysis
- the conditions under which the samples or forensic DNA profiles derived from the samples may be retained or the periods within which they must be destroyed
- the use of forensic DNA profiles in the investigation of crime and the use of such profiles in proving the innocence or guilt of persons before or during a prosecution or the exoneration of convicted persons
- assistance in the identification of missing persons and unidentified human remains

The NFDD comprises six indices containing forensic DNA profiles, namely a Crime Scene Index, an Arrestee Index, a Convicted Offender (CO) index, an Investigative Index, an Elimination Index and a Missing Persons and Unidentified Human Remains Index. Mandatory DNA sampling applies to persons convicted of, and persons arrested for, offences listed in a new Schedule 8 of the amended Criminal Procedure Act of 1977. The offences listed in Schedule 8 may be amended after the initial implementation phase which takes into account capacity constraints. The DNA profiles in the NFDD are generated by analysing 15 different STR loci plus Amelogenin for sex determination.

Different retention frameworks apply to each the six different indices. The Crime Scene Index contains forensic DNA profiles obtained from all crime scene samples (biological evidence collected from crime scenes) which will be held on the NFDD indefinitely. The Arrestee Index and Convicted Offender Index contains forensic DNA profiles of all persons arrested or convicted, as the case may be, of a Schedule 8 offence which range from rape and murder to burglary. Forensic DNA Profiles entered into the Arrestee Index will either be migrated to the Convicted Offender Index upon conviction, where they will be held indefinitely, or removed within three years if the arrest does not result in a conviction. Forensic DNA profiles obtained from volunteers with informed consent will be held under the Investigative Index and will be removed from the NFDD within 3 months of the case being finalised.

The repository of DNA profiles held by the state FSL was expected to be transferred to the NFDD within 3 months of the DNA database being operational. In 2013, the FSL was investigating implementing the Combined DNA Index System, which is the database and software developed by the FBI.

The DNA Act is subject to a five-year implementation plan which takes into account new training and equipment requirements.

== DNA Project ==
When the Bill is actually promulgated, only then will I breathe a transitory sigh of relief, because that will be when the real work begins. While the law may look good on paper, my mission is and has always been to see it translate into actual crime deterrence and reduction. Only when I see its effective implementation will I honestly say that we, as a team, have made a difference.

— Vanessa Lynch, founder and executive director of the DNA Project

As in Brazil, families of crime victims in South Africa have successfully campaigned for the establishment of a national forensic DNA database. The DNA Project, a non-profit organisation, is an advocacy initiative founded by attorney Vanessa Lynch following the unsolved murder of Lynch's father, John Lynch, in 2004.

The DNA Project advocates the establishment and expansion of a national forensic DNA database and hence earlier identification of criminal suspects. It has campaigned for the passing of the DNA Bill, donated laboratory equipment to the FSL, funded the UK Forensic Science Service's diagnostic review of South Africa's FSL, initiated DNA forensic awareness training programs, and developed a post-graduate forensic analyst qualification.

== See also ==
- Criminal Law Amendment Act (South Africa)
- Criminal procedure in South Africa
- Biometrics use by the South African government
