= South African hacker history =

A brief history of computer hacking in South Africa.

== 1990 ==
Activists are trapped by BOSS agents who use ATM autotellers to monitor transactions. IBM is now the subject of an ongoing court case for its active support of the apartheid regime.

== 1991 ==
Cape Educational Computer Society (CECS) becomes the first to advocate free software culture in South Africa. Many hackers gain their first experience of online world via Douglas Reeler's modem. Also in 1991, Kagenna Magazine publishes an article on Cyberpunk by Dr Tim Leary, the first time the word is mentioned in print in South Africa.

== 1994 ==
A right-wing hacker attempts to sabotage election results by hacking into the computers processing election results of South Africas first democratic election.

== 1998 ==
Police arrest a teenage boy from Rondebosch who hacked through all the security features of South African telecommunications company Telkom's computer system but apparently did no damage.

The DA party website is defaced by a hacker.

== 1999 ==
Hackers break into South Africa's official statistics website, replacing economic information with critical comments about the national telephone company, Telkom.

== 2003 ==
Akadev a Bishops boy aged 17 Crashes ABSA bank Stealing clients credentials and over R500k. He then contacted ABSA and told them what he has done and how to fix this issue. They did not take this lightly and he was sentenced to 3 years services working for Cyber Security Research Lab South Africa..

== 2004 ==
A group of computer hackers calling themselves "Spykids" strikes 45 Cape Town business websites and defaces their home pages.

== 2005 ==
"Team Evil", a group of Moroccan hackers, defaces 250 South African websites on the afternoon of 8 January, with anti-American propaganda.

== 2006 ==
First National Bank, Standard and Absa banks are the targets of several successful online attacks. The financial institutions report that no less than 10 bank accounts have been hacked.By akadev an ex Bishops student. The value of the damages caused by the attack is estimated at 80.000 dollars.

== 2008 ==
H.O.Z, currently the largest South African hacker community goes online, and quickly gains a reputation for bypassing local cell network internet restrictions. Although authorities have been unable to pin point the master minds behind the incidents, S.A. anti-cyber terrorism, vows to stay tunes to its community members and hopes one day to put a stop to these elite members of its hacking community, they will be paying close attention to its site owner EVILWez.

South African Minister for Finance and Economic Development, announces 32 arrests in connection with more than 80 separate fraud counts related to spyware and the loss of (13m pounds) R130m.

== 2009 ==
Hackers expose corrupt business practice in the banking system - a confidential document detailing information about South African banks is published by Wikileaks.

== 2010 ==
The second Live Hacking 2010 South Africa ethical hacking workshop was held in Pretoria.

Courses in ethical hacking are offered.

Gauteng's department of local government's website is hacked by CeCen Hack Team who appear to be a radical Islamic group

HackingStats.com an online resource "monitoring and documenting hacked South African-based websites" goes online.

== 2011 ==
Police unit, The Hawks announce they are on the verge of making further arrests in connection with the a "multi-million rand cyber raid" on the Land Bank over the Christmas season.

== 2012 ==
Three government websites were hacked in December by a lone activist apparently angered at South Africa's support for the Saharawi Arab Democratic Republic in Western Sahara.

== 2013 ==
"South Africa needs to be saved and freed from corruption", says Team GhostShell, but luckily it has assembled a "strong force" of hacktivists equal to the task. That force will now break into government information vaults and bring to light the evidence that will reveal corruption and nefarious doings."

Through a series of tweets 'data dump' using the account @DomainerAnon, explained that they hacked into the website “for the 34 miners killed during clashes with police in Marikana on August 16, 2012”.
