= South Africa (disambiguation) =

South Africa is a country in Southern Africa.

South Africa may also refer to:

== Places ==
- South African Republic (1852–1902), a landlocked independent Boer republic in Southern Africa
- Southern Africa, the southernmost region of the African continent
- Union of South Africa (1910–1961), the predecessor of the current South Africa

== Arts and entertainment ==
- "South Africa" (song), a song by Ian Gillan
- "South Africa" (The Apprentice), a 2019 television episode
- "South Africa" (The Goodies), a 1975 television episode
- "South Africa", a 2021 song by Baby Keem from The Melodic Blue

== Other uses ==
- LNER Class A4 4488 Union of South Africa, a preserved British steam locomotive
- 45571 South Africa, a British LMS Jubilee Class locomotive

== See also ==
- South African (disambiguation)
- List of South Africans
- South African Texas, a bridge bidding convention
