= Freightdynamics =

Subsidiary of Transnet

- Company type: Public company; subsidiary of a state-owned enterprise SOE
- Industry: Trucking logistics
- Headquarters: Parktown
- Key people: Hendrick Modie, CEO; Deidre Smith, Company Secretary; Werner Vermuelen, Marketing Executive; Sydney Madiba, Human Resources Executive; Eghshaan Khan, IT Executive
- Products: Road freight transport services
- Revenue: ~
- Number of employees: ~
- Website: http://www.freightdynamics.co.za/

Freightdynamics is a subsidiary of South Africa's state-owned transport giant Transnet.

The company operates four main terminals: Johannesburg, Cape Town, Port Elizabeth and Durban.

== See also ==
- Intermodal freight transport
