= South African Rugby Legends Association =

The South African Rugby Legends Association (SARLA or SA Rugby Legends) is a non-profit organisation operating in South Africa. It is composed of former Springboks and Provincial rugby union players and provides a platform from which retired professional rugby players can make a meaningful contribution to the growth and development of rugby in South Africa and beyond. The objective of the association is to raise money in aid of charitable causes and to provide sports coaching and life skills training to youngsters from previously disadvantaged areas in the country. SARLA / SA Rugby Legends also runs the South African Rugby Union (SARU) endorsed sustainable development rugby programme named Vuka.

== History ==
Founded in 2001, the South African Rugby Legends Association is a registered non-profit company (NPC) with two complementary objectives: Developing rugby at the grassroots level through our Vuka Rugby programme and our national Iqhawe week tournament, as well as supporting the needs and interests of former professional rugby players in South Africa. The South African Rugby Legends Association was started by South African entrepreneur and Executive Chairman of Richmark Holdings, Gavin Varejes. Since the inception of SARLA, the organisation has made a massive contribution to the development of rugby in previously disadvantaged areas around the country, as well as unearthing new talent that may have not had the opportunity to grow in the game. Two prime examples are Springbok and Harlequins prop Babalwa Latsha (the first SA women to earn a professional rugby contract) and current Blitz Bok star Zain Davids. The Vuka Rugby programme and Iqhawe Week has also provided a pathway for young talent to succeed not only on the rugby field but off the field.

== Current Legends in SARLA ==
The following former rugby players are an instrumental part of the organisation:

- John Smit
- Gary Teichmann
- Jean De Villiers
- Bryan Habana
- Lwazi Mvovo
- Mac Masina
- Marc Watson
- Percy Montgomery
- Hanyani Shimange
- Dale Santon
- Kabamba Floors
- Pat Lambie
- Bakkies Botha
- Schalk Brits
- Wayne Fyvie
- Brad Macleod-Henderson
- Dick Muir
- Butch James
- Joel Stransky
- JP Pietersen
- Odwa Ndungane
- Akhona Ndungane

== SA Rugby Legends Iqhawe week ==
Iqhawe Week is South Africa's premier rugby development tournament for u15 boys and girls. The first Iqhawe Week was held in Cape Town in September 2013, as a joint venture between the SA Rugby Legends and the South African Rugby Union. The aim was to create a pathway for players from new, introductory, small, rural, lower-league and non-traditional rugby schools to participate in a tournament equal in stature to the National Craven Week and Grant Khomo Weeks. Players begin playing rugby in the SA Rugby Legends Vuka programme move into the regional Legends Cup tournaments and the top players in each province then get selected to play in the Hollywood Foundation Iqhawe week. Numerous players from the Hollywood Foundation Iqhawe week have gone on to play provincial rugby and earn degrees while participating in the Varsity Cup. 20 players from the 2022 Hollywood Foundation Iqhawe week earned scholarships to more established rugby schools in 2023. One of the most recent success stories is Mawande Mdanda who participated in the 2018 Iqhawe Week. Mdanda went onto received a bursary to attend Maritzburg College, where he played in the First XV, was selected for the 2020 Sharks Craven Week team . He received a junior contract with the Vodacom Blue Bulls and was part of the squad that won all three SA junior tournaments – U19 / U20 / U21 – in 2022. In 2023 he was selected to the Junior Springbok squad and played in the Junior World Championships of that year.

== Vuka Rugby Development Program ==
SARLA started a grassroots rugby development programme called Vuka (awakening or wake up in the Zulu language) in 2008. Since then, over 30 000 disadvantaged youngsters per year, all over the country, have been given an opportunity to develop rugby and life skills by partaking in the programme.

== Press Coverage ==
SARLA regularly features in the South African online and printed press. Selected press coverage includes:

- Coverage of SARLA Sports Challenge in News Online – Going Places
- Coverage of SARLA's support for Joost van der Westhuizen – IOL News
- Coverage of SARLA's support for Joost van der Westhuizen – ZAPlurk
- Coverage of SARLA's support for Joost van der Westhuizen – Sarie Magazine

== Contribution to Charity ==
SARLA and Gavin Varejes donate time and funds to a variety of charities. Since the beginning this has been one of the core values of the organisation to give back to those in need. This includes supporting fundraising efforts of charitable organisations, contributing to feeding schemes, food parcel handouts across the country during the height of the Covid pandemic and highlighting other important social causes.
