= 1965 South Africa rugby union tour of Scotland and Ireland =

Summary
P	W	D	L
Total
5	0	1	4
Test match
2	0	0	2
Opponent
P	W	D	L
Ireland
1	0	0	1
Scotland
1	0	0	1

The 1965 South Africa rugby union tour of Scotland and Ireland was a short series of matches played in April 1965 by South Africa national rugby union team.

It was not a successful tour. The Springboks, lost both test matches against Ireland and Scotland.

== Matches of the tour ==
Scores and results list South Africa's points tally first.

Opposing Team	For	Against	Date	Venue	Status
Combined Province	8	8	3 April 1965		Tour match
Combined Universities	10	12	6 April 1965		Tour match
Ireland	6	9	10 April 1965	Lansdowne Road, Dublin	Test match
Combined Scottish Districts	8	16	13 April 1965		Tour match
Scotland	5	8	17 April 1965	Murrayfield, Edinburgh	Test match
