= South African =

South African may relate to:

- The nation of South Africa
- South Africans
- South African Airways
- South African English
- South African people
- Languages of South Africa
- Southern Africa

== See also ==
- South Africa (disambiguation)
