= 1996 Tri Nations Series =

- Date: 6 July – 10 August 1996
- Countries: Australia; New Zealand; South Africa

Final positions
- Champions: New Zealand (1st title)
- Bledisloe Cup: New Zealand

Tournament statistics
- Matches played: 6
- Tries scored: 20 (3.33 per match)
- Attendance: 270,373 (45,062 per match)
- Top scorer(s): Andrew Mehrtens (69)
- Most tries: Justin Marshall (2)

The 1996 Tri Nations Series was the inaugural edition of the annual Southern Hemisphere rugby union competition, organised by SANZAR, featuring the men's national teams of Australia, New Zealand and South Africa. It was contested between 6 July to 10 August 1996. New Zealand won all four of their Test matches to claim the inaugural title, as well as retaining the Bledisloe Cup won the previous year for their two wins over Australia.

== Table ==
Pos	Team	Pld	W	D	L	PF	PA	PD	TF	TA	TB	LB	Pts
1	New Zealand (C)	4	4	0	0	122	60	+62	10	5	1	0	17
2	South Africa	4	1	0	3	70	84	−14	5	5	0	2	6
3	Australia	4	1	0	3	71	119	−48	5	10	0	2	6

Source: BBC Sport
(C) Champion

== Results ==
=== Round 1 ===
6 July 1996
14:35 NZST (UTC+12)

(1 BP) New Zealand	43–6	Australia
Try: Brooke; Cullen; Jones; Lomu; Marshall; Wilson; Con: Mehrtens (2); Pen: Mehrtens (3)	Report	Pen: Burke (2)

Athletic Park, Wellington
Attendance: 39,523
Referee: Ed Morrison (England)

FB	15	Christian Cullen
RW	14	Jeff Wilson
OC	13	Frank Bunce
IC	12	Walter Little
LW	11	Jonah Lomu
FH	10	Andrew Mehrtens
SH	9	Justin Marshall
N8	8	Zinzan Brooke
OF	7	Josh Kronfeld
BF	6	Michael Jones
RL	5	Robin Brooke
LL	4	Ian Jones
TP	3	Olo Brown
HK	2	Sean Fitzpatrick (c)
LP	1	Craig Dowd
Replacements:
WG	16	Eric Rush
CE	17	Scott McLeod
SH	18	Jon Preston
LK	19	Blair Larsen
PR	20	Bull Allen
HK	21	Norm Hewitt
Coach:
John Hart

FB	15	Matt Burke
RW	14	David Campese
OC	13	Joe Roff
IC	12	Tim Horan
LW	11	Ben Tune
FH	10	Scott Bowen
SH	9	Sam Payne
N8	8	Michael Brial
OF	7	David Wilson
BF	6	Owen Finegan
RL	5	John Eales (c)
LL	4	Garrick Morgan
TP	3	Dan Crowley
HK	2	Michael Foley
LP	1	Richard Harry
Replacements:
CE	16	Stephen Larkham
FH	17	Pat Howard
SH	18	George Gregan
FL	19	Daniel Manu
PR	20	Andrew Heath
HK	21	Marco Caputo
Coach:
Greg Smith

Notes:

- New Zealand's 43 points was the most they had scored against Australia.
- New Zealand retained the Bledisloe Cup.

=== Round 2 ===
13 July 1996
20:00 AEST (UTC+10)

Australia	21–16	South Africa (1 BP)
Try: Roff; Horan; Con: Burke; Pen: Burke (3)	Report	Try: Hendriks; Con: Honiball; Pen: Honiball (2); Joubert

Sydney Football Stadium, Sydney
Attendance: 41,850
Referee: Tony Spreadbury (England)

FB	15	Matt Burke
RW	14	David Campese
OC	13	Joe Roff
IC	12	Tim Horan
LW	11	Ben Tune
FH	10	Pat Howard
SH	9	George Gregan
N8	8	Michael Brial
OF	7	David Wilson
BF	6	Daniel Manu
RL	5	John Eales (c)
LL	4	Garrick Morgan
TP	3	Dan Crowley
HK	2	Michael Foley
LP	1	Andrew Heath
Replacements:
CE	16	Daniel Herbert
FH	17	Scott Bowen
SH	18	Sam Payne
FL	19	Owen Finegan
PR	20	Richard Harry
HK	21	Marco Caputo
Coach:
Greg Smith

FB	15	André Joubert
RW	14	James Small
OC	13	Japie Mulder
IC	12	Brendan Venter
LW	11	Pieter Hendriks
FH	10	Henry Honiball
SH	9	Joost van der Westhuizen
N8	8	Gary Teichmann
OF	7	Ruben Kruger
BF	6	Francois Pienaar (c)
RL	5	Mark Andrews
LL	4	Johan Ackermann
TP	3	Marius Hurter
HK	2	John Allan
LP	1	Os du Randt
Replacements:
WG	16	Justin Swart
FH	17	Joel Stransky
SH	18	Johan Roux
PR	19	Balie Swart
HK	20	Naka Drotské
LK	21	Steve Atherton
Coach:
Andre Markgraaff

Notes:

- This was South Africa's first defeat in 17 Tests, and ended their 15 Test win-streak, spanning 1 year, 279 days.

=== Round 3 ===
20 July 1996
14:35 NZST (UTC+12)

New Zealand	15–11	South Africa (1 BP)
Pen: Mehrtens (5)	Report	Try: Joubert; Pen: Stransky (2)

Lancaster Park, Christchurch
Attendance: 39,000
Referee: Ray Megson (Scotland)

FB	15	Christian Cullen
RW	14	Jeff Wilson
OC	13	Frank Bunce
IC	12	Walter Little
LW	11	Jonah Lomu
FH	10	Andrew Mehrtens
SH	9	Justin Marshall
N8	8	Zinzan Brooke
OF	7	Josh Kronfeld
BF	6	Michael Jones
RL	5	Robin Brooke
LL	4	Ian Jones
TP	3	Olo Brown
HK	2	Sean Fitzpatrick (c)
LP	1	Craig Dowd
Replacements:
WG	16	Eric Rush
CE	17	Scott McLeod
SH	18	Jon Preston
LK	19	Blair Larsen
PR	20	Bull Allen
HK	21	Norm Hewitt
Coach:
John Hart

FB	15	André Joubert
RW	14	James Small
OC	13	Japie Mulder
IC	12	Brendan Venter
LW	11	Pieter Hendriks
FH	10	Joel Stransky
SH	9	Johan Roux
N8	8	Gary Teichmann
OF	7	Ruben Kruger
BF	6	Francois Pienaar (c)
RL	5	Mark Andrews
LL	4	Johan Ackermann
TP	3	Marius Hurter
HK	2	John Allan
LP	1	Os du Randt
Replacements:
WG	16	Justin Swart
CE	17	Danie van Schalkwyk
SH	18	Joost van der Westhuizen
LK	19	Steve Atherton
PR	20	Balie Swart
HK	21	Naka Drotské
Coach:
Andre Markgraaff

=== Round 4 ===
27 July 1996
20:00 AEST (UTC+10)

(1 BP) Australia	25–32	New Zealand
Try: Burke; Gregan; Pen: Burke (5)	Report	Try: Bunce; Marshall; Con: Mehrtens (2); Pen: Mehrtens (6)

Lang Park, Brisbane
Attendance: 39,000
Referee: Jim Fleming (Scotland)

FB	15	Matt Burke
RW	14	David Campese
OC	13	Joe Roff
IC	12	Richard Tombs
LW	11	Ben Tune
FH	10	Pat Howard
SH	9	George Gregan
N8	8	Michael Brial
OF	7	David Wilson
BF	6	Daniel Manu
RL	5	John Eales (c)
LL	4	Garrick Morgan
TP	3	Andrew Heath
HK	2	Michael Foley
LP	1	Richard Harry
Replacements:
CE	16	Daniel Herbert
FH	17	Scott Bowen
SH	18	Sam Payne
N8	19	Tim Gavin
PR	20	Dan Crowley
HK	21	Marco Caputo
Coach:
Greg Smith

FB	15	Christian Cullen
RW	14	Jeff Wilson
OC	13	Frank Bunce
IC	12	Walter Little
LW	11	Jonah Lomu
FH	10	Andrew Mehrtens
SH	9	Justin Marshall
N8	8	Zinzan Brooke
OF	7	Josh Kronfeld
BF	6	Michael Jones
RL	5	Robin Brooke
LL	4	Ian Jones
TP	3	Olo Brown
HK	2	Sean Fitzpatrick (c)
LP	1	Craig Dowd
Replacements:
FB	16	Glen Osborne
CE	17	Scott McLeod
SH	18	Jon Preston
LK	19	Blair Larsen
PR	20	Bull Allen
HK	21	Norm Hewitt
Coach:
John Hart

Notes:

- This win sealed New Zealand's maiden Tri Nations Series title with one Test to spare.

=== Round 5 ===
3 August 1996
17:00 SAST (UTC+02)

South Africa	25–19	Australia (1 BP)
Try: Stransky; Con: Stransky; Pen: Stransky (6)	Report	Try: Tune; Con: Eales; Pen: Burke; Eales (3)

Free State Stadium, Bloemfontein
Attendance: 60,000
Referee: Brian Stirling (Ireland)

FB	15	James Small
RW	14	Justin Swart
OC	13	Japie Mulder
IC	12	Brendan Venter
LW	11	Pieter Hendriks
FH	10	Joel Stransky
SH	9	Johan Roux
N8	8	Gary Teichmann
OF	7	Ruben Kruger
BF	6	Francois Pienaar
RL	5	Mark Andrews
LL	4	Johan Ackermann
TP	3	Balie Swart
HK	2	John Allan
LP	1	Os du Randt
Replacements:
CE	16	Danie van Schalkwyk
FH	17	Vlok Cilliers
SH	18	Joost van der Westhuizen
LK	19	Hannes Strydom
PR	20	Dawie Theron
HK	21	Henry Tromp
Coach:
Andre Markgraaff

FB	15	Matt Burke
RW	14	David Campese
OC	13	Daniel Herbert
IC	12	Pat Howard
LW	11	Ben Tune
FH	10	Scott Bowen
SH	9	George Gregan
N8	8	Tim Gavin
OF	7	David Wilson
BF	6	Michael Brial
RL	5	John Eales (c)
LL	4	John Welborn
TP	3	Andrew Heath
HK	2	Michael Foley
LP	1	Dan Crowley
Replacements:
WG	16	Joe Roff
CE	17	Richard Tombs
SH	18	Sam Payne
FL	19	Daniel Manu
PR	20	Richard Harry
HK	21	Marco Caputo
Coach:
Greg Smith

=== Round 6 ===
10 August 1996
17:00 SAST (UTC+02)

South Africa	18–29	New Zealand
Try: Du Randt; Mulder; Con: Stransky; Pen: Stransky (2)	Report	Try: Osborne; Dowd; Con: Mehrtens (2); Pen: Mehrtens (5)

Newlands Stadium, Cape Town
Attendance: 51,000
Referee: David McHugh (Ireland)

FB	15	James Small
RW	14	Pieter Hendriks
OC	13	Japie Mulder
IC	12	Hennie le Roux
LW	11	Justin Swart
FH	10	Joel Stransky
SH	9	Joost van der Westhuizen
N8	8	Gary Teichmann
OF	7	Ruben Kruger
BF	6	Francois Pienaar (c)
RL	5	Mark Andrews
LL	4	Steve Atherton
TP	3	Marius Hurter
HK	2	John Allan
LP	1	Os du Randt
Replacements:
CE	16	Danie van Schalkwyk
FH	17	Vlok Cilliers
SH	18	Joggie Viljoen
LK	19	Hannes Strydom
PR	20	Dawie Theron
HK	21	Henry Tromp
Coach:
Andre Markgraaff

FB	15	Christian Cullen
RW	14	Jeff Wilson
OC	13	Frank Bunce
IC	12	Walter Little
LW	11	Glen Osborne
FH	10	Andrew Mehrtens
SH	9	Justin Marshall
N8	8	Zinzan Brooke
OF	7	Josh Kronfeld
BF	6	Michael Jones
RL	5	Robin Brooke
LL	4	Ian Jones
TP	3	Olo Brown
HK	2	Sean Fitzpatrick (c)
LP	1	Craig Dowd
Replacements:
CE	16	Alama Ieremia
SH	17	Jon Preston
FL	18	Andrew Blowers
LK	19	Blair Larsen
PR	20	Bull Allen
HK	21	Norm Hewitt
Coach:
John Hart

== Bibliography ==
- Cleary, Mick; Griffiths, John, eds. (1997). Rothmans Rugby Union Yearbook 1997–98. London: Headline Book Publishing. ISBN 0-7472-7732-X.
- Howitt, Bob (2005). SANZAR Saga: Ten Years of Super 12 and Tri-Nations Rugby. Auckland: HarperCollins. ISBN 1-86950-566-2.
