= 1997 Tri Nations Series =

Final positions
- Champions: New Zealand (2nd title)
- Bledisloe Cup: New Zealand

Tournament statistics
- Matches played: 6
- Tries scored: 48 (8 per match)
- Attendance: 327,356 (54,559 per match)

The 1997 Tri Nations Series was the second Tri Nations Series, an international rugby union competition contested by the men's national teams from Australia, New Zealand and South Africa. It was played from 19 July to 23 August, with each team playing each of the others twice – once at home and once away. New Zealand won all four of their matches to claim a second straight title.

New Zealand also won the Bledisloe Cup, a title contested only between themselves and Australia, for the third year in a row. They led 1–0 going into the Tri Nations, having won the test between them in Christchurch two weeks before the start of the series, and the two victories in the Tri Nations gave them a 3–0 final result.

== Table ==
Place	Nation	Games				Points			Try bonus	Losing bonus	Table points
Place	Nation	Played	Won	Drawn	Lost	For	Against	Diff	Try bonus	Losing bonus	Table points
1	New Zealand	4	4	0	0	159	109	+50	2	0	18
2	South Africa	4	1	0	3	148	144	–4	2	1	7
3	Australia	4	1	0	3	96	150	–54	2	0	6

== Results ==
=== Round 1 ===
19 July 1997
15:00 SAST (UTC+02)

(1 BP) South Africa	32–35	New Zealand (1 BP)
Try: Bennett; Drotské; Con: De Beer (2); Pen: De Beer (4); Drop: De Beer (2)		Try: Bunce (2); Spencer; Wilson; Con: Spencer (3); Pen: Spencer (3)

Ellis Park Stadium, Johannesburg
Attendance: 51,000
Referee: Peter Marshall (Australia)

FB	15	Russell Bennett
RW	14	André Snyman
OC	13	Percy Montgomery
IC	12	Danie van Schalkwyk
LW	11	Pieter Rossouw
FH	10	Jannie de Beer
SH	9	Joost van der Westhuizen
N8	8	Gary Teichmann (c)
OF	7	André Venter
BF	6	Ruben Kruger
RL	5	Mark Andrews
LL	4	Krynauw Otto
TP	3	Marius Hurter
HK	2	Naka Drotské
LP	1	Os du Randt
Replacements:
FB	16	James Small
CE	17	Henry Honiball
SH	18	Werner Swanepoel
LK	19	Fritz van Heerden
PR	20	Dawie Theron
HK	21	Chris Rossouw
Coach:
(South Africa) Carel du Plessis

FB	15	Christian Cullen
RW	14	Jeff Wilson
OC	13	Frank Bunce
IC	12	Lee Stensness
LW	11	Tana Umaga
FH	10	Carlos Spencer
SH	9	Justin Marshall
N8	8	Zinzan Brooke
OF	7	Josh Kronfeld
BF	6	Taine Randell
RL	5	Robin Brooke
LL	4	Ian Jones
TP	3	Olo Brown
HK	2	Sean Fitzpatrick (c)
LP	1	Craig Dowd
Replacements:
CE	16	Alama Ieremia
FH	17	Andrew Mehrtens
SH	18	Ofisa Tonu'u
LK	19	Charles Riechelmann
PR	20	Bull Allen
HK	21	Norm Hewitt
Coach:
(New Zealand) John Hart

=== Round 2 ===
26 July 1997
20:00 AEST (UTC+10)

Australia	18–33	New Zealand
Try: Gregan; Little; Con: Burke; Pen: Burke (2)		Try: Bunce; Cullen; Wilson; Con: Spencer (3); Pen: Spencer (4)

Melbourne Cricket Ground, Melbourne
Attendance: 90,119
Referee: Ed Morrison (England)

FB	15	Matt Burke
RW	14	Ben Tune
OC	13	Jason Little
IC	12	James Holbeck
LW	11	Joe Roff
FH	10	Tim Horan
SH	9	George Gregan
N8	8	Michael Brial
OF	7	Brett Robinson
BF	6	Daniel Manu
RL	5	John Eales (c)
LL	4	Garrick Morgan
TP	3	Andrew Heath
HK	2	Michael Foley
LP	1	Richard Harry
Replacements:
FH	17	Stephen Larkham
SH	19	Sam Payne
N8	16	Troy Coker
FL	18	David Wilson
PR	20	Andrew Blades
HK	21	Marco Caputo
Coach:
(Australia) Greg Smith

FB	15	Christian Cullen
RW	14	Jeff Wilson
OC	13	Frank Bunce
IC	12	Alama Ieremia
LW	11	Glen Osborne
FH	10	Carlos Spencer
SH	9	Justin Marshall
N8	8	Zinzan Brooke
OF	7	Josh Kronfeld
BF	6	Taine Randell
RL	5	Robin Brooke
LL	4	Ian Jones
TP	3	Olo Brown
HK	2	Sean Fitzpatrick (c)
LP	1	Craig Dowd
Replacements:
FB	16	Adrian Cashmore
FH	17	Andrew Mehrtens
SH	18	Ofisa Tonu'u
LK	19	Charles Riechelmann
PR	20	Bull Allen
HK	21	Norm Hewitt
Coach:
(New Zealand) John Hart

==== Notes ====
- A virtually unknown Hugh Jackman sang the national anthem for Australia in this match.

=== Round 3 ===
2 August 1997
20:00 AEST (UTC+10)

(1 BP) Australia	32–20	South Africa
Try: Tune (2); Larkham; Manu; Con: Knox (3); Pen: Knox (2)		Try: Andrews; De Beer; Du Randt; Con: De Beer; Pen: De Beer

Lang Park, Brisbane
Attendance: 36,000
Referee: Colin Hawke (New Zealand)

FB	15	Stephen Larkham
RW	14	Ben Tune
OC	13	Jason Little
IC	12	James Holbeck
LW	11	Joe Roff
FH	10	David Knox
SH	9	George Gregan
N8	8	Daniel Manu
OF	7	David Wilson
BF	6	Matt Cockbain
RL	5	John Eales (c)
LL	4	Owen Finegan
TP	3	Andrew Heath
HK	2	Michael Foley
LP	1	Richard Harry
Replacements:
FH	16	Elton Flatley
SH	17	Sam Payne
N8	18	Troy Coker
FL	19	Brett Robinson
PR	20	Andrew Blades
HK	21	Marco Caputo
Coach:
(Australia) Greg Smith

FB	15	Russell Bennett
RW	14	André Snyman
OC	13	Percy Montgomery
IC	12	Danie van Schalkwyk
LW	11	Pieter Rossouw
FH	10	Jannie de Beer
SH	9	Joost van der Westhuizen
N8	8	Gary Teichmann (c)
OF	7	André Venter
BF	6	Ruben Kruger
RL	5	Mark Andrews
LL	4	Krynauw Otto
TP	3	Dawie Theron
HK	2	Naka Drotské
LP	1	Os du Randt
Replacements:
WG	16	James Small
FH	17	Henry Honiball
SH	18	Werner Swanepoel
LK	19	Fritz van Heerden
PR	20	Adrian Garvey
HK	21	James Dalton
Coach:
(South Africa) Carel du Plessis

=== Round 4 ===
9 August 1997
19:35 NZST (UTC+12)

(1 BP) New Zealand	55–35	South Africa (1 BP)
Try: Cullen (2); Ieremia; Marshall; Randell; Spencer; Umaga; Con: Spencer (4); Pen: Spencer (4)		Try: Kruger; Montgomery; Rossouw; Teichmann; Van der Westhuizen; Con: De Beer (3); Honiball (2)

Eden Park, Auckland
Attendance: 48,000
Referee: Derek Bevan (Wales)

FB	15	Christian Cullen
RW	14	Jeff Wilson
OC	13	Frank Bunce
IC	12	Alama Ieremia
LW	11	Tana Umaga
FH	10	Carlos Spencer
SH	9	Justin Marshall
N8	8	Zinzan Brooke
OF	7	Josh Kronfeld
BF	6	Taine Randell
RL	5	Robin Brooke
LL	4	Ian Jones
TP	3	Olo Brown
HK	2	Sean Fitzpatrick (c)
LP	1	Craig Dowd
Replacements:
CE	16	Scott McLeod
FH	17	Andrew Mehrtens
SH	18	Ofisa Tonu'u
LK	19	Charles Riechelmann
PR	20	Bull Allen
HK	21	Norm Hewitt
Coach:
(New Zealand) John Hart

FB	15	Russell Bennett
RW	14	James Small
OC	13	Percy Montgomery
IC	12	Henry Honiball
LW	11	André Snyman
FH	10	Jannie de Beer
SH	9	Joost van der Westhuizen
N8	8	Gary Teichmann (c)
OF	7	André Venter	Sent off (straight red)
BF	6	Ruben Kruger
RL	5	Mark Andrews
LL	4	Krynauw Otto
TP	3	Marius Hurter
HK	2	James Dalton
LP	1	Os du Randt
Replacements:
WG	16	Pieter Rossouw
CE	17	Joe Gillingham
SH	18	Werner Swanepoel
LK	19	Fritz van Heerden
PR	20	Dawie Theron
HK	21	Naka Drotské
Coach:
(South Africa) Carel du Plessis

=== Round 5 ===
16 August 1997
19:35 NZST (UTC+12)

New Zealand	36–24	Australia (1 BP)
Try: Cullen; Marshall; Randell; Con: Spencer (3); Pen: Spencer (5)		Try: Larkham (2); Roff; Tune; Con: Knox (2)

Carisbrook, Dunedin
Attendance: 42,500
Referee: Joël Dumé (France)

FB	15	Christian Cullen
RW	14	Jeff Wilson
OC	13	Frank Bunce
IC	12	Alama Ieremia
LW	11	Glen Osborne
FH	10	Carlos Spencer
SH	9	Justin Marshall
N8	8	Zinzan Brooke
OF	7	Josh Kronfeld
BF	6	Taine Randell
RL	5	Robin Brooke
LL	4	Ian Jones
TP	3	Olo Brown
HK	2	Sean Fitzpatrick (c)
LP	1	Craig Dowd
Replacements:
CE	16	Scott McLeod
FH	17	Andrew Mehrtens
SH	18	Ofisa Tonu'u
LK	19	Charles Riechelmann
PR	20	Bull Allen
HK	21	Anton Oliver
Coach:
(New Zealand) John Hart

FB	15	Stephen Larkham
RW	14	Ben Tune
OC	13	Jason Little
IC	12	James Holbeck
LW	11	Joe Roff
FH	10	David Knox
SH	9	George Gregan
N8	8	Troy Coker
OF	7	David Wilson (c)
BF	6	Fili Finau
RL	5	John Langford
LL	4	Owen Finegan
TP	3	Andrew Blades
HK	2	Michael Foley
LP	1	Richard Harry
Replacements:
WG	16	Mitch Hardy
SH	17	Sam Payne
N8	18	Toutai Kefu
FL	19	Brett Robinson
HK	20	Marco Caputo
PR	21	Andrew Heath
Coach:
(Australia) Greg Smith

=== Round 6 ===
23 August 1997
15:00 SAST (UTC+2)

(1 BP) South Africa	61–22	Australia
Try: Montgomery (2); Andrews; Brosnihan; Dalton; De Beer; Erasmus; Rossouw; Con: De Beer (6); Pen: De Beer (3)		Try: Knox; Little; Roff; Con: Knox (2); Pen: Knox

Loftus Versfeld Stadium, Pretoria
Attendance: 51,000
Referee: Paddy O'Brien (New Zealand)

FB	15	André Joubert
RW	14	James Small
OC	13	Percy Montgomery
IC	12	Henry Honiball
LW	11	André Snyman
FH	10	Jannie de Beer
SH	9	Joost van der Westhuizen
N8	8	Gary Teichmann (c)
OF	7	Rassie Erasmus
BF	6	Warren Brosnihan
RL	5	Mark Andrews
LL	4	Hannes Strydom
TP	3	Marius Hurter
HK	2	James Dalton
LP	1	Os du Randt
Replacements:
WG	16	Pieter Rossouw
SH	17	Werner Swanepoel
FL	18	Schutte Bekker
LK	19	Braam Els
PR	20	Dawie Theron
HK	21	Naka Drotské
Coach:
(South Africa) Carel du Plessis

FB	15	Stephen Larkham
RW	14	Ben Tune
OC	13	Jason Little
IC	12	James Holbeck	Booked
LW	11	Joe Roff
FH	10	David Knox
SH	9	George Gregan
N8	8	Troy Coker
OF	7	David Wilson (c)
BF	6	Matt Cockbain
RL	5	John Langford
LL	4	Owen Finegan
TP	3	Andrew Blades
HK	2	Michael Foley
LP	1	Richard Harry
Replacements:
WG	16	Mitch Hardy
SH	17	Sam Payne
N8	18	Toutai Kefu
FL	19	Brett Robinson
PR	20	Andrew Heath
HK	21	Marco Caputo
Coach:
(Australia) Greg Smith
