= 1996 New Zealand rugby union tour of South Africa =

- Coach: John Hart
- Tour captain: Sean Fitzpatrick
Summary
P	W	D	L
Total
8	6	1	1
Test match
4	3	0	1
Opponent
P	W	D	L
South Africa
4	3	0	1

Tour chronology
- ← 1992 2026 →

The 1996 New Zealand rugby union tour of South Africa was a historic tour in the history of New Zealand rugby. The All Blacks won the test series 2–1 and became known as "the Incomparables" for their feat of winning a series in South Africa for the first time.

== Background ==
The rivalry between New Zealand and South Africa had begun in 1921. This history included the controversial 1981 tour. The All Blacks had never beaten South Africa in a test series in South Africa. All Black sides of 1928, 1949, 1960, 1970 and 1976 had all failed to beat South Africa away from home. 1996 was the year professionalism was introduced into rugby union meaning the creation of the new Tri nations and Super 12. A full-scale tour between New Zealand and South Africa is scheduled for 2026 called Rugby's Greatest Rivalry.

== The Tour ==
New Zealand and South Africa played four test matches; the first was the final match of the 1996 Tri Nations Series. The next three was for the test series which the All Blacks won 2–1.

=== 1st Test ===
17 August 1996

South Africa	19–23	New Zealand
Try: D. van Schalkwyk; Con: Stransky; Pen: Stransky (4)		Try: Brooke; Cullen; Wilson; Con: Culhane; Pen: Culhane (2)

King's Park, Durban
Attendance: 52,000
Referee: D. Mene (France)

=== 2nd Test ===
24 August 1996

South Africa	26–33	New Zealand
Try: Kruger; Strydom van der Westhuizen; Con: Stransky; Pen: Stransky (3)		Try: Brooke; Wilson (2); Con: Culhane (3); Pen: Culhane (2); Preston (2); Drop: Brooke

Loftus Versfeld, Pretoria
Attendance: 51,000
Referee: D. Mene (France)

=== 3rd Test ===
31 August 1996

South Africa	32–22	New Zealand
Try: Joubert van der Westhuizen (2); Con: Honiball; Pen: Honiball (2); Joubert (3)		Try: Fitzpatrick; Little; Marshall; Con: Merthens (2); Pen: Merthens

Ellis Park, Johannesburg
Attendance: 63,000
Referee: W. D. Bevan (Wales)

== Matches ==
Scores and results list New Zealand's points tally first.

Opponent	For	Against	Date	Venue	Status
Boland Invitation XV	32	21	6 August 1996	Esselen Park, Worcester	Tour Match
South Africa	29	18	10 August 1996	Newlands, Cape Town	Tri Nations
Eastern Province	31	23	13 August 1996	Boet Erasmus Stadium, Port Elizabeth	Tour Match
South Africa	23	19	17 August 1996	King's Park, Durban	Test Match
Western Transvaal	31	0	20 August 1996	Olën Park, Potchefstroom	Tour Match
South Africa	33	26	24 August 1996	Loftus Versfeld, Pretoria	Test Match
Griqualand West	18	18	27 August 1996	Hoffe Park, Kimberley	Tour Match
South Africa	22	32	31 August 1996	Ellis Park, Johannesburg	Test Match

== The squad ==
1. Simon Culhane (Southland) 2. Jon Preston (Wellington) 3. Matthew Cooper (Waikato) 4. Jeff Wilson (Otago) 5. Zinzan Brooke (Auckland) 6. Scott McLeod (Waikato) 7. Ofisa Tonu'u (Auckland) 8. Andrew Mehrtens (Canterbury) 9. Andrew Blowers (Auckland) 10. Christian Cullen (Manawatu) 11. Sean Fitzpatrick (Auckland) 12. Alama Ieremia (Wellington) 13. Blair Larsen (North Harbour) 14. Walter Little (North Harbour) 15. Jonah Lomu (Counties Manukau) 16. Justin Marshall (Canterbury) 17. Glen Osborne (North Harbour) 18. Eric Rush (North Harbour) 19. Carlos Spencer (Auckland) 20. Mark "Bull" Allen (Taranaki) 21. Con Barrell (Canterbury) 22. Todd Blackadder (Canterbury) 23. Robin Brooke (Auckland) 24. Olo Brown (Auckland) 25. Frank Bunce (North Harbour) 26. Phil Coffin (King Country) 27. Chresten Davis (Manawatu) 28. Craig Dowd (Auckland) 29. Norm Hewitt (Southland) 30. Ian Jones (North Harbour) 31. Michael Jones (Auckland) 32. Josh Kronfeld (Otago) 33. John "Tabai" Matson (Canterbury) 34. Anton Oliver (Otago) 35. Taine Randell (Otago) 36. Glenn Taylor (Northland)

== See also ==
- History of rugby union matches between New Zealand and South Africa
