= Michael Jones (rugby union) =

NZ & Western Samoa international rugby union player

Michael Jones KNZM
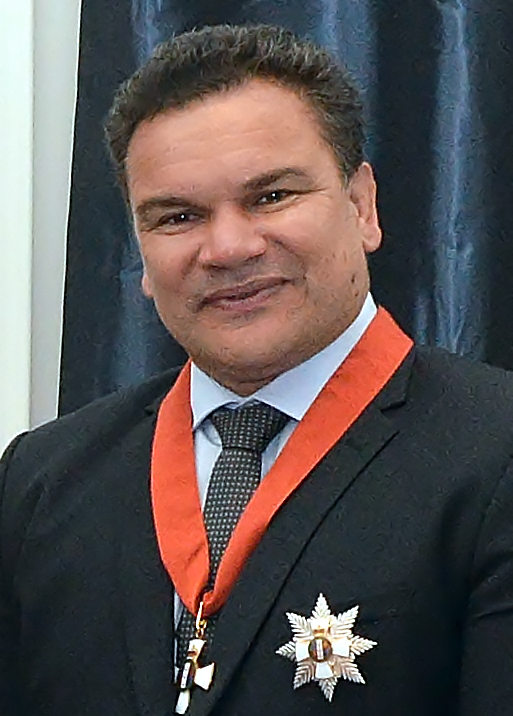
- Jones in 2017
- Born: Michael Niko Jones; 8 April 1965 (age 61) Auckland, New Zealand
- Height: 1.85 m (6 ft 1 in)
- Weight: 98 kg (216 lb)
- School: Henderson High School
- University: University of Auckland
- Notable relative: KJ Apa (nephew)
- Occupation(s): Rugby union footballer and coach

Rugby union career
- Position(s): Flanker; Number eight
Provincial / State sides
Years	Team	Apps	(Points)
1985–99	Auckland	96	(178)
Super Rugby
Years	Team	Apps	(Points)
1996–99	Blues	35	(35)
International career
Years	Team	Apps	(Points)
1986	Western Samoa	1	(0)
1987–98	New Zealand	55	(56)
Coaching career
- Years: Team
- 2004–07: Samoa

Sir Michael Niko Jones KNZM (born 8 April 1965) is a New Zealand former rugby union player and coach.

Jones was a member of the Auckland team which dominated New Zealand rugby in the late 1980s and 1990s, and the Blues team which won the first two Super 12 championships, in 1996 and 1997.

He played once for Western Samoa, and 55 times for New Zealand, including winning the first Rugby World Cup in 1987. He was known for his Christian beliefs, which meant he chose not to play on Sundays. He was named by Rugby World magazine as the third best All Black of the 20th century after Colin Meads and Sean Fitzpatrick. John Hart, who first selected him for Auckland, called him "almost the perfect rugby player".

After retiring as a player, he served as coach of Samoa from 2004 to 2007. He was knighted in 2017 for services to the Pacific community and youth.

== Early years ==
Jones was born in Auckland, New Zealand, and grew up in Te Atatū South, a suburb in the west of Auckland, attending Edmonton Primary, Rangeview Intermediate and Henderson High School. His talent for playing was discovered early, as a 10-year-old tackling 15 to 18 year-olds at the weekend kick-abouts at the primary school. He played for the primary school team when still in standard one, when he was three years younger than the other players and by the time he attended Henderson High School, he was already well known locally. He then helped turn a mediocre high school first XV into a successful rugby team that could compete with Auckland Grammar and Kelston Boys High (the regional heavyweights) for the first time. He played for the local Waitemata Rugby Club and it wasn't long before the Auckland representative team (coached by John Hart) took notice.

== Playing career ==
Jones played initially as an open side flanker, and made his provincial debut for Auckland aged 20 in the 1985 National Provincial Championship, scoring three tries against South Canterbury. He also played for New Zealand Colts. He made his international debut for Western Samoa, for whom he qualified through his mother, in 1986. After one cap for Samoa, and a British tour with the New Zealand Barbarians in 1987, he first played for New Zealand in the first game of the inaugural World Cup in the same year. He was the first player to score a try in the tournament and played in four games, including the final, as New Zealand went on to win the competition.

Jones's career was blighted by injuries, notably two serious knee injuries (in 1989 and 1997) and a broken jaw in 1993. Due to this he only played 55 international games during a period when New Zealand played almost 90 internationals, even though he was usually first choice whenever fit.

His international career was also affected by his strong Christian beliefs, as he refused to play on Sundays. Although he was selected for the 1987 and 1991 All Black World Cup squads, he missed three Sunday games in the 1991 tournament due to his religious beliefs. Jones was omitted from the 1995 squad as he would have been unavailable for the quarterfinal and semifinal games. He was once asked how a Christian such as himself could be such an uncompromising tackler. In reply he quoted a phrase from the Bible: it's better to give than to receive.

In the Rugby Almanack of New Zealand, he was selected as one of the "Five promising players" from the 1985 season and one of the "Five players of the year" for the 1988 and 1991 seasons.

Jones was a member of the successful Auckland and Auckland Blues teams which dominated New Zealand rugby in the late 1980s and 1990s. Between 1985 and 1999 Auckland won 9 NPC titles, 5 Super 6 championships, and defended the Ranfurly Shield a record 61 consecutive times (between 1985 and 1993), while the Blues won the first two Super 12 competitions in 1996 and 1997. In 1997 he succeeded Zinzan Brooke as captain of Auckland and the Blues. Due to his sporting successes, Jones was one of the most recognisable Samoan New Zealanders figures in the country in the 1980s.

He was an outstanding openside flanker, and scored 13 international tries. Later in his career, and after his injuries had reduced the speed which characterised his early career, he played predominantly as a blindside flanker or number eight. In 1998 he was dropped from the New Zealand team at the age of 33 after a loss over Australia and retired at the end of the 1999 season.

== Coaching career ==
On 7 April 2004 Jones was appointed national coach of Samoa, replacing New Zealander John Boe. He had previously served as Boe's assistant coach during the 2003 World Cup. In 2007, just after the players flew out to New Zealand to prepare for their tour of South Africa, there was speculation that Jones had resigned as coach. However, after talks with the Manu Samoa Union over whether his role should become full-time until the World Cup, Jones joined the team on tour.

== After rugby ==
Since 2002, he has been Village Trust food bank manager in Avondale, Auckland. Due to demands of the food bank, he declined invitations to be enlisted for Match Fit series in 2020 and 2021/22, but made an appearance in 2020.

== Personal life ==
Jones graduated from the University of Auckland with three degrees: a Bachelor of Arts, Master of Arts, and Bachelor of Planning.

Jones and his wife Maliena have three children.

== Awards and recognition ==
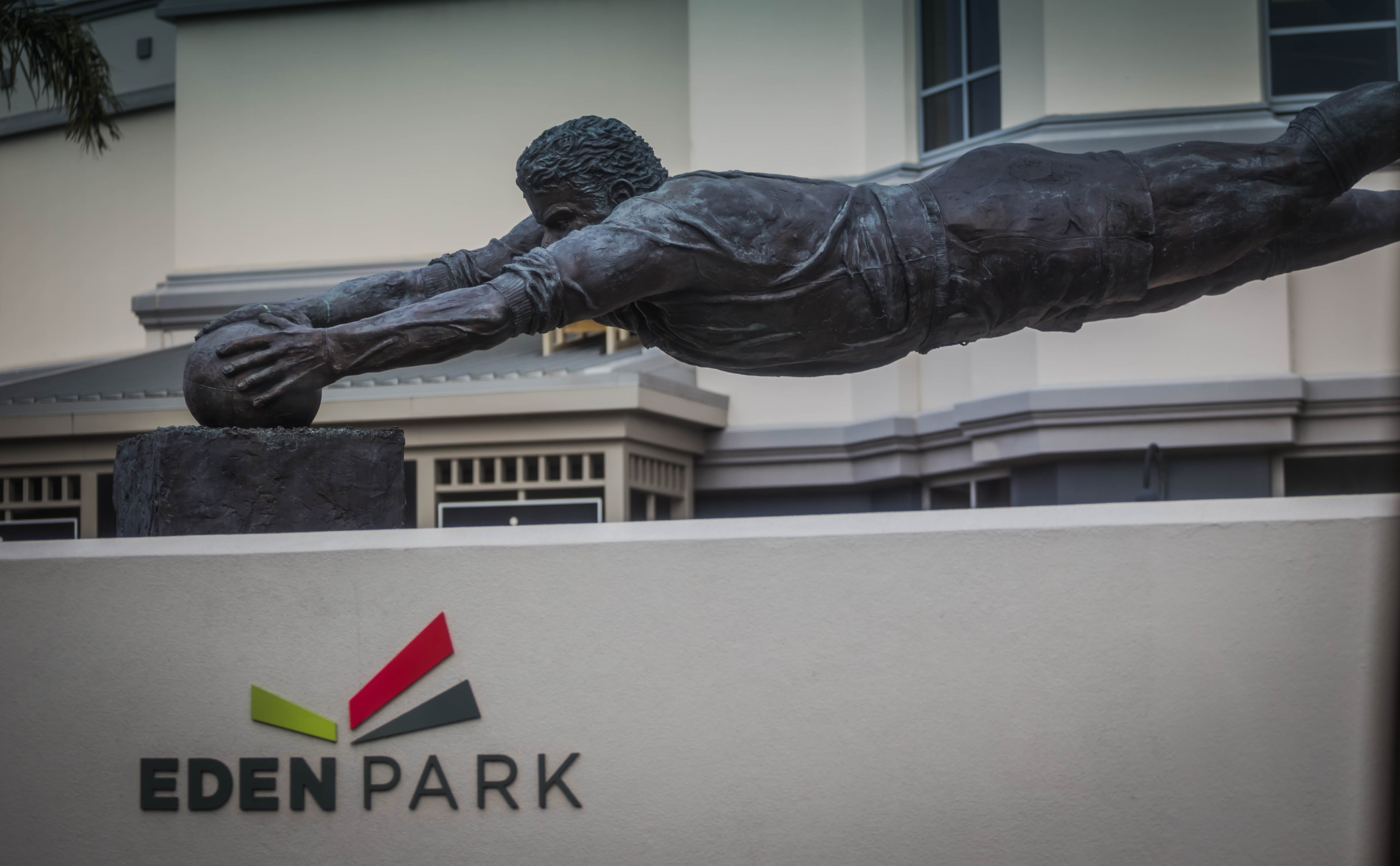
Statue of Michael Jones' try at the 1987 Rugby World Cup, at Eden Park in Auckland

Jones was awarded the New Zealand 1990 Commemoration Medal, for service to the Pacific Island community. In the 1997 New Year Honours, Jones was appointed a Member of the New Zealand Order of Merit (MNZM), for services to rugby. In 2003, he was inducted into the International Rugby Hall of Fame. He was promoted to Knight Companion of the New Zealand Order of Merit (KNZM) in the 2017 Queen's Birthday Honours, for services to the Pacific community and youth.

New Zealand sculptor Natalie Stamilla created a bronze statue of Jones, depicting his try at the 1987 Rugby World Cup. The statue was unveiled in 2011, and is located outside of Eden Park in Auckland.

Jones has been given the matai title (Samoan chiefly title) of La'auli and Savae from his ‘aiga (extended family).

In 2025, Jones was inducted into the Pasifika Rugby Hall of Fame.

For the 2011 Rugby World Cup, Jones was one of 15 legendary All Blacks who had a special edition camper van named after him https://commons.wikimedia.org/wiki/File:Jonesy2011.jpg

== Honours ==
=== Auckland ===
- National Provincial Championships: 1985, 1987, 1988, 1989, 1990, 1993, 1994, 1995, 1996, 1999
- Ranfurly Shield holder

=== Auckland Blues ===
- Super 12 champion: 1996, 1997

=== New Zealand ===
- Rugby World Cup winner: 1987
- Tri-Nations winner: 1996, 1997

Sporting positions
Preceded by (New Zealand) John Boe	Samoa National Rugby Union Coach; 2004–2007	Succeeded by (Samoa) Niko Palamo
