= Richard Graham (rugby union, born 1972) =

Australian rugby union player

- Born: Richard Graham; 5 August 1972 (age 54) Charleville, Queensland, Australia
- School: Marist College Ashgrove

Rugby union career
- Position: Coaching Coordinator
- Current team: Marist College Ashgrove
Senior career
Years	Team	Apps	(Points)
1991–1993	GPS		(67)
1994–2002	Easts		(213)
Provincial / State sides
Years	Team	Apps	(Points)
1998–2002	Reds	13	(25)
Super Rugby
Years	Team	Apps	(Points)
1998–2002	Reds	2	(0)
International career
Years	Team	Apps	(Points)
2001	Australia A	1	(0)
National sevens team
Years	Team		Comps
1998–2002	Australia		23
Coaching career
- Years: Team
- 2016–: Georgia
- 2013–16: Queensland Reds
- 2010–12: Western Force
- 2009–10: Wallabies
- 2006–09: Saracens RFC
- 2002–06: Bath RFC
Medal record
Men's rugby sevens
Representing Australia
Commonwealth Games
Bronze medal – third place	1998 Kuala Lumpur	Team competition

Richard Graham (born 5 August 1972) is a rugby union coach and former head coach of the Australian Super Rugby franchises, the Queensland Reds and Western Force.

== Early life ==
Richard Graham was born in central western Queensland (Charleville). He also lived in (Miles), (Mitchell), (Hughenden), (Longreach) and (Rockhampton).

He attended Marist College Ashgrove as a boarding student and was a talented schoolboy sportsman. Graham played 1st XI Cricket, captained 1st XV Rugby and captained the school athletics team. In his final year at school, Graham won the TAS 110m hurdles. Former Wallabies Daniel Herbert, Graeme Bond and Pat Howard were part of Graham's 1st XV in 1990. Graham played for the undefeated Australian Schoolboys Rugby Union team that toured Europe in 1990/91 with the likes of Matt Burke, Peter Jorgensen, Jacob Rauluni and Scott Bowen.

== Playing career ==
Richard Graham played a year of Colts rugby at the GPS Rugby Club and was awarded the Queensland Colt of the Year in 1991. The following year saw Graham suffer a badly broken leg and subsequently a number of seasons away from the game. In 1995 he changed clubs and began playing for the Easts RFC in Brisbane winning the 1997 Brisbane premiership and also the 1999 Brisbane premiership as captain. He made his debut for the Queensland Reds against Hong Kong in 1998 and in 2001 played for Australia A against the touring British and Irish Lions. It was as a Rugby 7s player however that Graham was best known. He played for and captained the Australian Rugby 7s team between 1998 and 2002, his teams won 5 IRB series events and he attended 2 Commonwealth Games – 1998 (Kuala Lumpur) and 2002 (Manchester). In 1998 the team won a bronze medal beating Samoa in the 3rd and 4th play off.

== Coaching career ==
Richard Graham began his professional coaching career with the Bath RFC in the English Premiership under former Wallaby hooker Michael Foley. In his 4 seasons with the club, he also worked under John Connolly (former Wallaby coach) and Brian Ashton (former England coach). Graham then moved to the Saracens RFC, where he worked under Alan Gaffney (former assistant Wallaby and Ireland coach) and Eddie Jones (former Wallaby coach) before finishing as head coach in 2009. In June 2009 Graham joined Robbie Deans as skills coach of the National team. While in this role he also accepted a position of assistant coach to former All Blacks coach John Mitchell at the Western Force. When Mitchell unexpectedly joined the Lions in Johannesburg in September 2010 Graham was promoted to head coach a year earlier than anticipated. On 16 April 2012 Graham was sacked as coach of the Western Force after he announced he would be joining the Reds to become head coach in 2013. After two games into the 2016 Super Rugby season Graham and the Queensland Reds parted ways. In June 2016 Richard Graham was appointed coaching coordinator for the Georgia Rugby Union national side.

== Education ==
Following his schooling at Marist College, Richard Graham completed a Bachelor of Education degree. He has also completed a Diploma of Financial Planning and a Graduate Certificate in Executive Leadership. He is currently completing a Master of Business Administration (MBA) through the University of Queensland.
