= Tri Nations Series champions =

Left: The Tri Nations logo from 1996–2011 with the South African logo on the left, New Zealand logo on the right, and the Australian logo on the bottom.
Right: The one-off 2020 Tri Nations banner, with the Argentine logo on the left, Australian logo in the middle, and the New Zealand logo on the right.

Tri Nations Series champion is the title given to the rugby union nation (either Australia, New Zealand, South Africa, or, since 2012, Argentina) that finishes at the top of competition table of the annual Tri Nations Series. The Bledisloe Cup, an Australian-New Zealand trophy is also awarded within the series.

Each nation plays each other thrice on a home and away basis, though the number of games against each side was expanded from two to three in 2006. A nation receives four points for a win, two for a draw and none for a loss. A nation can obtain a bonus point by either scoring four tries in a match or by losing by seven points or less to the opposition. If nations finish level on points (points for winning, drawing and bonus match points), the first tiebreaker is point differential (the actual in game scoreline, a cumulative scoreline difference). The scoreline difference is worked out by subtracting the number of points a nation has had scored against them from the total points they have scored in the series. Should teams still be level, this is followed by number of tries scored by a nation during the series.

The Tri Nations was created amongst the SANZAR partners (along with the provincial Super 12 competition, now, Super Rugby). The tournament involves three southern hemisphere nations; Australia, New Zealand and South Africa. The series was created to form a similar competition to the Six Nations Championship (then, the Five Nations). The first tournament was held in 1996, which New Zealand won. It has subsequently been held annually. The competition has largely been dominated by New Zealand, who have won 10 championships, whereas Australia and South Africa have each won the series three times. New Zealand has won consecutive championships on three occasions (1996–97, 2002–03, and 2005–08) and Australia on one occasion (2000–01).

== Results ==
=== Tournaments (1996–2011; 2020) ===
Year	Duration	Table position	Nation	Games				Points			Bonus points	Table points
Year	Duration	Table position	Nation	Played	Won	Drawn	Lost	For	Against	Difference	Bonus points	Table points
1996	6 July – 10 August	1	New Zealand	4	4	0	0	119	60	+59	1	17
1996	6 July – 10 August	2	South Africa	4	1	0	3	70	84	−14	2	6
1996	6 July – 10 August	3	Australia	4	1	0	3	71	116	−45	2	6
1997	19 July – 27 August	1	New Zealand	4	4	0	0	159	109	+50	2	17
1997	19 July – 27 August	2	South Africa	4	1	0	3	148	144	+4	3	7
1997	19 July – 27 August	3	Australia	4	1	0	3	96	150	−54	2	6
1998	11 July – 22 August	1	South Africa	4	4	0	0	80	54	+26	1	17
1998	11 July – 22 August	2	Australia	4	2	0	2	79	82	−3	2	10
1998	11 July – 22 August	3	New Zealand	4	0	0	4	65	88	−23	2	2
1999	10 July – 28 August	1	New Zealand	4	3	0	1	103	61	+42	0	12
1999	10 July – 28 August	2	Australia	4	2	0	2	84	57	+27	2	10
1999	10 July – 28 August	3	South Africa	4	1	0	3	34	103	−69	0	4
2000	15 July – 26 August	1	Australia	4	3	0	1	104	86	+18	2	14
2000	15 July – 26 August	2	New Zealand	4	2	0	2	127	117	+10	2	10
2000	15 July – 26 August	3	South Africa	4	1	0	3	82	110	−28	2	6
2001	21 July – 1 September	1	Australia	4	2	1	1	81	75	+6	1	11
2001	21 July – 1 September	2	New Zealand	4	2	0	2	79	70	+9	1	9
2001	21 July – 1 September	3	South Africa	4	1	1	2	52	67	−15	0	6
2002	13 July – 17 August	1	New Zealand	4	3	0	1	97	65	+32	3	15
2002	13 July – 17 August	2	Australia	4	2	0	2	91	86	+5	3	11
2002	13 July – 17 August	3	South Africa	4	1	0	3	103	140	−37	3	7
2003	12 July – 16 August	1	New Zealand	4	4	0	0	142	65	+77	2	18
2003	12 July – 16 August	2	Australia	4	1	0	3	89	106	−17	2	6
2003	12 July – 16 August	3	South Africa	4	1	0	3	62	122	−60	0	4
2004	17 July – 21 August	1	South Africa	4	2	0	2	110	98	+12	3	11
2004	17 July – 21 August	2	Australia	4	2	0	2	79	83	−4	2	10
2004	17 July – 21 August	3	New Zealand	4	2	0	2	83	91	−8	1	9
2005	30 July – 3 September	1	New Zealand	4	3	0	1	111	86	+25	3	15
2005	30 July – 3 September	2	South Africa	4	3	0	1	93	82	−11	1	13
2005	30 July – 3 September	3	Australia	4	0	0	4	72	108	−36	3	3
2006	8 July – 9 September	1	New Zealand	6	5	0	1	179	112	+67	3	23
2006	8 July – 9 September	2	Australia	6	2	0	4	133	121	+12	3	11
2006	8 July – 9 September	3	South Africa	6	2	0	4	106	185	−79	1	9
2007	16 June – 21 July	1	New Zealand	4	3	0	1	100	59	+41	1	13
2007	16 June – 21 July	2	Australia	4	2	0	2	76	80	-4	1	9
2007	16 June – 21 July	3	South Africa	4	1	0	3	66	103	-37	1	5
2008	5 July – 13 September	1	New Zealand	6	4	0	2	152	106	+46	3	19
2008	5 July – 13 September	2	Australia	6	3	0	3	119	163	-44	2	14
2008	5 July – 13 September	3	South Africa	6	2	0	4	115	117	-2	2	10
2009	18 July – 19 September	1	South Africa	6	5	0	1	158	130	+28	1	21
2009	18 July – 19 September	2	New Zealand	6	3	0	3	141	131	+10	1	13
2009	18 July – 19 September	3	Australia	6	1	0	5	103	141	-44	3	7
2010	10 July – 11 September	1	New Zealand	6	6	0	0	184	111	+73	3	27
2010	10 July – 11 September	2	Australia	6	2	0	4	162	188	-26	3	11
2010	10 July – 11 September	3	South Africa	6	1	0	5	147	194	-47	3	7
2011	23 July – 27 August	1	Australia	4	3	0	1	92	79	+13	1	13
2011	23 July – 27 August	2	New Zealand	4	2	0	2	95	64	+31	2	10
2011	23 July – 27 August	3	South Africa	4	1	0	3	54	98	-44	1	5
2020	31 October – 5 December	1	New Zealand	4	2	0	2	118	54	+64	3	11
2020	31 October – 5 December	2	Argentina	4	1	2	1	56	84	–28	0	8
2020	31 October – 5 December	3	Australia	4	1	2	1	60	96	–36	0	8

=== Aggregate table ===
Tri Nations Series (1996–2011; 2020)
Nation	Matches				Points			Bonus points	Table points	Titles won
Nation	P	W	D	L	PF	PA	PD	Bonus points	Table points	Titles won
New Zealand	76	52	0	24	2,054	1,449	+605	35	243	11
Australia	76	30	3	43	1,591	1,817	−226	34	160	3
South Africa	72	28	1	43	1,480	1,831	−351	24	138	3
Argentina	4	1	2	1	56	84	–28	0	8	0

Source: lassen.co.nz – Tri-Nations, Australia, New Zealand, South Africa

Bonus points given by T – 4W − 2D, for T table points, W games won and D games drawn.

Rugby Championship (since 2012)
Nation	Matches				Points			Bonus points	Table points	Titles won
Nation	P	W	D	L	PF	PA	PD	Bonus points	Table points	Titles won
New Zealand	69	55	2	12	2,313	1,348	+965	43	268	9
South Africa	69	37	4	28	1,845	1,534	+311	33	185	3
Australia	69	28	3	38	1,563	1,900	−337	16	141	1
Argentina	69	14	1	54	1,358	2,277	−919	16	66	0

Updated: 4 October 2025
Source: lassen.co.nz – TRC, Argentina, Australia, New Zealand, South Africa
Bonus points given by T – 4W − 2D, for T table points, W games won and D games drawn.

All-time Tri Nations Series and Rugby Championship Table (since 1996)
Nation	Matches				Points			Bonus points	Table points	Titles won
Nation	P	W	D	L	PF	PA	PD	Bonus points	Table points	Titles won
New Zealand	145	107	2	36	4,367	2,797	+1,570	78	511	20
South Africa	141	65	5	71	3,325	3,365	–40	57	323	6
Australia	145	58	6	81	3,154	3,717	–563	50	301	4
Argentina	73	15	3	55	1,414	2,361	–947	16	74	0

Updated: 4 October 2025
Bonus points given by T – 4W − 2D, for T table points, W games won and D games drawn.
