= Nasi Manu =

Tonga international rugby union player (born 1988)

- Full name: Tavake Lecanus Liukanasi Manu
- Born: 15 August 1988 (age 38) Lincoln, New Zealand
- Height: 1.90 m (6 ft 3 in)
- Weight: 118 kg (18 st 8 lb; 260 lb)
- School: Christchurch Boys' High School
- Notable relative(s): Daniel Manu (uncle); Sika Manu (cousin)

Rugby union career
- Position(s): Flanker, Number 8
- Current team: Mid Canterbury
Senior career
Years	Team	Apps	(Points)
2007–2014	Canterbury	72	(65)
2008–2009	Crusaders	16	(5)
2010–2015	Highlanders	65	(5)
2015–2017	Edinburgh	16	(25)
2017–2020	Benetton Treviso	14	(0)
2020−2022	Otago		
- Correct as of 22 May 2018
International career
Years	Team	Apps	(Points)
2008	New Zealand U20	4	(5)
2018–2022	Tonga	6	(0)
- Correct as of 13 Oct 2019

Tavake Lecanus Liukanasi Manu (born 15 August 1988) is a retired New Zealand rugby union player. He played in the number 8 and occasionally flanker position for Mitre 10 Cup side, Otago. Manu also represented Tonga at international level.

== Playing career ==
=== School boy rugby ===
While at Christchurch Boys' High School, Manu appeared alongside All Blacks Matt Todd, Colin Slade and Owen Franks as well as former Crusader Tim Bateman.

=== Provincial Rugby ===
Manu made his debut for Canterbury in the 2007 Air New Zealand Cup scoring a try on his debut against Counties Manukau at Mt. Smart Stadium in Auckland.

After missing the start of the 2010 ITM Cup with a knee injury, Manu was in excellent form through the latter part of the season, culminating in strong performances in the semi-final and final as Canterbury won the ITM Cup.

In the 2011 ITM Cup, Manu started every match as Canterbury won the title for the fourth consecutive season. From 2020 Mitre 10 Cup season, he was named for Otago squad.

=== Super Rugby ===
Manu earned a Crusaders contract for the 2008 Super 14 season at the age of just 19, and emerged as a regular performer for the club, making 12 appearances and two starts as the Crusaders rampaged to the Super 14 title.

In 2009, however, Manu was unable to build on the success of his freshman campaign, and was limited to only four appearances and one start.

Looking for more playing time, Manu shifted to the Highlanders for the 2010 Super 14 season. However, his season ended up being a total write-off as, after winning the starting job at number 8 in the preseason, he suffered a knee injury early in the season-opening contest against the Crusaders and was ruled out for the remainder of the competition.

In 2011, Manu managed to stay healthy and put in an excellent campaign, starting every match at number eight for the Highlanders.

Manu suffered a foot injury in the opening game of the 2013 Super Rugby season and was ruled out for the rest of the year. Healthy again for 2014, he was named co-captain of the Highlanders alongside Ben Smith.

=== European Rugby ===
After the experience with Edinburgh Rugby, from 2017 to 2020 he played with Benetton.

=== International Play ===
Manu was a member of New Zealand's squad on their run to the world under-19 title in 2007 and under-20 title in 2008. He also was part of the New Zealand Secondary Schools in 2005 and 2006.

=== Post-playing Career ===
Since retiring in 2022, Manu has taken up a position as the Environment Welfare Manager at the Highlanders.

== Personal ==
Manu is the nephew of the former Auckland and Wallaby loose forward Daniel Manu and is the cousin of David Manu and Sika Manu of the Melbourne Storm. His younger brother Vaka Manu had a 1-year stint with rugby in Scotland playing for the Stirling County Rugby Club in 2015–16. And second youngest brother Taniela Manu currently plays in the Mitre 10 cup for Northland.

== Achievements ==
2007 Canterbury Junior Sports Person of the Year, Hadlee Awards

- Canterbury

•Air New Zealand/ITM Cup: 2008, 2009, 2010, 2011, 2012, 2013

- Crusaders

•Super Rugby: 2008

- Highlanders

•Super Rugby: 2015
