= Os du Randt =

South African rugby union player

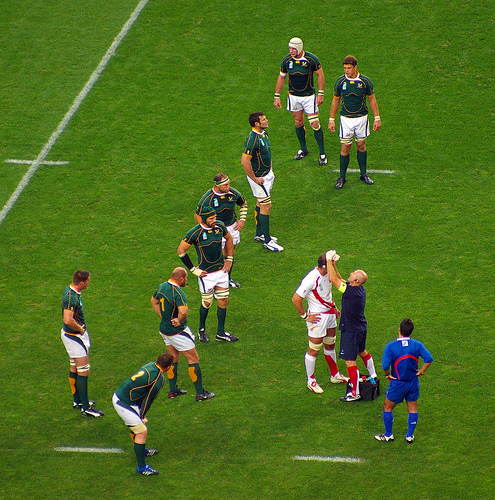
- South Africa vs. England during the 2007 RWC (du Randt in center)
- Born: Jacobus Petrus du Randt; 8 September 1972 (age 54) Elliot, Eastern Cape, South Africa
- Height: 1.90 m (6 ft 3 in)
- Weight: 135 kg (298 lb; 21.3 st)
- School: Adelaide Gymnasium
- Occupation: Farmer

Rugby union career
- Position: Loosehead prop
Provincial / State sides
Years	Team	Apps	(Points)
1996–1997	Cheetahs		
1999	Cheetahs		
2000	Blue Bulls		
2002–2007	Cheetahs		
Super Rugby
Years	Team	Apps	(Points)
1997	Cheetahs		
1998	Cats		
2000	Bulls		
2004–2005	Cats		
2006–2007	Cheetahs		
International career
Years	Team	Apps	(Points)
1994–2007	South Africa	80	(25)

Jacobus Petrus "Os" du Randt (born 8 September 1972) is a South African former rugby union player. A loosehead prop, he retired as the most-capped forward in the history of the South Africa national team, and won two Rugby World Cups, in 1995 and 2007. He ended his career as one of the last remaining international players from the amateur era of the sport and the last active member of the 1995 World Cup-winning squad. His final match was the 2007 Rugby World Cup final, which the Springboks won, with Du Randt playing the entire 80 minutes. He is one of 43 players who have won the Rugby World Cup on multiple occasions.

For most of his career, he played in the Currie Cup for the Free State Cheetahs, though he spent one season with the Blue Bulls. In Super Rugby, he represented the Free State Cheetahs, the Cats, the Bulls and the Cheetahs.

Du Randt is nicknamed Os, meaning "ox" in Afrikaans, due to his large size and powerful scrummaging.

== Early career ==
Born 8 September 1972 in Elliot, South Africa, Du Randt made his first appearance for the Springboks in October 1994 against Argentina in a 42–22 victory, and he was a member of the 1995 World Cup squad, playing at loosehead prop in the final against New Zealand when South Africa won 15–12. Du Randt continued to be a key member of the Boks in the following years, and was named by Rugby World magazine as the second-best loosehead of all time in 1999. However, in 2000, at the age of 27, Du Randt suffered injuries that kept him out of rugby for nearly three years.

== Comeback ==
In 2003, Du Randt received a phone call from former Springboks flanker and teammate Rassie Erasmus, who was coaching the Free State Cheetahs provincial team. The invitation did the trick, and Du Randt agreed to give it another shot.

Then in 2004, after an age-defying return to form in domestic play, du Randt was recalled to the Boks by new coach Jake White. He proved to be a key player in the Boks' 2004 revival, which saw them win the Tri Nations and be named as the IRB World Team of the Year.

"When I returned to rugby in 2003, it was to play for Free State and Free State alone," he recalled. "I didn't think I would wear the Springbok shirt again, ever in my life. When Jake White, the national coach, gave me the opportunity to play for my country once more, it felt like the first time all over again. I took some criticism in the media. There was a lot of stuff going around – most of it about me being too old.

In 2004, he received his 50th cap for the Springboks in a 32–16 loss to England at Twickenham. It was however, not to be a day to remember for him as, "du Randt was dismantled in the scrum, lock, stock and barrel, by England's Julian White". Droning chants of "Os...Os" have become commonplace at South African match venues since the big man made his return to Bok rugby.

And despite calls that he was getting too old, White persisted in selecting du Randt for the 2007 Rugby World Cup in France.

== Later career ==
Following victories in pool play over England, Manu Samoa, and Tonga and a quarter-final win over Fiji and semi-final victory against Argentina, du Randt and his South African teammates found themselves in a rematch against defending champions England in the final. The favoured Springboks dethroned England 15–6 in a hard-fought final, with Os playing all 80 minutes which included one bullocking run in the first half.

Du Randt was the last active member of the South African 1995 Rugby World Cup-winning squad and retired as South Africa's third most-capped player ever and most-capped forward. He missed the 2003 tournament through injury, but he came back to help lead the Springboks to the 2007 Rugby World Cup.

When interviewed, du Randt said "I would have to say that I never thought I would bow out in a World Cup final, when I called it a day in 2000. To begin with a world title and to finish with another would be a real accomplishment, a memory that I will cherish for ever. I dedicate this to my best friend, Alex."

When questioned about his teammate, fellow Springbok prop CJ van der Linde said "Os is a legend in South African rugby. Even little children know who he is. His name will be mentioned for many years still," Van der Linde said. "We do not realise what impact he makes. One day, when he is old, we will know what great work he did for South Africa and what a leader he was."

Following the victory in the 2007 Rugby World Cup final, Os announced his international retirement from the Springboks.

Du Randt returned to the sport for the 2009 Currie Cup season as a scrum coach for the Free State Cheetahs. In 2010, he took on the same position with the Springboks.

== International statistics ==
=== Test match record ===
Against	P	W	D	L	Tri	Pts	% won
Argentina	5	5	0	0	0	0	100
Australia	15	7	0	8	1	5	46.67
British Lions	3	1	0	2	1	5	33.33
England	5	4	0	1	0	0	80
Fiji	2	2	0	0	0	0	100
France	6	3	1	2	0	0	58.33
Ireland	3	2	0	1	0	0	66.67
Italy	1	1	0	0	1	5	100
Namibia	1	1	0	0	1	5	100
New Zealand	18	5	0	13	1	5	27.78
Pacific Islanders	1	1	0	0	0	0	100
Samoa	4	4	0	0	0	0	100
Scotland	7	7	0	0	0	0	100
Spain	1	1	0	0	0	0	100
Tonga	1	1	0	0	0	0	100
United States	2	2	0	0	0	0	100
Uruguay	2	2	0	0	0	0	100
Wales	4	4	0	0	0	0	100
Total	80	52	1	27	5	25	65.63

=== Test tries (5) ===
Tries	Opposition	Location	Venue	Competition	Date	Result
1	New Zealand	Cape Town, South Africa	Newlands	1996 Tri Nations	10 August 1996	Lost 18–29
1	British & Irish Lions	Cape Town, South Africa	Newlands	Test match	21 June 1997	Lost 16–25
1	Australia	Brisbane, Australia	Suncorp Stadium	1997 Tri Nations	2 August 1997	Lost 20–32
1	Italy	Bologna, Italy	Dall'Ara Stadium	Test match	8 November 1997	Won 61–31
1	Namibia	Cape Town, South Africa	Newlands	Test match	15 August 2007	Won 105–13

=== World Cup matches ===
Champions Runners-up Third place Fourth place

No.	Date	Opposition	Venue	Stage	Position	Tries	Result
1995
1.	25 May 1995	Australia	Newlands, Cape Town	Pool match	Loosehead prop		27–18
2.	10 Jun 1995	Samoa	Ellis Park, Johannesburg	Quarter-final	Loosehead prop		42–14
3.	17 Jun 1995	France	Kings Park, Durban	Semi-final	Loosehead prop		19–15
4.	24 Jun 1995	New Zealand	Ellis Park, Johannesburg	Final	Loosehead prop		15–12
1999
5.	3 Oct 1999	Scotland	Murrayfield, Edinburgh	Pool match	Loosehead prop		46–29
6.	10 Oct 1999	Spain	Murrayfield, Edinburgh	Pool match	Substitute		47–3
7.	15 Oct 1999	Uruguay	Hampden Park, Glasgow	Pool match	Loosehead prop		39–3
8.	24 Oct 1999	England	Stade de France, Paris	Quarter-final	Loosehead prop		44–21
9.	30 Oct 1999	Australia	Twickenham, London	Semi-final	Loosehead prop		21–27
10.	4 Nov 1999	New Zealand	Millennium Stadium, Cardiff	Third place play-off	Loosehead prop		22–18
2007
11.	9 Sep 2007	Samoa	Parc des Princes, Paris	Pool match	Loosehead prop		59–7
12.	14 Sep 2007	England	Stade de France, Paris	Pool match	Loosehead prop		36–0
13.	30 Sep 2007	United States	Stade de la Mosson, Montpellier	Pool match	Loosehead prop		64–15
14.	7 Oct 2007	Fiji	Stade Vélodrome, Marseille	Quarter-final	Loosehead prop		37–20
15.	14 Oct 2007	Argentina	Stade de France, Paris	Semi-final	Loosehead prop		37–13
16.	20 Oct 2007	England	Stade de France, Paris	Final	Loosehead prop		15–6

== Honours ==
- In 2019, World Rugby inducted Du Randt to its Hall of Fame, alongside Richie McCaw, Shiggy Konno, Peter Fatialofa, Graham Henry, and Diego Ormaechea.

== See also ==
- List of South Africa national rugby union players – Springbok no. 619
