= Waitemata Rugby Football and Sports Club =

Rugby club in Waitakere City, Auckland

Coordinates: 36.871675392°S 174.619149758°E

(New Zealand) Waitemata Rugby Football and Sports Club
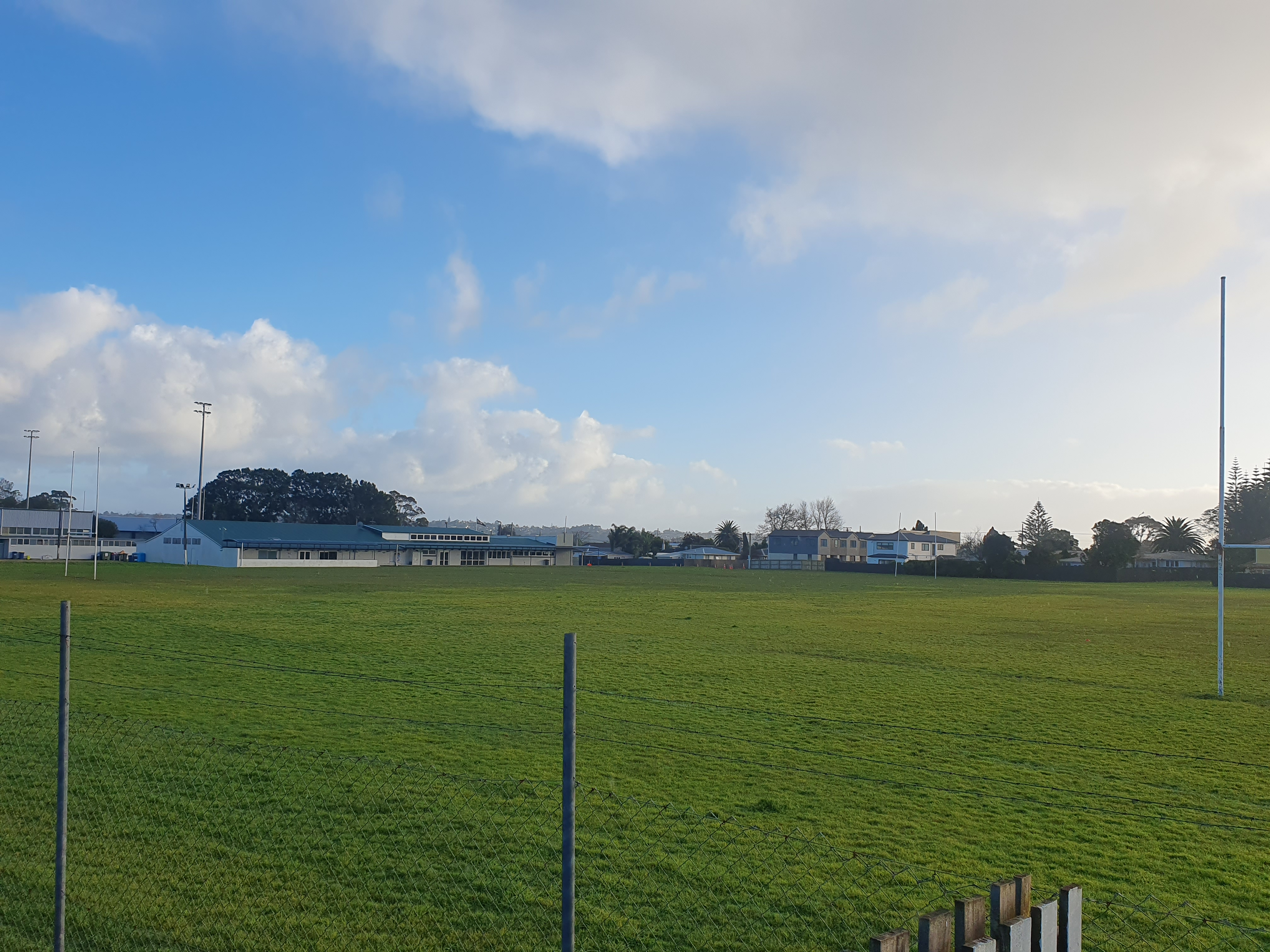
- Union: Auckland Rugby Football Union
- Founded: 1927
- Location: Henderson, Auckland
- Ground: Waitemata Park
- President: Brian Nola
- League: Auckland Premier

Official website
- www.waitematarugby.co.nz

Waitemata Rugby Football and Sports Club is a rugby union club based in Waitakere City, Auckland. The club is affiliated with the Auckland Rugby Football Union. Waitemata was founded in 1927 after an amalgamation of the Hobsonville, Waimauku and Swanson clubs. The club was based at Smythe Park until 1951, when the club moved to the present day grounds at Waitemata Park in Henderson. Waitemata has won the Gallaher Shield on four occasions, with the most recent success coming in 2003.

== Honours ==
- Gallaher Shield (4):

1958, 1962, 1975, 2003

- Jubilee Trophy:

2019

- Portola Trophy:

2021

== All Blacks ==
Waitemata has produced four All Blacks - Adrian Clarke, Kenneth Carrington, Michael Jones and Sione Lauaki. Former Auckland and All Blacks coach John Hart also played for and coached Waitemata. Waitemata also produced former Samoa wing and NRL player Misi Taulapapa.
