= Alama Ieremia =

NZ & Samoa international rugby union player

- Full name: Namulauulu Alama Ieremia
- Born: 27 October 1970 (age 56) Apia, Samoa
- Height: 186 cm (6 ft 1 in)
- Weight: 100 kg (220 lb; 15 st 10 lb)
- School: Samoa College

Rugby union career
- Position: Centre
- Current team: Auckland
Senior career
Years	Team	Apps	(Points)
1992–2000	Wellington	65	(70)
1996–2000	Hurricanes	42	(30)
2001–2004	Suntory Sungoliath	24	
- Correct as of 14 June 2023
International career
Years	Team	Apps	(Points)
1992–1993	Samoa	5	(0)
1994–2000	New Zealand	40	(45)
1994–1995	New Zealand XV	2	(0)
1996	New Zealand Barbarians	2	(0)
- Correct as of 22 April 2019
National sevens teams
Years	Team		Comps
1993	Samoa		1
1997	New Zealand		1
- Correct as of 22 April 2019
Coaching career
- Years: Team
- 2005–2007: Suntory Sungoliath (assistant)
- 2007: Wellington (assistant)
- 2009–2014: Hurricanes (assistant)
- 2014–2015: Samoa (assistant)
- 2015–2017: Samoa
- 2018–2022: Auckland
- 2023-: United States (assistant)
- 2024-: Anthem RC
- Correct as of 14 June 2023

Namulauulu Alama Ieremia (born 27 October 1970) is a New Zealand rugby union coach and former international player for Western Samoa and New Zealand.

== Early life ==
Ieremia was born in Sinamoga, a suburb of Apia, Samoa. He spent 6 years of his childhood in Christchurch, New Zealand, while his father attained a Bachelor of Arts in Divinity. During his time in Christchurch he attended Addington Primary School. His father completed his degree and Ieremia returned to Samoa, continuing his education at Samoa College. He returned to New Zealand in 1991 to study geography at Victoria University, where he began playing rugby.

== Playing career ==
Ieremia played provincial rugby with Wellington between 1992 and 2000, which included a National Provincial Championship title in his final season with the club. He played Super Rugby with the Hurricanes from its inaugural season in 1996, with Alama having the distinction of scoring the first ever try in Super rugby, against Auckland Blues in Palmerston North - Auckland Blues went on to win the match 36–28. The Hurricanes finished 9th at the end of the season. Alama's best season came in 1997, when the Hurricanes made it to the Semi finals haven finished third at the end of the Regular season. However the Hurricanes went down to the ACT Brumbies 33–20 in Canberra. Ieremia was a regular selection for the Hurricanes, forming a reliable and formidable midfield partnership with Jason O'Halloran.

In 2001, Ieremia moved to Japan to play for Suntory Sungoliath, which included a season as captain, before returning to New Zealand in 2004 after retiring from playing rugby.

=== International career ===
Ieremia began playing international rugby in 1992 for the national side Western Samoa. He made his debut on 13 June at Apia Park against Tonga, with Western Samoa winning 22–17. He earned 5 caps for Western Samoa, his last coming against the All Blacks at Eden Park on 31 July 1993, New Zealand winning 35–13, with the match being the first official international between the two countries.

With the lack of eligibility regulations in rugby before the professional era, Ieremia haven proven himself at Super Rugby level, was selected for the All Blacks in 1994. Ieremia's promotion to the All Blacks was rapid, due to the shock 2–0 series loss to France in June 1994. He was subsequently introduced for the three tests against the Springboks, playing at second five eighth with Frank Bunce, another who had been blooded by Samoa at test level, outside him at centre.

Ieremia was named in the All Blacks squad for the 1995 Rugby World Cup, but played only the pool match against Japan, where he also scored his first ever international try. For most of 1995 and 1996 the All Blacks' preference was for Walter Little as Bunce's partner and it was only an injury to Little that gave Ieremia his first extensive run as a regular test selection in 1997. An injury sustained during the 1998 Super 12 ruled him out of All Black selection that year, but he returned in 1999, and for the first part of the international season, he was used mainly at centre but for the bulk of the 1999 Rugby World Cup later in the year he was back at second five.

In 2000, he was again an All Black first choice, primarily as a centre.

When he left New Zealand rugby at the end of the 2000 season to take up an overseas contract, Ieremia had played 40 matches for the All Blacks, including 30 tests.

Ieremia also represented Western Samoa at the 1993 Rugby World Cup Sevens and New Zealand at the 1997 Rugby World Cup Sevens.

==== Honors ====
New Zealand

- Rugby World Cup / Webb Ellis Cup
  - Runners-up: 1995
- Bledisloe Cup
  - Winners: 1997
- Tri Nations
  - Winners: 1996, 1997, 1999
  - Runners-up: 2000

Western Samoa

- South Pacific Championship
  - Winners: 1992, 1993

Wellington

- National Provincial Championship
  - Winners: 2000

== Coaching career ==
After retiring from playing rugby in 2004, Ieremia took up a coaching role with Suntory Sungoliath, specializing as backs and attack coach. After two seasons in Japan, which saw Suntory make it to the final for the first time in over five years, Ieremia returned to New Zealand in 2007 as an assistant coach with the Wellington Lions. He helped guide Wellington to their second consecutive final, only to lose to Auckland 23–14. He was later named as the WRFU Academy head coach, a position he held for a year.

On 25 September 2008, Alama Ieremia was appointed to the Hurricanes coaching team for the 2009 and 2010 Super 14 season. Ieremia earned the accolade of becoming the first former player to become part of the coaching staff of the team. In his first season as attack coach, he helped the Hurricanes to third in the regular season, before losing to the Chiefs in the semi-final 14–10. Despite this, the Hurricanes had scored more points than any other team of 380, their nearest rivals being the Blues with 339. The following year, saw the Hurricanes drop to eighth on the table, failing to make the play-off for the first time since 2007. When Colin Cooper left the side in 2010, Mark Hammett retained Ieremia as the attack coach for the 2011 and 2012 Super Rugby season. In 2012, he was praised in the media for bring through young All Blacks talent, and therefore was retained for a further 2 seasons. When Hammett left the club in 2014, Ieremia went with him, joining the Samoan national team as attack coach. His first game was a 33–14 loss to Japan. In February 2015, he was appointed interim general manager of Samoan rugby's high performance unit.

=== Head coach of Samoa ===
On 23 December 2015, he was named head coach of the Manu Samoa, taking over from Stephen Betham, who resigned after the 2015 Rugby World Cup.

In his first match in charge, he led Samoa to a 19–all draw against Georgia, in which saw 9 players making their debut. A week later they went down to Fiji 26–16, before finishing their June internationals with a 30–10 victory over Tonga seeing Samoa finish second in the 2016 World Rugby Pacific Nations Cup. During the 2016 end-of-year internationals, Ieremia led Samoa to a single victory, beating Canada 25–23. The other tests saw Samoa lose to France 52–8 and Georgia 20–16.

In the 2017 mid-year internationals, Samoa lost all four games. This included a 78–0 loss to New Zealand, which was the first time since 1996 that Samoa had failed to score any points in a test match. The following week saw Wales defeat Manu Samoa in Apia for the first time since 1986, losing 19–17. The 2017 World Rugby Pacific Nations Cup saw Samoa finish in last place for the first ever time, this came following a first loss to Samoa since 2011, 30–26, and a historic win for Fiji in Apia 38–16. It was the first time since 2002 that Fiji had won in Samoa, and set a new winning margin in Samoa of 22 points.

Following a review following Samoa's June/July campaign, Ieremia resigned as Samoan head coach on 5 August. He left the post with a 20% win rate, just 2 wins from 10 matches.

=== Auckland coach ===
In December 2017 he was appointed head coach for the Auckland Rugby Union.

=== Honors ===
Samoa (as assistant coach)

- IRB Pacific Nations Cup
  - Winners: 2014 (joint with Japan)
  - Runners-up: 2015

Wellington (as assistant coach)

- National Provincial Championship
  - Runners-up: 2007

Sporting positions
Preceded by (Samoa) Stephen Betham	Samoan national rugby coach 2015–2017	Succeeded by (Samoa) Titimaea Tafua
