= Steve Atherton =

South Africa international rugby union footballer

- Born: Stephen Atherton; 17 March 1965 (age 61) Gosport, Hampshire, England
- Height: 2 m (6 ft 7 in)
- Weight: 117 kg (18 st 6 lb)
- School: Pinetown Boys' High School

Rugby union career
Provincial / State sides
Years	Team	Apps	(Points)
1988–2000	Natal	165	
Super Rugby
Years	Team	Apps	(Points)
1998–2000	Sharks		
International career
Years	Team	Apps	(Points)
1992–1996	South Africa	8	

Stephen Atherton (born 17 March 1965) is a South African former rugby union player who played as a lock or flanker.

== Playing career ==
Atherton represented the Natal Schools team, together with players such as Gary Teichmann and Joel Stransky, at the annual Craven Week in 1984 held in Bloemfontein. He made his debut for the Natal senior side in 1988 and played 165 matches for Natal over a thirteen-year period and was a member of the Currie Cup winning teams in 1990, 1992 and 1996.

Atherton toured with the Springboks to France and England in 1992, but did not play in any test matches. He made his test debut for South Africa during the 1993 tour of Argentina, in first test on 5 November 1993 at the Ferrocarril Oeste Stadium in Buenos Aires. He played in eight tests matches and fifteen tour matches for the Springboks, scoring one try in a tour match.
