= Michael Brial =

Australian former rugby union player

- Born: Michael Cameron Brial; 11 May 1970 (age 56) Narrabri, New South Wales, Australia
- Height: 6 ft 4 in (193 cm)
- Weight: 230 lb (104 kg)
- School: Narrabri High School

Rugby union career
- Position: Number 8
Youth career
- 1984-1986: Narrabri Blue Boars
- 1986-1992: Narrabri High School
Amateur team(s)
Years	Team	Apps	(Points)
1986-1992	Eastern Suburbs		
Provincial / State sides
Years	Team	Apps	(Points)
1986-1992	Central North		
1992-1995	New South Wales	66	(64)
Super Rugby
Years	Team	Apps	(Points)
1996-2000	NSW Waratahs		
International career
Years	Team	Apps	(Points)
1987	Australia U17		
1990	Australia U21		
1993-1997	Australia	13	(5)
National sevens team
Years	Team		Comps
1997	Australia 7s		

Michael Cameron Brial (born 11 May 1970, in Narrabri, New South Wales) is an Australian former rugby union player. He played as back-row, usually as number 8.

== Career ==
=== Club career ===
Brial grew up playing rugby league in his high school days. He first played rugby union at the age of 14, joining the Narrabri Blue Boars, where his brother Brenden played. Two years later, he joined the Narrabri High School team, with which he won the under-19 Wiburd Shield. He also represented Central North in the U-14, U-16 and U-19 teams. In 1992, Brial made his debut for New South Wales during the match against Wellington at the Athletic Park, earning also a spot in the Australia XV squad for the 1992 end-of-year tour in Ireland and Wales. He also played for the New South Wales Waratahs during the Super 12, where he captained the team between 1998 and 1999, until his retirement in 2000.

=== International career ===
Brial earned his first international cap for Australia against France in Bordeaux, on 30 October 1993, as a substitute for Ilie Tabua as blindside flanker. In the second test in Paris, he debuted in the starting XV as a loosehead flanker. He was not called up for the 1995 Rugby World Cup squad. In 1996 he played mostly as number 8 and earned ten caps. In July 1996, during the second Bledisloe Cup test against New Zealand in Brisbane, Brial furiously punched Frank Bunce, with whom he had a feud four years before in a provincial game. However, Brial was not sent out by the referee. His last cap was during the Bledisloe Cup test against New Zealand, on 23 October 1997, in Melbourne. In his entire international career he earned 13 caps in aggregate and scored 1 try and 5 points in aggregate. He also was part of the Australia national rugby sevens team which took part at the 1997 Rugby World Cup Sevens in Hong Kong.

== Personal ==
Brial is the father of Australian rugby player Joe Brial.
