= Henry Honiball =

South African rugby union player

- Born: Henry William Honiball; 1 December 1965 (age 60) Estcourt, South Africa
- Height: 1.85 m (6 ft 1 in)
- Weight: 98 kg (216 lb; 15 st 6 lb)
- School: Estcourt High School
- University: University of the Free State

Rugby union career
- Position(s): Fly-half, Centre
Senior career
Years	Team	Apps	(Points)
1999–2000	Bristol	13	(178)
Provincial / State sides
Years	Team	Apps	(Points)
1989–1991	Free State	38	
1992–1999	Sharks (Currie Cup)	111	
Super Rugby
Years	Team	Apps	(Points)
1996–1999	Sharks		(356)
International career
Years	Team	Apps	(Points)
1993–1999	South Africa	35	(156)
National sevens team
Years	Team		Comps
1994	South Africa		1

Henry William Honiball (born 1 December 1965) is a South African former professional rugby union footballer. He usually played at fly-half and sometimes as a centre.

Honiball played for Free State early in his career, but is best known for his time with Natal and the Sharks. Towards the end of his career he had a spell with English club Bristol. He won 35 caps for South Africa from 1993 to 1999, during the early post-apartheid era.

== Biography ==
Honiball had a very expansive running game which brought the loose-forwards into the game quickly. He was also tall for a fly-half and extremely physical, being a strong tackler and not afraid to take the ball and challenge the opposition. He earned his nickname of 'Lem', Afrikaans for 'blade', for his ability to 'cut' through his opponent's defence. Paired in the halves with Joost van der Westhuizen, Honiball was an integral part of Nick Mallett's Springbok squad which equalled the record of 17 consecutive Test victories, a record shared with New Zealand. Honiball played in 14 of the 17 victories, which included the clean sweep of the 1998 Tri Nations Series, the Springboks' first-ever series victory.

He made his debut in 1993 against Australia in Sydney, coming on as a replacement. Although South Africa lost the match 19–12, Honiball was also a member of the South Africa team that mauled Australia 61–22 during the 1997 Tri Nations tournament. However, in the aftermath of the record-equalling streak, Honiball was understood to have been affected by the surprise axing of captain and close friend Gary Teichmann. After the Springboks struggled to find their rhythm in the following year's Tri Nations tournament, Mallett had considered recalling Honiball for the match against New Zealand in Pretoria. He had only just returned from serious injury and was playing well for club side Natal, but revealed that he had suffered an ankle injury, so Mallett sent him to see a specialist in Johannesburg. Honiball retired from international rugby after the Springboks beat New Zealand in the 1999 Rugby World Cup third/fourth place play-off.

After the World Cup, he played one season for Bristol, amassing 283 points before a serious neck injury forced him to retire.

=== Test history ===
No.	Opposition	Result (SA 1st)	Position	Points	Date	Venue
1.	Australia	12–19	Replacement		21 August 1993	Sydney Football Stadium, Sydney
2.	Argentina	52–23	Fly-half		13 November 1993	Ferrocarril Oeste Stadium, Buenos Aires
3.	Samoa	60–8	Replacement		13 April 1995	Ellis Park, Johannesburg
4.	Fiji	43–18	Fly-half	10 (2 conversions, 2 penalties)	2 July 1996	Loftus Versfeld, Pretoria
5.	Australia	16–21	Fly-half	8 (1 conversion, 2 penalties)	13 July 1996	Sydney Football Stadium, Sydney
6.	New Zealand	32–22	Fly-half	8 (1 conversion, 2 penalties)	31 August 1996	Ellis Park, Johannesburg
7.	Argentina	46–15	Fly-half	9 (3 conversions, 1 penalty)	9 November 1996	Ferrocarril Oeste Stadium, Buenos Aires
8.	Argentina	44–21	Fly-half	14 (4 conversions, 2 penalties)	16 November 1996	Ferrocarril Oeste Stadium, Buenos Aires
9.	France	22–12	Fly-half	12 (4 penalties)	30 November 1996	Stade Chaban-Delmas, Bordeaux
10.	France	13–12	Fly-half	8 (1 conversion, 2 penalties)	7 December 1996	Parc des Princes, Paris
11.	Wales	37–20	Fly-half	10 (2 conversions, 2 penalties)	15 December 1996	Cardiff Arms Park, Cardiff
12.	Tonga	74–10	Fly-half		10 June 1997	Newlands, Cape Town
13.	British Lions	16–25	Fly-half	3 (1 penalty)	21 June 1997	Newlands, Cape Town
14.	British Lions	15–18	Fly-half		28 June 1997	Kings Park Stadium, Durban
15.	British Lions	35–16	Replacement	2 (1 conversion)	5 July 1997	Ellis Park, Johannesburg
16.	New Zealand	32–35	Replacement		19 July 1997	Ellis Park, Johannesburg
17.	Australia	20–32	Replacement		2 August 1997	Suncorp Stadium, Brisbane
18.	New Zealand	35–55	Centre	4 (2 conversions)	9 August 1997	Eden Park, Auckland
19.	Australia	61–22	Centre		23 August 1997	Loftus Versfeld, Pretoria
20.	Italy	62–31	Fly-half	17 (7 conversions, 1 penalty)	8 November 1997	Stadio Renato Dall'Ara, Bologna
21.	France	36–32	Fly-half	11 (4 conversions, 1 penalty)	15 November 1997	Stade de Gerland, Lyon
22.	France	52–10	Fly-half	22 (1 try, 7 conversions, 1 penalty)	22 November 1997	Parc des Princes, Paris
23.	England	29–11	Fly-half	7 (2 conversions, 1 penalty)	29 November 1997	Twickenham, London
24.	Wales	96–13	Replacement		27 June 1998	Loftus Versfeld, Pretoria
25.	England	18–0	Fly-half		4 July 1998	Newlands, Cape Town
26.	Australia	14–13	Fly-half		18 July 1998	Subiaco Oval, Perth
27.	New Zealand	13–3	Fly-half		25 July 1998	Athletic Park, Wellington
28.	New Zealand	24–23	Fly-half		15 August 1998	Kings Park, Durban
29.	Australia	29–15	Fly-half		29 August 1998	Ellis Park, Johannesburg
30.	Wales	28–20	Fly-half		14 November 1998	Wembley, London
31.	Scotland	35–10	Fly-half		21 November 1998	Murrayfield, Edinburgh
32.	Ireland	27–13	Fly-half		28 November 1998	Aviva Stadium (Lansdowne Road), Dublin
33.	England	7–13	Fly-half		5 December 1998	Twickenham, London
34.	Australia	21–27	Replacement		30 October 1999	Twickenham, London
35.	New Zealand	22–18	Fly-half	11 (1 conversion, 3 penalties)	4 November 1999	Millennium Stadium, Cardiff

== See also ==
- List of South Africa national rugby union players – Springbok no. 590
