= Taine Randell =

NZ international rugby union player

- Born: Taine Cheyenne Randell; 5 November 1974 (age 52) Hastings, New Zealand
- Height: 1.88 m (6 ft 2 in)
- Weight: 110 kg (17 st 5 lb; 243 lb)
- School: Lindisfarne College

Rugby union career
- Position(s): Flanker, Number eight
Senior career
Years	Team	Apps	(Points)
2003–2006	Saracens	70	(20)
Provincial / State sides
Years	Team	Apps	(Points)
1992–2002	Otago	83	((-))
Super Rugby
Years	Team	Apps	(Points)
1996–2003	Highlanders	77	(45)
International career
Years	Team	Apps	(Points)
1997–2002	New Zealand	51	(60)

Taine Randell (born 5 November 1974) is a retired New Zealand rugby union player. He played as a versatile loose forward and captained the All Blacks between 1996 and 1999.

In his 61-game tenure as an All Black, Randell played 51 tests, including 22 as captain. He also captained Otago in the National Provincial Championship (NPC) at the age of 19. His All Black debut was versus Italy 'A' at the age of 20, and his test debut versus Fiji, age 22. In his time as an All Black he scored 12 tries for a total of 60 points.

== Early career ==
Randell excelled as a rugby player, cricketer, and student at Lindisfarne College near Hastings and represented the First XV from the age of 14. In 1992 he went to the University of Otago where he completed degrees in law and commerce. He played for the University of Otago, Dunedin Metropolitan Colts and at the age of 17 years 5 months was picked by the Otago Coach Gordon Hunter for Otago in the National Provincial Championship. In 1993 he became the youngest player ever to captain Otago at age 19 years 152 days. In 1994 he moved to the Dunedin Rugby Football Club and was chosen for the New Zealand Colts as Captain. He played for the Otago Highlanders in 1996 in the opening season of the Super 14

Randell played his first game for the All Blacks in 1995 against an Italy A selection.

Randell was 21 when he first captained the All Blacks in South Africa in 1996 in four non-test games and only 23 when he first captained the All Blacks vs England in 1998. Randell was selected as captain to replace Sean Fitzpatrick by new coach John Hart. At the time there was some controversy about this selection as Randell was quite young and inexperienced and it is not clear that he himself wanted to be captain.

In 1999, Randell captaining the Otago Highlanders to an 8–3 regular season record and subsequently to the 1999 Super 12 Final where they lost to the Canterbury Crusaders in a closely fought match 24–19. Randell captained the Highlanders for seven years from 1997 to 2003.

Randell's low moment came during the 1999 Rugby World Cup where he led the team during the defeat to France in the semi-final. Randell left New Zealand to spend a month in Florida in the United States to get away from the negative media spotlight.

After this defeat, Todd Blackadder became captain, although Randell retained his place in the team for 2000–2002.

== Later career ==
When John Mitchell and Robbie Deans took over the coaching of the All Blacks from Wayne Smith and Tony Gilbert in October 2001 Randell was dropped from the All Blacks. He missed all of the 2002 Tri-Nations series, but after his form in the 2002 Super 12 season earned him a recall to captain the All Blacks on the end of the year tour of England, France and Wales. The tour resulted in one win against Wales (his last test as Captain), a draw with France, and a loss to England. During the tour Randell raised his test appearances past 50. He continued to play for the Highlanders, but left New Zealand before the 2003 Rugby World Cup.

On leaving New Zealand, Randell relocated with his family to Central London. He signed with the English Premier League team Saracens Rugby Club in August 2003. He retired at the end of their 2005–2006 season, despite offers from Saracens to return to play for 2006–07.

== Post rugby career ==
New Zealand Parliament
Years	Term	Electorate	List	Party
2026–present	55th	List	9	NZ First

Randell became a part owner in the big easy on the Kings Road.

Randell since 2010 became director of the Kahungunu Asset Holding Company, including a stake in the Fiordland Lobster Company, the country's largest exporter of live crayfish, marketed under its KiwiLobster brand.

On 15 April 2026, it was revealed that Randell will be standing as a candidate for New Zealand First in the Hawke's Bay electorate of Tukituki in the 2026 New Zealand general election. He was ranked ninth place on NZ First's party list. Based on preliminary results, Randell came third place in the Tukituki race by a margin of 8,933 votes on 7 November. He was elected into the New Zealand Parliament on the NZ First party list.

== Personal life ==
Randell was born in Hastings, New Zealand, and is of Ngāti Kahungunu and Waikato Tainui descent. He is married to Jo Edwards, and they have two sons and a daughter. At the end of 2008, the family returned to Havelock North, New Zealand.

Sporting positions
Preceded by Sean Fitzpatrick	All Blacks Captain; 1998–1999	Succeeded by Todd Blackadder
