= Richard Tombs =

Australian rugby union player

Richard Tombs (born 5 January 1968) is an Australian former professional rugby union player who played as a centre.

Tombs was born in Te Kūiti, New Zealand and educated at The Armidale School, New South Wales, Australia. He toured Britain with the Australian schools side in 1985–1986 before establishing himself within the New South Wales Waratahs team and winning his international caps. He won five international caps with Australia.

In 1997 he became one of the first three overseas professional players to join Gloucester Rugby in England, alongside Terry Fanolua and Philippe Saint-André. He remained at the club for three years, gaining a reputation for consistency; his centre partnership, with Fanolua, is still regarded as one of the club's best ever.

His wife is former Australian international netballer Carissa Tombs (née Dalwood), with whom he has three daughters. One of his daughters, Latika, has been a training partner with Giants Netball.
