= Danie van Schalkwyk =

South African rugby union player

- Born: 1 February 1975 (age 51) Boksburg, Gauteng, South Africa
- Height: 1.87 m (6 ft 2 in)
- Weight: 94 kg (207 lb)
- School: Hoërskool Kempton Park,

Rugby union career
- Position: Centre
Provincial / State sides
Years	Team	Apps	(Points)
1995–2001	Blue Bulls	80	
2002	Golden Lions		
Super Rugby
Years	Team	Apps	(Points)
1998–2001	Bulls		
2002	Cats		
International career
Years	Team	Apps	(Points)
1996–1997	South Africa	8	(10)

Danie van Schalkwyk (born 1 February 1975) is a South African former rugby union player who played as a centre.

== Playing career ==
Van Schalkwyk made his test debut for the Springboks in 1996 against Fiji at Loftus Versfeld in Pretoria, scoring a try on debut. He then played in three test matches during the New Zealand tour of South Africa in 1996. He played a further four Test matches in 1997, after which he did not make the Sprinbok team again.

== See also ==
- List of South Africa national rugby union players – Springbok no. 631
