= Bull Allen (rugby union) =

NZ international rugby union player

- Born: Mark Richard Allen; 27 July 1967 (age 59) Stratford, Taranaki, New Zealand
- Height: 1.83 m (6 ft 0 in)
- Weight: 115 kg (18 st 2 lb)
- School: Stratford High School

Rugby union career
- Position: Prop
Provincial / State sides
Years	Team	Apps	(Points)
1988–1996	Taranaki	110	(134)
1997	Central Vikings		
Super Rugby
Years	Team	Apps	(Points)
1996–1998	Hurricanes	30	(25)
International career
Years	Team	Apps	(Points)
1993–1997	New Zealand	8	(5)
- Correct as of 13 February 2007

Mark Richard Allen (born 27 July 1967), commonly known as Bull Allen, is a New Zealand former rugby union footballer and TV celebrity, reaching iconic status on the New Zealand sports scene in the 1990s. As well as 19 games and 8 test match appearances for New Zealand, Allen played 110 games for Taranaki and was captain of the inaugural Wellington Hurricanes Super 12 team. He was also captain of the first and short-lived Central Vikings team.

== Biography ==
=== Childhood ===
Mark Allen was born in Stratford, New Zealand, on 31 July 1967, to Steve Allen and Annette Richards. His father Steve ran an auto-electrical store which had been established by Steve's father Colin in 1945. Allen attended Stratford Primary School and received his secondary education at Stratford High School. He stood out in both wrestling and in rugby, representing the First XV in the latter.

=== Taranaki years ===
Upon leaving school Allen took up an apprenticeship with his father, and quickly stood out for Stratford in age-grade and club rugby as an exceptionally mobile prop forward. He played his first match for Taranaki in the annual Queens Birthday Weekend fixture in 1988 against Wanganui. Later that season he was selected for the Rugby News New Zealand Youth Team which toured Germany and Scotland and was coached by Fred Allen and Sid Going. It was on this tour that Allen picked up the nickname "Bull", coined by Going's nephew Quentin in reference to a character in the American TV Series Night Court then showing on New Zealand television. It was a nickname that was to stick for the remainder of his career and beyond.

In 1989 Allen secured a permanent place in the Taranaki front row, and in 1990 was awarded Taranaki player of the year after impressing with his strong scrummaging and hard running. He toured Canada with the New Zealand Development Team at the end of the year and just missed out on All Black selection when the All Black front row in France was plagued with injury, losing out to Olo Brown because he could not play tighthead prop.

In 1991 Allen struggled with asthma and the flu, and the Taranaki side was relegated to second division after finishing at the bottom of the table. In 1992 the team fought hard in a competitive second division and came out on top, returning to the first division the following year. Taranaki's success had a lot to do with the form and leadership of "Bull", who was appointed captain for the final four games. He scored two tries in his first match as captain, and two in the semi-final win against Manawatu, finishing the season with 10 tries and a reputation as the most mobile and dynamic prop forward in the country.

=== Selection for the All Blacks ===
1993 saw Allen selected for the All Blacks for the first time, making his first appearance in the test match against Samoa at Eden Park. He toured England and Scotland with the side at the end of the year, playing seven more games in the black jersey. The following year Richard Loe returned from suspension, and coach Laurie Mains controversially preferred Loe over Allen on the grounds Allen was too flashy and not strong enough as a scrummager. To add injury to insult Allen suffered a unique blow when he ripped his pectoral muscle almost completely in a match against Auckland and missed the rest of the season, which saw Taranaki again relegated to the second division.

Allen recovered in time to attend All Black training camps over the summer in preparation for the Rugby World Cup, although made the headlines after nearly drowning in a whitewater rafting accident. He trialled for the World Cup team, but was again rejected with 35-year-old Loe chosen ahead of him. Again, though, Allen led the Taranaki side to victory in the second division and a return to division one. His leadership proved crucial in the semi-final against Bay of Plenty when prop Gordon Slater appeared to have been the victim of foul play and was carried off with a broken leg, and that year was awarded the Hilary Commission Fair Play award. The "Bull Fan Club" was appeased when Allen was selected for the All Black tour of Italy and France where he played four games and scored a try against Cote Basque-Landes.

=== Wellington Hurricanes & Central Vikings ===
In 1996 Rugby Football became professional in New Zealand with the formation of the Super 12 involving teams from New Zealand, Australia and South Africa. Allen was appointed the inaugural captain of the Wellington Hurricanes team, and led them in New Zealand's first ever professional rugby football match. He made a test match appearance as a substitute against Scotland that season, and toured South Africa with the first All Black team to win a test match series against South Africa on their turf. The same weekend that the series was sealed, while Allen was in South Africa, Taranaki won the prestigious Ranfurly Shield in a victory over Auckland. However Allen's perceived lack of enthusiasm when put on the spot in an impromptu interview led to some bad feeling among some Taranaki supporters, and upon returning Allen did not resume the captaincy from Andy Slater. The end-of-year 80–34 defeat at the hands of Otago proved to be Allen's final appearance in the amber and black jersey after 110 games for the province.

The following year "Bull" joined the newly created Central Vikings team, which was a merger of the Manawatu and Hawkes Bay unions under Hurricanes coach Frank Oliver, in an attempt to form a more competitive team that could foot it in first division. Allen was named captain, but could not add a third second division victory to the two he'd won for Taranaki. He made four test match appearances in the New Zealand season as substitute against Argentina, South Africa and Australia, scoring his only test match try against Argentina. Selected for his second All Black tour of the UK, Allen made an appearance as substitute against Wales, and was selected for the starting line-up for the final match against England. This is commonly considered to have been the peak of Allen's rugby career. In 1998 Allen was devastated by a serious back injury when he was diagnosed with a prolapsed disc in his back. At the same time Allen recognised the priority of family life and decided to retire altogether from the game after playing 19 games and 8 test matches for the All Blacks and scoring two tries.

=== TV appearances ===
Allen was a well-known face on New Zealand TV with his shaved head, grin and personality. He hosted TV shows such as Ansett New Zealand Time of Your Life, The Footy Show and Game of Two-Halves.

In 2020, he made his one-game return as part of the reinforcement squad for Match Fit Squad for old boys All Blacks vs. Barbarians.

== All Blacks statistics ==
- Tests: 8
- Other matches: 19
- Total matches: 27
- Test points: 5pts (1t)
- Other points: 5pts (1t)
- Total points: 10pts (2t)

== Bibliography ==
- Harvey, John (1998), The Mark of the Bull. Moa Beckett Publishers Ltd, Auckland.
