= Craig Dowd =

NZ international rugby union player

- Born: Craig William Dowd; 26 October 1969 (age 57) Auckland, New Zealand
- Height: 6 ft 3 in (1.91 m)
- Weight: 115 kg (254 lb; 18.1 st)
- School: Liston College

Rugby union career
- Position: Prop
Senior career
Years	Team	Apps	(Points)
2001–2005	Wasps	115	(85)
Provincial / State sides
Years	Team	Apps	(Points)
1991–2001	Auckland	83	
Super Rugby
Years	Team	Apps	(Points)
1996–2001	Blues	64	(40)
International career
Years	Team	Apps	(Points)
1993–2000	New Zealand	60	(10)

Craig Dowd (born 26 October 1969) is a former rugby union player and ex-coach. He played 60 test matches for New Zealand between 1993 and 2000, during which time he formed one of the greatest front row combinations of all time with Sean Fitzpatrick and Olo Brown. He spent his entire provincial career with Auckland. He spent his entire Super 12 career, 64 matches, with the Auckland Blues, between 1996 and 2001 and is the official Blues player number 001, winning back-to-back titles in 1996 and 1997. From 2001 to 2005 he played for London Wasps in the Guinness Premiership, amassing 115 caps with the club. He started as Wasps won the 2002–03 Premiership Final, and two years later was a replacement when they won it again. Following his retirement as a player he took on a coaching role with the club. In 2009 he took up a position as the head coach for North Harbour in the Air New Zealand Cup.

In 2020, he finished season 1 of Match Fit, despite battling weight issues and sciatica. He managed to revert back to his playing weight.
