= Greg Smith (rugby union coach) =

- Born: c. 1949
- Died: 3 September 2002 (aged 52–53)

Rugby union career
- Position: Coach
Coaching career
- Years: Team
- 1996-1997: Australia
- 2000-2001: Fiji

Greg Smith (c. 1949 – 3 September 2002) was the former international rugby union coach of both the Australian national rugby union team (known widely as the Wallabies) and the Fijian national rugby union team.

He is probably best remembered for guiding the Australian team to a 12-match winning streak across Europe beating Italy, Scotland, Ireland and Wales.

Sporting positions
Preceded by (Australia) Bob Dwyer	Australia National Rugby Union Coach; 1996-1997	Succeeded by (Australia) Rod Macqueen
Preceded by (New Zealand) Brad Johnstone	Fiji National Rugby Union Coach; 2000-2001	Succeeded by (Fiji) Ifereimi Tawake (caretaker)
