= Glen Osborne =

NZ international rugby union player

- Born: August 27, 1971 (age 55) Wanganui
- Height: 1.85 m (6 ft 1 in)
- Weight: 85 kg (187 lb)

Rugby union career
- Position(s): Fullback, Wing
Provincial / State sides
| Years | Team | Apps | (Points) |
| 1990–1991 | Wanganui | 20 | (16) |
| 1992-99, 2001 | North Harbour | 69 | (166) |
Super Rugby
| Years | Team | Apps | (Points) |
| 1996-98 | Chiefs | 19 | (40) |
| 1999 | Hurricanes | 8 | (10) |
International career
| Years | Team | Apps | (Points) |
| 1995-99 | New Zealand | 29 | (85) |
| 1994-99 | Maori All Blacks | 9 | (53) |
National sevens team
| Years | Team | | Comps |
- New Zealand 7s

Glen Matthew Osborne (born 27 August 1971) is a former All Black, television presenter and current Police Constable for the New Zealand Police.

A nephew of 1975-82 Wanganui All Black Bill Osborne, he was born in Wanganui and received his secondary education at St Augustine's College. He played representative rugby for Wanganui in the National Provincial Championship from 1990 to 1991, then for North Harbour from 1992. He represented the Waikato Chiefs in the Super 12 competition from 1996.

Osborne made his test debut for the All Blacks against Canada in 1995, scoring two tries, and was the All Blacks' first choice as full back during the 1995 Rugby World Cup, where he played in five of New Zealand's six matches. He continued to play internationally until 1999, playing 19 test matches plus two appearances as a replacement. His final test was a 1999 Rugby World Cup match against Italy, where he scored two tries. He scored a career total of 11 test tries.

Osborne regularly appears on Māori Television, and is fluent in Te Reo Maori. He is filming a new television show Bring Your Boots, Oz where he is the presenter. Bring Your Boots, Oz is a heartland rugby series created by writer Dane Giraud (Find Me A Māori Bride), a celebration of rugby union and what it means to Māori.

In 2016, at the age of 44, Osborne graduated as a constable for the New Zealand Police.

In 2022, he revealed on season 2 of Match Fit that the professionalization of rugby coincided with his Super Rugby debut, which put his dreams of becoming a policeman on hold for 20 years. Health-wise: He looked fit, but he had high total blood cholesterol. Musically, however, both he and Charles Riechelmann can play the guitar. Osbourne turned the words from Ka Mate haka into a ballad. However: He and Piri Weepu, as fluent Maori speakers missed the powhiri and the song, then pulled out of the game against East Coast the next day with hamstring issues, but with injury toll mounting, he became an emergency backup as an unfamiliar spot as a flanker.
