= Charles Riechelmann =

NZ international rugby union player

- Born: Charles Calvin Riechelmann; 26 April 1972 (age 54) Nukuʻalofa, Tonga
- Height: 1.92 m (6 ft 4 in)
- Weight: 107 kg (16 st 12 lb)
- School: Auckland Grammar School

Rugby union career
- Position: Lock
Amateur team(s)
Years	Team	Apps	(Points)
- Grammar-Carlton
Provincial / State sides
Years	Team	Apps	(Points)
1994-1999	Auckland	76	(60)
Super Rugby
Years	Team	Apps	(Points)
1996-1999	Blues	42	(15)
International career
Years	Team	Apps	(Points)
1997	New Zealand	6	(15)

Charles Riechelmann (RICK-le-man, born 26 April 1972) is a former professional rugby union player who played as a lock. He played for Auckland provincially and the Blues in the Super Rugby competition. He was part of the Blues' title-winning teams in 1996 and 1997. Although he was born in Nukuʻalofa, Tonga, he played for New Zealand at international level, making him the first Tongan-born All Black. He played six test matches (in all cases as a reserve) for New Zealand in 1997, scoring three tries.

In 2020 and 2021/22, he completed two seasons of Match Fit with Classic All Blacks. He was one of the most flexible members in the group in season 2.
