= Sam Payne =

Australia international rugby union player (born 1971)

- Full name: Samuel John Payne
- Born: 11 November 1971 (age 55) Tamworth, NSW, Australia
- Height: 5 ft 9 in (175 cm)
- Weight: 176 lb (80 kg)

Rugby union career
- Position: Scrum-half
Super Rugby
Years	Team	Apps	(Points)
1996–2001	NSW Waratahs		
International career
Years	Team	Apps	(Points)
1996–1997	Australia	7	(5)

Samuel John Payne (born 11 November 1971) is an Australian former professional rugby union player who played as a scrum-half. He competed in the Super 12 for the NSW Waratahs, as well as overseas with Brive in France and Northland in New Zealand.

Payne, born in Tamworth, New South Wales, grew up on a Walcha farm and was educated at The Armidale School.

Payne was capped in seven Test matches for Australia across 1996 and 1997. For his appearances in 1996, Payne was the favoured scrum-half to George Gregan, who sat on the interchange bench.

Payne represented Australia at the 2001 Rugby World Cup Sevens, with the team losing the final to New Zealand.
