= Richard Harry =

- Born: Richard Lewis Lloyd Harry; 30 November 1967 (age 58) Sydney, Australia
- Height: 1.84 m (6 ft 0 in)

Rugby union career
- Position: Prop
Senior career
Years	Team	Apps	(Points)
1995–2001	New South Wales Waratahs	74	(74)
International career
Years	Team	Apps	(Points)
1996–2001	Australia	37	(5)

Richard Lewis Lloyd Harry (born 30 November 1967) is an Australian former rugby union player who played as a prop.

Harry was a hard-running loosehead prop and an integral part of the Wallabies during a golden era, which included clinching the Bledisloe Cup in 1998 and retaining it for the next three years, World Cup glory in 1999, and Tri Nations triumph in 2000.

Harry's playing career started in the back row as a flanker for Sydney club Eastwood, though he soon realised higher honours would not come if he remained there. He made the switch to the front row, dropping to 5th grade in the process to ply his trade. By the end of 1994, he was fast-tracked into the Emerging Wallabies and NSW selection came the following year.

In 1996, he was selected for his international debut for the Australia national team against Wales in Brisbane, and went on to record 37 Test caps over a memorable five-year period. In 2005 he was named at number one in an Australian Rugby Union team of the decade.

Harry is now a representative of the International Rugby Players' Association.

His father Philip Harry also served as President of the Australian Rugby Union in the late 1990s.

His son Edward Harry was a member of the Premiership-winning Woollahra Colleagues Whiddon Cup side in 2020.
