= Blair Larsen =

- Born: Blair Peter Larsen; 20 January 1969 (age 57) Takapuna, New Zealand
- Height: 1.98 m (6 ft 6 in)
- Weight: 107 kg (236 lb)
- School: Rosmini College
- Occupation(s): Police officer Rugby union coach

Rugby union career
- Position(s): Lock; Flanker
Senior career
Years	Team	Apps	(Points)
1998–2002	Kobelco Steelers		
Provincial / State sides
Years	Team	Apps	(Points)
1991–97, 2003	North Harbour		
1998	Northland	8	
Super Rugby
Years	Team	Apps	(Points)
1996–98	Chiefs	23	
International career
Years	Team	Apps	(Points)
1992–96	New Zealand	17	(4)

Blair Peter Larsen (born 20 January 1969) is a former New Zealand rugby union player. A lock and flanker, Larsen represented North Harbour and Northland at a provincial level and the Chiefs in Super Rugby. He was a member of the New Zealand national side, the All Blacks, from 1992 to 1996, playing 40 matches including 17 internationals.
