= Daniel Manu =

- Born: Daniel Tai Manu; 4 June 1970 (age 56) Tonga
- Height: 6 ft 5 in (196 cm)
- Weight: 252 lb (114 kg)
- School: Penrose High School
- Notable relative: Nasi Manu (nephew)

Rugby union career
- Position: Flanker
Amateur team(s)
Years	Team	Apps	(Points)
1990-1994	Ponsonby		
1994-1995	Eastwood		
Provincial / State sides
Years	Team	Apps	(Points)
1990-1994	Auckland		
1994-1995	New South Wales		
Super Rugby
Years	Team	Apps	(Points)
1996-2000	NSW Waratahs	43	(40)
International career
Years	Team	Apps	(Points)
1990	New Zealand U21		
1995-1997	Australia	15	(15)

Daniel Tai Manu is an Australian former rugby union footballer who played as flanker. He is of Tongan origin.

== Career ==
Manu was born in Tonga and educated at Penrose High School, in Auckland. He played for Auckland U18 and U20 teams, as well the senior team in the National Provincial Championship. After moving to Australia in 1994, Manu joined Eastwood and the following year, he played for the New South Wales representative team. Manu first made his first international test cap for Australia in the 1995 Rugby World Cup, against Romania, in Stellenbosch, at the Danie Craven Stadium, on 3 June 1995 when he was subbed on in the 28th minute as a substitute for David Wilson, and then subbed off in the 35th minute. His last cap for the Wallabies was on 2 August 1997, against South Africa, in Brisbane, at Lang Park. Manu is most known for his tackle on New Zealand winger Jonah Lomu during his second Bledisloe Cup test at Eden Park in Auckland. He also played in the Super 14 since its inception for New South Wales Waratahs until his retirement in 2000. Between 2011 and 2013, Manu was appointed coach for West Harbour RFC first-grade team. Currently, as of 2019, Manu was appointed managing director of CT Checkout Australia, a computer security company.

== Personal life ==
He is uncle to Nasi Manu, who plays for Tonga at international level, whose cousin Sika Manu is a rugby league player.

Daniel is married to Elsa and they have 5 children
