= Scott Bowen =

Australia international rugby union footballer (born 1972)

Scott Bowen (born 20 September 1972) is an Australian former rugby union player. He played in the position of fly-half and represented the Wallabies nine times between 1993 and 1996. He is currently an assistant with the NSW Waratahs in the Super Rugby tournament.

== Early life and education ==
Bowen was born in Sydney and attended Newington College (1985–1990) He played for the Australia national schoolboy rugby union team in 1990 and the Australian U21s.

== Representative Rugby career ==
Bowen played for Southern Districts Rugby Club from 1991 until 1996 and then moved to Eastern Suburbs in 1997. He also played one game of fourth grade for Southern Districts again in 2002 against Manly. He made his international debut for the Wallabies in 1993 v South Africa at the Sydney Football Stadium. Bowen played nine tests for Australia between 1993 and 1996 and 49 games for the NSW Waratahs between 1993 and 1999.

== Coaching career ==
He retired from rugby at the age of 26 and played Australian rules football in the Sydney club competition for 4 years.

In 2002, he joined Eastern Suburbs rugby club as assistant coach and the club won the Shute Shield the following year. He was appointed Eastern Suburbs head coach in 2006 and the club made a Grand Final appearance in 2007.
