= Marco Caputo =

Australia international rugby union player

- Full name: Marco Gabriele Caputo
- Born: 12 May 1971 (age 55) Canberra, Australia
- Height: 5 ft 11 in (180 cm)
- Weight: 231 lb (105 kg)

Rugby union career
- Position: Hooker
International career
| Years | Team | Apps | (Points) |
| 1996–97 | Australia | 5 | (5) |

Marco Gabriele Caputo (born 12 May 1971) is a former professional rugby union player who played as a hooker. Born in Canberra, Australia, he began his career with the ACT Brumbies. He went on to play for Bedford Blues, Worcester Warriors, Harlequins and AS Montferrand.

Caputo attended Canberra's Daramalan College. He won a national championship with the ACT schoolboys side in 1988 and was subsequently picked to tour New Zealand with the Australian Schoolboys.

Caputo represented Australia in five Test matches. He made his debut against Wales at Ballymore Stadium in 1996 and scored a try early in the first half His career included a Bledisloe Cup match in Dunedin in 1997.

Caputo played for the ACT Brumbies in the Super 12 from 1996 to 1999, after which he competed in Europe.

Caputo was named head coach of Italian club Mogliano in 2023. His son, Joey Caputo, also played professionally in Italy.
