= Marius Hurter =

South African rugby union footballer

- Born: Marius Hofmeyr Hurter; 8 October 1970 (age 56) Potchefstroom, North West, South Africa
- Height: 1.87 m (6 ft 2 in)
- Weight: 121 kg (267 lb)
- School: Technical High, Potchefstroom
- University: University of Pretoria

Rugby union career
- Position: Tighthead prop
Senior career
Years	Team	Apps	(Points)
1998–2004	Newcastle Falcons	110	(15)
Provincial / State sides
Years	Team	Apps	(Points)
1992–1993	Western Transvaal		
1994–1997	Northern Transvaal	62	
1998	Western Province	15	(5)
Super Rugby
Years	Team	Apps	(Points)
1998	Stormers	8	
International career
Years	Team	Apps	(Points)
1995–1997	South Africa	13	

Marius Hofmeyr Hurter (born 8 October 1970), is a former South African rugby union player who played for South Africa between 1995 and 1997. He was a member of the Springbok Squad that won the 1995 Rugby World Cup.

== Career ==
=== Provincial and club ===
Hurter made his provincial debut in 1992 for Western Transvaal and in 1994 moved to Northern Transvaal. In 1998 he relocated to Cape Town, to play for Western Province in the South African provincial competitions and for the Stormers in Super Rugby.

At the end of the 1998 South African season, Hurter moved to the United Kingdom and joined the Newcastle Falcons and played for the club from 1998 to 2004, winning the Anglo-Welsh Cup in 2001 and 2004.

=== International ===
He played his first game for the Springboks on 30 May 1995 against Romania during the 1995 Rugby World Cup. Hurter played in a total of thirteen test - and five tour matches, scoring one try in a tour match, for the Springboks.

=== Test history ===
No.	Opposition	Result (SA 1st)	Position	Tries	Date	Venue
1.	Romania	21–8	Tighthead prop		30 May 1995	Newlands, Cape Town
2.	Canada	20–0	Tighthead prop		3 Jun 1995	Boet Erasmus Stadium, Port Elizabeth
3.	Wales	40–11	Tighthead prop		2 Sep 1995	Ellis Park, Johannesburg
4.	Fiji	43–18	Tighthead prop		2 Jul 1996	Loftus Versfeld, Pretoria
5.	Australia	16–21	Tighthead prop		13 Jul 1996	Sydney Football Stadium, Sydney
6.	New Zealand	11–15	Tighthead prop		20 Jul 1996	Lancaster Park, Christchurch
7.	New Zealand	18–29	Tighthead prop		10 Aug 1996	Newlands, Cape Town
8.	New Zealand	19–23	Tighthead prop		17 Aug 1996	Kings Park, Durban
9.	New Zealand	26–33	Tighthead prop		24 Aug 1996	Loftus Versfeld, Pretoria
10.	New Zealand	32–22	Tighthead prop		31 Aug 1996	Ellis Park, Johannesburg
11.	New Zealand	32–35	Tighthead prop		19 Jul 1997	Ellis Park, Johannesburg
12.	New Zealand	35–55	Tighthead prop		9 Aug 1997	Eden Park, Auckland
13.	Australia	61–22	Tighthead prop		23 Aug 1997	Loftus Versfeld, Pretoria

== Accolades ==
In 2003 he was inducted into the University of Pretoria Hall of fame.

== See also ==
- List of South Africa national rugby union players – Springbok no. 627
