= Andrew Heath (rugby union) =

Australian rugby union international

- Full name: Andrew Duncan Heath
- Born: 22 October 1969 (age 57) Melbourne, Australia
- Height: 6 ft 1 in (185 cm)
- Weight: 260 lb (118 kg)

Rugby union career
- Position: Prop
International career
Years	Team	Apps	(Points)
1996–1997	Australia	8	(0)

Andrew Duncan Heath (born 22 October 1969) is an Australian former rugby union player who played as a prop. He was born and raised in Melbourne, attending Scotch College. He relocated to Sydney in 1992 to join Shute Shield club Eastern Suburbs and the following year made his debut for the New South Wales Waratahs. He was capped eight times for the Australia national team in 1996 and 1997, including a home Test against New Zealand at the Melbourne Cricket Ground. Following two seasons with the Queensland Reds in 1998 and 1999, he then had stints overseas, at French club AS Béziers and later Wellington in New Zealand provincial rugby.

== See also ==
- List of Australia national rugby union players
