= Michael Foley (rugby union) =

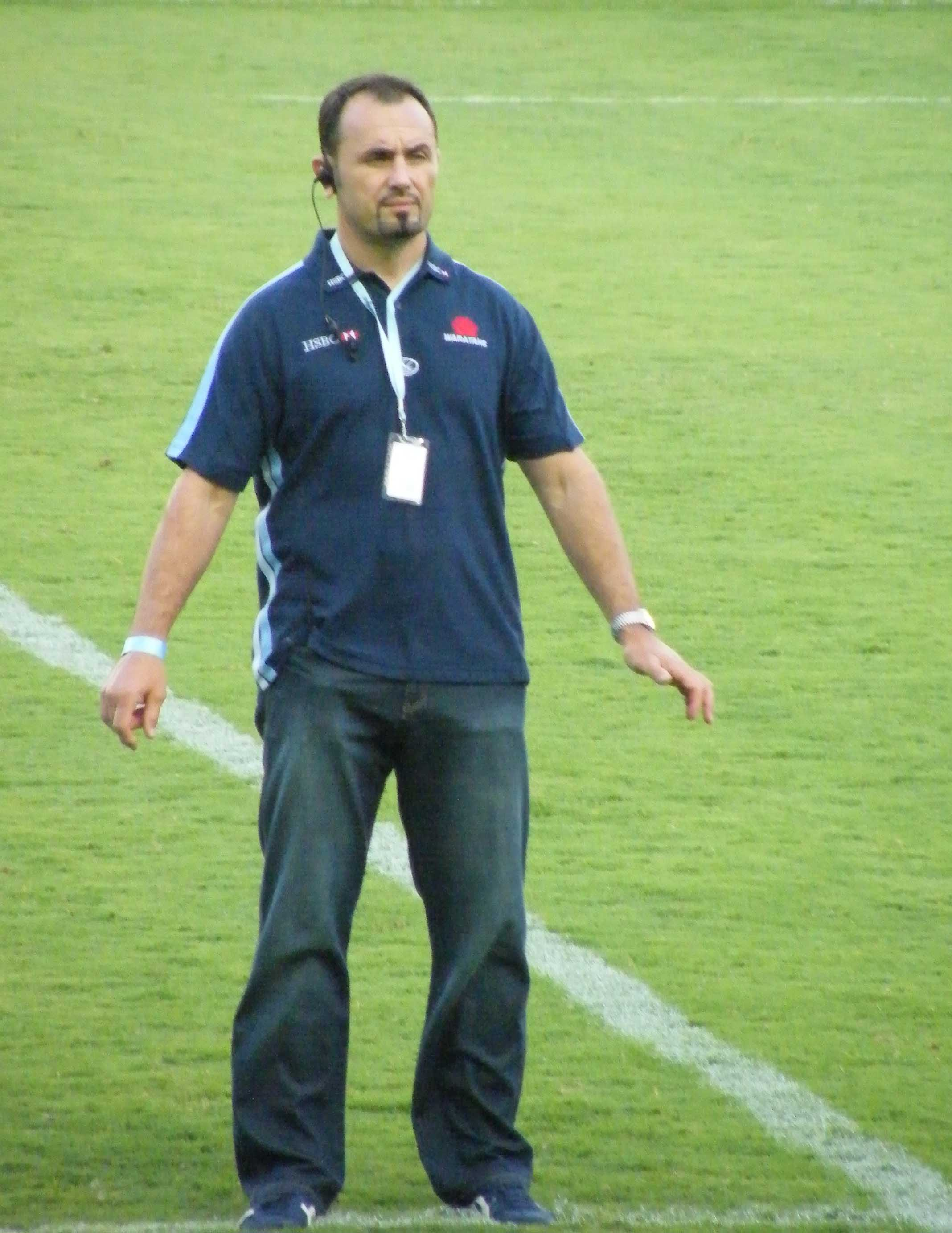
- Michael Foley as NSW Waratahs head coach
- Born: Michael Anthony Foley; 7 June 1967 (age 59) Sydney, Australia
- Height: 5 ft 11 in (1.80 m)
- Weight: 233 lb (106 kg; 16 st 9 lb)

Rugby union career
- Position: Hooker
Super Rugby
Years	Team	Apps	(Points)
1996–2001	Reds	111	
International career
Years	Team	Apps	(Points)
1995–2001	Australia	50	(20)
Coaching career
- Years: Team
- 2013–16: Western Force
- 2011–12: Waratahs

Michael Foley (born 7 June 1967 in Sydney, Australia) is a former hooker for the Australia national rugby union team and former Super Rugby head coach of the Western Force and New South Wales Waratahs teams.

Foley competed in the Gladiator Individual Sports Athletes Challenge in 1995.

== Playing career ==
A product of St Patrick's College, Strathfield, he represented New South Wales Schoolboys, Australian Schoolboys and NSW U21s. Foley played his club rugby for both Wests and Souths rugby clubs in Brisbane and, despite being born in Sydney, went on to win 111 state caps for Queensland Reds, 63 in the Super 12 competition.

He made his test debut 31 May 1995 as a replacement against Canada during the 1995 Rugby World Cup. He was a key member in the 1999 Rugby World Cup winning side and again in the side that was victorious over the 2001 British Lions. His final cap was a victory against Wales on 25 November 2001 at the age of 34.

He retired from top-flight rugby in 2001 after notching up 50 international caps.

== Coaching ==
Immediately after retiring in 2001, he became the forward coach of Bath Rugby in the Aviva Premiership league. In 2006, he left Bath to become an assistant coach for the Wallabies. He then signed on to become an assistant coach for the NSW Waratahs under Chris Hickey, whom he replaced at the end of the 2011 season. He became the Waratahs' seventh head coach in the team's history, but only remained in charge for one season before taking over at the Western Force. Foley was the Western Force's third coach and remained in the role for four years before vacating the position in 2016.
