= Ruben Kruger =

South African rugby union player

- Born: Ruben Jacobus Kruger; 30 March 1970 Vrede, Free State, South Africa
- Died: 27 January 2010 (aged 39) Pretoria, Gauteng, South Africa
- Height: 1.88 m (6 ft 2 in)
- Weight: 101 kg (223 lb)
- School: Grey College, Bloemfontein
- Notable relative: Henco Venter (nephew)

Rugby union career
- Position: Flanker
Provincial / State sides
Years	Team	Apps	(Points)
1991–1993	Free State	36	(20)
1993–2000	Northern Transvaal	96	(135)
Super Rugby
Years	Team	Apps	(Points)
1996–2000	Bulls	10	(5)
International career
Years	Team	Apps	(Points)
1993–1999	South Africa	36	(35)
National sevens team
Years	Team		Comps
1993	South Africa 7s		3

Ruben Jacobus Kruger (30 March 1970 – 27 January 2010) was a South African rugby union player. He played as a flanker. He had two daughters Zoë (b. 2002) and Isabella (b. 2005). Isabella played quarter final on the junior tournament at the 2022 Wimbledon Championships.

== Playing career ==
=== Provincial ===
A product of Grey College in Bloemfontein, Kruger played for the Free State schools team at the annual Craven Week tournament in 1987 and 1988 and gained selection for the South African Schools team in both years. After representing the Free State under-20 team in 1989 and 1990, he made his senior provincial debut for the Free State in 1991. During 1993, Kruger moved to Northern Transvaal and played for the union until 2000. In 1995 Ruben Kruger was named South African Rugby Football Union's player of the year.

=== International ===
Kruger played for the South Africa national rugby union team between 1993 and 1999. He played his first test match for the Springboks on 6 November 1993 against Argentina at the Ferro Carril Oeste Stadium in Buenos Aires.

In 1995, he played in the Rugby World Cup. During this tournament, he made 5 starts, and scored 1 try, in the controversial semi-final against the France national rugby union team. Kruger also played in the 1999 World Cup and in addition to his 36 test matches, he also played in 20 tour matches and scored 14 tries.

=== Test history ===
World Cup final

No.	Opposition	Result (SA 1st)	Position	Tries	Date	Venue
1.	Argentina	29–26	Flank		6 Nov 1993	Ferro Carril Oeste, Buenos Aires
2.	Argentina	52–23	Flank		13 Nov 1993	Ferro Carril Oeste, Buenos Aires
3.	Scotland	34–10	Flank		19 Nov 1994	Murrayfield, Edinburgh
4.	Wales	20–12	Flank		26 Nov 1994	Cardiff Arms Park, Cardiff
5.	Samoa	60–8	Flank		13 Apr 1995	Ellis Park, Johannesburg
6.	Australia	27–18	Flank		25 May 1995	Newlands, Cape Town
7.	Romania	21–8	Flank		30 May 1995	Newlands, Cape Town
8.	Samoa	42–14	Flank		10 Jun 1995	Ellis Park, Johannesburg
9.	France	19–15	Flank	1	17 Jun 1995	Kings Park, Durban
10.	New Zealand	15–12	Flank		24 Jun 1995	Ellis Park, Johannesburg
11.	Wales	40–11	Flank		2 Sep 1995	Ellis Park, Johannesburg
12.	Italy	40–21	Flank		12 Nov 1995	Stadio Olimpico, Rome
13.	England	24–14	Flank		18 Nov 1995	Twickenham, London
14.	Fiji	43–18	Flank		2 Jul 1996	Loftus Versfeld, Pretoria
15.	Australia	16–21	Flank		13 Jul 1996	Sydney Football Stadium (SFG), Sydney
16.	New Zealand	11–15	Flank		20 Jul 1996	AMI Stadium, Christchurch
17.	Australia	25–19	Flank		3 Aug 1996	Free State Stadium, Bloemfontein
18.	New Zealand	18–29	Flank		10 Aug 1996	Newlands, Cape Town
19.	New Zealand	19–23	Flank		17 Aug 1996	Kings Park, Durban
20.	New Zealand	26–33	Flank	1	24 Aug 1996	Loftus Versfeld, Pretoria
21.	New Zealand	32–22	Flank		31 Aug 1996	Ellis Park, Johannesburg
22.	Argentina	46–15	Flank		9 Nov 1996	Ferro Carril Oeste, Buenos Aires
23.	Argentina	44–21	Flank	2	16 Nov 1996	Ferro Carril Oeste, Buenos Aires
24.	France	22–12	Flank		30 Nov 1996	Stade Chaban-Delmas, Bordeaux
25.	France	13–12	Flank		7 Dec 1996	Parc des Princes, Paris
26.	Wales	37–20	Flank		15 Dec 1996	Cardiff Arms Park, Cardiff
27.	Tonga	74–10	Flank	2	10 Jun 1997	Newlands, Cape Town
28.	British Lions	16–25	Flank		21 Jun 1997	Newlands, Cape Town
29.	(British & Irish Lions) British Lions	15–18	Flank		28 Jun 1997	Kings Park, Durban
30.	New Zealand	32–35	Flank		19 Jul 1997	Ellis Park, Johannesburg
31.	Australia	20–32	Flank		2 Aug 1997	Suncorp Stadium, Brisbane
32.	New Zealand	35–55	Flank	1	9 Aug 1997	Eden Park, Auckland
33.	New Zealand	18–34	Flank		7 Aug 1999	Loftus Versfeld, Pretoria
34.	Australia	10–9	Replacement		14 Aug 1999	Newlands, Cape Town
35.	Spain	47–3	Flank		10 Oct 1999	Murrayfield, Edinburgh
36.	New Zealand	22–18	Replacement		4 Nov 1999	Millennium Stadium, Cardiff

=== World Cups ===
- 1995: world champions, 5 selections (Wallabies, Romania, Samoa, France, All Blacks).
- 1999: 2 selections (Spain, All Blacks).

== Later career ==
At the end of his rugby career, he became a camera salesman. He owned a Minolta franchise in Pretoria. He was portrayed in Invictus, a film about Nelson Mandela and the 1995 Springboks, by Grant Roberts.

== Death ==
Kruger died in Pretoria on 27 January 2010 after battling brain cancer for 10 years. He was two months short of his 40th birthday.

== See also ==
- List of South Africa national rugby union players – Springbok no. 596
- List of South Africa national under-18 rugby union team players
- List of South Africa national rugby sevens players
