= Gary Teichmann =

South African rugby union player

- Born: Gary Hamilton Teichmann; 9 January 1967 (age 59) Gwelo, Rhodesia
- Height: 6 ft 5 in (1.96 m)
- Weight: 220 lb (100 kg)
- School: Hilton College
- University: Cedara College of Agriculture; University of Natal

Rugby union career
- Position: Number eight
Amateur team(s)
Years	Team	Apps	(Points)
1987–1991	Natal University (Maritzburg)		
Senior career
Years	Team	Apps	(Points)
1991–1999	Sharks (Currie Cup)	144	
1999–2001	Newport	52	(35)
Super Rugby
Years	Team	Apps	(Points)
1996–1999	Sharks		(40)
International career
Years	Team	Apps	(Points)
1995–1999	South Africa	42	(30)

Gary Hamilton Teichmann (born 9 January 1967) is a retired South African professional rugby union player. He played number eight and captained the South African national team, the Springboks, between 1995 and 1999.

== Early career ==
Teichmann was born in Gwelo, Rhodesia. He moved to South Africa with his family when he was 11 years old. He was educated at Hilton College.

Teichmann started his career playing club rugby for the University of Natal team in Pietermaritzburg before being spotted by the Natal Province's Currie Cup team in 1991. He was soon promoted to captain by then Natal coach Ian McIntosh and played for Natal in three Currie Cup victories in 1992, 1995, and 1996 (Captain in 1995 and 1996). The team under Teichmann also finished in second place in 1993 and 1999 and made it to the final of the Super 10 (the precursor to the Super 12 and Super 14) competition in 1994. The Natal Currie Cup team became the core of the team now known as the Sharks when the Super 12 competition began in 1996, and Teichmann also captained that side. After the team was renamed the Sharks in 1998 he led them to the final of the Super 12. In all, Teichmann represented Natal and the Sharks in 144 matches.

== Springbok captain ==
In 1993, he was selected for the Springbok tour to Argentina, and in 1994 he was again selected as part of the squad that toured Wales and Scotland. It wasn't until 2 September 1995 that he played his first full international as a Springbok, however. He scored a try in his debut test as the Springboks went on to defeat Wales 40–11 at Ellis Park.

After playing only 6 test matches for the Springboks, Teichmann was appointed as captain of the squad in 1996, and went on to become one of South Africa's most successful captains ever. He captained the Springboks in 36 tests between 1996 and 1999, with 27 of those (72%) ending in victory. The Springboks, with Teichmann at the helm, were considered by many the greatest South African team in history.

Between 1997 and 1998, the Springboks went on a record winning streak of 17 consecutive test matches. As part of their unbeaten run, they won the 1998 Tri Nations Series undefeated, beating both Australia and New Zealand away from home. They kicked off the feat with a record dismantling of Australia to win 61–22 at Loftus Versfeld in Pretoria and ended with a defeat against England at Twickenham at the end of a long tour.

A list of record victories during that period includes:

- 23 July 1997: South Africa 61–22 Australia at Loftus Versfeld, Pretoria
- 22 November 1997: South Africa 52–10 France at Parc des Princes, Paris
- 6 December 1997: South Africa 68–10 Scotland at Murrayfield, Edinburgh
- 27 July 1998: South Africa 96–13 Wales at Loftus Versfeld, Pretoria

Although not records, they also beat Ireland 33–0 at Loftus and Italy 74–3 in Port Elizabeth. In all Teichmann played 42 tests for the Springboks, and held the record for the most consecutive test matches played for the Springboks with 39. This has since been surpassed by another Springbok captain, John Smit.

== Later years ==
In 1999, coach Nick Mallett, who thought that Teichmann had lost most of his form, controversially dropped him from the squad shortly before the 1999 Rugby World Cup. The Springbok squad's performance suffered after Teichmann was dropped until 2000 when Mallett resigned as coach of the Springboks. Mallett has since admitted that with the benefit of hindsight, dropping Teichmann was a big mistake.

Teichmann described himself as "gutted" after being left out of the squad. He moved to Wales where he played for the Newport club. He captained Newport to their first Principality Cup win in 24 years in 2001, announcing his retirement from rugby shortly after. He also wrote his autobiography, For the Record, during this time.

As of 2005, Teichmann serves in an advisory capacity on the board of The Sharks (Pty) Ltd. He lives in Durban and runs a successful earthmoving business.

Sporting positions
Preceded by Adriaan Richter	Springbok Captain; 1996–99	Succeeded by Corné Krige
