= Olo Brown =

- Born: Olo Max Brown; 24 October 1967 (age 59) Apia, Samoa
- Height: 1.83 m (6 ft 0 in)
- Weight: 110 kg (243 lb)

Rugby union career
- Position: Prop
Provincial / State sides
Years	Team	Apps	(Points)
- Auckland
Super Rugby
Years	Team	Apps	(Points)
1996–1998	Blues	33	(15)
International career
Years	Team	Apps	(Points)
1990–1998	New Zealand	69	(20)

Olo Max Brown (born 24 October 1967) is a former rugby union player. Born in Apia, Samoa, he played 56 tests as a prop for the New Zealand national team, the All Blacks, from 1992 to 1998, missing only two tests in that time.

He suffered neck and back injuries which ended his rugby playing days, and retired to become an accountant. By 2021, he worked in private equity, including most recently being responsible for investor relations for the Punakaiki Fund.
