= Frank Bunce =

NZ & Samoa international rugby union player

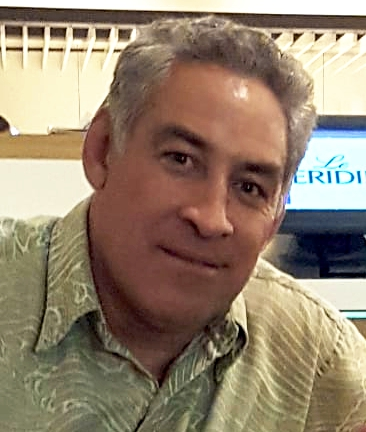
- Bunce in 2019
- Born: Frank Eneri Bunce; 4 February 1962 (age 64) Auckland, New Zealand
- Height: 1.80 m (5 ft 11 in)
- Weight: 85 kg (13 st 5 lb)
- School: Mangere College
- University: Auckland University

Rugby union career
- Position: Centre
Provincial / State sides
Years	Team	Apps	(Points)
1986–1990	Auckland		
1991–1998	North Harbour		
Super Rugby
Years	Team	Apps	(Points)
1996–1998	Chiefs		
International career
Years	Team	Apps	(Points)
1991	Western Samoa	4	(4)
1992–1997	New Zealand	55	(96)
National sevens team
Years	Team		Comps
1993	New Zealand		

Frank Eneri Bunce (born 4 February 1962) is a retired New Zealand rugby union player and coach. He played international rugby for both Western Samoa and New Zealand in the 1990s, appearing in the 1991 and 1995 World Cups. He played in four international matches for Samoa and 55 for New Zealand (the All Blacks).

== Biography ==
Bunce was born in Auckland, New Zealand, and attended Mangere College. He has five children. He is the great nephew of Sir Robert Rex, the premier of Niue.

He wrote an autobiography, Frank Confessions, published in 1998, and contributed to the book Rugby Skills, Tactics and Rules with Tony Williams, published in 2008.

=== Playing career ===
Bunce began his representative career at the Manukau club, and progressed to Auckland B in 1984 and then Auckland in 1986, the same year he was selected for the North Island team. He remained with Auckland until 1990, not usually a first choice player, although he did play in the trial for the All Blacks in 1988. In 1991 he moved to North Harbour.

Though mainly of Niuean descent, he was selected to play for Western Samoa, receiving international attention at the 1991 World Cup where the Samoan team reached the quarter-finals. These performances brought him to the attention of New Zealand coach Laurie Mains who selected him to play for the All Blacks in 1992.

Bunce became a regular feature of the All Black backline, missing only one game (against Japan at the 1995 World Cup) until his last game on 6 December 1997 against England in London. He played for New Zealand in the NZRU's centenary games against a World XV, against the British and Irish Lions in their 1993 tour, in the 1995 Rugby World Cup final, the first two Tri Nations tournaments and the victorious series win over South Africa in 1996. He captained New Zealand once in a non-test game, and also played for New Zealand at the first Sevens World Cup in 1993. He scored 20 international tries (96 points) for New Zealand, and one try (4 points) for Samoa.

He played for the Chiefs until 1998, and played one season for Castres in France, and one season for Bristol in England before retiring in 1999.

At the close of his international career he was 35 years and 305 days old, a ripe old age for an international rugby player. He was the second-oldest All Black ever and New Zealand's most capped test centre (outside centre) at the time, and oldest back. Conrad Smith has the most caps as an All Black outside centre overall (85 - as at 22.05.15) Though best known as an excellent defensive player, he was also a strong attacking player in his own right. Bunce's powerful running and strength when tackled allowed the backs outside him to shine.

=== Coaching career ===
Bunce coached in Italy from 2001 to 2003, was Auckland's defence coach in 2004 and served as a technical advisor to Samoa in 2005. He is a position-specific coach for the International Rugby Academy in New Zealand.

== Personal life ==
As of 2 November 2020, he is a father of 6, with the oldest at 34, and the youngest less than a year old. He is married to his second wife, Jessica Worchel Bunce. He finished season 1 of Match Fit as a participant and returned in season 3 as former Rugby Union representatives vs. Rugby League team in a game of full contact Beach-Five, or Five-A-Side First-Tackle Rugby League. In 2024, he returned for Match Fit: Union vs. League. Due to his poor knees, he opted at bike-based training.
