= John Hart (rugby union coach) =

NZ rugby union player & coach

John Hart CNZM
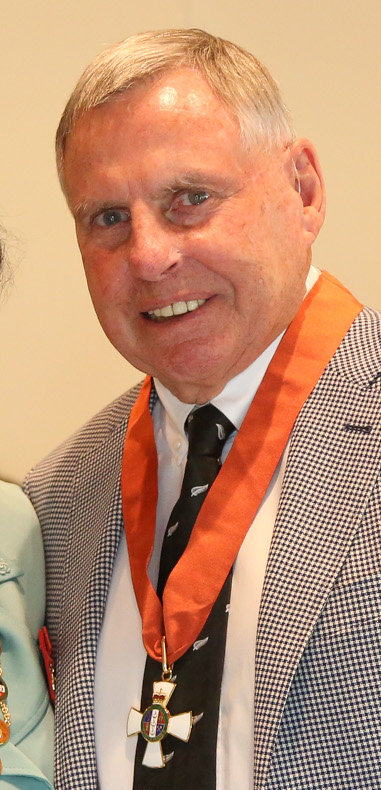
- Hart in 2025
- Born: John Bernard Hart; 1945 (age 80–81); Auckland, New Zealand
- Education: Mount Roskill Grammar School
- Alma mater: University of Auckland

Rugby union career
- Position: Halfback
Amateur team(s)
| Years | Team | Apps | (Points) |
- Waitemata
Provincial / State sides
| Years | Team | Apps | (Points) |
- Auckland
Coaching career
- Years: Team
- 1982–1985: Auckland
- 1987, 1991, 1996–1999: New Zealand

John Bernard Hart CNZM (born 1945) is a former New Zealand rugby union player and coach. He coached and managed both the All Blacks and the Auckland rugby union team, and played for the Waitemata club and the Auckland provincial team.

== Early years and playing career ==
Hart was born in Auckland to father Joe, who worked for the bicycle importing company W.H. Worrall and Company, and mother Joan. He was the second of four children; he had an older brother, Graeme, a younger sister Loraine and a younger brother, Ian.

Hart was educated at Mount Roskill Grammar School, where he was best all-round sportsman, head of his house and deputy prefect in his final year. He then enrolled in a Bachelor of Commerce at University of Auckland in hope of becoming an accountant, but his attention was more focused towards leisure than his studies. Hart no longer qualified for a bursary after failing more subjects in his second year, forcing him to complete his degree part-time.

He was later appointed Group Employee Relations Director for Fletcher Challenge, then New Zealand's largest company.

== Coaching at Auckland ==
Hart began his first class coaching career for Auckland in 1982. He coached Auckland to the National Provincial Championship (NPC) title in 1982, 1984 and 1985, and it was during his tenure that, in 1985, Auckland won the Ranfurly Shield from Canterbury and began the series of 61 successful defences that remains a record in shield history.

Hart, together with Alex Wyllie, was an assistant coach under Brian Lochore when the All Blacks won the first Rugby World Cup in 1987. In 1988, Lochore retired from coaching and Wyllie was appointed to succeed him, an appointment that upset many, especially Auckland, fans. Hart then initially refused to be part of the selection panel but eventually returned as a selector, but was eventually appointed co-coach with Wyllie for the 1991 Rugby World Cup. In hindsight, this was widely regarded to be a mistake: the personality clash between the two coaches was reflected in a split within the squad into Auckland and Canterbury factions.

Following the All Blacks' loss to Australia in the semi-finals, Wyllie resigned, while Hart sought to become head coach, but was beaten to the post by the then Otago coach Laurie Mains.

Mains coached the All Blacks to the final of the 1995 Rugby World Cup, which was won by South Africa, continued as coach for a year-end tour to France, after which he resigned and was replaced by Hart. During Hart's tenure as head coach, the All Blacks achieved their first ever series win in South Africa, in 1996, and won the Tri-Nations three times, in 1996/97 and 1999. But when New Zealand lost unexpectedly to France in the semi-final of the 1999 Rugby World Cup, Hart, like his immediate predecessors, resigned. As head coach, Hart was in charge of the All Blacks for 41 games, winning 31, drawing one and losing nine.

In 1990, Hart was the coach of a New Zealand Under-21 side that toured Australia. Martin Johnson, who captained England to the title at the 2003 Rugby World Cup, was one of the players in the squad.

== Life after coaching ==
In January 2005, Hart was appointed to the Board of Cullen Sports, owners of the New Zealand Warriors, a New Zealand rugby league club, for which he later served as the Executive Director of Football. He also served on the boards of a number of other companies, provides consultancy services in the fields of human resources and leadership, and is an active speaker on the lecture circuit. In December 2011 Hart resigned from the Warriors and took up a position as the New Zealand PGA Pro-Am organising committee chairman.

In the 1997 Queen's Birthday Honours, Hart was appointed an Officer of the New Zealand Order of Merit, for services to rugby. In the 2025 New Year Honours, he was promoted to Companion of the Order, for services to sports governance.

Hart is the co-author (with Paul Thomas) of two books, Straight from the Hart (1993) and Change of Hart (1997) (ISBN 1869585712); the latter gives a first-hand account of the transition to professional rugby, in which he played a significant part.

== Bibliography ==
- Thomas, Paul (1993). Straight From The Hart. Auckland: Moa Beckett Publishers. ISBN 1-86958-015-X.

| Preceded by Laurie Mains | All Blacks coach 1996–1999 | Succeeded by Wayne Smith |
