= Caprice =

Caprice, from the Italian capriccio, may refer to:

== Art and entertainment ==
- Caprice (1913 film), a film starring Mary Pickford
- Caprices (film), a 1942 French comedy film
- Caprice, a 1950 musical by Sandy Wilson
- Caprice (1967 film), a film starring Richard Harris and Doris Day
- Caprice (1997 film), a film produced by Nicholas Tabarrok
- Caprice (2015 film), a 2015 French film directed by Emmanuel Mouret
- Capriccio (art) or caprice, in painting, an architectural fantasy
- A Caprice, a c. 1894 painting by Aubrey Beardsley
- Capriccio (music) or caprice, a piece of music usually free in form and of a lively character
  - 24 Caprices for Solo Violin (Paganini)
- Caprichos (The Caprices), a series of prints by Goya
- Caprice, a 1917 novel by Ronald Firbank
- Caprice, a 1929 adaptation by Philip Moeller of a play by Sil-Vara
- Caprice, a 1976 play by Charles Ludlam
- Caprice (band), a Moscow-based musical group
- Caprice Records (Sweden), a Swedish record label operated by the state-owned Swedish Performing Arts Agency under the Ministry of Culture
- Caprice Records (US), a short-lived (1960–1963) American record label founded by Gerry Granahan
- "Caprice", a 1956 trumpet solo by James F. Burke
- "Caprice", a song by The Wildhearts from P.H.U.Q., 1995

== People ==
=== Given name ===
- Caprice Benedetti (born 1965), American actress
- Caprice Bourret (born 1971), American model, actress and businesswoman
- Caprice Cayetano (born 2008), Filipino actress
- Caprice Coleman (born 1977), American professional wrestler
- Caprice Crane (born 1970), American writer
- Caprice Dydasco (born 1993), American soccer player

=== Surname ===
- Alphonse "Big Boy" Caprice, fictional character from Dick Tracy
- Daniel Caprice (born 1989), British rugby player
- Frank Caprice (1962–2025), Canadian ice hockey player
- Jake Caprice (born 1992), British footballer
- June Caprice (1895–1936), American actress
- Little Caprice (born 1988), Czech pornographic actress

== Transportation ==
- Caprice 15, a Canadian sailboat design
- Chevrolet Caprice, an American automobile manufactured from 1965 to 1996
- Holden Caprice, an Australian automobile produced by General Motors–Holden between 1990 and 2017
- Statesman (automobile) or Statesman Caprice, an Australian automobile produced by General Motors–Holden 1974–1985
- USS Caprice, several ships of the United States Navy
- Caprice (pilot boat), a 19th-century New York pilot boat

== Restaurants ==
- Caprice (restaurant), a French restaurant at the Hong Kong Four Seasons Hotel
- Café Caprice, restaurant in Cape Town, South Africa
- Le Caprice, restaurant in London, England

== Places ==
- Caprice, Ghana, a suburb of Accra

== See also ==
- Capriccio (disambiguation)
- Capricious (disambiguation)
