= Kate Normington =

South African actress, singer/songwriter

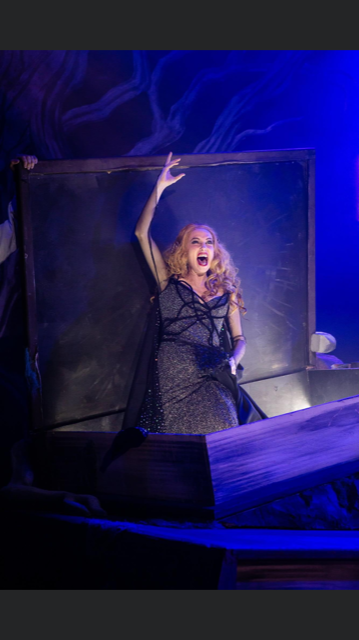
- Normington as "The Witch" in Pieter Toerien's Production of Into the Woods at the Pieter Toerien Theatre in 2019
- Born: Johannesburg, South Africa
- Education: University of Witwatersrand
- Occupations: Actress, singer, songwriter
- Years active: 1987–present

Kate Normington is a South African actress, singer, and songwriter. Normington first rose to national prominence playing Sister Mary Amnesia in the Alhambra Theatre's production of Nunsense in 1987, and has appeared on the West End and South African stage, and in local and international film and television productions.

== Early life ==
Normington grew up in Johannesburg, South Africa and attended Pretoria Girls' High School and Marist Brothers Observatory (Sacred Heart College). She studied Speech and Drama at the University of the Witwatersrand, graduating in 1987.

== Career ==
=== Theatre ===
==== Career beginnings ====
After performing as a cabaret singer at Piaf in Johannesburg (alongside Didi Kriel), Normington's first professional role was in Tarts, by Kevin Feather, at La Parisienne Theatre in Johannesburg. This was followed by her breakthrough role playing Sister Mary Amnesia in Tobie Cronje's production of Nunsense at the Alhambra Theatre in 1987, which garnered Normington her first Fleur du Cap Award for Best Actress in a Musical. She followed this successful turn with the Trilogy of '87 at the Durban Playhouse, where she performed a triple role as Joanna in Sweeney Todd, Niki in Sweet Charity, and also appeared in Candide, in a cycle in which all three productions were staged on the same day, one after the other.

In 1989, Normington was cast as Guinevere in the State Theatre's production of Camelot, understudied by Gaynor Young. The production became infamous when, replacing Normington in December, Young fell down an unguarded lift shaft while on stage, landing on concrete 5 storeys below and going into a coma for 5 weeks.

Throughout the late '80s and early '90s, Normington was in several successful and high-profile shows across South Africa, including playing Josephine in Romance Romance, Eliza in My Fair Lady in 1990, and Janet in The Rocky Horror Show in 1993; appearing in A Touch of Webber... A Taste of Rice, an original show by Richard Loring, in 1991; and playing Sheila in Janice Honeyman's production of Hair, one of the first in South Africa following its unbanning, at the Civic Theatre in 1994.

==== The West End and the UK ====
In 1993, Normington left for England to pursue her career on international stages. Her first job in London was in the West End production of Sunset Boulevard in its initial run in 1993, which featured Patti LuPone as Norma Desmond, in which Normington understudied the role of Betty Schaefer. After encountering some passport trouble, she was forced to return home to South Africa, appearing in Tell Me On A Sunday in 1994, before she was able to return to England. Upon her return, Normington returned to the cast of Sunset Boulevard at the Adelphi Theatre, understudying Betty Buckley, Elaine Paige, and Petula Clark for the role of Norma Desmond, appearing in the role on one occasion.

After leaving Sunset Boulevard, Normington appeared in a regional production of Aspects of Love in Hampshire in 1996, playing Rose Vibert, and then played the Baker's Wife in Into the Woods in Leicester in 1997.

In 1998, Normington returned to the West End as Grace Farrell in the revival of Annie at the Victoria Palace, continuing to play the role after the show went on tour in February 1999. She toured with the show for over a year until it ended in Oxford in 2000, after which she returned to South Africa.

==== Return to South Africa ====
She appeared as Miss Bell in Fame in 2002, and as "Soapstar" in Hazel Feldman and Pieter Toerien's production of Menopause - The Musical in 2004. This was followed by a trio of award-winning performances, as Normington received a Naledi Award for her 2006 one-woman show Bombshells, her 2007 performance as Velma von Tussle in the Lyric Theatre production of Hairspray - also starring Mara Louw and Harry Sideropolous - and for her 2010 appearance as Tanya in Mamma Mia!. She also starred as Miss Darbus in the highly publicized production of High School Musical on Stage in 2008, which produced a star in Carmen Pretorius after a televised talent search program: High School Musical: Spotlight South Africa.

The 2010s saw a series of smaller shows to go along with her customary large production musicals, as Normington performed in Nora Ephron's Love, Loss, and What I Wore in 2011, and appeared in Two in the Bush, a comedy sketch show she wrote and co-devised with Jaci de Villiers, at the Auto & General Theatre on the Square in 2014. Normington also starred in the Market Theatre's production of Pirandello's Six Characters In Search of an Author in 2015.

Normington did not, however, take a break from big budget musicals in this time, starring as Fraulein Kost in 2012's Cabaret, Mother Superior in the Nelson Mandela Theatre's Sister Act in 2015, Mrs Brice in the Fugard Theatre's 2017 production of Funny Girl, as well as Mrs White in Marc Lottering's Aunty Merle: The Musical, and Liz Essendine in Present Laughter at the Theatre on the Bay. 2016 also saw Normington appear in her first pantomime at the Nelson Mandela Theatre, playing Aunt Silly in Janice Honeyman's Babes in the Woods.

More recently, Normington has had several star turns, as Mrs Shears and various other characters in The Curious Incident Of The Dog In the Night Time in 2018, as The Witch in PTP's Into the Woods in Cape Town and Johannesburg in 2019 (a role for which she was nominated for both Fleur du Cap and Naledi Awards), and as the Narrator in The Rocky Horror Show in 2020. In 2023 she plays Rachel Swart (and numerous other characters) in the stage adaption of Damon Galgut's The Promise in Cape Town and Johannesburg.

=== Film and television ===
Normington has appeared in several films over the course of her career, starting with 1991's The Sheltering Desert, in which she appeared alongside Gavin Hood and Rupert Graves, which was followed by Brendan Pollecutt's Hey Boy in 2003. She also appeared in a short from the NFVN, entitled The Last Doorman, as well as starring in Angus Buchan's Ordinary People in 2006. More recently, Normington appeared in the Netflix film The Last Days of American Crime, starring Edgar Ramirez.

Normington has also had a long and varied television career, appearing in many popular South African programs, such as Scandal, Shado's, Hard Copy, 7de Laan, The Lab, Backstage, and The Res. She received a SAFTA nomination for her work on Tim Greene's Those Who Can't in 2017, and played Pam Henshaw in SABC 3's High Rollers. Also in 2017, she gained critical acclaim for her appearance in Julia Anastosopoulos's Tali's Wedding Diary, as Michelle, the title character's mother. Normington also appeared in three episodes of MNet's Still Breathing alongside Siv Ngesi, Michael Richard, and Dorothy Ann Gould.

=== Music ===
Normington has also released two solo albums, Mother's Daughter - for which she wrote six original tracks - and a recording of Tell Me On a Sunday, the first act of Andrew Lloyd Webber's Song and Dance.

== Theatre ==
Year	Production	Role	Venue	Notes
1986	Tarts		La Parisienne	
1987	Nunsense	Sister Mary Amnesia	Alhambra Theatre/Theatre on the Bay	Fleur du Cap Award
1987	Sweeney Todd: the Demon Barber of Fleet Street	Joanna	Durban Playhouse	
1987	Sweet Charity	Niki	Durban Playhouse	
1987	Candide	Ensemble	Durban Playouse	
1989	Camelot	Guinevere	State Theatre	
1990	My Fair Lady	Eliza	State Theatre	Vita Award
1991	A Touch of Webber... A Taste of Rice			
1992	Romance Romance	Josephine	Natal Playhouse	
1993	The Rocky Horror Show	Janet	The Victory Theatre	
1993	Grease	Sandy	Baxter Theatre	
1993	Sunset Boulevard	Ensemble/Betty Schaefer Understudy	Adelphi Theatre	West End
1994	Hair	Sheila	Civic Theatre	
1995	Crazy For You	Irene	State Theatre	
1995	Tell Me On a Sunday	Emma	The Sound Stage	
1995	Sunset Boulevard	Company/Norma Desmond Understudy	Adelphi Theatre	West End
1996	Aspects of Love	Rose Vibert	The Haymarket Theatre - Hampshire	
1996	Into the Woods	The Baker's Wife	The Haymarket Theatre - Leicester	
1999	Annie	Grace Farrell	Victoria Palace Theatre	West End
2002	Fame	Miss Bell	Civic Theatre	
2004	Blithe Spirit	Mrs Bradman		
2004	Menopause The Musical	Soap Star	Theatre on the Bay	
2004	King Lear	Goneril	Tesson Theatre	
2004	The Shadrack Affair	Barbara	Baxter Theatre	
2006	Bombshells			Naledi Award
2007	Hairspray	Velma von Tussel	Lyric Theatre	Naledi Award
2008	High School Musical on Stage	Miss Darbus	Montecasino Teatro	
2010	Mamma Mia!	Tanya	Artscape Theatre Centre/Montecasino Teatro	Naledi Award
2011	Love, Loss, and What I Wore		Theatre on the Bay	
2011	Ester	Queen Vashti	State Theatre	
2012	Cabaret	Fraulein Kost	Pieter Toerien Theatre/Theatre on the Bay	Fleur du Cap Nomination
2013	Dirty Dancing	Marjorie Houseman	Artscape Theatre Centre	
2014	Two in the Bush		Auto & General Theatre on the Square	Also created and wrote
2015	Sister Act	Mother Superior	Joburg Theatre	Naledi Award nomination
2015	Six Characters In Search of an Author	Lead Actress	Market Theatre	
2016	Robin Hood and the Babes in the Wood	Silly Sylviana	Joburg Theatre	Naledi Award nomination
2017	Funny Girl	Mrs Brice	Fugard Theatre	Fleur du Cap Nomination
2018	The Curious Incident of the Dog in the Night Time	Mrs Shears	Pieter Toerien Theatre/Theatre on the Bay	
2019	Into the Woods	The Witch	Pieter Toerien Theatre/Theatre on the Bay	Fleur du Cap and Naledi Award nominations
2020	The Rocky Horror Show	The Narrator	Montecasino Teatro	
2023	The Promise	Rachel Swart	District Six Homecoming Centre, Cape Town; Market Theatre, Johannesburg	
2026	A Little Night Music	Countess Charlotte Malcolm	Theatre on the Bay	

== Filmography ==
=== Film ===
Year	Title	Role	Notes
1991	The Sheltering Desert	Brigitte Muller	
1991	Hot Pursuit	Samantha Jubost	
2003	Hey Boy	Leslie	
2008	Coronation Street: Out of Africa	Pamela Teal	
2009	Diamonds	Denmont Lawyer	TV movie
2012	Angus Buchan's Ordinary People	Eileen Cloete	
2014	The Last Doorman	Marlene Krause	NFVF Short
2018	Three Way Junction	Fran	
2020	The Last Days of American Crime	News Anchor	

=== Television ===
Year	Title	Role	Notes
2005	Hard Copy	Julia	
2006	Shado's	Savannah	
2006	The Lab	Christa	
2007	Jacob's Cross	Ms Klausen	
2008	On the Couch	Lizzie	
2009	Society	Society	
2012-2015	Those Who Can't	Desiree Young	
2013	Loitering in Jozi	Guest	
2016	High Rollers	Pam	
2016	Sober Companion	Tina's Mother	
2017	Taryn & Sharon	Leanne Maddox	
2017	Tali's Wedding Diary	Michelle	
2020	Still Breathing	Liza	
	Scandal		
	The Res	Shirl	
	Backstage	Bobby's Mom	
	7de Laan		

== Discography ==
- Mother's Daughter (2001)
- Tell Me On a Sunday (1994)

== Awards and nominations ==
=== Theatre ===
Year	Award	Category	Nominated work	Result
1988	Fleur du Cap Award	Best Supporting Actress in a Musical	Nunsense	Won
1988	Vita	Award for Comedy	Nunsense	Won
1992	Vita	Best Lead Actress	My Fair Lady	Nominated
2006	Naledi Theatre Awards	Best Actress	Bombshells	Won
2007	Naledi Theatre Awards	Best Supporting Actress in a Musical	Hairspray	Won
2010	Naledi Theatre Awards	Best Supporting Actress in a Musical	Mamma Mia!	Won
2012	Fleur du Cap Award	Best Supporting Actress in a Musical	Cabaret	Nominated
2015	Naledi Theatre Awards	Best Supporting Actress in a Musical	Sister Act	Nominated
2016	Naledi Theatre Awards	Best Supporting Actress in a Musical	Robin Hood and the Babes in the Wood	Nominated
2017	Fleur du Cap Award	Best Supporting Actress in a Musical	Funny Girl	Nominated
2020	Naledi Theatre Awards	Best Actress in a Musical	Into the Woods	Pending
2020	Fleur du Cap Award	Best Actress in a Musical	Into the Woods	Pending
2020	Fleur du Cap Award	Best Supporting Actress in a Musical	The Rocky Horror Show	Pending

=== Television ===
Year	Award	Category	Nominated work	Result
2017	SAFTA	Best Supporting Actress: Comedy	Those Who Can't	Nominated
