= Angus Buchan's Ordinary People =

- Directed by: FC Hamman
- Written by: FC Hamman; Piet Smit
- Produced by: Andre Scholtz; Jarrod de Jong; FC Hamman; Peter Scott
- Starring: Anton Dekker; Jaco Muller; Lucky Koza; David James; Anrich Herbst; Angus Buchan
- Cinematography: Rory O'Grady
- Music by: Mauritz Lotz; Michael W. Smith
- Production companies: FC Hamman Films; Spotlight Entertainment
- Distributed by: Ster-Kinekor Distribution
- Release date: 5 April 2012 (South Africa)
- Running time: 115 minutes
- Country: South Africa
- Languages: English; Afrikaans

Angus Buchan's Ordinary People is a 2012 South African drama film that tells the story of South African preacher Angus Buchan and the intertwining stories of three men en route to one of Buchan's Mighty Men's Conferences. It is not a sequel to the film Faith Like Potatoes, also based on the life story of Angus Buchan. The film was directed by FC Hamman and stars Anton Dekker, Jaco Muller, Lucky Koza, David James, Kate Normington, Robin Smith and Norman Anstey. Buchan makes a brief appearance as himself.

== Plot ==
The film opens with Angus Buchan's story as he realizes from the time he is a teen that he wants to be a preacher, and is discouraged when his minister tells him about the years of schooling he must complete. He goes on to acquire a farm and eventually marry, and while he works hard to make a success of his land, he never abandons his dream. He begins by preaching to the maize in his field from the back of his truck, and this grows into his audience of thousands at his Mighty Men's Conferences.

The story then shifts to three interwoven stories, based on real characters and real events.

Lucky Nzimande (Lucky Koza) is a career criminal who unwittingly attempts to hijack what turns out to be two policemen on their way to the Mighty Men's Conference. After his gun fails to fire on Lucky, one of the policemen takes this as a sign from God that he is meant to take the man to the Conference with them. They handcuff Lucky in the back and ask him about his story; he talks about never knowing his father and his mother dying when he was 8. He started stealing early on to help provide for his siblings and grandmother, who died when he was 13. Lucky escapes from the policemen and is assaulted that night, suffering a gash on his head. The next day the men see him and kindly offer to tend to his wound and give him a ride home. Afterwards he agrees to go to the Conference with them.

André Cloete (Jaco Muller) is an alcoholic young adult who is self-destructing quickly due in part to his emotionally absent but strictly religious father. His mother covers for him when he crashes his car into a neighbor's gate, begging her not to call the police. After another severe accident his father prays over him and realizes he is too harsh, but Andre continues to drink and party after getting out of the hospital. He then finally agrees to attend the Conference with his father and brother.

John Peters (Anton Dekker) is a middle-aged panel beater and biker with two sons. He marries a woman named Marlene and she and her two girls move in with them. Marlene's brother-in-law Danny (David James) asks John for a business loan; John doesn't have the money but agrees to stand surety if Danny applies for a bank loan. John's youngest son then dies in a motorcycle accident, Danny defaults on the loan and John is diagnosed with a chronic lung condition. Sensing he is taking his anger out on his oldest son, Marlene encourages him to attend the Conference. John reconciles with Danny and apologizes to his son before he goes.

The men all make their way to a Mighty Men's Conference where they listen to Buchan's preaching, which includes his recounting of the two heart attacks he suffered the year before.

After the Conference, Lucky returns to his impoverished hometown and begins passing out religious flyers. Andre calls a friend and tells him that he's given his life to the Lord. John suffers an accident on the way home and dies. After his funeral, Danny is seen off to himself, crying and praying.

The film ends with titles revealing that Lucky continues to preach, Andre does volunteer work, and John's oldest son Gavin took over his business and continues to care for Marlene and her girls.

== Cast ==
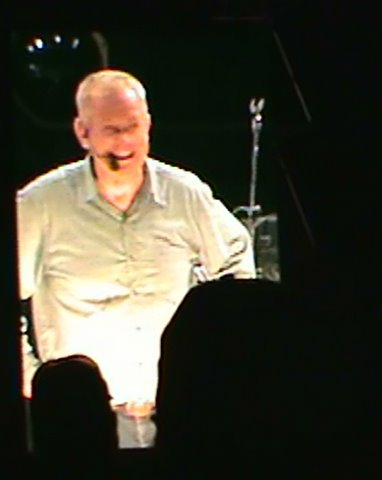
Noted South African preacher Angus Buchan appears as himself in the film.

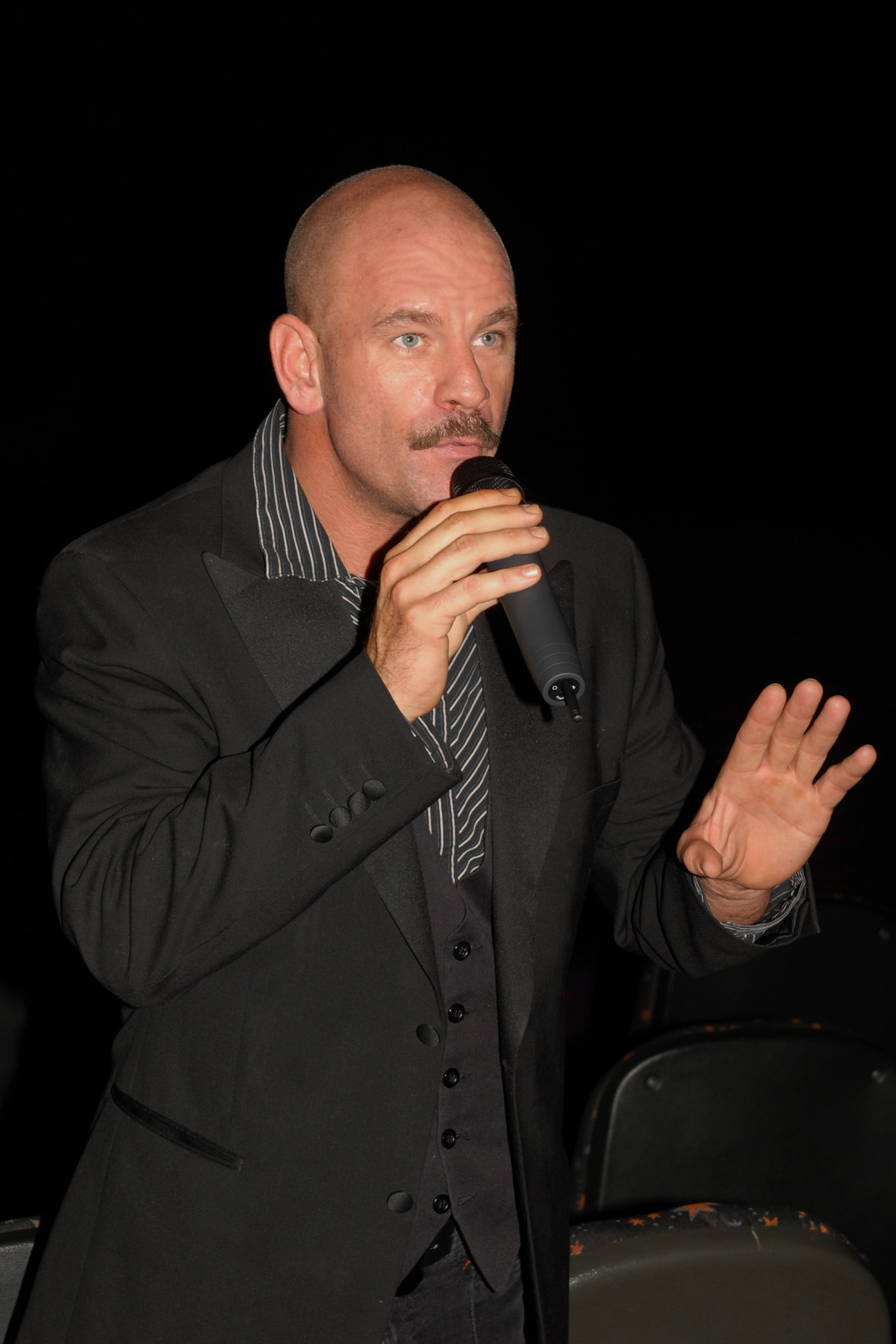
Veteran South African actor David James appears as Danny Boy.

- Anton Dekker as John Peters.
- Jaco Muller as Andre Cloete.
- Lucky Koza as Lucky Nzimande.
- David James as Danny Boy.
- Anrich Herbst as young Angus Buchan.
- Angus Buchan as himself.
- Norman Antsey as James Cloete.
- Kate Normington as Ellen Cloete.
- Robin Smith as Herman Visser.
- Hannes Muller as Ben Wolhuter.
- Charles Bouguenon as Xavier.
- Michelle Douglas as Marlene.
- Simeon Hamman as Juan.
- Steve Larter as Terrence.
- Kaz McFadden as Jake Cloete.

== Production ==
The movie was produced by Andre Scholtz, Jarrod de Jong, FC Hamman and Peter Scott; it was directed by FC Hamman. It is distributed by Ster-Kinekor Distribution in South Africa.

Filming took place in Johannesburg, Cape Town, Limpopo and Greytown, and the film includes live footage of one of Buchan's Mighty Men's Conferences as held on his Shalom Farms. It also employed hundreds of extras for scenes of Buchan's preaching.

=== Direction ===
According to Buchan, director FC Hamman, who had directed the official documentary for the World Cup in South Africa, approached him after a Mighty Men's Conference in 2010. "He told me he wanted to do something for God ... He said he wanted to make a movie about what happened to men at the conference."

=== Score ===
The original score was provided by South African composer and musician Mauritz Lotz, and music by international Christian recording artist Michael W. Smith.

== Reception ==
The film received positive to mixed reviews from critics. Tina George of IOL Tonight gave it 4 stars out of 5, stating, "Director Hamman does a superb job in captivating the audience with these real-life scenarios." Philip Altebeker of Business Day stated, "Ordinary People is filled with motor accidents and Hamman’s overuse of this device — literally, a deus ex machine — detracts from the intended message which, to his credit, is otherwise treated discreetly if not completely convincingly despite having its heart in the right place." According to Screen Africa, the movie opened at the number six spot in the local box office.

== See also ==
Faith Like Potatoes
Mighty Men's Conference
