= Theatre on the Bay =

Theatre in Camps Bay

Coordinates: 33.9550°S 18.3771°E

Theatre on the Bay is a theatre in Camps Bay, Cape Town, South Africa. Pieter Toerien converted the building into a theatre in the 1980s. It opened in December 1988 with a production of Dan Goggin's Nunsense.

Toerien's theatre hosts a mix of local and international drama, concerts, comedies, and dance.
