= Alhambra Theatre (Johannesburg) =

Theatre in Johannesburg, South Africa

Coordinates: 26.1945491°S 28.0584628°E

The Alhambra Theatre is a theatre that opened in 1977 in Doornfontein, Johannesburg, South Africa.

== History ==
A cinema in Doornfontein was restored in 1977 and converted into a live performance space for musical theatre by the Johannesburg Operatic and Dramatic Society. On17 April of that year, it opened with A Night to Remember, directed by Anthony Farmer.

Pieter Toerien bought the theatre around 1981 and staged Peter Shaffer's Amadeus here. Other Toerien productions presented at the Alhambra include Agatha Christie's The Unexpected Guest (1982), John Chapman and Dave Freeman's Key for Two, A. R. Gurney's The Dining Room, and Dan Goggin's Nunsense under the direction of Tobie Cronjé (1988).

In 1983, Toerien opened a new auditorium, the Leonard Rayne Theare, here. In 1991, he renovated the Alhambra and added a third auditorium, the Richard Haines Theatre. The restored theatre opened that year on 27 September 1991 with three productions, A Slice of Saturday Night, Love Letters, and Never the Sinner.
