= The Paul Mirfin Band =

Folk rock band

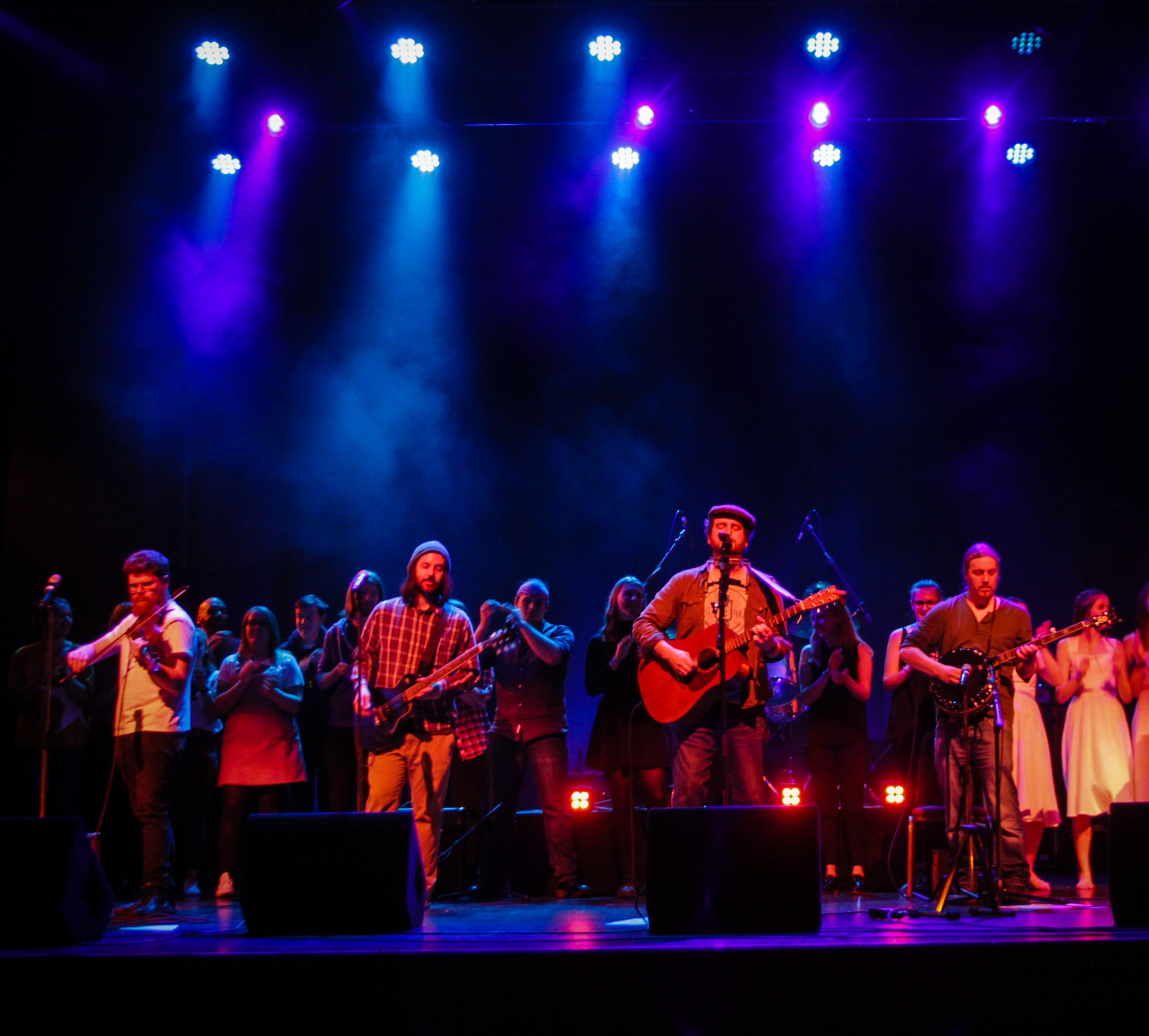
- The Paul Mirfin Band performing in 2018

Background information
- Origin: Knaresborough, North Yorkshire, England
- Genres: Folk rock; gospel; Americana
- Years active: 2015–present
- Members: Paul Mirfin; Ben Mirfin; Warren Timmis; Mark Boyle; John Evamy
- Past members: Dom Cottrill; Dan Jackman
- Website: Official website

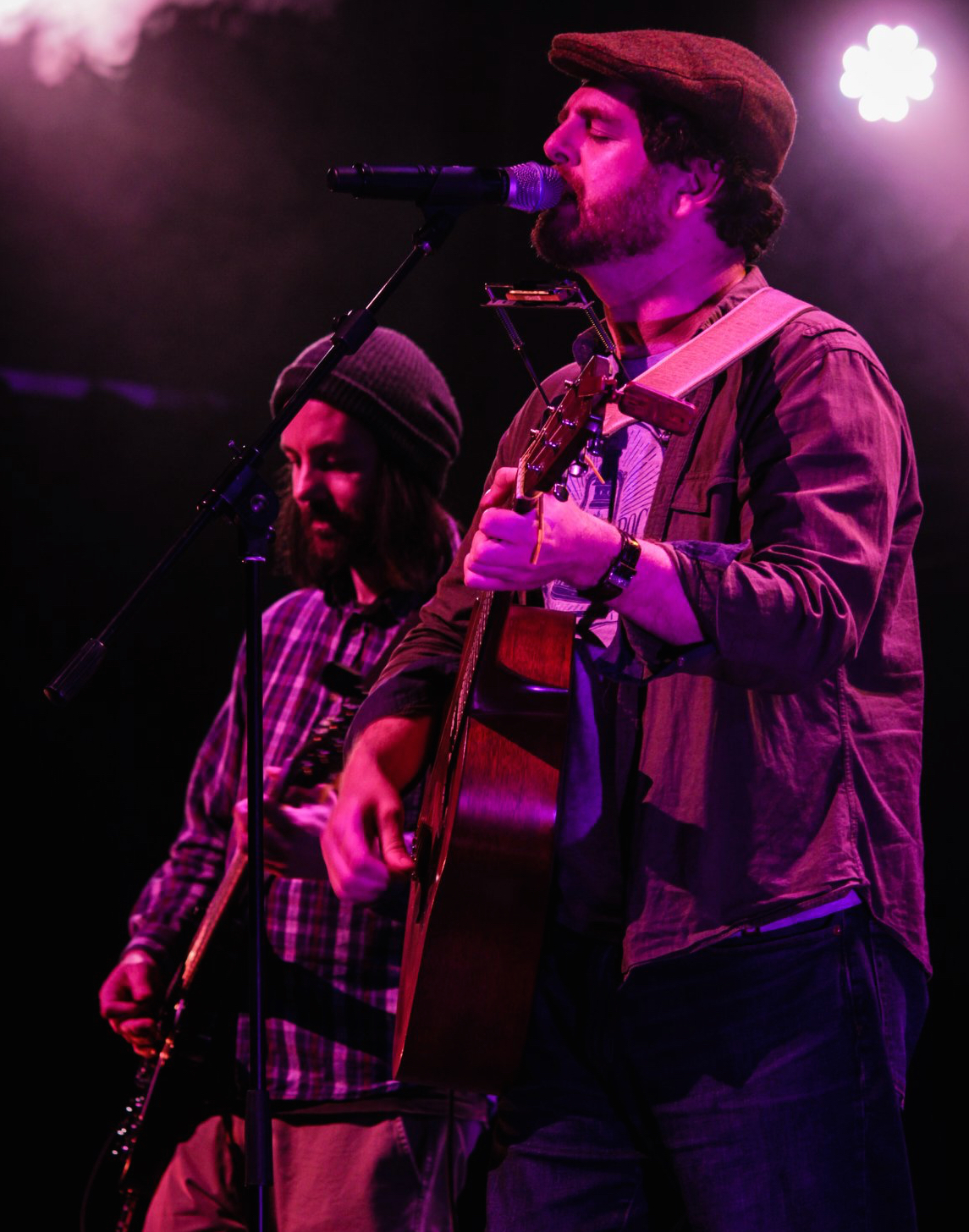
Warren Timmis & Paul Mirfin performing at Harrogate Royal Hall 2018

The Paul Mirfin Band are a folk rock band from Knaresborough, North Yorkshire that formed in May 2015. The founding member was Paul Mirfin (lead vocals, guitar, merlin, harmonica) who, whilst working as a train conductor on Northern Rail, began writing and performing songs at music events that he organised at the local Caffe Nero branch in Harrogate. The original band came together after Mirfin put a call out at his local church to recruit musicians. During the first few months of forming there was a speedy acceleration in the popularity of the band as they played in pubs, cafes, churches and at country music festivals. The trio's unique acoustic sound with a range of instruments from Merlin to Irish Bouzouki set alongside rich three part harmonies influenced by violinist Dan Jackman's classical music training set them apart from other bands on the gig circuit. Drawing from influences such as Del Amitri, David Crowder, Johnny Cash and Mumford & Sons they were strong on melodies and story-telling lyrics.

After an appearance on BBC Songs of Praise in June 2016, where Mirfin was featured as Yorkshire's Singing Train Conductor by presenter Diane-Louise Jordan, the band began to gain momentum releasing their first EP 'Bring the Rain' in the same month and playing to sell out venues in the Yorkshire area. Recorded in one day at a small local studio called Homefire, this live studio recording provided a springboard onto the international music scene.

== History ==
=== 2015-2017 ===
Paul Mirfin had been playing on the pub gig scene in Harrogate for five years, playing solo and with folk groups such as Echo the Woods. In 2015 he began writing his own songs and contacted the church he attended to recruit musicians to form the first Paul Mirfin Band line up. Dom Cottrill (cajon, drums, vocals) and Daniel Jackman (violin, vocals) joined Mirfin in March 2015 and by October the group had a 60-minute set of original songs by Mirfin as well as covers of country and gospel classics including Come to the River by Rhett Walker, This I Know by David Crowder and I Saw the Light by Hank Williams. The three had very different musical backgrounds and their sound was informed by Cottrill's rock drumming experience, Jackman's classical music training and Mirfin's previous involvement in the country and folk scene. The band gigged on railway platforms across the north of England as Mirfin continued his career with Northern Rail resulting in the local press naming him 'The Singing Train Conductor'. The trio also played at a series of events in local cafes called 'The Oaks'. These twilight gigs were born out of an idea by Mirfin to make live music accessible to families outside of a pub environment. At one of these events BBC journalist Rachel Williams spotted the band and put them forward for a special railway themed episode of Songs of Praise also featuring R&B and soul singer Ruby Turner and classical singer Katherine Jenkins. Shortly after this in May 2016 the band released their first EP 'Bring the Rain' recorded live at Homefire Studios Harrogate on an independent label. The songs on this EP were inspired by collisions in life and relationships following a turbulent few years in Mirfin's life. Underlying themes in many of the songs are those of love and hope, influenced by testimonies of Mirfin's Christian faith. The EP was followed by a single released in November 2017 called 'The Fighter' "with its memorable Trinitarian lines, "Well, there's one of you/And there's three of me/Come on and fight."

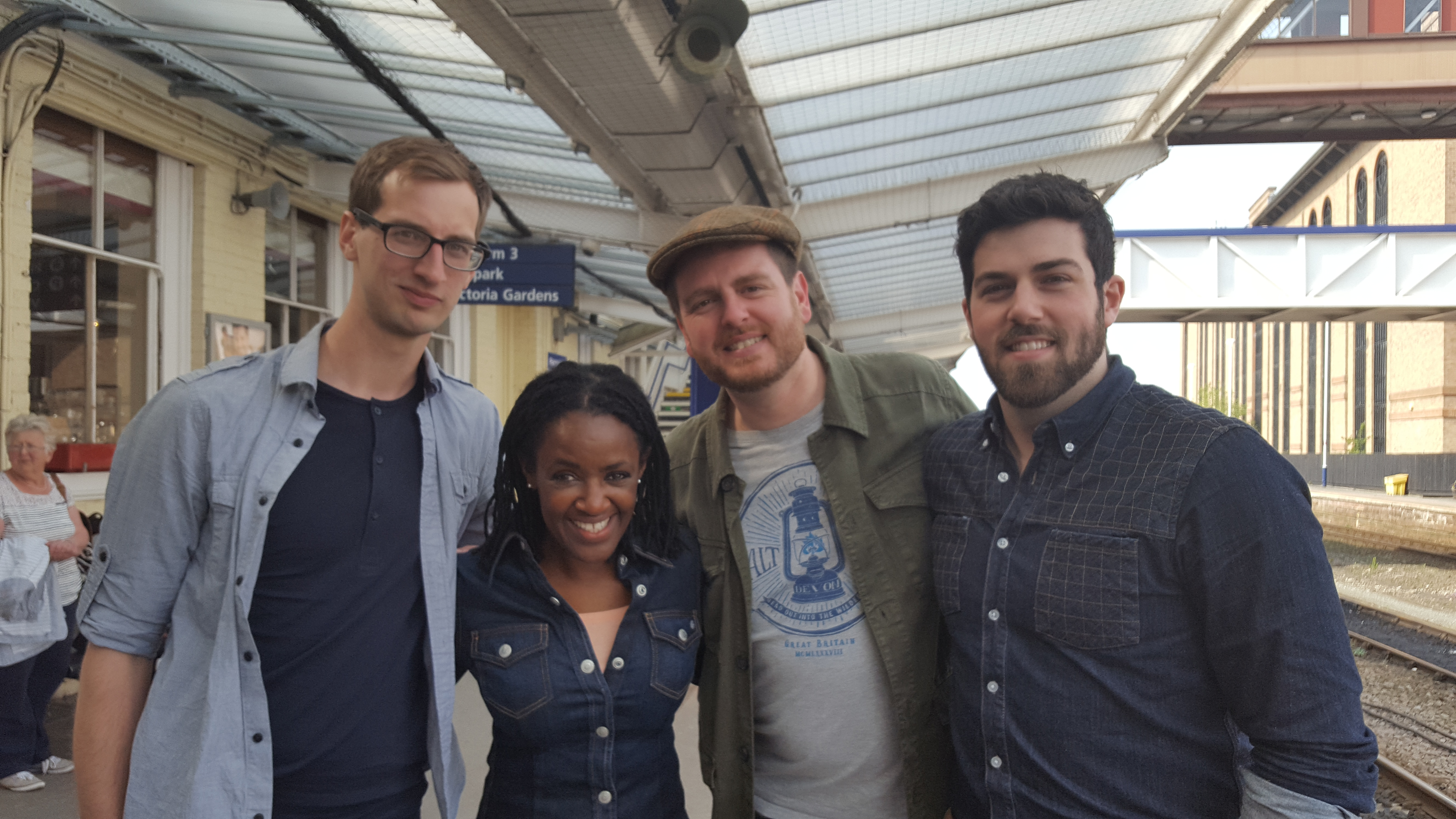
Dan Jackman, Diane-Louise Jordan, Paul Mirfin, Dom Cottrill at Harrogate Railway Station during filming for BBC1 Songs of Praise, May 2016

As the band gained in popularity gigs became more frequent with appearances at the Pateley Bridge Mighty Men Conference with Angus Buchan, the Bettys and Taylors Woodland Festival, The Knaresborough Bed Race, 'The Oaks' Live Music at Caffe Nero and an invitation from Angus Buchan to the Sacred Assembly event in Johannesburg. In December 2016, Cottrill and Jackman decided they needed to step down as full-time band members to focus on family life, which led to a short transitional period for The Paul Mirfin Band while a new line up formed and new songs were written and rehearsed. They returned for a brief period in 2017 for the filming of 'The Fighter' music video, which later won Best Rock Video 2017 at the JUMP music awards. The video, shot around Thirsk, North Yorkshire, was directed by Dave Thorp and featured actor Velton Lishke along with Mirfin as two men in conflict; Mirfin's character defeats 'The Fighter' (played by Lishke) in an underground bare knuckle fight scene without actually throwing a punch.

=== 2017-present ===
Following the success of 'The Fighter', media interest in the band and in Mirfin's testimony heightened, particularly amongst Christian broadcasting companies. In March 2017 the new band line up made their first appearance on TBN UK with presenter Leon Schoeman on TBN Meets. The new line up included Warren Timmis, an accomplished lead guitarist with a BA (Hons) in Contemporary Music and influences such as Mahavishnu Orchestra, Old Crow Medicine Show and Slash; Mark Boyle (banjo, shruti) brought country music influences from the likes of Chet Atkins and Merle Travis and John Evamy (violin) whose classical background in music and compositional studies at University of York where he completed a BA (Hons) brought new depth to the string arrangements. Paul's brother, Ben Mirfin (drums), who had previously played in church worship bands, completed the new line up before their next major appearance at Creation Fest, Cornwall in August 2017. This coincided with the release of a cover version of 'This Train is Bound for Glory' with accompanying music video shot on Embsay and Bolton Abbey Steam Railway. They also embarked on their first tour of church venues in Liverpool, Darlington, Sheffield and Wetherby.

In January 2018 it was announced that the band were returning to Homefire Studios in Harrogate to record their first full-length album 'Ancient Roads'. The full costs of the album were funded through a successful Pledge Music Campaign. In his review of the album Tony Cummings from Cross Rhythms Radio wrote: "In the '60s it was Parchment and Gordon Giltrap-era Graham Kendrick. In the '90s it was Eden Burning and the Pink Dandelions. And today a new band, led by singer, guitarist and songwriter Paul Mirfin from Knaresborough, have emerged onto the scene easily as good as those units of yesteryear.......the delicate acoustic-driven "Trust In The Silence" which is as haunting an intimate worship song as you're likely to hear this year. Remember the name. You'll be hearing a lot more of these Yorkshire men's slant on American country porch music in the years ahead."

2018 also saw the band performing at large scale festivals in the UK and USA - Spring Harvest and True North at Harrogate Royal Hall, North Yorkshire and Joshua Fest, Quincy, California.

== Discography ==
- Bring the Rain (EP) 2016
- The Fighter (single) 2016
- This Train is Bound For Glory (single) 2017
- Ancient Roads (album) 2018
