= Messum River =

Coordinates: 55°17′16″N 38°43′10″E

- ISS image of the Messum Crater, 2026. The river cuts the northern igneous ring of the crater.

Physical characteristics
- Source: Brandberg Mountain
  - location: Dâures Constituency, Erongo Region
- Mouth: Atlantic Ocean
  - coordinates
  - elevation: 0 m (0 ft)

The Messum River is an ephemeral river in Namibia's Erongo Region. Its source is in the Brandberg Mountain. It flows southwest, crossing the Goboboseb Mountains and touching the periphery of the Messum Crater which was named after the river. The shape of the riverbed and the mountains suggests that the river is older. From there, the Messum flows west to the Atlantic Ocean where it reaches the coast just north of Mile 108.
