= Eternity (2010 South African film) =

- Directed by: David Borla (uncredited), Chris dos Santos (credited as Allan Smithee)
- Written by: Anton Ernst; Wolfgang Muller
- Produced by: Anton Ernst
- Starring: Hlomla Dandala; David James; Ian Roberts; Andre Frauenstein; Christina Storm
- Cinematography: Christopher Grant Harvey
- Edited by: Christopher-Lee Dos Santos; Christopher Grant Harvey
- Music by: Anton L'Amour
- Production company: Makadi Ventures
- Distributed by: Indigenous Film Distribution
- Release date: 24 December 2010
- Country: South Africa
- Language: English

Eternity is a South African horror film which tells the story of a clash between vampires over the use of a serum that would allow them to walk in the daylight. Written by Anton Ernst and Wolfgang Muller, and stars Hlomla Dandala, Ian Roberts, David James, and Andre Frauenstein.

== Plot ==
The film begins with a scientist, Tevis Shapiro (Ian Roberts), working on a treatment for HIV/AIDS using vampires as test subjects who, in the process, accidentally discovers a serum that would allow vampires to exist in the daylight. This causes a clash between vampire clans; those who would resist its use in favor of tradition and those who are eager to use the serum for freedom to live in the light and to permanently defeat humans, most specifically vicious vampire Borlak (David James).

When Shapiro goes missing, Borlak kills the man's wife and threatens his daughter Jenny (Rikki Brest), who is rescued by her new love, young vampire Billy (Andre Frauenstein) whom she has coincidentally just met in a local nightclub. Borlak is then joined by Billy's ex-girlfriend Lisa (Christina Storm) who is hoping to sabotage Billy's new relationship. Billy joins forces with police officer and vampire hunter Joe Kau (Hlomla Dandala) to defeat Borlak and destroy the serum, but not before Jenny is killed during their final confrontation. In the end, Billy allows Kau to kill him as well in order to reunite with his lost love.

== Cast ==
- Hlomla Dandala as Joe Kau: A police detective with a belief in vampires that is dismissed and ridiculed by his peers.
- David James as Borlak: A violent, rebellious and ambitious vampire that wants to "claim the rights of the Johannesburg clans" and walk in the daylight so as to defeat humans.
- Andre Frauenstein as Billy: A "handsome, sensitive" young vampire that expresses loneliness while still enjoying the nightlife of Johannesburg, and who finally finds true love in human girl Jenny.
- Christina Storm as Lisa: Billy's ex-girlfriend that tries to restart their relationship, and who then subsequently joins forces with Borlak in order to sabotage Billy's new love.
- Ian Roberts as Tevis Shapiro: A doctor researching a treatment for HIV/AIDS who creates a serum that would allow vampires to walk in the daylight.
- Rikki Brest as Jenny: The daughter of Doctor Shapiro.

== Production and distribution ==
The film was distributed by Indigenous Film Distribution to theaters in South Africa on 30 December 2010 and was released to DVD in February 2011.

=== Direction ===
Eternity fell into dire straits when the original director for the film, David Borla, left the project during the first week of principal photography due to creative differences with producer Anton Ernst, who stopped production so an extensive rewrite could take place with writer Wolfgang Muller. Two other directors were brought into the production before Ernst finally hired director Chris dos Santos, who is rumored to only have had 12 days to prepare for taking on the film, which had already begun shooting. Dos Santos oversaw completion of the film in July 2010 but elected to be credited as Allan Smithee on the production due to "having his hands tied" and there being "too many chefs in the kitchen".

=== Casting ===
Eternity was the first feature film for both Andre Frauenstein and Rikki Brest. Frauenstein had previously worked as a deejay in various nightclubs in Johannesburg, and Brest continues to perform as a drummer for the all-female band Chix With Stix. Frauenstein stated that he slept during the day and did not see the sun for three months in order to prepare for the role.

Nightclub owner Lolly Jackson was scheduled to appear in the movie but his scene was cut from the film after he was murdered on 4 May 2010.

=== Filming ===
The majority of the filming took place in May and June 2009, in the inner city of Soweto and in an abandoned power plant. The movie incorporated the use of parkour throughout.

== Reception ==
Upon release, the movie was immediately berated by critics and audiences alike. Munyaradzi Vomo of IOL referred to it as being "trapped in a year-long eclipse."
