= Dan Goggin =

Dan Goggin may refer to:

- Dan Goggin (composer)
- Dan Goggin (rugby union)
