= David James (actor, born 1972) =

South African actor (born 1972)

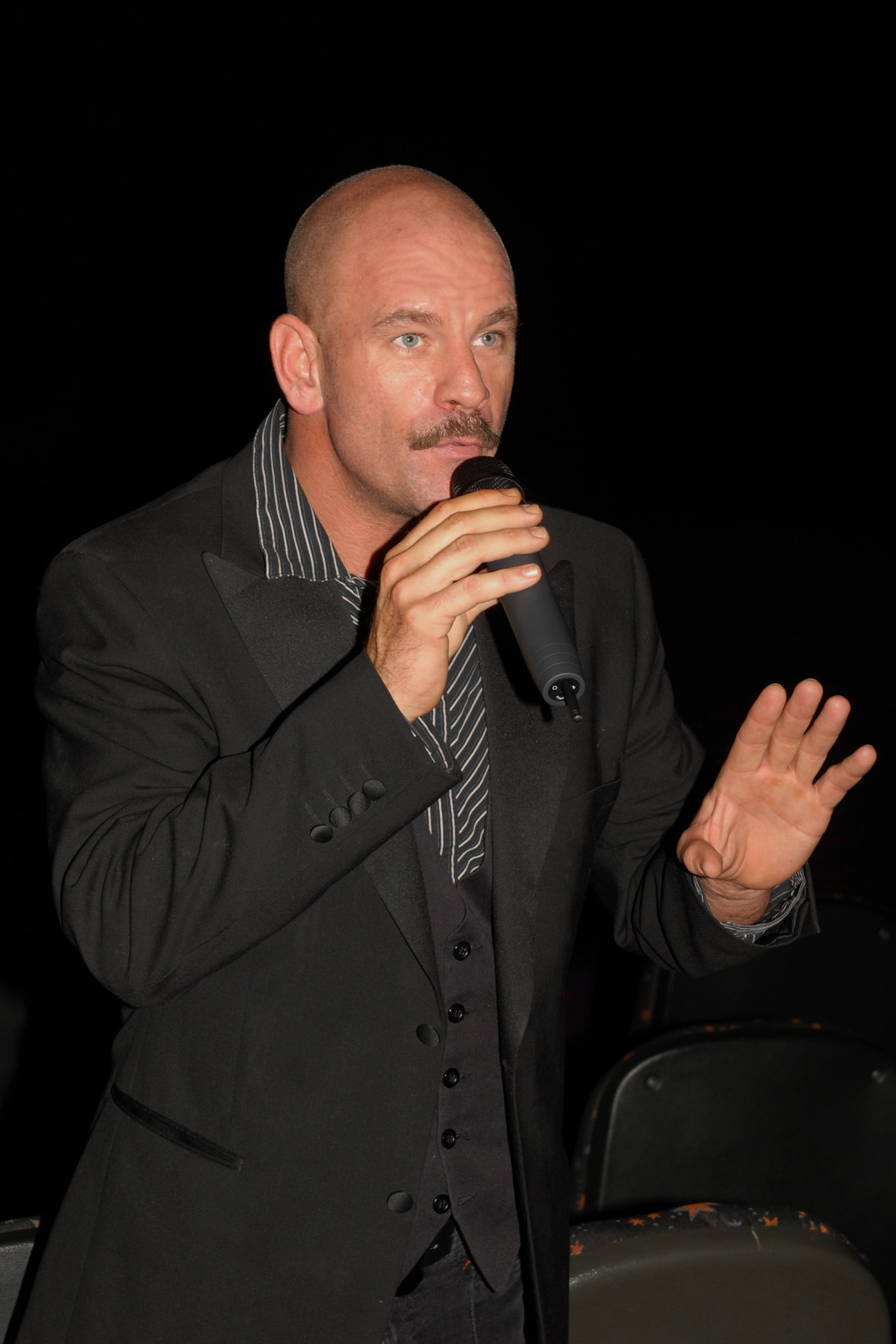
- James at the November 2009 screening of The Ultimate Gift for South African charity Faces of Hope
- Born: 28 October 1972 (age 53); South Africa
- Occupation: Actor
- Years active: 2001–present

David James (born 28 October 1972) is a South African film, theatre and television actor known mainly for playing the villainous Koobus Venter in the Oscar-nominated science fiction film District 9 (2009). He is also known to South African audiences for his 2004–2006 appearance as "Mad Dog" on the long-running soap opera Isidingo, for his portrayal as Joel Joffe in the 2010 and 2011 stage productions of Rivonia Trial, and for his role as radio station manager Hermanus Meyer on the soap opera Rhythm City (2012–2013).

== Early life ==
James grew up in Paarl, Western Cape on a wine farm. His family were conservatives and separatists, his father a Dutch Reformed man, whereas James was liberal. He and his family also clashed early on regarding his choice of careers. As a young man, James struck a bargain with his family that if he were to receive his WP-colours in sports, he could then pursue his choice of studies. After accomplishing this and after his tour of duty in the military, he chose to study acting.

From 1995 to 2001, James studied acting, singing, dancing, and the flute. One of his instructors was the famous Joan Brickhill, a "grand dame" of South African theatre and a Tony Award-nominated choreographer, under whom James studied from 1997 through 2001. During this time he also worked selling and washing cars, cleaning pools, and caring for the elderly.

== Career ==
=== Early work ===
On stage he has costarred in productions of The Picture of Dorian Gray (2002), A Midsummer Night's Dream (2005) and My Fair Lady (2006), and others, as well as Fangs in 2007, a comedic telling of a Johannesburg vampire that loses his fangs. He also costarred in Everybody Else (is Fucking Perfect), a 2007 comedy about a married couple forced to face the husband's sexuality and infidelity.

James has appeared in numerous commercials and corporate promotional materials, including ads and promotions for Toys 'R Us, Ford, Compaq, and Cipler Insurance.

He has also guest-starred in many South African television series and soaps, including roles in Criminal Minds (2000), Snitch (2004), Jozi Street (2004), and the long-running Isidingo, where from 2004 to 2006 he portrayed a hired assassin called Mad Dog.

=== District 9 ===
"I think Neill [Blomkamp] liked the psychopathic edge I gave to Koobus in my audition. He can lie so convincingly to everyone around him - he's operating with his own agenda. Whenever I was in doubt about what my character would do in a situation, I went back to that."

— David James, on the making of District 9

Perhaps his best known role to date is that of Koobus Venter, the ruthless colonel that heads up the military arm of the fictional Multi-National United (MNU) in the 2009 film District 9.

Ironically, James was in a spa getting a foot treatment in preparation for a commercial for a German heel product when he received the call that he had gotten the part of the menacing character. Since The Lord of the Rings films were released, it was a personal dream of his to work on a Peter Jackson film; he would jokingly say to his agent after every meeting, "Tell Spielberg I can't work for him since I'm working for Peter Jackson now." He went to his auditions and callbacks without knowing the details of the film. After getting the role, when his agent said that it was a Jackson-produced film, he thought she was joking as well.

To prepare for the role, James took a course of steroids to put on 10 kg (approx. 22 lbs) of muscle. His actual experience in the military made him comfortable with the various weapons and battle sequences, but he did struggle with the amount of profanity expected of him. He interpreted his character as being of British descent, which would give him an air of superiority over the Wikus van de Merwe character, an Afrikaner.

While his was only a supporting role, it did still earn the attention of critics; The Coventry Telegraph (UK) says, "David James is spot on as the merciless Colonel Venter", and Munyaradzi Vomo of IOL would later refer to it as "almost Oscar-worthy material".

=== 2009–2010 ===
James had a recurring role as Francois Botes, a hired gun, in the series Binnelanders in 2009.

In 2010, in the stage play Rivonia Trial, James portrayed Joel Joffe, the attorney who represented Nelson Mandela in the infamous 1963–64 anti-apartheid trials of the same name. The play was generally well-received critically and described by the State Theatre as being a "complete sell-out".

Also in 2010, he portrayed Afrikaner Sergeant Hattingh in a stage production of Biko: Where the Soul Resides, the story of South African martyr Steven Bantu Biko. It is widely believed that Biko died at the hands of Hattingh during police interrogations in 1977. The play itself was not typically well-reviewed; The Times stated, "The talented David James gives a rather cliched portrayal of Afrikaner Sergeant Hattingh. It wouldn't be surprising to learn that the part was perhaps written that way. It's very rare to find a portrayal of a member of the apartheid regime that does not resort to a lacklustre caricature."

Later in 2010, he co-starred in Jock of the Bushveld - the Musical, based on the best-selling book Jock of the Bushveld by James Percy FitzPatrick. In this Lion King-like story of a dog lost in the African bush, James portrayed one of three hungry yet comical vultures waiting for the animal to become dinner. The large-scale play itself was lauded by critics, as were all the performers.

James guest starred in an episode of Wild at Heart, playing Van Heerden, a ranch owner caught poisoning lions feeding on his cattle. He was also featured in an episode of the South African television series Solving It, a true-crime re-enactment drama that airs on the SABC. In this episode he portrayed Jan Gabriel De Wet Kritzinger, who, in 2000, boarded a bus to Mamelodi, shot and killed the bus driver and opened fire on passengers; Kritzinger then fled police and remained in hiding for two years before being caught.

In December, James appeared as vicious vampire Borlak in the South African modern-day vampire film Eternity. As with District 9, James was working with a first-time feature film director, Chris Dos Santos, who was brought onto the film in its late stage of development when the original director left the production after a disagreement with the film's producer, Anton Ernst. Dos Santos said in one interview that he "hadn't had a chance" to talk to James about his character until after filming began. Eternity was lambasted by critics.

=== 2011 ===
In 2011 James played Dieter, one of a gang of ruthless kidnappers, in the British miniseries Kidnap and Ransom, which was produced by and starred actor Trevor Eve. The three-part miniseries about a hostage negotiator (Eve) was filmed entirely in South Africa and received generally positive reviews.

He also had minor roles in Strike Back, another British series that is shown on Cinemax, and Winnie, a film based on the life of Winnie Mandela which starred Jennifer Hudson and Terrence Howard.

In April and May, he reprised his role as Joel Joffe in an encore presentation of Rivonia Trial at the State Theatre in Pretoria. As with its previous showing, the play received generally positive reviews, and would later be nominated for nine Naledi Theatre Awards, including Best Production of a Play, winning three of those awards.

In August 2011, James reunited with director Christopher-lee dos Santos to play the role of Stutze, a German SS officer hunting down the survivors of a Royal Air Force bomber that crash lands in Nazi occupied France. The film, Angel of the Skies, was released in late 2013.

=== 2012 ===
James appears as Hermanus Meyer, a radio station manager, in the South African television series Rhythm City.

He played biker Danny Boy in the feature film Angus Buchan's Ordinary People, the story of South African preacher Angus Buchan, released in April.

In May, he had a role in the two-man, short-lived but well-received play Comrade Babble, a political satire about slain South African businessman Brett Kebble.

He also appeared in the documentary Saving Rhino Phila, playing a poacher in reenactments of poaching in the South African bush. The film was shown at the Encounters Festival South Africa in Johannesburg in June, and won a prestigious Wildscreen Wildlife & Environmental Film Festival Panda award for best film in the Nature Conservancy Environment and Conservation category.

=== 2013 ===
James played a villain called Hermanus Meyer in the TV series Rhythm City for several years.

== Personal life ==
James currently lives in Parkview, a suburb of Johannesburg. He is bilingual, speaking both English and Afrikaans. He has an older sister, Lorraine, who owns and operates a vacation resort property in Paarl.

=== Charity work ===
James has assisted in fundraising for Faces of Hope, a South African charity that raises money for those with life-threatening illnesses that do not have adequate medical coverage or funds to pay for their treatments. In April 2010, an article regarding Faces of Hope and his participation was featured in O: The Oprah Magazine South African edition.

=== Public appearances ===
James appeared as a celebrity judge for the February 2010 young thespians "High Flyer" contest at Redhill School in Johannesburg. Coincidentally, this is the same private school that his District 9 costar Sharlto Copley and director Neill Blomkamp both previously attended. In March 2010, James was a celebrity presenter at the Naledi Theatre Awards.

=== Tshwane University of Technology student work ===
In September 2012, James assisted with first-year student projects at Tshwane University of Technology (TUT). This was his third year of working with the students, who presented a remake of a scene from The Godfather.

== Filmography ==
=== Film ===
Year	Title	Role	Notes
2009	District 9	Koobus Venter	
2010	Eternity	Borlak	
2011	Winnie		
2012	Angus Buchan's Ordinary People	Danny Boy	
2012	Saving Rhino Phila	Poacher Boss	
2013	Chander Pahar	Albuquerque	Bengali
2013	Angel of the Skies	Stutze	
2013	Babalas	Clinic Doctor	
2014	The Salvation	Tracker	
2017	Amazon Obhijaan	Marco Florian	Bengali
2018	Sew the Winter to My Skin	Frontiersman	
2023	Hammarskjöld	Congo Red	
2025	G20	Csonger	

=== Television ===
Year	Title	Role	Notes
2000	Criminal Minds		
2004	Snitch		
2004	Jozi Street		
2005	Isidingo	Tommy "Mad Dog" McCulum	1 episode
2009	Binnelanders	Danie Nel	5 episodes
2010	Wild at Heart	Van Heerden	Episode #5.9
2010	Solving It	Jan Gabriel De Wet Kritzinger	Episode: "The God of Wrath"
2011	Kidnap and Ransom	Dieter Devries	2 episodes
2011	Strike Back	PMC Mercenary	
2012–2013	Rhythm City	Hermanus Meyer	83 episodes
2013	Mad Dogs	Karel	Episode #3.2
2013	Donkerland	Const. Jannie Kruger	Episode: "Die Jaar 1976: Swart Klip – Deel Twee"
2015	Black Sails	Pirate Thug	
2019	Deep State	Morten	2 episodes
2021	Dead Places	Robert	Episode: "The 12-Year Witch"
2021	Reyka	Erasmus	8 episodes
2021–2023	Dam	Franz	10 episodes
2022–2024	Diepe Waters	Coach Frederich	33 episodes
2023	Classified	Farnie Steyn	3 episodes

=== Theatre ===
Year	Title	Role
2002	The Picture of Dorian Gray	
2005	A Midsummer Night's Dream	
2006	My Fair Lady	
2007	Fangs	
2007	Everybody Else (is Fucking Perfect)	
2010	Rivonia Trial	Joel Joffe
2010	Biko: Where the Soul Resides	Sergeant Hattingh
2010	Jock of the Bushveld: the Musical	Boet
2011	Rivonia Trial Encore Presentation	Joel Joffe
2012	Comrade Babble	Brett Kebble
