= James Small (rugby union) =

South African rugby union player (1969–2019)

- Born: 10 February 1969 Cape Town, South Africa
- Died: 10 July 2019 (aged 50) Johannesburg, South Africa
- Height: 1.85 m (6 ft 1 in)
- Weight: 89 kg (196 lb; 14.0 st)
- School: Greenside High School

Rugby union career
- Position: Wing
Senior career
Years	Team	Apps	(Points)
1988–1993	Transvaal	64	(?)
1993–1996	Natal	67	(258)
1997	Western Province	19	(85)
1998–1999	Golden Lions	?	(?)
Super Rugby
Years	Team	Apps	(Points)
1998	Stormers	6	(5)
1999	Cats	?	(?)
International career
Years	Team	Apps	(Points)
1992–1997	South Africa	47	(100)

James Terence Small (10 February 1969 – 10 July 2019) was a South African rugby union winger who played for the Springboks. His international debut was against the All Blacks in 1992 and he made his final appearance against Scotland in 1997. In that final test match, he scored his 20th try, becoming the leading Springbok try scorer, eclipsing Danie Gerber's record. He was also the leading try scorer in the 1996 Super 12 season.

== Early life and education ==
Small was born in Cape Town to a working-class family, and attended Risidale Primary School and Greenside High School in Johannesburg, South Africa. He obtained Transvaal Colours for athletics and competed in the 100m and 400m when he was 16, but looking back said lacked the discipline in school required by athletics, preferring rugby as the fun alternative. He said he was offered the opportunity to go to San Diego State University for athletics but had to turn down the offer as his family could not afford for him to travel there. At school he was involved in association football, but was banned from the sport after a falling out with a referee, after which he turned to rugby. He was selected to represent the Transvaal school boys at Craven Week, earning a place in the South African schools boys side on the back of his performance there. Although he didn't go to university, he played for the Wits rugby club. In 1987 year he started playing for Transvaal, at the age of 18.

== Rugby career ==
=== Provincial career ===
Small played much of his provincial career under coach Harry Viljoen, following him from Transvaal to Natal in 1993, and to Western Province in 1998. That same year he returned to the Transvaal, then known as the Golden Lions, but "had a string of discipline problems with former All Black coach Laurie Mains". He played for the Cats in 1999, and retired after an injury.

=== International career ===
His first Test match in 1992 was the first for the Springboks at the dawn of the new, internationally acceptable South Africa following the release of Nelson Mandela and the unbanning of the ANC. He was one of the heroes of the Springbok team that won the 1995 Rugby World Cup and later that year experienced the transition of rugby from an amateur to a professional sport.

After the fall of apartheid, when the Springboks were being taught the lyrics to the new South African national anthem, "Nkosi Sikelel' iAfrika", Small was particularly enthusiastic about learning the lyrics. His response was that in his early days of playing rugby, he too was discriminated against, by Afrikaner players, for being of British descent rather than Dutch like they were. When the Springboks visited Robben Island on a tour, Small was very moved by what he saw and visibly wept, recalling later that "Thinking about Mandela's cell and how he spent twenty-seven years in prison and came out with love and friendship. All that washed over me, that huge realization, and the tears just rolled down my face."

Small faced Jonah Lomu as his opposite man in the final of the 1995 World Cup. Lomu had scored four tries in New Zealand's semifinal against England, but Small and his teammates managed to contain Lomu, preventing him from scoring. The Springboks won the match and the Cup.

Small's career was marred by his verbal abuse of others on the rugby field, gaining notoriety as being the "bad boy" of the Springbok team.

He became the first Springbok to ever be sent off, as a result of dissent towards referee Ed Morrison in the second test against Australia in 1993. In later years Small acknowledged that he felt he had let a lot of people down but that he was sent off as a result of an accumulation of incidents in the team. He faced a Springboks disciplinary hearing, but was selected for the third test match the following week.

Small was also alleged by his teammate Chester Williams to have uttered racist abuse towards him, though as an opponent in provincial rugby, not as a Springbok teammate.

=== Test match record ===
Against	P	W	D	L	Tri	Pts	% won
Argentina	5	5	0	0	5	25	100
Australia	9	4	0	5	3	15	44.44
British Lions	1	0	0	1	0	0	0
England	5	3	0	2	0	0	60
Fiji	1	1	0	0	0	0	100
France	9	6	1	2	4	20	72.22
Italy	2	2	0	0	2	10	100
New Zealand	9	1	1	7	0	0	16.67
Romania	1	1	0	0	0	0	100
Samoa	1	1	0	0	1	5	100
Scotland	1	1	0	0	2	10	100
Tonga	1	1	0	0	2	10	100
Wales	2	2	0	0	1	5	100
Total	47	28	2	17	20	100	61.7

Pld = Games played, W = Games won, D = Games drawn, L = Games lost, Tri = Tries scored, Pts = Points scored

=== Test tries (20) ===
Tries	Opposition	Location	Venue	Competition	Date	Result
1	France	Lyon, France	Stade de Gerland	Test match	17 October 1992	Won 20–15
1	France	Johannesburg, South Africa	Ellis Park	Test match	3 July 1993	Lost 17–18
2	Australia	Sydney, Australia	Sydney Football Stadium	Test match	31 July 1993	Won 19–12
1	Australia	Sydney, Australia	Sydney Football Stadium	Test match	21 August 1993	Lost 12–19
2	Argentina	Buenos Aires, Argentina	Ferro Carril Oeste Stadium	Test match	6 November 1993	Won 29–26
2	Argentina	Buenos Aires, Argentina	Ferro Carril Oeste Stadium	Test match	13 November 1993	Won 52–23
1	Samoa	Johannesburg, South Africa	Ellis Park	Test match	13 April 1995	Won 60–8
1	Wales	Johannesburg, South Africa	Ellis Park	Test match	2 September 1995	Won 40–11
1	Argentina	Buenos Aires, Argentina	Ferro Carril Oeste Stadium	Test match	9 November 1996	Won 46–15
1	France	Bordeaux, France	Stade du Parc Lescure	Test match	30 November 1996	Won 22–12
2	Tonga	Cape Town, South Africa	Newlands	Test match	10 June 1997	Won 74–10
2	Italy	Bologna, Italy	Dall'Ara Stadium	Test match	8 November 1997	Won 61–31
1	France	Lyon, France	Stade de Gerland	Test match	15 November 1997	Won 36–32
2	Scotland	Edinburgh, Scotland	Murrayfield	Test match	6 December 1997	Won 68–10

=== World Cup matches ===
Champions Runners-up Third place Fourth place

No.	Date	Opposition	Venue	Stage	Position	Tries	Result
1995
1.	25 May 1995	Australia	Newlands, Cape Town	Pool match	Right wing		27–18
2.	30 May 1995	Romania	Newlands, Cape Town	Pool match	Right wing		21–8
3.	17 Jun 1995	France	Kings Park, Durban	Semi-final	Right wing		19–15
4.	24 Jun 1995	New Zealand	Ellis Park, Johannesburg	Final	Right wing		15–12

== Post rugby life, career and business interests ==
During his time as rugby player, Small worked as a model and became something of a sporting sex symbol. In a 2018 interview with John Robbie on the Sport Exchange, he lamented not making more of the opportunities presented to him, and regretted not having someone helping him to professionally manage and market his image and brand, which he saw as being available to international overseas sports icons. He did not know how to handle the money and opportunities that were available to him at the time, and he admitted once spending all the money he had earned on six Armani suits, instead of his career management.

He was involved in the building industry, renovating houses. He also owned a number of restaurants including having opened Café Caprice in Camps Bay.

He was also involved in commentating, and in coaching the game. Small was involved with the Investec Rugby Academy, before being appointed Pukke assistant coach for the 2014 Varsity Cup. He then joined the Leopards in the Currie Cup First Division as coaching consultant. He was also involved in an online podcast "The elephant in the room" on rugby commentary with Darren Scott. The 50th birthday episode is available online.

In his personal life he was involved in a long term relationship with Christina Storm. She is a well known local celebrity, and the tabloids regularly reported on their relationship, which was tumultuous. Christina Storm (now Storm-Nel), with whom he has a daughter, Ruby Small, has since married and has other children. He has publicly acknowledged and apologised for his abusive treatment of her, including in two incidents which turned physically violent. These claims were denied and proved untrue by Storm in an interview for ‘YOU’ magazine in 2020. He also sought therapy for a period of two years. He has said he has been arrogant and petulant, and it resulted in losing the love of his life. There was a publicised court battle over custody of his daughter.

He also attempted suicide in 2001, following the break up and was hospitalised and sectioned under South Africa's Mental Health Care Act for 3 months. He has also admitted misusing alcohol and cocaine, and had major struggles with alcohol misuse. President Nelson Mandela reportedly phoned him personally and asked him what happened following his hospitalisation. The President listened to him and then simply said, "I know what it feels like if you think people have forgotten about you. I went through it as well in my time in prison." The two men were said to have a personal relationship. Small felt this helped him gain some perspective on his problems, and he was moved by the President's humanity in reaching out to him.

He attributed his recovery to his great friendships and his commitment to his, at the time, newborn daughter.

== Death ==
Small died in the hospital on Wednesday morning on 10 July 2019, at the age of 50, after suffering a heart attack while having drinks at The Harem, a strip club in Johannesburg. Club co-owner, Jerome Saffi, confirmed that Small had collapsed while having drinks at the bar while waiting for a date. An autopsy revealed the cause of death as ischemic heart disease, and the police investigation into the circumstances surrounding his death revealed no suspicious circumstances.

Small's memorial was held at the Wanderers Rugby Field, and was open to all mourners. Former Springboks who attended included James Dalton, Kobus Wiese, Pierre Spies, Rudolf Straeuli, John Smit and Stefan Terblanche. Current Springbok captain Siya Kolisi was also there, as was Small's former partner, Christina Storm.

Small was survived by his son (9) and daughter (15), his sister and his mother. The South African Rugby Legends Association established a fundraising initiative in aid of James Small's family.

== Tributes and legacy ==
His record on the field, and the very many tributes from the sporting fraternity, amongst others, speak for themselves. Some examples are cited below:

"The African National Congress (ANC) is shocked and saddened by the passing of former Springbok player, James Small.

He was a member of the South African Rugby squad that won the World Cup in 1995, a year after the ushering in of a democratic government in South Africa. The class of 1995 contributed towards uniting the nation and displaying to the world South Africa’s sporting prowess. James Small was a man who fought in the field. The ANC conveys its condolences to his family, friends and the entire sporting world."

The All Blacks referred to him as a Springbok great and the 1995 Rugby World Cup winner, and went on to say he was "a fierce competitor on the field and great friend off it, James will be missed by the entire global rugby community. Rest In Peace, legend." The Wallabies also acknowledged him as a legend. The widow of Jonah Lomu also acknowledged his death.

== See also ==
- List of South Africa national rugby union players – Springbok no. 561
