= Capricious =

Capricious may refer to:

- Capricieuse, also spelled Capricious, a solitaire card game
- Capricious (cheese), an aged goat's milk cheese

== See also ==
- Arbitrary and capricious, a legal term
- Caprice (disambiguation)
