= The Sheltering Desert =

1992 film

- Directed by: Regardt van den Bergh
- Starring: Jason Connery
- Release dates: January 1, 1992
- Running time: +105 minutes
- Countries: South Africa, United Kingdom
- Language: English

The Sheltering Desert is a 1992 South African-British-Irish drama film directed by Regardt van den Bergh and starring Jason Connery, Rupert Graves and Joss Ackland. The film was a co-production between Ireland, South Africa and the United Kingdom. It is listed in the film list of the British production company Vine International Pictures Ltd.

The Sheltering Desert is also the name of the book the film is based upon. It is an autobiographical account written by Henno Martin. Its original German title is "Wenn es Krieg gibt, gehen wir in die Wüste". The English as well as the German edition are published by the German publisher Two Books.

== Plot summary ==
In 1935, two German geologists, Henno Martin and Hermann Korn, leave Nazi Germany for South West Africa (Namibia) to conduct field research. At the outbreak of the Second World War, many male Germans living in South-West Africa are interned in local camps. As pacifists the two German scientists refuse to be arrested and flee into the Namib Desert. They live for over two years in the vastness of the desert like ancient bushmen under indescribable circumstances, facing the challenge to survive and, at the same time, the threat to be detected. On the radio they follow the war events in Europe. Their adventure comes to an end when Hermann Korn starts suffering seriously from malnutrition.

== Cast ==
- Jason Connery as Henno Martin
- Rupert Graves as Hermann Korn
- Joss Ackland as Col. Johnston
- Kate Normington as Brigitte
- John Carson as Harding
- Franz Dobrowsky as De Kock
- Michael Brunner as Zoeller
- Gavin Hood as Willi
- Will Bernard as Policeman
- Glenn Swart as Grobbelaar
