= Kidnap and Ransom =

British television miniseries

- DVD cover for series two
- Genre: Drama
- Screenplay by: Patrick Harbinson; Michael Crompton
- Directed by: Andy Wilson; David Drury
- Starring: Trevor Eve; Helen Baxendale; Emma Fielding; Sharon Maughan; Natasha Little; Patrick Baladi; John Hannah; David James; Kimberley Nixon
- Country of origin: United Kingdom
- Original language: English
- No. of series: 2
- No. of episodes: 6

Production
- Executive producer: Trevor Eve
- Producer: Trevor Hopkins
- Running time: 47 minutes
- Production company: Projector Pictures

Original release
- Network: ITV
- Release: 13 January 2011 – 8 March 2012

Kidnap and Ransom is a British television three-part miniseries, originally shown on ITV in January 2011 with a second series following in February 2012. The series follows the work of a British hostage negotiator Dominic King, played by Trevor Eve, who is also executive producer of the series.

ITV cancelled Kidnap and Ransom on 28 May 2012.

== Series 1 (2011) ==
The first series of Kidnap and Ransom was written by Patrick Harbinson, directed by Andy Wilson, and filmed entirely in South Africa, including scenes that were set in London. It was commissioned by ITV and produced by Trevor Eve's production company, Projector Pictures, and distributed internationally by Fremantle Media. It was released on DVD in the UK on 17 February 2011.

=== Episodes ===
No. overall	No. in season	Directed by	Written by	Original release date	UK viewers (millions)
1	1	Andy Wilson	Patrick Harbinson	13 January 2011	6.68 million
The episode begins with Dominic King (Trevor Eve) realizing that he has just failed at a negotiated ransom, having paid a group of kidnappers for a corpse. He returns home to London to his wife Sophie (Natasha Little) who is encouraging him to cut back on his own work in order to be more supportive of her political ambitions, and to his daughter Tess (Laura Greenwood) who is suddenly very interested in religion. Meanwhile, in South Africa, botanist Naomi Shaffer (Fielding) is kidnapped by two men during a violent encounter which results in her taxi driver being killed. Her employer in London, Jane Wickham (Sharon Maughan), calls upon King to negotiate her release. He does so successfully, travelling to South Africa to oversee the exchange of the ransom for Shaffer. All seems to be going well until the very trade-off when a second group of violent kidnappers appears, attacking and killing one member of the first group, stealing Shaffer and her second original kidnapper away, and leaving King where he stands, dumbfounded.
2	2	Andy Wilson	Patrick Harbinson	20 January 2011	5.64 million
Back in London, King's business partner Angela Beddoes (Baxendale) sends his assistant Carrie (Amara Karan) to South Africa to help him figure out what has happened while placating Shaffer's employer. It is revealed that Shaffer is now in the hands of a shadowy figure named Willard (Hannah) and his henchmen, who proceed to beat and then execute the original kidnapper for "getting greedy." After a botched escape attempt, Shaffer is [off camera] raped by one of Willard's henchmen. Wickham puts Willard in touch with King, who again negotiates her release. He is surprised when he is able to quickly reduce Willard's demands from $2 million to $500,000. However, Shaffer is successfully traded for the ransom money and King delivers her back to her husband Philip (Baladi) and daughter Sally. King remains suspicious of the situation and clashes briefly with Beddoes about keeping an eye on Shaffer. King visits Shaffer at her home. She is distant but polite and assures him that all is well, and he leaves. In his own family, King's daughter has left the family home to live in a religious compound. After King's visit, Shaffer is contacted directly by a threatening Willard who then proceeds to kidnap Sally from the Shaffer home.
3	3	Andy Wilson	Patrick Harbinson	27 January 2011	5.64 million
Contacting King after the kidnap of her daughter Sally, Shaffer reveals that Willard is now after the work of her husband Philip, who has created an anti-obesity drug that would be very lucrative on the black market. Philip however refuses to give up the formula in exchange for the daughter; King attempts to meet with Willard and trade a bogus formula for Sally but Willard has suspected his ruse and King only finds Sally's finger in a garbage can at the meeting site. Meanwhile, Beddoes realizes that it was Shaffer's boss Wickham that told Willard about the existence of Philip's work during his original phone call and alerts the authorities. Philip Shaffer is now convinced to give up the actual formula, and King meets Willard in a tense face-to-face, but secures Sally's release in exchange for the formula. After the exchange, King follows Willard a short distance and shoots the man in the hand but allows him to live; Willard is whisked away by his henchmen while King returns Sally to her family and then returns to his office. On the phone with his wife, we see King's daughter in the background of their family home; his wife informs him that the daughter is visiting for dinner, which "is a start."

=== Starring ===
- Trevor Eve as Dominic King, a former soldier turned expert hostage negotiator.
- Helen Baxendale as Angela Beddoes, Dominic's business partner.
- Amara Karan as Carrie Heath, Dominic's assistant.
- Natasha Little as Sophie King, Dominic's wife.
- Emma Fielding as Naomi Shaffer, a botanist who is working in South Africa when she is kidnapped.
- Sharon Maughan as Jane Wickham, Shaffer's boss.
- Patrick Baladi as Philip Shaffer, Naomi Shaffer's husband.
- John Hannah as kidnapper Alexander Willard.
- David James as Dieter DeVries, one of Willard's brutal henchman.

=== Reception ===
The first series received generally positive reviews. Sam Wollaston of The Guardian stated, "Eve is very good at playing the flawed and difficult professional, the maverick taking on the world. Everyone is good here. And everything – it's a proper thriller – grabs you by the goolies and drags you along at 100mph." Alice-Azania Jarvis of The Independent said, "In all, it was a persuasive drama, the human trauma sufficiently realistic, sufficiently great as to render the viewer hooked."

== Series 2 (2012) ==
On 5 May 2011, it was announced that ITV had commissioned a second series of the drama, the plot of which would involve a group of tourists kidnapped in India. The second series was written by Michael Crompton directed by David Drury, and filmed entirely in South Africa. It was produced by Trevor Hopkins and Trevor Eve's production company, Projector Pictures, and distributed internationally by Fremantle Media. The first episode aired on 23 February 2012. It is scheduled for DVD release on 26 March 2012.

=== Episodes ===
No. overall	No. in season	Directed by	Written by	Original release date	UK viewers (millions)
4	1	David Drury	Michael Crompton	23 February 2012	5.79 million
The episode starts with Dominic King disposing of what seems like a body from a small boat in a lake. There is a then a flashback to his travels two weeks earlier to Srinagar in Kashmir in India to negotiate the hostage release of a British family. After the exchange the police interfere which results in a shoot-out, which kills one of the negotiators. The other kidnappers get away and in their panic take a tourist bus hostage. King is forced to negotiate the tourists' freedom, while persuading the police not to shoot. The UK government initially is unwilling to interfere in Indian hostage negotiations, which is likely to result in a shoot-out with a crack Indian sniper team. However, during negotiations King realises that one of the tourists is the daughter of the British Foreign Secretary, which of course changes the stance of the UK government.
5	2	David Drury	Michael Crompton	1 March 2012	5.59 million
Dominic King tries to negotiate the release of the hostages before anyone discovers that the daughter of the British Foreign Secretary is on board, but when a police sniper shoots at the kidnappers, they panic and drive away.
6	3	David Drury	Michael Crompton	8 March 2012	4.99 million
The British Foreign Secretary puts pressure on Dominic King to facilitate the release of his daughter. When King discovers who carried out the original kidnapping, he determines not to let them get away.

=== Starring ===
- Trevor Eve as Dominic King, a former soldier turned expert hostage negotiator.
- Helen Baxendale as Angela Beddoes, Dominic's business partner.
- Amara Karan as Carrie Heath, Dominic's assistant.
- Natasha Little as Sophie King, Dominic's wife.
- Kimberley Nixon as Florence Holland, daughter of the British Foreign Secretary.
- Sean Gilder as Sean Cooper, who is kidnapped together with Florence Holland.
- Christopher Fairbank as Chris Taylor, one of the British hostages on the bus.
- Barbara Marten as Janet Taylor, wife of Chris and also a hostage on the bus.
- Owen Teale as Robert Holland, the British Foreign Secretary and father to Florence Holland.
- Sharon Small as Beth Cooper, Sean's wife and daughter of Chris and Janet.
- Madhur Mittal as Anwar Razdan, one of the kidnappers.
- Hasina Haque as Leela Nishad, another of the kidnappers.
- Gregg Chillin as Mahavir Mehta, the instigator of the first kidnapping and Leela's boyfriend.

=== Reception ===
The second series also received generally positive reviews. Stuart Jeffries of The Guardian stated, "Eve is even better in this than he was two years ago," and called the script "especially impressive."
