= Messum Crater =

Mountain in Namibia

- ISS image of the Messum Crater, 2026. The Messum River cuts the northern igneous ring of the crater.

Highest point
- Coordinates: 21°21′45″S 14°25′8″E

Geography
- Location within Namibia
- Location: Dâures Constituency, Erongo Region, Namibia

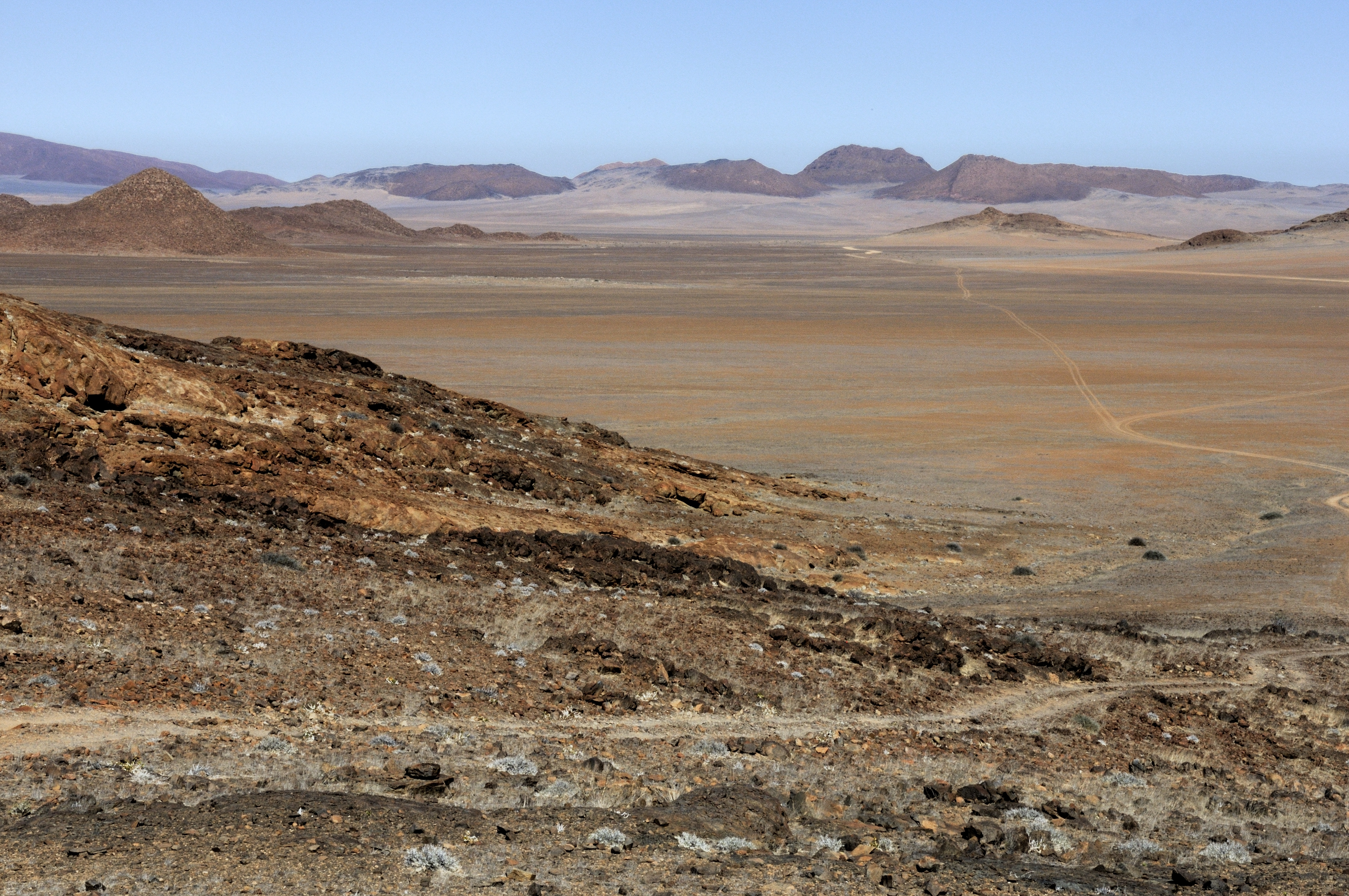
View into the Messum Crater

The Messum Crater is the Namibian remainder of a gigantic volcanic eruption that happened before Africa and South America broke apart. This eruption is thought to have been the single largest explosive volcanic eruption in the history of the Earth.

The Messum Crater is situated within Dorob National Park in the Erongo Region of eastern central Namibia. Its igneous ring measures approx. 18–23 km (11–14 mi) across.

== Geology ==
Messum Crater is situated within the Goboboseb Mountains. Both are part of the Messum igneous complex, which in turn is part of the Paraná-Etendeka large igneous province that extends from Brazil to Namibia and Angola. It also contains nearby Spitzkoppe and Brandberg mountains.

It is thought that the crater formed through repeated sagging into a funnel caldera, approximately 132 million years ago. The dimensions of the igneous ring only account for a small fraction of the size of the magma chamber underneath, evidenced by the tilt of the surrounding strata.

== Discovery and contemporary use ==
The crater is named after the Messum River which flows along the crater ring. The river in turn is named after British captain William Messum who discovered it in 1850 on his expedition to the Brandberg. The Messum igneous complex as a geological structure was discovered in 1939 by German geologist Henno Martin.

Today it is an insider destination for Namibian hobby geologists and travelers, but due to lack of infrastructure not visited often by international tourists. The Messum can be reached via the district road D2342 from Uis, and via an undesignated 4x4 trail from Cape Cross.
