= Hamilton Dhlamini =

South African actor

- Born: Hamilton Dhlamini; 15 December 1969 (age 56); Sebokeng, South Africa
- Occupations: Actor, playwright, producer, director
- Years active: 1984–present

Hamilton Dhlamini (born 15 December 1969), sometimes known as Hamilton Dlamini, is a South African actor, playwright and filmmaker. He is best known for the roles in the films and teleserials Isithembiso, Faith like Potatoes and The King's Messenger .

== Personal life ==
He was born on 15 December 1969 in a township south of Johannesburg, South Africa, called Sebokeng, Vaal Triangle to a family with poor economic standing.

He is married to a nutritionist, Martha; they have three children. He first met Martha in a lift.

== Career ==
He started his acting career in early 1984 through stage plays. He also played a businessman, Korea, in the SABC 1 sitcom Mzee Wa Two Six. In early 2008, he had a lead role in the short series on SABC1, adapted from William Shakespeare’s play King Lear. Also, he played a lead character on the SABC 2 sitcom Stokvel in the role of Mojo Khumalo. In 2008, he acted in the series Ten Bush directed by Mncedisi Shabangu. For his role, he later won the Naledi Theatre Award for the best supporting actor. In 2009, he collaborated with William Kentridge and the Handspring Puppet Company on Woyzeck in the Highveld.

In 2006, he acted in Regardt van den Bergh’s film Faith like Potatoes. This time, he won a South African Film and Television Awards (Safta) for best supporting actor for his role. In 2007, he won the Golden Horn Award for Best Supporting Actor in a Feature Film. In 2018, he played Banzi Motaung in the popular television series Isithembiso. In the same year, he again won the Golden Horn Award for Best Actor in a TV soap opera, 'Isithembiso'.

In 2018, he starred in the play Woza Albert with Joburg City Theatres, which was staged at the Kenya International Theatre Festival. His outstanding performance and the general impact of Woza Albert in the festival attribute to his celebration as the most outstanding act of the previous year in the 2019 edition of the Kenya International Theatre Festival. He appeared in the official #KITFest2019 poster.

He also founded his own production company, Ndlondlo Productions.

== Filmography ==
Year	Film	Role	Genre	Ref.
1990	The King's Messenger	Poacher	Film	
2001	Scoop Schoombie	Sparks	TV series	
2004	Gums & Noses	Street Dealer	Film	
2006	Faith like Potatoes	Simeon Bhengu	Film	
2009	Izingane Zobaba	Lucky	TV series	
2010	Jozi	Traffic cop	Film	
2011	Otelo Burning	Skhumbuzo	Film	
2013	Nothing for Mahala	Foreman	Film	
2016	Fluiters	Bantu Ntenga	TV series	
2016	Umlilo	Mnqobi Simelane	Film	
2017	Lokoza	Director	Short film	
2017	Five Fingers for Marseilles	Sepoko	Film	
2018	Isithembiso	Banzi Motaung	TV series	
2021	Isibaya	Andile Sibiya		
2021	DiepCity	Bonga Jele	TV series	
2021	Reyka	Hector Zwane	TV series	
2024	Queendom BET	King Banzi Khahlamba	TV drama series	

== Other Television roles ==
- Askies!, season 1 as Homeless Man
- Boo & TT, season 1 as TT
- City Ses'la, season 1 as Uncle Mto eKasi
- Our Stories, season 5 as Mbangiseni
- Fluiters, season 1 as Bantu Ntenga
- Home Affairs, season 2 as Katleho's Father
- Home Affairs, season 3 & 4 as Senzo Mbatha
- Izingane zoBaba, season 1 as Lucky
- Mutual Friends (2014), season 1 as Pat
- Mzansi, season 1 & 2 as Prosper
- Mzee wa Two Six, season 1 as Korea
- Saints and Sinners, season 2 as Andries
- Shooting Stars, season 2 as Themba Zwane
- Soul Buddyz, season 1 as Melusi's Teacher
- Stokvel, season 6 as Mojo Khumalo
- The Mayor, season 1 as Mapula
- Matlala Umlilo, season 1, 2, 3 & 4 as Mnqobi Simelane
- Zero Tolerance, season 1 as Lefty
- Zero Tolerance, season 3 as President Tubman
- Emzini Wezinsizwa, as Ndwandwe
- Shaka iLembe as King Jobe ka Nyambose
- Nikiwe

== See also ==
- 2018 DStv Mzansi Viewers' Choice Awards
- List of South African films
