= Henno Martin =

German geologist (1910–1998)

- Born: 15 March 1910; Freiburg, Germany
- Died: 7 January 1998 (aged 87)
- Known for: Discovery of Messum Igneous Complex; Securing water supply to Windhoek; Gravitational nappe transport
- Awards: Hans-Stille-Medaille (1975); Gustav-Steinmann-Medaille (1980)
- Scientific career
- Fields: Geology
- Workplaces: Geological Survey of Namibia; University of São Paulo; University of Cape Town; University of Göttingen
- Doctoral advisor: Hans Cloos

Henno Martin (15 March 1910 – 7 January 1998) was a German professor of geology who, along with Hermann Korn, lived for two and a half years in the Namib Desert to avoid internment during the Second World War.

== Personal life ==
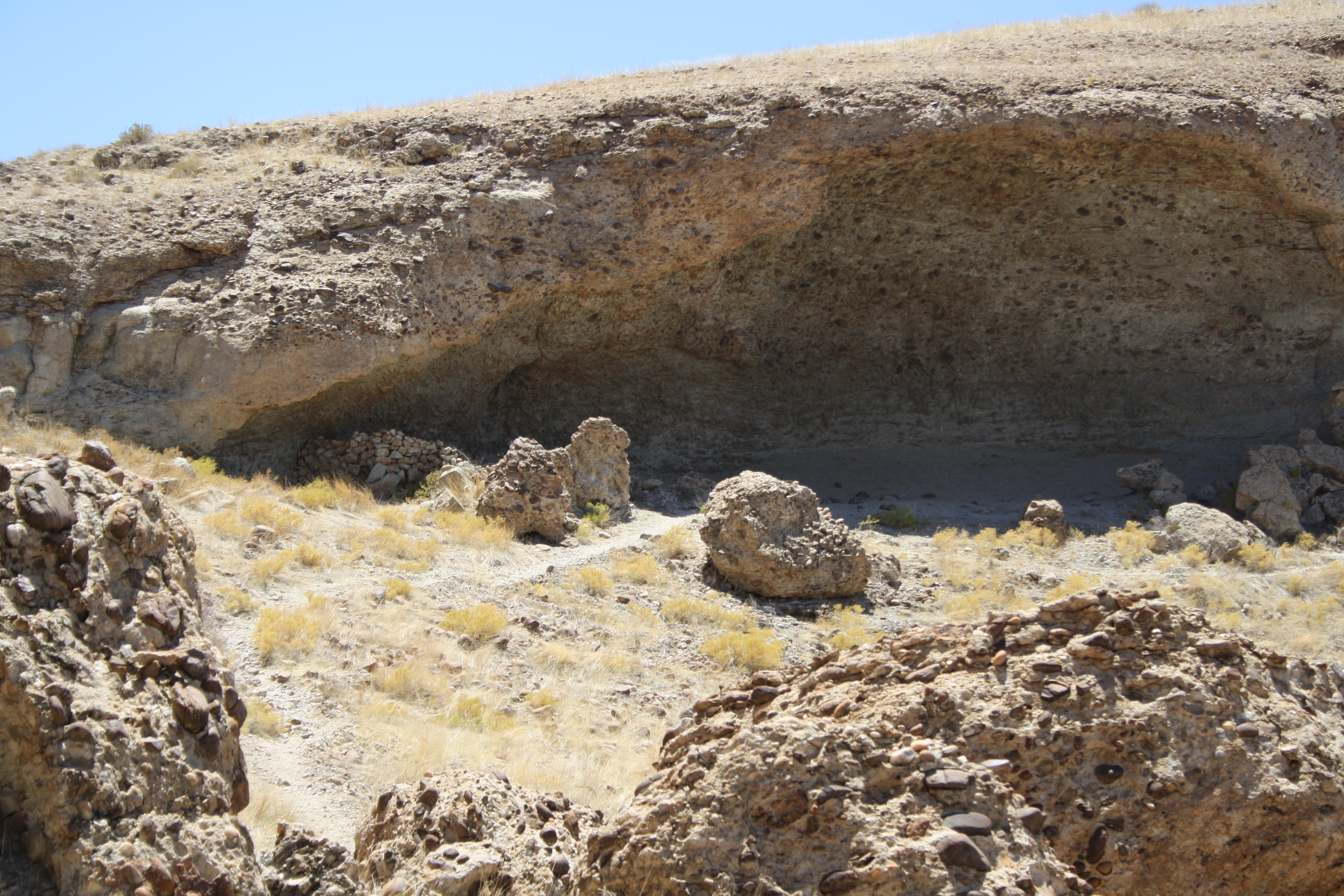
Ruins of the Shelter in the Kuiseb Canyon

Martin was born in Freiburg, Germany on 15 March 1910. His studies at the universities of Bonn, Zürich, and Göttingen culminated in a Ph.D on "Post-Archean Tectonics in Southern Central Sweden". In 1935 he emigrated along with Korn to what was then South-West Africa (now Namibia) (a former German colony) and worked as a consulting geologist. Namibia was at that time administered by its neighbor, South Africa and in 1939 South Africa, following the United Kingdom, declared war on Germany. In 1940, fearing internment as enemy aliens by the South African government, Martin and Korn decided to flee into the Namib desert and to wait out the war in the remote and rugged Kuiseb Canyon. They returned to Windhoek in 1942 after Korn developed beri-beri. They were not interned on their return and before the war ended were employed as surveyors by the government. In 1957 Martin wrote The Sheltering Desert, a memoir of his experiences while living in the Namib. The work was first published in German and has been translated into other languages. A 1992 film covers the story.

== Career ==
Martin discovered the Messum Crater in 1939, the Namibian remainder of a gigantic volcanic eruption that happened before Africa and South America broke apart. This eruption is thought to have been the single largest explosive volcanic eruption in the history of the Earth.

After the war he worked as a consulting geologist, specialising in exploration for underground water resources. He selected the locations of boreholes throughout South-West Africa and particularly in the capital Windhoek, where he "provided the city with its first large-scale, reliable source of water".

From 1958 to 1960, he taught structural geology at the University of São Paulo. Martin worked for 20 years as Director of the Geological Survey of Namibia. In 1963 he joined the University of Cape Town as director of the Precambrian Research Unit, and in 1964 he became Head of Geology at University of Göttingen.

The Geological Society of Namibia, whose honorary patron Martin was, awards the Henno Martin Medal annually for the best scientific publication by a geologist living in Namibia.

== Selected bibliography ==
- Martin, Henno (1957). The Sheltering Desert.
- Martin, Henno (1961). The Hypothesis of Continental Drift in the Light of Recent Advances of Geological Knowledge in Brazil and in South West Africa. Geological Society of South Africa
- Martin, Henno (1965). The Precambrian Geology of South West Africa and Namaqualand. Cape Town: Precambrian Research Unit, University of Cape Town
