= 1997 Tonga rugby union tour of Africa =

Summary
P	W	D	L
Total
7	4	0	3
Test match
3	2	0	1
Opponent
P	W	D	L
Zimbabwe
1	1	0	0
Namibia
1	1	0	0
South Africa
1	0	0	1

The 1997 Tonga rugby union tour of Africa was a series of matches played in May and June 1997 in Zimbabwe, Namibia and South Africa by Tonga national rugby union team.

== Results ==
Scores and results list Tonga's points tally first.

Opponent	For	Against	Date	Venue	Status
Zimbabwe	42	13	17 May 1997	Police Ground, Harare	Test match
Namibia B	31	38	21 May 1997		Tour match
Namibia	20	14	24 May 1997	South West Stadium, Windhoek	Test match
Northern Transvaal XV	6	46	28 May 1997	Pretoria	Tour match
Eastern Province	34	19	1 June 1997	Adcock Stadium, Port Elizabeth	Tour match
Border	27	10	4 June 1997	Waverley Park, East London	Tour match
South Africa	10	74	10 June 1997	Newlands Stadium, Cape Town	Test match
