= A Caprice =

Painting by Aubrey Beardsley

"The Comedy-Ballet of Marionnettes, as performed by the troupe of the Theatre-Impossible", first drawing, published in The Yellow Book, vol.2, July 1894

A Caprice is the only known oil painting by English artist Aubrey Beardsley, made c.1894. It has been held by the Tate Gallery since 1923. Unusually, the work is painted with two different images, one on each side of the canvas. The unfinished surreal images both have covert sexual imagery.

The painting on the front of the canvas, A Caprice, is believed to have been painted first. It depicts a scene in a theatre. A woman in a black dress with green details is being led by a short black-faced person in a red costume towards an arched doorway opening onto an auditorium. The woman has a white feather in her black hat, and is holding a white muff; her pallid white face is shown in profile, with prominent red lips and cheeks.

The painting seems to be inspired by the first of Beardsley's three images depicting "The Comedy-Ballet of Marionnettes, as performed by the troupe of the Theatre-Impossible, posed in three drawings", which were published in the second volume of the avant-garde art journal The Yellow Book in July 1894. In the illustration, drapes hanging in the arched doorway give it a phallic appearance. In the painting, the red-clothed dwarf with black face may represent female genitalia.

On the reverse is a painting known as Masked Woman with a White Mouse. The subject, a woman in a black face mask, is similarly wearing a dark dress, and made up with white skin with red lips and a black beauty spot, and black hair. Incongruously, a white mouse is passing on a flat surface before her, as if along the edge of a balcony, but she pays it no attention. The painting occupies the slightly smaller space within the stretcher, which frames the composition. The mouse is commonly interpreted a Freudian symbol for the penis, although some commentators have noted that Freud's psychoanalytical work was not known in London in 1894.

A Caprice measures 30 in × 25 in (76 cm × 64 cm); Masked Woman with a White Mouse measures 25.25 in × 20.25 in (64.1 cm × 51.4 cm). The paintings may be influenced by William Rothenstein, who also contributed to The Yellow Book and with whom Beardsley shared a studio. The paintings may also be influenced by works of Pietro Longhi depicting the Venetian Carnival.

Neither painting was finished, and the canvas was abandoned by Beardsley in 1895 and left behind at 114 Cambridge Street, Pimlico, when his lease ended. It was found by the new tenant, Mrs. Pugh, along with many drawings which she destroyed. It was bought by R.A. Walker in 1920; he gave it the title A Caprice, and sold it to the Tate in 1923.
