= USS Caprice =

USS Caprice has been the name of more than one United States Navy ship, and may refer to:

- USS Caprice (SP-703), a patrol vessel in commission from 1917 to 1919
- USS Caprice (PG-90), a patrol boat transferred to the British Royal Navy upon completion in 1943 and renamed HMS Honesty (K285)
