= Christina Storm =

South African actress and model (born 1974)

- Born: Christina Storm; 1 April 1974 (age 52); Pretoria, South Africa
- Occupations: Actress, Model, Entrepreneur
- Years active: 1989–present
- Height: 171 cm (5 ft 7 in)
- Spouses: James Small; Paul Nel (m. 2013)
- Children: 4

Christina Storm (born 1 April 1974) is a South African actress, model and entrepreneur. She is best known for her fashion modelling and dominated the commercials with more than 200 television commercials. In acting, she is best known for the roles she starred-in, in the films; Kite (2014), Eternity (2010) and Ek Lief Jou.

== Personal life ==
Storm was born on 1 April 1974 in Pretoria, South Africa. When she was young, her parents separated and her father moved overseas. Then her mother, who was a gypsy, remarried. Therefore, she had a tourist-like life where she attended nine different schools for her education.

She was in a relationship with former Springbok rugby player James Small for ten years, with whom she has one child, Ruby Cina Small. However, they had constant break-ups. On 10 July 2019, Small died in hospital at the age of 50, after suffering a heart attack while having drinks at The Harem, a strip club in Johannesburg. Club co-owner, Jerome Saffi, confirmed that Small had collapsed while having drinks at the bar. An autopsy revealed the cause of death as ischemic heart disease, and the police investigation into the circumstances surrounding his death revealed no suspicious circumstances. After seven months of dating, she married Paul Nel and the wedding ceremony took place on the 9 of October 2013. The couple have two children: Eve and Vincent. Paul is the owner of three businesses: Café Mexicho, Showco and Presentech.

In late 2020, she suffered from depression and anxiety and was later taken to a rehabilitation program.

== Career ==
As a successful model, she appeared several times in popular magazine covers such as: "Elle" in May 1997, "SL" in October 1999, "South Africa: Sports Illustrated" swimwear in 1999, "Gentlemen Quarterly" (GQ) in 1999 and "Playboy" in September 2011.

In 2007, she made her maiden television acting with the M-Net soap opera Egoli. In the series, she played the role of "Bienkie Naude". In 2010, she acted in the serials Jacket Dance and Wild at heart, where she portrayed the character "Sammi". In the same year, she starred in the film Jakhalsdan with the role "Vanessa Ruiters" and then in the film Eternity as "Lisa". After that, she joined with M-Net reality program Survivor South Africa: Santa Carolina as one of the celebrity contestants.

In 2011, she acted in the film I Love You by playing the role of "Lisa Sneiders". In the preceding years, she made many film appearances such as: Stealing time (2013), Kite (2014) with the role "Sawa’s mother", Everything crazy (2014) as "Elzaan Mostert", The Ghost Of Uniondale (2014) as "Tanie Miempie".

== Filmography ==
Year	Film	Role	Genre	Ref.
2010	Wild at Heart	Sammi	TV series	
2010	Jakhalsdans	Vanessa Ruiters	Film	
2010	Egoli: Afrikaners is Plesierig	Bienkie	Film	
2010	Eternity	Lisa	Film	
2011	Ek Lief Jou	Lisa Sneiders	Film	
2013	Stealing Time		Film	
2014	Kite	Sawa's Mother	Film	
2014	Alles Wat Mal Is	Elzaan Mostert	Film	
2014	Die Spook van Uniondale	Miempie Crouse	Film	
