= Café Caprice =

Beach bar and restaurant in Camps Bay, Cape Town, South Africa

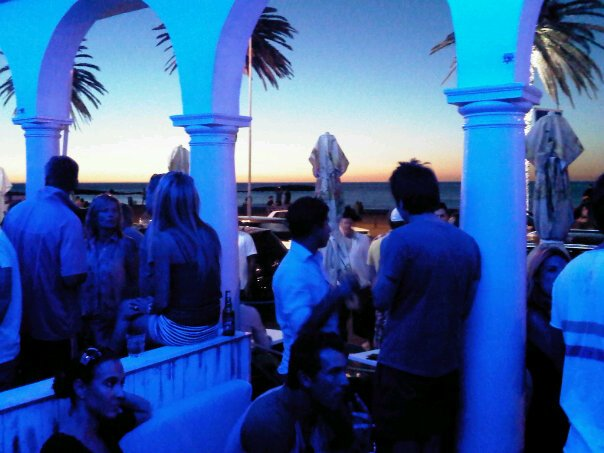
- Sunset over Camps Bay
- Interactive map of Café Caprice
- Address: 37 Victoria Road Camps Bay
- Location: Camps Bay, Cape Town, South Africa
- Coordinates: 33°57′01.44″S 18°22′43.32″E
- Type: Restaurant; Nightclub

Construction
- Opened: 3 November 2001; 24 years ago

Website
- Café Caprice

Café Caprice is a beach bar and restaurant located on Camps Bay Beach in Camps Bay, Cape Town, South Africa overlooking the Atlantic Ocean. The café is noted for its cocktails and for the celebrities that frequent it. South African rugby player and restaurateur, James Small, was an owner and founder of the club.

On 17 April 2017 the café was the scene of a shooting that injured two people. The shooting was related to an organised crime turf war between competing bouncer companies in Cape Town. Two men were arrested for the shooting.
