= Caprice, Ghana =

Place in Accra, Ghana

Caprice
- Town
- Caprice
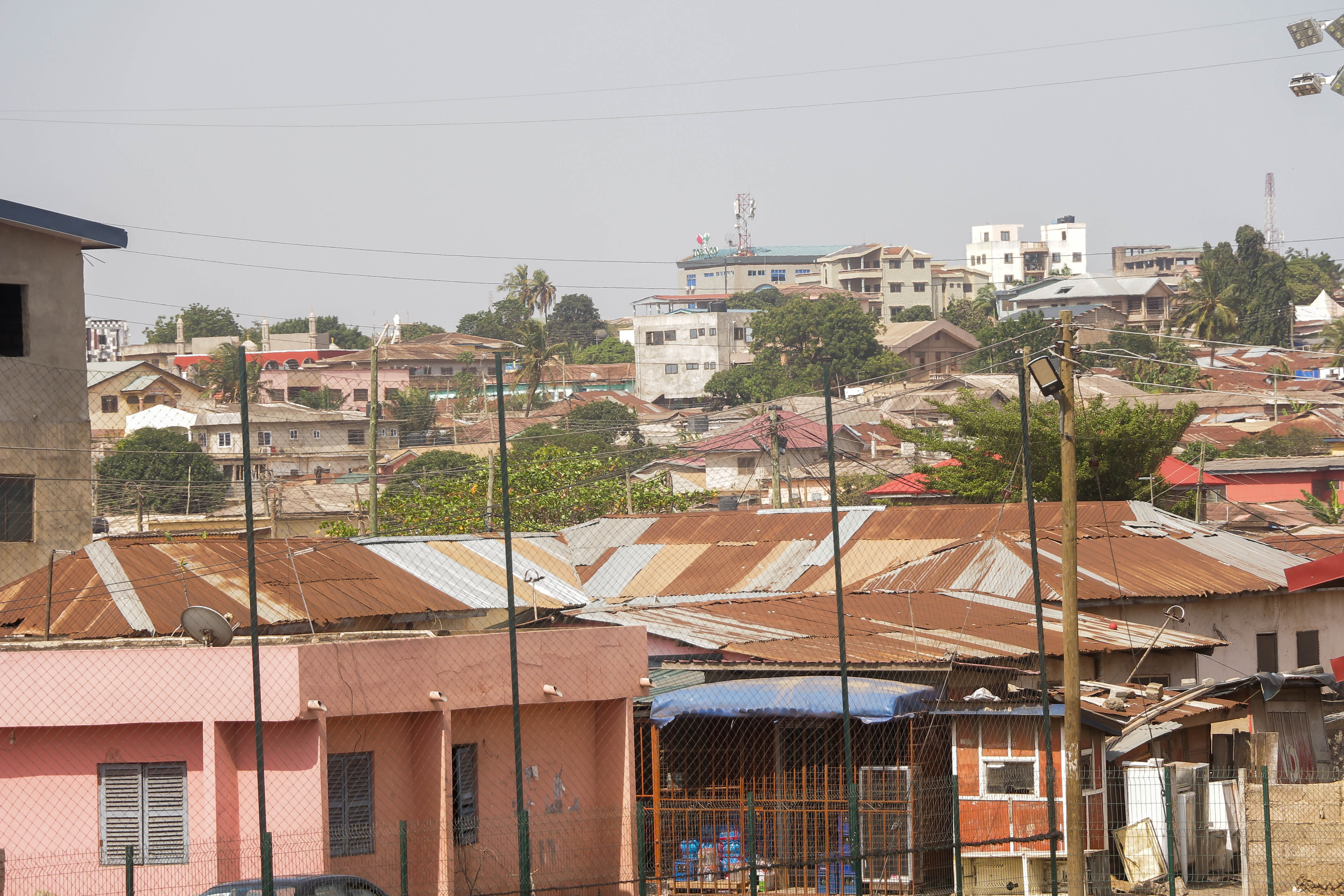
- Caprice neighborhood
- Country: Ghana
- Region: Greater Accra Region
- District: Accra Metropolitan
- Time zone: GMT
  - Summer (DST): GMT

Caprice is a suburb of Accra near the Kwame Nkrumah Circle in the Accra Metropolitan District in the Greater Accra Region of Ghana. The City Business College is located in Caprice. Caprice is a neighborhood around the National Police Training School.
