= Mile 108, Namibia =

Mile 108 Myl 108 (Afrikaans)
- Village
- Location in Namibia
- Coordinates: 21°26′33″S 13°49′10″E
- Country: Namibia
- Region: Erongo
- Website: www.nwr.com.na/resorts/mile-108/

Mile 108 (Afrikaans: Myl 108) is a fishing village and campground in the Erongo Region of Namibia, on the Skeleton Coast. It is a beachfront accommodation with fishing chalets and sizeable campsites.

The accommodation options in Mile 108 include beach camping, self-contained camping, camping with private ablutions, and the Fisherman's Cabins. The beach camping sites are over 170 sites marked out with stones.
