= Mighty Men Conference =

Gathering of Christian men, 2004 to 2010

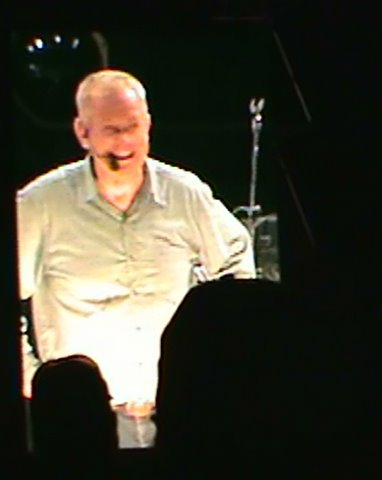
- Angus Buchan preaching at MMC 2010 4

The Mighty Men Conference, organised by Shalom Trust of South Africa, was an annual gathering of Christian men and boys which ran from 2004 to 2010. The Conference included camping outdoors and preaching by Angus Buchan.

South African farmer Angus Buchan began the conference in 2004, with reports of attendees varying from a few dozen to 240. The number of attendees grew rapidly, with numbers reportedly rising to 600 in 2005 to 1060 in 2006, 7,400 in 2007 and 60,000 in 2008. The final national event in 2010 was attended by up to 300,000 men and boys. Mighty Men Conferences have continued around South Africa and the world, however these are no longer one central conference organised by the Shalom Trust.

In 2014, Mighty Men of God, Inc, a Christian organization from Orlando, Florida brought a lawsuit against Angus Buchan and World Outreach Church of Murfreesboro Tennessee, Incorporated for using the name "Mighty Men" in the United States, which it had trademarked in 2004. In April 2015 United States District Judge Carlos Eduardo Mendoza denied a motion to dismiss the case from Buchan and the World Outreach Church.
