= Pieter Toerien =

South African producer and theatre manager

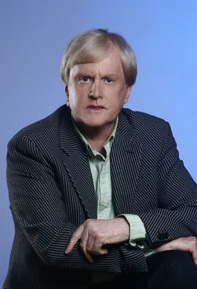
Pieter Toerien

Pieter Toerien (born 1942) is a South African producer and theatre manager, responsible for bringing many large scale musicals to South African stages, including Cats, Disney's Beauty and the Beast, The Lion King and Phantom of the Opera, as well as a number of original and play productions, often collaborating with others in the field.

== Early life and career ==
Toerien's theatre career started while still at school, presenting puppet shows to schools in his home town of Cape Town. At age 17, he introduced the concept of bio-vaudeville – persuading cinema managements to have live entertainment before the feature film. Under the mentorship of Britain's theatre agent Herbert de Leon and in partnership with Basil Rubin, he brought British variety artists such as Alma Cogan and Dickie Valentine to South Africa, eventually adding Russ Conway (1964), Peter Nero (1966), Shelly Berman, Cyd Charisse, Tony Martin, Françoise Hardy and Maurice Chevalier (1967) to his list of luminaries.

At the age of 20 he sat on the street outside the apartment of German actress Marlene Dietrich, until curiosity compelled her to invite him in. He signed her to tour in 1965 and again in 1966, which he considered his "greatest coup", and they remained friends until her death in 1992.

In 1966 he tentatively shifted to the dramatic stage, often bringing entire productions from the West End to South Africa. Funding all his own productions, he famously claimed that he produced farce and comedy to subsidise less commercial theatre.

Continuing with the successful business formula of signing overseas box-office attractions, he brought names such as Hermione Gingold from New York for Noël Coward's Fallen Angels and Joan Fontaine for Fredrick Knott's thriller Dial M for Murder. Other names included Barbara Windsor, June Whitfield and Sir Michael Redgrave.

When the word 'gay' was still taboo, Toerien brought The Other Side of the Swamp to the boards. Writer Royce Ryton himself played opposite Eckard Rabe under Graham Armitage's direction. By running for a year, this production broke a South African record.

Writers Ben Travis, Ray Clooney and Alan Ayckbourn became audience favourites, as did Agatha Christie. From the early 1980s, British comedy actor and director Rex Garner became associated with Toerien for many box office successes, including Ray Cooney's Out of Order and It Runs in the Family, Michael Pertwee's Birds of Paradise and Robin Hawdon's rewrite of Marc Camoletti's Don't Dress for Dinner, which saw a 2013 revival in Toerien's own theatre complex to critical acclaim.

In partnership with Shirley Firth, Toerien owned The Intimate, a 235-seater theatre, as well as The Barnato and the Andre Huguenot theatres.

In 1980 he saved an old theatre from demolition and opened The Alhambra in Braamfontein with Peter Shaffer's Amadeus. Refurbishing the old building, he added two more theatres to the complex – the Leonard Rayne, opened on 18 July 1983, (renamed the Rex Garner in 1994) and the Richard Haines Theatres.

In 1988 he purchased the derelict Alvin Cinema in Camps Bay. Together with designer Jan Corewyn, they transformed it with a post modern façade draped with a sculptured curtain, and named it Theatre on the Bay.

In the 1980s, Toerien also brought Sir Cameron Mackintosh's Tom Foolery to South Africa. This association resulted in South Africa receiving many of the phenomenal successes of Macintosh's London musical theatre, including Les Misérables, Cats – which toured Scandinavia, the Far East and Beirut and The Phantom of the Opera – which toured the Far East, ending in Hong Kong. These were followed by The Sleeping Beauty on Ice, Joseph and the Amazing Technicolor Dreamcoat and Jesus Christ Superstar, which was originally banned in South Africa as blasphemous after it opened on Broadway in 1971, and which travelled to Athens in 2007.

With the decentralisation of Johannesburg's CBD, Toerien moved his Alhambra operation to the north of Johannesburg, where he opened the Pieter Toerien's Montecasino Theatre and Studio in the Montecasino complex. Here he runs two theatres – a main theatre with 320 seats and a 160-seater studio.

Lining the walls of Toerien's theatres are photographs of the innumerable actors who have worked for him over the years, as well as posters of past productions such as Sleuth, A Streetcar Named Desire, Equus, Amadeus, Agnes of God, M. Butterfly, Master Class, Private Lives, Stage Struck, Quartermaine's Terms and Side by Side by Sondheim.

The works of such eminent British writers as Noël Coward, Tom Stoppard, Simon Gray and Peter Shaffer have all been mounted in Toerien's theatres.

2007 saw the staging of The Lion King in a new 1900 seater lyric theatre in the Montecasino complex, called the Teatro.

During the period of South Africa's transition he worked extensively with WESTAG Task Group on the Performing Arts sub-committee. In this area of civic responsibility, he also gave of his expertise on the CAPAB board to assist them in their adjustment to become Artscape. He was also on the board of the National Arts Council and the Western Cape Cultural Commission.

== Sources ==
- "Television documentary: To the Edge by Peter Bode", Just the Ticket by Percy Tucker, The Star
