= Angus Buchan =

Evangelist from southern Africa

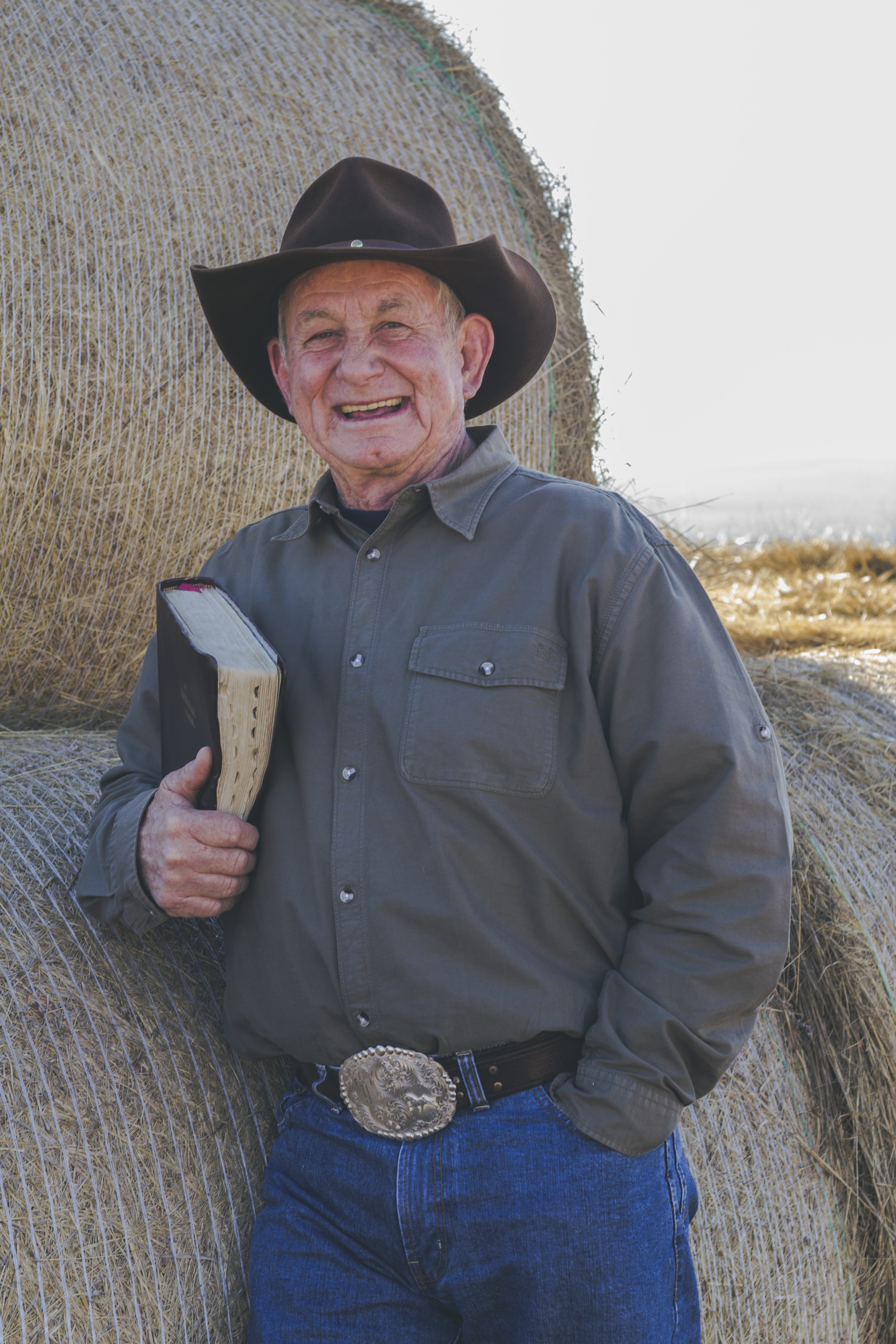
- Buchan at Shalom Farm in Greytown, South Africa
- Born: 25 June 1947 (age 79); Bulawayo, Southern Rhodesia (now Zimbabwe)
- Occupations: Farmer, evangelist
- Spouse: Jill Buchan
- Children: Andrew, Lindi, Robyn, Fergus, Jilly,
- Website: angusbuchan.co.za

Angus Buchan (born 5 August 1947 in Bulawayo) is a Christian author and evangelist based in South Africa.

== Early life ==
Buchan was born in Bulawayo, Southern Rhodesia (now Zimbabwe). The son of immigrants from Scotland, he farmed maize and cattle in Zambia until he moved in 1976 to farm in Greytown, KwaZulu-Natal, South Africa. His wife, Jill, explained their decision to leave Zambia in a 2009 video: "We always agreed that when we had children we'd bring them up ourselves and not send them away. That's actually why we left Zambia. We didn't want to put them on a plane and send them far from home".

== Shalom Ministries ==
In 1980, the Buchans started Shalom Ministries to preach in his local community. Its main purpose later became to go out to preach around Africa. In time, he became a full-time evangelist and so handed over to his sons the day-to-day running of his farm business.

In 1998, he wrote a book about his life, Faith Like Potatoes, which was turned into a film in 2006, with the same title.

Angus Buchan's Ordinary People was a 2012 semi-biographical film about the growth of his ministry since the 1970s and how three fictional characters who attend one of his conferences then have their lives changed.

=== Halalisani Farm School ===
Halalisani Farm School is a Christian farm school not administered by Shalom Ministries, but still supported.

Children's Home

The Children's Home was closed in 2016 due to legislative restrictions.

=== Mighty Men Conference ===
The Mighty Men Conference was organised by Shalom Trust and was an annual gathering of Christian men and boys who camped in the outdoors. The conference's purposes were to worship and to connect with God as well as to grow spiritually. The conference began with only 40 people but grew exponentially. By the sixth conference, in 2009, more than 200,000 attended. In the seventh and final conference the next year, more than 400,000 attended. The main emphasis in his message to men is "Husbands love your wives".

== Current work ==
He now presents a religious show, Family Time, on e.tv on Friday evenings at 9:55 pm, which is mostly filmed from the Shalom farm.

Around 2018 his ministry was known for massive prayer meetings that started with the million person meeting in Bloemfontein on 22 April 2017.

Following a prayer breakfast in Bloemfontein in March 2020 he was one of 67 attendees infected with COVID-19.

== Criticisms ==
- His teachings reinforce male relational power and present a "soft patriarchy", with men assuming leadership roles that demand submission and obedience from women.
- His teachings fail to address the key issue of political or economic reconciliation between black and white South Africans. The fact that his followers are mostly white has been suggested to be a response to the fear of black leadership and the diminishing white control of political and economic power.
- He has made unsubstantiated claims of healing the sick at his services.
- In 2010, Bruce Winship, a Durban businessman and a trustee of Shalom Ministries was quoted as saying: "Not one cent goes to Angus. He lives in the same wattle and daub house that he built on his farm. He drives the same old car. He doesn't even have medical aid". However, in 2014, Winship's relationship with Shalom Ministries came under press scrutiny, with reports revealing that Winship's companies routinely withheld payments with a total of 30,000,000 rand from smaller construction contractors. In response, the Shalom Trust established a 12,000,000-rand fund to pay Winship's creditors.
- Buchan's conservative views on topics such as homosexuality and female equality led to a local council in Scotland banning him from preaching in council-owned property in 2016. A representative of the Scottish Borders LGBT Equality Association said, "Buchan's views that LGBTI people are diseased and can be cured, and that men should dominate women and physically punish children in the family unit are extremely damaging. In my view this crosses the line between freedom of speech and hate speech".
- In 2019 he made a claim that only "Jewish and Afrikaans people" have a "covenant with God", creating a huge backlash, which he publicly apologized for.

== Bibliography ==
- Faith Like Potatoes: The story of a farmer who risked everything for God
- The Booth (eBook): Finding quiet time in the presence of God
- Revival
- The Seed Sower
- Jesus... a Farmer... and Miracles
- Is Jesus Enough?
- Hard-Core Christianity
- Passing the Baton
- A Farmer's Year: Daily truth to change your life
- A Mustard Seed
- Fathers and Sons
- A People Saturated with God
- Grassroots
- Come of Age: The Road to Spiritual Maturity
