= Nunsense =

1985 musical comedy by Dan Goggin

- Music: Dan Goggin
- Lyrics: Dan Goggin
- Book: Dan Goggin
- Productions: 1985 Off-Broadway; Productions worldwide

Nunsense (1985) is a musical comedy with a book, music, and lyrics by Dan Goggin. Originating as a line of greeting cards, Goggin expanded the concept into a cabaret show that ran for 38 weeks, and eventually into a full-length musical. The original Off-Broadway production opened December 12, 1985, running for 3,672 performances and becoming the second-longest-running Off-Broadway show in history. The show has since been adapted for television, starring Rue McClanahan, and has spawned six sequels and three spin-offs.

== History ==
The Nunsense concept originated as a line of greeting cards featuring a nun offering tart quips with a clerical slant. The cards caught on so quickly that Goggin decided to expand the concept into a cabaret show called The Nunsense Story, which opened for a four-day run at Manhattan's Duplex and remained for 38 weeks, encouraging its creator to expand it into a full-length theater production.

The original production of Nunsense, directed by Goggin, opened on December 12, 1985 at the Off-Broadway Cherry Lane Theatre, moving to the Douglas Fairbanks Theater for the majority of its ten-year run. It ran for 3,672 performances, becoming the second-longest running Off-Broadway show in history (after The Fantasticks). By the time it closed, it had become an international phenomenon translated into at least 26 languages with more than 8,000 productions worldwide. It has grossed over $500 million worldwide, and more than 25,000 women have played in Nunsense productions worldwide, including Edie Adams, Maxine Audley, Kaye Ballard, Honor Blackman, Pat Carroll, Peggy Cass, Phyllis Diller, Sally Struthers, Louise Gold, Maggie Fitzhugh and JoAnne Worley. The five-woman production won four Outer Critics Circle Awards, including best Off-Broadway musical, best book and best music. A 1985 London cast recording was made, as well as a 1986 recording with the off-Broadway cast. The show opened on London's West End at the Fortune Theatre in March 1987.

Goggin adapted both Nunsense and Nunsense 2 for television productions with Rue McClanahan as the mother superior. Also starring in this version were Terri White as Sister Mary Hubert, Semina DeLaurentis as Sister Mary Amnesia, Christine Anderson as Sister Robert Anne and Christine Toy as Sister Mary Leo. The show and its sequels are popular choices of community theater and summer stock theatre troupes. In 2004, the "20th Anniversary All-Star Tour" of the show starred Kaye Ballard as Sister Mary Regina, Georgia Engel as Sister Mary Leo, Mimi Hines as Sister Mary Amnesia, Darlene Love as Sister Mary Hubert, and Lee Meriwether as Sister Robert Anne.

== Synopsis ==
Five of the 19 surviving Little Sisters of Hoboken, a one-time missionary order that ran a leper colony on an island south of France, discover that their cook, Sister Julia, Child of God, accidentally killed the other fifty-two residents of the convent with her tainted vichyssoise while they were off playing bingo with a group of Maryknolls. Upon discovering the disaster, Mother Superior had a vision in which she was told to start a greeting card company to raise funds for the burials. The greeting cards were an enormous success and, thinking there was plenty of money, the Reverend Mother bought a VCR and camcorder for the convent, leaving her with no money in the kitty to pay for the last four burials. With the deceased nuns on ice in the deep freeze, they decide to stage a variety show in the Mount Saint Helen's School auditorium to raise the necessary amount. Participating in the project are Mother Superior Mary Regina, a former circus performer who can not resist the spotlight; her competitive but dignified rival, second-in-command Sister Mary Hubert; Sister Robert Anne, a streetwise nun from Brooklyn; Sister Mary Leo, a novice who is determined to be the world's first ballerina nun; and wacky, childlike Sister Mary Amnesia, who lost her memory when a crucifix fell on her head. The entertainment that they present includes solo star turns, madcap dance routines, and an audience quiz.

Naturally, VCRs and camcorders are now no longer such current or expensive devices, so modern presentations of the show tend to substitute newer or more generic terms such as "home entertainment system" or a "plasma TV".

=== Act 1 ===
Mother Superior opens the show by greeting the audience and apologizing for their set constraints (the middle school still has the set for "Grease" up), and the five nuns introduce themselves in the opening number ("Nunsense is Habit-Forming"). The Sisters then explain in song how they got where they are today, originally working in a leper colony near France, but quickly leaving after some of the Sisters developed leprosy themselves ("A Difficult Transition"), and after the song, Sister Amnesia quizzes the audience on it. Sister Mary Leo then performs a dance interpretation of morning at the convent (Benedicite), but starts to get too flamboyant, and is stopped by Sister Mary Hubert, who reminds her "The Biggest Ain't The Best". Reverend Mother comes back on stage, only to be stopped by Sister Robert Anne, who pleads with her to let her sing a solo. Reverend Mother refuses, reminding Robert Anne she is only the understudy, prompting Robert Anne to launch into a song about just that ("Playing Second Fiddle").

Mary Amnesia comes on next and sings a song about what it's like to be a nun, along with a foul-mouthed puppet, Sister Mary Annette ("So You Want To Be A Nun"). Reverend Mother returns and apologizes, but is shocked to hear from Mary Amnesia that the Jersey Board of Health has sent an inspector to the convent just that afternoon. Amnesia runs off crying, and the rest of the Sisters follow, except for Reverend Mother. She tells the audience how she became a nun, but still somewhat misses performing ("Turn Up the Spotlight"). Amnesia, Leo, and Hubert return, and learn that a local Jewish temple has sent them flowers wishing them good luck. They try to use the flowers to remind Amnesia of her past, but all she can get is a quick flashback ("Lilacs"). Robert Anne rushes on stage to give Reverend Mother a bag that she seems troubled about, claiming she found it in one of the girls' bathrooms. Reverend Mother dismisses the rest of the Sisters, and has a look in the bag, the contents of which ultimately get her high - hilariously so. The rest of the Sisters notice, and put on a hastily thrown-together tap number to close the first act and get her off the stage ("Tackle That Temptation").

=== Act 2 ===
Robert Anne opens the second act, overjoyed at being able to finally take a starring role. She sings a slow ballad about how church has changed since she was a little girl ("Growing Up Catholic"). The rest of the nuns rush on afterwards, led by an especially distraught Reverend Mother, who has received a summons from the Board of Health that "We've Got to Clean Out the Freezer". Reverend Mother is calmed down by Mary Hubert, who reminds her that they've got to stick together in times of crisis like this ("Just a Coupl'a Sisters"). Mary Leo and Robert Anne then perform "The Dying Nun Ballet", which the Reverend Mother does not receive well. Amnesia and Hubert return with Sister Julia, Child of God's cookbook and put on a short cooking show segment, which is interrupted by the fact that the book is full of misprints and innuendos. Reverend Mother finally gives in and lets Robert Anne sing her number, "I Just Want to Be a Star".

Amnesia, Robert Anne, and Leo then perform an Andrews Sisters-type number ("The Drive-In"), then show a "homemade convent film display", which is shut off by Reverend Mother after it shows embarrassing clips of her. Amnesia remains on stage after the rest leave, and decides to tell the audience a story about who she would be if she wasn't a nun ("I Could've Gone to Nashville"). Mid-song, everything comes back to her and she remembers her real name - Sister Mary Paul - and her past. She was going to be a famous country singer, but chose the convent instead. She tells the rest of the sisters, who realize that Sister Mary Paul is also the name of the nun who just won the Publisher's Clearing House sweepstakes, and rejoice, thanking God for their good fortune. Sister Hubert closes the show with a rousing gospel number about what it takes to become a saint ("Holier Than Thou").

== Songs ==
Act I

- "Nunsense is Habit-Forming" - Company
- "A Difficult Transition" - Company
- "Benedicite" - Sister Mary Leo
- "The Biggest Ain't the Best" - Sisters Hubert and Leo
- "Playing Second Fiddle" - Sister Robert Anne
- "So You Want To Be a Nun" - Sister Mary Amnesia
- "Turn Up the Spotlight" - Sister Mary Regina
- "Lilacs" - Sisters Regina, Hubert, Leo and Amnesia
- "Tackle That Temptation With a Time Step" - Sister Hubert and Company

Act II

- "Growing Up Catholic" - Sister Robert Anne with Hubert, Leo and Amnesia
- "We've Got To Clean Out the Freezer" - Company
- "Just a Coupl'a Sisters" - Sisters Regina and Hubert
- "Second Fiddle (Reprise)" - Sister Robert Anne
- "I Just Want To Be a Star" - Sister Robert Anne
- "The Drive In" - Sisters Robert Anne, Amnesia and Leo
- "I Could've Gone to Nashville" - Sister Mary Amnesia
- "Gloria in Excelsis Deo" - Sister Mary Regina and Company
- "Holier Than Thou" - Sister Mary Hubert and Company
- "Nunsense Is Habit-Forming (Reprise)" - Company

== Sequels ==
The show's solid success prompted six sequels. Nunsense 2: The Second Coming takes place six weeks after the sisters have staged their first benefit. This time the grateful nuns are presenting a show to thank all the people who supported them in their freshman outing, but chaos erupts when two Franciscans come to claim Sister Mary Amnesia—who has won the Publishers Clearing House Sweepstakes—as one of their own, and the nuns learn a talent scout is in the audience to see them strut their stuff. An audience-participation bingo game is among the show's highlights.

Sister Amnesia's Country Western Nunsense Jamboree, the third installment, is presented as a stop on the promotional tour for the nun's new album, I Could've Gone to Nashville, released after she regained her memory and discovered she really was Sister Mary Paul, a former country singer. The audience participates in a rousing auction.

Nuncrackers: The Nunsense Christmas Musical, fourth in the series, offers a behind-the-scenes look at a holiday television special taped by the sisters for public-access television cable TV in their convent basement studio, and culminates in a wild spoof of Tchaikovsky's classic ballet.

Meshuggah-Nuns!, the fifth installment, finds the sisters on a "Faiths of All Nations" cruise when the on-board cast of Fiddler on the Roof gets seasick, prompting the ship's captain to ask the sisters to put on a show.

Nunsensations: The Nunsense Vegas Revue, sixth in the series, takes the sisters to the Nevada gambling mecca when a parishioner offers them $10,000 to perform in a club. After being convinced "what happens in Vegas, stays in Vegas", the Reverend Mother agrees, and before long the nuns are clad in feathers and sequins and wowing the crowd at the Pump Room in the Mystique Motor Lodge.

Nunset Boulevard, the seventh installment, premiered November 2009 in Chanhassen, Minnesota. The Little Sisters of Hoboken are thrilled by an invitation to sing at the Hollywood Bowl, until they arrive and realize they're booked into the Hollywood Bowl-A-Rama, a bowling alley with a cabaret lounge, rather than the famed venue they anticipated. The sisters must contend with announcements from the bowling alley loudspeakers as well as activity on the lanes while trying to present their latest variety show. Rumors of a new movie musical about Dolores Hart inspire the sisters to audition for roles.

== Spin-offs ==
In addition to the above sequels are three spin-off shows.

Since 1995 a German adaptation under the German title "Non(n)sens" was staged by Benjamin Baumann in the city of Hanau. Within 15 years it attracted more than 120.000 visitors in a total of 544 plays.

Nunsense A-Men, the original show with all the characters portrayed by men in drag, was staged in Brazil as Novicas Rebeldes before transferring to New York City in 1998. It premiered in Buenos Aires as "Suspiros de monja", in 2000.

A new version named Nunsense: The Mega-Musical Version is a remake of the original featuring additional songs, lines, and characters.

Sister Robert Anne's Cabaret Class opened at the Playhouse on the Green in Bridgeport, Connecticut, and was an enormous hit. Deborah Del Mastro starred as Sister Robert Anne, with musical direction by Leo P. Carusone. The "One-Nun-sense Musical" featured songs introduced by Sister Robert Anne from the many previous "Nunsense" shows, but also included two new songs from "Nunset Boulevard". Approaching the audience as a class of students interested in creating their own cabaret act, the premise allowed for much audience interaction, and as in all the "Nunsense" shows, much humor.

In 2008, the Brazilian singer Xuxa (pronounced Shoo Sha) did a Christmas special based on Nunsense, with the name Xuxa E As Noviças (English: Xuxa and the novices). All the songs were translated from Nunsense (except "Amém" (Amen) and "Lua de Cristal"). The story is also based on Nunsense. It had Xuxa, Rosa Marya Colin, Sylvia Massari, Marília Pêra and Fafy Siqueira in cast.

== Home media ==
Cast recordings have been released for each of the show's incarnations.

Acorn Media first released a double-VHS set containing Nunsense and Nunsense 2: The Sequel. Imagine Ent. re-released Nunsense to DVD in 1998, followed by Nunsense 2: The Sequel in 2000; Nunsense 3: The Jamboree in 2003; Nunsensations: The Nunsense Vegas Revue in 2007; and Meshuggah-Nuns! in 2010. SRO released a four-disc DVD collection in June 2013 featuring Nunsense, Nunsense 2, The Jamboree, and Nuncrackers.
