= Dan Goggin (composer) =

American dramatist (born 1943)

- Born: United States
- Occupations: Writer; composer; lyricist; singer
- Known for: Musical theatre
- Notable work: Nunsense

Dan Goggin is an American writer, composer, and lyricist for musical theatre.

== Biography ==
Goggin began his career as a singer in the Broadway production of Luther, which starred Albert Finney. He then toured for five years as a member of the folksinging duo The Saxons, before writing the music for and appearing in the off-Broadway musical Hark!.

Goggin began composing both music and lyrics for revues satirizing current events, trends, and personalities. He later composed incidental music for the short-lived 1976 Broadway production Legend, starring Elizabeth Ashley and F. Murray Abraham, which closed after five performances.

Goggin's early life experiences, including schooling by the Marywood Dominican Sisters and his days as a seminarian, influenced him to create his greatest success. A line of greeting cards featuring a nun offering tart quips caught on so quickly that Goggin decided to expand the concept into a cabaret show called The Nunsense Story, which opened for a four-day run at Manhattan's Duplex and remained for 38 weeks, encouraging him to expand the show into a full-length theater production.

What followed was Nunsense (1985), a commercial success off-Broadway, where it ran for 3,672 performances. By the time it closed, it had become an international phenomenon translated into 21 languages with more than 5,000 productions worldwide. Goggin penned six sequels: Nunsense 2: The Second Coming, Sister Amnesia's Country Western Nunsense Jamboree, Nuncrackers: The Nunsense Christmas Musical, Meshuggah-Nuns!, Nunsensations: The Nunsense Vegas Revue, and Nunset Boulevard. He also adapted the original show for an all-male cast: Nunsense A-Men! played in New York City to rave reviews in 1998.

Goggin also wrote the book, music, and lyrics for A One-Way Ticket To Broadway and Balancing Act.
