= 1998 Super 12 season =

Men's rugby union club competition

1998 Super 12
- Countries: Australia; South Africa; New Zealand
- Tournament format(s): Round-robin and knockout
- Champions: (New Zealand) Canterbury Crusaders (1st title)
- Matches played: 69
- Top point scorer(s): (New Zealand) Andrew Mehrtens (206) (Canterbury Crusaders)
- Top try scorer(s): (New Zealand) Joeli Vidiri (10) (Auckland Blues)

The 1998 Super 12 season was the third season of the Super 12, contested by teams from Australia, New Zealand and South Africa. The season ran from February to May 1998, with each team playing all the others once. At the end of the regular season, the top four teams entered the playoff semi finals, with the first placed team playing the fourth and the second placed team playing the third. The winner of each semi final qualified for the final, which was contested by the Auckland Blues and the Canterbury Crusaders at Eden Park, Auckland. The Canterbury Crusaders won 20–13 to win their first Super 12 title.

== Table ==
Key to colours
Top four teams advance to playoffs

	Team	Pld	W	D	L	PF	PA	PD	BP	Pts
1	(New Zealand) Blues	11	9	0	2	388	296	+92	7	43
2	(New Zealand) Crusaders	11	8	0	3	340	260	+80	9	41
3	(South Africa) Sharks	11	7	0	4	329	263	+66	8	36
4	(New Zealand) Highlanders	11	7	0	4	343	279	+64	6	34
5	(Australia) Reds	11	6	1	4	273	229	+44	5	31
6	(Australia) Waratahs	11	6	1	4	306	276	+30	4	30
7	(New Zealand) Chiefs	11	6	0	5	279	291	−12	5	29
8	(New Zealand) Hurricanes	11	5	0	6	313	342	−29	6	26
9	(South Africa) Stormers	11	3	0	8	248	364	−166	6	18
10	(Australia) Brumbies	11	3	0	8	228	308	−80	5	17
11	(South Africa) Bulls	11	3	0	8	249	306	−57	4	16
12	(South Africa) Cats	11	2	0	9	266	346	−80	7	15

== Results ==
=== Round 1 ===
27 February 1998	Otago Highlanders (New Zealand)	26–19	(Australia) Queensland Reds	Carisbrook, Dunedin
	Try: Simon Culhane; Pen: Simon Culhane (7)		Try: David Wilson, Tim Horan (2); Con: John Eales (2)	Referee: Jonathan Kaplan (South Africa)

27 February 1998	Western Stormers (South Africa)	31–45	(New Zealand) Wellington Hurricanes	Newlands Stadium, Cape Town
	Try: Bob Skinstad, Louis Koen, Percy Montgomery (2); Con: Percy Montgomery (4); Pen: Percy Montgomery		Try: Alex Telea (2), Christian Cullen, Filo Tiatia, Stephen Bachop; Con: Jon Preston (4); Pen: Jon Preston (4)	Attendance: 28,656; Referee: Wayne Erickson (Australia)

28 February 1998	Waikato Chiefs (New Zealand)	25–23	(New Zealand) Canterbury Crusaders	North Harbour Stadium, Albany
	Try: Scott McLeod, Walter Little; Pen: Leon MacDonald (5)		Try: Andrew Mehrtens, James Kerr, Justin Marshall, Mark Mayerhofler; Pen: Andrew Mehrtens	Referee: Steve Walsh (New Zealand)

28 February 1998	Coastal Sharks (South Africa)	24–8	(New Zealand) Auckland Blues	Kings Park Stadium, Durban
	Try: Henry Honiball, Hentie Martens, Jeremy Thomson; Con: Henry Honiball (3); Pen: Henry Honiball		Try: Joeli Vidiri; Pen: Carlos Spencer	Referee: Peter Marshall (Australia)

28 February 1998	Northern Bulls (South Africa)	32–39	(South Africa) Golden Cats	Loftus Versfeld, Pretoria
	Try: André Snyman, Casper Steyn (2), Conrad Breytenbach; Con: Casper Steyn, Franco Smith (2); Pen: Franco Smith (2)		Try: Andre Venter, Jan-Harm van Wyk, Jannie van der Walt (3); Con: MJ Smith (4); Pen: MJ Smith (2)

1 March 1998	Waratahs (Australia)	32–7	(Australia) ACT Brumbies	Sydney Football Stadium, Sydney
	Try: Chris Whitaker (2), Jason Jones-Hughes, John Welborn; Con: Matt Burke (3); Pen: Matt Burke (2)		Try: Stephen Larkham; Con: David Knox

=== Round 2 ===
6 March 1998	ACT Brumbies (Australia)	34–26	(New Zealand) Otago Highlanders	Canberra Stadium, Canberra
	Try: Sam Cordinhley, Stephen Larkham (2), Stirling Mortlock, Troy Jaques; Con: David Knox (3); Drop: Rod Kafer		Try: Matt Carrington, Pita Alatini; Con: Simon Culhane (2); Pen: Simon Culhane (4)	Referee: Tappe Henning (South Africa)

6 March 1998	Canterbury Crusaders (New Zealand)	33–12	(Australia) Waratahs	Jade Stadium, Christchurch
	Try: Angus Gardiner, Justin Marshall, Tabai Matson; Con: Andrew Mehrtens (3); Pen: Andrew Mehrtens (4)		Pen: Matt Burke (4)	Referee: Ian Rogers (South Africa)

6 March 1998	Northern Transvaal (South Africa)	19–37	(New Zealand) Wellington Hurricanes	Loftus Versfeld, Pretoria
	Try: Casper Steyn, Jannie Brooks, Nicky van der Walt; Con: Franco Smith (2)		Try: Finau Maka, George Leaupepe, Mark Allen; Con: Jon Preston (4); Pen: Jon Preston (3)	Referee: Peter Marshall (Australia)

7 March 1998	Golden Cats (South Africa)	37–38	(New Zealand) Auckland Blues	Ellis Park, Johannesburg
	Try: Edrich Lubbe, Hennie le Roux, Jannie van der Walt (2), MJ Smith; Con: Hennie le Roux (2), MJ Smith; Pen: Hennie le Roux, MJ Smith		Try: Penalty try, Eroni Clarke, Joeli Vidiri, Michael Jones, Olo Brown; Con: Adrian Cashmore (2); Pen: Adrian Cashmore (3)	Referee: Wayne Erickson (Australia)

7 March 1998	Coastal Sharks (South Africa)	32–17	(South Africa) Western Stormers	Kings Park Stadium, Durban
	Try: Penalty try, Gary Teichmann (2), Warren Brosnihan; Con: Henry Honiball (3); Pen: Henry Honiball (2)		Try: Dick Muir, Toks van der Linde; Con: Louis Koen (2); Drop: Louis Koen	Referee: Andre Watson (South Africa)

7 March 1998	Queensland Reds (Australia)	25–28	(New Zealand) Waikato Chiefs	Ballymore Stadium, Brisbane
	Try: Damien Smith, Elton Flatley, Tim Horan; Con: Elton Flatley (2); Pen: Elton Flatley (2)		Try: Bruce Reihana, Matt Cooper, Roger Randle; Con: Leon MacDonald, Matt Cooper; Pen: Ian Foster, Matt Cooper	Referee: Johan Meuwesen (South Africa)

=== Round 3 ===
13 March 1998	Waratahs (Australia)	25–10	(South Africa) Golden Cats	Sydney Football Stadium, Sydney
	Try: Graeme Bond, Nathan Grey, Phil Kearns; Con: Manny Edmonds (2); Pen: Manny Edmonds (2)		Try: Victor Matfield; Con: Hennie le Roux; Pen: Hennie le Roux; Drop: Bryan Habana	Referee: Paul Honiss (New Zealand)

13 March 1998	Waikato Chiefs (New Zealand)	19–22	(New Zealand) Wellington Hurricanes	Waikato Stadium, Hamilton
	Try: Mark Robinson, Roger Randle; Pen: Ian Foster, Leon MacDonald (2)		Try: Alex Telea (2), George Leaupepe, Tana Umaga; Con: Jon Preston	Referee: Glenn Wahlstrom (New Zealand)

14 March 1998	Queensland Reds (Australia)	35–9	(New Zealand) Canterbury Crusaders	Ballymore Stadium, Brisbane
	Try: Damien Smith, Jason Little, John Eales, Shane Drahm, Tim Horan; Con: John Eales (5)		Pen: Andrew Mehrtens (3)	Referee: Tappe Henning (South Africa)

14 March 1998	Auckland Blues (New Zealand)	41–22	(New Zealand) Otago Highlanders	Eden Park, Auckland
	Try: Jonah Lomu, Lee Stensness, Mark Carter, Paul Mitchell, Robin Brooke; Con: Adrian Cashmore, Hayden Taylor; Pen: Adrian Cashmore (4)		Try: Brendan Laney; Con: Tony Brown; Pen: Simon Culhane (4), Tony Brown	Referee: Steve Walsh (New Zealand)

14 March 1998	Western Stormers (South Africa)	35–18	(South Africa) Northern Transvaal	Newlands Stadium, Cape Town
	Try: Joggie Viljoen, Johan van Wyk, Percy Montgomery, Pieter Rossouw; Con: Louis Koen (3); Pen: Louis Koen (3)		Try: Grant Esterhuizen (2); Con: Franco Smith; Pen: Franco Smith (2)	Attendance: 25,671; Referee: Ian Rogers (South Africa)

14 March 1998	ACT Brumbies (Australia)	23–41	(South Africa) Coastal Sharks	Canberra Stadium, Canberra
	Try: Adam Magro, Sam Cordingley, Stephen Larkham; Con: David Knox; Pen: David Knox (2)		Try: André Joubert, Gary Teichmann, Kevin Putt, Mornay Visser, Stefan Terblanche, Stephen Brink; Con: Henry Honiball (4); Pen: Henry Honiball	Referee: Steve Walsh (New Zealand)

=== Round 4 ===
20 March 1998	Otago Highlanders (New Zealand)	41–35	(South Africa) Coastal Sharks	Carisbrook, Dunedin
	Try: Isitolo Maka (2), John Leslie, Pailate Fili, Tony Brown; Con: Tony Brown (5); Pen: Tony Brown (2)		Try: André Joubert (2), Gary Teichmann (2), Walter Minnaar; Con: André Joubert (2); Pen: André Joubert (2), Henry Honiball	Referee: Andrew Cole (New Zealand)

21 March 1998	Northern Transvaal (South Africa)	34–19	(Australia) Waratahs	Johann van Riebeeck Stadium, Witbank
	Try: Henry Kemp, Marius Goosen, Franco Smith; Con: Franco Smith (2); Pen: Franco Smith (5)		Try: Michael Brial; Con: Manny Edmonds; Pen: Manny Edmonds (4)	Referee: Paddy O'Brien (New Zealand)

21 March 1998	ACT Brumbies (Australia)	37–3	(South Africa) Golden Cats	Canberra Stadium, Canberra
	Try: Marco Caputo, Mitch Hardy, Sam Cordingley, Stephen Larkham; Con: David Knox (4); Pen: David Knox (3)		Pen: MJ Smith	Referee: Colin Hawke (New Zealand)

21 March 1998	Auckland Blues (New Zealand)	25–23	(New Zealand) Waikato Chiefs	Eden Park, Auckland
	Try: Joeli Vidiri; Con: Adrian Cashmore; Pen: Adrian Cashmore (6)		Try: Glen Marsh, Roger Randle; Con: Matt Cooper (2); Pen: Matt Cooper (3)	Referee: Steve Walsh (New Zealand)

22 March 1998	Wellington Hurricanes (New Zealand)	33–41	(Australia) Queensland Reds	Athletic Park, Wellington
	Try: Christian Cullen, George Leaupepe, Jason O'Halloran, Tana Umaga; Con: Jon Preston (2); Pen: Jon Preston (3)		Try: Jason Little, Shane Drahm (2), Tim Horan, Toutai Kefu; Con: John Eales (5); Pen: John Eales (2)	Referee: Carl Spannenberg (South Africa)

=== Round 5 ===
27 March 1998	Canterbury Crusaders (New Zealand)	24–31	(New Zealand) Auckland Blues	Jade Stadium, Christchurch
	Try: Daryl Gibson, Tabai Matson; Con: Andrew Mehrtens; Pen: Andrew Mehrtens (4)		Try: Caleb Ralph, Jonah Lomu, Michael Jones, Royce Willis; Con: Adrian Cashmore (4); Pen: Adrian Cashmore	Referee: Steve Walsh (New Zealand)

28 March 1998	Western Stormers (South Africa)	35–33	(Australia) Waratahs	Boland Stadium, Wellington, South Africa
	Try: Andrew Aitken, Bob Skinstad (2), Breyton Paulse, James Small; Con: Louis Koen, Percy Montgomery; Pen: Louis Koen, Percy Montgomery		Try: Jason Jones-Hughes, Michael Brial, Semi Taupeaffe; Con: Manny Edmonds (3); Pen: Manny Edmonds (4)	Attendance: 10,000; Referee: Steve Walsh

28 March 1998	Northern Bulls (South Africa)	24–7	(Australia) ACT Brumbies	Bosman Stadium, Brakpan
	Try: Adriaan Richter, Dan van Zyl, Marius Goosen (2); Con: Franco Smith (2)		Try: Patricio Noriega; Con: David Knox	Attendance: 3,661; Referee: Paul Honiss (New Zealand)

28 March 1998	Otago Highlanders (New Zealand)	57–27	(South Africa) Golden Cats	Rugby Park Stadium, Invercargill
	Try: Isitolo Maka (2), Jeff Wilson (2), John Leslie (2), John Kronfeld, Pita Alatini; Con: Tony Brown (4); Pen: Tony Brown (3)		Try: AJ Venter, Chris Badenhorst, Hannes Strydom, Helgard Müller; Con: Jannie de Beer (2); Pen: Jannie de Beer	Referee: Stuart Dickinson (Australia)

29 March 1998	Wellington Hurricanes (New Zealand)	23–39	(South Africa) Coastal Sharks	Arena Manawatu, Palmerston North
	Try: Alama Ieremia, Filo Tiatia, Jason O'Halloran; Con: Jarrod Cunningham; Pen: Christian Cullen		Try: Lawrence Payne, Pieter Muller (2), Stefan Terblanche (3); Con: Henry Honiball (2), Ollie Le Roux; Pen: Henry Honiball	Referee: Scott Young (Australia)

=== Round 6 ===
3 April 1998	Wellington Hurricanes (New Zealand)	30–15	(South Africa) Golden Cats	Yarrow Stadium, New Plymouth
	Try: Doug Howlett, Tana Umaga; Con: David Holwell; Pen: David Holwell (3)		Try: Andre Venter, Wybrand Els; Con: MJ Smith; Pen: MJ Smith

3 April 1998	Western Stormers (South Africa)	34–3	(Australia) ACT Brumbies	Newlands Stadium, Cape Town
	Try: Bob Skinstad, Louis Koen, Percy Montgomery, Robbie Fleck (2); Con: Louis Koen (3); Pen: Louis Koen		Pen: David Knox	Attendance: 35,000; Referee: Colin Hawke (New Zealand)

4 April 1998	Otago Highlanders (New Zealand)	29–11	(New Zealand) Waikato Chiefs	Carisbrook, Dunedin
	Try: Jeff Wilson, Jeremy Stanley, John Leslie, Lio Falaniko; Con: Simon Culhane (3); Pen: Simon Culhane		Try: Scott McLeod; Pen: Matt Cooper (2)	Referee: Paul Honiss (New Zealand)

4 April 1998	Queensland Reds (Australia)	33–18	(New Zealand) Auckland Blues	Ballymore Stadium, Brisbane
	Try: Ben Tune, Shane Drahm, Tim Horan; Con: John Eales (3); Pen: John Eales (4)		Try: Caleb Ralph, Lee Stensness; Con: Adrian Cashmore; Pen: Adrian Cashmore (2)	Referee: Andre Watson (South Africa)

5 April 1998	Canterbury Crusaders (New Zealand)	31–20	(South Africa) Northern Transvaal	Jade Stadium, Christchurch
	Try: Daryl Gibson, Daryl Lilley (2), Norm Berryman; Con: Andrew Mehrtens; Pen: Andrew Mehrtens (2); Drop: Andrew Mehrtens		Try: Jannie Brooks, Joost van der Westhuizen, Franco Smith; Con: Braam van Straaten; Pen: Braam van Straaten	Referee: Stuart Dickinson (Australia)

5 April 1998	Waratahs (Australia)	51–18	(South Africa) Coastal Sharks	Sydney Football Stadium, Sydney
	Try: Matthew Dowling, Michael Brial, Semi Taupeaffe (3), Tiaan Strauss, Viliami Ofahengaue; Con: Manny Edmonds (4), Matthew Dowling; Pen: Manny Edmonds (2)		Try: Gary Teichmann, Ollie Le Roux; Con: André Joubert; Pen: André Joubert (2)	Referee: Paddy O'Brien (New Zealand)

=== Round 7 ===
11 April 1998	Waikato Chiefs (New Zealand)	37–25	(South Africa) Northern Transvaal	Waikato Stadium, Hamilton
	Try: Glen Marsh, Justin Collins, Mark Cooksley, Todd Miller, Troy Flavell; Con: Ian Foster (2), Matt Cooper; Pen: Ian Foster (2)		Try: Danie van Schalkwyk, Derrick Grobbelaar, Joost van der Westhuizen; Con: Franco Smith (2); Pen: Franco Smith (2)	Referee: Andrew Cole (New Zealand)

11 April 1998	Queensland Reds (Australia)	19–14	(South Africa) Western Stormers	Ballymore Stadium, Brisbane
	Try: Damien Smith; Con: Shane Drahm; Pen: John Eales (2), Shane Drahm (2)		Try: Bob Skinstad, Robbie Fleck; Con: Louis Koen (2)	Referee: Colin Hawke (New Zealand)

11 April 1998	Coastal Sharks (South Africa)	30–18	(South Africa) Golden Cats	Kings Park Stadium, Durban
	Try: John Slade, Pieter Muller, Stefan Terblanche; Con: Henry Honiball (3); Pen: Henry Honiball (3)		Try: Andre Venter (2); Con: Jannie de Beer; Pen: Jannie de Beer, Jannie van der Walt	Referee: Tappe Henning (South Africa)

11 April 1998	Canterbury Crusaders (New Zealand)	38–26	(Australia) ACT Brumbies	Fraser Park, Timaru
	Try: Andrew Mehrtens, Daryl Lilley, Mark Mayerhofler, Norm Berryman, Scott Robertson; Con: Andrew Mehrtens (5); Pen: Andrew Mehrtens		Try: Stephen Larkham, Stirling Mortlock, Troy Coker; Con: David Knox; Pen: David Knox (3)	Referee: Andre Watson (South Africa)

13 April 1998	Auckland Blues (New Zealand)	47–25	(Australia) Waratahs	Eden Park, Auckland
	Try: Adrian Cashmore, Andrew Blowers, Carlos Spencer, Joeli Vidiri, Lee Stensness, Ofisa Tonu'u, Xavier Rush; Con: Adrian Cashmore (3); Pen: Adrian Cashmore (2)		Try: Manny Edmonds, Matt Burke, Viliami Ofahengaue; Con: Manny Edmonds (2); Pen: Manny Edmonds (2)	Referee: Jonathan Kaplan (South Africa)

=== Round 8 ===
17 April 1998	Auckland Blues (New Zealand)	34–24	(South Africa) Northern Bulls	Growers Stadium, Pukekohe
	Try: Adrian Cashmore (2), Jonah Lomu, Royce Willis; Con: Adrian Cashmore (4); Pen: Adrian Cashmore (2)		Try: Casper Steyn, Marius Goosen; Con: Braam van Straaten; Pen: Braam van Straaten (4)	Referee: Wayne Erickson (Australia)

18 April 1998	Golden Cats (South Africa)	35–36	(New Zealand) Waikato Chiefs	Vodacom Park, Bloemfontein
	Try: Jannie van der Walt, Werner Swanepoel; Con: Jannie de Beer (2); Pen: Jannie de Beer (7)		Try: Errol Brain, Glen Marsh, Nick Moore, Walter Little (2); Con: Ian Foster (4); Pen: Ian Foster	Referee: Stuart Dickinson (Australia)

18 April 1998	Queensland Reds (Australia)	17–17	(Australia) Waratahs	Ballymore Stadium, Brisbane
	Try: Daniel Herbert; Pen: John Eales (4)		Try: Matt Burke; Pen: Manny Edmonds (4)	Referee: Peter Marshall (Australia)

18 April 1998	Canterbury Crusaders (New Zealand)	37–25	(South Africa) Western Stormers	Jade Stadium, Christchurch
	Try: Kevin Nepia, Tabai Matson, Tony Marsh; Con: Andrew Mehrtens (2); Pen: Andrew Mehrtens (6)		Try: Andrew Aitken, Jopie Adlam, Robbie Fleck; Con: Louis Koen (2); Pen: Louis Koen (2)	Referee: Scott Young (Australia)

19 April 1998	Otago Highlanders (New Zealand)	29–8	(New Zealand) Wellington Hurricanes	Carisbrook, Dunedin
	Try: Byron Kelleher, Lio Falaniko; Con: Tony Brown (2); Pen: Tony Brown (4); Drop: Brendan Laney		Try: Christian Cullen; Pen: David Holwell	Referee: Paul Honiss (New Zealand)

=== Round 9 ===
24 April 1998	ACT Brumbies (Australia)	29–32	(New Zealand) Wellington Hurricanes	Canberra Stadium, Canberra
	Try: Joe Roff (2), Owen Finegan (2); Con: David Knox (3); Pen: David Knox		Try: Christian Cullen, Martin Leslie; Con: Jon Preston (2); Pen: Jon Preston (6)	Referee: Ian Rogers (South Africa)

24 April 1998	Canterbury Crusaders (New Zealand)	40–24	(New Zealand) Otago Highlanders	Jade Stadium, Christchurch
	Try: Andrew Mehrtens, Mark Mayerhofler, Scott Robertson, Tabai Matson; Con: Andrew Mehrtens; Pen: Andrew Mehrtens (3); Drop: Andrew Mehrtens (3)		Try: Isitolo Maka, Pita Alatini, Taine Randell; Con: Tony Brown (3); Pen: Tony Brown	Attendance: 32,000; Referee: Steve Walsh (New Zealand)

25 April 1998	Coastal Sharks (South Africa)	52–18	(New Zealand) Waikato Chiefs	Boet Erasmus Stadium, Port Elizabeth
	Try: Boeta Wessels, Stefan Terblanche (4), Stephen Brink, Walter Minnaar; Con: Boeta Wessels, Henry Honiball (6); Pen: Henry Honiball		Try: Blair Larsen, Glen Osborne; Con: Walter Little; Pen: Matt Cooper (2)	Referee: Andrew Cole (New Zealand)

25 April 1998	Queensland Reds (Australia)	28–15	(South Africa) Northern Transvaal	Ballymore Stadium, Brisbane
	Try: Ben Tune (2), Damien Smith; Con: John Eales (2); Pen: John Eales (3)		Try: Braam van Straaten, Casper Steyn; Con: Braam van Straaten; Pen: Braam van Straaten

26 April 1998	Auckland Blues (New Zealand)	74–28	(South Africa) Western Stormers	Eden Park, Auckland
	Try: Caleb Ralph, Carlos Spencer, Eroni Clarke, Joeli Vidiri (2), Mark Carter (3), Paul Mitchell, Xavier Rush (2); Con: Adrian Cashmore (7), Carlos Spencer; Pen: Adrian Cashmore		Try: Andrew Aitken, Charl Marais, Joggie Viljoen, Jopie Adlam; Con: Louis Koen (4)	Referee: Wayne Erickson (Australia)

=== Round 10 ===
1 May 1998	Wellington Hurricanes (New Zealand)	17–39	(New Zealand) Canterbury Crusaders	McLean Park, Napier
	Try: Alex Telea, Martin Leslie; Con: Jon Preston (2); Pen: Jon Preston		Try: Andrew Mehrtens, Mark Mayerhofler, Norm Berryman, Todd Blackadder; Con: Andrew Mehrtens (2); Pen: Andrew Mehrtens (5)	Referee: Steve Walsh (New Zealand)

1 May 1998	Waratahs (Australia)	23–22	(New Zealand) Otago Highlanders	Sydney Football Stadium, Sydney
	Try: Matt Burke, Michael Brial; Con: Manny Edmonds, Matt Burke; Pen: Manny Edmonds (3)		Try: Jeff Wilson; Con: Simon Culhane; Pen: Simon Culhane (4); Drop: Simon Culhane	Referee: Carl Spannenberg (South Africa)

2 May 1998	Northern Transvaal (South Africa)	12–8	(South Africa) Coastal Sharks	Loftus Versfeld, Pretoria
	Pen: Braam van Straaten (4)		Try: Steve Atherton; Pen: André Joubert

2 May 1998	ACT Brumbies (Australia)	24–27	(New Zealand) Auckland Blues	Canberra Stadium, Canberra
	Try: Joe Roff, Stephen Larkham, Stirling Mortlock; Pen: Stephen Larkham (3)		Try: Penalty try, Joeli Vidiri, Paul Mitchell; Con: Carlos Spencer (3); Pen: Adrian Cashmore (2)	Referee: Andre Watson (South Africa)

2 May 1998	Waikato Chiefs (New Zealand)	26–7	(South Africa) Western Stormers	Rotorua International Stadium, Rotorua
	Try: Scott McLeod (2); Con: Ian Foster (2); Pen: Ian Foster (4)		Try: Penalty try Con: Louis Koen	Referee: Peter Marshall (Australia)

3 May 1998	Golden Cats (South Africa)	16–20	(Australia) Queensland Reds	Ellis Park, Johannesburg
	Try: AJ Venter; Con: Jannie de Beer; Pen: Jannie de Beer (2), Werner Swanepoel		Try: Ben Tune, John Eales, Shane Drahm; Con: John Eales; Pen: John Eales	Referee: Steve Walsh (New Zealand)

=== Round 11 ===
8 May 1998	Waikato Chiefs (New Zealand)	35–15	(Australia) ACT Brumbies	Waikato Stadium, Hamilton
	Try: Bruce Reihana (2), Roger Randle (2); Con: Ian Foster (2), Matt Cooper; Pen: Ian Foster (3)		Try: Josh Birch, Stephen Larkham, Stirling Mortlock	Referee: Tappe Henning (South Africa)

9 May 1998	Golden Cats (South Africa)	25–34	(New Zealand) Canterbury Crusaders	Vodacom Park, Bloemfontein
	Try: Chris Badenhorst, Joe Esterhuysen, Naka Drotské; Con: Jannie de Beer (2); Pen: Jannie de Beer (2)		Try: Aaron Gibson, Daryl Gibson, Mark Mayerhofler, Norm Berryman; Con: Andrew Mehrtens; Pen: Andrew Mehrtens (4)	Attendance: 24,212; Referee: Peter Marshall (Australia)

9 May 1998	Western Stormers (South Africa)	15–36	(New Zealand) Otago Highlanders	Newlands Stadium, Cape Town
	Try: Chester Williams (2); Con: Louis Koen; Pen: Louis Koen		Try: Jeff Wilson (3), Jeremy Stanley (3); Con: Tony Brown (3)	Attendance: 19,512; Referee: Scott Young (Australia)

9 May 1998	Waratahs (Australia)	36–32	(New Zealand) Wellington Hurricanes	Sydney Football Stadium, Sydney
	Try: John Welborn, Matt Burke, Semi Taupeaffe, Viliami Ofahengaue; Con: Matt Burke (2); Pen: Matt Burke (4)		Try: Christian Cullen, Mepi Faoagali; Con: Jon Preston (2); Pen: Jon Preston (6)	Referee: Jonathan Kaplan (South Africa)

10 May 1998	Coastal Sharks (South Africa)	30–20	(Australia) Queensland Reds	Kings Park Stadium, Durban
	Try: André Joubert, Henry Honiball (2), Ollie Le Roux; Con: Henry Honiball (2); Pen: André Joubert, Henry Honiball		Try: Jason Little; Pen: John Eales (5)	Referee: Paddy O'Brien (New Zealand)

=== Round 12 ===
16 May 1998	Golden Cats (South Africa)	41–7	(South Africa) Western Stormers	Ellis Park, Johannesburg
	Try: Chris Badenhorst, Jannie van der Walt (3), Werner Swanepoel (2); Con: Jannie de Beer (4); Pen: Jannie de Beer		Try: Percy Montgomery; Con: Louis Koen	Referee: Andre Watson (South Africa)

16 May 1998	Coastal Sharks (South Africa)	20–32	(New Zealand) Canterbury Crusaders	Kings Park Stadium, Durban
	Try: André Joubert, Gary Teichmann, Ollie Le Roux; Con: André Joubert; Pen: Henry Honiball		Try: Andrew Mehrtens, Mark Hammett, Norm Berryman (2); Con: Andrew Mehrtens (3); Pen: Andrew Mehrtens (2)	Referee: Peter Marshall (Australia)

16 May 1998	ACT Brumbies (Australia)	23–16	(Australia) Queensland Reds	Canberra Stadium, Canberra
	Try: Ipolito Fenukitau, Stirling Mortlock; Con: Stephen Larkham (2); Pen: Stephen Larkham (3)		Try: Shane Drahm; Con: Shane Drahm; Pen: Shane Drahm (3)	Referee: Wayne Erickson (Australia)

16 May 1998	Wellington Hurricanes (New Zealand)	34–45	(New Zealand) Auckland Blues	Athletic Park, Wellington
	Try: Alex Telea, Jason O'Halloran (3), Tana Umaga; Con: Jon Preston (3); Pen: Jon Preston		Try: Eroni Clarke, Joeli Vidiri (2), Jonah Lomu (2), Xavier Rush; Con: Adrian Cashmore (6); Pen: Adrian Cashmore	Referee: Colin Hawke (New Zealand)

16 May 1998	Northern Transvaal (South Africa)	26–31	(New Zealand) Otago Highlanders	Loftus Versfeld, Pretoria
	Try: Braam van Straaten, McNeil Hendricks; Con: Braam van Straaten (2); Pen: Braam van Straaten (4)		Try: Brendan Laney, Jeff Wilson (2), Pita Alatini; Con: Tony Brown; Pen: Tony Brown (3)	Referee: Scott Young (Australia)

15 May 1998	Waikato Chiefs (New Zealand)	21–33	(Australia) Waratahs	North Harbour Stadium, Albany
	Try: Matt Cooper, Roger Randle; Con: Matt Cooper; Pen: Matt Cooper (3)		Try: John Welborn, Matthew Dowling (2); Con: Matt Burke (3); Pen: Matt Burke (4)	Referee: Johan Meuwesen (South Africa)

== Finals ==
=== Semi finals ===
22 May 1998

Auckland Blues (New Zealand)	37–31	(New Zealand) Otago Highlanders
Try: Adrian Cashmore (2), Joeli Vidiri, Lee Stensness; Con: Adrian Cashmore (4); Pen: Adrian Cashmore (3)		Try: Jeff Wilson, Taine Randell, Isitolo Maka; Con: Simon Culhane, Tony Brown; Pen: Simon Culhane (3), Tony Brown

Eden Park, Auckland
Referee: Colin Hawke (New Zealand)

23 May 1998

Canterbury Crusaders (New Zealand)	36–32	(South Africa) Coastal Sharks
Try: Norm Berryman (2), Daryl Lilley, Daryl Gibson; Con: Andrew Mehrtens (2); Pen: Andrew Mehrtens (4)		Try: Ollie le Roux (2), Shaun Payne, Stefan Terblanche, Kevin Putt; Con: André Joubert (2); Pen: André Joubert

Lancaster Park, Christchurch
Attendance: 34,000
Referee: Peter Marshall (Australia)

=== Grand final ===
30 May 1998

Auckland Blues (New Zealand)	13–20	(New Zealand) Canterbury Crusaders
Try: James Christian; Con: Adrian Cashmore; Pen: Adrian Cashmore; Drop: Adrian Cashmore		Try: James Kerr, Norm Maxwell; Con: Andrew Mehrtens (2); Pen: Andrew Mehrtens (2)

Eden Park, Auckland
Referee: Paddy O'Brien (New Zealand)

== Statistics ==
=== Top try-scorers ===
Top 3 try scorers
Pos	Name	Team	Tries
1	Jeff Wilson	Otago Highlanders	10
1	Joeli Vidiri	Auckland Blues	10
1	Stefan Terblanche	Coastal Sharks	10

=== Top points-scorers ===
Top 3 points scorers
Pos	Name	Team	Points
1	Andrew Mehrtens	Canterbury Crusaders	206
2	Adrian Cashmore	Auckland Blues	180
3	Jon Preston	Wellington Hurricanes	112

== Notes and references ==
- McIlraith, M. (2005). "Ten Years of Super 12", Auckland: Hodder Moa. ISBN 1-86971-025-8
