= 1998 Chiefs (Super Rugby) season =

Chiefs
- 1998 season
- Head coach: Ross Cooper
- Captain: Errol Brain
- Stadium: Waikato Stadium, Hamilton; Rotorua International Stadium, Rotorua; North Harbour Stadium, Albany
- Placing: 7th
- Record: Won 6, Lost 5
- Top try scorer: All: Roger Randle (6)
- Top points scorer: All: Ian Foster (56)

1998 was another tough year for the Waikato Chiefs rugby team in the Super 12 tournament, winning 6 of their 11 games and finishing 7th overall on the table. This year the team was coached by Ross Cooper and captained by Errol Brain.

== Standing ==
Pos	Team	Pld	W	D	L	PF	PA	PD	BP	Pts
1	(New Zealand) Blues	11	9	0	2	388	296	+92	7	43
2	(New Zealand) Crusaders	11	8	0	3	340	260	+80	9	41
3	(South Africa) Sharks	11	7	0	4	329	263	+66	8	36
4	(New Zealand) Highlanders	11	7	0	4	343	279	+64	6	34
5	(Australia) Reds	11	6	1	4	273	229	+44	5	31
6	(Australia) Waratahs	11	6	1	4	306	276	+30	4	30
7	(New Zealand) Chiefs	11	6	0	5	279	291	−12	5	29
8	(New Zealand) Hurricanes	11	5	0	6	313	342	−29	6	26
9	(South Africa) Stormers	11	3	0	8	248	364	−166	6	18
10	(Australia) Brumbies	11	3	0	8	228	308	−80	5	17
11	(South Africa) Bulls	11	3	0	8	249	306	−57	4	16
12	(South Africa) Cats	11	2	0	9	266	346	−80	7	15

== Results ==
28 February 1998

Waikato Chiefs (New Zealand)	25–23	(New Zealand) Canterbury Crusaders
Try: McLeod; Little; Pen: MacDonald (5)		Try: Mehrtens; Kerr; Marshall; Mayerhofler; Pen: Mehrtens

North Harbour Stadium, Albany
Referee: Steve Walsh (New Zealand)

7 March 1998

Queensland Reds (Australia)	25–28	(New Zealand) Waikato Chiefs
Try: Smith; Flatley; Horan; Con: Flatley (2); Pen: Flatley (2)		Try: Reihana; Cooper; Randle; Con: MacDonald; Cooper; Pen: Foster; Cooper

Ballymore Stadium, Brisbane
Referee: Johan Meuwesen (South Africa)

13 March 1998

Waikato Chiefs (New Zealand)	19–22	(New Zealand) Wellington Hurricanes
Try: Robinson; Randle; Pen: Foster; MacDonald (2)		Try: Telea (2); Leaupepe; Umaga; Con: Preston

Waikato Stadium, Hamilton
Referee: Glenn Wahlstrom (New Zealand)

21 March 1998

Auckland Blues (New Zealand)	25–23	(New Zealand) Waikato Chiefs
Try: Vidiri; Con: Cashmore; Pen: Cashmore (6)		Try: Marsh; Randle; Con: Cooper (2); Pen: Cooper (3)

Eden Park, Auckland
Referee: Steve Walsh (New Zealand)

4 April 1998

Otago Highlanders (New Zealand)	29–11	(New Zealand) Waikato Chiefs
Try: Wilson; Stanley; Leslie; Falaniko; Con: Culhane (3); Pen: Culhane		Try: McLeod; Pen: Cooper (2)

Carisbrook, Dunedin
Referee: Paul Honiss (New Zealand)

11 April 1998

Waikato Chiefs (New Zealand)	37–25	(South Africa) Northern Transvaal
Try: Marsh; Collins; Cooksley; Miller; Flavell; Con: Foster (2); Cooper; Pen: Foster (2)		Try: Van Schalkwyk; Grobbelaar; Van der Westhuizen; Con: Smith (2); Pen: Smith (2)

Waikato Stadium, Hamilton
Referee: Andrew Cole (New Zealand)

18 April 1998

Golden Cats (South Africa)	35–36	(New Zealand) Waikato Chiefs
Try: Van der Walt; Swanepoel; Con: De Beer (2); Pen: De Beer (7)		Try: Brain; Marsh; Moore; Little (2); Con: Foster (4); Pen: Foster

Vodacom Park, Bloemfontein
Referee: Stuart Dickinson (Australia)

25 April 1998

Coastal Sharks (South Africa)	52–18	(New Zealand) Waikato Chiefs
Try: Wessels; Terblanche (4); Brink; Minnaar; Con: Wessels; Honiball (6); Pen: Honiball		Try: Larsen; Osborne; Con: Little; Pen: Cooper (2)

Boet Erasmus Stadium, Port Elizabeth
Referee: Andrew Cole (New Zealand)

2 May 1998

Waikato Chiefs (New Zealand)	26–7	(South Africa) Western Stormers
Try: McLeod (2); Con: Foster (2); Pen: Foster (4)		Try: Penalty try Con: Koen

Rotorua International Stadium, Rotorua
Referee: Peter Marshall (Australia)

8 May 1998

Waikato Chiefs (New Zealand)	35–15	(Australia) ACT Brumbies
Try: Reihana (2); Randle (2); Con: Foster (2); Cooper; Pen: Foster (3)		Try: Birch; Larkham; Mortlock

Waikato Stadium, Hamilton
Referee: Tappe Henning (South Africa)

15 May 1998

Waikato Chiefs (New Zealand)	21–33	(Australia) Waratahs
Try: Cooper; Randle; Con: Cooper; Pen: Cooper (3)		Try: Welborn; Dowling (2); Con: Burke (3); Pen: Burke (4)

North Harbour Stadium, Albany
Referee: Johan Meuwesen (South Africa)

== Squad ==
The Chiefs squad for the 1998 season was:

1998 Chiefs squad
**Props**: (New Zealand) **Con Barrell**; (New Zealand) Michael Collins; **Hookers**: (Fiji) **Greg Smith**; **Locks**: (New Zealand) **Mark Cooksley**; (New Zealand) **Ian Jones**	**Loose forwards**: (New Zealand) Errol Brain; (New Zealand) **Blair Larsen**; (New Zealand) Glen Marsh; (New Zealand) Justin Collins; (New Zealand) Nick Holten; **Scrum-halves**: (New Zealand) Brett McCormack; **Fly-halves**: (New Zealand) Ian Foster	**Midfield**: (New Zealand) **Scott McLeod**; (New Zealand) **Walter Little**; **Wings**: (New Zealand) **Roger Randle**; (New Zealand) **Bruce Reihana**; **Fullbacks**: (New Zealand) **Leon MacDonald**; (New Zealand) **Glen Osborne**; (New Zealand) Todd Miller
(c) denotes team captain,**Bold** denotes player is internationally capped.
