= James Kerr (rugby union) =

- Full name: James Stuart Kerr
- Born: 9 October 1975 (age 51) Sydney, Australia
- Height: 6 ft 4 in (193 cm)
- Weight: 205 lb (93 kg)
- School: Newington College; Gisborne Boys' High School
- Occupation: School teacher

Rugby union career
- Position: Centre / Wing
Super Rugby
Years	Team	Apps	(Points)
1996	Blues	4	(5)
1997–99	Crusaders	26	(30)
2000	Chiefs	2	(0)
International career
Years	Team	Apps	(Points)
1995–96	New Zealand Colts	8	(50)
1997	New Zealand "A"	1	(0)

James Stuart Kerr (born 9 October 1975) is a New Zealand former professional rugby union player.

Born in Sydney, Kerr underwent his early schooling at Newington College, before moving to New Zealand and attending Gisborne Boys' High School, from where he gained New Zealand Schools representative selection.

Kerr earned NZ Colt, NZ Universities, NZ Maori and NZ "A" honours during his career.

A three-quarter, Kerr scored the winning try for the Crusaders in the 1998 Super 12 final against the Blues. The 80th-minute try broke a 13–13 deadlock and came through an Andrew Mehrtens chip kick, juggled over the try line between Blues Ofisa Tonu'u and Adrian Cashmore, with Kerr gathering the loose ball to score. He had previously played Super 12 rugby for the Blues and later spent a season with the Chiefs.

Kerr is now a schoolteacher in the Bay of Plenty.
