= James Christian (rugby union) =

- Full name: James Blair Christian
- Born: 7 March 1978 (age 48) Truro, England
- Height: 6 ft 2 in (188 cm)
- Weight: 238 lb (108 kg)

Rugby union career
- Position: Hooker
Senior career
Years	Team	Apps	(Points)
1997–02	Auckland	32	(15)
2002–03	Newcastle Falcons	3	(0)
Super Rugby
Years	Team	Apps	(Points)
1998–00	Blues	3	(5)

James Blair Christian (born 7 March 1978) is a New Zealand former professional rugby union player.

A hooker, Christian made his provincial debut for Auckland as an 18-year-old and from 1998 to 2000 played Super 12 rugby with the Blues. He scored the opening try of the 1998 Super 12 final, which they lost to the Crusaders.

Christian, a NZ Colts representative, had a stint with London club Blackheath in 1997–98 and returned to England in 2002–03 to play with the Newcastle Falcons. His time in Newcastle ended when he was hospitalised after taking an accidental knee to the head, causing temporarily paralysis. He never recovered full use of his left arm due to nerve damage to his spine and had to retire from rugby.
