= Lee Stensness =

- Born: 24 December 1970 (age 55) Auckland, New Zealand
- Height: 1.80 m (5 ft 11 in)
- Weight: 90 kg (14 st 2 lb)
- School: Taupo-nui-a-Tia College
- University: Massey University

Rugby union career
- Position: Second five-eighth
Senior career
Years	Team	Apps	(Points)
1998–2001	Toulouse		
Provincial / State sides
Years	Team	Apps	(Points)
1989–92	Manawatu	33	
1993–97, 2002	Auckland	80	
Super Rugby
Years	Team	Apps	(Points)
1996–98	Blues	38	(40)
2002–03	Blues	12	(0)
International career
Years	Team	Apps	(Points)
1993–1997	New Zealand	8	(15)

Lee Stensness (born 24 December 1970) is a former New Zealand rugby union footballer who played for Manawatu, Auckland, the Blues and the All Blacks. He made his debut for the All Blacks in 1993.

== Early career ==
Stensness was born in Auckland, but began his first-class rugby career at Manawatu in 1989 and went on to play 33 matches for them until 1992. Highlights during this time included a 58-24 win over Ireland, and selection for New Zealand Universities team to the World Student Games. Stensness also made several national selections during his time with Manawatu: the Colts, the Divisional XV, New Zealand Universities and in 1991 had the first his many All Black trials. He was in the New Zealand XV side which played England B in 1992.

In 1993 he moved to Auckland and in one of his first games for his new union, an away Ranfurly Shield defence against Horowhenua, he ended up scoring four tries. With Grant Fox still playing, it was hard to get the first five role so Stensness moved to second five eighths.

== All Blacks ==
The All Blacks played poorly against the Lions in the second test of 1993, so Stensness was called in for his All Black debut in the final which was the deciding test. He performed well and set up Frank Bunce with a deft kick-through of the ball, and his subsequent test appearances against Samoa and Ireland were impressive. He had a challenging end of season tour to England and Scotland after suffering an early injury on the tour and he played in only six matches but played well in the end of tour match against the Barbarians. He never seemed to have the full confidence of then All Black coach Laurie Mains. By now Carlos Spencer was well established in Auckland, and Stensness had become a specialist second five, though he occasionally returned to first five. He was at number 10 in the Super 12 semifinal of 1996 when Spencer was injured and for the first part of the 1996 representative programme when Spencer was with the All Blacks in South Africa. John Hart, who had taken over as All Black coach, showed a renewed interest by taking him on the NZ Barbarians' short tour of England at the end of the 1996 season, where they played the English. In 1997 Stensness was recalled to the All Blacks for the first five tests of the season but after the tri-nations against the Springboks in South Africa he was dropped for Alama Ieremia. Stensness never played for the All Blacks again, missing out even on the 36-man side to tour Britain and France.

== After the All Blacks ==
Stensness continued to play for the Blues in the Super 12 until the end of 1998. But midway through the year, before he could play for Auckland in the NPC, he moved to play overseas in France, where he played for the next three years. He played an important role in Toulouse's French Championship win in 2001.

Stensness returned to New Zealand in 2001 after a serious knee injury and after surgery made the 2002 Blues team for the Super 12 and bringing his matches in that competition to 48. He also was part of a championship winning Auckland NPC team, bringing his appearances for the union to 80. But he was only a reserve in the final and now in the veteran stage seemed to lack the dash of some of the younger players. He was given a Blues Super 12 contract for 2003 but only had a minor role in their title win. He has two children, a daughter named Ella who was born on 3 October 1997 and a son named Louis birth date unknown.
