= Hayden Taylor =

- Born: Hayden K Taylor; 6 June 1975 (age 51)
- Height: 1.87 m (6 ft 2 in)
- Weight: 82 kg (12 st 13 lb)

Rugby union career
- Position(s): Centre, Fullback
- Correct as of 22 Oct 2012
Provincial / State sides
Years	Team	Apps	(Points)
1995–2007	Northland	125	(548)
Super Rugby
Years	Team	Apps	(Points)
1998-2001	Blues	12	(32)
- Correct as of 22 Oct 2012

Hayden Taylor (born 6 June 1975) is a retired New Zealand rugby union player, and current team manager of the Northland Taniwha rugby team.

His lengthy career ended in 2007 due to a neck injury.
