= Xavier Rush =

New Zealand rugby player (born 1977)

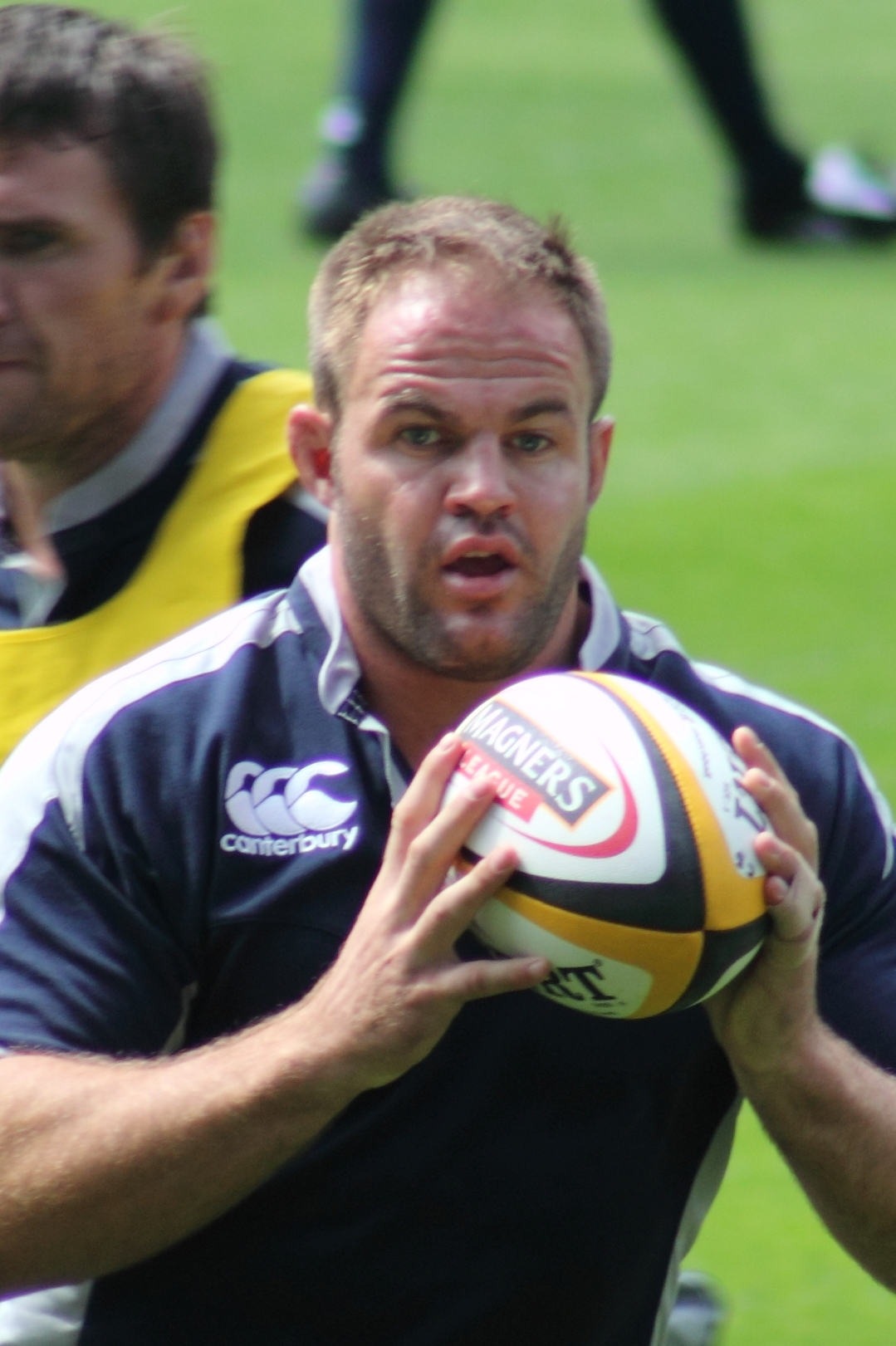
- Born: Xavier Joseph Rush; 13 July 1977 (age 49) Auckland, New Zealand
- Height: 1.87 m (6 ft 1 1/2 in)
- Weight: 112 kg (17 st 9 lb)
- School: Sacred Heart College
- Notable relative: Storm Rush (wife) Annaleah Rush (sister)

Rugby union career
- Position: Number eight
Amateur team(s)
Years	Team	Apps	(Points)
- Auckland Marist
Senior career
Years	Team	Apps	(Points)
2005–2012	Cardiff Blues	130	(105)
- Correct as of 23 August 2011
Provincial / State sides
Years	Team	Apps	(Points)
1997–2005	Auckland	74	((-))
Super Rugby
Years	Team	Apps	(Points)
1997–2005	Blues	86	(70)
International career
Years	Team	Apps	(Points)
1998–2004	New Zealand	8	(0)

Xavier Joseph Rush (born 13 July 1977, in Auckland) is a former New Zealand rugby union footballer. He is a former All Black number eight and second row, and played professional rugby in Wales for Cardiff Blues where he is the former captain.

== Career ==
Rush played domestic rugby with Auckland in the National Provincial Championship and Super 12 side the Blues between 1997 and 2005. He won the NPC Competition with Auckland in 2002 and the Super 12 with the Auckland Blues in 2003. He later captained both of these sides until the end of his contract with New Zealand Rugby where he managed to lift the Ranfurly Shield with Auckland in 2003. During his secondary school years, he maintained a place in the centenary 1st XV, playing, of course, at number 8.

Despite a successful domestic rugby career, Rush never shone at international level, having only eight All Black test caps to his name. He was only 21 when he made his test debut against the Wallabies in 1998. He would later play for the All Blacks during the 2004 Tri-Nations, against England and also the Pacific Islanders.

On 7 February 2010, Rush signed a two-year contract with Ulster Rugby. Having sacked his agent he subsequently entered talks with the Cardiff Blues and Ulster about his future. On 27 May 2010, it was announced that Rush would remain at Cardiff but would have to compensate Ulster to cancel his contract.

Rush retired from playing at the end of the 2011–12 season and took up a coaching role with Cardiff Blues.
