= Manny Edmonds =

Australia international rugby union player

- Full name: Manuel Howard Michael Edmonds
- Born: 12 April 1977 (age 49) Ashburton, New Zealand
- Height: 6 ft 0 in (183 cm)
- Weight: 193 lb (88 kg)
- School: Erindale College, Canberra
- Notable relative: Huia Edmonds (brother)

Rugby union career
- Position: Fly-half
Senior career
| Years | Team | Apps | (Points) |
| 1997–02 | NSW Waratahs | | |
| 2002–07 | USA Perpignan | | |
| 2007–10 | Bayonne | | |
| 2010–11 | USA Perpignan | | |
International career
| Years | Team | Apps | (Points) |
| 1998–01 | Australia | 2 | (23) |

Manuel Howard Michael Edmonds (born 12 April 1977) is an Australian rugby union coach based in France and a former professional player who was capped twice for the Wallabies.

== Personal life ==
Edmonds, nephew of New Zealand Maori player Huia Gordon, was born in Ashburton, New Zealand. He was educated at Erindale College upon moving to Canberra. His younger brother is Wallabies hooker Huia Edmonds.

== Rugby career ==
A fly-half, Edmonds was an Australian representative at schoolboy, under 19 and under 21 level, before making his Super 12 debut for the NSW Waratahs in 1998. His career coincided with that of Stephen Larkham and Edmonds received limited opportunities in a Wallabies jumper. After gaining a place in Australia's 1999 Rugby World Cup qualifying squad, he debuted as fly-half against Tonga in Canberra, where he scored two second half tries and kicked five conversions, for a match total of 20 points. Only David Knox in 1985 had scored more points on Wallabies debut with 21. He was overlooked for the World Cup and received just one more Test cap, against the Springboks at Pretoria in the 2001 Tri Nations Series.

Edmonds left the Waratahs in 2002 to play rugby union in France with USA Perpignan, for which he was a Heineken Cup finalist in 2003. He had a stint playing for Bayonne from 2007 to 2010, before returning to finish his career back at Perpignan. He was head coach of Béziers for the 2015–16 Rugby Pro D2 season.

== See also ==
- List of Australia national rugby union players
