= George Leaupepe =

Samoan rugby union player (born 1975)

- Born: 2 April 1975 (age 51) Apia, Samoa
- Height: 5 ft 11 in (1.80 m)
- Weight: 198 lb (90 kg)

Rugby union career
- Position: Flyhalf
Amateur team(s)
Years	Team	Apps	(Points)
1994	Marist Brothers Old Boys RFC		
1995–1996	Papakura RFC		
1996–1998	Manurewa RFC		
2001	Green Island		
Senior career
Years	Team	Apps	(Points)
2002–2005	Coca-Cola Red Sparks		
Provincial / State sides
Years	Team	Apps	(Points)
1994	Auckland	1	(0)
1995–2000	Counties Manukau	60	(70)
2001	Otago	11	(10)
Super Rugby
Years	Team	Apps	(Points)
1996	Highlanders	7	(5)
1998	Hurricanes	8	(15)
2000	Chiefs	11	(10)
2001	Highlanders		
International career
Years	Team	Apps	(Points)
1995–2005	Samoa	26	(50)

George Edward Leaupepe (born 27 April 1975 in Apia) is a Samoan rugby union player. He plays as a centre.

== Career ==
=== Club career ===
Leaupepe has played for New Zealand amateur clubs Marist Brothers Old Boys, Papakura, Manurewa and Green Island. At the provincial championship level, he played for Auckland, Counties Manukau (reached the finals in 1996 and 1997) and Otago. In 1999 he played his 50th match for Counties Manukau.

In 1996, following the formation of the Super12 in 1996, Leaupepe joined the Highlanders and scored a try on debut against the Blues. Not selected for Super12 in 1997, Leaupepe was drafted to the Hurricanes in 1998, where he played centre in place of an injured Alama Ieremia in six of eleven games. He also played for the Chiefs in 2000 and for the Highlanders in 2001. In 2002 he left to Japan continue his playing career for Coca-Cola Red Sparks.

Leaupepe's home province was Counties Manukau, for whom he helped to consecutive NPC first division finals in 1996 and 1997. He continued with Counties, for another three years, bringing up his 50th game for the union in 1999.

=== International career ===
George Leaupepe scored a hat trick of tries in his first game of international rugby in his first year out of school for Western Samoa against the Victorian state side. He played 36 games for Western Samoa, including 13 tests, with six test tries. His first official test match was 13 April 1995 against South Africa in Johannesburg. In total, he played 26 test matches during his career and scored 50 points thanks to 10 tries. His last test cap was on 11 June 2005 in Sydney against Australia. Taking part at the 1995 and 1999 World Cups, he played five matches at the tournaments and scored one try.

Other representative teams include North Island U16 in 1991, New Zealand U17 in 1992, and New Zealand Secondary Schools in 1993.

He ended his playing career after several injuries that led to pinched nerves in the neck and chronic pain in the left arm; as well due to the professionalization of rugby, which resulted in serious financial losses – Leaupepe, as part of a number of players, publicly accused the New Zealand Rugby Union of insufficient support for those rugby players who received professional status.

== Personal life ==
After his playing career, Leaupepe worked as a truck driver. He is married and has a daughter. In 2016 he was fined NZ $1,550 for possession of cannabis.
