= Scott Robertson (rugby union) =

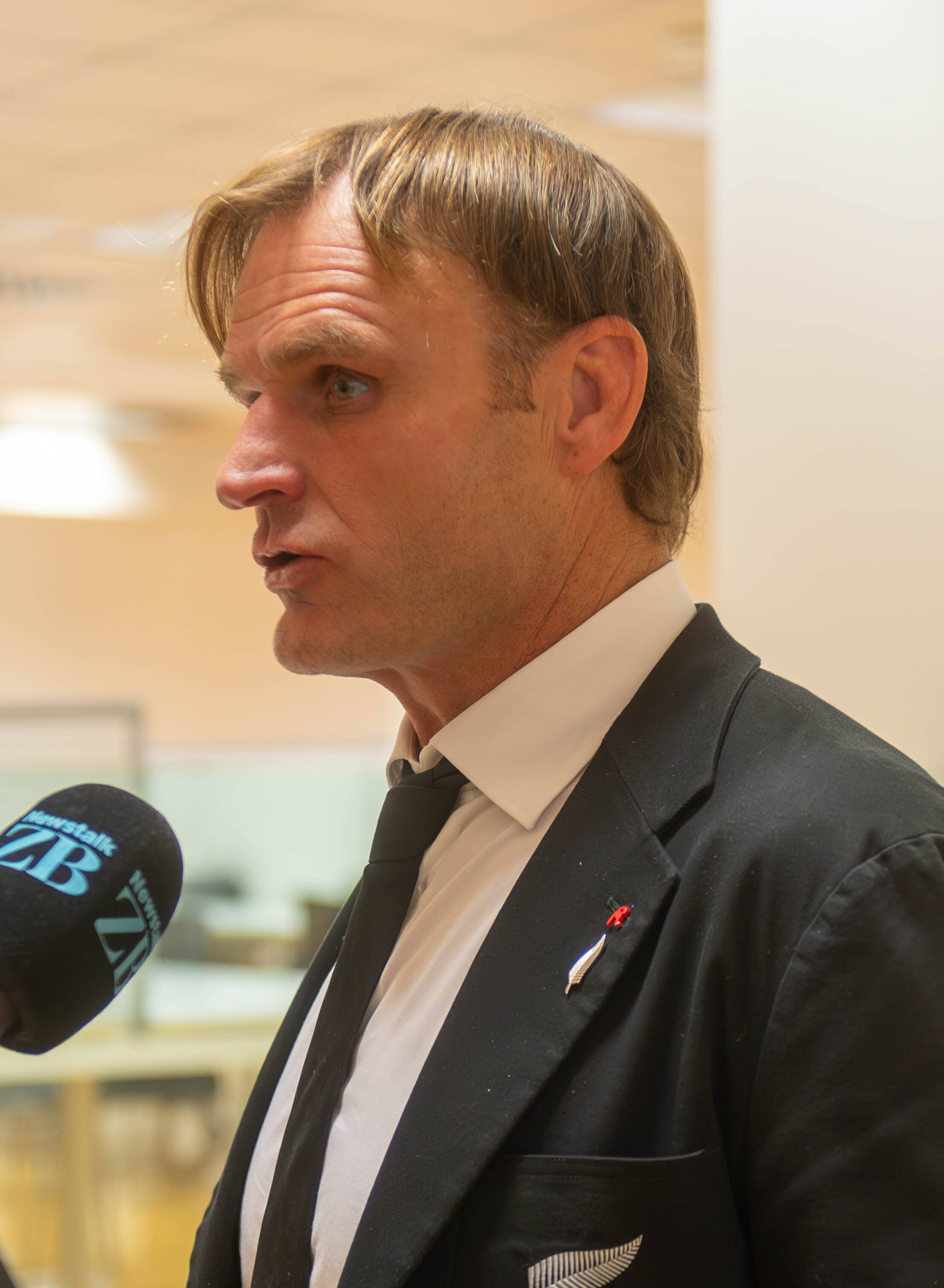
- Robertson in 2024
- Born: Scott Maurice Robertson; 21 August 1974 (age 52) Tauranga, New Zealand
- Height: 1.9 m (6 ft 3 in)
- Weight: 109 kg (17 st 2 lb; 240 lb)
- School: Mount Maunganui College

Rugby union career
- Position(s): Number 8, Flanker
Senior career
Years	Team	Apps	(Points)
?	Ards		
?	Ayr		
2003–2006	Perpignan	54	(27)
2006–2007	Ricoh Black Rams		
- Correct as of 31 May 2006
Provincial / State sides
Years	Team	Apps	(Points)
1995	Bay of Plenty	16	
1996–2003	Canterbury	69	
Super Rugby
Years	Team	Apps	(Points)
1996–2003	Crusaders	86	(80)
- Correct as of 31 July 2003
International career
Years	Team	Apps	(Points)
1998–2002	New Zealand	23	(20)
- Correct as of 31 August 2002
Coaching career
- Years: Team
- 2008–2013: Canterbury (assistant)
- 2012–2013: Brazil
- 2013–2016: Canterbury
- 2015–2016: New Zealand U20
- 2017–2023: Crusaders
- 2022: Barbarians
- 2024–2026: New Zealand

Scott Maurice Robertson (born 21 August 1974) is a New Zealand former rugby union coach and player. Nicknamed "Razor", he played as a flanker for Bay of Plenty, Perpignan, Canterbury and the Crusaders. He won 23 international caps for New Zealand between 1998 and 2002.

He was the head coach of the New Zealand U20s team (2015–2016), the Canterbury ITM Cup team (2013–2016), the Crusaders in Super Rugby (2017–2023), and the New Zealand national team (2024–2026).

As Crusaders coach, he won all seven finals, and achieved a record of 98 wins, 17 losses and 2 draws out of 117 games, making him the most successful Super Rugby coach since the competition began.

== Playing career ==
Robertson grew up in Tauranga and attended Mount Maunganui College.

After college, Robertson moved to Europe, where he played for clubs including Ards in Northern Ireland and Ayr in Scotland, as a flanker.

He played for Bay of Plenty. In 1996 he moved to Canterbury to play for the Crusaders in the first year of the Super 12 competition. After leaving the Crusaders, he went on to play for Perpignan (France). He eventually moved to Japan where he played for the Ricoh Black Rams, before retiring in 2007.

== Coaching career ==
After retiring from playing, Robertson became the head coach at Sumner Rugby Club in Christchurch, New Zealand. In 2004 he was active in establishing an under-19 team at Sumner.

After working as the assistant coach of Canterbury for five years under head coaches Rob Penney (2008–2011) and Tabai Matson (2012), Robertson was appointed Canterbury's head coach in 2013, when they won the Final in the Premiership Division of the ITM Cup. Under his guidance, Canterbury won the competition again in 2015. Robertson was also appointed as head coach of the Brazil national rugby union team for the 2012 and 2013 seasons, as part of a partnership between the Brazilian Rugby Union and the Crusaders.

In 2014, the New Zealand Rugby Union appointed Robertson head coach of the New Zealand Under-20 team, which subsequently won the 2015 World Rugby Under 20 Championship in Italy.

Robertson coached the New Zealand Under-20s in the 2016 World Rugby Under 20 Championship in Manchester, where they failed to make the play-offs.

In June 2016, Robertson was appointed head coach for the Crusaders for the 2017–2019 Super Rugby seasons. During the 2017 season Robertson captured a Super Rugby title with a 25–17 victory over the Lions, becoming only the second first-year coach to win a championship after Dave Rennie in 2012 with conference rivals the Chiefs. On 4 August 2018 he achieved a second straight Super Rugby title with his Crusaders team again defeating the Lions 37–18, again following in the footsteps of Rennie being the second rookie coach to win 2 titles in 2 seasons. In winning the Crusaders' third successive title, Robertson became the first "rookie" Super Rugby coach to win 3 successive titles in their first three seasons as a head coach. The last time a team won three titles in a row was the Crusaders as well between 1998 & 2000, where Wayne Smith led them to two championships before taking up a role with the All Blacks, Robbie Deans would then claim the third title in 2000 beginning one of the most successful periods in the franchise's history.

In 2020, and 2021 Robertson coached the Crusaders to two successful Super Rugby Aotearoa championships. These were both considered a soft-competition on the Super Level due to the pandemic and only playing 5 New Zealand teams, with many of the teams suffering key player losses early on. Since becoming head coach of the Crusaders, the only competition he hasn't won was the 2021 Super Rugby Trans-Tasman add-on, and despite earning 5 wins from 5 games, the Crusaders only ranked third (based on points difference), and missed the final. Following on from the successful Super Rugby Aotearoa campaigns, Robertson again coached the Crusaders to a championship, this time in the maiden Super Rugby Pacific Format in 2022. On 24 June 2023 he coached the Crusaders to a 7th consecutive title with a 20–25 win over the Chiefs, in Hamilton.

Robertson is known for his post victory match break dancing routine

In March 2023, it was announced that he would take over from Ian Foster as head coach of New Zealand from the start of 2024. Though his first All Blacks fixtures as head coach did not occur until 2024, his role as head coach began on 1 November 2023, after the conclusion of the 2023 Rugby World Cup tournament.

On 15 January 2026 New Zealand Rugby (NZR) announced that Robertson had immediately departed as coach of the team following an end-of-season review. NZR issued a statement that read: "Scott Robertson has departed his role as head coach of the All Blacks following the completion of the 2025 end-of-season review. A process will commence immediately to recruit a new head coach." Robertson also issued a statement: "Coaching the All Blacks has been the honour of my life. I am incredibly proud of what this team has achieved and of the progress we have made. We have brought through a talented group of young players, strengthened the depth across the squad and set solid foundations for the years ahead. I have therefore reached an agreement with New Zealand Rugby to end my contract early so a new coaching group has the time it needs to prepare and take the team into the next World Cup. As you can imagine, I am gutted by this outcome. I care deeply about this team. Given the sensitivity of this situation, I will not be making any further comment."

== Media work ==
Robertson was a guest commentator for the 2017 British & Irish Lions tour series.

Sporting positions
Preceded by Ian Foster	All Blacks coach 2024–2026	Succeeded by Dave Rennie
