= Shane Drahm =

Australian rugby union player (born 1977)

- Born: 29 August 1977 (age 49) Brisbane, Australia
- Height: 5 ft 8 in (1.73 m)
- Weight: 13 st 5 lb (85 kg)

Rugby union career
- Position(s): Fly-half, Fullback
- Current team: Kubota Spears
Senior career
| Years | Team | Apps | (Points) |
| 1997–2001 | Queensland Reds | 49 | (151) |
| 2001–2003 | Bristol Shoguns | 21 | (255) |
| 2003–2005 | Northampton Saints | 33 | (423) |
| 2005–2008 | Worcester Warriors | 70 | (639) |
| 2008–2011 | Kubota Spears | 9 | (58) |
- Correct as of 1 December 2008
International career
| Years | Team | Apps | (Points) |
| 2006 | England | 2 | (17) |
- Correct as of 5 January 2008
National sevens team
| Years | Team | | Comps |
| 1997–2000 | Australia 7s | | |
Coaching career
- Years: Team
- 2014: GPS Premier Grade

Shane Drahm (born 29 August 1977) is an Australian former rugby union player of Aboriginal descent. His usual positions were fly-half or halfback. Drahm played for Queensland in Super Rugby and Australia in rugby sevens, but went on to represent England in test rugby and played most of his professional rugby career in that country. He is the current head coach of the First XV at Brisbane Boys College.

== Rugby career ==
Drahm made his Super Rugby debut in 1997 for the Queensland Reds. He played four seasons in Brisbane before moving to England in 2001, playing for Bristol then Northampton. He joined Worcester Warriors in the summer of 2005, and was an integral part of the team. He racked up a number of kicking records in the Guinness Premiership. Drahm qualified to represent England on residency grounds and was capped twice in 2006.

Drahm moved to Japan in 2008 and played the last three seasons of his career with Kubota Spears. He returned to Brisbane in 2011.

== After rugby ==
Drahm worked briefly in sports management before taking on assistant coaching positions in Premier Rugby; firstly at Brothers and then the GPS club in Brisbane. He went on to become the interim head coach of the GPS Premier Grade team during the 2014 season

Drahm has also coached schoolboy rugby at Nudgee College and Brisbane Boys College.

He was the director of the Aboriginal and Torres Strait Islander Studies Unit at the University of Queensland in 2015. Drahm plays golf at Keperra Country Golf Club in Queensland and is a scratch golfer under the GA handicap system.
