= Errol Brain =

- Born: Errol Fraser Brain; 21 July 1968 (age 58)
- Height: 6 ft 3 in (1.91 m)
- Weight: 117 kg (258 lb)

Rugby union career
- Position: No. 8
Provincial / State sides
Years	Team	Apps	(Points)
- Counties Manukau
Super Rugby
Years	Team	Apps	(Points)
1996	Blues	4	(5)
1997–98	Chiefs		
International career
Years	Team	Apps	(Points)
1989–98	New Zealand Māori		
Coaching career
- Years: Team
- 2010–13: Portugal

Errol Fraser Brain (born 21 July 1968) is a former New Zealand rugby union player and a current coach. He played as back-row/number 8.

Brain had more than 100 caps for Counties Manukau. He played for Auckland Blues (1996) and Waikato Chiefs (1997/98), in New Zealand, and Valence d'Agen (1993), in France. He moved to Toyota Motor Company, in Japan, where he played from 1999 to 2002.

Brain played for New Zealand Māori, from 1989 to 1998, and was also their captain.

In September 2010, he took charge as coach of Portugal, with a contract for three years. He started well, performing strongly, but his results later disappointed. He left in late March 2013 when his contract expired, with a mixed legacy of results. After returning to New Zealand, Brain was travelling back and forth on and off to Japan, where he coached. However, his family's final decision was to not move to Japan but to buy a business and settle down in Tauranga. Errol and his wife Tracy bought TDDA (the drug detection agency) and soon started buying businesses around the bay.

Sporting positions
Preceded by Tomaz Morais	Portugal National Rugby Union Coach; 2010–2013	Succeeded by Frederico Sousa
Awards
Preceded by Robin Brooke	Tom French Memorial; Māori rugby union player of the year 1996	Succeeded by Mark Mayerhofler
