= Ian Foster (rugby union) =

NZ rugby union player & coach

Ian Foster CNZM
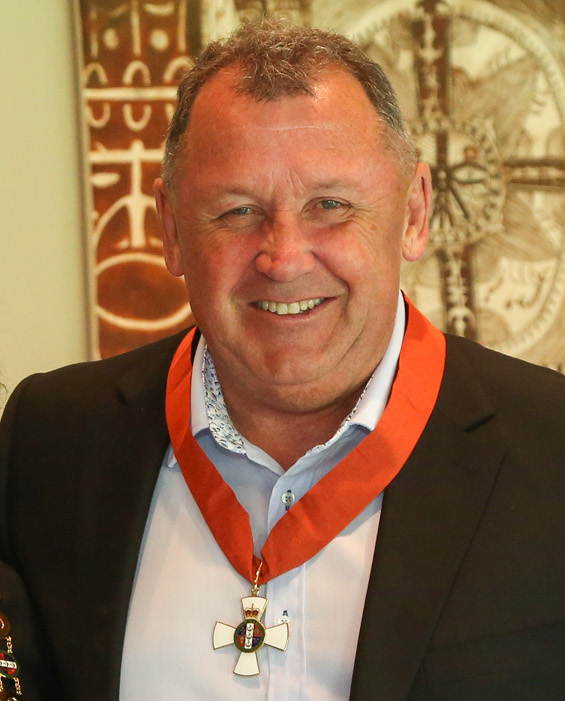
- Foster in 2025
- Full name: Ian Douglas Foster
- Born: 1 May 1965 (age 61) Putāruru, New Zealand
- Height: 1.80 m (5 ft 11 in)
- School: The Taieri High School; Forest View High School

Rugby union career
- Position: First five-eighth
Senior career
| Years | Team | Apps | (Points) |
| 1985–1998 | Waikato | 148 | (322) |
| 1996–1998 | Chiefs | 26 | (167) |
- Correct as of 14 May 2023
Coaching career
- Years: Team
- 2002–2003: Waikato
- 2004–2011: Chiefs
- 2005–2007: Junior All Blacks
- 2012–2019: New Zealand (Assistant)
- 2020–2023: New Zealand
- 2024–2026: Toyota Verblitz (Assistant/Co-coach)
- 2025: ANZAC XV (assistant)
- 2026–: Toyota Verblitz
- Correct as of 1 September 2026

Ian Douglas Foster CNZM (born 1 May 1965) is a New Zealand professional rugby union coach and former player. He coached New Zealand to the final of the 2023 Rugby World Cup, where they lost to South Africa.

He played as a first five-eighth for a number of New Zealand clubs, namely Waikato and the Chiefs. Foster started his coaching career with Waikato. He also contributed to New Zealand's victory in the 2015 Rugby World Cup as an assistant coach. In 2025 Foster was appointed a Companion of the New Zealand Order of Merit for services to rugby.

== Playing career ==
During Foster's playing career he made 148 appearances for Waikato, a union record. He also played 28 games for the Chiefs.

Foster also played for the NZRFU President’s XV in 1995.

== Coaching career ==
=== Waikato ===
Foster was the head coach of Waikato for 2002 and 2003. In 2002, Waikato finished first after the round robin stage with eight wins from nine games, but ultimately lost the final to Auckland 28–40.

In the 2003 season Waikato were second behind Otago after the round robin standings with six wins from nine games. They then lost their home semi-final 29–30 to Wellington.

Overall, Foster's coaching record with Waikato was 15 wins from 21 games.

=== Chiefs ===
In 2004, Foster took over as head coach of the Waikato-based Super Rugby team the Chiefs, with the following results:

- In the 2004 Super 12 season, 7 wins from 11 games with 274 points for and 251 against. Placed 4th on the table. The Chiefs lost their semifinal 17–32 to the Brumbies, the eventual champions, at Canberra Stadium.
- 2005, 5 wins and a draw from 11 games with 272 points for and 250 against. Placed 6th.
- 2006, 7 wins and a draw from 13 games with 325 points for and 298 against. Placed 7th.
- 2007, 7 wins and a draw from 13 games with 373 points for and 321 against. Placed 7th.
- 2008, 7 wins from 13 games with 348 points for and 349 against. Placed 7th.
- 2009, 9 wins from 13 games with 338 points for and 236 against. Placed 2nd. The Chiefs beat the Hurricanes 14–10 in a home semi-final and then lost 17–61 to the Bulls in the final at Loftus Versfeld Stadium, Pretoria.
- 2010, 4 wins and a draw from 13 games with 340 points for and 418 against. Placed 10th.
- 2011, 6 wins and a draw from 18 games with 332 points for and 348 against. Placed 5th in the New Zealand conference and 10th overall.

Under Foster's coaching, the Chiefs made the Super Rugby finals in 2004 and the final in 2009 and had a 50% win ratio.

=== All Blacks ===
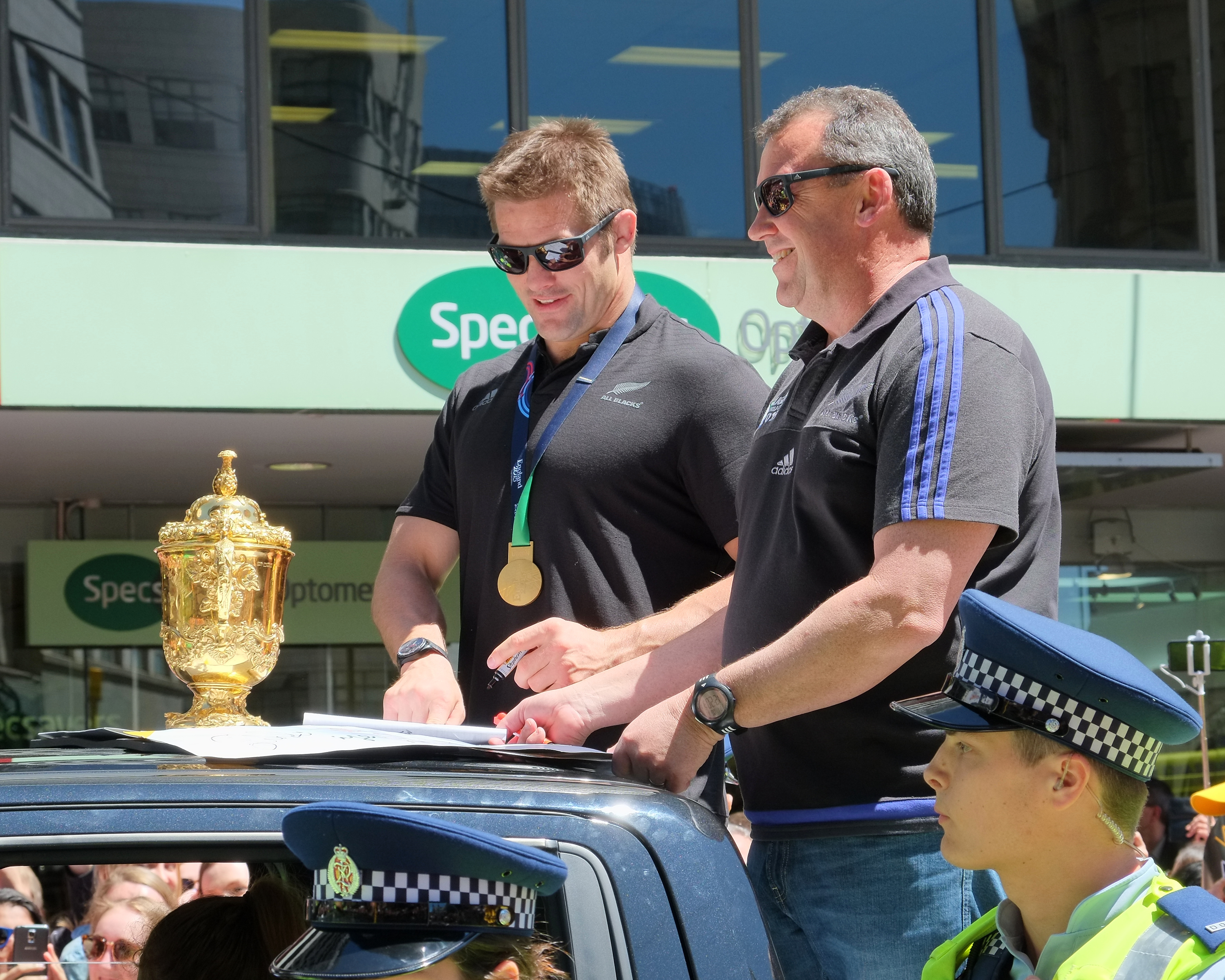
Foster (right) with Richie McCaw during the 2015 Rugby World Cup victory parade

In 2011, Foster became an assistant coach and selector for the All Blacks under newly-appointed head coach Steve Hansen, a position which he held until after the 2019 Rugby World Cup. During his time as assistant coach, the All Blacks won 93 of 108 tests (losing in just ten), and won the 2015 Rugby World Cup.

In December 2019, Foster was named the new head coach of the All Blacks, replacing Hansen, alongside assistants John Plumtree, Greg Feek, and Scott McLeod. He also announced Sam Cane as the new All Blacks captain.

In 2022, Foster came under increasing pressure after the All Blacks were defeated in a test series for the first time by Ireland. Foster's assistants Plumtree and Brad Mooar were sacked and replaced by Jason Ryan, with Foster taking on the backs coaching role and former Ireland coach Joe Schmidt joining as an advisor. Following a disappointing 26–10 loss to South Africa, the All Blacks losing run stood at 5 losses in their last 6 tests. The All Blacks bounced back with a comprehensive victory at Ellis Park against South Africa, which might have saved Foster's job. After a review, and support from many of the All Blacks squad, New Zealand Rugby opted to back Foster until the 2023 World Cup. Two weeks later, the All Blacks lost to Argentina in Christchurch, the first time Argentina had defeated the All Blacks in New Zealand.

In March 2023, it was announced that Scott Robertson would be taking over the All Blacks coaching position in 2024. In August, just weeks before the 2023 World Cup, Foster's All Blacks suffered the biggest test defeat at the time in All Blacks history, losing 35–7 (a 28 point margin) against South Africa. During the Rugby World Cup, Foster's All Blacks upset the number one ranked Ireland in the quarter-final, winning 28–24. Foster's All Blacks went on to advance to the final, losing 11–12 to South Africa.

=== Toyota Verblitz ===
Since 2024, Foster has been designated as the assistant and co-coach of Toyota Verblitz in the Japan Rugby League One under the tutelage of Steve Hansen. Following the departure of Hansen in June 2026, Foster was appointed head coach of the club ahead of their 2026–27 season.

== Personal life ==
Foster's daughter Michaela Foster is a professional soccer player.

== Honours ==
- Bledisloe Cup
  - Winners: 2020, 2021, 2022, 2023
- Freedom Cup
  - Winners: 2021, 2022, 2023
- The Rugby Championship
  - Winners: 2020, 2021, 2022, 2023

Sporting positions
| Preceded by Steve Hansen | All Blacks coach 2019–2023 | Succeeded by Scott Robertson |
