= Glen Marsh =

Japan international rugby union player

- Born: 12 August 1972 (age 54) Rotorua, New Zealand
- Height: 6 ft 2 in (188 cm)
- Weight: 224 lb (102 kg)
- Notable relative: Tony Marsh (brother)

Rugby union career
- Position: Flanker
Provincial / State sides
Years	Team	Apps	(Points)
1996–00	Counties Manukau	40	(35)
Super Rugby
Years	Team	Apps	(Points)
1998–00	Chiefs	30	(30)
International career
Years	Team	Apps	(Points)
2007	Japan	3	(0)

Glen Marsh (born 12 August 1972) is a New Zealand-born former Japan rugby union international.

== Biography ==
Marsh was born in Rotorua and is the identical twin brother of France international Tony Marsh.

A flanker, Marsh was a Counties Manukau player and had three Super 12 seasons with the Chiefs. He made representative appearances for New Zealand A and NZ Maori.

Marsh left New Zealand in 2001 to ply his trade in Japanese professional rugby with NEC Green Rockets.

In 2007, Marsh made his way into the John Kirwan-coached Japan national team and was capped three times, until it was discovered that his previous New Zealand A matches made him ineligible, putting him out of World Cup contention.

== See also ==
- List of Japan national rugby union players
