= Lio Falaniko =

Samoan rugby union footballer and coach, and boxer

- Born: 17 September 1970 (age 56) Apia, Samoa
- Height: 6 ft 5 in (1.96 m)
- Weight: 264 lb (120 kg)

Rugby union career
- Position: Lock
Amateur team(s)
| Years | Team | Apps | (Points) |
| 1994-1998 | Alhambra Union | | |
| 1999 | Marist | | |
Senior career
| Years | Team | Apps | (Points) |
| 1999 | Bègles-Bordeaux | | |
| 2000-2005 | Kintetsu Liners | | |
Provincial / State sides
| Years | Team | Apps | (Points) |
| 1990 | Wellington U21 | | |
| 1994-1998 | Otago | 36 | (20) |
| 1998 | Southland | 6 | (0) |
| 1999 | North Harbour | 6 | (0) |
Super Rugby
| Years | Team | Apps | (Points) |
| 1996–98 | Otago Highlanders | 24 | (25) |
| 1999 | Wellington Hurricanes | 5 | (0) |
International career
| Years | Team | Apps | (Points) |
| 1990-1999 | Samoa | 21 | (10) |

Filiga Lio Falaniko (born Apia, 17 September 1970) is a Samoan former rugby union player and boxer. He plays as a lock. Currently, he works as personal trainer.

== Career ==
His international debut in 1991, against Tonga, at Apia, on 17 June 1990. Despite missing that year's World Cup through injury he was a regular for the Samoans throughout the 1990s, playing in both the 1995 and 1999 World Cups - scoring a memorable try against Wales in Samoa's 38–31 win at the then all-new Millennium Stadium in Cardiff.

Ranging lock Falaniko joined the Hurricanes for one season in 1999 from the Highlanders, where he had played 24 super 12 games between 1996 and 1998. Falaniko was used alongside Dion Waller, Mark Cooksley and Inoke Afeaki in the locking role for the Hurricanes, winning five caps, and making four starts against the Cats, Sharks, Blues, and finally his old team the Highlanders.

Vastly experienced at provincial level, Falaniko played a number of times for Otago, spent a season with Southland prior to his Super 12 stint in Wellington and also for North Harbour in 1999. Additionally Falaniko was an international volleyball representative and spent several years as a Les Mills Gyms fitness trainer. He took his personal trainer expertise to Perth, where he now resides and also coaches at club level.

== Boxing career ==
Between 2005 and 2011, Falaniko undertook a boxing career, going undefeated in 10 heavyweight professional boxing bouts in New Zealand.
