= Alex Telea =

NZ-Samoan rugby union player (born 1972)

- Born: 25 March 1972 (age 54) Lower Hutt, New Zealand
- Height: 5 ft 10 in (178 cm)
- Weight: 198 lb (90 kg)

Rugby union career
- Position: Wing
Provincial / State sides
Years	Team	Apps	(Points)
1994–96	Wellington	21	(60)
2000	Southland	11	(25)
2005	Manawatu	6	(10)
2006	Horowhenua-Kapiti	8	(10)
Super Rugby
Years	Team	Apps	(Points)
1996–99	Hurricanes	31	(70)
International career
Years	Team	Apps	(Points)
1995–96	Western Samoa	5	(15)

Alex Telea (born 25 March 1972) is a New Zealand-born Samoan former rugby union international.

A winger from Lower Hutt, Telea won NZ Colts selection in 1993 and the following year began in provincial rugby with Wellington. He played with the Hurricanes from 1996 to 1999, scoring 14 tries from 31 appearances, before succumbing to a knee injury. Once he recovered, Telea had an overseas stint with Coventry and played provincial rugby until 2006.

Telea was capped five times for Western Samoa, debuting against Scotland at Murrayfield in 1995. He faced the All Blacks in a match at Napier the following year and scored Western Samoa's only try during the first-half.

== See also ==
- List of Samoa national rugby union players
