= Carlos Spencer =

New Zealand rugby union player and coach (born 1975)

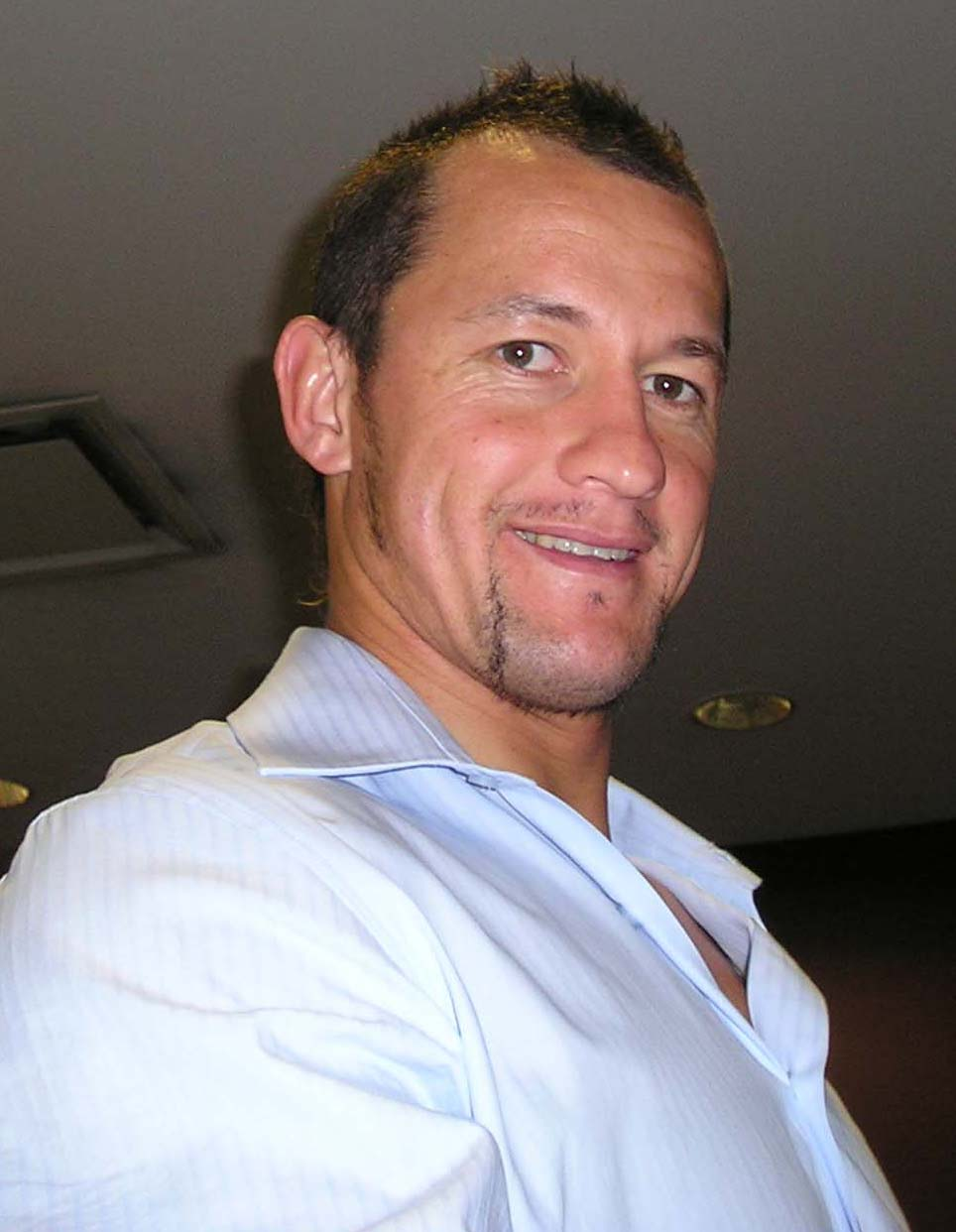
- Spencer in 2008
- Full name: Carlos James Spencer
- Born: 14 October 1975 (age 51) Levin, New Zealand
- Height: 178 cm (5 ft 10 in)
- Weight: 95 kg (209 lb; 14 st 13 lb)
- School: Waiopehu College
- Occupation(s): Head Coach; Assistant Coach

Rugby union career
- Position: First five-eighth
Senior career
Years	Team	Apps	(Points)
1992–1993	Horowhenua-Kapiti	18	(192)
1994–2004	Auckland	89	(491)
1996–2005	Blues	99	(620)
2005–2009	Northampton Saints	70	(172)
2009–2010	Gloucester	16	(22)
2010	Lions	12	(17)
2010	Golden Lions	2	(0)
- Correct as of 29 June 2020
International career
Years	Team	Apps	(Points)
1994–1995	New Zealand U21	6	(44)
1994–2005	New Zealand Māori	10	(54)
1995–2004	New Zealand	44	(383)
1996–1998	New Zealand Barbarians	3	(32)
1997–1999	New Zealand A	5	(65)
2000–2006	Barbarian F.C.	4	(5)
- Correct as of 29 June 2020
Coaching career
- Years: Team
- 2012: Lions
- 2013: Sharks
- 2014: Eastern Province Kings
- 2016–2018: Munakata Sanix Blues
- 2019–2020: Hurricanes (assistant)
- 2022: New Orleans Gold (assistant)
- Correct as of 18 January 2022

Carlos James Spencer (born 14 October 1975) is a retired New Zealand rugby union player. He served as the head coach of the Eastern Province Kings and the Munakata Sanix Blues, as well as assistant coach for the New Orleans Gold of Major League Rugby (MLR).

During his playing days, he played at fly-half (first five-eighth) for the Blues and Lions in Super Rugby and for New Zealand internationally.

== Provincial and club career ==
He generally specialised in the position of fly-half, also known as "first five-eighth" or "number 10", although he also played fullback (number 15) at national and international levels.

Spencer first rose to prominence when he starred alongside Christian Cullen in a Ranfurly Shield challenge in 1994, playing for the Horowhenua team against Auckland. Auckland coach Graham Henry spotted Spencer's talent and recruited him to play for the Auckland team.

He played for the Blues Super 12 team from the inception of the competition in 1996 until 2005, and for the Auckland NPC side.

In 1996, Spencer played for the Blues in the first ever Super 12-match, kicking off the professional era of rugby union. He went on to score 608 points for the Blues in the Super Rugby competition.

In 2005, he signed to the English club, Northampton Saints, where he stayed until 30 January 2009. On 3 February 2009, he signed for Gloucester on a 17-month contract.

In January 2010, Spencer signed with the Johannesburg-based Golden Lions, to play for the team in the 2010 and 2011 Super Rugby seasons. The contract offered to him was said at the time to be the highest ever in South Africa. He subsequently took up a coaching role with the team, before being released following the 2012 season. He moved to the Durban-based Sharks for the 2013 season.

In December 2013, he signed a five-year contract to become the kicking and specialist skills coach at Port Elizabeth-based side, the Eastern Province Kings. He was appointed as their head coach on 20 February 2014. He was in charge for just one Currie Cup season, 2014, where they achieved just one victory in ten matches. Brent Janse van Rensburg was appointed as head coach for the 2015 Currie Cup Premier Division season with Spencer reverting to kicking and specialist skills coach. However, Spencer left the coaching staff a month later.

In May 2025, Spencer was named head coach of Terenure College RFC in Dublin, Ireland, in what was considered a major coup for the All-Ireland League club.

== International career ==
Spencer first played for the All Blacks in a non-test tour match on 4 November 1995, but did not play his first test match until 1997. His test debut was against Argentina at Athletic Park in Wellington on 21 June that year. He scored 33 points in that match alone.

His All Black appearances as a starter were somewhat irregular thereafter, as Andrew Mehrtens was generally preferred as the first-choice flyhalf for the side during the period from 1995 to 2002. He was selected for the 1999 All Blacks World Cup squad but became injured in training at London, so did not play a match in that tournament. However, following an exceptional season for the Blues in Super 12, Spencer became first-choice first five-eighth for the All Blacks in 2003, and was a part of the squad for the Rugby World Cup that year.

In 2004, Carlos Spencer struggled to find the same form he had displayed the previous year, and Mehrtens replaced him for the final game of that year's Tri Nations. He was then ruled out of the final All Black tour of the year through injury. In 2005, Spencer lost form early in the Super 12 competition and then suffered a fractured cheekbone in training. He agreed to play for the New Zealand Māori (in his 10th match for that team) against the touring Lions, but made himself unavailable for the All Blacks so that he would not miss training for his new English club, Northampton Saints.

As a player, Spencer was valued for his kicking and passing game, as well as his abilities in defense. A reliable kicker, only five players have scored more test points than Spencer for New Zealand — Daniel Carter 1,598, Andrew Mehrtens 967, Grant Fox 645, Beauden Barrett 465, and most recently, Aaron Cruden 322.

== Boxing ==
On 3 December 2011, Spencer stepped into the boxing ring against Rugby league's Awen Guttenbeil in Fight for Life 2011 in Auckland, New Zealand. The fight was controversially ruled a draw despite Spencer knocking down Guttenbeil with seconds remaining on the last round.

== Awards and honours ==
In 2006, Spencer was named in the Guinness Premiership Awards Dream Team and collected the Player of the Year award for the 2005–06 season at the Northampton Saints annual awards, as voted for by the club's fans. He played in four matches for Bob Dwyer's World XV team in 2006, including a match for the Barbarians against England at Twickenham on 28 May and a 30–27 loss to the Springboks at Ellis Park on 3 June.

== Personal life ==
He married Jodene Spencer. Their son Payton Spencer is an international rugby player for New Zealand Sevens. His daughter, Asha is 16 as of 2024.

== Match Fit ==
In 2024, he made his debut with Paul Whatuira and Louis Anderson in Match Fit: Union vs. League. Whatuira also beat Spencer in a charity Fight For Life boxing match. Spencer and Pita Alatini both maxed out the metabolic age potential to -15 against their biological ages. Despite this, it was revealed that both he and Louis Anderson have a family history of high blood cholesterol despite having lower metabolic age than biological age and were two of the fittest in the group. At the final weigh in, however, he also gained the perfect score for percentage of visceral fat for males at 4%.

He had polarized the nation as he was one of the first ball-dominant fly halves in New Zealand, playing more like a scrum half than a first five-eighth. He was also never known as a reliable kicker, which is an expected role of a traditional first five-eighth. He also received online and media abuse against him. During an IronMaori triathlon, he covered for Paul Miller as a cyclist (with Frank Bunce) and runner (with Pita Alatini). He led the Union team to beat Team League in triathlon.

Awards
Preceded by Caleb Ralph	Tom French Memorial; Māori rugby union player of the year 2002, 2003	Succeeded by Carl Hayman
