= Peter Marshall (rugby union) =

Australian rugby union referee (born 1955)

Peter Leslie Marshall (born 28 July 1955 in Sydney, Australia), is a former international rugby union referee.

A former first-grade player with Sydney club Manly, Marshall made his test refereeing debut in the match between Fiji and Tonga in 1993. He officiated in over 30 test matches and retired after the 2003 Rugby World Cup to take up the position of referees' manager at Rugby Australia.
