= Damian Smith (rugby union) =

- Born: 1 February 1969 (age 57)
- Height: 5 ft 9 in (1.75 m)
- Weight: 101 kg (15 st 13 lb)
- School: Clairvaux MacKillop College

Rugby union career
- Position: Wing
Senior career
Years	Team	Apps	(Points)
1987–98	Souths		
1999–2002	Gold Coast		
Super Rugby
Years	Team	Apps	(Points)
1992–01	Queensland	119	
International career
Years	Team	Apps	(Points)
1993–98	Australia	21	(50)

Damian Smith (born 1 February 1969) is a former Australian rugby union player. He played as a winger for Queensland and went on to win 21 caps for Australia between 1993 and 1998.

== Rugby career ==
Right-winger Damian Smith played club rugby in Armidale for St Alberts College and then in Brisbane for Souths. He was first selected for Queensland to play against Canterbury in 1992. The following season he made his debut for Australia on 31 July 1993 in Sydney against South Africa.

Smith was a member of the Australian squad at the 1995 Rugby World Cup where he played in three matches and scored tries against England and Romania

After suffering a broken leg in 2001 playing for the Reds against the Stormers in South Africa, Smith came back to play two matches for the Reds in 2002 against the Fiji Warriors and the New Zealand Maori, winning 119 Queensland caps before retiring from rugby.
