= Simon Culhane =

- Born: Simon David Culhane; 10 March 1968 (age 58) Invercargill, New Zealand
- Height: 1.75 m (5 ft 9 in)
- Weight: 95 kg (14 st 13 lb)
- School: Kingswell High School
- Notable relative: Benjamin Culhane (son)
- Occupation: Builder

Rugby union career
- Position: First five-eighth
Provincial / State sides
Years	Team	Apps	(Points)
1988–1998	Southland	104	(976)
1999	Otago	6	(48)
Super Rugby
Years	Team	Apps	(Points)
1996–1999	Highlanders	16	(96)
International career
Years	Team	Apps	(Points)
1995–1996	New Zealand	6	(114)
Coaching career
- Years: Team
- 2005–: Southland
- 2011–: Highlanders (assistant coach)

Simon Culhane (born 10 March 1968 in Invercargill, New Zealand) is a former rugby union player who won six caps playing at fly-half for the New Zealand rugby union side (the All Blacks).

Culhane made his international test debut at the age of 27 on 4 June 1995 during the 1995 Rugby World Cup. The match, against Japan was won 145–17 and is the largest winning margin for an All Blacks side. Culhane amassed 45 points during his debut, a world record for first class test rugby that still stands today, slotting 20 of 21 conversion attempts and scoring a try. He lost his place in the starting line-up for the next match to first-choice Andrew Mehrtens. He then went on to win just five more caps. He currently coaches Rugby Southland in the New Zealand National Provincial Championship.

He also played cricket for Southland in the Hawke Cup.
