= Jon Preston =

New Zealand rugby union player (born 1967)

- Born: Jon Paul Preston; 15 November 1967 (age 58) Dunedin, New Zealand
- Height: 1.76 m (5 ft 9 in)
- Weight: 77 kg (170 lb)
- School: St Bede's College

Rugby union career
- Position(s): Halfback; First five-eighth
Senior career
Years	Team	Apps	(Points)
1998–2001	Bath Rugby		
Provincial / State sides
Years	Team	Apps	(Points)
1988–92	Canterbury	22	(129)
1993–98	Wellington	72	(669)
Super Rugby
Years	Team	Apps	(Points)
1996–98	Hurricanes	25	(300)
International career
Years	Team	Apps	(Points)
1991–97	New Zealand	10	(34)

Jon Paul Preston (born 15 November 1967) is a former New Zealand rugby union player. A halfback and first five-eighth, Preston represented Canterbury and Wellington at a provincial level and the Hurricanes in Super Rugby. He was a member of the New Zealand national side, the All Blacks, from 1991 to 1997, playing 27 matches for the team, including 10 internationals.
