= Scott McLeod (rugby union) =

NZ international rugby union player

- Full name: Scott James McLeod
- Born: 28 February 1973 (age 53) Brisbane, Queensland, Australia
- Height: 191 cm (6 ft 3 in)
- Weight: 100 kg (220 lb; 15 st 10 lb)
- School: Hamilton Boys' High School

Rugby union career
- Position(s): Centre, Wing
Senior career
Years	Team	Apps	(Points)
1995–2001	Waikato	69	(165)
1996–2001	Chiefs	44	(40)
- Correct as of 19 December 2019
International career
Years	Team	Apps	(Points)
1996–1998	New Zealand	10	(5)
1999–2000	New Zealand A	6	(10)
- Correct as of 19 December 2019
Coaching career
- Years: Team
- 2008–2012: Waikato (Assistant coach)
- 2008–2011: Chiefs (Assistant coach)
- 2012: New Zealand U20
- 2013–2017: Highlanders (Assistant coach)
- 2017–2023: New Zealand (Assistant coach)
- 2024–2026: Kubota Spears (Assistant coach)
- 2026–: Australia (Assistant/Defence coach)
- Correct as of 9 August 2026

Scott James McLeod (born 28 February 1973) is a New Zealand rugby union coach and former player. McLeod played 10 tests for the All Blacks from 1996 to 1998, and played domestic rugby for Waikato, Waikato Chiefs, and Toshiba Brave Lupus. In March 2026, McLeod was appointed as an assistant coach for the Wallabies.

== Career ==
=== Provincial career and Super 12 ===
McLeod was born in Brisbane, Australia. He first came to prominence playing amateur club rugby in Hamilton and in John Boe's Waikato Colts teams. He made his NPC debut for Waikato in 1995 and was named as a standby for the All Blacks 1995 end of year tour of Italy and France. In 1996, McLeod made his Super 12 debut for the Waikato Chiefs. He went on to play 69 matches for Waikato and 44 matches for the Chiefs; towards the end of his playing career in New Zealand he was in competition with Mark Ranby and Keith Lowen for starting positions in both sides. He won the Ranfurly Shield twice with Waikato, against Taranaki in 1996 and Auckland in 1997.

At the end of the 2001 season, McLeod departed New Zealand to take up a professional contract in Japan with Toshiba Brave Lupus. He played for Toshiba from 2002 until his retirement in 2009.

== International career ==
McLeod played his first tests for the All Blacks in 1996, starting at second five-eighth in place of the injured Walter Little against Manu Samoa and Scotland. McLeod lost his test place to Little but went on to play as a midweek and substitute player in 17 All Black matches between 1996 and 1998, including 10 tests and three test starts. McLeod lost his place in the test squad due to injuries, loss of form and increasing competition from players like Mark Mayerhofler, Alama Ieremia and Eroni Clarke. He remained on the periphery of All Blacks selections up until 2000, with six appearances for New Zealand A.

== Coaching career ==
McLeod returned to New Zealand from Japan in 2008 to work as skills coach for the Waikato rugby team. He returned to Hamilton permanently in 2009 after finishing his final season with Toshiba. In 2009, McLeod was appointed assistant coach to Chris Gibbes for the Waikato Air New Zealand Cup (now ITM Cup) team. McLeod has worked as skills coach for the Waikato Chiefs.

McLeod served as an assistant coach for the All Blacks from 2017 to 2023. In June 2024, McLeod was announced as the latest coaching appointment for the Kubota Spears in the Japan Rugby League One (JRLO), working under Frans Ludeke. In March 2026, it was reported that McLeod would leave the club at the end of the 2025–26 Japan Rugby League One season to take up the assistant coaching role for Australia under their newly appointed coach Les Kiss. In August, McLeod was formally appointed the assistant coach of Australia.

== Personal life ==
McLeod is married to wife Dana and the couple have four children. In 2008, the destruction of his house by an arsonist received national coverage in New Zealand.
