= Mark Mayerhofler =

- Born: Mark Andrew Mayerhofler; 8 October 1972 (age 54) Auckland, New Zealand
- Height: 1.82 m (6 ft 0 in)
- Weight: 98 kg (15 st 6 lb)
- School: Henderson High

Rugby union career
- Position: Centre
Amateur team(s)
Years	Team	Apps	(Points)
- Christchurch
Senior career
Years	Team	Apps	(Points)
2002–2007	Newcastle	70	(45)
Provincial / State sides
Years	Team	Apps	(Points)
2002	North Harbour	10	
1994–2000	Canterbury	-	
1992–93	North Harbour	-	
- Correct as of 26 April 2008
Super Rugby
Years	Team	Apps	(Points)
2002	Blues	11	
1996–2000	Crusaders	53	
International career
Years	Team	Apps	(Points)
1998	New Zealand	6	(10)

Mark Andrew Mayerhofler (born 8 October 1972) is a former rugby union player who represented the New Zealand All Blacks six times in 1998. In 1997 he won the Tom French Cup, an honour awarded annually by New Zealand Rugby Union (NZRU) to the Maori player of the year. He also played for Newcastle Falcons in the Guinness Premiership. Whilst at Newcastle he started as they won the 2004 Powergen Cup final.

He attended Henderson High School, Auckland New Zealand.

Mayerhofler's position of choice was as a 2nd 5/8

Awards
Preceded by Errol Brain	Tom French Memorial; Māori rugby union player of the year 1997	Succeeded by Tony Brown
