= Adrian Cashmore =

New Zealand rugby player

- Born: 23 July 1973 (age 53) Tokoroa, New Zealand
- Height: 1.83 m (6 ft 0 in)
- Weight: 90 kg (200 lb)
- School: Tauranga Boys' College

Rugby union career
- Position(s): Fullback, Wing
Senior career
Years	Team	Apps	(Points)
2005–2006	Ospreys		
Provincial / State sides
Years	Team	Apps	(Points)
1992, 2005	Bay of Plenty		
1994–2000	Auckland	73	(826)
Super Rugby
Years	Team	Apps	(Points)
1996–2000	Blues	47	(619)
2004–2005	Chiefs		
International career
Years	Team	Apps	(Points)
1996–2000	New Zealand	2	(0)
National sevens team
Years	Team		Comps
1995	New Zealand 7s		

Adrian Richard Cashmore (born 23 July 1973 in Tokoroa, New Zealand) is a rugby player who played for Auckland and Bay of Plenty provincially, and the Auckland Blues and Chiefs in Super Rugby. He also played professionally in Japan and for Welsh region the Ospreys in the Celtic League. He also made two appearances for New Zealand.

He played predominantly at fullback and was usually his team's goalkicker. His career began with Bay of Plenty in 1992, however in 1993 he made the move north to Auckland where he spent the bulk of his career. He amassed 619 points in the Super Rugby competition for the Auckland Blues and 826 points for Auckland provincially. During his time in Auckland he won two Super Rugby titles with the Blues, in 1996 and 1997, two NPC titles with Auckland, in 1995 and 1996, and twice won the Ranfurly shield, also in 1995 and 1996.

In 2000 he left New Zealand to play in Japan, where he remained until 2004. Upon returning to New Zealand he spent the 2004 and 2005 seasons with Bay of Plenty provincially and the Chiefs in Super Rugby, winning the Ranfurly Shield and reaching the NPC semi finals in 2004 with the former. In 2005 he again went offshore and spent a season with the Ospreys before retiring in 2006.
