= Blues (Super Rugby) =

New Zealand rugby union club, based in Auckland

- Union: New Zealand Rugby Union
- Nickname: The Blues
- Founded: 1996; 30 years ago
- Location: Auckland, New Zealand
- Region: Auckland; North Harbour; Northland
- Ground: Eden Park (Capacity: 50,000)
- Coach: Jason Holland
- Captain: TBA
- Most caps: Keven Mealamu (164)
- Top scorer: Adrian Cashmore (617)
- Most tries: Doug Howlett (55)
- League: Super Rugby Pacific
- 2026: 4th overall Playoffs: Semi-finalist
Team kit

Official website
- www.blues.rugby

The Blues (Māori: Kahurangi; known as the Auckland Blues from 1996 to 1999) are a New Zealand professional rugby union team based in Auckland, who play in the Super Rugby competition. Like New Zealand's four other Super Rugby teams, the Blues were established by the NZRU in 1996. One of the most successful teams in Super Rugby history, the Blues won the competition in its first two seasons, 1996 and 1997, and again in 2003 and 2024. Additionally, the team were finalists in 1998 and 2022, and semi-finalists in 2007, 2011 and 2023. They won a Trans Tasman competition in 2021.

== History ==
=== Formation, early years and immediate success (1996–97) ===
The team's logo from 1997 to 1999, when the team dropped the Auckland prefix from its official name.

Along with New Zealand's other Super Rugby sides, the Blues were established by the New Zealand Rugby Union (NZRU) to take part in the newly formed Super 12 competition which, involved teams from South Africa and Australia in addition to New Zealand. Each of New Zealand's five sides represented a number of provincial unions, with the Blues representing the Auckland, Counties Manukau and Thames Valley unions, while the neighbouring Waikato Chiefs representing the Waikato, Bay of Plenty, King Country, Northland and North Harbour unions. As the amount of international representatives in the Auckland region was thought to be unfair, it was split up between The Blues and The Chiefs. During this era, the Blues played the majority of their home matches at Eden Park, with round robin fixtures occasionally held at Growers Stadium in Pukekohe.

The Blues tasted immediate success, winning the Super 12 back-to-back in 1996 and 1997. In 1996 the side won eight of eleven round robin matches and finished the regular season in second place (behind the Queensland Reds on 41 points. They then went on to defeat Northern Transvaaal, now the Bulls, 48–11 in the semi-final at Eden Park. This result secured a home final, where the Blues comfortably defeated the Sharks 45–21. In 1997, the side improved on their previous season, comfortably topping the table with 50 points after going undefeated in the regular season, the sole blemish on an otherwise perfect season being a draw with Northern Transvaal in a re-match of the previous season's semi-final. The Blues once again easily won their semi-final, defeating the Sharks 55–36 at Eden Park and again securing a home final. The 1997 final was a more hard-fought encounter than the previous year's, with the Blues defeating the ACT Brumbies 23–7.

=== Middle years (1998–2005) ===
By the end of the 1990s the number of international representatives from the Blues region had decreased. This led the Blues and the Chiefs to arrange a swap, where the Chiefs would represent the Thames Valley and Counties Manukau provincial unions in exchange for the Blues representing the Northland and North Harbour unions in addition to Auckland. Although in the seasons leading up to the trade North Harbour and Northland had outperformed Counties Manukau and Thames Valley in provincial rugby (thus potentially widening the already sizeable gap between the Blues' and Chiefs' on-field performance), it enabled both teams to represent unions in closer geographical proximity. Because of this trade, the Blues lost the area colloquially referred to as South Auckland, (excluding those portions of the South Auckland to the north of Manurewa). Thus, the Blues traded a portion of South Auckland for the Northern portion of the Auckland region and Northland, and still do not represent the entire Auckland region. Generally supporters in the South Auckland region identify as Blues supporters even though they are technically in the Chiefs region. In 2000, the Auckland Blues dropped the Auckland prefix from their name, and became known simply as "Blues".

The 1998 season saw the Blues again top the points table with 43 points at the conclusion of the round robin, with nine wins and two losses to their credit. They defeated the Otago Highlanders by 37–31 in the side's third consecutive home semi-final, securing a home final against the Crusaders, a match which promised a great deal due to Auckland's traditional sporting rivalry with Canterbury. The Crusaders ultimately won the match by 20–13, putting an end to the Blues' dominance of the competition.

From 1999 – 2002 the Blues' onfield performance was poor, missing the playoffs every season, finishing at an all-time low of 11th on the ladder in 2001 with just four wins for the season. The club was able to turn its from around in the 2003 season, topping the ladder with 49 points and 10 wins from 11 matches. The team went on to defeat the ACT Brumbies by 42–21 in the semi-final, before beating the Crusaders 21–17 in the final for the team's third Super Rugby title. The Blues were unable to follow their 2003 success up in 2004 and 2005 however, missing the playoffs in both seasons.

=== Super 14 era (2006–10) ===
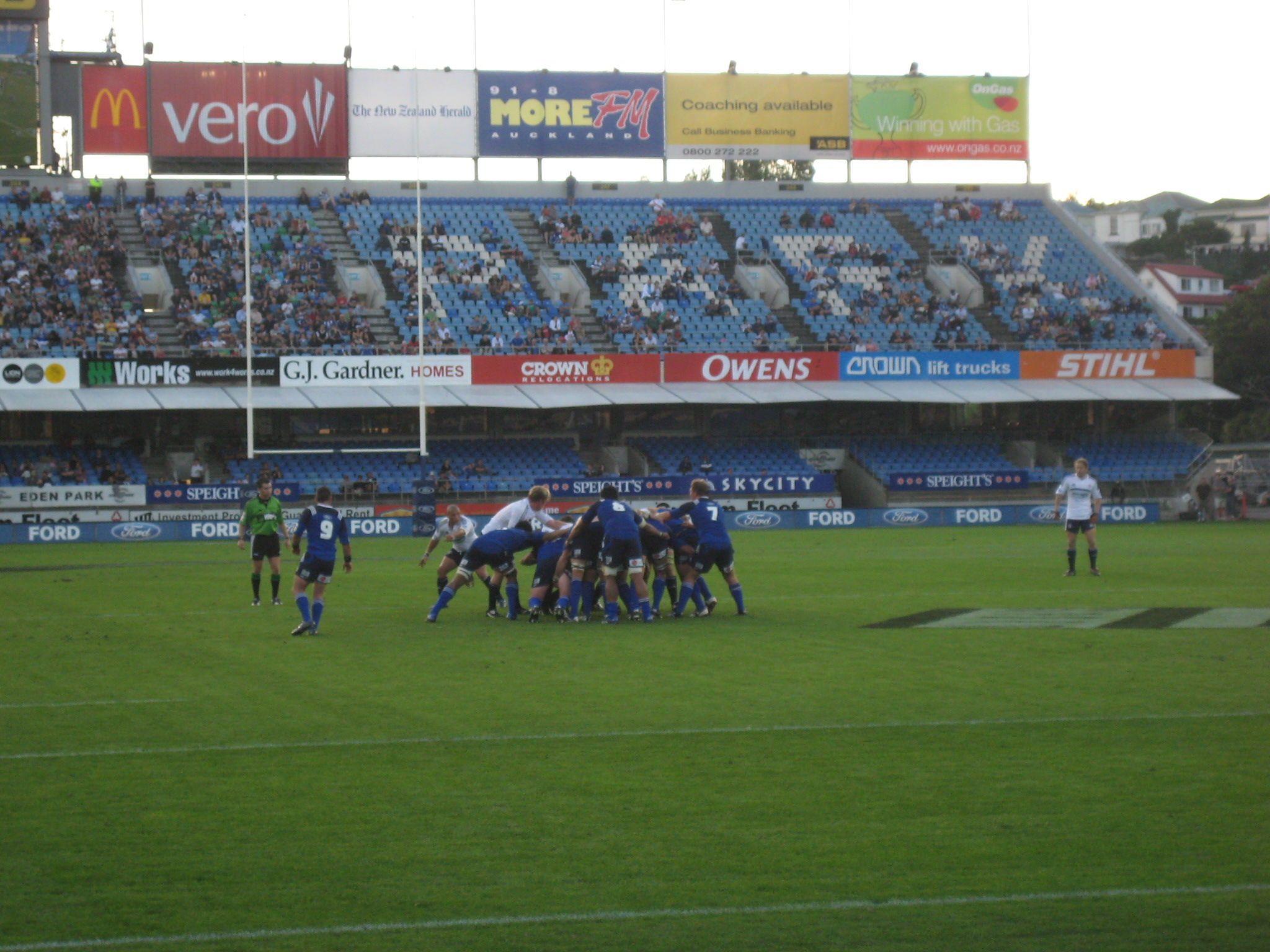
Blues playing against the Crusaders in Eden Park in 2008

The expanded 14 team competition could not have started worse for the Blues, who were in 2006 forced by the NZRU to include North Harbour captain Rua Tipoki in their squad of 24 players who are 'protected' from the draft. Tipoki was originally to be excluded from the draft due to personal circumstances to stay in Auckland. Andrew Mehrtens had in the past done this with the Crusaders. The NZRU however forced coach David Nucifora to pick Tipoki in his 24-man squad and hence drop another player. It is believed the NZRU was in favour of dropping players such as Isa Nacewa who are ineligible to play for the All Blacks. Instead, Nucifora excluded All Black Isaia Toeava, who subsequently played for the Hurricanes in 2006. Following the draft fiasco, and the forgettable season which followed, the Blues showed signs of resurgence in 2007, finishing the round robin in fourth place, securing a semi-final against the Sharks in Durban. The travel and form of the opposition were too difficult to overcome, however, with the Blues losing 34–18 to the eventual runners-up. The 2008 season, the final under coach David Nucifora, saw the team finish the season with an 8–5 record and a sixth-place finish on the ladder. In 2009, Pat Lam was appointed as coach, however the team was not able to make significant improvements under his leadership for the remainder of Super 14, missing the playoffs in both the 2009 and 2010 seasons.

=== Super Rugby era (2011–present) ===
==== 2011 season ====
In 2011 the Super Rugby competition was expanded to 15 teams and adopted a conference format. The Blues had a successful start to the season, defeating the Crusaders by 24–22 at Eden Park. This was followed by a win and a loss on their South African tour, followed by a 22–22 draw against the Western Force in Perth. This was followed by a seven match winning streak between rounds five and twelve. However, the mid-season winning streak came to an abrupt end with a 37–31 loss to the Queensland Reds in Brisbane, which initiated a four-match losing streak. In the final round-robin match of the season, the Blues defeated the Highlanders by 33–16 at Eden Park, securing the side's first playoff appearance since 2007 and first home playoff match since 2003. The team subsequently defeated the New South Wales Waratahs 26 – 13 to secure a semi-final against the Queensland Reds in Brisbane, which they lost 30–13.

The 2011 season also marked the departure of Kurtis Haiu, who was diagnosed with a bone tumour in April. Following his diagnosis, he took an indefinite break from rugby to focus on his health.

==== 2012 season ====
2012, the team's fourth season under coach Pat Lam, saw the arrival of former Hurricanes icons, and 2011 Rugby World Cup winners, Ma'a Nonu and Piri Weepu. The regular season began on 24 February against the Crusaders at Eden Park. Following two successive losses to start the season, the side's first victory came away to the Bulls, with starting debutant Gareth Anscombe scoring all of the Blues points in the 29–23 win. In doing so, Anscombe set a team record for most points in a match. In the same match, Rene Ranger became the first Blues player to receive a white card, which resulted in a two-week suspension. Seven consecutive losses followed, beginning with the Stormers in round four, and finishing with the Hurricanes in round eleven. Growing frustration among fans was evident during this period, with racist remarks directed at coach Pat Lam via social media, talkback radio and the Blues own website. Lam, who is of Samoan descent, received support from a number of former Blues players during this period, including Michael Jones and Eroni Clarke. After beating the Lions in round twelve, the Blues suffered the biggest defeat in club history with a 59 – 12 loss away to the Crusaders, which was followed by losses at home to the Highlanders and table-topping Chiefs. The Blues finished the season on a high note, with wins against the Western Force and Brumbies.

On 17 July, Pat Lam was released. On the same day, Sir John Kirwan was appointed as head coach for the 2013 and 2014 seasons. In August, the Blues' full coaching staff for the 2013 season was announced, with Sir Graham Henry taking on a role as technical advisor and defensive coach, Mick Byrne appointed forwards and kicking coach, and Grant Doorey appointed skills and backline coach.

==== 2013 season ====
The 2013 season saw an all new Blues team with many players leaving, including Ma'a Nonu to the Highlanders and Gareth Anscombe to the Chiefs. On the morning of 31 October 2012 new coach Sir John Kirwan announced the 2013 Blues squad which included 14 Super Rugby debutants, and Ali Williams taking over as captain. Handed a bye on the first round the Blues started the regular season on 23 February 2013 with a 34–20 away win against the Hurricanes, followed by a 34–15 home win against the Crusaders the next week. Three consecutive losses followed, including the Bulls' first victory at Eden Park. The Blues regained some form again, winning four of the next five games. Beating the Highlanders at home and completing the double over the Hurricanes with a 28–6 win at Eden Park before losing a close game against the Reds. The Blues then defeated both the Stormers and the Rebels before losing 3 games in a row to the Crusaders, Brumbies, and Highlanders respectively. The Blues then travelled to South Africa with two must win games against the Sharks and the Cheetahs, unfortunately losing both and ending the Blues chances of making the play-offs. Ali Williams played his 100th game for the Blues against the Sharks. The Blues returned to New Zealand with a last home game against the already play-off qualified Chiefs. Despite a red card to Kane Barrett for stomping in the 23rd minute, the Blues played a remarkably strong game, taking the lead just after half-time but a yellow card to first-five Baden Kerr struck another blow for the Blues. The mounting Chiefs pressure paid off resulting in a Ben Tameifuna try with 17 minutes to go, winning the game for the Chiefs. The Blues walked off the field to a standing ovation from their fans, the first time an Eden Park crowd had been upstanding for a defeat.

The Blues finished the season in 10th place, with six players earning call-ups to the New Zealand national team, the All Blacks, and Frank Halai as the team's top try scorer scoring 10 tries in his debut season. They signed international super star Benji Marshall for the 2014 season (only to return to league with the Dragons halfway through it) and Ma'a Nonu for two seasons starting in 2014.

==== 2014 season ====
The Blues 2014 season started with coach Sir John Kirwan announcing six new players to the squad including three All Blacks with the return of Ma'a Nonu and Tony Woodcock after they both played with the Highlanders for a season, and Jerome Kaino. This also included former National Rugby League (NRL) player Benji Marshall who had previously played with the Wests Tigers for 10 years.

The Blues season started with an away loss to the Highlanders, going down 29–21. The next week they played their first home game of the season at Eden Park, defeating the Crusaders 35–24. They travelled to South Africa for two games against the Sharks and the Lions, losing both games but coming away with a losing bonus point against the Lions. They returned to New Zealand for two home games against the Cheetahs and the Highlanders, both of which they won bringing the up to 6th place on the ladder. The team travelled to Canberra to face the Brumbies and were defeated 26–9, and were defeated again by the Hurricanes in Wellington after a bye week. This was followed by two home games against the Waratahs and the Reds, winning both and coming away with a bonus point win against the Reds. They then lost their next two games going down to the Chiefs and the Sharks, picking up a losing bonus point against the Sharks. They returned to Eden park to defeat the Hurricanes, followed by a bonus point win in Perth against the Western Force. This put them into 8th place on the ladder with two games to play in the regular season before finals, needing to place in the top 6 for a spot in the play-offs. They lost to the Crusaders in Christchurch, therefore to make the finals they needed to win their final game against the Chiefs who were in the same situation. They lost their final game against the Chiefs going down 11–8, putting them out of the finals and ending a six-game winning streak at Eden Park for the season. The Blues finished 10th overall and 5th place in the New Zealand conference.

Ihaia West, Patrick Tuipulotu, Benji Marshall, and Tom Donnelly all made their Super Rugby debut for the Blues in the 2014 season.

==== 2015 season ====
The 2015 season started with coach Sir John Kirwan announcing the Blues squad, with the inclusion of 11 new players after losing 12 players including Ma'a Nonu and Piri Weepu, who both played over 100 super rugby games.

The Blues season started with a loss to the Chiefs, going down 23–18, picking up a losing bonus point. This was followed by an unsuccessful tour of South Africa, going down to the Stormers and Cheetahs, coming away with a single bonus point from a 25–24 loss to the Cheetahs. This was followed by four consecutive losses against the Lions, Hurricanes, Waratahs and Chiefs, 3 of which they picked up a losing bonus point. Their first win of the season came against the Brumbies at Eden Park with a 16–14 victory, ending the Blues 9 game losing streak. This was followed by consecutive losses against the Highlanders and Crusaders, picking up a bonus point against the Highlanders. This was followed by a strong 41–24 win against the Force. Their next game against the Rebels was their final away game of the season, they lost 42–22, ending the season with no away wins, having only won two away games in the last three years. Their final four games were all at home with high hopes of finishing the season on a high. They won the first game 23–18 against the South African conference leaders the Bulls, however this was their last win of the season going down in their final three games against the Hurricanes, Crusaders and Highlanders. This ended the franchises worst super rugby season, ending in 14th place ahead of the Force, with just 3 from 16 wins for the season.

The end of the season was marked by the resignation of coach Sir John Kirwan, who had been with the team for the last three years winning just 17 out of 58 games. The Blues signed former All Black captain Tana Umaga to replace Sir John Kirwan as head coach of the Blues.

==== 2016 season ====
The Blues endured yet another disappointing year in 2016, although there were some improvements. A close first round win over the Highlanders by 33–31 was followed by successive losses to the Crusaders (28–13) and Hurricanes (19–23). A 25–25 draw with the Reds in Round 4 was followed by a 24–16 win over the Jaguares in Round 6 (Round 5 being a bye). A week later the Blues lost to the Chiefs by 23–29, but bounced back with wins over the Sharks (23–18), Rebels (36–30) and Kings (34–18). A 43–5 loss to eventual finalists the Lions was followed by a tight 17–13 win over the Force. Another tight game resulted in a 21–26 loss to the Crusaders, while a yet another loss followed against the Hurricanes 27–37. Dominant wins against the Brumbies (40–15) and Waratahs (34–28) showed that the Blues could still be highly competitive, however their last-place conference finish left them outside the qualification pool for the season's semi-finals, with rival New Zealand franchise the Hurricanes emerging the eventual champions.

==== 2017 season ====
2017 again saw the Blues finish bottom of the New Zealand conference, with an even 7 wins and 7 losses to their credit. The up and down nature of their season was reflected in the margins of both their biggest win – 56–18 in Round 1 over the Rebels – and their heaviest defeat – 48–21 to the Sunwolves in the final round in Tokyo. During the 2017 British and Irish Lions tour, the Blues pulled off a shock win over the British and Irish Lions 22–26 at Eden Park. Rookie Blues winger Reiko Ioane distinguished himself during the match, scoring a try and notably outpacing Lions and England winger Elliot Daly. Blues reserve first-five Ihaia West and All Black centre Sonny Bill Williams also impressed during the match, both scoring tries and West adding a penalty and conversion to a remarkable result against the tourists.

==== 2018 season ====
2018 would see the Blues again finish last in their conference, with a poor record of only four wins vs 12 losses in a miserable season. Crushing losses to the Hurricanes (42–24) and Crusaders (54–17) in the last two rounds illustrated how far the team's performances had collapsed from coach Tana Umaga's first, relatively respectable season in charge, and emphasized the need for structural reform at the club. A reshuffle resulted in Umaga being demoted to an assistant coaching role, and the appointment of former All Black, Crusaders assistant and Tasman Mako head coach Leon MacDonald as new Blues coach the following season.

==== 2019 season ====
MacDonald's first year in charge saw little in the way of definite improvements to the Blues win–loss record, with only 5 wins from 17 games giving them their sixth consecutive last-place finish in the New Zealand conference. All Black prop Karl Tu'inukuafe and former All Black Ma'a Nonu were recruited from the Chiefs and Toulon, respectively. While their overall standards had improved, their margins of both victory and defeat remaining consistently low, the Blues were unable to mount much of a challenge that season.

==== 2020 season ====
Due to the COVID-19 Global Pandemic there was no international Super Rugby competition held in 2020 – with the competition instead delivered via 3 local conferences i.e. Australia, NZ and South Africa. In the NZ Conference, Super Rugby Aotearoa, the Blues had a significantly improved season, winning five of their seven games and claiming fourth position at the end of the season.

==== 2021 season ====
Due to the COVID-19 pandemic the tournament was wholly regionalised, with the 2021 Super Rugby Aotearoa season and the 2021 Super Rugby AU season replacing the previous 15 side format used from 2018 till 2020. Super Rugby Trans-Tasman followed these tournaments, a crossover competition that featured the five Australian sides playing the five New Zealand sides.

The Blues won 4 of their 8 games, finishing the 2021 season in 3rd place, in the 6 team NZ based competition.

==== 2022 Season ====
The Blues participated in the first Super Rugby Pacific season in 2022, and finished first in the 12 team round robin. In round 9 they scored their first win in Christchurch over the Crusaders since 2004, winning 27–24 at Orangetheory Stadium. In round 15 they beat the Warratahs 20–17, by a Zarn Sullivan drop goal after the 80 minute mark. This marked the franchise's 13th straight win, the longest in franchise history. In the quarter-finals, they played the Highlanders, who they beat 35–6, to reach their first semi-final in 11 years. In the semi-finals, they beat the Brumbies 20–19 in a thrilling encounter. Brumbies first-five Noah Lolesio had a match winning drop goal attempt, but this was charged down by Blues prop Ofa Tuʻungafasi, in turn sending the Blues to their first final since 2003, where they were defeated by the Crusaders 21–7 in front of a packed out Eden Park.

==== 2023 Season ====
The Blues landed third in the 12 team round robin for Super Rugby Pacific 2023 season. They defeated the Waratahs 41–12 in the QF, but lost the Semi-Final 15–52 to the Crusaders, who went on to win the 2023 Final against the Chiefs.

==== 2024 Season ====
The Blues had a three-way tie W-D-L in the 2024 season round robin, along with the Hurricanes and Brumbies. The Bonus Points were the deciding factor, placing the Hurricanes first, Blues second, and Brumbies third. Having qualified for the quarter finals, the Blues went on to defeat the Fiji Drua 36-5 which matched them up against the Brumbies for their Semi Final. The Blues won 34-20 ensuring their spot in the Grand Final. The Chiefs defeated the round-robin winning Hurricanes 30–19 in the Semi Finals. The Grand Final was the Blue's game, the final score being 41–10, and the Blues had won their first Super Rugby title since 2003.

== Rivalries ==
Overall the Blues have dated rivalries with all other New Zealand-based Super Rugby teams (Chiefs, Hurricanes, Crusaders and Highlanders), however a notable trophy is contested between the Blues and Highlanders. The Gordon Hunter Memorial Trophy is contested between the Blues and Highlanders as a part of regular season fixtures between the two sides. The trophy is awarded in memory of Gordon Hunter, who had been head coach of both teams prior to his death in 2002.

== Stadium ==
The team's primary home ground is Eden Park, located in the central Auckland suburb of Kingsland. The stadium has a capacity of 50,000. In addition to hosting Blues home matches, the ground is the home of the Auckland Rugby Football Union and Auckland Cricket, and is a frequent host of All Blacks matches, and hosted the 2011 Rugby World Cup semi-finals, third-place playoff, and final.

In addition to Eden Park, Blues home matches are occasionally held at North Harbour Stadium, home of the North Harbour Rugby Union, and Okara Park, home of the Northland Rugby Union.

Auckland	Albany	Whangārei
Eden Park	QBE Stadium	Northland Events Centre
Capacity: 50,000	Capacity: 30,000	Capacity: 18,500

== Franchise area and ownership ==
The Blues represent the Auckland, North Harbour, and Northland rugby unions. As of 2021 60% of the club is owned (divided 65%, 29% and 6%) by the three unions, through Rugby Holdings Ltd., and 40% by private consortium Better Blues Company Limited. The previous Blues (and Auckland Rugby Football Union) CEO was Michael Redman, who was formerly CEO of the New Zealand Breakers basketball team. The current board is made up of six members. Don Mackinnon, also a former New Zealand Netball and High Performance Sport NZ director, took over in 2019 as Blues Chairman from Tony Carter who chaired the board since it became a stand-alone organisation in 2013. The current board includes John Hart, Sam Lotu-liga, Richard Dellabarca, Kate Daly, Grant Graham and Brian Wilsher.

Andrew Hore took up the top job as CEO of the Blues in October 2019. Hore beat off serious competition from 70 applicants to become Blues CEO and believes glory days can return to the team's home ground of Eden Park. Hore was previously CEO at the Ospreys in Wales before going on to turn around the New South Wales Waratahs and NSW Rugby before deciding it was time to return to New Zealand to the Blues' challenge.

== Development team ==
The Blues have fielded a development team in competitions such as the Pacific Rugby Cup and in matches against other representative teams for several seasons. Known as the Blues Development XV, the squad is selected from the best emerging rugby talent in the Blues catchment area and is composed of Blues contracted players, wider training group members, under 20s, and selected club players.

== Current squad ==
The squad for the 2027 Super Rugby Pacific season is:

2027 Blues squad
**Props**: (New Zealand) Ben Ake; (New Zealand) Josh Fusitu'a; (New Zealand) Marcel Renata; (New Zealand) Mason Tupaea; (New Zealand) **Ofa Tuʻungafasi**; (New Zealand) Flyn Yates; **Hookers**: (New Zealand) James Mullan; (New Zealand) Eli Oudenryn; (New Zealand) Bradley Slater; **Locks**: (New Zealand) Josh Beehre; (New Zealand) Tristyn Cook; (New Zealand) **Sam Darry**; (New Zealand) Jack Lee; (New Zealand) **Patrick Tuipulotu**	**Loose forwards**: (New Zealand) Torian Barnes; (New Zealand) Cam Christie; (New Zealand) Che Clark; (New Zealand) Jed Melvin; (New Zealand) **Ardie Savea**; (New Zealand) **Anton Segner**; (New Zealand) Malachi Wrampling; **Halfbacks (scrum-halves)**: (New Zealand) **Finlay Christie**; (New Zealand) Taufa Funaki; (New Zealand) Nic Shearer; **First five-eighths (fly-halves)**: (New Zealand) **Beauden Barrett**; (New Zealand) Cam Millar; (New Zealand) Rico Simpson	**Midfielders (centres)**: (Tonga) **Pita Ahki** (injured); (New Zealand) James Cameron; (New Zealand) Leo Gordon; (New Zealand) **Rieko Ioane**; (New Zealand) Zarn Sullivan; (New Zealand) Xavi Taele; **Outside backs**: (New Zealand) Kade Banks; (New Zealand) **Caleb Clarke**; (Australia) **Darby Lancaster**; (New Zealand) Payton Spencer; (New Zealand) Rory Taylor; (New Zealand) Cody Vai
**Bold** denotes internationally capped players. denotes an injured player. Source:

=== Wider training group ===
The following players were named in the Blues wider training group for the 2027 Super Rugby Pacific season:

- (New Zealand) Esile Fono (Prop)
- (New Zealand) Riley Tofilau (Prop)
- (Tonga) Leka Tuʻungafasi (Prop)
- (New Zealand) Jordan Hutchings (Hooker)
- (New Zealand) Tevita Tatafu (Lock)
- (Tonga) **Sam Tuitupou** (Loose forward)
- (New Zealand) Caleb Woodley (Loose forward)
- (New Zealand) Tyson Belworthy (Halfback)
- (New Zealand) Cameron Howell (First five-eighth)
- (New Zealand) Cohen Norrie (First five-eighth)
- (New Zealand) Tom Barham (Midfielder)
- (New Zealand) Harlyn Saunoa (Outside back)

== Captains ==
- (New Zealand) Zinzan Brooke (1996–1997)
- (New Zealand) Michael Jones (1998)
- (New Zealand) Robin Brooke (1999–2001)
- (New Zealand) Glenn Taylor (2002)
- (New Zealand) Xavier Rush (2003–2005)
- (New Zealand) Keven Mealamu (2006, 2009–2012)
- (New Zealand) Troy Flavell (2007–2008)
- (New Zealand) Ali Williams (2013)
- (New Zealand) Luke Braid (2014)
- (New Zealand) Jerome Kaino (2015–2016)
- (New Zealand) James Parsons (2016–2017)
- (New Zealand) Augustine Pulu (2018)
- (New Zealand) Blake Gibson (2019)
- (New Zealand) Patrick Tuipulotu (2019–2021, 2024–present)
- (New Zealand) Dalton Papalii (2022–2023)

== Coaches ==
Blues coaches by date, matches and win percentage*
Coach	Period	G	W	D	L	%
Sir Graham Henry	1996–1998	39	32	1	6	82.1
Jed Rowlands	1999	11	4	1	6	36.4
Gordon Hunter	2000	11	6	0	5	54.5
Frank Oliver	2001	11	4	0	7	36.4
Peter Sloane	2002–2005	46	30	1	15	65.2
David Nucifora	2006–2008	40	23	0	17	57.5
Pat Lam	2009–2012	60	27	1	32	45.0
Sir John Kirwan	2013–2015	48	16	0	32	33.3
Tana Umaga	2016–2018	46	19	2	25	41.3
Leon MacDonald	2019–2023	69	45	1	23	65.2
(New Zealand) Vern Cotter	2024–present	47	31	0	16	66.0
Totals (1996–present)^{*}		428	237	7	184	55.4
Updated to: 19 May 2026

Notes:

^* Official Super Rugby competition matches only, including finals.

== Honours ==
=== Super Rugby (1996–present) ===
- Champions (4)

1996, 1997, 2003, 2024

- Runners-up (2)

1998, 2022

- Super Rugby Trans-Tasman Champions (1)

2021

- Playoff appearances (8)

1996, 1997, 1998, 2003, 2007, 2011, 2021, 2022, 2023, 2024

=== World Club 10s ===
- Champions (1)

2014

=== Brisbane Global Tens ===
- Champions (1)

2018

== Records and achievements ==
=== Season standings ===
A season-by-season summary of Blues regular season results is shown below:

Super 12	Super 14	Super Rugby	Super Rugby Aotearoa	Super Rugby Trans Tasman	Super Rugby Pacific

Season	Pos	Pld	W	D	L	F	A	+/−	BP	Pts	Notes
1996	1st	11	8	0	3	408	354	+54	9	41	Defeated Sharks in final
1997	1st	11	10	1	0	435	283	+152	8	50	Defeated Brumbies in final
1998	2nd	11	9	0	2	388	298	+90	7	43	Lost to Crusaders in final
1999	9th	11	4	1	6	202	201	+1	5	23	
2000	6th	11	6	0	5	300	262	+38	6	30	
2001	11th	11	4	0	7	243	298	−55	4	20	
2002	6th	11	6	0	5	318	249	+69	5	29	
2003	1st	11	10	0	1	393	185	+208	9	49	Defeated Crusaders in final
2004	5th	11	6	1	4	337	309	+28	6	32	
2005	7th	11	6	0	5	243	216	+27	3	27	
2006	8th	13	6	0	7	290	348	–58	5	29	
2007	4th	13	9	0	4	355	235	+120	6	42	Lost to Sharks in semi-final
2008	6th	13	8	0	5	354	267	+87	8	40	
2009	9th	13	5	0	8	339	369	−30	12	32	
2010	7th	13	7	0	6	376	333	+43	9	37	
2011	4th	16	10	1	5	405	335	+70	10	60*	Lost to Reds in semi-final^{1}
2012	12th	16	4	0	12	359	430	−71	8	32*	^{1}
2013	10th	16	6	0	10	347	364	−17	12	44*	^{1}
2014	10th	16	7	0	9	419	395	+24	9	37	
2015	14th	16	3	0	13	282	428	–146	8	20	
2016	11th	15	8	1	6	374	380	–6	5	39	
2017	9th	15	7	1	7	425	391	+34	7	37	
2018	14th	16	4	0	12	378	509	–131	6	22	
2019	13th	16	5	1	10	347	369	−22	8	30	
2020	4th	7	5	0	2	192	134	+58	2	22	Season cancelled due to COVID-19^{2}
2020	2nd	8	5	1*	2	176	149	+27	2	24	No playoffs, round robin only^{3}
2021	3rd	8	4	0	4	210	191	+19	4	20	^{4}
2021	1st	5	5	0	0	198	79	+119	3	23	Defeated Highlanders in final^{5}
2022	2nd	14	13	0	1	472	284	+188	6	58	Lost to Crusaders in final
2023	3rd	14	10	0	4	446	292	+154	6	46	Lost to Crusaders in semi-final
2024	1st	18	16	0	2	599	268	+331	7	55	Defeated Chiefs in final

==== Notes ====
^1 Teams were awarded four points for a bye during the Super Rugby seasons from 2011 to 2013. Each team took two bye rounds each season. These additional 8 points are included in their season points tally.
^2 All matches after Round 7 were cancelled. the season remained incomplete and no champion was awarded.
^3 Super Rugby Aotearoa was announced as a stand-in replacement competition for Super Rugby, between New Zealand Super Rugby sides. It was played as a round robin competition, with no finals. All teams played the other four teams twice, with the title awarded to the highest ranked team at the conclusion of the round robin fixtures. The final round match between the Crusaders and Blues was cancelled due to Covid-19 restrictions, with each team receiving 2 competition points.
^4 Super Rugby Aotearoa adopted the same format in 2021 as the inaugural tournament in 2020, with the addition of a final between the top two ranked teams at the conclusion of the round robin stage.
^5 Super Rugby Trans Tasman was a crossover competition between the teams involved in Super Rugby Aotearoa and Super Rugby AU. Each team from Super Rugby AU played each team from Super Rugby Aotearoa once, and vice versa. A final was played between the top two seeded teams at the conclusion of the round robin matches.

=== Results per opposition ===
Blues Super Rugby results vs different opponents

Super Rugby
Opposition	Span	Played	Won	Drawn	Lost	Win%
(New Zealand) Chiefs	1996–2024	42	18	1	23	42.8%
(New Zealand) Crusaders	1996–2024	45	13	0	32	28.8%
(New Zealand) Highlanders	1996–2024	45	28	0	17	62.2%
(New Zealand) Hurricanes	1996–2024	42	21	1	20	50.0%
(Australia) Brumbies	1996–2024	30	19	0	11	63.3%
(Australia) Force	2006–2024	15	13	1	1	86.6%
(Australia) Rebels	2011–2024	11	8	0	3	72.7%
(Australia) Reds	1996–2024	28	15	2	11	53.5%
(Australia) Waratahs	1996–2024	30	22	0	8	73.3%
(South Africa) Bulls	1996–2020	23	14	2	7	60.9%
(South Africa) Cheetahs	1997–2017	11	8	0	3	72.7%
(South Africa) Lions	1996–2020	22	15	0	7	68.2%
(South Africa) Sharks	1996–2019	25	9	0	16	36.0%
(South Africa) Southern Kings	2016	1	1	0	0	100.0%
(South Africa) Stormers	1996–2020	22	12	0	10	54.5%
(Argentina) Jaguares	2016–2019	3	1	0	2	33.3%
(Japan) Sunwolves	2017–2019	3	2	0	1	66.7%
(Fiji) Fijian Drua	2022-2024	5	5	0	0	100.0%
(Samoa) (Tonga) Moana Pasifika	2022-2024	5	5	0	0	100.0%
Overall	1996–2024	406	227	7	172	55.9%
Updated to: 22 June 2024

=== Individual records ===
==== Most appearances ====
#	Player	Apps.	Span
1	Keven Mealamu	164	2000–2001; 2003–2015
2	Ofa Tuʻungafasi	153	2013−present
3	Jerome Kaino	139	2004−2012; 2014−2018
4	Tony Woodcock	137	2002–2012; 2014–2015
7	Rieko Ioane	128	2016–2025
8	Patrick Tuipulotu	125	2013–2020; 2022–present
5	Akira Ioane	119	2015–2024
6	James Parsons	115	2012–2021
9	Ali Williams	102	2002−2013
10	John Afoa	101	2004–2011

==== Most points ====
#	Player	Pts.	Span
1	Adrian Cashmore	639	1996–2000
2	Carlos Spencer	630	1996–2005
3	Luke McAlister	391	2004–2007; 2010–2011
4	Stephen Perofeta	357	2017–present
5	Ihaia West	350	2014−2017
6	Beauden Barrett	311	2020; 2022–2023; 2025
7	Otere Black	304	2018−2021
8	Rieko Ioane	280	2016−2025
9	Doug Howlett	275	1999−2007
10	Harry Plummer	247	2019–2025
11	Joeli Vidiri	235	1996−2001

==== Most tries ====
#	Player	Tries	Span
1	Rieko Ioane	56	2016–2025
2	Doug Howlett	55	1999–2007
3	Joeli Vidiri	47	1996–2001
4	Mark Tele'a	41	2020–2025
5	Joe Rokocoko	38	2003–2011
6	Caleb Clarke	32	2018–present
7	Hoskins Sotutu	31	2019–present
8	Akira Ioane	29	2015–2024
9	Rene Ranger	28	2009–2013, 2016–2017
10	Carlos Spencer	25	1996–2005

==== Most points in a match ====
#	Player	Pts.	Opposition	Year
1	Gareth Anscombe	29	Bulls	2012
2	Adrian Cashmore	27	Highlanders	1998
3	Stephen Brett	26	Lions	2010
4	Beauden Barrett	25	Highlanders	2023
5	Adrian Cashmore	24	Bulls	1998
6	Carlos Spencer	23	Western Province	1996
6	Nick Evans	23	Highlanders	2008

==== Most tries in a match ====
Tries	Player	Opposition	Year
4	Joeli Vidiri	Bulls	2000
4	Doug Howlett	Hurricanes	2002
4	Mils Muliaina	Bulls	2002
4	Rieko Ioane	Sunwolves	2019
4	Mark Tele'a	Hurricanes	2023
3	Joeli Vidiri	Waratahs	1996
3	Mark Carter	Stormers	1998
3	Rupeni Caucaunibuca	Crusaders	2004
3	Rua Tipoki	Western Force	2006
3	Joe Rokocoko	Cheetahs	2008
3	Joe Rokocoko	Western Force	2010
3	Frank Halai	Melbourne Rebels	2013
3	Rieko Ioane	Melbourne Rebels	2017
3	Mark Tele'a	Waratahs	2020
3	Bryce Heem	Waratahs	2021
3	Hoskins Sotutu	Highlanders	2024
3	Caleb Clarke	Chiefs	2024

==== Most points in a season ====
#	Player	Pts.	Year
1	Adrian Cashmore	180	1998
2	Adrian Cashmore	164	1997
3	Nick Evans	150	2008
4	Carlos Spencer	143	2003
5	Stephen Brett	138	2010
6	Luke McAlister	137	2011
7	Otere Black	133	2021
8	Ihaia West	130	2016
9	Stephen Perofeta	129	2022
10	Simon Hickey	124	2014

==== Most tries in a season ====
Tries	Player	Year
12	Doug Howlett	2003
12	Mark Tele'a	2023
12	Hoskins Sotutu	2024
11	Rieko Ioane	2017
10	Joeli Vidiri	1996
10	Joeli Vidiri	1997
10	Joeli Vidiri	1998
10	Doug Howlett	2002
10	Frank Halai	2013
10	Caleb Clarke	2024

=== Team records ===
- Highest regular season placing: 1st (1996, 1997, 1998, 2003, 2022)
- Most wins in a season: 16 (2024)
- Most points in a season: 599 (2024)
- Most tries in a season: 87 (2024)
- Fewest wins in a season: 3 (2015)
- Fewest points in a season: 202 (1999)
- Fewest tries in a season: 15 (1999)
- Biggest win: 60–7 (53 point win in 2002 vs. Hurricanes, Wellington)
- Biggest loss: 12–59 (47 point loss in 2012 vs. Crusaders, Christchurch)
- Most points ever scored in a game: 74 (74–28 win in 1998 vs. Stormers, Auckland)
- Fewest points ever scored in a game: 3 (3–20 loss in 2004 vs. Reds, Brisbane), (3–23 loss in 2013 vs. Crusaders, Christchurch)

=== All-time record ===
- Games played: 290
- Games won: 154
- Games lost: 131
- Games drawn: 5
- Winning percentage: 53.10%
- Points for: 7750
- Points against: 6983
- Tries for: 922
- Tries conceded: 767

Record updated as of Round 9 v Brumbies, 2017

=== Players that have represented the All Blacks ===
87 officially recognised Blues players have gone on to represent the All Blacks as of the 2017 season. There have been a total of 268 players to have played for the Blues which means that 30% of all Blues over two decades have either represented the All Blacks or have gone on to represent them.

- John Afoa (36 tests, 2 matches)
- Ben Atiga (1 test)
- Norm Berryman (1 test)
- Andrew Blowers (11 tests, 7 matches)
- Anthony Boric (24 tests, 1 match)
- Daniel Braid (6 tests)
- Robin Brooke (62 tests, 7 matches)
- Zinzan Brooke (58 tests, 42 matches)
- Olo Brown (56 tests, 13 matches)
- Mark Carter (7 tests, 3 matches)
- Adrian Cashmore (2 tests)
- Caleb Clarke (5 tests)
- Eroni Clarke (10 tests, 14 matches)
- Greg Cooper (7 tests)
- Jimmy Cowan (51 tests, 2 matches)
- Ron Cribb (15 tests)
- Chresten Davis (2 matches)
- Steve Devine (10 tests)
- Tom Donnelly (15 tests)
- Matt Duffie (2 matches)
- Craig Dowd (60 tests, 7 matches)
- Marc Ellis (8 tests, 12 matches)
- Tamati Ellison (4 tests, 1 match)
- Bryn Evans (2 tests)
- Nick Evans (16 tests)
- Charlie Faumuina (50 tests)
- Greg Feek (10 tests)
- Malakai Fekitoa (23 tests)
- Sean Fitzpatrick (92 tests, 36 matches)
- Troy Flavell (22 tests)
- Richard Fromont (10 matches)
- Rico Gear (19 tests, 1 match)
- Frank Halai (1 test)
- Alex Hodgman (4 tests)
- Shane Howarth (4 tests, 6 matches)
- Doug Howlett (62 tests, 1 match)
- Dillon Hunt (1 test, 1 match)
- Craig Innes (17 tests, 13 matches)
- Akira Ioane (2 tests, 1 match)
- Rieko Ioane (34 tests)
- Michael Jones (55 tests, 19 matches)
- Jerome Kaino (83 tests, 2 matches)
- Tanerau Latimer (5 tests, 1 match)
- Danny Lee (2 tests)
- Walter Little (50 tests, 25 matches)
- Jonah Lomu (63 tests, 10 matches)
- Keith Lowen (1 test)
- Steven Luatua (15 tests)
- Angus Macdonald (2 tests)
- Alby Mathewson (4 tests, 1 match)
- Mark Mayerhofler (6 tests)
- Luke McAlister (30 tests, 1 match)
- Keven Mealamu (132 tests, 1 match)
- Kees Meeuws (42 tests, 3 matches)
- Brad Mika (3 tests)
- Dylan Mika (7 tests, 1 match)
- George Moala (4 tests)
- Mils Muliaina (100 tests, 2 matches)
- Waisake Naholo (26 tests)
- Craig Newby (3 tests)
- Ma'a Nonu (103 tests, 1 match)
- Dalton Papalii (4 tests)
- James Parsons (2 tests)
- Tim Perry (6 tests, 2 matches)
- Charles Piutau (17 tests)
- Augustine Pulu (2 tests)
- Caleb Ralph (14 tests, 2 matches)
- Rene Ranger (6 tests)
- Greg Rawlinson (4 tests)
- Charles Riechelmann (6 tests, 4 matches)
- Mark Robinson (3 tests, 5 matches)
- Joe Rokocoko (68 tests, 1 match)
- Xavier Rush (8 tests)
- Francis Saili (2 tests)
- Carlos Spencer (35 tests, 9 matches)
- Benson Stanley (3 tests)
- Jeremy Stanley (3 matches)
- Lee Stensness (8 tests, 6 matches)
- Hoskins Sotutu (5 tests)
- Angus Taʻavao (14 tests)
- Saimone Taumoepeau (3 tests, 1 match)
- Glenn Taylor (1 test, 5 matches)
- Isaia Toeava (36 tests, 1 match)
- Ofisa Tonu'u (5 tests, 3 matches)
- Ofa Tuʻungafasi (39 tests)
- Karl Tu'inukuafe (17 tests)
- Mose Tuiali'i (9 tests, 1 match)
- Patrick Tuipulotu (35 tests)
- Anthony Tuitavake (6 tests, 1 match)
- Sam Tuitupou (9 tests)
- Joeli Vidiri (2 tests)
- Piri Weepu (71 tests, 2 matches)
- Ali Williams (77 tests, 1 match)
- Sonny Bill Williams (58 tests)
- Royce Willis (12 tests)
- Derren Witcombe (5 tests)
- Tony Woodcock (118 tests)
- Rudi Wulf (4 tests)

== Notes ==
Preceded by Inaugural champions 2002 – Crusaders	Super 12 Champions; 1996 (first title) – 1997 (second title); 2003 (third title)	Succeeded by 1998 – Crusaders; 2004 – Brumbies
