= 1999 Super 12 season =

Men's rugby union club competition

1999 Super 12
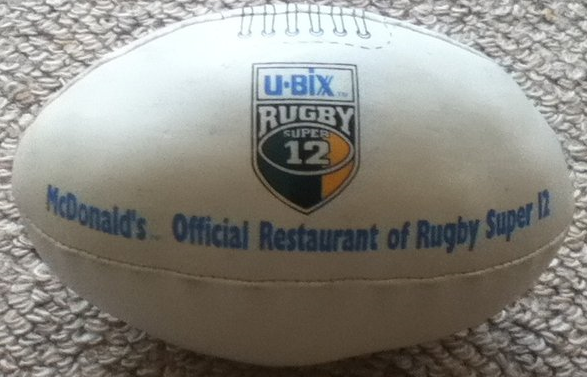
- McDonald's Super 12 rugby ball, 1999
- Countries: Australia; South Africa; New Zealand
- Tournament format(s): Round-robin and knockout
- Champions: (New Zealand) Canterbury Crusaders (2nd title)
- Matches played: 69
- Top point scorer(s): Andrew Mehrtens (192) (Canterbury Crusaders)
- Top try scorer(s): Joe Roff (8) (ACT Brumbies)

The 1999 Super 12 season was the fourth season of the Super 12, an annual rugby union competition contested by teams from Australia, New Zealand and South Africa. The season ran from February to May 1999, with each team playing all the others once. At the end of the regular season, the top four teams entered the playoff semi-finals, with the first placed team playing the fourth and the second placed team playing the third. The winner of each semi-final qualified for the final, which was contested by the Canterbury Crusaders and the Otago Highlanders at Carisbrook, Dunedin. The Crusaders won 24–19 to win their second Super 12 title.

== Teams ==
The 1999 Super 12 competition consisted of 12 teams: four from South Africa, three from Australia and five from New Zealand.

- ACT Brumbies (Australia)
- Auckland Blues (New Zealand)
- Canterbury Crusaders (New Zealand)
- Cats (South Africa)
- Bulls (South Africa)
- Otago Highlanders (New Zealand)
- Queensland Reds (Australia)
- Sharks (South Africa)
- Stormers (South Africa)
- Waikato Chiefs (New Zealand)
- Waratahs (Australia)
- Wellington Hurricanes (New Zealand)

== Table ==
Key to colours
Top four teams advance to playoffs

Pos	Team	Pld	W	D	L	PF	PA	PD	BP	Pts
1	(Australia) Queensland Reds	11	8	1	2	233	170	+63	2	36
2	(South Africa) Stormers	11	8	0	3	290	244	+46	4	36
3	(New Zealand) Otago Highlanders	11	8	0	3	280	203	+77	3	35
4	(New Zealand) Canterbury Crusaders	11	7	1	3	324	262	+62	3	33
5	(Australia) ACT Brumbies	11	5	0	6	278	195	+83	8	28
6	(New Zealand) Waikato Chiefs	11	5	0	6	248	301	−53	6	26
7	(South Africa) Sharks	11	5	1	5	241	232	+9	3	25
8	(Australia) Waratahs	11	4	1	6	246	248	−2	6	24
9	(New Zealand) Auckland Blues	11	4	1	6	202	201	+1	5	23
10	(New Zealand) Wellington Hurricanes	11	4	1	6	213	226	−13	4	22
11	(South Africa) Cats	11	4	0	7	312	341	−29	6	22
12	(South Africa) Bulls	11	1	0	10	203	447	−244	3	7

== Results ==
=== Round 1 ===
26 February 1999

Cats (South Africa)	33–22	(Australia) ACT Brumbies
Try: Venter; Small; Con: Engelbrecht; Pen: Engelbrecht (7)		Try: Penalty try Hardy; Mortlock; Con: Mortlock (2); Pen: Mortlock

Ellis Park, Johannesburg
Referee: Paddy O'Brien (New Zealand)

26 February 1999

Canterbury Crusaders (New Zealand)	48–3	(New Zealand) Waikato Chiefs
Try: So'oalo; Gibson; Kerr; Robertson; Lancaster; Con: Mehrtens (4); Pen: Mehrtens (5)		Pen: Feeney

Jade Stadium, Christchurch
Referee: Paul Honiss (New Zealand)

27 February 1999

Sharks (South Africa)	13–13	(Australia) Waratahs
Try: Fyvie; Con: Benade; Pen: Benade (2)		Try: Whitaker; Warner; Pen: Warner

Kings Park Stadium, Durban
Referee: Colin Hawke (New Zealand)

27 February 1999

Northern Bulls (South Africa)	19–42	(South Africa) Stormers
Try: Venter; Con: Smith; Pen: Smith (4)		Try: Rossouw (2); Fleck; Con: Van Straaten (3); Pen: Van Straaten (7)

Loftus Versfeld, Pretoria
Referee: Jonathan Kaplan (South Africa)

27 February 1999

Queensland Reds (Australia)	11–0	(New Zealand) Wellington Hurricanes
Try: Williams; Pen: Spooner (2)

Ballymore Stadium, Brisbane
Referee: Andre Watson (South Africa)

27 February 1999

Otago Highlanders (New Zealand)	19–13	(New Zealand) Auckland Blues
Try: Kelleher; Con: Brown; Pen: Brown		Try: Spencer; Con: Cashmore; Pen: Cashmore (2)

Carisbrook, Dunedin
Referee: Steve Walsh (New Zealand)

=== Round 2 ===
5 March 1999

Sharks (South Africa)	21–16	(Australia) ACT Brumbies
Try: Gillingham; Terblanche; Con: Honiball; Pen: Honiball (3)		Try: Penalty try Con: Mortlock; Pen: Mortlock (3)

Boet Erasmus Stadium, Port Elizabeth
Referee: Steve Walsh (New Zealand)

5 March 1999

Auckland Blues (New Zealand)	16–22	(New Zealand) Canterbury Crusaders
Try: Vidiri (2); Con: Spencer (2)		Try: Marshall; Con: Mehrtens; Pen: Mehrtens (5)

Eden Park, Auckland
Referee: Paul Honiss (New Zealand)

6 March 1999

Cats (South Africa)	10–39	(Australia) Waratahs
Try: Venter; Con: Engelbrecht; Pen: Engelbrecht		Try: McRae; Jones-Hughes; Dowling; Grey; Bowman; Con: Warner (2); Edmonds (2); Pen: Warner; Edmonds

Free State Stadium, Bloemfontein
Referee: Paul Macfie (New Zealand)

6 March 1999

Waikato Chiefs (New Zealand)	17–19	(Australia) Queensland Reds
Try: Duggan; Pen: Cooper (4)		Try: Smith; Connors; Waugh; Con: Spooner (2)

Waikato Stadium, Hamilton
Attendance: 9,000
Referee: Andrew Turner (South Africa)

6 March 1999

Otago Highlanders (New Zealand)	65–23	(South Africa) Northern Bulls
Try: Timmins; Kelleher (2); Maka; Wilson; Stanley (2); Middleton; Ropati; Con: Brown (7); Pen: Brown (2)		Try: Van Wyk; Ribbens (2); Raubenheimer; Pen: Smith

Rugby Park Stadium, Invercargill
Referee: Stuart Dickinson (Australia)

7 March 1999

Wellington Hurricanes (New Zealand)	22–24	(South Africa) Stormers
Try: Telea; Heaps; Pen: Holwell (4)		Try: Leonard; Marais; Rossouw; Pen: Van Straaten (3)

Athletic Park, Wellington
Referee: Peter Marshall (Australia)

=== Round 3 ===
12 March 1999

Otago Highlanders (New Zealand)	46–14	(South Africa) Stormers
Try: Lima; Kelleher; Maka; Kronfeld; Middleton; Alatini; Ropati (2); Con: Brown (3)		Try: Daniels; Pen: Koen (3)

Carisbrook, Dunedin
Referee: Andrew Cole (Australia)

12 March 1999

Queensland Reds (Australia)	19–18	(Australia) ACT Brumbies
Try: Herbert; Con: Spooner; Pen: Spooner (4)		Try: Williams (2); Con: Mortlock; Pen: Mortlock (2)

Ballymore Stadium, Brisbane
Referee: Peter Marshall (Australia)

13 March 1999

Cats (South Africa)	20–36	(South Africa) Sharks
Try: Van der Walt; Venter; Con: O'Neill (2); Pen: O'Neill (2)		Try: Slade; Brink; Atherton; Con: Honiball (3); Pen: Honiball (5)

Ellis Park, Johannesburg
Referee: Mark Lawrence (South Africa)

13 March 1999

Wellington Hurricanes (New Zealand)	37–18	(South Africa) Northern Bulls
Try: Cullen (2); Tonu'u; Umaga; Con: Holwell; Pen: Holwell (5)		Try: Esterhuizen; Bekker; Con: Smith; Pen: Smith (2)

Arena Manawatu, Palmerston North
Referee: Scott Young (Australia)

13 March 1999

Waratahs (Australia)	36–30	(New Zealand) Waikato Chiefs
Try: Warner; Dowling; Brial; Kearns; Strauss; Con: Warner; Pen: Warner (2)		Try: Marsh; Randle; Little; Con: Cooper (3); Pen: Cooper (3)

Sydney Football Stadium, Sydney
Referee: Andre Watson (South Africa)

=== Round 4 ===
19 March 1999

ACT Brumbies (Australia)	37–15	(South Africa) Stormers
Try: Roff (3); Gregan; McInally; Con: Mortlock (3); Pen: Mortlock (2)	Report	Try: Paulse; Hattingh; Con: Montgomery; Pen: Van Straaten

Canberra Stadium, Canberra

19 March 1999

Canterbury Crusaders (New Zealand)	18–18	(New Zealand) Wellington Hurricanes

Jade Stadium, Christchurch

20 March 1999

Waratahs (Australia)	39–23	(South Africa) Northern Bulls

Sydney Football Stadium, Sydney

20 March 1999

Auckland Blues (New Zealand)	12–12	(Australia) Queensland Reds
Pen: Adrian Cashmore (4)		Pen: Nathan Spooner (4)

North Harbour Stadium, Albany
Attendance: 16,000

20 March 1999

Cats (South Africa)	28–29	(New Zealand) Otago Highlanders

Ellis Park Stadium, Johannesburg

=== Round 5 ===
26 March 1999

Sharks (South Africa)	32–8	(New Zealand) Otago Highlanders

Kings Park Stadium, Durban

26 March 1999

Waikato Chiefs (New Zealand)	18–29	(New Zealand) Auckland Blues

Waikato Stadium, Hamilton

26 March 1999

Waratahs (Australia)	18–28	(South Africa) Stormers

Sydney Football Stadium, Sydney

27 March 1999

Cats (South Africa)	43–27	(New Zealand) Wellington Hurricanes

Free State Stadium, Bloemfontein

27 March 1999

Canterbury Crusaders (New Zealand)	23–36	(Australia) Queensland Reds

Jade Stadium, Christchurch

27 March 1999

ACT Brumbies (Australia)	73–9	(South Africa) Northern Bulls
Try: Rod Kafer (2); Joe Roff (2); George Gregan (2); Stephen Larkham; Jim Williams; Mark Bartholomeusz; Gordon Falcon; Con: Joe Roff (3); Stephen Larkham (4); Pen: Joe Roff (2); Stirling Mortlock	Report	Pen: Franco Smith (3)

Canberra Stadium, Canberra
Attendance: 4,000

=== Round 6 ===
2 April 1999

ACT Brumbies (Australia)	21–28	(New Zealand) Canterbury Crusaders
Try: Joe Roff; Mitch Hardy; George Gregan; Pen: Joe Roff (2)	Report	Try: Afato So'oalo; Con: Andrew Mehrtens; Pen: Andrew Mehrtens (6); Drop: Andrew Mehrtens

Canberra Stadium, Canberra

3 April 1999

Waikato Chiefs (New Zealand)	16–27	(New Zealand) Otago Highlanders

Rotorua International Stadium, Rotorua

3 April 1999

Waratahs (Australia)	20–21	(New Zealand) Auckland Blues

Sydney Football Stadium, Sydney

3 April 1999

Cats (South Africa)	57–24	(South Africa) Northern Bulls

Ellis Park, Johannesburg

3 April 1999

Stormers (South Africa)	35–14	(Australia) Queensland Reds

Newlands Stadium, Cape Town
Attendance: 30,000

3 April 1999

Sharks (South Africa)	18–34	(New Zealand) Wellington Hurricanes

Buffalo City Stadium, East London

=== Round 7 ===
9 April 1999

Otago Highlanders (New Zealand)	23–6	(New Zealand) Canterbury Crusaders

Carisbrook, Dunedin

9 April 1999

Northern Bulls (South Africa)	7–17	(Australia) Queensland Reds

Bosman Stadium, Brakpan

10 April 1999

Auckland Blues (New Zealand)	23–7	(New Zealand) Wellington Hurricanes

Eden Park, Auckland

10 April 1999

ACT Brumbies (Australia)	13–16	(New Zealand) Waikato Chiefs
Try: Joe Roff; Con: Joe Roff; Pen: Joe Roff (2)	Report	Try: Scott McLeod; Con: Glen Jackson; Pen: Glen Jackson; Matthew Cooper

Canberra Stadium, Canberra

10 April 1999

Stormers (South Africa)	35–19	(South Africa) Sharks

Newlands Stadium, Cape Town
Attendance: 47,315

=== Round 8 ===
16 April 1999

Wellington Hurricanes (New Zealand)	21–24	(New Zealand) Waikato Chiefs

Yarrow Stadium, New Plymouth

17 April 1999

Sharks (South Africa)	29–0	(South Africa) Northern Bulls

Kings Park Stadium, Durban

17 April 1999

Queensland Reds (Australia)	19–20	(New Zealand) Otago Highlanders

Ballymore Stadium, Brisbane

17 April 1999

ACT Brumbies (Australia)	27–16	(Australia) Waratahs
Try: Adam Magro; Craig McMullen; Jeremy Paul; Con: Stirling Mortlock (3); Pen: Stirling Mortlock (2)	Report	Try: Matthew Dowling; Scott Staniforth; Pen: Matthew Dowling (2)

Canberra Stadium, Canberra

17 April 1999

Auckland Blues (New Zealand)	24–11	(South Africa) Cats

Eden Park, Auckland

18 April 1999

Stormers (South Africa)	28–19	(New Zealand) Canterbury Crusaders

Newlands Stadium, Cape Town
Attendance: 48,000

=== Round 9 ===
23 April 1999

Otago Highlanders (New Zealand)	15–23	(Australia) Waratahs

Carisbrook, Dunedin

24 April 1999

Northern Bulls (South Africa)	28–30	(New Zealand) Canterbury Crusaders

Loftus Versfeld, Pretoria

24 April 1999

Auckland Blues (New Zealand)	6–12	(South Africa) Sharks
Pen: Adrian Cashmore (2)		Pen: Henry Honiball (4)

Eden Park, Auckland

24 April 1999

Waikato Chiefs (New Zealand)	44–42	(South Africa) Cats

Growers Stadium, Pukekohe

25 April 1999

Wellington Hurricanes (New Zealand)	13–21	(Australia) ACT Brumbies
Try: David Holwell; Con: David Holwell; Pen: David Holwell (2)	Report	Try: Stirling Mortlock; George Gregan; Con: Stirling Mortlock; Pen: Stirling Mortlock (3)

Athletic Park, Wellington

=== Round 10 ===
30 April 1999

Waikato Chiefs (New Zealand)	32–19	(South Africa) Sharks

Waikato Stadium, Hamilton

1 May 1999

Stormers (South Africa)	37–23	(New Zealand) Auckland Blues

Newlands Stadium, Cape Town
Attendance: 49,000

1 May 1999

Waratahs (Australia)	13–30	(Australia) Queensland Reds

Sydney Football Stadium, Sydney

1 May 1999

Otago Highlanders (New Zealand)	9–8	(Australia) ACT Brumbies
Pen: Tony Brown (3)	Report	Try: Patricio Noriega; Pen: Stirling Mortlock

Carisbrook, Dunedin

2 May 1999

Canterbury Crusaders (New Zealand)	58–38	(South Africa) Cats

Trafalgar Park, Nelson
Attendance: 13,000

=== Round 11 ===
7 May 1999

Wellington Hurricanes (New Zealand)	13–7	(Australia) Waratahs

McLean Park, Napier

8 May 1999

Northern Bulls (South Africa)	21–19	(New Zealand) Auckland Blues
Try: Jacques Olivier, penalty try Con: Casper Steyn; Pen: Casper Steyn (3)		Try: Marc Ellis; Con: Adrian Cashmore; Pen: Adrian Cashmore (4)

Atlantic Stadium, Witbank
Attendance: 10,000

8 May 1999

Queensland Reds (Australia)	22–12	(South Africa) Cats

Ballymore Stadium, Brisbane

8 May 1999

Stormers (South Africa)	16–9	(New Zealand) Waikato Chiefs
Try: Dan van Zyl; Con: Braam van Straaten; Pen: Braam van Straaten (3)		Pen: Glen Jackson (3)

Newlands Stadium, Cape Town
Attendance: 49,170

9 May 1999

Canterbury Crusaders (New Zealand)	34–29	(South Africa) Sharks

Jade Stadium, Christchurch

=== Round 12 ===
14 May 1999

Northern Bulls (South Africa)	31–39	(New Zealand) Waikato Chiefs

Loftus Versfeld, Pretoria

14 May 1999

Queensland Reds (Australia)	34–13	(South Africa) Sharks

Ballymore Stadium, Brisbane

14 May 1999

Auckland Blues (New Zealand)	16–22	(Australia) ACT Brumbies
Try: Spencer; McFarland; Pen: Cashmore (2)	Report	Try: Roff; Tanivula; Kafer; Paul; Con: Roff

Eden Park, Auckland

15 May 1999

Stormers (South Africa)	16–18	(South Africa) Cats

Newlands Stadium, Cape Town
Attendance: 49,725

15 May 1999

Waratahs (Australia)	22–38	(New Zealand) Canterbury Crusaders

Sydney Football Stadium, Sydney

15 May 1999

Wellington Hurricanes (New Zealand)	21–19	(New Zealand) Otago Highlanders

Athletic Park, Wellington

== Finals ==
=== Semi finals ===
22 May 1999

Queensland Reds (Australia)	22–28	(New Zealand) Canterbury Crusaders
Try: Horan; Con: Spooner; Pen: Spooner (5)		Try: Ralph; Feek; MacDonald; Robertson; Con: Mehrtens; Pen: Mehrtens (2)

Ballymore Stadium, Brisbane
Referee: Andre Watson (South Africa)

23 May 1999

Stormers (South Africa)	18–33	(New Zealand) Otago Highlanders
Try: Paulse; Marais; Con: Van Straaten; Pen: Van Straaten (2)		Try: Lima; Kelleher; Ropati; Randell; Con: Brown (2); Pen: Brown (3)

Newlands Stadium, Cape Town
Attendance: 50,000
Referee: Peter Marshall (Australia)

=== Grand final ===
30 May 1999

Otago Highlanders (New Zealand)	19–24	(New Zealand) Canterbury Crusaders
Try: Lima; Maka; Pen: Brown (2); Drop: Laney		Try: So'oalo; Gibson; Con: Mehrtens; Pen: Mehrtens (3); Drop: Mehrtens

Carisbrook, Dunedin
Attendance: 41,500
Referee: Andre Watson (South Africa)

Highlanders	Crusaders
