= 1999 Chiefs (Super Rugby) season =

Chiefs
- 1999 season
- Head coach: Ross Cooper
- Captain: Michael Collins
- Stadium: Waikato Stadium, Hamilton; Rotorua International Stadium, Rotorua; ECOLight Stadium, Pukekohe (Growers Stadium)
- Placing: 6th
- Record: Won 5, Lost 6
- Top try scorer: All: - (-)
- Top points scorer: All: - (-)

1999 was another tough year for the Waikato Chiefs rugby team in the Super 12 Tournament. This year winning 5 of their 11 games and finished 6th overall on the table, this year the team was coached by Ross Cooper and captained by Michael Collins.

== Standing ==
	Team	Pld	W	D	L	PF	PA	PD	BP	Pts
1	(Australia) Queensland Reds	11	8	1	2	233	170	+63	2	36
2	(South Africa) Stormers	11	8	0	3	290	244	+46	4	36
3	(New Zealand) Otago Highlanders	11	8	0	3	280	203	+77	3	35
4	(New Zealand) Canterbury Crusaders	11	7	1	3	324	262	+62	3	33
5	(Australia) ACT Brumbies	11	5	0	6	278	195	+83	8	28
6	(New Zealand) Waikato Chiefs	11	5	0	6	248	301	−53	6	26
7	(South Africa) Sharks	11	5	1	5	241	232	+9	3	25
8	(Australia) Waratahs	11	4	1	6	246	248	−2	6	24
9	(New Zealand) Auckland Blues	11	4	1	6	202	201	+1	5	23
10	(New Zealand) Wellington Hurricanes	11	4	1	6	213	226	−13	4	22
11	(South Africa) Cats	11	4	0	7	312	341	−29	6	22
12	(South Africa) Northern Bulls	11	1	0	10	203	447	−244	3	7

== Results ==
Round 1	26 February 1999	Canterbury Crusaders (New Zealand)	48 – 3	(New Zealand) Waikato Chiefs	Jade Stadium, Christchurch
		Try: Afato So'oalo, Daryl Gibson, James Kerr, Scott Robertson, Steve Lancaster; Con: Andrew Mehrtens (4); Pen: Andrew Mehrtens (5)		Pen: Blair Feeney	Referee: (New Zealand) Paul Honiss

Round 2	6 March 1999	Waikato Chiefs (New Zealand)	17 – 19	(Australia) Queensland Reds	Waikato Stadium, Hamilton
		Try: Rhys Duggan; Pen: Matt Cooper (4)		Try: Damien Smith, Mark Connors, Warwick Waugh; Con: Nathan Spooner (2)	Referee: (South Africa) Andrew Turner

Round 3	13 March 1999	Waratahs (Australia)	36 – 30	(New Zealand) Waikato Chiefs	Sydney Football Stadium, Sydney
		Try: Christian Warner, Matthew Dowling, Michael Brial, Phil Kearns, Tiaan Strauss; Con: Christian Warner; Pen: Christian Warner (2)		Try: Glen Marsh, Roger Randle, Walter Little; Con: Matt Cooper (3); Pen: Matt Cooper (3)	Referee: (South Africa) André Watson

Round 5	26 March 1999	Waikato Chiefs (New Zealand)	18 – 29	(New Zealand) Auckland Blues	Waikato Stadium, Hamilton
		Try: Walter Little, Dylan Mika; Con: Matt Cooper; Pen: Matt Cooper (2)		Try: Xavier Rush, Rua Tipoki; Con: Adrian Cashmore (2); Pen: Adrian Cashmore (4); Drop: Carlos Spencer

Round 6	3 April 1999	Waikato Chiefs (New Zealand)	16 – 27	(New Zealand) Otago Highlanders	Rotorua International Stadium, Rotorua

Round 7	10 April 1999	ACT Brumbies (Australia)	13 – 16	(New Zealand) Waikato Chiefs	Canberra Stadium, Canberra

Round 8	16 April 1999	Wellington Hurricanes (New Zealand)	21 – 24	(New Zealand) Waikato Chiefs	Yarrow Stadium, New Plymouth

Round 9	24 April 1999	Waikato Chiefs (New Zealand)	44 – 42	(South Africa) Cats	Growers Stadium, Pukekohe

Round 10	30 April 1999	Waikato Chiefs (New Zealand)	32 – 19	(South Africa) Sharks	Waikato Stadium, Hamilton

Round 11	8 May 1999	Stormers (South Africa)	16 – 9	(New Zealand) Waikato Chiefs	Newlands Stadium, Cape Town
					Attendance: 49,170

Round 12	14 May 1999	Northern Bulls (South Africa)	31 – 39	(New Zealand) Waikato Chiefs	Loftus Versfeld, Pretoria

== Notes and references ==
http://www.sanzarrugby.com/superrugby/match-centre/?historicalView=1&season=1999&competition=205&match=599053 (BLUES VS CHIEFS GAME, 26 March 1999)
