= 1997 Chiefs (Super Rugby) season =

Chiefs
- 1997 season
- Head coach: Brad Meurant
- Captain: Ian Jones
- Stadium: Waikato Stadium, Hamilton; Owen Delany Park, Taupo; North Harbour Stadium, Albany
- Placing: 11th
- Record: Won 4, Lost 7
- Top try scorer: All: Eric Rush (6)
- Top points scorer: All: Matthew Cooper (106)

1997 was a tough year for the Waikato Chiefs rugby team in the Super 12 Tournament. They won 4 of their 11 games and finished 10th overall on the table, this year the team was coached by Brad Meurant and captain by Ian Jones.

== Standing ==
Pos.	Team	Pld	W	D	L	PF	PA	PD	BP	Pts
1	(New Zealand) Auckland Blues	11	10	1	0	435	283	152	8	50
2	(Australia) ACT Brumbies	11	8	0	3	406	291	115	9	41
3	(New Zealand) Wellington Hurricanes	11	6	0	5	416	314	102	10	34
4	(South Africa) Sharks	11	5	2	4	321	350	−29	6	30
5	(South Africa) Gauteng Lions	11	5	1	5	302	346	−44	6	28
6	(New Zealand) Canterbury Crusaders	11	5	1	5	272	235	37	4	26
7	(South Africa) Free State	11	5	0	6	301	327	−26	5	25
8	(South Africa) Northern Transvaal	11	3	3	5	264	342	−78	4	22
9	(Australia) NSW Waratahs	11	4	0	7	255	296	−41	4	20
10	(Australia) Queensland Reds	11	4	0	7	263	318	−55	4	20
11	(New Zealand) Waikato Chiefs	11	4	0	7	272	295	−23	3	19
12	(New Zealand) Otago Highlanders	11	3	0	8	299	409	−110	5	17

== Coaching staff ==
Job	Name
Coach	Brad Meurant
Assistant coach	John Boe
Manager	Steve Gilbert
Physio	Dennis Shepherd
Physio	Chris McCullough
Doctor	Chris Milne
Doctor	Steve Reid
Trainer	Peter White

== Results ==
Round 1	28 February 1997	Wellington Hurricanes (New Zealand)	18 – 23	(New Zealand) Waikato Chiefs	The Showgrounds, Palmerston North
		Try: Jarrod Cunningham, Tana Umaga; Con: Jon Preston; Pen: Jon Preston (2)	Scoreboard	Try: Eric Rush, Glen Osborne, Walter Little; Con: Matthew Cooper; Pen: Matthew Cooper (2)	Referee: (New Zealand) Colin Hawke

Round 2	8 March 1997	NSW Waratahs (Australia)	26 – 33	(New Zealand) Waikato Chiefs	Sydney Football Stadium, Sydney
		Try: Matt Burke, Richard Harry; Con: Matt Burke (2); Pen: Matt Burke (4)	Scoreboard	Try: Eric Rush (2), Errol Brain; Con: Matthew Cooper (3); Pen: Matthew Cooper (4)	Referee: (Australia) Andrew Cole

Round 3	15 March 1997	Waikato Chiefs (New Zealand)	16 – 26	(New Zealand) Auckland Blues	North Harbour Stadium, Albany
		Try: Scott McLeod; Con: Bruce Reihana; Pen: Bruce Reihana (2), Matt Cooper		Try: Joeli Vidiri, Zinzan Brooke, penalty try Con: Carlos Spencer; Pen: Carlos Spencer (2); Drop: Carlos Spencer	Attendance: 25,000; Referee: (New Zealand) Paddy O'Brien

Round 4	22 March 1997	Waikato Chiefs (New Zealand)	31 – 16	(Australia) Queensland Reds	Waikato Stadium, Hamilton
		Try: Bruce Reihana, Dion Matthews, Matt Cooper; Con: Matt Cooper (2); Pen: Matt Cooper (4)		Try: Ben Tune; Con: John Eales; Pen: John Eales (3)	Referee: (New Zealand) Colin Hawke

Round 5	29 March 1997	Canterbury Crusaders (New Zealand)	24 – 15	(New Zealand) Waikato Chiefs	Fraser Park, Timaru
		Try: Daryl Gibson, Kevin Nepia; Con: Andrew Mehrtens; Pen: Andrew Mehrtens (3); Drop: Andrew Mehrtens		Try: Paul Mitchell, Rhys Duggan; Con: Matt Cooper; Pen: Matt Cooper	Attendance: 8,500; Referee: (New Zealand) Glen Wahlstrom

Round 7	11 April 1997	Waikato Chiefs (New Zealand)	15 – 33	(South Africa) Sharks	North Harbour Stadium, Albany
		Try: Glen Osborne, Glenn Taylor; Con: Blair Feeney; Pen: Blair Feeney		Try: Adrian Garvey (2), Cabous van der Westhuisen; Con: Gavin Lawless (3); Pen: Gavin Lawless (4)	Referee: (New Zealand) Paddy O'Brien

Round 8	19 April 1997	Northern Transvaal (South Africa)	34 – 27	(New Zealand) Waikato Chiefs	Loftus Versfeld, Pretoria
		Try: Graeme Bouwer, Jacques Olivier (2), Nicky van der Walt; Con: Casper Steyn (4); Pen: Casper Steyn (2)		Try: Dean Anglesey, Glen Osborne; Con: Matt Cooper; Pen: Matt Cooper (5)	Referee: (South Africa) Ian Rogers

Round 9	26 April 1997	Free State (South Africa)	27 – 13	(New Zealand) Waikato Chiefs	Vodacom Park, Bloemfontein
		Try: Hendrik Jordaan Kruger, Jan-Harm van Wyk, Rassie Erasmus, Wybrand Els; Con: MJ Smith (2); Pen: MJ Smith		Try: Michael Collins; Con: Matt Cooper; Pen: Matt Cooper (2)	Referee: (South Africa) Tappe Henning

Round 10	3 May 1997	Waikato Chiefs (New Zealand)	47 – 9	(South Africa) Gauteng Lions	Waikato Stadium, Hamilton
		Try: Caleb Ralph (2), Deon Muir, Scott McLeod; Con: Matt Cooper (5); Pen: Matt Cooper (4)		Pen: Gavin Johnson (3)	Referee: (New Zealand) Paul Honiss

Round 11	9 May 1997	ACT Brumbies (Australia)	48 – 34	(New Zealand) Waikato Chiefs	Canberra Stadium, Canberra
		Try: George Gregan, Joe Roff (2), Mitch Hardy, Owen Finegan, Stephen Larkham, Troy Coker; Con: David Knox (5); Pen: David Knox		Try: Aaron Hopa, Eric Rush (3); Con: Ian Foster (4); Pen: Matt Cooper (2)	Attendance: 13,742; Referee: (Australia) Stuart Dickinson

Round 12	16 May 1997	Waikato Chiefs (New Zealand)	18 – 34	(New Zealand) Otago Highlanders	Owen Delany Park, Taupō
		Try: Caleb Ralph, Glenn Taylor; Con: Blair Feeney; Pen: Ian Foster (2)		Try: Doug Howlett (3); Con: Simon Culhane (2); Pen: Simon Culhane (4), Tony Brown	Attendance: 10,000; Referee: (New Zealand) Paul Honiss

== Squad ==
The Chiefs Squad for the 1997 Super 12 Season were:

1997 Chiefs Squad
**Props**: (New Zealand) Michael Collins; (New Zealand) **Richard Loe**; (New Zealand) Lee Lidgard; **Hookers**: (Fiji) **Greg Smith**; (New Zealand) Paul Mitchell; **Locks**: (New Zealand) **Ian Jones**; (New Zealand) **Glenn Taylor**	**Loose forwards**: (New Zealand) **Aaron Hopa**; (New Zealand) Deon Muir; (New Zealand) Errol Brain; (New Zealand) Dean Anglesey; (New Zealand) **Blair Larsen**; (New Zealand) Richard Coventry; (Wales) **Brett Sinkinson**; **Scrum-Halves**: (New Zealand) **Rhys Duggan**; (New Zealand) **Mark Robinson**; **Fly-halves**: (New Zealand) Ian Foster; (New Zealand) Blair Feeney	**Midfield**: (New Zealand) **Matthew Cooper**; (New Zealand) **Scott McLeod**; (New Zealand) **Frank Bunce**; (New Zealand) **Walter Little**; (New Zealand) **Pita Alatini**; **Wingers**: (New Zealand) **Eric Rush**; (New Zealand) **Caleb Ralph**; (New Zealand) Dion Matthews; (New Zealand) Damon Kaui; (New Zealand) **Bruce Reihana**; **Fullbacks**: (New Zealand) **Glen Osborne**
(c) denotes team captain, **Bold** denotes player is internationally capped.
