= 2004 Tri Nations Series =

Final positions
- Champions: South Africa (2nd title)
- Bledisloe Cup: New Zealand
- Freedom Cup: South Africa

Tournament statistics
- Matches played: 6
- Tries scored: 32 (5.33 per match)
- Attendance: 313,029 (52,172 per match)

The 2004 Tri Nations Series, an annual rugby union competition between the national teams of Australia, New Zealand and South Africa, was the ninth in the series. The competition is organised by SANZAR, a consortium of the three countries' rugby union federations. The series was contested in its original double round-robin format, with each team playing the others twice.

South Africa won the first ever Freedom Cup in a one-off home test against New Zealand. New Zealand retained the Bledisloe Cup against Australia.

== Synopsis ==
South Africa continued to nurture and develop its rich vein of talent during the Tri-Nations, a competition in which South Africa had not been competitive in three years. However, things were to be different this time as the Boks ploughed their way into the opposition, most notably with a herculean backline display that gave South Africa 10 of its glut of 13 tries in four Tri-Nations matches, as opposed to the All Blacks' much vaunted and feared backline's display of 4 in four games. South Africa's improved displays made for the tightest competition so far in the history of the Tri-Nations.

The Boks opener against the All Blacks was a thriller with Boks 'rush' defence rattling the Kiwis 'flat' attack to its core. After 80 minutes the Boks were ahead before a thrilling attack from the All Blacks claimed a last second try to win the game, courtesy of Doug Howlett. However, the Boks could take a lot out of this game and approached the Wallabies with a spring in their step. The Wallabies too caused South Africa heartache as ex South African under 21s captain Clyde Rathbone snatched the winner for the Aussies with minutes to go.

As the series shifted to South Africa, the Boks needed to beat the All Blacks in order to keep their hopes of a Tri-Nations title, a first since 1998, alive. They did so with vigour as they brushed aside the All Blacks with disdain, providing the authoritative finishing and poise which was lacking to a degree in the first game between the Southern rivals. The only area of the game in which New Zealand competed well was the scoreboard. After going 10–0 down early on South Africa went into the second half ahead, again. However, unlike the first game South Africa provided what they sought out to do with a strong second half display, as they pulled away from the All Blacks, 5 tries to 2. Bok centre Marius Joubert equalled an SA record for the most tries against the All Blacks in the process with a hat trick of tries.

This set up a winner-take-all battle against the Wallabies in Durban. The Boks fell behind 7–3 in a tightly played first half. In the second, they scored tries from forwards Victor Matfield and Joe van Niekerk. While the Wallabies got more tries (three), the difference proved to be the boot of fullback Percy Montgomery, who converted both Boks tries and kicked three penalties to give the Boks a 23–19 win and the Tri-Nations trophy. While the Boks had many heroes in their run through the Tri-Nations, perhaps the greatest was Schalk Burger, who more than lived up to his enormous promise and established himself as arguably the top flanker in the world.

== Aftermath ==
=== New Zealand ===
The 2004 Tri-Nations was a disappointing start to the tenures of the new All Blacks coaching staff. Many blamed New Zealand's failure in this tournament to a reliance on the so-called 'flat backline', and as backs coach Wayne Smith drew the brunt of the criticism. The All Black careers of ageing stars Carlos Spencer and Andrew Merhtens were effectively ended by a series of poor performances, and on the end of year tour to Europe Dan Carter emerged as the new first choice All Blacks first-five eighth.

=== South Africa ===
In this tournament, the Springboks definitively reemerged as a force in the professional era of rugby union. Going into the Tri Nations, South Africa rugby was in turmoil, best exemplified by the debacle of the 2003 World Cup and the scandal of Kamp Staaldraad. With the emergence of Schalk Burger, Jean de Villiers and Marius Joubert as major stars, the Boks used this momentum to become the 2004 IRB Team of the Year. South Africa would sweep the major IRB awards, as Burger earned IRB Player of the Year honours and coach Jake White was named IRB Coach of the Year.

== Format ==
As in past competitions, points were earned on the following schedule:

- 4 points for a win
- 2 points for a draw
- 0 points for a loss
- 1 bonus point for scoring 4 tries or more, (win, lose, or draw)
- 1 bonus point for a loss by 7 points or less

== Table ==
Nation	Games				Points			Bonus points	Table points
Nation	Played	Won	Drawn	Lost	For	Against	Difference	Bonus points	Table points
South Africa	4	2	0	2	110	98	+12	3	11
Australia	4	2	0	2	79	83	−4	2	10
New Zealand	4	2	0	2	83	91	−8	1	9

== Results ==
=== Round 1 ===
17 July 2004
19:35 NZST (UTC+12)

New Zealand	16–7	Australia
Try: Howlett; Con: Carter; Pen: Carter (3)		Try: Mortlock; Con: Giteau

Wellington Regional Stadium, Wellington
Attendance: 38,000
Referee: Alain Rolland (Ireland)

FB	15	Mils Muliaina
RW	14	Doug Howlett
OC	13	Tana Umaga (c)
IC	12	Dan Carter
LW	11	Joe Rokocoko
FH	10	Carlos Spencer
SH	9	Justin Marshall
N8	8	Xavier Rush
OF	7	Marty Holah
BF	6	Jono Gibbes
RL	5	Simon Maling
LL	4	Chris Jack
TP	3	Carl Hayman
HK	2	Keven Mealamu
LP	1	Kees Meeuws
Replacements:
HK	16	Andrew Hore
PR	17	Greg Somerville
FL	18	Jerry Collins
FL	19	Craig Newby
SH	20	Byron Kelleher
FH	21	Nick Evans
CE	22	Sam Tuitupou
Coach:
(New Zealand) Graham Henry

FB	15	Chris Latham
RW	14	Clyde Rathbone
OC	13	Stirling Mortlock
IC	12	Matt Giteau
LW	11	Lote Tuqiri
FH	10	Stephen Larkham
SH	9	Chris Whitaker
N8	8	David Lyons
OF	7	Phil Waugh
BF	6	Radike Samo
RL	5	Nathan Sharpe (c)
LL	4	Justin Harrison
TP	3	Al Baxter
HK	2	Brendan Cannon
LP	1	Bill Young
Replacements:
HK	16	Jeremy Paul
PR	17	Matt Dunning
LK	18	Dan Vickerman
FL	19	George Smith
SH	20	Matt Henjak
FB	21	Matt Burke
WG	22	Wendell Sailor
Coach:
Eddie Jones

=== Round 2 ===
24 July 2004
19:35 NZST (UTC+12)

New Zealand	23–21	South Africa (1 BP)
Try: Howlett; Pen: Carter (5); Carlos Spencer		Try: De Villiers; Cronjé du Preez; Con: Montgomery (3)

Lancaster Park, Christchurch
Attendance: 34,000
Referee: Andrew Cole (Australia)

FB	15	Mils Muliaina
RW	14	Doug Howlett
OC	13	Tana Umaga (c)
IC	12	Dan Carter
LW	11	Joe Rokocoko
FH	10	Carlos Spencer
SH	9	Justin Marshall
N8	8	Xavier Rush
OF	7	Marty Holah
BF	6	Jerry Collins
RL	5	Simon Maling
LL	4	Chris Jack
TP	3	Greg Somerville
HK	2	Keven Mealamu
LP	1	Kees Meeuws
Replacements:
HK	16	Andrew Hore
PR	17	Tony Woodcock
LK	18	Ali Williams
FL	19	Craig Newby
SH	20	Byron Kelleher
CE	21	Sam Tuitupou
FH	22	Nick Evans
Coach:
(New Zealand) Graham Henry

FB	15	Percy Montgomery
RW	14	Breyton Paulse
OC	13	Marius Joubert
IC	12	De Wet Barry
LW	11	Jean de Villiers
FH	10	Jaco van der Westhuyzen
SH	9	Fourie du Preez
N8	8	Jacques Cronjé
BF	7	AJ Venter
OF	6	Schalk Burger
RL	5	Albert van den Berg
LL	4	Bakkies Botha
TP	3	Eddie Andrews
HK	2	John Smit (c)
LP	1	Os du Randt
Replacements:
HK	16	Danie Coetzee
PR	17	Faan Rautenbach
LK	18	Quinton Davids
N8	19	Joe van Niekerk
SH	20	Bolla Conradie
FH	21	Gaffie du Toit
WG	22	Brent Russell
Coach:
Jake White

=== Round 3 ===
31 July 2004
18:00 AWST (UTC+08)

(1 BP) Australia	30–26	South Africa (1 BP)
Try: Tuqiri; Larkham; Latham; Rathbone; Con: Giteau; Burke; Pen: Giteau (2)		Try: Van der Westhuyzen; De Villiers; Du Toit; Con: Montgomery; Pen: Montgomery (3)

Subiaco Oval, Perth
Attendance: 42,507
Referee: Chris White (England)

FB	15	Chris Latham
RW	14	Clyde Rathbone
OC	13	Stirling Mortlock
IC	12	Matt Giteau
LW	11	Lote Tuqiri
FH	10	Stephen Larkham
SH	9	George Gregan (c)
N8	8	David Lyons
OF	7	Phil Waugh
BF	6	George Smith
RL	5	Nathan Sharpe
LL	4	Justin Harrison
TP	3	Al Baxter
HK	2	Jeremy Paul
LP	1	Bill Young
Replacements:
HK	16	Adam Freier
PR	17	Matt Dunning
LK	18	Dan Vickerman
N8	19	John Roe
SH	20	Chris Whitaker
FB	21	Matt Burke
WG	22	Wendell Sailor
Coach:
Eddie Jones

FB	15	Percy Montgomery
RW	14	Breyton Paulse
OC	13	Marius Joubert
IC	12	De Wet Barry
LW	11	Jean de Villiers
FH	10	Jaco van der Westhuyzen
SH	9	Fourie du Preez
N8	8	Jacques Cronjé
BF	7	AJ Venter
OF	6	Schalk Burger
RL	5	Gerrie Britz
LL	4	Bakkies Botha
TP	3	Eddie Andrews
HK	2	John Smit (c)
LP	1	Os du Randt
Replacements:
HK	16	Hanyani Shimange
PR	17	CJ van der Linde
LK	18	Albert van den Berg
N8	19	Joe van Niekerk
SH	20	Bolla Conradie
FH	21	Gaffie du Toit
WG	22	Brent Russell
Coach:
Jake White

=== Round 4 ===
7 August 2004
20:00 AEST (UTC+10)

Australia	23–18	New Zealand (1 BP)
Try: Tuqiri; Pen: Burke (2); Giteau (4)		Pen: Carter (4); Spencer; Mehrtens

Stadium Australia, Sydney
Attendance: 83,418
Referee: Jonathan Kaplan (South Africa)

FB	15	Chris Latham
RW	14	Clyde Rathbone
OC	13	Stirling Mortlock
IC	12	Matt Giteau
LW	11	Lote Tuqiri
FH	10	Stephen Larkham
SH	9	George Gregan (c)
N8	8	David Lyons
OF	7	Phil Waugh
BF	6	George Smith
RL	5	Nathan Sharpe
LL	4	Justin Harrison
TP	3	Al Baxter
HK	2	Brendan Cannon
LP	1	Bill Young
Replacements:
HK	16	Jeremy Paul
PR	17	Matt Dunning
LK	18	Dan Vickerman
N8	19	John Roe
SH	20	Chris Whitaker
FB	21	Matt Burke
WG	22	Wendell Sailor
Coach:
Eddie Jones

FB	15	Mils Muliaina
RW	14	Doug Howlett
OC	13	Tana Umaga (c)
IC	12	Dan Carter
LW	11	Joe Rokocoko
FH	10	Carlos Spencer
SH	9	Justin Marshall
N8	8	Xavier Rush
OF	7	Marty Holah
BF	6	Jono Gibbes
RL	5	Ali Williams
LL	4	Chris Jack
TP	3	Carl Hayman
HK	2	Keven Mealamu
LP	1	Kees Meeuws
Replacements:
HK	16	Andrew Hore
PR	17	Greg Somerville
FL	18	Mose Tuiali'i
FL	19	Craig Newby
SH	20	Byron Kelleher
FH	21	Andrew Mehrtens
CE	22	Sam Tuitupou
Coach:
(New Zealand) Graham Henry

=== Round 5 ===
14 August 2004
15:00 SAST (UTC+02)

(1 BP) South Africa	40–26	New Zealand
Try: Joubert (3); Paulse; De Villiers; Con: Montgomery (3); Pen: Montgomery (3)		Try: Muliaina; Rokocoko; Con: Mehrtens (2); Pen: Mehrtens (4)

Ellis Park Stadium, Johannesburg
Attendance: 62,857
Referee: Nigel Williams (Wales) (Note: Replaced by Donal Courtney (Ireland))

FB	15	Percy Montgomery
RW	14	Breyton Paulse
OC	13	Marius Joubert
IC	12	De Wet Barry
LW	11	Jean de Villiers
FH	10	Jaco van der Westhuyzen
SH	9	Bolla Conradie
N8	8	Joe van Niekerk
BF	7	Gerrie Britz
OF	6	Schalk Burger
RL	5	Victor Matfield
LL	4	Bakkies Botha
TP	3	Eddie Andrews
HK	2	John Smit (c)
LP	1	Os du Randt
Replacements:
HK	16	Hanyani Shimange
PR	17	CJ van der Linde
LK	18	AJ Venter
N8	19	Jacques Cronjé
SH	20	Fourie du Preez
FH	21	Gaffie du Toit
WG	22	Brent Russell
Coach:
Jake White

FB	15	Mils Muliaina
RW	14	Doug Howlett
OC	13	Tana Umaga (c)
IC	12	Sam Tuitupou
LW	11	Joe Rokocoko
FH	10	Andrew Mehrtens
SH	9	Justin Marshall
N8	8	Xavier Rush
OF	7	Marty Holah
BF	6	Jono Gibbes
RL	5	Simon Maling
LL	4	Chris Jack
TP	3	Carl Hayman
HK	2	Keven Mealamu
LP	1	Kees Meeuws
Replacements:
HK	16	Andrew Hore
PR	17	Greg Somerville
FL	18	Mose Tuiali'i
FL	19	Craig Newby
SH	20	Byron Kelleher
FH	21	Nick Evans
CE	22	Aaron Mauger
Coach:
(New Zealand) Graham Henry

=== Round 6 ===
21 August 2004
15:00 SAST (UTC+02)

South Africa	23–19	Australia (1 BP)
Try: Matfield; Van Niekerk; Con: Montgomery (2); Pen: Montgomery (3)		Try: Tuqiri; Mortlock; Smith; Con: Giteau (2)

Kings Park Stadium, Durban
Attendance: 52,247
Referee: Paddy O'Brien (New Zealand)

FB	15	Percy Montgomery
RW	14	Breyton Paulse
OC	13	Marius Joubert
IC	12	De Wet Barry
LW	11	Jean de Villiers
FH	10	Jaco van der Westhuyzen
SH	9	Bolla Conradie
N8	8	Joe van Niekerk
BF	7	AJ Venter
OF	6	Schalk Burger
RL	5	Victor Matfield
LL	4	Bakkies Botha
TP	3	Eddie Andrews
HK	2	John Smit (c)
LP	1	Os du Randt
Replacements:
HK	16	Hanyani Shimange
PR	17	CJ van der Linde
LK	18	Gerrie Britz
N8	19	Jacques Cronjé
SH	20	Fourie du Preez
FH	21	Gaffie du Toit
WG	22	Brent Russell
Coach:
Jake White

FB	15	Chris Latham
RW	14	Clyde Rathbone
OC	13	Stirling Mortlock
IC	12	Matt Giteau
LW	11	Lote Tuqiri
FH	10	Stephen Larkham
SH	9	George Gregan (c)
N8	8	David Lyons
OF	7	Phil Waugh
BF	6	George Smith
RL	5	Justin Harrison
LL	4	Nathan Sharpe
TP	3	Al Baxter
HK	2	Brendan Cannon
LP	1	Bill Young
Replacements:
HK	16	Jeremy Paul
PR	17	Matt Dunning
LK	18	Dan Vickerman
N8	19	John Roe
SH	20	Chris Whitaker
FB	21	Matt Burke
WG	22	Wendell Sailor
Coach:
Eddie Jones

== Scorers ==
Leading try scorers
Pos	Name	Tries	Pld	Team
1	Jean de Villiers	3	4	South Africa
1	Marius Joubert	3	4	South Africa
3	Lote Tuqiri	3	4	Australia

Leading point scorers
Pos	Name	Points	Pld	Team
1	Percy Montgomery	45	4	South Africa
2	Dan Carter	38	3	New Zealand
3	Matt Giteau	26	4	Australia
