= High School Old Boys RFC =

Rugby union football club based in Christchurch, New Zealand

(New Zealand) High School Old Boys RFC
- Union: Canterbury Rugby Football Union
- Nickname: Old Boys (unofficial)
- Founded: 1901
- Location: Christchurch, New Zealand
- Ground(s): Bob Deans Playing Fields, Hagley Park
- President: Macca McLennan
- Director of Rugby: Jamie "Livo" Livingstone
- Captain: Alex Newfield
Team kit

Official website
- www.oldboys.co.nz/%0A%20pattern_la1=_whiteshoulders

High School Old Boys is a rugby union football club based in Christchurch, New Zealand. The club was founded in 1901 by former students of Christchurch Boys' High School (CBHS). While many members are former CBHS students, High School Old Boys RFC is an open club accepting both male and female players. The club is affiliated with the Canterbury Rugby Football Union.

== Name ==
The official name of the club is the "Christchurch High School Old Boys Rugby Football Club". This is generally shortened to "High School Old Boys" (HSOB) and the club is commonly referred to simply as "Old Boys" or the "Polar Bears" due to their full white playing uniform and notoriously cold home fields.

== Location ==
The High School Old Boys clubrooms are located in Hagley Park adjacent to the Bob Deans Playing Fields on North Hagley Park, 12 Riccarton Avenue, Christchurch

== Colours ==
Old Boys colours are: White jersey, white shorts and black socks with blue tops

== All Blacks coaches from HSOB ==
- Graham Henry, former All Blacks coach
- Steve Hansen, current All Blacks coach
- Brad Mooar, former All Blacks assistant coach

== Notable players ==
=== All Blacks ===
A number of New Zealand representatives, called All Blacks, have been selected for international duties while affiliated to the club. Before the advent of professionalism in 1996, international players would appear for their clubs regularly in New Zealand, but since the introduction of Super Rugby, most professional players play for their clubs only rarely.

- Bob Deans
- Harry Taylor
- Cyril Evans
- Bill Dalley
- Jim Parker
- Jack Harris
- Sid Carleton
- Frank Clark
- George Mehrtens
- Jack Rankin
- Don Cobden
- Doug Wilson
- Pat Vincent
- John Graham
- John Morrissey
- Tony Steel
- Clive Currie
- Richard Loe
- Graeme Bachop
- Andrew Mehrtens
- Justin Marshall
- Daryl Gibson
- Reuben Thorne
- Nathan Mauger
- Aaron Mauger
- Daniel Carter
- Luke Romano
- Mitchell Drummond
- George Bridge

In 2022 HSOB Rugby also had their first Black Ferns (NZ Women's) player with World Cup winning Full Back Renee Holmes

=== Super Rugby ===
CRUSADERS

- Stephen Brett
- Daniel Carter
- George Bridge 2017
- Reed Prinsep
- Ben Funnell
- Mitchell Drummond
- Daniel Lienert-Brown

Hurricanes

- Reed Prinsep

Highlanders

- Daniel Lienert-Brown

Blues

- Sam Darry

=== Canterbury ===
- Craig Clarke

=== Japan ===
- Philip O'Reilly
