= Nathan Williams =

Nathan Williams may refer to:

- Nathan Williams (rugby union, born 1976), Australian rugby union player
- Nathan Williams (rugby union, born 1983), Welsh rugby union player
- Nathan Williams (politician) (1773–1835), United States Representative from New York
- Nathan Williams (Zydeco) (born 1964), American Zydeco accordionist and singer
- Nathan Williams (EastEnders), character from the British soap opera EastEnders
- Nathan Williams (musician) (born 1986), guitarist and founding member of surf rock band Wavves
- Nathan Hale Williams (born 1976), American film and television producer
- Nathan Williams, founder and editor-in-chief of magazine Kinfolk
