= Cyril Evans =

Cyril Evans may refer to:

- Cyril Edward Evans (1896–1975), New Zealand cricketer and rugby player
- Cyril Furmstone Evans (1892–1959), wireless telegraphist, associated with the RMS Titanic
