= Lloyd Ashby =

New Zealand rugby union player (1931–2025)

- Born: Desmond Lloyd Ashby; 15 February 1931 Mataura, New Zealand
- Died: 18 August 2025 (aged 94) Dunedin, New Zealand
- School: Southland Technical College
- Notable relative: Justin Marshall (nephew)
- Occupation: Orchardist

Rugby union career
- Position: Fullback
Provincial / State sides
Years	Team	Apps	(Points)
1951, 1955–59	Southland	59	(328)
International career
Years	Team	Apps	(Points)
1958	New Zealand	1	(0)

Desmond Lloyd Ashby (15 February 1931 – 18 August 2025) was a New Zealand rugby union player. A fullback, Ashby represented Southland at a provincial level, scoring what was at that time a record 328 points for the union. He played one match for the New Zealand national side, the All Blacks, a test against the touring Australian team in 1958. He later served as a selector for the Eastern Southland sub-union in 1961, and coached the Kaikorai club side in Dunedin in 1979. Ashby was a great uncle of former All Black halfback Justin Marshall.

Ashby died in Dunedin on 18 August 2025, at the age of 94.
