= Aaron Hopa =

- Born: 13 November 1971 Hamilton
- Died: 8 December 1998 (aged 27) Sea, off Coromandel Peninsula
- Height: 1.93 m (6 ft 4 in)
- Weight: 98 kg (216 lb)

Rugby union career
- Position: Loose forward
Senior career
Years	Team	Apps	(Points)
1995-1998	Waikato		
1997-1998	Chiefs		
International career
Years	Team	Apps	(Points)
1997	New Zealand	4	(5)

Aaron Remana Hopa (13 November 1971 – 8 December 1998) was a New Zealand international rugby union player whose career was cut short when he died in a diving accident at sea.

== Early life ==
Hopa was born in 1971 in Hamilton, Waikato, a province of New Zealand's north island.

== Career ==
He was an All Black in 1997 and played four matches on that year's tour of Britain and Ireland. He played for Waikato at provincial level including the Ranfurly Shield winning team in 1997 and he also played for the Chiefs in the Super 12. Hopa was outstanding in his position of loose forward.

== Death ==
In 1998, Hopa drowned in an accident while on a diving expedition near Slipper Island, off the Coromandel Peninsula coast of Waikato. He was 27.
