= Jean de Villiers =

South African rugby union player

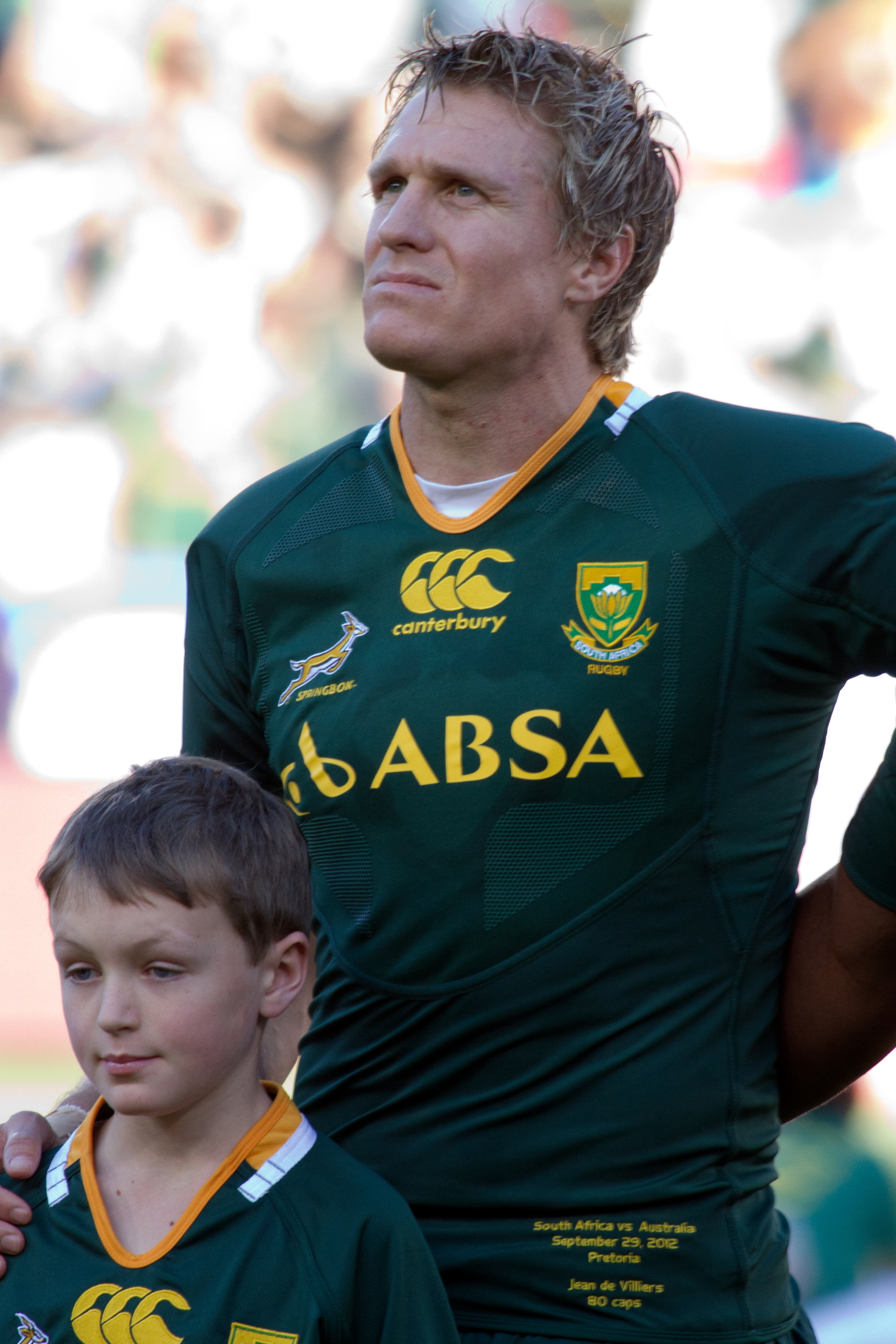
- De Villiers with South Africa in 2012
- Born: Jean de Villiers; 24 February 1981 (age 45) Paarl, South Africa
- Height: 1.90 m (6 ft 3 in)
- Weight: 103 kg (227 lb; 16 st 3 lb)
- School: Paarl Gimnasium
- University: Stellenbosch University
- Occupation: Professional rugby player

Rugby union career
- Position: Centre/wing
Youth career
- 2002: Western Province
Senior career
Years	Team	Apps	(Points)
2001–2009	Western Province	37	(125)
2005–2009	Stormers	53	(90)
2009–2010	Munster	23	(40)
2010–2015	Western Province	13	(25)
2011–2015	Stormers	52	(50)
2015–2016	Leicester Tigers	2	(5)
- Correct as of February 2017
International career
Years	Team	Apps	(Points)
1999	South Africa Schools		
2000	South Africa Under-19		
2001–2002	South Africa Under-21	9	(35)
2002	South Africa Sevens		
2002–2015	South Africa	109	(135)
2006	South Africa XV	1	(0)
2008 & 2013	Barbarians	2	(10)
2015	Springbok XV	1	(0)
- Correct as of 26 September 2015
Medal record
Men's rugby sevens
Representing South Africa
Commonwealth Games
Bronze medal – third place	2002 Manchester	Team competition

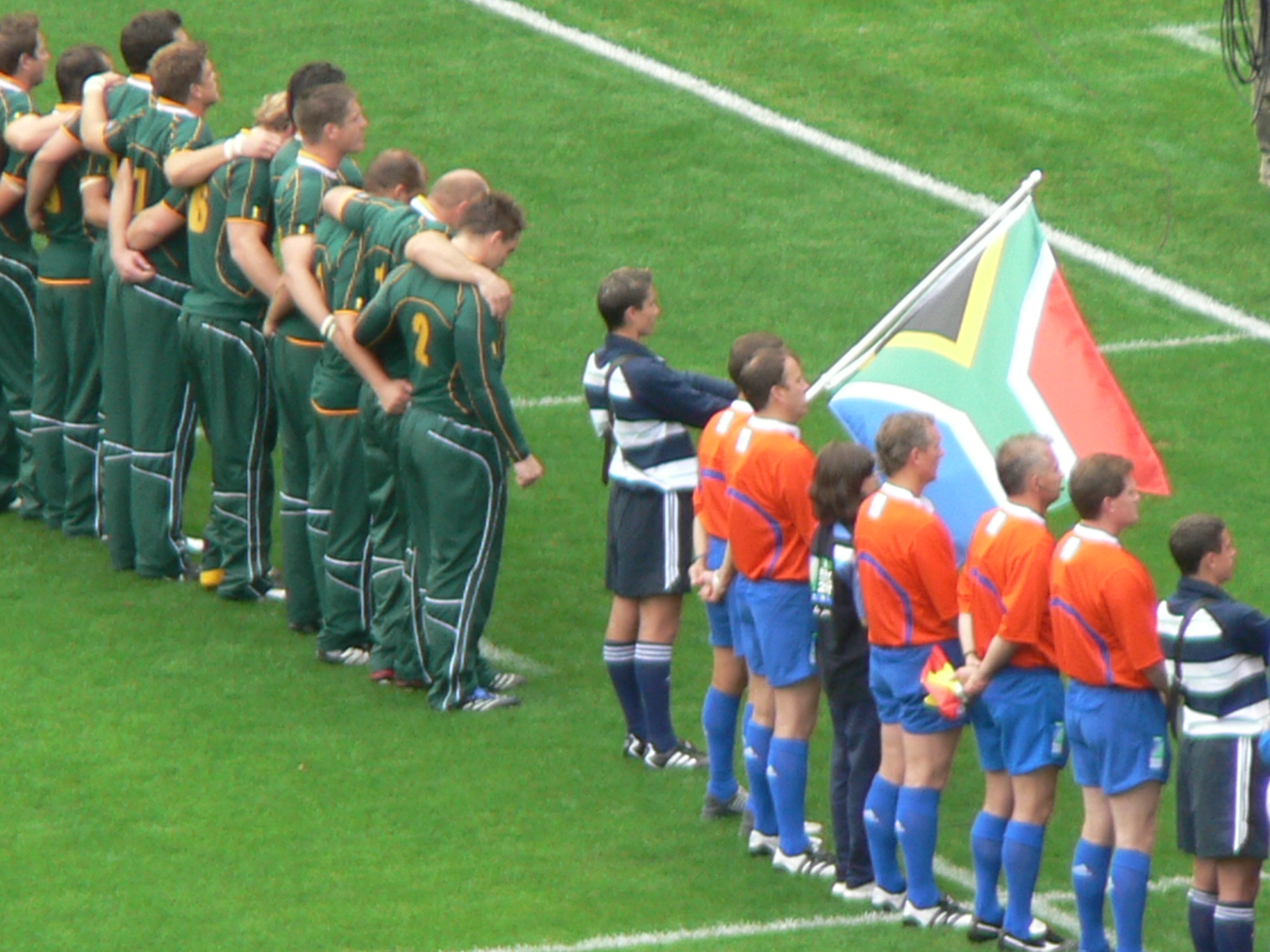
The Springboks before their game against New Zealand

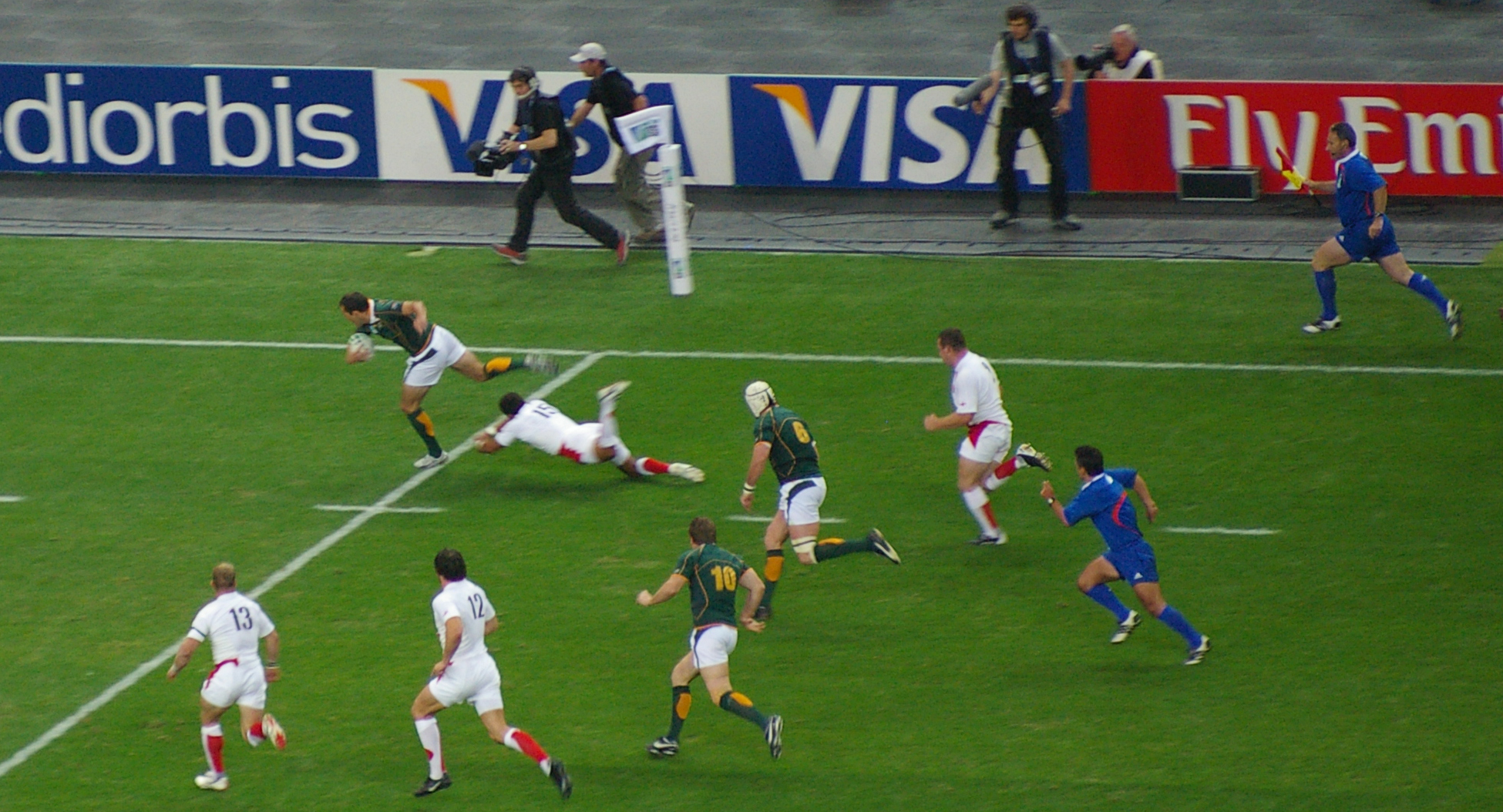
England playing South Africa in the 2007 World Cup.

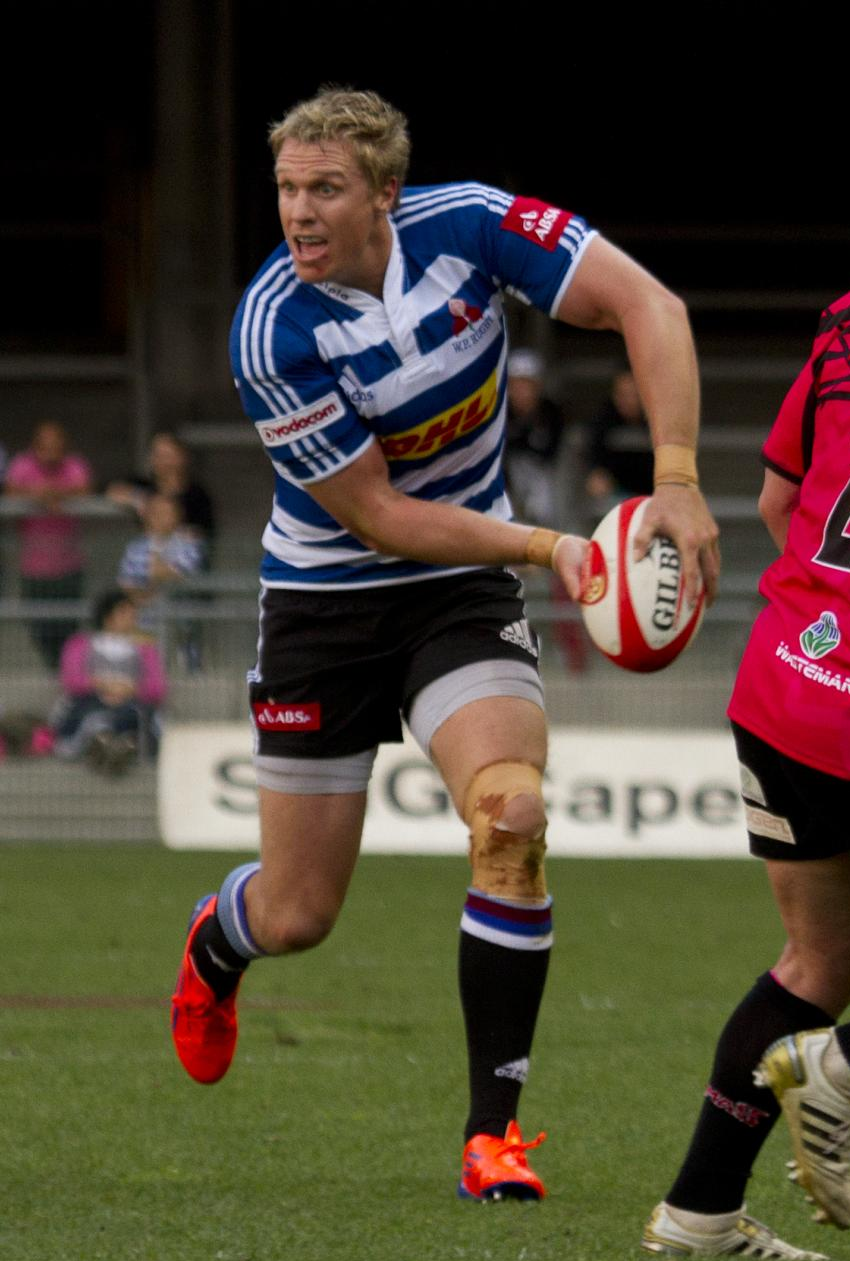
De Villiers playing for Western Province

Jean de Villiers (born 24 February 1981) is a South African former professional rugby union player. He started his career at wing, but played most of his career as an inside centre. De Villiers previously played for Western Province in the Currie Cup, the Stormers in Super Rugby, Leicester Tigers in Premiership Rugby and internationally for South Africa, for whom he was named captain in June 2012.

== Career ==
A product of Paarl Gimnasium, the nursery of many a future South African star player (among them past international teammate Marius Joubert and South African back-rower Schalk Burger), De Villiers made his first impact at international level in the South African Sevens team, playing in ten of the eleven legs of the 2001–02 World Sevens Series, helping his country finish in second spot. He was also a member of the squad that finished third in the 2002 Commonwealth Games. Also in 2002, he made his first international impact in the 15-man game at the U-21 Rugby World Cup, scoring four tries in the tournament for the victorious Junior Springboks.

He made his first senior-level appearance for South Africa in November 2002 against France, but suffered a major knee injury five minutes into the game. After regaining fitness, he became an important player in the Boks' 2004 renaissance, which saw them earn an unexpected victory in the Tri Nations Series that year. Both he and his former Paarl teammate Joubert earned a share of the try-scoring lead in the 2004 Tri Nations, with three apiece.

De Villers won the World Cup with South Africa in 2007, although he tore his biceps during the opening game of the tournament and took no further part. In 2009 De Villers won a second Tri Nations with South Africa. In November 2014 while playing against Wales in Cardiff, he suffered a potentially career ending injury that involved dislocating his left knee with tearing of major ligaments, reconstruction with artificial ligaments and rehabilitation allowed him back into the game. After recovering from the injury De Villers captained South Africa during the 2015 Rugby World Cup, but he fractured his jaw during the second match and was ruled out of the tournament.

=== Move to Munster ===
On 20 July 2009, it was announced that De Villiers will leave Western Province and join Munster from mid-September 2009 on a one-year contract, with an option to renew for another two years. De Villiers's first game for the province was against Newport-Gwent Dragons in the Magners League on Sunday 27 September at Musgrave Park, when he started alongside Lifeimi Mafi in the Munster midfield as a late call-up after Keith Earls was forced withdraw through illness, De Villiers having initially been named on the bench. Munster won 27–3. He scored his first try for Munster in a Heineken Cup tie with Treviso at Thomond Park in October. Munster won the match 41–10 with De Villiers scoring Munster's seventh and final try of the game. He scored his second try against Ulster in the Magners league and third against Perpignan in the Heineken cup.

He left Munster and returned to South Africa at the end of their season in 2010. In June 2010 he signed a contract to play for Western Province in the 2010 Currie Cup (although he missed most of the tournament due to international duties) as well as for the Stormers in the inaugural Super 15 competition in 2011.

=== 2009 Tri Nations ===
South Africa won the 2009 Tri-Nations. He started the first game at inside-centre in which South Africa beat New Zealand 28–19. De Villers then played all the other matches scoring one try against New Zealand in which the Boks won 32–29.

=== 2010 Tri Nations ===
Jean De Villiers started the Tri-Nations playing on the right wing in which New Zealand beat the Boks 32–12. The All Blacks then beat them 31–17 in which de Villiers continued his run as a right-winger. The Boks were then edged by the All Blacks 29–22 in which De Villiers started at inside-centre. South Africa then beat Australia 44-31 but lost 41-39 the next game which De Villiers scored his first try of the 2010 Tri-Nations.

Away from international rugby, De Villiers played in the 2010 Super Rugby final, losing with the Stormers (against the Bulls) as well as in the 2010 Currie Cup final, losing with Western Province against the Sharks.

=== 2012 mid-year test series ===
De Villiers was selected as captain of the Springboks as England toured South Africa in mid-2012. The coach Heyneke Meyer was delighted to announce him as captain after a series of good performances for his team in Super Rugby. On 9 June 2012 the first test was played in Durban; South Africa beat England 22–17 with De Villiers scoring a try in the 59th minute. The next Saturday he led South Africa against England in the second test in Johannesburg which the Boks won 36–27. The third and final test on 23 June 2012 in Port Elizabeth was drawn 14-14.

At the conclusion of the 2012 Rugby Championship, De Villiers joined up with Western Province for the later stages of the Currie Cup. De Villiers was injured in his first match back causing him to miss the semi-final and the final. De Villiers accompanied the team to the final against the Sharks on 27 October 2012 in Durban as the 23rd player. Western Province won the final and De Villiers did receive a winners tankard at the post match presentation.

=== Initial Retirement ===
De Villiers announced his retirement from test rugby on 27 September 2015 following a jaw fracture he sustained at the 2015 Rugby World Cup. In response, he exclaimed that "Injuries are part of rugby and I've had my fair share, so by now I know how to cope with them. It's very sad, but life goes on – I need to take it all in and move forward". South Africa head coach Heyneke Meyer paid tribute to De Villiers, saying: "Rugby will be poorer without him [De Villiers]" and adding that "He is a true ambassador for South Africa".

=== Leicester Tigers ===
On 27 October 2015, it was announced that De Villiers would join Leicester Tigers from December 2015. His first game was on 19 February 2016 against Harlequins in a 19–25 loss at The Stoop. He scored his first try in the following and De Villiers' final game against London Irish at Welford Road. In April 2016, De Villiers was announced as being set to leave Welford Road at the end of the 2015–16 season. No departure was confirmed at the end of the 2015–16 season, and De Villiers was not announced in the 2016–17 season squad.

== Post-retirement ==
As of July 2025, de Villiers is chairman of the Chris Burger fund, established by Morné du Plessis to raise funds for the financial support of seriously or catastrophically injured South African rugby players and to create education to reduce injuries in the sport.

== Statistics ==
- Test Debut: Versus France on 9 November 2002
- Total Tests: 109
- Springbok captain: 54th
- Springbok captain tests: 37
- Tries for South Africa: 27
- Tries for Stormers & Western Province: 58
- Total career tries: 94
- Most capped South African centre: 94 tests

=== Test Match record ===
Against	P	W	D	L	Tri	Pts	%Won
Argentina	9	7	1	1	1	5	83.33
Australia	24	14	0	10	6	30	58.33
British and Irish Lions	2	2	0	0	0	0	100
England	12	9	1	2	2	10	79.17
France	6	3	1	2	2	10	70
Ireland	5	2	0	3	0	0	40
Italy	5	5	0	0	1	5	100
Japan	1	0	0	1	0	0	0
Namibia	1	1	0	0	1	5	100
New Zealand	23	9	0	14	5	25	39.13
Pacific Islanders	1	1	0	0	1	5	100
Samoa	4	4	0	0	0	0	100
Scotland	6	5	0	1	0	0	83.33
Uruguay	1	1	0	0	2	10	100
Wales	9	8	0	1	6	30	88.89
Total	109	71	3	35	27	135	66.51

Pld = Games Played, W = Games Won, D = Games Drawn, L = Games Lost, Tri = Tries Scored, Pts = Points Scored

=== Test tries (27) ===
Tries	Opposition	Location	Venue	Competition	Date	Result
1	Pacific Islanders	Gosford, Australia	Central Coast Stadium	Test match	17 July 2004	Won 38–24
1	New Zealand	Christchurch, New Zealand	Lancaster Park	2004 Tri Nations Series	24 July 2004	Lost 21–23
1	Australia	Perth, Australia	Subiaco Oval	2004 Tri Nations Series	31 July 2004	Lost 26–30
1	New Zealand	Johannesburg, South Africa	Ellis Park	2004 Tri Nations Series	14 August 2004	Won 40–26
1	Wales	Cardiff, United Kingdom	Millennium Stadium	Test match	6 November 2004	Won 38–36
2	Uruguay	East London, South Africa	Basil Kenyon Stadium	Test Match	11 June 2005	Won 134–3
1	France	Durban, South Africa	Kings Park	Test match	18 June 2005	Draw 30–30
1	France	Port Elizabeth, South Africa	Boet Erasmus Stadium	Test match	25 June 2005	Won 27–13
1	Australia	Johannesburg, South Africa	Ellis Park	Mandela Challenge Plate	23 July 2005	Won 33–20
1	New Zealand	Cape Town, South Africa	Newlands	2005 Tri Nations Series	6 August 2005	Won 22–16
1	England	Bloemfontein, South Africa	Free State Stadium	Test match	26 May 2007	Won 58–10
1	Namibia	Cape Town, South Africa	Newlands	Test match	15 August 2007	Won 105–13
1	Wales	Bloemfontein, South Africa	Free State Stadium	Test Match	7 June 2008	Won 43–17
2	Wales	Pretoria, South Africa	Loftus Versfeld	Test Match	14 June 2008	Won 37–21
1	Wales	Cardiff, United Kingdom	Millennium Stadium	Test Match	8 November 2008	Won 20–15
1	New Zealand	Hamilton, New Zealand	Waikato Stadium	2009 Tri Nations Series	12 September 2009	Won 32–29
1	Australia	Bloemfontein, South Africa	Free State Stadium	2010 Tri Nations Series	4 September 2010	Lost 39–41
1	England	Durban, South Africa	Kings Park	Test match	9 June 2012	Won 22–17
1	Italy	Durban, South Africa	Kings Park	Test match	8 June 2013	Won 44–10
1	Argentina	Soweto, South Africa	FNB Stadium	2013 Rugby Championship	17 August 2013	Won 73-13
1	Australia	Brisbane, Australia	Suncorp Stadium	2013 Rugby Championship	7 September 2013	Won 38–12
1	New Zealand	Johannesburg, South Africa	Ellis Park	2013 Rugby Championship	5 October 2013	Lost 27–38
1	Wales	Cardiff, United Kingdom	Millennium Stadium	Test Match	9 November 2013	Won 24–15
2	Australia	Cape Town, South Africa	Newlands	2014 Rugby Championship	27 September 2014	Won 28–10

Rugby Union Captain
Preceded by Johann Muller	Springbok Captain; 2012–15	Next: Schalk Burger
