= Lourens Venter =

South African rugby union player

- Born: Sybrand Lourens Venter; 25 June 1976 (age 50) Kuruman, Cape Province
- Height: 1.81 m (5 ft 11 in)
- Weight: 82 kg (181 lb)
- School: Kalahari High School, Kuruman

Rugby union career
- Position(s): Centre, Wing
Provincial / State sides
Years	Team	Apps	(Points)
1996–2001	Griquas	54	(145)
2002	Leopards	2	(5)
Super Rugby
Years	Team	Apps	(Points)
1999	Cats	3	(5)
International career
Years	Team	Apps	(Points)
1998	South Africa (tour)	4	

Sybrand Lourens Venter (born 25 June 1976) is a South African former rugby union player.

== Playing career ==
Venter matriculated at Kalahari High School in Kuruman and represented Griquas at the 1994 Craven Week tournament. He made his senior provincial debut for Griquas in 1996.

Venter toured with the Springboks to Britain and Ireland in 1998 and played in four tour matches.

== See also ==
- List of South Africa national rugby union players – Springbok no. 672
