= Kelvin Middleton =

New Zealand rugby union player (born 1974)

- Full name: Kelvin Jon Middleton
- Born: 18 May 1974 (age 52)

Rugby union career
- Position: Loose forward
Provincial / State sides
Years	Team	Apps	(Points)
1996–03	Otago	75	(75)
Super Rugby
Years	Team	Apps	(Points)
1998–03	Highlanders	58	(25)

Kelvin Jon Middleton (born 18 May 1974) is a New Zealand former professional rugby union player.

== Rugby career ==
Hailing from Queenstown, Middleton was an Otago provincial captain, capped 58 times for the Highlanders between 1998 and 2003. He played on the Highlanders team that contested the 1999 Super 12 final, which they lost to the Crusaders.

Middleton toured Europe with New Zealand "A" in 2000.

Before retiring, Middleton had a stint in Japanese professional rugby, at Fukuoka-based club Coca-Cola West Japan.

== Personal life ==
Middleton married the daughter of ex-Highlanders coach Gordon Hunter.
