= Nathan Williams (rugby union, born 1983) =

Welsh rugby union player

- Born: Nathan Williams; 5 October 1983 (age 43) Haverfordwest, Wales
- Height: 183 cm (6 ft 0 in)
- Weight: 117 kg (18 st 6 lb)

Rugby union career
- Position: Prop
Senior career
Years	Team	Apps	(Points)
2011–2014	NG Dragons	46	(5)
- Correct as of 11:31, 29 October 2011 (UTC)

Nathan Williams (born 5 October 1983) is a Welsh former rugby union player, who was a Wales Under-21 international. He played for Llanelli, Carmarthen Quins, Narberth, Milford Haven, Newport, Cross Keys, Bedwas, Moseley, and the Llanelli Scarlets and Newport Gwent Dragons regional teams.
