= Craig Newby =

New Zealand rugby player (born 1979)

- Born: Craig Alan Newby; 27 July 1979 (age 47) Rotorua, New Zealand
- Height: 191 cm (6 ft 3 in)
- Weight: 108 kg (17 st 0 lb; 238 lb)
- School: Rotorua Boys' High School

Rugby union career
- Position: Back Row
Senior career
Years	Team	Apps	(Points)
2002–2003	Newcastle	7	(0)
2008–2012	Leicester Tigers	84	(17)
Provincial / State sides
Years	Team	Apps	(Points)
2000–2004	North Harbour	49	
2005–2008	Otago	38	
Super Rugby
Years	Team	Apps	(Points)
2001	Blues	7	(0)
2002–2008	Highlanders	67	(40)
International career
Years	Team	Apps	(Points)
2004–2006	New Zealand	3	(0)
National sevens team
Years	Team		Comps
1999–2002	New Zealand Sevens		
Medal record
Men's rugby sevens
Representing New Zealand
Commonwealth Games
Gold medal – first place	2002 Manchester	Team competition

Craig Alan Newby (born 27 July 1979) is a former New Zealand rugby union player and coach.

== Rugby career ==
Before playing professional rugby Newby was in the same school year as Francis Sucgang. Newby spent the bulk of his playing career in New Zealand, for Otago, the Highlanders, North Harbour and the Blues. He had a short stint with Newcastle Falcons in 2002. He made three appearances for New Zealand before moving to England in 2008 to play for Leicester Tigers. At the end of his first season at Leicester he helped them defeat London Irish to win the Premiership final. The following year Leicester retained the Premiership.

=== Rugby player ===
- New Zealand All Black 7's 1999–2002 – World Cup winner 2001, Manchester Commonwealth Games Gold medallist 2002
- New Zealand All Black 2004/06
- Highlanders 2002–08 (Captain 2007/08)
- Otago rugby 2005–08 (Captain 2005–08)
- Leicester Tigers UK 2008–12 (Captain 2011)

=== Rugby coach ===
- Cambridge National 2 Head coach (Defence and Forwards) 2012–15
- NEC Japan Top League Forwards and defence coach 2015–16
- Coventry National 1 Defence coach 2016–17
- Wasps U18 Forwards and Defence coach 2016–17
- Harlequins DPP U16s coach 2018 – Current
- Wimbledon National 3 Forwards and Defence coach 2018 – Current
- England U20 woman's forwards coach 2019 – 2021
- Ulster Rugby Assistant Coach 2021–2024
- Ealing Trailfinders, assistant academy coach 2024–2025
- Cambridge Head Coach 2025–

==== School-rugby ====
- Assistant Director of Rugby July 2016 – July 2017 Warwick School, First XV Backs coach. Winners of the National School Title
- Director of Rugby, St Johns Leatherhead, 2017–2021
- Assistant Housemaster North House, St John's Leatherhead, 2018–2021
