= Deon Muir =

New Zealand rugby union player (born 1973)

- Full name: Deon David Muir
- Born: 13 May 1973 (age 53) Rotorua, New Zealand
- Height: 6 ft 2 in (188 cm)
- Weight: 233 lb (106 kg)

Rugby union career
- Position: No. 8
Provincial / State sides
Years	Team	Apps	(Points)
1995–02	Waikato	101	(210)
Super Rugby
Years	Team	Apps	(Points)
1996	Crusaders	4	(0)
1997–02	Chiefs	33	(25)

Deon David Muir (born 13 May 1973) is a New Zealand former professional rugby union player.

== Biography ==
Muir was born in Rotorua and educated at St Stephen's School outside Auckland.

=== Rugby career ===
A number eight, Muir led the Chiefs during the 2001 and 2002 Super 12 seasons, earning New Zealand rugby's "Super 12 Player of the Year" award for his captaincy efforts in his first year in charge. He spent his entire provincial career with Waikato and was captain for part of their 21 successive Ranfurly Shield defences. In 2002, Muir became the 20th Waikato player to reach 100 games in their NPC semi-final win over Otago, then left at the season's end to play rugby with Japanese club Sanix. He played seven years with the Fukuoka-based club before retiring in 2008.
