= Jono Gibbes =

NZ international rugby union player

- Born: Jonathan Brian Gibbes; 22 January 1977 (age 49) Henderson, New Zealand
- Height: 1.94 m (6 ft 4 1/2 in)
- Weight: 112 kg (17 st 9 lb)

Rugby union career
- Position(s): Loose forward, Lock
Provincial / State sides
Years	Team	Apps	(Points)
2000–2007	Waikato	64	((?))
- Correct as of 26 July 2007
Super Rugby
Years	Team	Apps	(Points)
2001–2008	Chiefs	68	(33)
- Correct as of 17 May 2008
International career
Years	Team	Apps	(Points)
2002–2006	Māori All Blacks	9	(0)
2004–2005	New Zealand	8	(0)
- Correct as of 2 July 2005
Coaching career
- Years: Team
- 2008–2014: Leinster (Forwards coach)
- 2014–2017: Clermont Auvergne (Forwards coach)
- 2017–2018: Ulster
- 2018: Waikato
- 2018–2021: La Rochelle (Director of Rugby)
- 2021–2023: Clermont Auvergne
- 2023–2025: New Zealand U20
- 2025–: Chiefs
- Correct as of 21 July 2025

Jonathan Brian Gibbes (born 22 January 1977) is a rugby union former player and coach. He is a former New Zealand rugby union player who captained Waikato, the Chiefs and the Māori All Blacks, and appeared in various All Blacks teams. He is the former forwards coach of Leinster in Ireland and Clermont Auvergne in France while also serving as head coach of Ulster in Ireland, and was the director of rugby at La Rochelle. He is currently the head coach of the Chiefs in Super Rugby.

== Rugby playing career ==
Gibbes traditionally played at the position of Blindside Flanker, or No.6, but has also played at Lock. Due to his height of 194 cm, he was overlooked by the All Black selectors for being too short for an international class lock.

Weighing 109 kg, Gibbes's career was plagued by injury. Nonetheless, his line-out jumping skills were impressive, and under the guidance of John Mitchell was selected as captain of the Waikato NPC team in 2003. Despite various appearances for the All Blacks, Gibbes highest career achievement was captaining the NZ Maori to their first ever victory over the British & Irish Lions 19–13. During the match, which was played at Waikato and Chiefs home ground of Waikato Stadium, Gibbes was on the ground suffering from cramp but staggered to his feet to make a try-saving tackle.

On 13 June 2006, it was announced that Gibbes would be joining the Ospreys in Wales. On 6 September 2006 however, the NZRU and Waikato announced that he has signed a new three-year contract with them. The 2007 season saw Gibbes remain in New Zealand and continue with the Chiefs, with injury again affecting his availability.

== Rugby coaching career ==
In July 2008 it was announced that Gibbes had been appointed as forwards coach of Leinster in Ireland.

In February 2017 it was announced that Gibbes had been appointed as head coach of Ulster in Ireland, on a two-year contract from the 2017/18 season.

In March 2018 he announced he was leaving Ulster to return to New Zealand for family reasons after only one season. A few days later it was revealed he would take over as coach at Waikato, a move he described as a product of his need to find employment following his decision to move home.

However, in June 2018, less than three months after his departure from Ulster to return to New Zealand was made public it was revealed he would become head coach of La Rochelle in France.

Rory Best has subsequently written of his disappointment at the manner of Gibbes’ exit from Ulster.

In 2025, after being selected as an assistant coach for Chiefs in Super Rugby, he was promoted as Head Coach for the 2026 season after current Chief's coach, Clayton McMillan was signed up by Munster Rugby.
