= Michael Collins (rugby union, born 1974) =

New Zealand rugby player (born 1974)

- Born: Michael Collins; 10 May 1974 (age 52) New Plymouth, New Zealand
- Height: 1.78 m (5 ft 10 in)
- Weight: 112 kg (17 st 9 lb)
- University: Waikato University

Rugby union career
- Position: Prop
Senior career
| Years | Team | Apps | (Points) |
| 2005-07 | London Irish | | |
| 2007-08 | Glasgow Warriors | 5 | (0) |
Provincial / State sides
| Years | Team | Apps | (Points) |
| - | Waikato | 73 | |
Super Rugby
| Years | Team | Apps | (Points) |
| 1997-2005 | Chiefs | 81 | |
International career
| Years | Team | Apps | (Points) |
| – | New Zealand U19 | | |
| – | New Zealand U21 | | |
| – | New Zealand 'A' | | |
| – | New Zealand Barbarians | | |
Coaching career
- Years: Team
- 2008-12: Taranaki (Rugby Development Manager)
- Taranaki (Scrum coach)
- 2013-: Taranaki (Chief Executive)

Michael Collins (born 10 May 1974) is a former New Zealand 'A' international rugby union player. He played for Glasgow Warriors, London Irish and Chiefs.

== Rugby Union career ==
=== Amateur career ===
Former captain of New Plymouth Boys' High School first XV.

=== Professional career ===
He had 73 games for the provincial side Waikato.

He began his professional career playing for the New Zealand provincial Super Rugby team Chiefs. He captained the side in 1999.

He signed for Glasgow Warriors in 2007, after a two year with London Irish.

=== International career ===
Collins has played for New Zealand U19, New Zealand U21, New Zealand 'A' and New Zealand Barbarians.

=== Coaching career ===
In September 2008 Collins joined Taranaki as a rugby development manager, leaving Glasgow Warriors. He later became the club's scrum coach.

=== Administration career ===
In 2013 was made Chief Executive of Taranaki Rugbry.
