= George Mehrtens =

NZ international rugby union player

- Born: George Martin Mehrtens; 5 February 1907 Rangiora, New Zealand
- Died: 30 August 1954 (aged 47) Rangiora, New Zealand
- Height: 1.72 m (5 ft 8 in)
- School: Christchurch Boys' High School
- Notable relative: Andrew Mehrtens (grandson)
- Occupation: Carpenter

Rugby union career
- Position: Fullback
Provincial / State sides
Years	Team	Apps	(Points)
1928	Canterbury	4	
International career
Years	Team	Apps	(Points)
1928	New Zealand	0	(0)

George Martin Mehrtens (5 February 1907 – 30 August 1954) was a New Zealand rugby union player. A fullback, Mehrtens represented Canterbury at a provincial level, and was a member of the New Zealand national side, the All Blacks, in 1928. He played three matches for the All Blacks but did not play any full internationals.
