= Roger Randle =

New Zealand international rugby union player

- Born: Roger Quentin Randle; 15 May 1974 (age 52) Hastings, New Zealand
- Height: 190 cm (6 ft 3 in)
- Weight: 100 kg (15 st 10 lb; 220 lb)

Rugby union career
- Position: Wing
Senior career
Years	Team	Apps	(Points)
2004–2005	Bourgoin		
2007–2008	Crociati		
Provincial / State sides
Years	Team	Apps	(Points)
1994–1997	Hawkes Bay	27	(135)
'98-'04, '06	Waikato	63	(250)
Super Rugby
Years	Team	Apps	(Points)
1996–1997	Hurricanes	5	(0)
1998–2004	Chiefs	59	(190)
International career
Years	Team	Apps	(Points)
2001–2002	New Zealand	2	(0)
1995–2003	NZ Maori	8	(25)
National sevens team
Years	Team		Comps
1995–2002	New Zealand 7s		
Medal record
Men's rugby sevens
Representing New Zealand
Commonwealth Games
Gold medal – first place	1998 Kuala Lumpur	Team competition
Gold medal – first place	2002 Manchester	Team competition

Roger Quentin Randle (15 May 1974) is a New Zealand former rugby union player. He played as a wing for the All Blacks. He is currently assistant coach for Chiefs and Maori All Blacks.

== Career ==
Randle played for the Wellington Hurricanes (1996–1997), Waikato Chiefs (1998–2003 and 2005–2006) in the Super 14 competition and for CS Bourgoin-Jallieu (France, 2004–2005). He was top try scorer in the 2002 super 12 season with 13 tries and in 2002 NPC season with 12 tries. He represented the New Zealand Colts in 1995 and he also represented the New Zealand Māori rugby union team in 1996, 1998, 1999, 2000, 2001, 2002, 2003. He won two Commonwealth gold medals with New Zealand 7's in 1998 Kuala Lumpur and 2002 in Manchester. He made his debut for the All Blacks in November 2001 against Ireland A.

== Personal life ==
Randle is a New Zealander of Māori descent (Ngāti Awa descent).

Randle is married to Kelly Randle (née Wallbank). In 2006, their 16-month-old son, Luka, died by drowning at their home in Lyon, France. The couple have two daughters.

Rape Allegation

In 1997, while touring South Africa with the Hurricanes, Randle was charged with rape following an allegation made by a 31-year-old woman Charlene Donaldson, in Durban. The complainant later withdrew the charge, and no trial proceeded.

According to the Mail & Guardian, the woman said she had been drinking with Randle and other Hurricanes players. After complaining of a headache, she was given 2 tablets and then lost consciousness. She believed Randle may have spiked her with a drug, but medical tests revealed that she was clean of any drugs and had only drank a lot. The newspaper reported that DNA evidence linked Randle and 2 other Hurricanes players to sperm samples obtained during the investigation. The police investigator said the complainant's injuries to her legs, torso, and vagina were consistent with rape.

Randle denied the allegation at the time and again in 2026, upholding his innocence. In August 1997, New Zealand's Broadcasting Standards Authority upheld a complaint that a TVNZ 60 Minutes programme on the rape allegations was unfair, finding that the programme sought to vindicate Randle by portraying the complainant as of "dubious morality" and implying that, if raped, she had "asked for it". This was portrayed by an ex-boyfriend as stated in the report by the BSA. No order was imposed.

In April 2026, Munster Rugby confirmed that Randle would no longer take up a planned role as attack coach after his appointment caused concern among Munster supporters over the 1997 allegation; Munster and Randle said they had mutually agreed not to proceed. The board of Munster Rugby later established an independent review into the recruitment process that led to Randle's proposed appointment, as well as the province's wider governance structures.

== Statistics ==
Randle is the second highest tryscorer in Chiefs history with (38),

- most tries in a Ranfurly Shield season 14,
- most tries in a Waikato season 16,
- second most tries in a Hawkes Bay season 17.
- Hawkes Bay (1994–1997)
- Wellington Hurricanes (1996–1997)
- Waikato (1998–2004, 2006)
- Waikato Chiefs( 1998–2004)
- New Zealand U21 (1995)
- New Zealand 7's (1995–2002)
- New Zealand Maori (1995–2003)
- New Zealand All Blacks (2001–2002)
