= Christian Warner =

- Born: 22 January 1976 (age 50) Sydney, Australia
- School: Cranbrook School

Rugby union career
- Position: Fly-half
Senior career
Years	Team	Apps	(Points)
1996-2001	NSW Waratahs		
Provincial / State sides
Years	Team	Apps	(Points)
2002-2008	Leinster	94	
International career
Years	Team	Apps	(Points)
1997-2001	Australia A	6	

Christian P. Warner (born 22 January 1976) is an Australian former professional rugby union player who played as a fly-half and inside back. Born in Sydney, Warner enjoyed a diverse thirteen-year career across both hemispheres, playing for the NSW Waratahs in Super Rugby before moving to Europe to represent Pau in France, Leinster in Ireland, and Rugby Roma in Italy.At the international development level, he represented Australia at Under-19, Under-21, and Australia A levels.

Early life and career

Warner was raised in Sydney, Australia. He attended Waverley College and Cranbrook School, where he emerged as a highly touted schoolboy talent. He played his senior club rugby for Randwick DRUFC, a premier club in the Shute Shield. In 1995, Warner was nominated for the Norwich Rising Star award and given a prestigious three-year Australian Institute of Sport (AIS) rugby union scholarship, which solidified his placement in national developmental pathways.

Club career

NSW Waratahs (1996–2001) Warner joined the NSW Waratahs in 1996 and made his senior debut during the 1997 Super 12 season against the Hurricanes. He spent five seasons with the state franchise under coaches including Matt Williams. During his tenure, Warner competed in 33 Super 12 matches and scored 43 points.

Pau (2001–2002) In 2001, Warner signed with French club Section Paloise (Pau) to play in the Top 16 domestic competition. His single season in France proved challenging as the club faced relegation pressure.

Leinster (2002–2008) In July 2002, Warner was signed by Irish provincial side Leinster Rugby. He was recruited by his former Waratahs coach, Matt Williams, who sought experienced fly-half cover following injuries to Nathan Spooner and Emmet Farrell.Warner quickly became a versatile and dependable playmaker for the Irish province, establishing himself as a reliable goal-kicker and fan favourite. He stayed with Leinster for six seasons, making 94 appearances across the Celtic League and the European Rugby Champions Cup. During his first season, he notably helped steer the club to a European Cup semi-final.

Rugby Roma (2008–2009) Warner concluded his professional playing career in Italy, spending the 2008–2009 season with Rugby Roma Olimpic in the Italian competition.

International career

National team near-misses (1996) The year 1996 served as a major crossroad in Warner's early international prospects. At 20 years old, he narrowly missed out on selection for the senior Wallabies squad ahead of their undefeated 12-game tour of Europe under head coach Greg Smith. Smith ultimately prioritized senior fly-half Tim Wallace and an emerging Stephen Larkham for the inside back roles.In the same calendar year, Warner was selected to represent the Australian National Men's Sevens team. However, he was forced to withdraw from the squad after sustaining an injury, which temporarily stalled his senior international momentum.

Australia A (1997) Warner bounced back through the national ranks the following season. In 1997, he was selected for Australia A and put in a memorable, standout performance against the touring French national team. He earned a total of 6 caps for Australia A between 1997 and 2001.

Coaching career

After retiring from playing, Warner returned to Sydney and transitioned into sports management and elite coaching. He has served as a specialist rugby coach for several prominent Athletic Association of the Great Public Schools (AAGPS) and Combined Association of Schools (CAS) institutions, including Cranbrook School and Knox Grammar School.
