= Steve Lancaster =

New Zealand rugby union player (born 1971)

- Full name: Stephen Gregory Lancaster
- Born: 4 February 1971 (age 55)

Rugby union career
- Position: Lock
Provincial / State sides
Years	Team	Apps	(Points)
1993	Auckland	1	(0)
1996–00	Canterbury	44	(25)
Super Rugby
Years	Team	Apps	(Points)
1997–00	Crusaders	26	(5)

Stephen Gregory Lancaster (born 4 February 1971) is a New Zealand former professional rugby union player and manager.

== Playing career ==
A native of Auckland and having been educated at St Peters College where he played senior inter-school Rugby Union, Lancaster was a NZ Colts representative lock in 1992 and briefly competed for his home province the following year, before moving down to Canterbury. He was a Crusaders player from 1997 to 2000 and came off the bench in their 1999 Super 12 grand final win over the Highlanders.

== Administration ==
Lancaster was the Crusaders high performance manager between 2006 and 2012, then worked in a similar role with Rugby Canada for two years. He was Head of High Performance at Netball New Zealand in 2015 and 2016, before taking up a position with New Zealand Rugby, where he was most recently GM of Community Rugby.
