= Afato So'oalo =

Samoan rugby union player

- Born: 5 January 1974 (age 52) Apia, Samoa
- Height: 5 ft 9 in (1.75 m)
- Weight: 193 lb (88 kg)

Rugby union career
- Position: Wing
Senior career
Years	Team	Apps	(Points)
1994-1997	Marist St. Joseph		
1997	Linwood		
Provincial / State sides
Years	Team	Apps	(Points)
1997–2001	Canterbury	27	(100)
Super Rugby
Years	Team	Apps	(Points)
1997–2001	Canterbury Crusaders	26	(85)
International career
Years	Team	Apps	(Points)
1996–2001	Samoa	20	(75)

Afato So'oalo (born 5 January 1974, in Apia) is a former Samoan rugby union player. He played for the Manu Samoa team and also played for the Crusaders and for Aviron Bayonnais in France. He played as a winger.

== Career ==
A devastating runner, So'oalo debuted for Samoa during a match against Ireland, at Lansdowne Road, on 12 November 1996, where he scored one of the most memorable tries in recent history when completing a 70-yard move with his first touch. He was part of the 1999 Rugby World Cup roster, playing two matches, where he scored a try against Japan. His last international cap was also against Ireland, at Lansdowne Road, on 11 November 2001.

He was a regular member of the Crusaders from 1997 to 2001 and played on the right wing. So’oalo excelled in the No.14 jersey, and in a memorable moment in the 1999 Super Rugby final scored a match winning try against the Highlanders, by out sprinting Jeff Wilson to score in the corner, and win the game for the Crusaders.
