= Nathan Williams (rugby union, born 1976) =

Australian rugby union player (born 1976)

- Born: 5 April 1976 (age 50)
- Height: 185 cm (6 ft 1 in)
- Weight: 90 kg (198 lb)

Rugby union career
- Position: Fullback / Wing
Senior career
Years	Team	Apps	(Points)
2001–02	Stade Français		
2002–03	Harlequins		
2004–07	Yamaha Jubilo		
Super Rugby
Years	Team	Apps	(Points)
1998–04	Reds	36	(32)

Nathan Williams (born 5 April 1976) is an Australian former professional rugby union player.

== Rugby career ==
An Australia u-21s representative, Williams was primarily a fullback and winger, who played several seasons with the Queensland Reds in the Super 12. He scored two tries in a win over the NSW Waratahs in 2000 and was the top try scorer for the Reds in the 2001 season. From 2001 to 2003, Williams had overseas stints with Stade Français and Harlequins, then made a brief return at the Reds in 2004, before joining Japanese professional rugby.

== Personal life ==
Williams is the ex-husband of television presenter Tania Zaetta.
