= Rhys Duggan =

New Zealand rugby union player

- Born: Rhys John Llewellyn Duggan; 31 July 1972 (age 54) Rotorua, New Zealand
- Height: 1.75 m (5 ft 9 in)
- Weight: 75 kg (165 lb)
- School: Wesley College

Rugby union career
- Position: Halfback
Provincial / State sides
Years	Team	Apps	(Points)
1993	Bay of Plenty		
1994–2004	Waikato	111	(103)
Super Rugby
Years	Team	Apps	(Points)
1996	Hurricanes	7	(10)
1998	Highlanders		
1997–2005	Chiefs		
International career
Years	Team	Apps	(Points)
1999	New Zealand	1	(0)
1996–2002	New Zealand Māori		
1998–99	New Zealand 'A'		

Rhys John Llewellyn Duggan (born 31 July 1972) is a former New Zealand rugby union player. A halfback, Duggan represented Bay of Plenty and Waikato at a provincial level and the Hurricanes, Highlanders and Chiefs in Super Rugby. He played one match for the New Zealand national side, the All Blacks, a test against Italy in the 1999 Rugby World Cup. Of Ngāti Manawa descent, Duggan played for New Zealand Māori between 1996 and 2002.
