= Cyril Edward Evans =

New Zealand cricketer

- Born: 10 January 1896 Christchurch, New Zealand
- Died: 13 May 1975 (aged 79) Christchurch, New Zealand

Rugby union career
- Position: Fullback
International career
Years	Team	Apps	(Points)
1921	New Zealand	1	(0)

Cyril Edward Evans (10 January 1896 – 13 May 1975) was a New Zealand rugby union player and cricketer. He played 13 first-class matches for Canterbury in the Plunket Shield in the 1920s. He also played one match for the All Blacks in 1921.
