= Matthew Dowling =

Australian rugby union player (born 1974)

- Born: 13 September 1974 (age 52)

Rugby union career
- Position: Winger
Super Rugby
Years	Team	Apps	(Points)
1998–01	Waratahs	30	(89)
Medal record
Men's rugby sevens
Commonwealth Games
Bronze medal – third place	1998 Kuala Lumpur	Team competition

Matthew Dowling (born 13 September 1974) is an Australian former professional rugby union player.

A speedy Gordon winger, Dowling was signed by the NSW Waratahs in 1997 after topping the try-scoring for that season's AAMI Cup. He competed with the Waratahs from 1998 to 2001, making 30 appearances in the Super 12 competition. In a match against the touring Ireland national team in 1999, Dowling scored four tries in the space of 27 minutes during the second half, in a 39-24 Waratahs win. He finished his career with a season at Italian club Gran Parma.
