= Daryl Gibson =

NZ international rugby union player

- Born: Daryl Peter Earl Gibson; 2 March 1975 (age 51) Lumsden, New Zealand
- School: Christchurch Boys' High School
- University: University of Canterbury; Christchurch College of Education
- Notable relative: Justin Marshall (cousin)
- Occupation: Professional rugby union coach

Rugby union career
- Position: Centre
Amateur team(s)
Years	Team	Apps	(Points)
- ChCh HSOB
- Correct as of 7 May 2007
Senior career
Years	Team	Apps	(Points)
2002–03	Bristol	21	(25)
2003–07	Leicester	90	(75)
2007–08	Glasgow	18	
Provincial / State sides
Years	Team	Apps	(Points)
	Canterbury	80	
Super Rugby
Years	Team	Apps	(Points)
1996–2002	Crusaders	77	(75)
International career
Years	Team	Apps	(Points)
1996–2001	New Zealand Māori	12	
1999–2002	New Zealand	19	(5)
Coaching career
- Years: Team
- 2007-2008: Glasgow Warriors (Backs Coach)
- 2008-2012: Crusaders (Assistant)
- 2010-2012: Māori All Blacks (Assistant)
- 2013-2015: NSW Waratahs (Assistant)
- 2016–2019: NSW Waratahs
- 2016: Samoa (Technical Advisor)
- 2020-: Fiji (Assistant)

Daryl Peter Earl Gibson (born 2 March 1975) is the Chief High Performance Officer for New Zealand Cricket (NZC). He was previously an international rugby coach and former New Zealand rugby union footballer. He played for the Crusaders in the Super Rugby and represented his country with the All Blacks. After success as assistant coach with the Waratahs side when they won the 2014 Super Rugby Championship, Gibson replaced Michael Cheika as head Coach of the team in 2015.

== Early life ==
Gibson was born in Lumsden, New Zealand and grew up in Te Anau, before shifting to Christchurch where he attended Christchurch Boys High School.

== Playing career ==
Gibson played for Canterbury and The Crusaders from 1993 to 2002 where he made a combined 168 appearances for the team that went on to win four Super Rugby crowns during that time. The internationally renowned centre also earned 19 caps for the New Zealand All Blacks. Between 1996 and 2001, Gibson represented New Zealand Māori 12 times.

Moving to the northern hemisphere Gibson played for Bristol Bears (21 caps), Leicester Tigers (92 caps) and Glasgow Warriors (18 caps) before moving into coaching.

== Coaching career ==
Gibson started his coaching career as a player and part-time backs coach with Glasgow Warriors, while in Glasgow, Gibson welcomed the arrival of his triplets Indy, Oscar and Finley.

=== Crusaders ===
In 2008 he returned home to his former Club the Canterbury Crusaders, this time as the Assistant Coach from 2008 to 2012. During Gibson's time the Crusaders progressed through to the semi-final on four occasions and finished runners up in 2011, after an incredible year where the team played no home games because crusaders are only Christchurch crusaders of the Christchurch earthquakes.

Gibson was also the Assistant Coach to the national Maori All Blacks side during 2010–2012. Alongside Head Coach Jamie Joseph. In 2010, the centenary eries of 100 years of Maori rugby, the team had successful games against visiting teams Ireland and England.

=== NSW Waratahs ===
Moving to Sydney in 2013, Gibson joined the NSW Waratahs. His first 2 seasons were transition years as the team roster welcomed a host of young players as established players departed overseas. In 2018, Gibson lead the Waratahs to the semi finals vs the Lions. In 2019 a promising start to the season was overshadowed by events surrounding star player Israel Folau.

== Education ==
Gibson is a qualified Physical Education teacher, has degrees in Commerce and Education. Gibson is currently completing his second master's degree at Sydney University with a thesis entitled: "Coach Approach through losing streaks". It examines how the elite coaches in Australian Football League (AFL), National Rugby League (NRL) and Rugby Union, lead their teams through challenging situations of losing.

His education qualifications include: Masters of Education with Distinction (MEd Dist) (University of Canterbury), Bachelor of Commerce (B.Com.) (University of Canterbury), Bachelor of Education (BEd Phys Ed) (University of Canterbury), Diploma of Teaching (Dip. TCH) (Christchurch College of Education)

== Family ==
Gibson has four children. Poppy, Indy, Oscar and Finley Gibson

== See also ==
- High School Old Boys RFC

Awards
Preceded by Norm Maxwell	Tom French Memorial; Māori rugby union player of the year 2000	Succeeded by Caleb Ralph
