= Andrew Mehrtens =

NZ rugby union player (born 1973)

Andrew Mehrtens MNZM
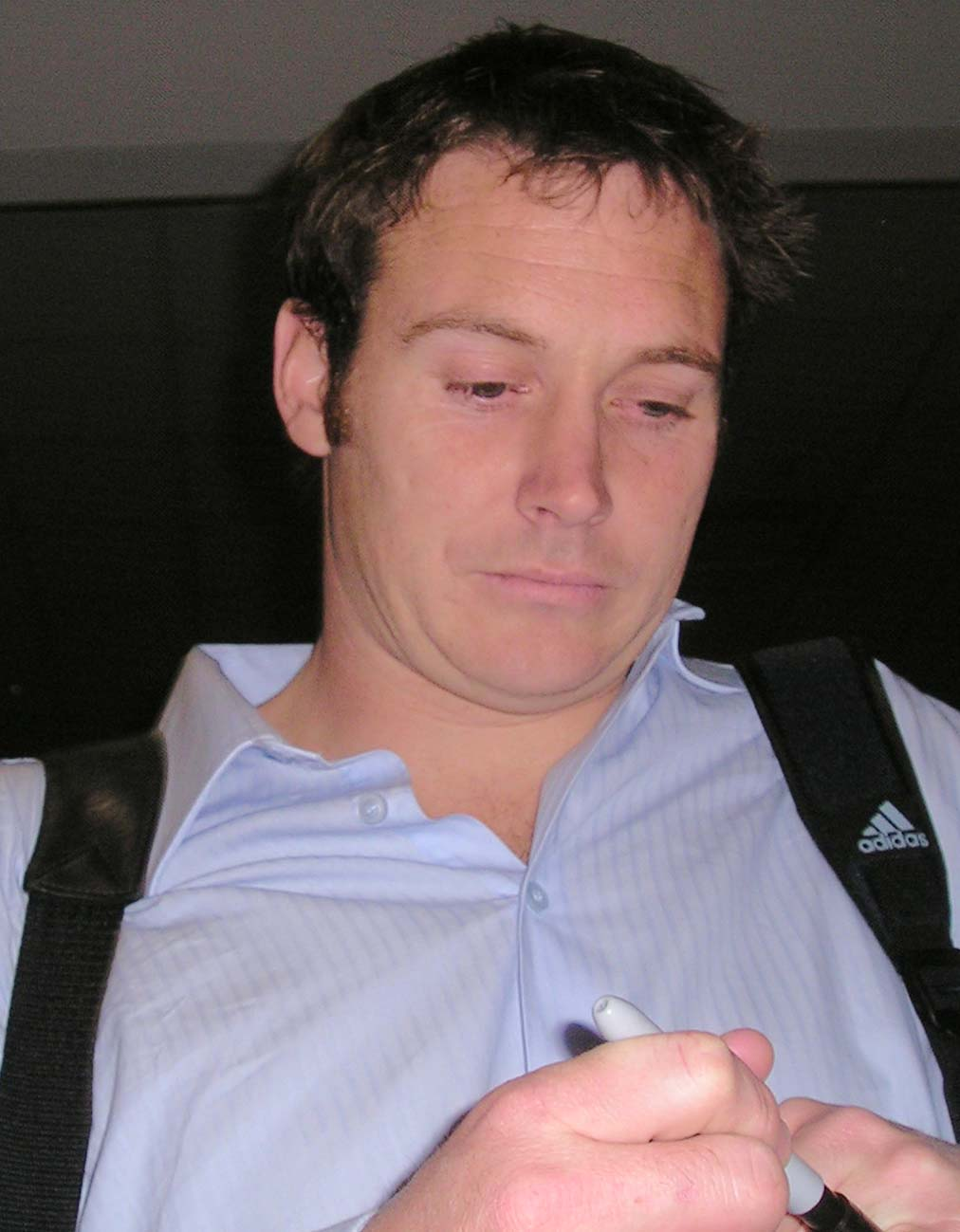
- Born: Andrew Philip Mehrtens; 28 April 1973 (age 53) Durban, South Africa
- Height: 1.78 m (5 ft 10 in)
- Weight: 89 kg (14 st 0 lb; 196 lb)
- School: Christchurch Boys' High School
- Notable relatives: George Mehrtens (grandfather); Reuben Thorne (brother-in-law)

Rugby union career
- Position: First five-eighth
Amateur team(s)
Years	Team	Apps	(Points)
- Christchurch HSOB
Senior career
Years	Team	Apps	(Points)
2010–2013	Béziers	19	(97)
2008–2010	Racing Métro 92	29	(288)
2007–2008	Toulon	25	(261)
2005–2007	Harlequins	32	(318)
Provincial / State sides
Years	Team	Apps	(Points)
1993–2005	Canterbury	108	(1056)
Super Rugby
Years	Team	Apps	(Points)
1996–2005	Crusaders	87	(990)
International career
Years	Team	Apps	(Points)
1995–2004	New Zealand	70	(967)

Andrew Philip Mehrtens MNZM (born 28 April 1973) is a New Zealand former rugby union player. He was regarded as a top first five-eighth, having played first for Canterbury in 1993, before being selected for the All Blacks (New Zealand's national team) in 1995 when he played in the 1995 World Cup.

After his move to England, and later to France, he helped his first three clubs to promotion into their country's top flight. He first joined Harlequins in England, where in his first season he played a major factor in leading the freshly relegated club to an immediate return to the top-level Guinness Premiership. After seeing Harlequins successfully through their first season back in the Premiership, he went to the ambitious Pro D2 club Toulon for the 2007–08 season. After Toulon won the title to secure an immediate return to the Top 14, he remained in Pro D2, moving to another ambitious side, Racing Métro. For the second straight season, his team won the Pro D2 crown and a spot in the Top 14.

== Youth ==
Mehrtens was born in Durban, South Africa, as his parents lived in South Africa for four years from 1970 and returned to New Zealand when he was still a young child. Mehrtens grew up in Christchurch, attended Christchurch Boys' High School where he played in the 1st XV, and played Junior Grade Rugby for Kaiapoi. He recalled, when he was aged 10, his Kaiapoi team playing a match at Lancaster Park as a curtain raiser to the Ranfurly Shield match between Canterbury and Mid Canterbury. He also represented New Zealand at under-19 and under-21 levels.

Like many players in New Zealand, Mehrtens comes from a family with a long involvement in rugby. His grandfather, George Mehrtens, played for Canterbury in the 1920s as a fullback and was an All Black in unofficial internationals against New South Wales in 1928. His father, Terry, also a first five, represented Canterbury between 1964 and 1976. He was a New Zealand under-23 player in 1965 against the Springboks and again in 1967, and while in South Africa played as a fullback for Natal against the 1970 All Blacks.

== Career ==
New Zealand rugby has had few players who have won such wide popularity and affection as Andrew Mehrtens, who in a 12-year career at first class level became a national figure rather than simply an icon of his Canterbury province. However, there was never total agreement on his ranking in the pecking order of All Black first five-eighths. Some headed by Colin Meads believed that Mehrtens was the best in his position ever produced by New Zealand. Others believed that despite his immense skills, vision, kicking and ability to throw long cut out passes to his outsides he had limitations, especially in the way rugby developed in the professional era. He was seen as lacking the physique or inclination to mix it physically, either taking the ball up or committing himself to the tackle.

Despite his family background Mehrtens only emerged as a rare prospect in his late teens, perhaps because he was a slower developer physically. In his teens Mehrtens showed almost as much promise in tennis, where in various age groups he was nationally ranked.

His first significant rugby selection was in 1992 when he played in the national under 19s against Australia in a side which also included later Crusaders or All Blacks teammates Adrian Cashmore, Norman Berryman, Milton Going, Tabai Matson, Justin Marshall and Taine Randell.

He was first chosen for Canterbury in 1993–94 and in each of those seasons he was in the New Zealand Colts, making his first major impact nationally in the Canterbury side which in 1994 took the Ranfurly Shield from Waikato. His performance that day and in Shield defences later that season against Counties and Otago marked him as a clear All Black prospect.

Though left out of the initial training squads, Mehrtens developed so much that he forced his way into the 1995 World Cup squad, having made his All Black debut in the early season test against Canada when he scored 28 points.

In the World Cup tournament he was a success, one of three youngsters with Jonah Lomu and Josh Kronfeld who gave the All Blacks a dimension which had been lacking for much of the 1994 season. The only quibble about Mehrtens at the World Cup was missing a dropped goal attempt in the extra time of the final.

Over the next six or seven seasons Mehrtens was a virtual automatic selection for the All Black squad, though he was not always assured of a starting position. A knee injury curtailed his 1995 tour of France and in the next few seasons injury and competition from the likes of Carlos Spencer and Tony Brown saw him miss a number of tests.

But he reasserted himself during the 1999 season, both in kicking a record nine penalties in a trans-Tasman test against Australia at Eden Park and then at the World Cup. However, an injury in the quarter-final against Scotland clearly affected him in the latter rounds.

Besides his importance to the All Blacks, Mehrtens from the late 1990s to the mid-2000s fashioned an outstanding record for the Crusaders at Super 12 level. He had key roles in their three title wins in 1998–2000, either through his tactical command of games or, as in the 2000 final against the Brumbies, with a penalty goal under severe pressure. He also played in the Crusaders sides which won the Super 12 titles of 2002 and 2005, even though in the final season he was now playing second fiddle to his protege Dan Carter.

Mehrtens was also a huge contributor to Canterbury at National Provincial Championship (NPC) levels, with his inside back partnership with half-back Justin Marshall becoming celebrated. As well as 1994 against Waikato he played in Shield winning sides in 2000 (against Waikato again) and in 2004 against Bay of Plenty. He played in three NPC winning sides in 1997, 2001 and 2004.

Over the latter stages, especially in 2003, Mehrtens was beset by personal problems which in turn affected his fitness and form. He battled to make the Crusaders then and in 2004 and was left out of the All Blacks for the 2003 season, though many believed he should have been recalled for the World Cup.

He eventually did win his All Black place back for a brief period in 2004, but by then it had become clear that the immediate future belonged to Carter. At the end of the 2005 Super 12, Mehrtens left New Zealand rugby to play for the Harlequins in Britain.

He left behind a formidable record: 281 first class games for 3,178 points, 108 games for Canterbury for 1,056 points, 87 for the Crusaders and 981 points, 72 games for the All Blacks and 967 points in 70 tests. His test aggregate, a record for a New Zealander until Carter surpassed it in November 2009, would have been greater, and well into four figures, had he not missed many of the "softer" tests played during his time in the All Blacks. His understudies – Simon Culhane, Spencer and Brown – all scored heavily in his absence from these matches.

=== International ===
Mehrtens debuted for the All Blacks in 1995 and made an immediate impact, scoring 28 points against Canada in his Test debut; at that time, that was the highest point total ever by a player making his international debut. He also featured in the team that played in the 1995 Rugby World Cup final against South Africa and came within inches of claiming victory for New Zealand, with a drop goal attempt veering just wide of the posts at the end of regulation time.

Mehrtens is currently the second all-time points scorer for the All Blacks, with 967 points (7t, 169c, 188p, 10dg), having been overtaken by Dan Carter on 21 November 2009. He has scored 20 or more points in 13 separate Tests, has scored nine penalties in two separate Tests, and is currently the only player to have scored over 300 points in the Tri Nations Series. His 209 points against South Africa is the most ever by one player against one country; he also occupies third place on that list, with 202 against Australia. (Carter is currently second with 207 points against Australia.) Mehrtens is also atop the all-time list for Test conversions, with 167. A supposed drop in form, combined with injuries, saw him miss out on the All Blacks World Cup squad in 2003. Critics of coach John Mitchell felt New Zealand's chances were dealt a blow without the choice of an experienced goal-kicker, an area in which New Zealand could not compete in the semi-final against Australia. Nonetheless, a strong 2004 Super 12 campaign saw him called back to the All Blacks. He was also not included in the 2005 All Black squad to face the British and Irish Lions.

=== Domestic ===
In Super 12, Mehrtens was a key member of the dominant Crusaders side that won the competition four times in five years (1998, 1999, 2000, 2002), and in 2005, another successful year for the Crusaders, he also played well, making regular appearances off the bench and starting in a few games. During 2005 he became the competition's leading all-time scorer, a crown he held until 9 May 2009, when the Brumbies' Stirling Mortlock passed his record of 990 points. He was also on three NPC-winning Canterbury sides, in 1997, 2001 and 2004.

Mehrtens is credited with reestablishing the Canterbury region as a force in New Zealand rugby again after nine years in the wilderness when in 1994 he generaled a young team who won the Ranfurly Shield off Waikato. Since that time Canterbury and under his stewardship won numerous NPC championships listed above together with rewinning the Ranfurly Shield in 2000. He won his way into the team having displaced Greg Coffey in the Canterbury A team.

=== Post All Blacks ===
Mehrtens played his final match for Harlequins on the final day of the 2006–07 season which fell on his birthday, scoring 24 points in a victory over the Sale Sharks, after which supporters and teammates celebrated his birthday and bid farewell to him after the game ended.

On 23 May 2007, Mehrtens joined French Pro D2 team Toulon, who went on to win the league title that season and gain promotion to the Top 14.

For the 2008–2009 season, Mehrtens signed to play with French Pro D2 team Racing Métro 92.

After two years in Paris, which included the 2009 Pro D2 championship and a Top 14 playoff appearance in 2010 (which also secured Racing a place in the 2010–11 Heineken Cup), his contract was not renewed. He moved to the Fédérale 1 (third-division) side Béziers, signing a three-year deal with the club. Under his contract, Mehrtens has the option to move into the club's coaching staff once he decides to end his playing career.

In 2014 he joined the Waratahs as a kicking coach.

Mehrtens now lives in Sydney, and works as a commentator on Stan Sport, alongside Justin Harrison, and Morgan Turinui.

In 2026 a creditor applied to New Zealand's High Court for Mehrtens to be adjudged as bankrupt.

== Honours ==
In the 2006 New Year Honours, Mehrtens was appointed a Member of the New Zealand Order of Merit, for services to rugby.
