= Justin Marshall =

NZ international rugby union player

Justin Marshall MNZM
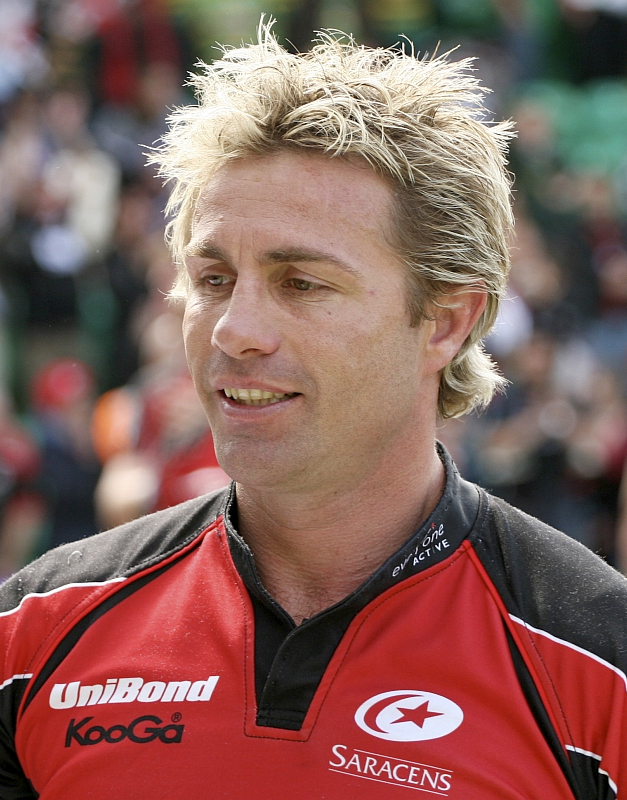
- Born: Justin Marshall; 5 August 1973 (age 53) Gore, New Zealand
- Height: 1.79 m (5 ft 10 in)
- Weight: 95 kg (14 st 13 lb; 209 lb)
- School: Gore High School
- Notable relative(s): Jack Taylor (uncle); Lloyd Ashby (uncle); Daryl Gibson (cousin)

Rugby union career
- Position: Halfback
Amateur team(s)
Years	Team	Apps	(Points)
- Christchurch HSOB
Senior career
Years	Team	Apps	(Points)
2005–2006	Leeds Tykes	25	(21)
2006–2008	Ospreys	27	(40)
2008–2009	Montpellier	28	(23)
2009–2010	Saracens	32	(11)
Provincial / State sides
Years	Team	Apps	(Points)
1992–1994	Southland	15	(21)
1995–2004	Canterbury	60	(196)
Super Rugby
Years	Team	Apps	(Points)
1996–2005	Crusaders	105	(118)
International career
Years	Team	Apps	(Points)
1995–2005	New Zealand	81	(140)

Justin Warren Marshall MNZM (born 5 August 1973) is a New Zealand former rugby union player. He played 81 games for the New Zealand All Blacks between 1995 and 2005.

Marshall played for the Crusaders in the Super 12 from 1996 to 2005, winning the competition five times. He subsequently moved to Europe and had spells playing for Leeds Tykes, the Ospreys, Montpellier and Saracens.

He is now a Sky Sports commentator in New Zealand for most All Blacks games and other provincial matches.

== Early life ==
He was born in Gore on 5 August 1973 and educated at Gore High School, before settling in Christchurch where he played for the High School Old Boys club.

== Playing career ==
Marshall began his rugby union career with Southland and was then asked to join Christchurch by Canterbury coach Vance Stewart. It was whilst here that Marshall first made the break into the All Blacks side for the 1995 tour of Italy and France. Marshall was just 22 when he made his début against France in a 37–12 win.

In 1997 Marshall was made captain of New Zealand and led out his team in four tests in Great Britain and Ireland, becoming the All Blacks' 54th test captain. In moving to Europe, Marshall retired from international rugby with the All Blacks in 2005. He made 81 appearances for the All Blacks, with a record of 61 wins, 1 draw and just 19 defeats. Marshall is the second, behind Aaron Smith, highest capped scrum half in All Blacks history. He has scored a record 24 test tries for New Zealand, 3 more than the next best for an All Blacks scrum half, held by Aaron Smith.

Marshall played for Canterbury in the National Provincial Championship, the Crusaders in the Super 12 competition.

His New Zealand contract ran out after the 2005 Lions tour, and he signed to play the 2005–06 season for Leeds Tykes in the English Premiership. Following the relegation of Leeds from the Premiership, Marshall left the club at the end of the season. On 25 April 2006 it was announced he had signed for the Welsh regional side Ospreys on a two-year contract beginning in September 2006. Before signing for Ospreys, Marshall indicated an interest in returning to New Zealand to once again be an All Black and play in the World Cup, even being prepared to play for Auckland. On 16 July 2008 Ospreys announced that Marshall had been released from his contract early, and he signed for Top 14 side Montpellier. On 15 January 2009 he signed for Saracens on a contract to the end of the 2008–09 season.

Throughout the 2009–10 season, whilst continuing to play for Saracens, Marshall was a pundit and commentator on BBC Wales rugby programme Scrum V. At the end of that season, he announced the end of his playing career with a view to moving back to New Zealand to focus on his broadcasting career there.

In April 2013, Marshall made an unexpected comeback, taking the field for club side Wakatipu, at the age of 39.

== Commentating career ==
Marshall joined Sky TV New Zealand in 2010.

== First-class record ==
- Southland under-18 (1991)
- New Zealand under-19 (1992)
- Southland Stags (1992–1994)
- New Zealand Divisional XV (1993)
- New Zealand Development Team (1994)
- New Zealand Colts (1993–1994)
- Canterbury RFU (1995–2004)
- NZRFU President's XV (1996)
- Harlequins (1996)
- Canterbury Crusaders (1996–2005)
- New Zealand Barbarians (1996)
- New Zealand A (1998)
- New Zealand Trials (1996, 1997, 1998, 2004)
- New Zealand All Blacks (1995–2005)
- Barbarians (2004–)
- Leeds Tykes (2005–2006)
- French Barbarians (2005)
- World XV (2006)
- Ospreys (2006–2008)
- Classic All Blacks (2007–2008,2015)
- Montpellier Hérault (2008–2009)
- Saracens (2009–2010)

== Awards and achievements ==
=== Individual ===
In the 2005 Queen's Birthday Honours, Marshall was appointed a Member of the New Zealand Order of Merit, for services to rugby.

- 1996 New Zealand National Provincial Championship Division I Player of the Year
- 2005 Crusaders Player of the Year
- Crusaders Hall of Fame (Class of 2023)

=== Team ===
Club and domestic

- 1994 New Zealand National Provincial Championship Division II Champions
- 1994–1995 Ranfurly Shield holders
- 1997 New Zealand National Provincial Championship Division I Champions
- 1998 Super 12 champions
- 1999 Super 12 champions
- 2000 Super 12 champions
- 2000–2003 Ranfurly Shield holders
- 2001 New Zealand National Provincial Championship Division I Champions
- 2002 Super 12 champions
- 2004 Ranfurly Shield holders
- 2004 New Zealand National Provincial Championship Division I Champions
- 2005 Super 12 champions
- 2006–07 Celtic League champions
- 2007–08 EDF Energy (Anglo-Welsh) Cup champions

International

- 1996 Bledisloe Cup champions
- 1996 Tri Nations champions
- 1996 New Zealand tour of South Africa series winner
- 1997 Bledisloe Cup champions
- 1997 Tri-Nations champions
- 1999 Tri-Nations champions
- 1999 Rugby World Cup fourth place
- 2002 Tri-Nations champions
- 2003 Bledisloe Cup champions
- 2003 Tri-Nations champions
- 2003 Rugby World Cup third place (bronze)
- 2004 Bledisloe Cup champions
- 2005 British & Irish Lions tour of New Zealand series winner

== See also ==
- High School Old Boys RFC

== Bibliography ==
- Gillies, Angus, Justin Marshall, (New Zealand, 2005)
