= Chiefs (Super Rugby) =

New Zealand rugby union club

- Union: New Zealand Rugby Union
- Founded: 1996
- Location: Hamilton, New Zealand
- Region: Bay of Plenty; Counties Manukau; East Coast; King Country; Thames Valley; Waikato; Taranaki
- Ground: FMG Stadium Waikato (Capacity: 25,000)
- Coach: Jono Gibbes
- Captain: TBA
- Most caps: Liam Messam (182)
- Top scorer: Damian McKenzie (1247)
- Most tries: Damian McKenzie (43)
- League: Super Rugby Pacific
- 2026: 2nd overall Playoffs: Runners-up
Team kit	2nd kit

Official website
- www.chiefs.co.nz

The Chiefs (Māori: Rangatira; formerly known as the Waikato Chiefs and officially called the Gallagher Chiefs for sponsorship reasons) are a New Zealand professional rugby union team based in Hamilton, Waikato. The team competes in the Super Rugby Pacific competition, previously known as the Super 12 and Super 14, and are one of the competition's five New Zealand teams. Their primary home ground is FMG Stadium Waikato.

The Chiefs region represents seven provincial unions: Bay of Plenty, Counties Manukau, Taranaki and Waikato, who compete in the National Provincial Championship (NPC), and King Country, Ngati Porou East Coast and Thames Valley, who compete in the Heartland Championship.

The Chiefs field three main teams: Chiefs (men's), who compete in Super Rugby Pacific, Chiefs Manawa (women's), who compete in Sky Super Rugby Aupiki and a men's under-20s team.

The Chiefs teams play in red, black and yellow colours with jerseys in recent years having strong Māori cultural elements to tie the club to its region. Māori culture, values and traditions are also a cornerstone of the club's culture, implemented during Dave Rennie's time as head coach and continued by current head coach Clayton McMillan.

Until 2004, the Chiefs were the only New Zealand side never to have qualified for the Super 12 semi-finals. In that year the Chiefs earned their first semi-final berth, and in the end achieved fourth place (defeated 37–20 in the semi-final by the ACT Brumbies). They subsequently reached the 2009 final, but found themselves on the short end of a record 61–17 defeat by the Bulls.

The Chiefs were rewarded with a home final after a strong 2012 season. The Chiefs defeated the Sharks 37–6, winning their first title. In 2013, the Chiefs became the fourth team to record back-to-back title wins, when they defeated the Brumbies 27–22 at Waikato Stadium.

In 2021 the Chiefs Rugby Club established their women's team, formerly known as the Chiefs women, now the Chiefs Manawa. The Chiefs Manawa won the inaugural season of Sky Super Rugby Aupiki in 2022 and were runner-up in the competition in 2023 and 2024.

In the history of Super Rugby, they were on the losing end of the three most lopsided finals in history, losing by 44 points to the Bulls in 2009, 31 points to the Blues in 2024 and 55 points to the Hurricanes in 2026.

== History ==
The Chiefs were founded in 1996 as the Waikato Chiefs for the inaugural Super 12 season in 1996. Prior to the Super 12, the Super 10 competition had been in place, which NPC teams took part in, including Waikato. In the first year of competition the Chiefs placed 6th in the overall standings, missing out on making the finals; winning 6 of their 11 regular season matches. The following season the Chiefs placed 11th, winning 4 games and losing 7. In 1998 the Chiefs performed closer to the standard of their 1996 season and placed at 7th in the final standings. In 1999 the side were able to do one better and claimed 6th position on the ladder but were still yet to make the playoffs.

In 2000 the Chiefs won 3 of their regular season games and finished the regular season in 10th place. The following season the team equalled their best position again – finishing 6th. In 2002 the team won 4 games and lost 7 to finish in 8th position, and the season after, 2003 Super 12 season, fell to a 10th-place finish. But the season after, the Chiefs won 7 regular season games and came 4th on the ladder – claiming the first semi-final spot in their history. The Chiefs lost the semi-final against the Brumbies. In 2005 the team finished 6th. In 2006, the Super 12 expanded to the Super 14, with the addition of a new Australian and South African club. The Chiefs won 7 of their 13 games and drew once with 5 losses to come 7th. In 2009, the Chiefs made their second ever semi-final, defeating the Hurricanes 14 – 10 to advance to the final for the first time. They lost the final to the Bulls by the biggest-ever margin of 61–17. In the 2010 and 2011 seasons, they were unable to replicate their form of 2009, missing the playoffs in both seasons.

In 2012, following the disappointing results of previous years, the Chiefs underwent a significant change in personnel. This included the recruitment of new coaches, including Dave Rennie and Wayne Smith, and players, including Aaron Cruden, Ben Tameifuna, Brodie Retallick and Sonny Bill Williams. The changes had an immediate impact as the Chiefs finished at the top of the New Zealand conference, qualifying for a home semi-final, which they won, defeating the Crusaders 20–17. They subsequently hosted the final for the first time in the teams's history, comprehensively defeating the Sharks by 37 – 6, claiming their first title. They also set many club records in the 2012 season, including: most home wins, best home streak, best season winning streak, and most points and tries scored.

In 2013, the Chiefs again won the Super Rugby title and the New Zealand conference with a regular-season record of 12 wins and four losses. They also won the BNZ Cup, a new trophy established by the NZRU for the New Zealand side with the best record in intra-conference matches.

In 2016 the Chiefs played a touring Wales side, winning the one-off encounter 40–7. In doing so they became the first New Zealand Super Rugby franchise to defeat an international team.

In 2017 the Chiefs played the British and Irish Lions side in Hamilton, losing the encounter 34–6. In the regular season, they finished 3rd in the NZ conference and 6th overall, putting them through to the playoffs. They won a thriller quarter final against the Stormers in Cape Town (17–11) but lost in the semi-finals to the Crusaders (27–13)

In 2018 the Chiefs finished 3rd in the NZ conference and 5th overall. This result put them through to the quarter-finals, in which they lost a tight battle against the Hurricanes (32–31)

The Chiefs didn't have a great start to the 2019 season, losing 4 games straight off the bat, including a loss to the Sunwolves (30–15). However, the Chiefs redeemed themselves by defeating the Bulls 56–20 and going on to win more. They ended up finishing 3rd in the NZ conference and 7th overall, which put them through to the quarter-finals. However, the Chiefs would lose to the Jaguares 21–16 in Buenos Aires

After 7 rounds in 2020, the Chiefs were 3rd in the NZ conference and 5th overall. However, the COVID-19 pandemic suspended the 2020 Super Rugby season from going ahead, for travel and health reasons. Despite this, NZRU created a domestic Super Rugby tournament called Super Rugby Aotearoa, which started in June 2020. The Chiefs played well but didn't win a single game in Super Rugby Aotearoa 2020.

The Chiefs lost their first 2 games of Super Rugby Aotearoa in 2021, and then got their first win in the competition against the Hurricanes (35–29). In the 2023 season, the Chiefs won 13 of the 14 regular season matches, going on to host the Crusaders at FMG Stadium Waikato for their first home final since 2013. The Crusaders however remained the Super Rugby Pacific champions winning 25–20.

== Franchise area and ownership ==
=== Franchise area ===
Since 1999, the Chiefs have represented the provincial unions of Bay of Plenty, Counties Manukau, King Country, Thames Valley and Waikato.

From 1996 to 1998 the Chiefs also represented North Harbour and Northland, with Counties Manukau and Thames Valley falling under the Auckland Blues catchment. Had the Blues been allowed to represent the Auckland, North Harbour, Counties Manukau and Northland unions, they would have been able to field almost a full national team due to player contracting rules at the time. In an effort by the NZRU to make things more fair, the Chiefs were given North Harbour and Northland, while the Blues were given Counties Manukau and Thames Valley. By 1999, clear regional dominance of national team players no longer existed, so North Harbour and Northland were 'returned' to the Blues in exchange for Counties Manukau and Thames Valley.

Taranaki was originally part of the Hurricanes from 1996, but switched to the Chiefs in 2013.

East Coast was also originally part of the Hurricanes from 1996, but as of February 2025 announced they had switched to the Chiefs.

=== Ownership ===
The Chiefs are a wholly owned subsidiary of the NZRU. However, in an effort to bring more capital into the sport, the NZRU established a system of privatised operation in 2013. In 2014, it was announced that a new entity, 'Chiefs Rugby Club Limited Partnership', had been established, with the NZRU granting the newly formed company a seven-year licence, until the end of the 2020 season, to operate the club. Chiefs Rugby Club itself is 50% owned by the provincial unions within the Chiefs' catchment and 50% by a group of private investors.

=== Grounds ===
Hamilton	New Plymouth	Rotorua	Pukekohe	Mount Maunganui
FMG Stadium Waikato	Stadium Taranaki	Rotorua International Stadium	Navigation Homes Stadium	Mercury Baypark Stadium and Arena
Capacity: 25,000	Capacity: 26,000	Capacity: 26,000	Capacity: 12,000	Capacity: 19,800

== Development team ==
The Chiefs have fielded a development team in competitions such as the Pacific Rugby Cup and in matches against other representative teams for several seasons. Known as the Chiefs Development XV or the Chiefs Taua, the squad is selected from the best emerging rugby talent in the Chiefs catchment area and is composed of Chiefs contracted players, wider training group members, under 20s, and selected club players.

== Honours ==
=== Super Rugby (1996–present) ===
- Champions (2)

2012, 2013

- Runners-up (5)

2009, 2023, 2024, 2025, 2026

- Playoffs Appearances (16)

2004, 2009, 2012, 2013,
2014, 2015, 2016, 2017, 2018, 2019,
2021, 2022, 2023, 2024, 2025, 2026

- Super Rugby Aotearoa Runners-up (1)

2021

- New Zealand Conference Champions (2)

2012, 2013

- BNZ Cup Winner (2)

2013, 2014

=== Brisbane Global Tens ===
- Champions (1)

2017

== Records and achievements ==
=== Season standings ===
A season-by-season summary of Chiefs regular season results is shown below:

Super 12	Super 14	Super Rugby	Super Rugby Aotearoa	Super Rugby Trans Tasman	Super Rugby Pacific

Season	Pos	Pld	W	D	L	F	A	+/-	BP	Pts	Notes
1996	6th	11	6	0	5	291	269	+22	4	28	
1997	11th	11	4	0	7	272	295	−23	3	19	
1998	7th	11	6	0	5	279	291	−12	5	29	
1999	6th	11	5	0	6	248	301	−53	6	26	
2000	10th	11	3	0	8	257	352	−95	8	20	
2001	6th	11	6	0	5	301	330	−29	4	28	
2002	8th	11	4	0	7	323	341	−18	8	24	
2003	10th	11	2	0	9	257	274	−17	9	17	
2004	4th	11	7	0	4	274	251	+23	5	33	Lost semi-final to Brumbies
2005	6th	11	5	1	5	272	250	+22	6	28	
2006	7th	13	7	1	5	325	298	+27	6	36	
2007	6th	13	7	1	5	373	321	+52	10	40	
2008	7th	13	7	0	6	348	349	−1	6	34	
2009	2nd	13	9	0	4	338	236	+102	9	45	Lost final to Bulls
2010	11th	13	4	1	8	340	418	−78	8	26	
2011	10th	16	6	1	9	332	348	−16	6	40*	^{1}
2012	1st	16	12	0	4	444	358	+86	8	64*	Defeated Sharks in final^{1}
2013	1st	16	12	0	4	458	364	+94	10	66*	Defeated Brumbies in final^{1}
2014	5th	16	8	2	6	384	378	+6	8	44	Lost qualifier to Brumbies
2015	5th	16	10	0	6	372	299	+73	8	48	Lost qualifier to Highlanders
2016	6th	15	11	0	4	491	341	+150	7	51	Lost semifinal to Hurricanes
2017	6th	15	12	1	2	433	292	+141	7	51	Lost semifinal to Crusaders
2018	5th	16	11	0	5	463	368	+95	5	49	Lost quarterfinal to Hurricanes
2019	7th	16	7	2	7	451	465	−14	4	36	Lost quarterfinal to Jaguares
2020	5th	6	4	0	2	194	128	+66	3	19	Season cancelled due to COVID-19^{2}
2020	5th	8	0	0	8	155	212	−57	5	5	No playoffs, round robin only^{3}
2021	2nd	8	5	0	3	187	230	−43	0	20	Lost final to Crusaders^{4}
2021	5th	5	4	0	1	170	111	+59	3	19	^{5}
2022	3rd	14	10	0	4	453	348	+105	5	45	Lost semifinal to Crusaders
2023	2nd	14	13	0	1	487	261	+226	7	59	Lost final to Crusaders
2024	4th	14	9	0	5	486	311	+175	7	43	Lost final to Blues
2025	1st	14	11	0	3	550	319	+231	7	51	Lost final to Crusaders
2026	2nd	14	11	0	3	515	325	+190	7	51	Lost final to Hurricanes 5–60

==== Notes ====
^1 Teams were awarded four points for a bye during the Super Rugby seasons from 2011 to 2013. Each team took two bye rounds each season. These additional 8 points are included in their season points tally.
^2 All matches after Round 7 were cancelled. the season remained incomplete and no champion was awarded.
^3 Super Rugby Aotearoa was announced as a stand-in replacement competition for Super Rugby, between New Zealand Super Rugby sides. It was played as a round robin competition, with no finals. All teams played the other four teams twice, with the title awarded to the highest ranked team at the conclusion of the round robin fixtures.
^4 Super Rugby Aotearoa adopted the same format in 2021 as the inaugural tournament in 2020, with the addition of a final between the top two ranked teams at the conclusion of the round robin stage.
^5 Super Rugby Trans Tasman was a crossover competition between the teams involved in Super Rugby Aotearoa and Super Rugby AU. Each team from Super Rugby AU played each team from Super Rugby Aotearoa once, and vice versa. A final was played between the top two seeded teams at the conclusion of the round robin matches.

=== Results per opposition ===
Chiefs Super Rugby results vs different opponents

Super Rugby
Opposition	Span	Played	Won	Drawn	Lost	Win%
(New Zealand) Blues	1996–2025	44	25	1	18	56.8%
(New Zealand) Crusaders	1996–2025	51	22	0	30	43.1%
(New Zealand) Highlanders	1996–2025	42	24	1	17	57.1%
(New Zealand) Hurricanes	1996–2025	47	21	2	24	44.7%
(Australia) Brumbies	1996–2025	32	15	1	16	46.9%
(Australia) Force	2006–2025	16	14	0	2	87.5%
(Australia) Rebels	2011–2024	11	10	0	1	90.9%
(Australia) Reds	1996–2025	30	17	0	13	56.7%
(Australia) Waratahs	1996–2025	29	15	0	14	51.7%
(South Africa) Bulls	1996–2019	23	13	2	8	56.5%
(South Africa) Cheetahs	1997–2017	11	7	3	1	63.6%
(South Africa) Lions	1996–2018	20	13	0	7	65.0%
(South Africa) Sharks	1998–2019	23	12	0	11	52.2%
(South Africa) Southern Kings	2013–2016	2	2	0	0	100.0%
(South Africa) Stormers	1996–2019	22	12	0	10	54.5%
(Argentina) Jaguares	2016–2019	4	2	0	2	50.0%
(Japan) Sunwolves	2017–2020	4	3	0	1	75.0%
(Fiji) Fijian Drua	2022–2025	4	3	0	1	75.0%
(Samoa) (Tonga) Moana Pasifika	2022–2025	7	7	0	0	100.0%
Overall	1996–2025	422	237	10	175	56.2%
Updated to: 2 June 2025

== Current squad ==
The squad for the 2027 Super Rugby Pacific season is:

2027 Chiefs squad
**Props**: (New Zealand) George Dyer; (Tonga) **Paula Latu**; (New Zealand) Daniel Lienert-Brown; (New Zealand) Tevita Mafileo; (New Zealand) **Ollie Norris**; (New Zealand) Jared Proffit; **Hookers**: (New Zealand) Taine Kolose; (New Zealand) **Brodie McAlister**; (New Zealand) **Samisoni Taukei'aho**; (New Zealand) Tyrone Thompson (injured); **Locks**: (New Zealand) Seuseu Naitoa Ah Kuoi; (New Zealand) Jai Knight; (New Zealand) **Josh Lord**; (New Zealand) Fiti Sa; (New Zealand) Jayden Sa; (New Zealand) **Tupou Vaa'i**; (New Zealand) Aisake Vakasiuola	**Loose forwards**: (New Zealand) Kaylum Boshier; (New Zealand) Jahrome Brown; (New Zealand) **Luke Jacobson**; (New Zealand) Corey Kellow; (New Zealand) **Simon Parker**; (New Zealand) **Wallace Sititi**; **Halfbacks (scrum-halves)**: (New Zealand) Richard Judd; (New Zealand) **Cortez Ratima**; (New Zealand) Charlie Sinton; **First five-eighths (fly-halves)**: (New Zealand) Tepaea Cook-Savage; (New Zealand) Taha Kemara; (New Zealand) **Damian McKenzie**	**Midfielders (centres)**: (New Zealand) Kyle Brown; (New Zealand) **Anton Lienert-Brown**; (New Zealand) Daniel Rona; (New Zealand) **Quinn Tupaea**; **Outside backs**: (New Zealand) **Leroy Carter**; (New Zealand) Isaac Hutchinson; (New Zealand) **Emoni Narawa**; (New Zealand) Daniel Sinkinson; (Tonga) **Kyren Taumoefolau**; (New Zealand) Frank Vaenuku
**Bold** denotes internationally capped players. denotes an injured player. Source:

=== Wider training group ===
The following players were named in the Chiefs wider training group for the 2027 Super Rugby Pacific season:

- (New Zealand) Kurene Luamanuvae (Prop)
- (New Zealand) Will Martin (Prop)
- (Fiji) **Samu Tawake** (Prop)
- (New Zealand) Keightley Watson (Prop)
- (New Zealand) JJ Pokai (Hooker)
- (New Zealand) Mosese Bason (Loose forward)
- (New Zealand) Rui Farrant (Halfback)
- (New Zealand) Andrew Knewstubb (First five-eighth)
- (Fiji) Michael Naitokani (Midfielder)
- (New Zealand) Haki Wiseman (Midfielder)
- (New Zealand) Dallas Rata-Makene (Outside back)
- (Fiji) Nathan Stephens (Outside back)

== Former coaches and captains ==
=== Coaches ===
Chiefs coaches by date, matches and win percentage*
Coach	Period	G	W	D	L	%
Brad Meurant	1996-1997	22	10	0	12	45.45
Ross Cooper	1998–2000	33	14	0	19	42.42
John Mitchell	2001	11	6	0	5	54.55
Kevin Greene	2002–2003	22	6	0	16	27.27
Ian Foster	2004–2011	106	53	5	48	50.00
Dave Rennie	2012–2017	104	71	3	30	68.27
Colin Cooper	2018–2019	34	18	2	14	52.94
Warren Gatland	2020	14	4	0	10	28.57
Clayton McMillan	2021–2025	81	58	0	23	71.60
Jono Gibbes	2026–	17	13	0	4	76.47
Totals (1996–present)^{*}		444	253	10	181	56.98
Updated to: 2 June 2025

Notes:

^* Official Super Rugby competition matches only, including finals.

=== Captains ===
- Richard Turner (1996)
- Ian Jones (1997)
- Errol Brain (1998)
- Michael Collins (1999)
- Glenn Taylor (2000)
- Deon Muir (2001–2002)
- Jono Gibbes (2002–2008)
- Mils Muliaina (2008–2011)
- Liam Messam (2011–2015)
- Craig Clarke (2012–2013)
- Aaron Cruden (2014–2017)
- Brodie Retallick (2014, 2019)
- Sam Cane (2016–2023)
- Charlie Ngatai (2018)
- Brad Weber (2021–2023)
- Luke Jacobson (2024–present)
