= List of Chiefs (Super Rugby) players =

This is a list of rugby union footballers who have played for the Chiefs in Super Rugby. The list includes any player that has played in a regular season match, semi-final or final for the Chiefs, ordered by debut date and name. The Chiefs were a foundation team in the 1996 Super 12 season.

== Players ==
No.	Name	Caps	Tries	C	P	DG	Points	Debut	Last
1	Liam Barry	6						03/03/1996	11/04/1996
2	Frank Bunce	25	1				5	03/03/1996	08/05/1998
3	Simon Crabb	5	1				5	03/03/1996	04/05/1996
4	Ian Foster	26	2	32	29	2	167	03/03/1996	15/05/1998
5	Steve Gordon	2						03/03/1996	10/03/1996
6	Ian Jones	37	4				20	03/03/1996	14/05/1999
7	Blair Larsen	23	2				10	03/03/1996	15/05/1998
8	Walter Little	36	7	1			37	03/03/1996	14/05/1999
9	Slade McFarland	6						03/03/1996	20/04/1996
10	Glen Osborne	19	8				40	03/03/1996	15/05/1998
11	Eric Rush	18	10				50	03/03/1996	08/05/1998
12	Craig Stevenson	11						03/03/1996	04/05/1996
13	Richard Turner	9	2				10	03/03/1996	28/04/1996
14	Joe Veitayaki	11	2				10	03/03/1996	04/05/1996
15	Peter Woods	3						03/03/1996	20/04/1996
16	Dean Anglesey	13	2				10	10/03/1996	26/04/1997
17	Norm Berryman	9	1				5	10/03/1996	04/05/1996
18	Boyd Gillespie	7						10/03/1996	20/04/1996
19	Duane Monkley	9	1				5	17/03/1996	04/05/1996
20	Warren Burton	5		7	11		47	23/03/1996	16/04/1996
21	Mark Cooksley	24	1				5	23/03/1996	11/05/2001
22	Scott McLeod	44	8				40	23/03/1996	11/05/2001
23	Milton Going	4	2				10	30/03/1996	04/05/1996
24	Warren Johnston	3	1				5	30/03/1996	04/05/1996
25	Paul Mitchell	33	4				20	30/03/1996	11/05/2001
26	Steve Simpkins	3						03/04/1996	04/05/1996
27	Glenn Taylor	29	3				15	11/04/1996	06/04/2003
28	Errol Brain	19	2				10	28/02/1997	15/05/1998
29	Michael Collins	82	4				20	28/02/1997	14/05/2005
30	Matthew Cooper	25	3	25	50		215	28/02/1997	14/05/1999
31	Richard Loe	9						28/02/1997	16/05/1997
32	Mark Robinson	12	1				5	28/02/1997	18/04/1998
33	Greg Smith	42						28/02/1997	29/03/2003
34	Dion Mathews	3	1				5	15/03/1997	29/03/1997
35	Bruce Reihana	58	23	1	2		123	15/03/1997	10/05/2002
36	Rhys Duggan	54	4				20	22/03/1997	14/05/2005
37	Aaron Hopa	7	1				5	22/03/1997	16/05/1997
38	Damon Kaui	2						22/03/1997	29/03/1997
39	Lee Lidgard	14						22/03/1997	14/05/1999
40	Blair Feeney	5		2	2		10	29/03/1997	26/02/1999
41	Richard Coventry	3						11/04/1997	16/05/1997
42	Deon Muir	33	5				25	11/04/1997	04/05/2002
43	Pita Alatini	3						03/05/1997	16/05/1997
44	Caleb Ralph	3	3				15	03/05/1997	16/05/1997
45	Brett Sinkinson	3						03/05/1997	16/05/1997
46	Jason Barrell	11						28/02/1998	15/05/1998
47	Justin Collins	11	1				5	28/02/1998	15/05/1998
48	Nick Holten	20						28/02/1998	21/04/2000
49	Leon MacDonald	5		1	7		23	28/02/1998	04/04/1998
50	Glen Marsh	30	6				30	28/02/1998	13/05/2000
51	Todd Miller	41	6				30	28/02/1998	15/05/2004
52	Roger Randle	59	32				160	28/02/1998	26/04/2003
53	Brett McCormack	7						13/03/1998	15/05/1998
54	Nick Moore	8	1				5	21/03/1998	15/05/1998
55	Troy Flavell	7	1				5	04/04/1998	15/05/1998
56	Jason Hammond	4						04/04/1998	15/05/1998
57	Frano Botica	1						25/04/1998	25/04/1998
58	Craig McGrath	1						02/05/1998	02/05/1998
59	John Akurangi	8	1				5	26/02/1999	14/05/1999
60	David Briggs	31						26/02/1999	10/05/2003
61	Glen Jackson	60	9	80	90	2	481	26/02/1999	15/05/2004
62	Paul Martin	19						26/02/1999	13/05/2000
63	Dylan Mika	11	3				15	26/02/1999	14/05/1999
64	Royce Willis	26	1				5	26/02/1999	10/05/2002
65	Chresten Davis	35	1				5	06/03/1999	19/04/2003
66	Danny Lee	31	6				30	06/03/1999	04/05/2002
67	Api Naevo	7						13/03/1999	14/05/1999
68	Mark Ranby	73	6				30	13/03/1999	13/05/2006
69	Koula Tukino	21	1				5	13/03/1999	14/04/2001
70	Jonah Lomu	8	2				10	26/03/1999	14/05/1999
71	Paul Tito	5						26/03/1999	14/05/1999
72	Leo Lafaiali'i	1						03/04/1999	03/04/1999
73	Andrew Roose	1						30/04/1999	30/04/1999
74	Ben Willis	1						30/04/1999	30/04/1999
75	Loki Crichton	46	11	4	11	1	99	27/02/2000	21/04/2006
76	Damian Karauna	6	1				5	27/02/2000	15/04/2000
77	George Leaupepe	11	2				10	27/02/2000	13/05/2000
78	Keith Lowen	50	12	1			62	27/02/2000	14/05/2005
79	Isitolo Maka	10	3				15	27/02/2000	13/05/2000
80	Hare Makiri	8						18/03/2000	13/05/2000
81	Simon Kerr	1						09/04/2000	09/04/2000
82	James Kerr	2						21/04/2000	29/04/2000
83	Duncan Blaikie	8						24/02/2001	11/05/2001
84	Guy Coleman	19	1				5	24/02/2001	10/05/2002
85	Jono Gibbes	69	6			1	33	24/02/2001	17/05/2008
86	Daniel Godbold	1						24/02/2001	24/02/2001
87	David Hill	58	5	83	66		389	24/02/2001	13/05/2006
88	Marty Holah	81	3				15	24/02/2001	04/05/2007
89	Tim Knight	7						24/02/2001	14/04/2001
90	Deacon Manu	51	1				5	24/02/2001	13/05/2006
91	Keith Robinson	42						24/02/2001	04/05/2007
92	Karl Te Nana	7	2				10	24/02/2001	20/04/2002
93	Tama Tuirirangi	6						03/03/2001	14/04/2001
94	Isaac Boss	20	3				15	10/03/2001	15/05/2004
95	Nick Collins	8	4				20	10/03/2001	10/05/2002
96	Chris Masoe	1						10/03/2001	10/03/2001
97	Anton Edwards	2						30/03/2001	08/04/2001
98	Dennis Hazleton	4						21/04/2001	11/05/2001
99	Tom Willis	43	1				5	21/04/2001	17/05/2008
100	Kristian Ormsby	35	3				15	11/05/2001	16/02/2008
101	Keven Mealamu	11	1				5	23/02/2002	10/05/2002
102	Mark Weedon	4	1				5	23/02/2002	30/03/2002
103	Steven Bates	57	7				35	01/03/2002	04/05/2007
104	Tony Philp	8						09/03/2002	29/03/2003
105	Scott Couch	19						23/03/2002	15/05/2004
106	Shayne Austin	6	3				15	21/02/2003	10/05/2003
107	Regan King	11	2				10	21/02/2003	10/05/2003
108	Aleki Lutui	29	2				10	21/02/2003	13/05/2006
109	Paul Miller	2	2				10	21/02/2003	29/03/2003
110	Reece Robinson	8						21/02/2003	10/05/2003
111	Sitiveni Sivivatu	89	42				210	21/02/2003	18/06/2011
112	Tevita Taumoepeau	8						21/02/2003	10/05/2003
113	Shane Carter	10	2				10	01/03/2003	10/05/2003
114	Wayne Ormond	25						12/04/2003	14/05/2005
115	Kevin Senio	9						12/04/2003	14/05/2005
116	Simms Davison	52	2				10	21/02/2004	03/05/2008
117	Dave Duley	4						21/02/2004	30/04/2004
118	Lome Fa'atau	12	5				25	21/02/2004	15/05/2004
119	Byron Kelleher	38	4				20	21/02/2004	04/05/2007
120	Sione Lauaki	70	14				70	21/02/2004	23/04/2010
121	Sean Hohneck	27	1				5	05/03/2004	13/05/2006
122	Derek Maisey	10	2				10	05/03/2004	18/03/2005
123	Ben Castle	42	1				5	20/03/2004	17/05/2008
124	Grant McQuoid	8						20/03/2004	14/05/2005
125	Scott Linklater	21						27/03/2004	13/05/2006
126	John Pareanga	2						10/04/2004	23/04/2004
127	Bernie Upton	22	1				5	23/04/2004	13/05/2006
128	Adrian Cashmore	10						15/05/2004	14/05/2005
129	Sosene Anesi	40	12				60	25/02/2005	22/05/2009
130	Stephen Donald	105	21	155	156	1	886	25/02/2005	27/04/2019
131	Sailosi Tagicakibau	7	1				5	25/02/2005	30/04/2005
132	Josh Hohneck	19	2				10	12/03/2005	27/06/2014
133	Nili Latu	4	1				5	09/04/2005	29/04/2006
134	Niva Ta'auso	16	5				25	09/04/2005	07/04/2007
135	Liam Messam	183	31				155	11/02/2006	29/05/2021
136	Mils Muliaina	61	14				70	11/02/2006	12/04/2014
137	Jamie Nutbrown	23	1				5	11/02/2006	17/05/2008
138	Sam Tuitupou	13	4				20	11/02/2006	13/05/2006
139	Anthony Tahana	8	2				10	17/02/2006	03/02/2007
140	Lelia Masaga	91	38				190	24/02/2006	03/08/2013
141	Sam Biddles	1						01/04/2006	01/04/2006
142	Nathan White	40						01/04/2006	18/06/2011
143	Aled de Malmanche	62	2				10	03/02/2007	18/06/2011
144	Tanerau Latimer	108	7				35	03/02/2007	19/07/2014
145	Tasesa Lavea	7	4				20	03/02/2007	27/04/2007
146	Brendon Leonard	73	18				90	03/02/2007	03/05/2013
147	Toby Lynn	32						03/02/2007	30/05/2009
148	Dwayne Sweeney	69	10	4			58	03/02/2007	19/07/2014
149	Tane Tuʻipulotu	12	2				10	03/02/2007	04/05/2007
150	Roy Kinikinilau	12	4				20	09/02/2007	04/05/2007
151	Craig West	3						09/02/2007	24/03/2007
152	Murray Williams	4						16/02/2007	22/03/2008
153	Richard Kahui	60	15				75	24/02/2007	19/04/2013
154	Jared Payne	3						16/03/2007	21/04/2007
155	Andrew van der Heijden	1						16/03/2007	16/03/2007
156	Callum Bruce	34	6	4	1	1	44	16/02/2008	08/05/2010
157	Hayden Hopgood	4						16/02/2008	17/05/2008
158	Ben May	33						16/02/2008	18/06/2011
159	Kevin O'Neill	32						16/02/2008	15/05/2010
160	David Bason	6						23/02/2008	30/05/2009
161	Tom Harding	3						23/02/2008	14/03/2008
162	Faifili Levave	12	1				5	23/02/2008	17/05/2008
163	Viliame Waqaseduadua	7	2				10	23/02/2008	17/05/2008
164	Matt France	1						29/02/2008	29/02/2008
165	Vern Kamo	5						14/03/2008	23/04/2010
166	Jay Williams	6						22/03/2008	03/05/2008
167	Simon Lemalu	2						26/04/2008	10/05/2008
168	Colin Bourke	15	3				15	14/02/2009	15/05/2010
169	Craig Clarke	71	2				10	14/02/2009	03/08/2013
170	Mike Delany	29	2	7	13		63	14/02/2009	15/04/2011
171	Hika Elliot	116	11				55	14/02/2009	20/06/2017
172	James McGougan	16						14/02/2009	23/04/2010
173	Toby Morland	14	2				10	14/02/2009	30/05/2009
174	Sona Taumalolo	52	15				75	14/02/2009	04/08/2012
175	Serge Lilo	12	1				5	20/02/2009	30/05/2009
176	Jackson Willison	39	6				30	20/02/2009	04/08/2012
177	Mark Burman	1						06/03/2009	06/03/2009
178	Joe Savage	2						06/03/2009	30/05/2009
179	James Wilson	1						14/03/2009	14/03/2009
180	Tim Mikkelson	4						18/04/2009	15/05/2010
181	Ben Afeaki	36	1				5	13/02/2010	21/02/2014
182	Jason Hona	4						13/02/2010	15/05/2010
183	Tim Nanai-Williams	84	26		3		139	13/02/2010	29/07/2017
184	Junior Poluleuligaga	12	1				5	13/02/2010	15/05/2010
185	Culum Retallick	20						13/02/2010	18/06/2011
186	Luke Braid	9						19/02/2010	15/05/2010
187	Jarrad Hoeata	5						19/02/2010	09/04/2010
188	Romana Graham	19	1				5	27/02/2010	22/03/2013
189	Toby Smith	37	3				15	05/03/2010	03/08/2013
190	Trent Renata	2						01/05/2010	15/05/2010
191	Phil Burleigh	2						08/05/2010	15/05/2010
192	Save Tokula	7						08/05/2010	17/05/2013
193	Tristan Moran	1						15/05/2010	15/05/2010
194	Siale Piutau	1						15/05/2010	15/05/2010
195	Tawera Kerr-Barlow	83	10				50	19/02/2011	29/07/2017
196	Fritz Lee	21	2				10	19/02/2011	19/04/2013
197	Dan Perrin	2						19/02/2011	25/02/2011
198	Hayden Triggs	3						19/02/2011	23/04/2011
199	Tana Umaga	7	1				5	19/02/2011	04/06/2011
200	Scott Waldrom	14	3				15	19/02/2011	02/06/2012
201	Isaac Ross	11	1				5	25/02/2011	10/06/2011
202	Steven Setephano	2						25/02/2011	05/03/2011
203	Taniela Moa	4						05/03/2011	26/03/2011
204	Sam Cane	150	17				85	23/04/2011	24/06/2023
205	Taiasina Tuifu'a	2						14/05/2011	21/05/2011
206	Matt Vant Leven	12	1				5	04/06/2011	03/08/2013
207	Sonny Bill Williams	28	6				30	25/02/2012	20/06/2015
208	Aaron Cruden	100	15	116	137	1	721	25/02/2012	01/08/2020
209	Michael Fitzgerald	59	1				5	25/02/2012	20/06/2015
210	Brodie Retallick	128	20				100	25/02/2012	24/06/2023
211	Robbie Robinson	24	3				15	25/02/2012	03/08/2013
212	Mahonri Schwalger	40						25/02/2012	19/07/2014
213	Asaeli Tikoirotuma	45	13				65	25/02/2012	19/07/2014
214	Shane Cleaver	2						02/03/2012	09/03/2012
215	Andrew Horrell	56	4	8	6		54	02/03/2012	08/07/2016
216	Declan O'Donnell	3						02/03/2012	16/03/2018
217	Augustine Pulu	51	6				30	02/03/2012	13/06/2015
218	Ben Tameifuna	65	9				45	02/03/2012	20/06/2015
219	Kane Thompson	19	1				5	02/03/2012	24/05/2014
220	Alex Bradley	6						14/04/2012	06/07/2012
221	Maritino Nemani	4						21/04/2012	02/06/2012
222	Bundee Aki	25	10				50	22/02/2013	19/07/2014
223	Gareth Anscombe	27	8	39	44		250	22/02/2013	19/07/2014
224	Pauliasi Manu	48	1				5	22/02/2013	19/03/2016
225	Rhys Marshall	31	1				5	22/02/2013	14/06/2016
226	Charlie Ngatai	55	19	1			97	22/02/2013	20/07/2018
227	Patrick Osborne	9	2				10	22/02/2013	05/07/2013
228	Nick Crosswell	10						09/03/2013	25/04/2014
229	Ross Filipo	7						15/03/2013	30/05/2015
230	Mike Kainga	3						13/04/2013	27/04/2013
231	Dan Waenga	1						24/05/2013	24/05/2013
232	Robbie Fruean	4	1				5	21/02/2014	27/06/2014
233	Nathan Harris	62	8				40	21/02/2014	15/05/2021
234	Tevita Koloamatangi	10	2				10	21/02/2014	30/07/2016
235	James Lowe	53	26	1			132	21/02/2014	29/07/2017
236	Jamie Mackintosh	22	1				5	21/02/2014	13/06/2015
237	Matt Symons	28	1				5	21/02/2014	20/06/2015
238	Brad Weber	123	27	2			139	21/02/2014	24/06/2023
239	Liam Squire	14	2				10	01/03/2014	16/05/2015
240	Tom Marshall	29	5				25	14/03/2014	13/06/2015
241	Anton Lienert-Brown	126	23				115	29/03/2014	25/04/2025
242	Jordan Payne	2						12/04/2014	19/04/2014
243	Nick Barrett	1						19/07/2014	19/07/2014
244	Johan Bardoul	11						14/02/2015	19/03/2016
245	Jarrod Firth	2						14/02/2015	06/06/2015
246	Bryce Heem	16	4				20	14/02/2015	20/06/2015
247	Damian McKenzie	151	46	344	204	1	1,591	14/02/2015	20/06/2026
248	Marty McKenzie	31	1	27	9		86	14/02/2015	21/06/2019
249	Siate Tokolahi	28						14/02/2015	08/07/2016
250	Maama Vaipulu	18						14/02/2015	07/05/2016
251	Hosea Gear	6						20/02/2015	30/05/2015
252	Tumua Manu	21	4				20	20/02/2015	05/07/2020
253	Sean Polwart	1						20/02/2015	20/02/2015
254	Seta Tamanivalu	22	9				45	20/02/2015	30/07/2016
255	Mitchell Graham	26	1				5	28/02/2015	30/07/2016
256	Quentin MacDonald	13						28/02/2015	13/06/2015
257	Michael Allardice	46						06/03/2015	13/03/2020
258	Michael Leitch	34	7				35	14/03/2015	29/07/2017
259	Brian Alainu'uese	2						22/05/2015	30/05/2015
260	Mitchell Crosswell	3						30/05/2015	20/06/2015
261	Tom Sanders	20	4				20	27/02/2016	15/07/2017
262	Taleni Seu	45	4				20	27/02/2016	11/05/2019
263	Shaun Stevenson	110	34	1			172	27/02/2016	21/06/2025
264	Latu Vaeno	3						27/02/2016	14/06/2016
265	Hiroshi Yamashita	9						27/02/2016	01/07/2016
266	Glen Fisiiahi	3	1				5	05/03/2016	19/03/2016
267	Sam McNicol	19	3				15	12/03/2016	22/02/2020
268	Atu Moli	55	3				15	12/03/2016	03/06/2023
269	James Tucker	5						12/03/2016	15/07/2017
270	Siegfried Fisi'ihoi	25						26/03/2016	20/06/2017
271	Kayne Hammington	6						26/03/2016	14/06/2016
272	Sam Henwood	2						26/03/2016	08/04/2016
273	Toni Pulu	33	15				75	26/03/2016	13/07/2018
274	Dominic Bird	29	3				15	08/04/2016	24/02/2018
275	Lachlan Boshier	64	17				85	29/04/2016	12/06/2021
276	Kane Hames	25	2				10	29/04/2016	29/07/2017
277	Sam Vaka	4	1				5	07/05/2016	14/06/2016
278	Mitchell Brown	60	3				15	14/06/2016	04/06/2022
279	Johnny Fa'auli	18	3				15	24/02/2017	13/07/2018
280	Mitchell Karpik	30	3				15	24/02/2017	05/03/2021
281	Nepo Laulala	41	1				5	24/02/2017	08/08/2020
282	Samisoni Taukei'aho	121	34				170	24/02/2017	20/06/2026
283	Jonathan Taumateine	11						24/02/2017	27/04/2019
284	Finlay Christie	9						10/03/2017	29/07/2017
285	Sebastian Siataga	2						10/03/2017	17/03/2017
286	Solomon Alaimalo	48	18				90	17/03/2017	24/02/2023
287	Brayden Mitchell	5						01/04/2017	29/04/2017
288	Sefo Kautai	11						08/04/2017	24/05/2019
289	Alex Nankivell	70	13				65	08/04/2017	24/06/2023
290	Aidan Ross	101	3				15	22/04/2017	21/06/2025
291	Liam Polwart	25	2				10	03/06/2017	18/05/2019
292	Luteru Laulala	2						20/06/2017	19/05/2018
293	Chase Tiatia	22	5				25	20/06/2017	10/06/2022
294	Angus Taʻavao	62	6				30	24/02/2018	10/06/2022
295	Te Toiroa Tahuriorangi	61	5				25	24/02/2018	06/06/2026
296	Sean Wainui	44	18				90	24/02/2018	12/06/2021
297	Tyler Ardron	30	5				25	02/03/2018	06/03/2020
298	Tiaan Falcon	4						02/03/2018	15/02/2020
299	Luke Jacobson	106	17				85	02/03/2018	20/06/2026
300	Karl Tu'inukuafe	16	1				5	02/03/2018	20/07/2018
301	Bailyn Sullivan	8	1				5	24/03/2018	06/06/2021
302	Jeff Thwaites	11						24/03/2018	07/07/2018
303	Pita Gus Sowakula	69	12				60	30/03/2018	24/06/2023
304	Sam Prattley	10						21/04/2018	20/07/2018
305	Jesse Parete	24	3				15	04/05/2018	21/06/2019
306	Matt Matich	2						19/05/2018	26/05/2018
307	Orbyn Leger	3						15/02/2019	15/02/2020
308	Etene Nanai-Seturo	69	21				105	15/02/2019	28/03/2026
309	Tevita Mafileo	7						15/02/2019	27/04/2019
310	Ataata Moeakiola	9	3				15	15/02/2019	18/05/2019
311	Bradley Slater	67	7				35	02/03/2019	30/05/2025
312	Jack Debreczeni	7	2	13	2		42	09/03/2019	21/06/2019
313	Ryan Coxon	6						15/03/2019	13/06/2020
314	Mitch Jacobson	4						18/05/2019	26/03/2022
315	Daymon Leasuasu	2						24/05/2019	01/06/2019
316	Seuseu Naitoa Ah Kuoi	94	5				25	31/01/2020	20/06/2026
317	Kaleb Trask	24	5	10			45	31/01/2020	25/04/2025
318	Quinn Tupaea	79	20				100	31/01/2020	20/06/2026
319	Ross Geldenhuys	11						08/02/2020	26/07/2020
320	Ollie Norris	81	2				10	08/02/2020	20/06/2026
321	Dylan Nel	4						15/02/2020	05/07/2020
322	Reuben O'Neill	51	1				5	15/02/2020	11/04/2026
323	Adam Thomson	5						15/02/2020	26/07/2020
324	Lisati Milo-Harris	5						22/02/2020	08/08/2020
325	Donald Maka	1						06/03/2020	06/03/2020
326	Tupou Vaa'i	88	18				90	13/06/2020	20/06/2026
327	Simon Parker	50	4				20	01/08/2020	20/06/2026
328	Rob Cobb	1						08/08/2020	08/08/2020
329	Kini Naholo	1						08/08/2020	08/08/2020
330	Samipeni Finau	75	11				55	05/03/2021	20/06/2026
331	Bryn Gatland	32	4	54	16		176	05/03/2021	05/05/2023
332	Jonah Lowe	18	7				35	05/03/2021	10/06/2022
333	Sione Mafileo	13					05/03/2021	26/03/2022	
334	Xavier Roe	60	9				45	05/03/2021	20/06/2026
335	Kaylum Boshier	49	10				50	13/03/2021	20/06/2026
336	Josh Lord	46	1				5	13/03/2021	20/06/2026
337	Joe Apikotoa	5						20/03/2021	15/05/2021
338	Rameka Poihipi	45	4	5	1		33	23/04/2021	21/02/2025
339	Tom Florence	4						01/05/2021	16/03/2024
340	Zane Kapeli	7						01/05/2021	12/06/2021
341	Ezekiel Lindenmuth	1						01/05/2021	01/05/2021
342	Rivez Reihana	9	1				5	01/05/2021	03/06/2023
343	Viliami Taulani	2	1				5	01/05/2021	12/06/2021
344	Gideon Wrampling	14	2				10	01/05/2021	14/06/2025
345	Josh Ioane	29	5	14	7		74	19/02/2022	01/06/2024
346	Laghlan McWhannell	7	1				5	19/02/2022	03/06/2023
347	Emoni Narawa	54	32				160	19/02/2022	04/04/2026
348	George Dyer	69	3				15	12/03/2022	20/06/2026
349	Cortez Ratima	74	24				120	12/03/2022	20/06/2026
350	Hamilton Burr	3	1				5	19/03/2022	10/05/2024
351	Tyrone Thompson	31	8				40	19/03/2022	30/05/2026
352	Solomone Tukuafu	2						19/03/2022	21/04/2023
353	Inga Finau	3						22/04/2022	21/05/2022
354	Josh Bartlett	1						21/05/2022	21/05/2022
355	Liam Coombes-Fabling	21	7				35	24/02/2023	20/06/2026
356	John Ryan	17						24/02/2023	24/06/2023
357	Jared Proffit	37	1				5	04/03/2023	20/06/2026
358	Ngane Punivai	1						04/03/2023	04/03/2023
359	Daniel Rona	45	16				80	10/03/2023	30/05/2026
360	Peniasi Malimali	5	1				5	18/03/2023	01/06/2024
361	Manaaki Selby-Rickit	20	1				5	18/03/2023	11/04/2025
362	Lalomilo Lalomilo	2						29/04/2023	03/06/2023
363	Jimmy Tupou	15	1				5	23/02/2024	21/06/2025
364	Josh Jacomb	37	6	38	8		130	09/03/2024	20/06/2026
365	Wallace Sititi	29	8				40	09/03/2024	06/06/2026
366	Sione Ahio	15	1				5	06/04/2024	20/06/2026
367	Kauvaka Kaivelata	1						04/05/2024	04/05/2024
368	Mills Sanerivi	1						22/06/2024	22/06/2024
369	Leroy Carter	26	14				70	15/02/2025	20/06/2026
370	Brodie McAlister	23	2				10	15/02/2025	20/06/2026
371	Jahrome Brown	14						21/02/2025	30/05/2026
372	Manasa Mataele	2	1				5	01/03/2025	30/05/2025
373	Malachi Wrampling	1						08/03/2025	08/03/2025
374	James Thompson	1						21/03/2025	21/03/2025
375	Kyren Taumoefolau	13	10				50	14/02/2026	20/06/2026
376	Benet Kumeroa	8						14/02/2026	30/05/2026
377	Kyle Brown	11	2				10	14/02/2026	20/06/2026
378	Tepaea Cook-Savage	6	1	1			7	14/02/2026	30/05/2026
379	Lalakai Foketi	9	1				5	28/02/2026	12/06/2026
380	Fiti Sa	6						28/03/2026	30/05/2026
381	Daniel Sinkinson	5	4				20	04/04/2026	06/06/2026
382	Reon Paul	5	1				5	11/04/2026	20/06/2026
383	Isaac Hutchinson	6	2				10	26/04/2026	12/06/2026
384	Michael Loft	1						26/04/2026	26/04/2026
385	Keran van Staden	1						30/05/2026	30/05/2026
