= 2004 Super 12 season =

Men's rugby union club competition

2004 Super 12
- Countries: Australia; South Africa; New Zealand
- Tournament format(s): Round-robin and knockout
- Champions: (Australia) ACT Brumbies (2nd title)
- Matches played: 69
- Top point scorer(s): (New Zealand) Dan Carter (201) (Canterbury Crusaders)
- Top try scorer(s): (Australia) Mark Gerrard (10) (ACT Brumbies) (Australia) Stirling Mortlock (10) (ACT Brumbies)

The 2004 Super 12 season was the ninth season of the Super 12, contested by teams from Australia, New Zealand and South Africa. The season ran from February to May 2004, with each team playing all the others once. At the end of the regular season, the top four teams entered the playoff semi finals, with the first placed team playing the fourth and the second placed team playing the third. The winner of each semi final qualified for the final, which was contested by the Brumbies and the Crusaders at Canberra Stadium. The Brumbies won 47–38 to win their second Super 12 title.

== Table ==
Key to colours
Top four teams advance to playoffs.

	Team	Pld	W	D	L	PF	PA	PD	BP	Pts
1	(Australia) Brumbies	11	8	0	3	408	269	+139	8	40
2	(New Zealand) Crusaders	11	7	0	4	345	303	+42	6	34
3	(South Africa) Stormers	11	7	0	4	286	260	+26	5	33
4	(New Zealand) Chiefs	11	7	0	4	274	251	+23	5	33
5	(New Zealand) Blues	11	6	1	4	337	309	+28	6	32
6	(South Africa) Bulls	11	5	1	5	302	320	−18	6	28
7	(South Africa) Sharks	11	5	0	6	267	305	−38	8	28
8	(Australia) Waratahs	11	5	0	6	342	274	+68	7	27
9	(New Zealand) Highlanders	11	4	1	6	299	347	−48	8	26
10	(Australia) Reds	11	5	0	6	217	246	−29	5	25
11	(New Zealand) Hurricanes	11	4	1	6	275	303	−28	5	23
12	(South Africa) Cats	11	1	0	10	294	459	−165	7	11

== Results ==
=== Round 1 ===
20 February 2004	Otago Highlanders (New Zealand)	39–8	(Australia) Queensland Reds	Rugby Park Stadium, Invercargill
19:35	Try: Filipo Levi (2); Aisea Tuilevu; Sam Harding; Josh Blackie; Con: Tony Brown (3); Nick Evans; Pen: Tony Brown (2)		Try: Sean Hardman; Pen: Elton Flatley	Referee: Tappe Henning (South Africa)

20 February 2004	Golden Cats (South Africa)	23–28	(South Africa) Stormers	Ellis Park, Johannesburg
19:10	Try: Wikus van Heerden; Anton Pitout; Con: André Pretorius (2); Pen: André Pretorius (3)		Try: Breyton Paulse; Adri Badenhorst; Hendrik Gerber; Con: Chris Rossouw (2); Pen: Chris Rossouw (3)	Referee: Michael Katzenellenbogen (South Africa)

21 February 2004	Canterbury Crusaders (New Zealand)	19–43	(Australia) NSW Waratahs	Jade Stadium, Christchurch
17:30	Try: Richie McCaw; Con: Dan Carter; Pen: Dan Carter (4)		Try: Mat Rogers; Milton Thaiday; Nathan Grey; Tim Donnelly; Con: Mat Rogers (4); Pen: Mat Rogers (5)	Referee: Mark Lawrence (South Africa)

21 February 2004	Waikato Chiefs (New Zealand)	19–7	(New Zealand) Wellington Hurricanes	Waikato Stadium, Hamilton
19:35	Try: Sione Lauaki; Con: Glen Jackson; Pen: Glen Jackson (4)		Try: Penalty try Con: Riki Flutey	Referee: Steve Walsh (New Zealand)

21 February 2004	ACT Brumbies (Australia)	44–27	(New Zealand) Auckland Blues	Canberra Stadium, Canberra
19:40	Try: Stirling Mortlock; Matt Giteau; Stephen Larkham; Owen Finegan; Jeremy Paul; Con: Joe Roff (4); Matt Giteau; Pen: Joe Roff (2); Matt Giteau		Try: Rupeni Caucaunibuca; Carlos Spencer; Keven Mealamu; Con: Carlos Spencer (3); Pen: Carlos Spencer (2)	Attendance: 22,225; Referee: André Watson (South Africa)

21 February 2004	Northern Bulls (South Africa)	18–23	(South Africa) Coastal Sharks	Loftus Versfeld, Pretoria
17:05	Try: Frikkie Welsh; Derick Hougaard; Con: Derick Hougaard; Pen: Derick Hougaard (2)		Try: Brent Russell; Adrian Jacobs; Con: Butch James (2); Pen: Butch James (3)	Referee: Jonathan Kaplan (South Africa)

=== Round 2 ===
27 February 2004	Canterbury Crusaders (New Zealand)	29–38	(New Zealand) Auckland Blues	Jade Stadium, Christchurch
19:35	Try: Ben Blair; Dan Carter; Reuben Thorne; Con: Dan Carter; Pen: Dan Carter (4)		Try: Rupeni Caucaunibuca (3); Carlos Spencer (2); Mils Muliaina; Con: Carlos Spencer (4)	Referee: André Watson (South Africa)

27 February 2004	ACT Brumbies (Australia)	68–28	(South Africa) Golden Cats	Canberra Stadium, Canberra
19:40	Try: Stirling Mortlock (2); Mark Gerrard (2); Mark Chisholm (2); Clyde Rathbone; Matt Giteau; Tamaiti Horua; Mark Bartholomeusz; Con: Joe Roff (9)		Try: Jaque Fourie; Wikus van Heerden; Pietie Ferreira; Doppies la Grange; Con: André Pretorius (4)	Attendance: 19,815; Referee: Lyndon Bray (New Zealand)

28 February 2004	NSW Waratahs (Australia)	48–14	(South Africa) Coastal Sharks	Sydney Football Stadium, Sydney
19:00	Try: Mat Rogers; Milton Thaiday; Ben Jacobs; Tim Donnelly; Phil Waugh; Cameron Shepherd; Con: Mat Rogers (6); Pen: Mat Rogers (2)		Try: Gregor Townsend; Trevor Halstead; Con: Butch James (2)	Attendance: 31,379; Referee: Kelvin Deaker (New Zealand)

28 February 2004	Queensland Reds (Australia)	39–25	(New Zealand) Waikato Chiefs	Ballymore Stadium, Brisbane
20:00	Try: Steve Kefu (2); Chris Latham; Wendell Sailor; Todd Feather; Con: Elton Flatley (3); Todd Feather; Pen: Elton Flatley (2)		Try: Sitiveni Sivivatu; Glen Jackson; Sione Lauaki; Con: Glen Jackson; David Hill; Pen: Glen Jackson (2)	Attendance: 15,707; Referee: Shaun Veldsman (South Africa)

28 February 2004	Stormers (South Africa)	46–25	(New Zealand) Otago Highlanders	Newlands Stadium, Cape Town
17:05	Try: De Wet Barry (2); Werner Greeff; Bolla Conradie; Quinton Davids; Gavin Hume; Con: Chris Rossouw (5); Pen: Chris Rossouw (2)		Try: Aisea Tuilevu; Seilala Mapusua; Josh Blackie; Con: Tony Brown (2); Pen: Tony Brown (2)	Referee: Andrew Cole (Australia)

28 February 2004	Northern Bulls (South Africa)	40–19	(New Zealand) Wellington Hurricanes	Loftus Versfeld, Pretoria
19:10	Try: Frikkie Welsh (2); Eddie Fredericks; Anton Leonard; Con: Derick Hougaard (4); Pen: Derick Hougaard (3); Drop: Derick Hougaard		Try: Andrew Hore (2); Brent Ward; Con: Piri Weepu (2)	Referee: Stuart Dickinson (Australia)

=== Round 3 ===
5 March 2004	Auckland Blues (New Zealand)	20–27	(New Zealand) Waikato Chiefs	Eden Park, Auckland
19:35	Try: Doug Howlett (2); Con: Carlos Spencer (2); Pen: Carlos Spencer; Ben Atiga		Try: Keith Lowen; Michael Collins; Sione Lauaki; Con: David Hill (3); Pen: David Hill (2)	Referee: Kelvin Deaker (New Zealand)

5 March 2004	NSW Waratahs (Australia)	46–10	(South Africa) Golden Cats	Sydney Football Stadium, Sydney
19:40	Try: Mat Rogers (2); Nathan Grey; Lote Tuqiri; Phil Waugh; Chris Whitaker; Con: Mat Rogers (5); Pen: Mat Rogers (2)		Try: Pietie Ferreira; Con: André Pretorius; Pen: André Pretorius	Attendance: 28,555; Referee: Paddy O'Brien (New Zealand)

5 March 2004	Northern Bulls (South Africa)	16–16	(New Zealand) Otago Highlanders	Loftus Versfeld, Pretoria
19:10	Try: Ettienne Botha; Con: Willem De Waal; Pen: Derick Hougaard (3)		Try: Nick Evans; Con: Tony Brown; Pen: Tony Brown (3)	Referee: Andrew Cole (Australia)

6 March 2004	ACT Brumbies (Australia)	23–20	(South Africa) Coastal Sharks	Canberra Stadium, Canberra
19:00	Try: Mark Gerrard; Bill Young; Con: Joe Roff (2); Pen: Joe Roff (3)		Try: Graig Davidson; Pen: Butch James (5)	Attendance: 18,064; Referee: Steve Walsh (New Zealand)

6 March 2004	Queensland Reds (Australia)	17–20	(New Zealand) Canterbury Crusaders	Ballymore Stadium, Brisbane
20:00	Try: Steve Kefu; John Roe; Con: Elton Flatley (2); Pen: Elton Flatley		Try: Corey Flynn; Pen: Dan Carter (5)	Attendance: 16,977; Referee: Tappe Henning (South Africa)

6 March 2004	Stormers (South Africa)	19–25	(New Zealand) Wellington Hurricanes	Newlands Stadium, Cape Town
17:05	Try: Pieter Rossouw; Con: Chris Rossouw; Pen: Chris Rossouw (4)		Try: Andrew Hore; Brent Ward; Tane Tuipulotu; Con: Riki Flutey (2); Pen: Riki Flutey (2)	Referee: Scott Young (Australia)

=== Round 4 ===
12 March 2004	Otago Highlanders (New Zealand)	35–36	(South Africa) Coastal Sharks	Carisbrook, Dunedin
19:35	Try: Hayden Pedersen; Ben Hurst; Grant Webb; Anton Oliver; Con: Tony Brown (3); Pen: Tony Brown (3)		Try: Graig Davidson (2); Brent Russell; Trevor Halstead; Butch James; Con: Butch James (4); Pen: Butch James	Referee: George Ayoub (Australia)

13 March 2004	Wellington Hurricanes (New Zealand)	42–25	(South Africa) Golden Cats	Westpac Stadium, Wellington
19:35	Try: Brent Ward; Ma'a Nonu; Tane Tuipulotu; Paul Tito; Roy Kinikinilau; Con: David Holwell (4); Pen: David Holwell (3)		Try: André Pretorius; Os du Randt; Gerhard Vosloo; Con: André Pretorius (2); Pen: André Pretorius (2)	Attendance: 21,722; Referee: Matt Goddard (Australia)

13 March 2004	Queensland Reds (Australia)	20–3	(New Zealand) Auckland Blues	Ballymore Stadium, Brisbane
19:00	Try: Chris Latham (2); Wendell Sailor; Con: Steve Kefu; Pen: Todd Feather		Pen: Ben Atiga	Attendance: 19,670; Referee: Jonathan Kaplan (South Africa)

13 March 2004	Northern Bulls (South Africa)	32–21	(Australia) ACT Brumbies	Loftus Versfeld, Pretoria
16:05	Try: Piet Krause (2); Fourie du Preez; Wessel Roux; Con: Derick Hougaard (3); Pen: Derick Hougaard (2)		Try: Stirling Mortlock; Matt Giteau; Jeremy Paul; Con: Joe Roff (3)	Referee: Paddy O'Brien (New Zealand)

13 March 2004	Stormers (South Africa)	27–23	(Australia) NSW Waratahs	Newlands Stadium, Cape Town
18:10	Try: Breyton Paulse (2); David Britz; Chris Rossouw; Con: Chris Rossouw (2); Pen: Chris Rossouw		Try: Cameron Shepherd; Lote Tuqiri; Morgan Turinui; Con: Matt Burke; Pen: Matt Burke; Tim Donnelly	Referee: Steve Walsh (New Zealand)

=== Round 5 ===
19 March 2004	Wellington Hurricanes (New Zealand)	20–21	(South Africa) Coastal Sharks	Yarrow Stadium, New Plymouth
19:35	Try: Shannon Paku; Ben Herring; Con: David Holwell (2); Pen: David Holwell (2)		Try: Brent Russell; Trevor Halstead; Con: Butch James; Pen: Butch James (3)	Attendance: 13,500; Referee: Stuart Dickinson (Australia)

19 March 2004	Northern Bulls (South Africa)	38–27	(Australia) NSW Waratahs	Loftus Versfeld, Pretoria
19:10	Try: Eddie Fredericks; Odwa Ndungane; Danie Rossouw; Christo Bezuidenhout; Con: Derick Hougaard (3); Pen: Derick Hougaard (4)		Try: Morgan Turinui; Lote Tuqiri; Ben Jacobs; Con: Tim Donnelly (2); Mat Rogers; Pen: Tim Donnelly. Mat Rogers	Referee: Paul Honiss (New Zealand)

20 March 2004	Otago Highlanders (New Zealand)	29–17	(South Africa) Golden Cats	Carisbrook, Dunedin
17:30	Try: Seilala Mapusua; Nick Evans; Craig Newby; Anton Oliver; Con: Nick Evans (3); Pen: Nick Evans		Try: Jaque Fourie; Ricky Januarie; Con: André Pretorius (2); Pen: André Pretorius	Referee: Matt Goddard (Australia)

20 March 2004	Waikato Chiefs (New Zealand)	15–36	(New Zealand) Canterbury Crusaders	Waikato Stadium, Hamilton
19:35	Try: Loki Crichton; Lome Fa'atau; Con: David Hill; Pen: David Hill		Try: Aaron Mauger (2); Caleb Ralph; Mose Tuiali'i; Con: Dan Carter (2); Pen: Dan Carter (4)	Referee: Lyndon Bray (New Zealand)

20 March 2004	Stormers (South Africa)	15–33	(Australia) ACT Brumbies	Newlands Stadium, Cape Town
16:05	Try: Gaffie du Toit; Marius Joubert; Tonderai Chavhanga		Try: Joe Roff; Clyde Rathbone; George Smith; Mark Chisholm; Con: Joe Roff (2); Pen: Joe Roff (3)	Referee: Steve Walsh (New Zealand)

=== Round 6 ===
26 March 2004	Wellington Hurricanes (New Zealand)	26–26	(New Zealand) Auckland Blues	Westpac Stadium, Wellington
19:35	Try: Tane Tuipulotu; Roy Kinikinilau; Con: David Holwell; Piri Weepu; Pen: David Holwell (4)		Try: Rupeni Caucaunibuca; Xavier Rush; Brad Mika; Con: Ben Atiga; Pen: Ben Atiga (3)	Attendance: 31,000; Referee: Paddy O'Brien (New Zealand)

27 March 2004	Waikato Chiefs (New Zealand)	32–17	(Australia) NSW Waratahs	Waikato Stadium, Hamilton
17:30	Try: Keith Lowen; Deacon Manu; Con: David Hill (2); Pen: David Hill (5); Drop: Loki Crichton		Try: Morgan Turinui; Nathan Grey; Con: Shaun Berne (2); Pen: Tim Donnelly	Attendance: 11,500; Referee: Andy Turner (Australia)

27 March 2004	Canterbury Crusaders (New Zealand)	46–29	(New Zealand) Otago Highlanders	Jade Stadium, Christchurch
19:35	Try: Marika Vunibaka (3); Ben Blair; Aaron Mauger; Brad Thorn; Con: Dan Carter (5); Pen: Dan Carter (2)		Try: Nick Evans; Iliesa Tanivula; Craig Newby; Sam Harding; Con: Nick Evans (2); Tony Brown; Pen: Tony Brown	Attendance: 35,000; Referee: Lyndon Bray (New Zealand)

27 March 2004	Stormers (South Africa)	25–11	(South Africa) Northern Bulls	Newlands Stadium, Cape Town
15:05	Try: Breyton Paulse; Marius Joubert; Corné Krige; Con: Gaffie du Toit (2); Pen: Gaffie du Toit (2)		Try: Piet Krause; Pen: Derick Hougaard; Drop: Derick Hougaard	Attendance: 47,500; Referee: Michael Katzenellenbogen (South Africa)

28 March 2004	ACT Brumbies (Australia)	51–8	(Australia) Queensland Reds	Canberra Stadium, Canberra
16:30	Try: Clyde Rathbone (2); Joe Roff; Stirling Mortlock; Scott Fava; Mark Gerrard; Mark Bartholomeusz; Con: Joe Roff (5); Pen: Joe Roff (2)		Try: Drew Mitchell; Pen: Tim Walsh	Attendance: 24,017; Referee: Stuart Dickinson (Australia)

=== Round 7 ===
2 April 2004	Otago Highlanders (New Zealand)	31–36	(New Zealand) Waikato Chiefs	Carisbrook, Dunedin
19:35	Try: Seilala Mapusua (2); Hayden Pedersen; Josh Blackie; Con: Tony Brown (4); Pen: Tony Brown		Try: Lome Fa'atau; Derek Maisey; Sitiveni Sivivatu; Marty Holah; Penalty try Con: David Hill (4); Pen: David Hill	Attendance: 13,000; Referee: Lyndon Bray (New Zealand)

3 April 2004	Canterbury Crusaders (New Zealand)	47–28	(Australia) ACT Brumbies	Jade Stadium, Christchurch
17:30	Try: Richie McCaw (2); Cameron McIntyre; Ben Blair; Caleb Ralph; Con: Dan Carter (4); Cameron McIntyre; Pen: Dan Carter (4)		Try: Clyde Rathbone (2); Matt Giteau; Mark Gerrard; Con: Joe Roff (4)	Attendance: 32,000; Referee: André Watson (South Africa)

3 April 2004	Wellington Hurricanes (New Zealand)	29–12	(Australia) Queensland Reds	Westpac Stadium, Wellington
19:35	Try: Brent Ward; Roy Kinikinilau; Jerry Collins; Andrew Hore; Con: David Holwell (3); Pen: David Holwell		Try: John Roe; Junior Pelesasa; Con: Tim Walsh	Attendance: 21,800; Referee: Andy Turner (Australia)

3 April 2004	Coastal Sharks (South Africa)	42–28	(South Africa) Golden Cats	Kings Park Stadium, Durban
17:05	Try: Henno Mentz (2); Brent Russell; Adrian Jacobs; AJ Venter; Con: Butch James (4); Pen: Butch James (3)		Try: Juan Smith (2); Wayne Julies; Wikus van Heerden; Con: André Pretorius; Pen: André Pretorius (2)	Attendance: 35,000; Referee: Shaun Veldsman (South Africa)

4 April 2004	Auckland Blues (New Zealand)	22–17	(Australia) NSW Waratahs	Eden Park, Auckland
14:35	Try: Joe Rokocoko (2); Ben Atiga; Con: Carlos Spencer (2); Pen: Carlos Spencer		Try: Matt Burke; Adam Freier; Con: Matt Burke (2); Pen: Matt Burke	Attendance: 24,000; Referee: Jonathan Kaplan (South Africa)

=== Round 8 ===
9 April 2004	Auckland Blues (New Zealand)	56–19	(South Africa) Northern Bulls	North Harbour Stadium, Albany
19:35	Try: Sam Tuitupou (2); Joe Rokocoko (2); David Gibson; Ben Atiga; Carlos Spencer; Ali Williams; Derren Witcombe; Con: Carlos Spencer (4); Pen: Carlos Spencer		Try: Ettienne Botha; Jacques Cronjé; Victor Matfield; Con: Derick Hougaard (2)	Attendance: 18,500; Referee: Scott Young (Australia)

9 April 2004	ACT Brumbies (Australia)	50–18	(New Zealand) Otago Highlanders	Canberra Stadium, Canberra
19:40	Try: Jeremy Paul (2); Joe Roff; Stirling Mortlock; Stephen Larkham; Scott Fava; Mark Chisholm; Con: Joe Roff (6); Pen: Joe Roff		Try: Nick Evans; Anton Oliver; Con: Tony Brown; Pen: Tony Brown (2)	Attendance: 23,104; Referee: Mark Lawrence (South Africa)

10 April 2004	Queensland Reds (Australia)	20–21	(South Africa) Stormers	Ballymore Stadium, Brisbane
19:40	Try: Wendell Sailor; Drew Mitchell; Peter Hynes; Con: Tim Walsh; Pen: Tim Walsh		Try: Marius Joubert; Quinton Davids; Con: Chris Rossouw; Pen: Chris Rossouw (3)	Attendance: 12,238; Referee: Kelvin Deaker (New Zealand)

10 April 2004	Coastal Sharks (South Africa)	29–25	(New Zealand) Canterbury Crusaders	Kings Park Stadium, Durban
15:05	Try: Brent Russell; Henno Mentz; Adi Jacobs; Ricardo Loubscher; Con: Butch James (3); Pen: Butch James		Try: Richie McCaw; Caleb Ralph; Marika Vunibaka; Con: Andrew Mehrtens (2); Pen: Andrew Mehrtens (2)	Attendance: 37,526; Referee: Matt Goddard (Australia)

10 April 2004	Golden Cats (South Africa)	23–21	(New Zealand) Waikato Chiefs	Ellis Park, Johannesburg
17:05	Try: Jaque Fourie; Jorrie Muller; Con: André Pretorius (2); Pen: André Pretorius (3)		Try: Lome Fa'atau; Sione Lauaki; Con: David Hill; Pen: David Hill (3)	Referee: George Ayoub (Australia)

=== Round 9 ===
16 April 2004	Auckland Blues (New Zealand)	23–51	(South Africa) Stormers	Eden Park, Auckland
19:35	Try: Doug Howlett; Rico Gear; Orene Ai'i; Con: Ben Atiga; Pen: Ben Atiga; Carlos Spencer		Try: Tonderai Chavhanga (2); Adri Badenhorst (2); Werner Greeff; Marius Joubert; Neil de Kock; Daan Human; Con: Gaffie du Toit (4); Drop: Gaffie du Toit	Attendance: 29,827; Referee: Andrew Cole (Australia)

16 April 2004	Queensland Reds (Australia)	17–23	(South Africa) Northern Bulls	Ballymore Stadium, Brisbane
19:40	Try: Wendell Sailor; Steve Kefu; Peter Hynes; Con: Nathan Williams		Try: Eddie Fredericks; Gary Botha; Con: Derick Hougaard (2); Pen: Derick Hougaard (3)	Attendance: 11,683; Referee: Paddy O'Brien (New Zealand)

16 April 2004	Coastal Sharks (South Africa)	27–34	(New Zealand) Waikato Chiefs	Kings Park Stadium, Durban
19:10	Try: Brent Russell; Henno Mentz; John Smit; Con: Butch James (3); Pen: Butch James (2)		Try: Loki Crichton; Lome Fa'atau; Keith Lowen; Sione Lauaki; Con: Glen Jackson (4); Pen: Glen Jackson (2)	Attendance: 35,347; Referee: George Ayoub (Australia)

17 April 2004	NSW Waratahs (Australia)	49–31	(New Zealand) Wellington Hurricanes	Sydney Football Stadium, Sydney
19:40	Try: Cameron Shepherd; Lote Tuqiri; Shaun Berne; David Lyons; Chris Whitaker; Matt Dunning; Adam Freier; Con: Matt Burke (4); Pen: Matt Burke (2)		Try: Brent Ward; Rodney So'oialo; Roy Kinikinilau; Tana Umaga; Con: David Holwell (3); Piri Weepu; Pen: David Holwell	Attendance: 38,671; Referee: Tappe Henning (South Africa)

17 April 2004	Golden Cats (South Africa)	37–39	(New Zealand) Canterbury Crusaders	Ellis Park, Johannesburg
15:05	Try: Boela du Plooy; CJ van der Linde; Juan Smith; Gurthrö Steenkamp; Con: André Pretorius (3); Coenraad Johannes Fourie; Pen: Coenraad Johannes Fourie (2); Drop: André Pretorius		Try: Dan Carter (2); Marika Vunibaka; Scott Hamilton; Cameron McIntyre; Con: Dan Carter (4); Pen: Dan Carter (2)	Attendance: 12,111; Referee: Matt Goddard (Australia)

=== Round 10 ===
23 April 2004	Waikato Chiefs (New Zealand)	29–14	(South Africa) Stormers	Waikato Stadium, Hamilton
19:35	Try: Sitiveni Sivivatu (2); Byron Kelleher; Derek Maisey; Con: Glen Jackson (3); Pen: Glen Jackson		Try: Marius Joubert; Hendrik Gerber; Con: Chris Rossouw; Gaffie du Toit	Attendance: 17,454; Referee: Stuart Dickinson (Australia)

24 April 2004	Canterbury Crusaders (New Zealand)	40–21	(South Africa) Northern Bulls	Jade Stadium, Christchurch
17:30	Try: Marika Vunibaka (2); Greg Somerville (2); Con: Dan Carter (4); Pen: Dan Carter (4)		Try: Fourie du Preez; Anton Leonard; Willem de Waal; Pen: Derick Hougaard; Willem de Waal	Attendance: 25,000; Referee: George Ayoub (Australia)

24 April 2004	Otago Highlanders (New Zealand)	26–14	(New Zealand) Wellington Hurricanes	Carisbrook, Dunedin
19:35	Try: Matt Saunders; Jimmy Cowan; Con: Tony Brown (2); Pen: Tony Brown (4)		Try: Kristian Ormsby; Pen: David Holwell (3)	Attendance: 17,500; Referee: Paul Honiss (New Zealand)

24 April 2004	NSW Waratahs (Australia)	37–29	(Australia) ACT Brumbies	Sydney Football Stadium, Sydney
19:40	Try: Lote Tuqiri (2); Cameron Shepherd; Con: Matt Burke (2); Pen: Matt Burke (6)		Try: Joe Roff; Clyde Rathbone; Stirling Mortlock; Scott Fava; Con: Joe Roff (3); Pen: Joe Roff	Attendance: 37,832; Referee: Andrew Cole (Australia)

24 April 2004	Coastal Sharks (South Africa)	5–6	(Australia) Queensland Reds	Kings Park Stadium, Durban
15:05	Try: BJ Botha		Pen: Elton Flatley (2)	Attendance: 35,000; Referee: Kelvin Deaker (New Zealand)

24 April 2004	Golden Cats (South Africa)	28–35	(New Zealand) Auckland Blues	Ellis Park, Johannesburg
17:05	Try: Gerrie Britz; Anton Pitout; Jorrie Muller; Con: André Pretorius (2); Pen: André Pretorius (3)		Try: Doug Howlett (2); Sam Tuitupou; Angus Macdonald; Con: Luke McAlister (3); Pen: Luke McAlister (3)	Attendance: 13,454; Referee: Scott Young (Australia)

=== Round 11 ===
30 April 2004	Waikato Chiefs (New Zealand)	24–22	(South Africa) Northern Bulls	Waikato Stadium, Hamilton
19:35	Try: Michael Collins; Jono Gibbes; Con: Glen Jackson; Pen: Glen Jackson (3); David Hill		Try: Gary Botha; Ayanda Sam Willard; Ettienne Botha; Con: Willem de Waal (2); Pen: Derick Hougaard	Referee: Stuart Dickinson (Australia)

30 April 2004	Coastal Sharks (South Africa)	26–37	(New Zealand) Auckland Blues	Kings Park Stadium, Durban
19:10	Try: Brent Russell; Butch James; Con: Butch James (2); Pen: Butch James (4)		Try: Billy Fulton; Mils Muliaina; Sam Tuitupou; Derren Witcombe; Con: Carlos Spencer (4); Pen: Carlos Spencer (3)	Referee: Scott Young (Australia)

1 May 2004	NSW Waratahs (Australia)	28–29	(New Zealand) Otago Highlanders	Sydney Football Stadium, Sydney
15:05	Try: Matt Burke; Morgan Turinui; Simon Kasprowicz; Con: Matt Burke (2); Pen: Matt Burke; Shaun Berne (2)		Try: Matt Saunders (2); Sam Harding; Anton Oliver; Con: Tony Brown (3); Pen: Tony Brown	Attendance: 35,959; Referee: Shaun Veldsman (South Africa)

1 May 2004	Canterbury Crusaders (New Zealand)	24–9	(South Africa) Stormers	Jade Stadium, Christchurch
19:35	Try: Dan Carter; Caleb Ralph; Con: Dan Carter; Pen: Dan Carter (4)		Pen: Chris Rossouw (3)	Referee: Andrew Cole (Australia)

1 May 2004	ACT Brumbies (Australia)	46–25	(New Zealand) Wellington Hurricanes	Canberra Stadium, Canberra
19:40	Try: Stirling Mortlock (2); Clyde Rathbone; Mark Gerrard; Stephen Larkham; Mark Chisholm; Jeremy Paul; Con: Joe Roff (4); Pen: Joe Roff		Try: Brent Ward; Hosea Gear; Roy Kinikinilau; Con: David Holwell (2); Pen: David Holwell (2)	Attendance: 21,474; Referee: André Watson (South Africa)

1 May 2004	Golden Cats (South Africa)	23–47	(Australia) Queensland Reds	Free State Stadium, Bloemfontein
15:05	Try: Jaque Fourie; Ricky Januarie; Con: André Pretorius; Coenraad Johannes Fourie; Pen: André Pretorius (3)		Try: John Roe (2); Chris Latham; Josh Valentine; David Croft; Sean Hardman; Con: Elton Flatley (4); Pen: Elton Flatley (3)	Referee: Steve Walsh (New Zealand)

=== Round 12 ===
7 May 2004	Wellington Hurricanes (New Zealand)	37–20	(New Zealand) Canterbury Crusaders	Westpac Stadium, Wellington
19:35	Try: Brent Ward (2); Andrew Hore (2); Tana Umaga; Con: David Holwell (3); Pen: David Holwell (2)		Try: Dan Carter; Dave Hewett; Jamie Nutbrown; Con: Andrew Mehrtens; Pen: Dan Carter	Attendance: 34,500; Referee: Paddy O'Brien (New Zealand)

8 May 2004	Waikato Chiefs (New Zealand)	12–15	(Australia) ACT Brumbies	Waikato Stadium, Hamilton
17:30	Pen: Glen Jackson (3); David Hill		Try: Joe Roff; Matt Giteau; Con: Joe Roff; Pen: Joe Roff	Referee: Tappe Henning (South Africa)

8 May 2004	Auckland Blues (New Zealand)	50–22	(New Zealand) Otago Highlanders	Eden Park, Auckland
19:35	Try: Doug Howlett (2); Kees Meeuws (2); Rico Gear; Justin Collins; Mils Muliaina; Con: Carlos Spencer (4); Ben Atiga (2); Pen: Carlos Spencer		Try: Neil Brew; Glen Horton; Matt Saunders; Con: Tony Brown (2); Pen: Tony Brown	Referee: Paul Honiss (New Zealand)

8 May 2004	Queensland Reds (Australia)	23–7	(Australia) NSW Waratahs	Suncorp Stadium, Brisbane
19:40	Try: Peter Hynes; Nathan Sharpe; Con: Elton Flatley (2); Pen: Elton Flatley (3)		Try: Lote Tuqiri; Con: Matt Burke	Attendance: 42,237; Referee: Andrew Cole (Australia)

8 May 2004	Northern Bulls (South Africa)	62–52	(South Africa) Golden Cats	Loftus Versfeld, Pretoria
15:05	Try: Fourie du Preez (3); Odwa Ndungane (2); Pedrie Wannenburg; Frikkie Welsh; Eddie Fredericks; Victor Matfield; Con: Willem de Waal (7); Pen: Willem de Waal		Try: Gerrie Britz (3); Jorrie Muller (2); Juan Smith; Os du Randt; Con: Coenraad Johannes Fourie (7); Pen: Coenraad Johannes Fourie	Referee: Jonathan Kaplan (South Africa)

8 May 2004	Coastal Sharks (South Africa)	24–31	(South Africa) Stormers	Kings Park Stadium, Durban
17:05	Try: Adi Jacobs; Henno Mentz; Trevor Halstead; John Smit; Con: Noel Oelschig; Brent Russell		Try: Schalk Burger (2); Pieter Dixon; Tonderai Chavhanga; Werner Greeff; Con: Gaffie du Toit (3)	Referee: Mark Lawrence (South Africa)

== Finals ==
=== Semi finals ===
15 May 2004
19:35

Canterbury Crusaders (New Zealand)	27–16	(South Africa) Stormers
Try: Justin Marshall; Caleb Ralph; Con: Dan Carter; Pen: Dan Carter (5)		Try: De Wet Barry; Con: Gaffie du Toit; Pen: Gaffie du Toit (3)

Jade Stadium, Christchurch
Attendance: 25,000
Referee: Andrew Cole (Australia)

15 May 2004
19:40

ACT Brumbies (Australia)	32–17	(New Zealand) Waikato Chiefs
Try: Stirling Mortlock; Mark Gerrard; Mark Chisholm; Radike Samo; Clyde Rathbone; Con: Joe Roff (2); Pen: Joe Roff		Try: Steven Bates; Lome Fa'atau; Con: Glen Jackson (2); Pen: Glen Jackson

Canberra Stadium, Canberra
Attendance: 23,191
Referee: Jonathan Kaplan (South Africa)

=== Grand final ===
22 May 2004
19:40

ACT Brumbies (Australia)	47–38	(New Zealand) Canterbury Crusaders
Try: Mark Gerrard (3); Joe Roff (2); Matt Giteau; Jeremy Paul; Con: Joe Roff (6)		Try: Richie McCaw; Aaron Mauger; Brad Thorn; Chris King; Casey Laulala; Dan Carter; Con: Dan Carter (4)

Canberra Stadium, Canberra
Attendance: 28,753
Referee: André Watson (South Africa)

Brumbies	Crusaders

15	Joe Roff
14	Clyde Rathbone
13	Joel Wilson
12	Matt Giteau
11	Mark Gerrard
10	Stephen Larkham
9	George Gregan
8	Scott Fava
7	George Smith
6	Owen Finegan (c)
5	Radike Samo
4	Mark Chisholm
3	Nic Henderson
2	Jeremy Paul
1	Bill Young
Substitutes:
16	David Palavi
17	Guy Shepherdson
18	David Giffin
19	Jone Tawake
20	Matt Henjak
21	Mark Bartholomeusz
22	Lenny Beckett
Coach:
(Australia) David Nucifora

15	Ben Blair
14	Marika Vunibaka
13	Aaron Mauger
12	Dan Carter
11	Caleb Ralph
10	Cameron McIntyre
9	Justin Marshall
8	Sam Broomhall
7	Richie McCaw
6	Reuben Thorne (c)
5	Chris Jack
4	Brad Thorn
3	Greg Somerville
2	Tone Kopelani
1	David Hewett
Substitutions:
16	Corey Flynn
17	Chris King
18	Ross Filipo
19	Johnny Leo'o
20	Jamie Nutbrown
21	Andrew Mehrtens
22	Casey Laulala
Coach:
(New Zealand) Robbie Deans
