= Shane Carter =

Shane Carter may refer to:

- Shane Carter (musician) with Hall & Oates
- Shane Carter (rugby union) (born 1974), New Zealand rugby player
- Shayne Carter, New Zealand musician
