= Clint Brown =

Clint Brown may refer to:

- Clint Brown (broadcaster), New Zealand television sports presenter
- Clint Brown (musician) (born 1963), American gospel musician
- Clint Brown (baseball) (1903–1955), American baseball player
