= Chris Siale =

- Born: Chris Siale; 31 July 1983 (age 43) Auckland, New Zealand
- Height: 178 cm (5 ft 10 in)
- Weight: 96 kg (15 st 2 lb; 212 lb)
- School: St Patrick's College, Strathfield

Rugby union career
- Position: Centre
Senior career
Years	Team	Apps	(Points)
2008–2015	Tarbes	108	(40)
Provincial / State sides
Years	Team	Apps	(Points)
2007	Western Sydney Rams	5	(15)
2008	University of Queensland	10	(8)
Super Rugby
Years	Team	Apps	(Points)
2006–2007	Waratahs	3	(0)
2008	Reds	3	(0)
International career
Years	Team	Apps	(Points)
2003–2004	Australia U21		

Chris Siale (born 31 July 1983) is a New Zealand born Australian Rugby Union player who plays either center position or wing for Tarbes in the French Pro D2. Siale previously played for the Queensland Reds in the southern hemisphere's Super 14 competition and for the New South Wales Waratahs and the Western Sydney Rams in the now defunct Australian Rugby Championship.

== Career ==
=== School Boys Rugby ===
Siale attended St Patrick's College (Strathfield), playing in the 1st XV under the back-to-back championship success of Head coach Joe Barakat. In 1999, Siale was selected in the championship winning NSW Schools 1st XV.

=== NSW Club Rugby ===
Siale followed long term coach and mentor Joe Barakat to West Harbour RUFC where he continued to grow.

=== Australian U/21s ===
Siale joined the Australia U21 squad in 2003, one of several players to be recalled in 2004.

=== Super Rugby ===
Siale debuted for the Waratahs on the 2004 development tour of Argentina. Siale continued to play up until 2007 where he made 10 appearances, until he signed with the Reds for the 2008 Super 14 season along with fellow New South Wales Waratahs player Morgan Turinui.

Chris came of age in the ARC where his excellent footwork and line breaking ability combined with his strong defence earned him a way into the depleted Queensland midfield along with 2007 Waratahs teammate and Wallaby World Cup member Morgan Turinui. He was also unlucky to be called up to the Wallabies squad for the 2007 World Cup held in France, due to an ankle injury he had suffered during the ARC tournament. The duo prove to be a strong center combination for previously midfield lacking Reds.
