= David Palavi =

Australian rugby player

- Born: 19 March 1979 (age 47)
- Height: 176 cm (5 ft 9 in)
- Weight: 101 kg (223 lb)
- School: St Kevin's College; Erindale College

Rugby union career
- Position: Flanker / Hooker
Super Rugby
Years	Team	Apps	(Points)
2004–06	Brumbies	22	(0)

David Palavi (born 19 March 1979) is an Australian former professional rugby union player.

Born to Tongan parents, Palavi attended St Kevin's College in Melbourne and played in their first XV at age 15, before taking up a scholarship to finish his schooling at Canberra's Erindale College.

In 1998, Palavi was the only Victorian member of the inaugural Melbourne Storm squad. He would spend the entire season playing junior rugby league with the Storm's Queensland Cup affiliate team Norths Devils, appearing in the under age grand final for the Devils against Brisbane Brothers, won by the Devils 44–20.

An openside flanker and hooker, Palavi played 22 matches with the ACT Brumbies in Super 12, including the 2004 final win over the Crusaders. He played in the Canberra Vikings team which won three successive Queensland Premier Rugby titles and in 2005 served as club captain. A neck injury caused him to retire in 2007.

Palavi received a nine-month suspended sentence in 2007 for two separate instances of assault, including an assault on police. He was also ordered to undergo alcohol counselling by the ACT Magistrates Court.
