= Ali Williams =

New Zealand rugby union player (born 1981)

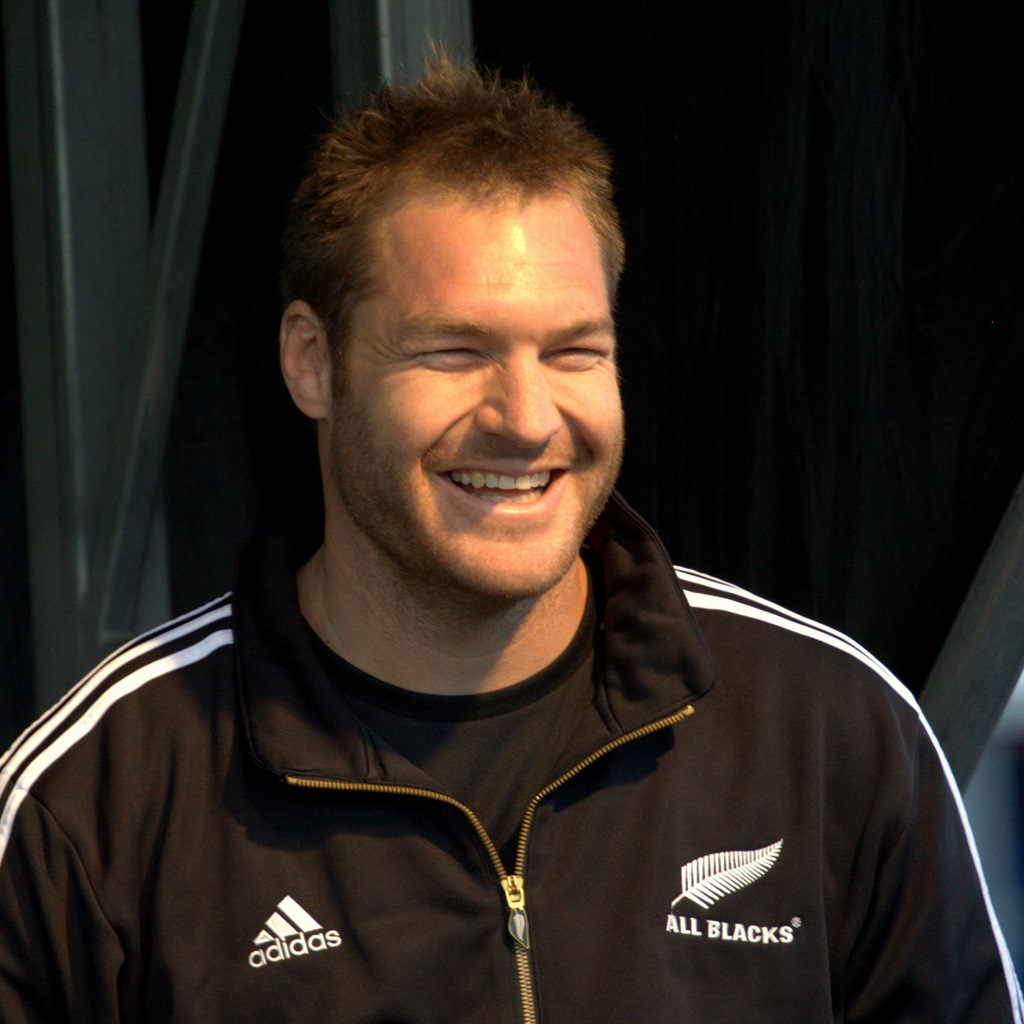
- Williams representing New Zealand during the Rugby World Cup
- Full name: Alexander James Williams
- Born: 30 April 1981 (age 45) Auckland, New Zealand
- Height: 2.03 m (6 ft 8 in)
- Weight: 118 kg (260 lb; 18 st 8 lb)
- School: King's College
- University: Auckland University of Technology
- Notable relative: Jay Williams (brother)

Rugby union career
- Position: Lock
Senior career
Years	Team	Apps	(Points)
2001–2012	Auckland	34	(20)
2002–2007	Blues	52	(5)
2008	Crusaders	15	(15)
2009–2013	Blues	50	(5)
2010–2011	→ Nottingham (loan)	3	(0)
2013–2015	Toulon	42	(15)
2016–2017	Racing 92	10	(0)
- Correct as of 12 November 2023
International career
Years	Team	Apps	(Points)
2002–2012	New Zealand	77	(35)
- Correct as of 12 November 2023

Alexander James Williams (born 30 April 1981) is a retired New Zealand professional rugby union player who played as a lock most notably for Super Rugby club Blues and the New Zealand national team.

Williams spent almost all of his playing career in his homeland. At provincial level, he played mainly with Auckland, though he spent one season with Tasman and was also loaned out to Nottingham in England's second-level RFU Championship in 2010. At Super Rugby level, he played for both the Blues and Crusaders. Williams played for New Zealand's national team, the All Blacks, between 2002 and 2012. He was in the All Blacks' squad for the 2003, 2007 and 2011 World Cups.

In 2005, NZ Rugby Almanack chose him as one of its five players of the year. Williams spent what were to have been the final two seasons of his career in France with Toulon, playing there from 2013 to 2015. He came out of retirement to play in the 2016/17 season for top French club Racing 92. On 25 February 2017 Williams was arrested in Paris for allegedly buying cocaine.

== Early life ==
Williams did not begin playing rugby until 1998 when, aged 17 during his time in Greenbank house at King's college. He played for the King's College Second XV. He had already represented Auckland at junior level in soccer, tennis and cricket. In 1999, he was a member of the King's College First XV and at this stage he decided to concentrate on rugby. Williams attributed much of his early success to 1st XV coach Mark Kennelly. He began a business studies course at Auckland University of Technology, but after playing club rugby and spending time at the Auckland Rugby Academy, he was selected to make his first class debut for Auckland in a National Provincial Championship (NPC) match against Taranaki on 24 August 2001. The following year he was named in the Blues squad for the Super 12 and made his debut against the Hurricanes in the opening game of the season, on 22 February 2002. Later that year, he was selected for the All Blacks' year-end tour to England, France and Wales; he played in all three Test matches, making his international debut against England at Twickenham on 9 November 2002.

== Club career ==
=== Blues ===
In 2007, Williams was one of the 22 players withdrawn from the first half of the Super 14 season to attend a "conditioning camp", as part of the All Blacks' World Cup preparations. Although he became available for the Blues in week 8 of the tournament, he was left out of the squad that week, was on the bench in week 9, and did not make his first start of the season until week 10, when the Blues played the Cheetahs. A week later he was back on the bench for the Blues game against the Sharks . A few weeks later, "for disciplinary reasons", Williams was left out of the squad to face the Sharks in Durban in a S14 semi-final match – which the Blues lost – and returned home to Auckland. Blues chief executive Andy Dalton told the press that management and senior players had made a joint decision to eject Williams from the team camp over incidents which occurred during the team's stay in Perth, Australia, where they had played the Western Force. "On several occasions (Williams's) behaviour has been deemed inappropriate within team conduct and protocol and on at least four occasions Williams has been addressed by either coach David Nucifora and manager Ant Strachan or the leadership group on behalf of the team", Dalton said. In response, Williams said that he took "a bit of responsibility" for his actions but that "it takes two to tango".

The disciplinary issue was later linked to a dispute between Williams and his coach about his lack of game time in the Super 14 and it was reported that Williams was one of three players who were demanding a release from their contracts if coach Nucifora was re-appointed for 2008 (as he later was). The report was denied by Auckland management and in any case Williams's contract with the Blues was due to terminate at the end of 2007. With the temporary absence of Blues Captain Keven Mealamu, Williams was appointed captain of the Blues for 2013.

=== Tasman ===
In August 2007, Ali Williams announced that he had signed a new contract with the NZRU that would keep him in New Zealand until the end of 2009 and that he was signing for the Tasman Makos for 2008, so as to be eligible for selection for the Crusaders in the 2008 Super 14 season. Salary cap restrictions prevented a move to Canterbury, but his contract with Tasman has an option that would allow him to be loaned to Canterbury for the 2008 ANZ Cup. Williams was duly included in the Crusaders squad when New Zealand's 2008 Super 14 teams were announced, in October 2007.

=== Toulon ===
In July 2013 was announced that Ali Williams signed a one-year contract with the European champion Toulon

== International career ==
=== 2003 ===
Following the 2002 year-end tour to Europe, Williams became a regular member of the All Blacks. He started in all three matches against touring Northern Hemisphere teams, in June 2003, though he could have missed the games against Wales and France, after being cited for stamping on the head of England fullback Josh Lewsey; he was cleared of the charge when a disciplinary tribunal ruled that his actions had been "inadvertent and incidental". He started in all four matches in the 2003 Tri Nations Series, before being chosen in the All Blacks squad for the 2003 Rugby World Cup. He almost did not make the squad, after suffering a stress fracture of the right foot during the All Blacks training camp in New Plymouth, an injury that required the insertion of a pin, but was included on the strength of his line-out play. He was rested for the first two pool matches, against Italy and Canada, but started in the remaining five games that New Zealand played, scoring his first international try in the final pool game, against Wales, when he jumped above the Welsh wing Shane Williams, to collect a cross-field kick from Carlos Spencer. French back, and newspaper columnist, Thomas Castaignède named Williams and England's winning captain, Martin Johnson as the locks in his "team of the tournament".

=== 2004 ===
At the start of the 2004 season, Williams failed to impress new All Blacks coach Graham Henry. Struggling to recover from the foot injury sustained just before the World Cup, he was below his best in the Super 12. Also, Henry was looking for locks who could perform well in the tight forward role, whereas the athletic and mobile Williams was viewed as a forward who was happier operating in loose play. For the trial match between "Probables" and "Possibles", he was chosen merely as a replacement for the "Possibles", and he was left out of the squad to face England, Argentina and the Pacific Islanders, and missed the next five Tests, including the opening match of the 2004 Tri Nations against Australia. He was called into the squad before the Pacific Islands match, as cover for the injured Keith Robinson, but was not used, and he was left out of the squad for the Tri Nations. When Robinson had to withdraw from the opening game, it was Simon Maling, not Williams, who was called up to replace him. Williams was recalled to the squad for the next game, against South Africa, in which he came on as a substitute, and started in the return fixture against Australia, a game which the All Blacks lost and in which Williams was sin-binned after New Zealand were adjudged to have infringed repeatedly. After an indifferent performance against Australia – according to coach Graham Henry, "we thought Ali Williams had an opportunity on Saturday and didn't take it" – Williams was dropped from the squad for New Zealand's last game in the 2004 Tri Nations, against South Africa, who won comprehensively, out-scoring the All Blacks by five tries to two.

Williams's selection for the All Black's end-of-year tour to Europe was helped by the unavailability of Keith Robinson, and Simon Maling, who was about to take up a contract in Japan, but he only started in the second Test, against Wales, coming on as a replacement in the other two Tests, against Italy and France. He also started in the end-of-tour match against the Barbarians.

=== 2005 ===
Despite a lack of game time during the 2005 Super 12 season – he was suspended for six weeks after being found guilty of trampling on fellow All Black Richie McCaw during the game between the Blues and Crusaders – Williams was chosen to start in the opening Test of the All Blacks season, a 91–0 rout of Fiji, during which he scored his second international try. His third came two weeks later, in the first Test against the touring British & Irish Lions, a game in which he dominated the line-out, winning the ball several times on the opposition's throw, most effectively in the 24th minute, when, having caught the ball on a Lions' defensive line-out, he spotted a gap in the opposing line, darted through it and, shaking off an attempted tackle by the Lions half-back, Dwayne Peel, drove over the goal-line for the All Blacks' first try of the match. He started in all three Tests against the Lions, and scored his fourth international try in the final Test, when Dwayne Peel fumbled a grubber kick from Luke McAlister, and Williams pounced on the loose ball in the in-goal area. He started in all four of New Zealand's matches in the 2005 Tri Nations Series and came close to scoring another try in the last game, against Australia, on his home ground, Eden Park, but, after winning the ball at an Australian line-out and making a 20-metre break, his attempted grubber kick was wayward. He did, however, create the second of wing Doug Howlett's three tries in the game when, from within the Australian 22, in front of the posts, he executed a fine cross-field kick that Howlett caught on the far right of Australia's in-goal area for an easy touch-down. In 2009 Williams released his biography "Ali: Tall Book of Tales". It was during this time in which he spoke of an incident involving Clint Brown then TV anchor for 3 News who was stripped naked by Williams and members of the All Black team and had his eyebrows shaved off after becoming heavily intoxicated on a flight from South Africa to Australia.

After such a successful season, Williams was an automatic choice for the year-end "Grand Slam" tour of the British Isles. Still nursing a shoulder strain that he sustained during a game of backyard rugby, he was rested for the first game, against Wales, but returned for the game against Ireland a week later, in a starting line-up that included none of those who had started against Wales. He started against England at Twickenham, a game that lived up to expectations as the toughest of the tour, but was omitted from the squad for the final game of the tour, against Scotland, after coach Graham Henry opted to make 13 changes from the team that had faced England.

=== 2006 ===
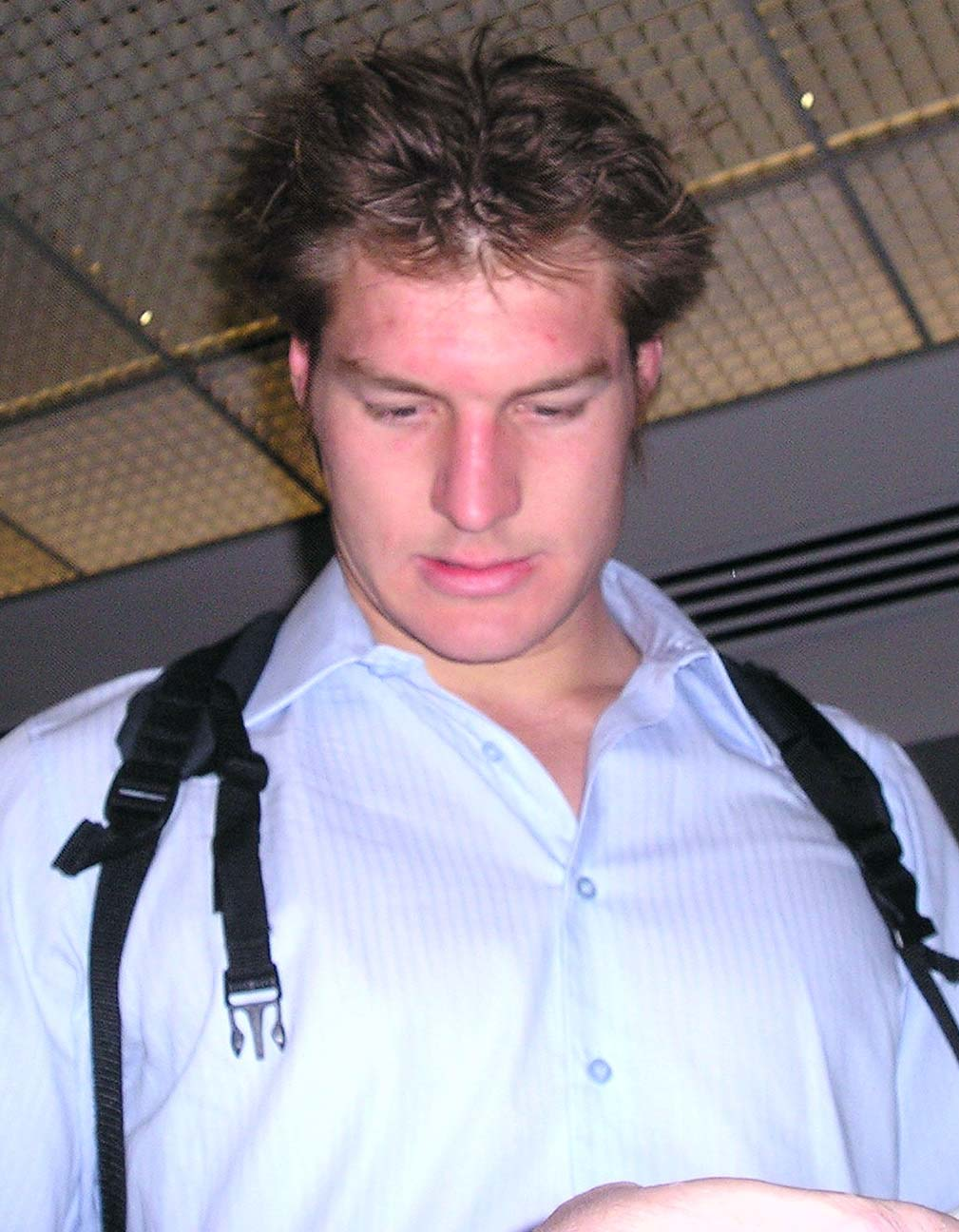
Ali Williams

At the start of the 2006 season, the All Blacks faced an awkward schedule, with two home Tests against Ireland to be followed, a week later, by a Test against Argentina in Buenos Aires. Williams was selected in the squad to face Ireland, but suffered a syndesmosis injury – commonly referred to as a high ankle strain – during a training session. Chris Jack, who had originally been included in the starting line-up for the Argentina game, was brought in to replace him, and Williams took Jack's place for the game in Buenos Aires. Williams was named on the bench for the first match in the 2006 Tri Nations Series, against Australia in Christchurch; he replaced Jason Eaton with 20 minutes remaining and came close to creating a try when he leapt high to retrieve a cross-field kick from Dan Carter, tapping it back to wing Rico Gear, who was unable to hold on to the ball. He started in the next two matches, against South Africa in Wellington and Australia in Brisbane, being replaced late in the latter game by Eaton, who replaced him in the starting line-up for the return match against Australia in Auckland. Williams again came off the bench with less than an hour gone, and then played the full 80 minutes in the All Blacks' remaining two fixtures, both against South Africa away from home.

Williams did not feature in the first game of the All Blacks' year-end tour to Europe, but was one of ten changes to the starting line-up for the second game, against France in Lyon and he started in all three remaining matches, two against France and one against Wales in Cardiff. He was replaced by James Ryan after an hour of the last game, but not before he had demonstrated yet another aspect of his versatility, when he fielded the ball in his own 22 and, with a spiralling kick, cleared it into touch on Wales' 10-metre line, setting up a line-out from which the All Blacks came away with the ball to score their third try of the game.

=== 2007 ===
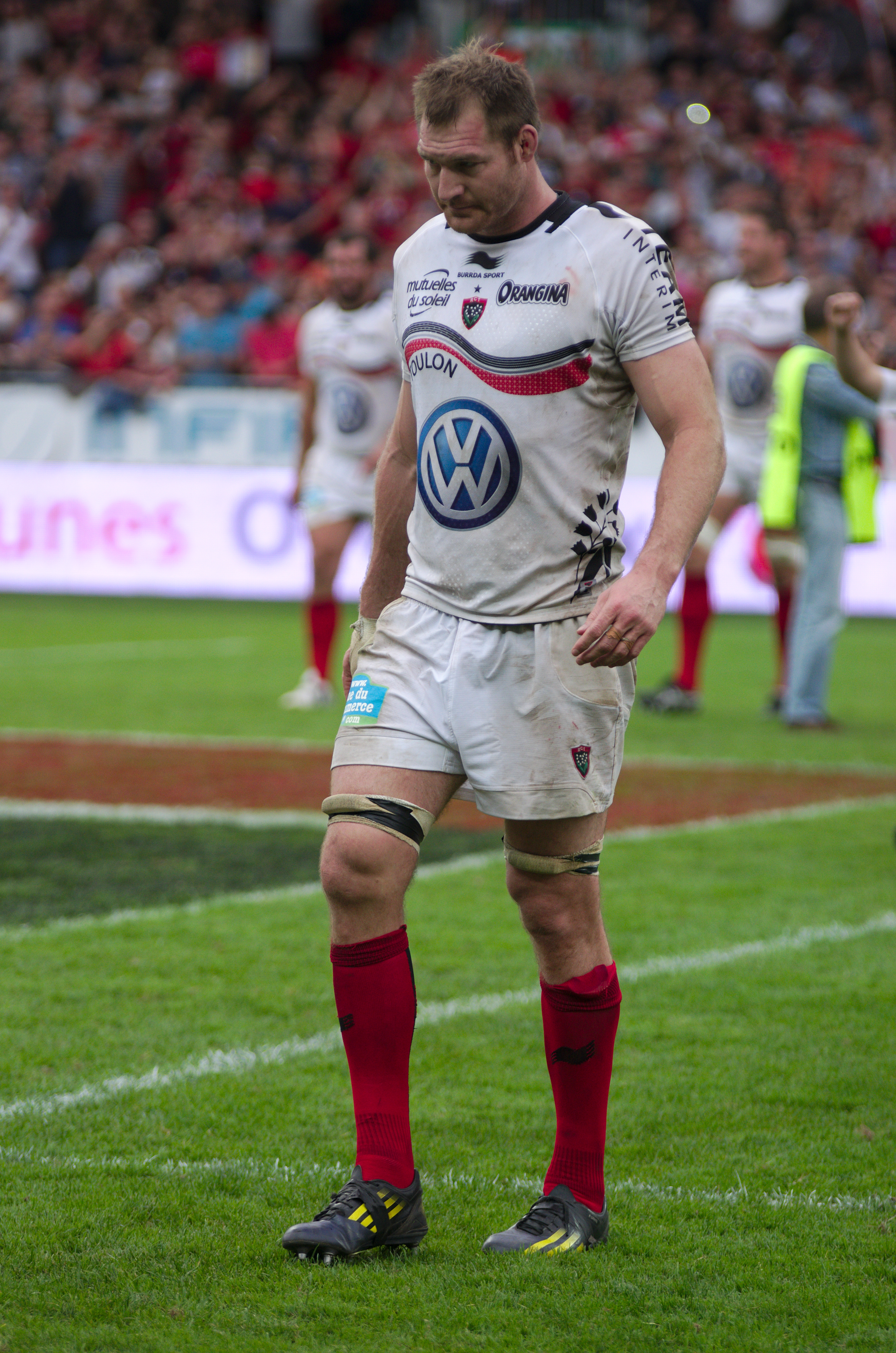

Williams's troubles with the Blues had no impact on his international career, as he was included in the New Zealand squad for the two-Test series against France in June 2007. He started both Tests, but suffered a serious injury in the second Test, on 9 June, when he fractured his jaw while tackling French number eight Sébastien Chabal. As a result, he missed the whole of the 2007 Tri Nations Series. But despite having his jaw wired and being forced to subsist on soup for several weeks, he made a return to rugby for his club side, Ponsonby, at the end of July, scoring two tries, and started for Auckland in their Air New Zealand Cup match against Bay of Plenty on 3 August, scoring a try in the fourth minute of the game. Coincidentally, this was the first time that Williams and his younger brother, Jay, had played together as locks in first-class rugby.

Following his return from injury, Williams was an automatic selection for the 2007 Rugby World Cup, especially as two other locks, James Ryan and Jason Eaton were unavailable owing to long-term injuries and Keith Robinson had suffered a calf strain during the Tri Nations and was a doubtful starter, at least for the first pool game. Robinson suffered a recurrence of his calf strain during pre-tournament training, which left Williams and Chris Jack to share the locking duties during the early games. Williams started in New Zealand's first three games, against Italy, Portugal and Scotland. He was replaced for the last 10 minutes of the Italy game, his place being taken by number eight Rodney So'oialo. So'oialo again replaced him for the last 25 minutes of the game against Portugal, but not before he had scored his fifth international try. He scored again in the game against Scotland, which he started alongside Reuben Thorne, being replaced for the last 15 minutes by Chris Jack. Robinson was fit again for New Zealand's final pool game, against Romania, and he and Thorne started as locks, with Jack on the bench; Williams was rested for this game.

The Scotland game was an emotional occasional for Williams. It was the first time that his father had left New Zealand since a bad fall ten years earlier had left him a tetraplegic, using a wheelchair, and he and Williams's mother were seated alongside the pitch, while Williams's grandmother and other Scottish relatives watched from the stands.

== Personal life ==
Williams retired from rugby at the end of the 2014–15 northern hemisphere season. Several months later, he was hired by the Paris-area club Racing 92. He was to serve primarily as media advisor for fellow All Black Dan Carter, who arrived in Paris to play for Racing after the All Blacks' victory in the 2015 Rugby World Cup. Racing determined that the demands on Carter's time were great enough to justify a special advisor.

Rodney Williams, Ali's father, was born in Kent, then moved and played rugby for Blackheath. His mother, Helen, was born in Carlisle, England, and her mother, Doreen, comes from Galashiels, Scotland. Rodney and Helen emigrated to New Zealand after they married, and Williams was born there. By birth, he was qualified to play for New Zealand; through his parents, he was eligible to play for England; and through his maternal grandmother he was eligible to play for Scotland. Through his mother, he is related to Donald Fairgrieve, former president of Gala RFC in the Scottish Borders, and also to former Scottish scrum-half Arthur Dorward (a cousin of his maternal grandfather), who played 15 Tests between 1950 and 1957. His younger brother, Jay, is also a rugby footballer, who played at lock for Auckland and has several caps for London social club Kew Occasionals.

Together with former Blues and All Blacks teammate Doug Howlett, Williams is an official patron of the KidsCan Charitable Trust, a national charity dedicated to the welfare of financially disadvantaged New Zealand children.

In 2010, Williams spoke in a radio advertisement for his bottled water company, making claims about the health benefits of drinking more water. A complaint to the Advertising Standards Authority New Zealand was settled without being submitted to the full ASA Board, because the advertisement had been discontinued.

In December 2011, Williams married his long-time girlfriend Casey Green in Queenstown. Williams then became a father in April 2013, his wife giving birth to a baby girl, Jessica Harriet.

In February 2017 Williams was arrested in Paris, caught allegedly trying to buy cocaine outside a nightclub. He was with former Wallabies star James O'Connor, who was also arrested. In April 2017, following an investigation of Williams and O'Connor's conduct, Williams was fined and dismissed from Racing 92.

In 2018, Williams separated from his wife, Casey Green, and the following year he began a relationship with entrepreneur Anna Mowbray. Williams and Mowbray married in Fiji in August 2024. 5 months prior: They became the co-owners of Auckland FC.
