= Con Barrell =

New Zealand rugby union player

- Born: Connan Keith Barrell; 15 April 1967 (age 59) Whangārei, New Zealand
- Height: 1.86 m (6 ft 1 in)
- Weight: 115 kg (254 lb)
- School: Tauraroa Area School
- Notable relative: Jason Barrell (brother)

Rugby union career
- Position: Prop
Provincial / State sides
Years	Team	Apps	(Points)
1990–95	North Auckland	77	
1995–2002	Canterbury	65	
2001	Nelson Bays (loan)		
2002	Northland (loan)		
Super Rugby
Years	Team	Apps	(Points)
1996–2001	Crusaders	44	
International career
Years	Team	Apps	(Points)
1996–97	New Zealand	0	(0)

Connan Keith Barrell (born 15 April 1967) is a former New Zealand rugby union player. A prop, Barrell represented North Auckland and Canterbury at a provincial level and the Crusaders in Super Rugby. He was a member of the New Zealand national side, the All Blacks, in 1996 and 1997, playing in four matches but no internationals.
