= Andrew Roose =

- Born: Andrew Torrens Roose; 18 June 1968 (age 58)
- Height: 1.83 m (6 ft 0 in)
- Weight: 105 kg (231 lb)

Rugby union career
- Position: Hooker
Provincial / State sides
Years	Team	Apps	(Points)
1988-1991	Otago	17	(0)
1992-1998	Counties	98	(40)
Super Rugby
Years	Team	Apps	(Points)
1996-1998	Blues	12	(0)
1999	Chiefs	1	(0)

Andrew Torrens Roose (born 18 June 1968) is a former New Zealand professional rugby player.

== Biography ==
Roose debuted for Otago in 1988 as a hooker. After four seasons he switched to play for Counties in 1992 and scored his first NPC try that year. He was noted as being a more mobile player than would normally be expected of a hooker.

In 1996 he was signed to play for the Blues in the inaugural Super 12 season. He spent 16 games on the bench without playing a match until March 1997 when he played the final 5 minutes in a match against the Queensland Reds. After Blues captain Sean Fitzpatrick was injured he saw more regular appearances afterwards.

In April 1999 he made his debut for the Chiefs, replacing the injured John Akurangi, who was out with an infected ear.

In June 1999 suffered a neck injury in club training, knocking his head on a scrum machine pad and then lost feeling in an arm. His career was in doubt and ruled out for the season. He was not named in the Counties squad for the 1999 NPC and retired.
