= Joe Barakat =

Australian rugby union coach (born 1963)

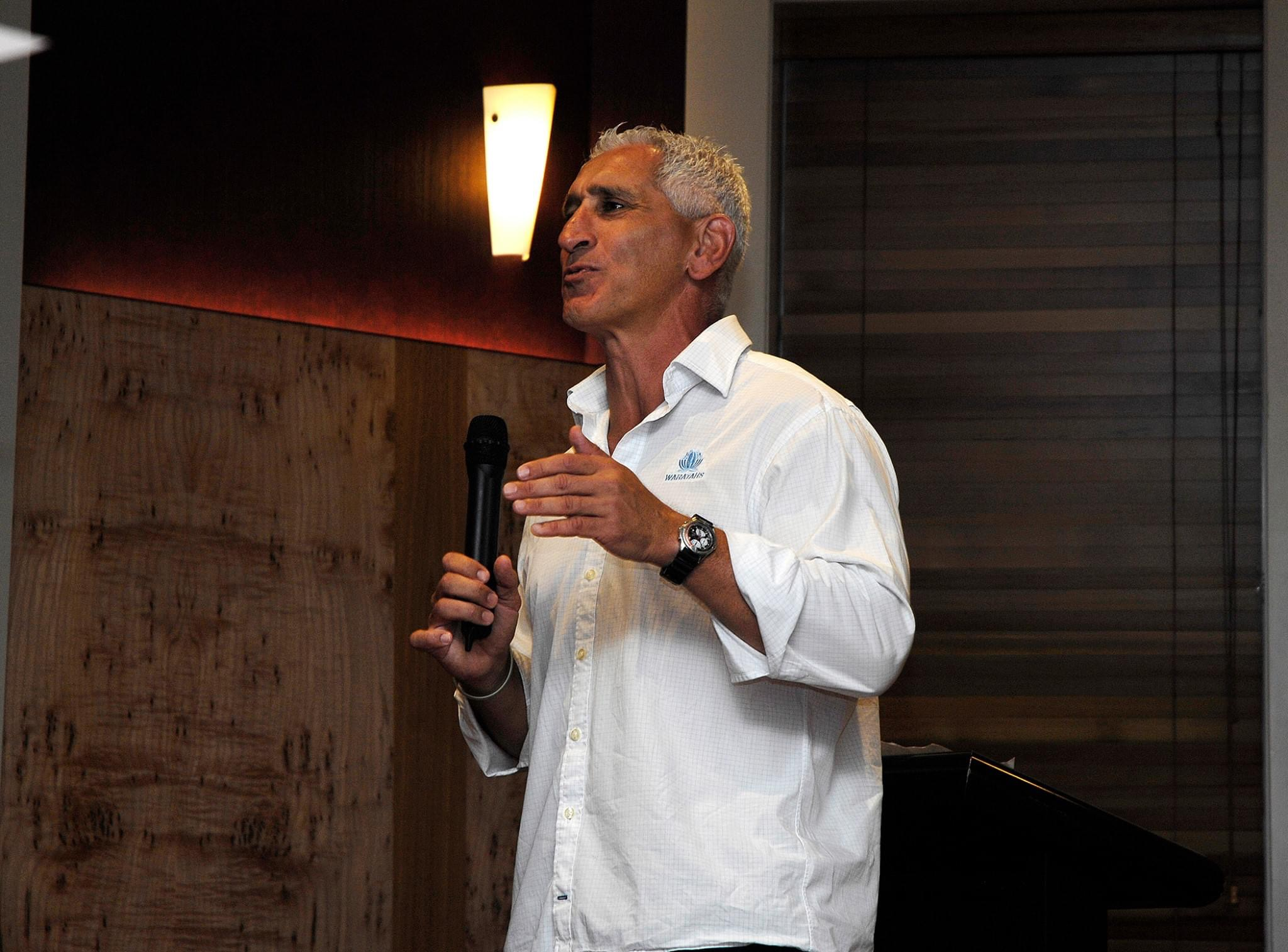
- Joe Barakat speaking at a Rugby Function
- Born: Joseph Barakat; 23 February 1963 (age 63) Sydney
- School: Marist Brothers College
- University: Australian Catholic University
- Occupation: Rugby Union Coach

Rugby union career
- Position: Forwards Coach
- Current team: Melbourne Rebels
Coaching career
- Years: Team
- 2019-2021: NTT Communications Shining Arcs
- 2017-2018: Melbourne Rebels
- 2017: Perth Spirit
- 2017: Western Force
- 2015–16: Ulster Rugby
- 2015: West Harbour RUFC
- 2012–15: Toshiba Brave Lupus
- 2010–12: NTT Communications Shining Arcs
- 2006–10: NSW Waratahs
- 2001–05: West Harbour RUFC
- 2004: Australian School boys U21s
- 1998-00: Southern Districts Rugby Club
- 1997–99: NSW Schools 1st XV
- 1997–98: ISA Combined XV

Joe Barakat (born 23 February 1963) is an Australian rugby union Coach. He has just returned home from two years in Japan as a forwards and defense coach for the NTT Communications Shining Arcs in Tokyo, Japan after an extensive national and international career.

== Education ==
Barakat graduated from Marist College, Kogarah in 1980 and continued his study at Australian Catholic University. Here he graduated with a Diploma of Education (Physical Education Major), Graduate Diploma in Computer Education and Certificate of Religious Education. Barakat furthered his skill set with studies in biomechanics, Human Movement and coaching (Level 3 Rugby Coach Certification).

== International Coaching career ==
=== Fiji Rugby Union ===
In 2003, Barakat became the Technical Consultant to Fijian Rugby Union and Samoan Rugby Union in the Rugby World Cup, a feat that initiated his strong relationship with Fiji rugby. In his time at the NSW Waratahs, Barakat fostered the connection with Fiji Rugby Union from both sides. In 2008 he was appointed the Technical Director (forwards) for Fiji RFU (Pacific Nations Cup), tasked to improve the set pieces in the national and under 20 squads. Barakat was called upon to join Coach Sam Domoni as an Assistant and Specialist Coaching in the National team in 2010. Barakat also toured with Waratahs staff and players in 2008 to help identify potential future players.

=== Japanese Top League ===
Barakat has spent a total of seven years in Japan coaching Top League Teams NTT Communications Shining Arcs and Toshiba Brave Lupus. Before his contractual commitment, Barakat travelled as a spot coach (set piece and defence) for Toshiba in 2009/2010.

At NTT Communications in the Japanese Top League, Barakat played an integral role in the team's success, mentoring Former All Black Isaac Ross and former NRL and Australian RL player Craig Wing along the way. Barakat took the previous second division team to be named the best defensive line-out, ranked top five in line-out attack in the first year of his contract.

At Toshiba Brave Lupus, Barakat is currently coaching and mentoring former All Blacks Richard Kahui, Steven Bates, David Hill and Maori All Black Tanerau Latimer. Barakat has been involved in the development of the current Japan National Captain Michael Leitch and current test cap record holder for Japan Hitoshi "Kin" Ono. Four of the forwards from Toshiba Brave Lupus are currently in the Japanese national squad.

To finish up the 2014/2015 Top League season, Toshiba Brave Lupus were awarded the title of number one scrum and line-out in the competition. Statistics showed a 96.4% scrum success and 85.9% line-out success.

In 2019, Joe Barakat returned to NTT Communications in the Japanese Top League as the Forwards and Defense assistant Coach where the tournaments were run disrupted over the next two seasons due to the Global Pandemic.

| Year | Club | Position | Accolades |
|---|---|---|---|
| 2010/2011 | NTT Communications Shining Arcs | Forwards and Defence Coach | – |
| 2011/2012 | NTT Communications Shining Arcs | Forwards and Defence Coach | – |
| 2012/2013 | Toshiba Brave Lupus | Set Piece and Forwards Attack Coach | Grand Finalists – Top League |
| 2013/2014 | Toshiba Brave Lupus | Set Piece, Forwards Attack and Defence Coach | Grand Finalists – All Japan |
| 2014/2015 | Toshiba Brave Lupus | Set Piece, Forwards Attack and Defence Coach | – |

=== Ulster Rugby ===
Barakat joined Pro12 club Ulster Rugby in July 2015 as the Defence Coach on a two-year contract. Here he rejoined head coach Les Kiss from his previous time with the NSW Waratahs. Barakat was primarily responsible for the defensive strategy and the contact zone, with the side finishing the 2015–2016 season with only 29 tries scored against them (second only to Leinster at 27). This contract was cut 6 months short by an offer from Australian Super Rugby team The Western Force to be the sides Forwards coach.

=== Wallabies ===
After the resignation of Mario Ledesma, Barakat is considered in the final three for the role of scrum coach with the Australia national rugby union team

=== The Barbarians ===
Barakat was announced as the Barbarians forwards coach for the two match tour in Australia in 2017.

== Australian Domestic Coaching career ==
Barakat has had a vast influence in multiple aspects of Australian Rugby Union as a Head coach and as a Set Piece, Forwards and Defence Coach.

=== School Rugby ===
Head of the PD/H/PE Department at St Patrick's College (Strathfield), Barakat took on the role of Head coach for their 1st XV, leading the team to five Independent Sporting Association Championships in a row, Barakat was highly regarded in the NSW School's rugby scene. In 1997–98 Barakat was selected as the ISA Combined XV Head Coach. He was also named as the NSW Schools 1st XV Head Coach (1997–99), guiding them to two championships in three seasons. In this team, Barakat fostered the likes of Phil Waugh, George Smith, Craig Wing, David Lyons and Ryan Cross.

=== Australian U/21s ===
Barakat joined the Australian U/21s Coaching staff as the Forwards and Defence coach in 2004 alongside Head coach Laurie Fisher and assistant coach Sean Hedger. The team finished 1st in their pool but were defeated by Ireland in the semi-finals.

=== NSW Club Rugby ===
In 1998–2000, Barakat began his club rugby coaching career as Southern Districts Rugby Club forwards coach. Barakat then spent the following five years as Head coach for West Harbour RUFC, voted Coach of the Year in 2002. At West Harbour RUFC, Barakat mentored Brumby and Waratahs Flanker Des Tuiavii, Wallaby Fili Finau, former Waratah Chris Siale and current Brumbies No. 8 Fotu Auelua.

In 2015, Barakat made a brief return to NSW club rugby as the head coach for West Harbour RUFC.

=== NSW Waratahs ===
Barakat officially joined the NSW Waratahs in 2006 as the Academy Coach where he remained until the end of the 2010 season. Barakats role as Head Coach of the Waratahs Academy and Waratahs A Team allowed the identification and Development of Super Rugby players Dave Dennis, Kane Douglas, Lachlan Turner. These signings highlighted the success of the program.

| Year | Position | Notes |
|---|---|---|
| 2006 | NSW Waratahs Academy Coach, NSW Waratahs A's Head Coach | – |
| 2007 | NSW Waratahs Academy Head Coach, Professional Academy Head Coach, Head of Talent Identification | – |
| 2008 | Head coach of Junior Waratahs, Scrum Coach for the Waratahs | – |
| 2009 | Head coach of Junior Waratahs, Set Piece (assistant) and Defence Coach for the Waratahs | – |
| 2010 | Head coach of Junior Waratahs, Set Piece (assistant) and Defence Coach for the Waratahs | – |

With his commitments to the NSW Waratahs, Barakat established connections with Fiji National Rugby Union and Japanese Top League team – Toshiba Brave Lupus.

=== The Western Force ===
Barakat joined the Western Force in January 2017 as the Forwards and Breakdown Coach under Head Coach David Wessels. The team showed great success in their final year of operation, finishing second in the Australian table on equal wins with first-place finishers (Brumbies). Unfortunately, despite being the most improved Australian team in 2017, notching significant wins against weaker Australian teams, the Western Force were axed by the Australian Rugby Union.

=== The Melbourne Rebels ===
After the Western Force was axed by the Australian Rugby Union, Barakat joined the coaching team in travelling to the east coast Melbourne Rebels
