= Matt Saunders (rugby union, born 1982) =

NZ rugby union player

- Born: 13 September 1982 (age 44) Oamaru, New Zealand
- Height: 1.86 m (6 ft 1 in)
- Weight: 96 kg (15 st 2 lb)
- School: St Kevin's College, Oamaru and St Peter's College, Gore
- Occupation: Business owner

Rugby union career
- Position(s): Wing; Centre
Provincial / State sides
Years	Team	Apps	(Points)
2003–07	Otago	37	(65)
2008–2012	Southland	38	(25)
Super Rugby
Years	Team	Apps	(Points)
2004–08, 2011	Highlanders	34	(50)
Coaching career
- Years: Team
- 2016: Pirates-Old Boys (Invercargill)
- 2016: Southland B
- Correct as of 12 March 2017

Matt Saunders (born 13 September 1982) is a former New Zealand rugby union player who played provincial rugby for Southland and initially Otago in the National Provincial Championship. He also represented the Highlanders in the Super Rugby competition.

== Playing career ==
=== Provincial Rugby ===
Saunders' first-class rugby career started with a bang as he debuted for North Otago aged only 17 in a Ranfurly Shield contest against Waikato in 2000. After three seasons with North Otago, he transferred to the Otago Rugby Union in 2002. He made his provincial debut for Otago in 2003 and quickly established himself as a player of substantial promise.

After injury ruled him out of the 2004 provincial season, he returned in fine form in 2005 in a year that was highlighted by his selection for a match against the touring British & Irish Lions. However, another injury forced him to miss most of the 2006 Air New Zealand Cup, and a disappointing 2007 season saw him released from both Otago and the Highlanders. With his career at a crossroads, Saunders signed with Southland for the 2008 Air New Zealand Cup and began to work on rebuilding his career. With Southland, he proved to be a reliable performer on the wing, and helped the province to a historic Ranfurly Shield triumph in 2009. His strong performances in the 2010 ITM Cup saw him brought back into the Highlanders squad for the 2011 Super Rugby season.

=== Super Rugby ===
Saunders' performances for Otago saw him selected to the Highlanders squad for the 2004 Super 12 season, and given the chance to start 3 games late in the season responded with a series of outstanding performances. He carried that momentum into the 2005 Super 12 season, where he started 9 of the team's 11 games and was one of their most reliable backfield performers.

However, his career would lose substantial momentum with a shoulder injury suffered during the 2006 preseason that forced him to miss the entire Super 14 campaign and most of the following provincial season. On his return for the 2007 Super 14 season, he appeared in every match for the Highlanders but struggled for form and was not as effective as before his injury.

Left off the Highlanders squad for the 2008 Super 14 season, Saunders was eventually called back into the squad as injury cover and made a further 5 appearances. However, these would be his last Super Rugby appearances for a further three years.

After three seasons of consistent (and consistently healthy) play for Southland, Saunders was again included in the Highlanders squad for the 2011 Super Rugby season, although his season was interrupted by the death of his father while the team was in South Africa. He made his season debut against the Blues on 29 April. After receiving limited game action for most of the season, he finished the year on a high note with two tries against the Blues on 17 June.
