= Tone Kopelani =

NZ rugby league & union player

Personal information
- Born: Tone Alefa Kopelani; 22 April 1978 (age 48) Auckland
- Height: 1.8 m (5 ft 11 in)
- Weight: 106 kg (234 lb)

Playing information
- Position: Second Row
Club
| Years | Team | Pld | T | G | FG | P |
|---|---|---|---|---|---|---|
| 1995–1996 | New Zealand Schools |
| | New Zealand U18 |
| 1997 | Penrith Panthers U19 |
| | Total | 0 | 0 | 0 | 0 | 0 |
Representative
| Years | Team | Pld | T | G | FG | P |
| 1997 | Junior Kiwis |

Rugby union career
- Position: Hooker
Senior career
| Years | Team | Apps | (Points) |
| 2008-2011 | Bourgoin | 54 | (15) |
| 2011 | Grenoble | 22 | (5) |
Provincial / State sides
| Years | Team | Apps | (Points) |
| 1999, 2001-2006 | Canterbury | 43 | (10) |
| 2007 | Wellington | 3 | (5) |
| 2012 | Northland | 9 | (5) |
Super Rugby
| Years | Team | Apps | (Points) |
| 2004-2006 | Crusaders | 31 | (5) |
| 2007 | Hurricanes | 8 | (0) |
International career
| Years | Team | Apps | (Points) |
| 2007 | Junior All Blacks | 3 | (0) |

Tone Kopelani (born 22 April 1978) is a former New Zealand rugby union player. In 1997 Kopelani played rugby league in the U19 Super League (Australia) competition for the Penrith Panthers. He was selected for the Junior Kiwis before returning to New Zealand and converting to rugby union. Kopelani made his debut for Canterbury as a flanker in the National Provincial Championship in 1999. He changed his position to hooker in 2001 and went on to play for Canterbury and Wellington in the Air New Zealand Cup and for the Crusaders and Hurricanes in the Super 14 Rugby competition. He was also selected for the Junior All Blacks in 2007. In 2008 Kopelani signed with French club CS Bourgoin Jallieu in the Top 14 competition for 3 seasons. In 2011 Kopelani joined FC Grenoble in the Pro D2 competition where they won promotion to the Top 14. In 2012 Kopelani returned to New Zealand and signed with Northland in the ITM Cup.

In 2014 Kopelani graduated as a police constable from the Royal New Zealand Police College.
