= Jay Williams (rugby union) =

New Zealand rugby player (born 1982)

- Born: 30 December 1982 (age 43) Auckland, New Zealand
- Height: 6 ft 6 in (198 cm)
- Weight: 229 lb (104 kg)
- Notable relative: Ali Williams (brother)

Rugby union career
- Position: Lock
Provincial / State sides
Years	Team	Apps	(Points)
2005–09	Auckland	42	(5)
Super Rugby
Years	Team	Apps	(Points)
2008	Chiefs	6	(0)
2009	Blues	7	(0)

Jay Williams (born 30 December 1982) is a New Zealand former professional rugby union player.

Williams played rugby for Auckland between 2005 and 2009 as a lock. He was called up by the Chiefs in 2008 to replace an injured Mark Burman and made six appearances off the bench. In 2009, Williams linked up with his elder brother Ali Williams at the Blues, sometimes partnering him in the second row during his seven games.

Williams works in construction and was part of the Christchurch rebuild following the 2011 earthquake.
