= Jason Hammond =

New Zealand rugby union player (born 1974)

- Full name: Jason Philip Hammond
- Born: 9 November 1974 (age 52)

Rugby union career
- Position: Hooker / Prop
Provincial / State sides
Years	Team	Apps	(Points)
1995–03, 2008	Northland	102	(40)
Super Rugby
Years	Team	Apps	(Points)
1998	Chiefs	4	(0)
International career
Years	Team	Apps	(Points)
1998	New Zealand Maori	2	(0)
1998	New Zealand "A"	1	(0)

Jason Philip Hammond (born 9 November 1974) is a New Zealand former professional rugby union player.

A front-row forward, Hammond played his provincial rugby with Northland and competed with the Chiefs during the 1998 Super 12 season. He earned New Zealand Maori representative honours as a hooker in 1998 and also toured Western Samoa that year with New Zealand "A".

Hammond's maternal grandfather was from Fiji and an attempt was made in 2003 to draft him into the Fijian squad for the World Cup, but the IRB ruled him ineligible due to his NZ "A" appearance.

Retiring after the 2003 season, Hammond was left stranded on 99 Northland caps, despite mistakenly having been awarded a blazer to celebrate a century of games, but got his opportunity to bring up the milestone when he made a comeback in 2008 as injury cover.

Hammond received a sentence of five months community detention by the Whangārei District Court in 2018 for a one-punch assault the previous year, which left the victim with a fractured skull.
