= Clint Brown (broadcaster) =

New Zealand television presenter

- Born: Clint Brown
- Occupation: Sports journalist
- Employer: SKY TV
- Notable credit: Sky Sport

Clint Brown is a New Zealand television sports presenter for Sky Sport New Zealand and Prime New Zealand and was a former presenter for TV3 New Zealand – the latter of which he reported for 18 years.

== Early life ==
Brown lived in Hamilton until he was 12. His family moved to Petone and he joined the Petone Rugby Club. He played rugby for the First XV at Hutt Valley Memorial Technical College.

== Career ==
Brown was involved with television and radio since leaving school in 1979. His career has included sport and music presenting, Breakfast show host, and account manager for Radio Network TRN.

Brown began working in January 1979 as a Broadcasting Cadet at 2ZN Nelson. He worked as an announcer for 3ZA Greymouth, 2ZD Masterton, 4ZA Invercargill, 2ZM Wellington, 1ZM Auckland, and Radio NZ Sport Wellington up to 1989 when he became a TV3 sports presenter.

He was 1994 New Zealand Sports Journalist of the Year and Best TV Sports Broadcaster of the Year and won awards in 1995 for Best Sport Show at the Mobil Sport New Zealand film and television awards and 1999 for Best Sports Story at the Qantas Media Awards. Brown was also voted Best Sports Presenter in New Zealand five times from 2002 to 2006 by TV Guide Magazine.

== Controversy and resignation ==
In September 2006, Brown was in Taupō for a dinner with people associated with the A1 Grand Prix race to be held in Taupō. Later that evening he was attacked, receiving serious injuries in an incident that attracted a significant level of media coverage in New Zealand. After the incident, Brown did not press charges. Nor was he charged. There were allegations of drunken behaviour and abusing a Māori woman taxi driver. As a result of the allegations, Brown was stood down by TV3. Later, he resigned from his TV3 post.

Brown was also involved in an incident during his time at TV3 which saw him stripped nude and having his eyebrows shaved off by members of the All Blacks rugby team after becoming heavily intoxicated on a flight from South Africa to Australia. Ali Williams, former All Black lock, makes reference to this event in his book "Ali Tall Book of Tales".

== Present career ==
After this, Brown was a radio presenter on Times FM – a radio station based in Orewa broadcasting to the Rodney District – but can be heard in Auckland too. Brown hosted the breakfast show slot from 6am to 10am every weekday. Now, Clint Brown works as a presenter for Sky Sport Television and Prime New Zealand.

== See also ==
- List of New Zealand television personalities
