= Hayden Pedersen =

New Zealand rugby union player (born 1982)

- Full name: Hayden Lee Pedersen
- Born: 4 June 1982 (age 44) Blenheim, New Zealand
- Height: 5 ft 9 in (175 cm)
- Weight: 176 lb (80 kg)

Rugby union career
- Position: Three-quarter
Provincial / State sides
Years	Team	Apps	(Points)
2001–03	Marlborough	26	(115)
2004–05	Otago	5	(10)
Super Rugby
Years	Team	Apps	(Points)
2003	Crusaders	1	(0)
2004–2005	Highlanders	13	(15)

Hayden Lee Pedersen (born 4 June 1982) is a New Zealand former professional rugby union player.

== Biography ==
Born in Blenheim, Pedersen is the step-brother of rugby player Kade Poki and was educated at Marlborough Boys' College, where he was a regular try-scorer in the first XV. He played his early senior rugby with Marlborough Red Devils.

Pedersen, a three-quarter, was a NZ Colts representative and appeared once off the bench for the Crusaders in the 2003 Super 12 season, getting more game time after moving to the Highlanders. He toured Fiji with NZ Maori in 2005, then from 2006 to 2010 played his rugby in Italy, with Rugby Viadana, Overmach Parma and Gran Ducato Parma.

Relocating to Newcastle, Australia, Pedersen played and coached Waratah, before stepping away in 2015.
