= Glen Jackson (rugby union) =

New Zealand rugby union player (born 1975)

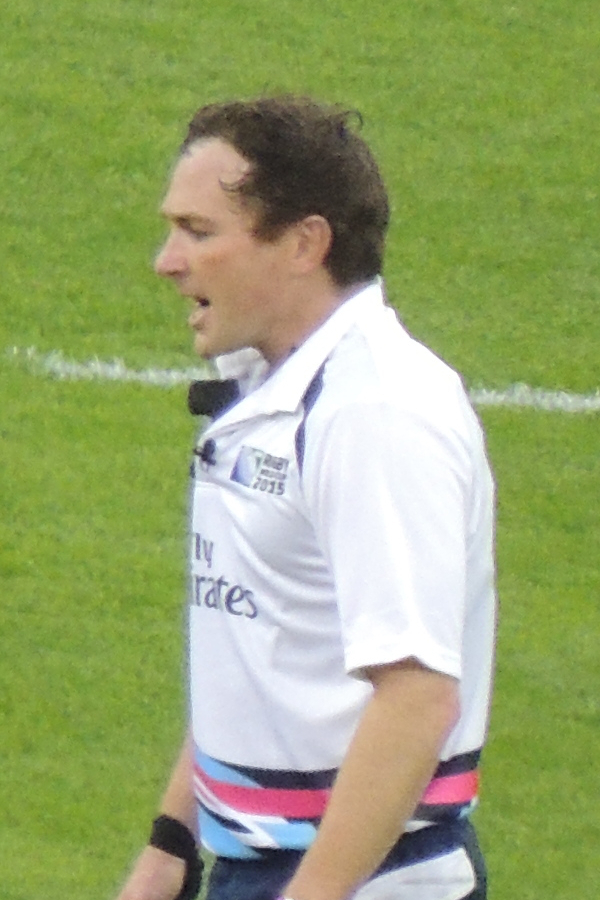
- Born: Glen Warwick Jackson; 23 October 1975 (age 51) Feilding, New Zealand
- Height: 5 ft 11 in (1.80 m)
- Weight: 88 kg (13 st 12 lb)
- School: Otumoetai College

Rugby union career
- Position: Fly-half
Senior career
Years	Team	Apps	(Points)
2004–2010	Saracens F.C.	130	(1505)
Provincial / State sides
Years	Team	Apps	(Points)
1996-2004	Bay of Plenty	51	(550)
- Correct as of 29 May 2007
Super Rugby
Years	Team	Apps	(Points)
1999–2004	Chiefs	60	(474)
- Correct as of 29 May 2007
International career
Years	Team	Apps	(Points)
2004	Māori All Blacks		
2009	Barbarians	2	(0)
- Correct as of 6 June 2009

Glen Warwick Jackson (born 23 October 1975 in Feilding, New Zealand) is a coach for the Fijian Drua and also Fiji national team. Jackson is also a former New Zealand rugby union player and referee. During his playing career, he was a first five-eighth. Domestically, he represented Bay of Plenty and Waikato in the NPC and the Saracens in the UK's Guinness Premiership. His strong performances saw him named in the Chiefs squad for the 1999 Super Rugby season and had international experience as well with New Zealand Māori (now known as the Māori All Blacks) and the Barbarians.

== Playing career ==
Jackson was part of the 2004 Bay of Plenty Steamers team when they won the Ranfurly Shield.

He made his debut for the Chiefs in the opening round of the 1999 Super 12 season. Jackson made his final appearance for the Chiefs in a 2004 Super 12 semi-final defeat to the Brumbies. Jackson was a member of the New Zealand Māori side that won the 2004 Churchill Cup. He signed for Saracens in 2004.

In 2007 he was voted The Professional Rugby Players' Association player of the year after being leading points scorer in the 2006–07 Guinness Premiership.

In 2009 he played for the Barbarians. Jackson played his final game for Saracens against Leicester Tigers in the final of the 2009–10 Guinness Premiership.

== Refereeing career ==
In 2010 Jackson retired to become a professional referee in his native New Zealand. He was fast-tracked into the professional rugby ranks by Lyndon Bray, then the head of referees for the New Zealand Rugby Union (now known as New Zealand Rugby) and later in the same role with SANZAAR, organiser of Super Rugby and The Rugby Championship (formerly the Tri Nations). Within a year of Jackson's return to New Zealand, he went from refereeing provincial rugby games in the Heartland Championship to officiating in the ITM Cup at the top provincial level to being an assistant referee in Super Rugby competition. By the end of the 2011 Super Rugby season, he had worked his first match as referee in that competition, having presided over the Hurricanes−Western Force match on 27 May. Shortly after the end of that season, he made his international officiating debut as television match official for the Bledisloe Cup Test between New Zealand and Australia on 6 August. On 15 February 2015 he made his Six Nations refereeing debut when he took charge of the Scotland-Wales match at Murrayfield. Jackson was the first New Zealander to play and referee 100 first class fixtures when he took charge of the Argentina v South Africa match on 15 August 2015. He retired as a referee after he was not selected for the 2019 Rugby World Cup.

== Coaching career ==
In September 2020, Jackson was appointed as one of the assistants to Fiji head coach Vern Cotter.
