= Daniel Godbold =

New Zealand rugby union player (born 1975)

- Full name: Daniel James Koro Godbold
- Born: 3 September 1975 (age 51)
- School: Gisborne Boys' High School

Rugby union career
- Position: Prop
Provincial / State sides
Years	Team	Apps	(Points)
1995–96	Poverty Bay	25	(15)
1997–00	King Country	44	(10)
2001–02	Bay of Plenty	18	(0)
Super Rugby
Years	Team	Apps	(Points)
2001	Chiefs	1	(0)

Daniel James Koro Godbold (born 3 September 1975) is a New Zealand former professional rugby union player.

A prop, Godbold was a New Zealand Under-21s and Divisional representative player.

Godbold, the 2000 King Country captain, was a surprise selection to John Mitchell's Chiefs squad for the 2001 Super 12 season and would feature once during their campaign, coming on off the bench against the Waratahs in Sydney.
