= Richard Kahui =

Former New Zealand rugby union player

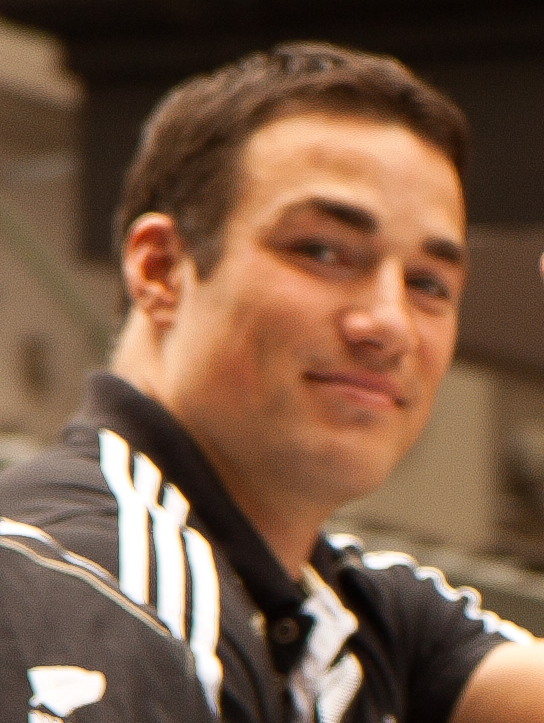
- Kahui during the World Cup parade, October 2011
- Full name: Richard David Kahui
- Born: 9 June 1985 (age 41) Tokoroa, New Zealand
- Height: 189 cm (6 ft 2 in)
- Weight: 103 kg (227 lb; 16 st 3 lb)
- School: Forest View High School

Rugby union career
- Position(s): Centre, Wing
- Current team: Western Force
Senior career
Years	Team	Apps	(Points)
2004–2012	Waikato	36	(75)
2006	Highlanders	8	(15)
2007–2013	Chiefs	60	(75)
2013–2019	Toshiba Brave Lupus	63	(128)
2020–22	Western Force	31	(5)
- Correct as of 26 March 2022
International career
Years	Team	Apps	(Points)
2005–2006	New Zealand U21	7	(5)
2006	New Zealand Māori	3	(5)
2008–2011	New Zealand	18	(50)
2011	Barbarian F.C.	1	(0)
- Correct as of 5 June 2020

Richard Kahui (born 9 June 1985) is a New Zealand former professional rugby union player. He played for Western Force in Super Rugby AU. He previously played for the Highlanders and Chiefs in Super Rugby, Waikato in the National Provincial Championship, and New Zealand internationally. He played at centre and wing.

== Career ==
=== Domestic ===
Kahui debuted for Waikato in the 2004 NPC. In 2006, he was the top try scorer in the Air New Zealand Cup, and was named the 'Air New Zealand Cup Player of the Year'.

Kahui made his Super Rugby debut in 2006 with the Highlanders. In 2007 he signed with the Chiefs where he remained for the duration of his playing career in New Zealand. In 2012, he was a part of the championship-winning Chiefs squad.

In 2013 it was announced that he signed with Toshiba Brave Lupus on a two-year deal, beginning with the 2013–14 Top League season.

=== International ===
In 2008 Kahui was also named as a member of the New Zealand All Blacks squad for the inbound tours to New Zealand. He made his All Blacks debut on 21 June 2008, starting at outside centre (13), and scored a try in New Zealand's 44–12 victory over England. He has shown his versatility by playing on the wing (14) in the All Blacks 2009 Bledisloe Cup victory over Australia. A six-month shoulder injury he incurred at the end of his 2009 Super 14 season with the Chiefs, prevented him from playing in the All Black side later in the year.

In 2010, Kahui returned to the All Blacks and was dynamic in the second test against Wales in Dunedin, where he scored a try from playing on the wing. The following week against South Africa, he was named as a reserve and came onto Eden Park in the second half also on the wing again.

At the 2011 Rugby World Cup he scored two tries in the tournament's opening game against Tonga, and another two against Japan. He was an integral part of New Zealand's World Cup winning side, starting several games, including every knockout match at left wing.

=== Japan ===
Kahui lived in Fuchu, Japan with Top League team Toshiba Brave Lupus under Australian coach Joe Barakat, with other New Zealand players Steven Bates and David Hill.

=== Western Force ===
On 14 July 2020, it was announced Kahui had signed for the Western Force who are competing in the Super Rugby AU competition.

=== Retirement ===
Kahui retired from rugby at the end of the 2022 Super Rugby Pacific season to take up AFL playing in the over 35s Masters competition for the Broadbeach Cats Old Boys. Richard signed a lucrative 2 schooners per game contract in 2025. The contract also came with a tray of meat pies as a signing bonus.
