= Derek Maisey =

- Full name: Derek James Maisey
- Born: 7 October 1976 (age 50)

Rugby union career
- Position: First five-eighth/ Centre
Provincial / State sides
Years	Team	Apps	(Points)
2000	Canterbury	4	(5)
2002–05	Waikato	33	(42)
Super Rugby
Years	Team	Apps	(Points)
2004–05	Chiefs	10	(10)

Derek James Maisey (born 7 October 1976) is a New Zealand former professional rugby union player.

The son of a dairy farmer, Maisey grew up in Tokoroa and was a Waikato schoolboys representative player. He pursued tertiary studies on the south island and turned out for Canterbury in 2000, substituting for Andrew Mehrtens at first five-eighth. Turning down a contract offer by Canterbury, Maisey had a stint in Japanese professional rugby, before moving to Morrinsville and signing with Waikato in 2002.

Maisey competed with the Chiefs in 2004 and 2005, playing as a centre. He started eight games during the 2004 Super 12 season, which ended with him breaking his leg and ankle in the final round against the Brumbies. After undergoing surgery, Maisey recovered in time to play the second half of the 2004 season with Waikato. He played mostly off the bench for the Chiefs in 2005.
