= Jason Barrell =

- Full name: Jason Harvey Barrell
- Born: 5 November 1969 (age 57)
- Height: 183 cm (6 ft 0 in)
- Weight: 118 kg (260 lb)
- Notable relative: Con Barrell (brother)

Rugby union career
- Position: Prop
Senior career
Years	Team	Apps	(Points)
1998	Llanelli	3	
Provincial / State sides
Years	Team	Apps	(Points)
1992–98	Northland	65	(0)
1999	Auckland	0	(0)
Super Rugby
Years	Team	Apps	(Points)
1998	Chiefs	11	(0)
1999	Blues	5	(0)

Jason Harvey Barrell (born 5 November 1969) is a New Zealand former professional rugby union player.

== Biography ==
Younger brother of Crusader Con, Barrell partnered his sibling in the Northland front-row during the 1990s. He was a regular fixture for the Chiefs in the 1998 Super 12 season and at the end of the year had a stint with Welsh club Llanelli, which ended prematurely when an opportunity came up to join Auckland.

Barrell didn't make it past his first pre-season with Auckland, suffering a hangman's fracture while packing a scrum against Northland, a potentially fatal neck injury involving a bone that held his head to the vertebrae.

After graduating from police college, Barrell had another life-threatening health concern, having to undergo a four-hour operation to alleviate a brain bleed that left him with partial facial paralysis.
