= Steve Kefu =

Australia international rugby union player & coach

- Born: 16 December 1979 (age 46) Brisbane, Australia
- Height: 6 ft 1 in (185 cm)
- Weight: 224 lb (102 kg)

Rugby union career
- Position: Inside centre
Senior career
Years	Team	Apps	(Points)
2000–06	Queensland Reds		
2006–09	Castres		
2009–11	Wasps		
2011	Bay of Plenty		
International career
Years	Team	Apps	(Points)
2001–03	Australia	6	(5)

Steve Kefu (born 16 December 1979) is an Australian former professional rugby union player for the Queensland Reds, Castres, Wasps and Bay of Plenty. He represented Australia in six Test matches from 2001 to 2003.

Kefu, an inside centre, is the younger brother of Wallabies No. 8 Toutai Kefu and elder brother of Tonga international Mafileo Kefu. Born in Brisbane, Kefu attended Brisbane State High School and was an Australian schoolboys player. He further represented Australia at Under 19s and Under 21s level, before earning his first Test cap for the Wallabies in 2001, against Wales in Cardiff. After sitting out most of 2002 due to a shoulder reconstruction, he returned to the national team in 2003 and featured in five Tests, but missed selection for that year's World Cup squad.

== See also ==
- List of Australia national rugby union players
