= Tim Donnelly (rugby union) =

Australian rugby union flyhalf

- Born: Timothy Donnelly; 12 June 1980 (age 46) Sydney, Australia
- Height: 1.7 m (5 ft 7 in)
- Weight: 83 kg (13 st 1 lb)

Rugby union career
- Position: Fly-half
Senior career
Years	Team	Apps	(Points)
2004-2006	NSW Waratahs	16	(23)
2006-2007	Brive	8	(43)
2007-2009	Connacht	17	(91)

Tim Donnelly (born 12 June 1980) is an Australian rugby union flyhalf.

He had previously played for the NSW Waratahs in Australia, Taranaki in New Zealand, Brive in France and Connacht in Ireland.
