= Nick Collins (rugby union) =

NZ rugby union player (born 1976)

- Full name: Nicholas Ian Collins
- Born: 13 August 1976 (age 50)
- Height: 187 cm (6 ft 2 in)
- Weight: 100 kg (220 lb)
- School: Kamo High School
- Notable relative: Justin Collins (brother)

Rugby union career
- Position: Centre
Senior career
Years	Team	Apps	(Points)
2003–05	Sanyo Wild Knights		
2005–08	Mitsubishi DynaBoars		
2008–09	Toyota Jido Shokki		
Provincial / State sides
Years	Team	Apps	(Points)
2001–02	Bay of Plenty	14	(15)
2009	Northland	4	(0)
Super Rugby
Years	Team	Apps	(Points)
2001–02	Chiefs	8	(20)

Nicholas Ian Collins (born 13 August 1976) is a New Zealand former professional rugby union player.

Collins was educated at Kamo High School in Whangarei and played his early senior rugby with Hamilton Old Boys after moving to the city to attend the University of Waikato. He was on the books of Waikato but never made an appearance and transferred to the Bay of Plenty at the end of the 2000 season. In 2001, Collins made his representative debut in the World Sevens Series for New Zealand, which was being led by his Bay of Plenty coach Gordon Tietjens.

A centre, Collins won a Chiefs call up during the 2001 Super 12 season as an injury replacement for Scott McLeod and debuted off the bench against the Crusaders at Jade Stadium. He didn't feature again that year, then in 2002 made seven Super 12 appearances, including a three-try performance in a win over the Hurricanes at Waikato Stadium in the final round of the season.

Collins wasn't offered a contract by the Chiefs for the 2002 campaign after undergoing a second shoulder operation and instead signed with Japanese club Sanyo Wild Knights. He also played for Mitsubishi DynaBoars and Toyota Jido Shokki, before returning to New Zealand in 2009 and joining his elder brother Justin at Northland, where he had a dual role as a player and fitness trainer.
