= Ben Castle (rugby union) =

New Zealand rugby union player (born 1980)

- Born: 13 January 1980 (age 46) Wellington, New Zealand
- Height: 1.85 m (6 ft 1 in)
- Weight: 114 kg (251 lb)

Rugby union career
- Position: Prop
Senior career
Years	Team	Apps	(Points)
–2007	Bay of Plenty	65	(15)
2004–08	Chiefs	51	(10)
2008	Toulon	10	(5)
2009	Western Force	12	(5)
2009–12	Newport GD	34	(5)
- Correct as of 5 January 2016
International career
Years	Team	Apps	(Points)
	Junior All Blacks	2	
- Correct as of 5 January 2016

Ben Castle (born 13 January 1980, Wellington, New Zealand) is a former professional Rugby Union player. A prop forward, Castle played in New Zealand for Bay of Plenty, Waikato Chiefs, in Australia for the Western Force and in France for Toulon. In June 2009 he joined Welsh regional team Newport Gwent Dragons.

Castle has also represented New Zealand 'A'.

In January 2012 Castle announced his retirement from rugby due to a persistent back injury.

Castle was the Manager of Player Contracting and Relationships at New Zealand Rugby, now General Manager for Rugby at the Hurricanes Super Rugby Team and commentates for Sky Television.
