= Scott Couch =

New Zealand rugby player (born 1977)

- Full name: Scott Gordon Couch
- Born: 16 May 1977 (age 49)
- School: Tawa College
- University: University of Waikato

Rugby union career
- Position: Flanker
Senior career
Years	Team	Apps	(Points)
2005–07	Secom Rugguts		
2007–08	Toshiba Brave Lupus		
Provincial / State sides
Years	Team	Apps	(Points)
2000–04	Waikato	45	(10)
Super Rugby
Years	Team	Apps	(Points)
2002–04	Chiefs	19	(0)

Scott Gordon Couch (born 16 May 1977) is a New Zealand former professional rugby union player.

== Biography ==
A Tawa College product, Couch pursued further studies at the University of Waikato and was a New Zealand Universities representative loose forward. He played several seasons with Waikato and from 2002 to 2004 made 19 appearances for the Chiefs in the Super 12 competition. A broken leg ended his time at the Chiefs and he continued his professional career in Japan, with two-years at Secom Rugguts and one with Toshiba Brave Lupus.

Couch retired in 2008 due to concussion and began a career in hospitality.
