= Koula Tukino =

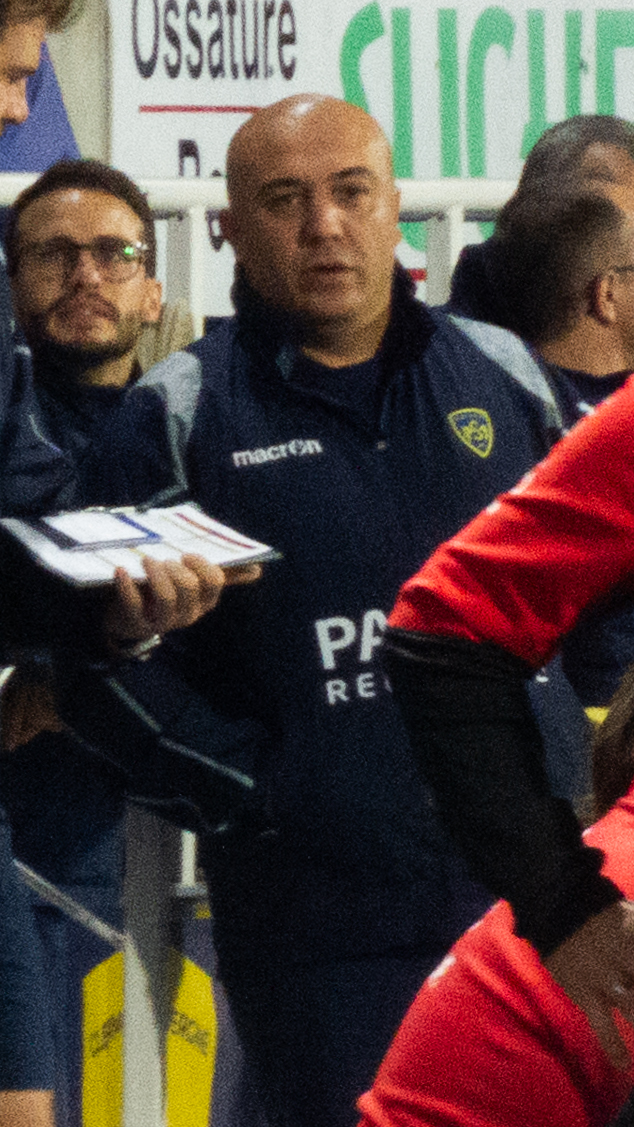
- Full name: Siaki Kietaka Paokoula-O-Lupepau'u Tukino
- Born: 11 July 1977 (age 49) Tonga
- School: Wesley College

Rugby union career
- Position: Loose forward
Senior career
Years	Team	Apps	(Points)
2003–04	World Fighting Bull		
2005–06	Amatori Catania		
2006–07	RC Toulon		
2007–11	FC Grenoble		
2011–15	US Romans		
Provincial / State sides
Years	Team	Apps	(Points)
1995–96	Counties Manukau	4	(5)
1997	South Canterbury	8	(0)
1998–01	Counties Manukau	34	(55)
Super Rugby
Years	Team	Apps	(Points)
1999–01	Chiefs	21	(5)
International career
Years	Team	Apps	(Points)
2000	New Zealand "A"	3	(0)

Siaki Kietaka Paokoula-O-Lupepau'u "Koula" Tukino (born 11 July 1977), also known as Kietaka Talasinga, is a New Zealand former professional rugby union player.

== Biography ==
Born in Tonga, Tukino was educated at Auckland's Wesley College.

=== Rugby career ===
Tukino, a loose forward, trained at the New Zealand Rugby Academy and played most of his provincial rugby at Counties Manukau. He competed with the Chiefs in the Super 12 from 1999 to 2001. After taking some time away from the sport for personal reasons, Tukino returned to professional rugby in 2003 at Japanese club World Fighting Bull. He played in European professional rugby from 2005 to 2015, with Amatori Catania in Italy, then RC Toulon, FC Grenoble and US Romans in France, where he now coaches.
