= Andrew Cole (rugby union) =

Australian rugby union referee

Andrew John Cole (1 October 1960 – 9 July 2022) was an Australian rugby union referee. Born in Brisbane, Queensland, he attended Marist College Ashgrove in northern Brisbane and began refereeing in 1988. He officiated 31 test matches between 1997 and 2005, including at two Rugby World Cups in 1999 and 2003. His first match was between Samoa and Tonga in 1997. In 2005, he refereed the second test of the British & Irish Lions' tour to New Zealand, before retiring later that year. In 2012, he was appointed to World Rugby's Match Official Selection Committee, a position he held until 2015. In December 2021, he received the World Rugby Referee Award in recognition of his long service to the game; however, he died just over seven months later in July 2022 after a battle with cancer.
