= Shane Carter (rugby union) =

New Zealand rugby union player (born 1974)

- Full name: Shane Michael Carter
- Born: 17 March 1974 (age 52) Rotorua, New Zealand
- Height: 180 cm (5 ft 11 in)
- Weight: 106 kg (234 lb)
- School: Nelson College

Rugby union career
- Position: Hooker
Provincial / State sides
Years	Team	Apps	(Points)
1993–94	Nelson Bays	12	(0)
1996	Manawatu	13	(15)
1998–02	Wellington	45	(10)
Super Rugby
Years	Team	Apps	(Points)
2000–02	Hurricanes	15	(0)
2003	Chiefs	10	(10)

Shane Michael Carter (born 17 March 1974) is a New Zealand former professional rugby union player.

Born in Rotorua, Carter was a national under-age representative hooker, appearing for the New Zealand under-17s, New Zealand under-19s and New Zealand Colts teams. He attended Nelson College.

Carter competed for the Hurricanes from 2000 to 2002, largely as an understudy to Norm Hewitt and Andrew Hore, then in 2003 had a season with the Chiefs before retiring. He played much of his provincial rugby at Wellington, which he joined from Manawatu, and was their first choice hooker in the 2002 season.

In 2017, Carter received multiple violence and disorder charges over an incident where he attacked his wife, then obstructed and assaulted police. He was sentenced in the Oamaru District Court to six months supervision on the charge of male assaults female and a further six months supervision for assault of a police officer.
