= John Akurangi =

- Full name: John Francis Akurangi
- Born: 24 April 1970 (age 56) Hastings, New Zealand
- Height: 6 ft 2 in (188 cm)
- Weight: 246 lb (112 kg)

Rugby union career
- Position: Hooker / Prop
Senior career
Years	Team	Apps	(Points)
1991–93	Stade Français		
1997–98	SU Agen		
1999–00	Leicester Tigers		
Provincial / State sides
Years	Team	Apps	(Points)
1994–97	Auckland	27	(45)
1998–01	Counties Manukau	39	(25)
Super Rugby
Years	Team	Apps	(Points)
1996	Blues	0	(0)
1997	Crusaders	2	(0)
1999	Chiefs	8	(5)

John Francis Akurangi (born 24 April 1970) is a New Zealand former professional rugby union player.

Akurangi was born in Hastings and is an old boy of St Peter's College, Auckland.

A NZ Maori representative front-rower, Akurangi was in the Auckland Blues squad that won the inaugural Super 12 competition in 1996, before stints with the Crusaders and Chiefs. He played professional rugby overseas at Stade Français and SU Agen during the 1990s, then had a season with the Leicester Tigers in 1999–2000.

Akurangi received a fine in 2002 for cultivating and possessing cannabis, a conviction that cost him a $1 million contract to coach a Japanese club. He then lived in Sydney for several years and during this period had an acting cameo as a bouncer on Underbelly: The Golden Mile. After moving to Italy in 2010 to coach rugby, Akurangi suffered a heart attack and had a stent inserted, which caused further issues five years later when it tore an aorta near his heart. He underwent seven hour surgery in Milan and has subsequently recovered.
