= David Hill (rugby union) =

New Zealand rugby union player (born 1978)

David William Hill
- Born: 31 July 1978 (age 48) Blenheim, New Zealand
- Height: 1.88 m (6 ft 2 in)
- Weight: 16 st 1 lb (102 kg)
- School: Marlborough Boys' College

Rugby union career
- Position: Fly-half/centre
Senior career
| Years | Team | Apps | (Points) |
| 2006–08 | Bristol Rugby | 33 | (130) |
| 2008–09, 2011– | Toshiba Brave Lupus | | |
- Correct as of 21 March 2009
Provincial / State sides
| Years | Team | Apps | (Points) |
| 1997-99 | Marlborough | 33 | |
| 2000 | Southland | | |
| 2001-06 | Waikato | 60 | |
Super Rugby
| Years | Team | Apps | (Points) |
| 2001–06 | Chiefs | 58 | |
| 2010 | Western Force | | |
International career
| Years | Team | Apps | (Points) |
| 2006 | New Zealand | 1 | (0) |
- Correct as of 17 August 2007

David William Hill (born 31 July 1978 in Blenheim, New Zealand) is a rugby union player. His position is fly-half. He spent most of his career playing for Waikato and the Chiefs. He also played for the All Blacks between 2001 and 2006, in which he has played 1 test and 2 games.

In November 2006 he started playing for the Bristol Rugby club in the Guinness Premiership, and on 14 March 2008 announced that he would leave the English club for a move to Toshiba Brave Lupus, a Japanese club, with other former Chiefs and Waikato player Steven Bates. In 2010 he signed with the Western Force with whom he spent one season.

He is the cousin of former New Zealand cricket captain Daniel Vettori.

Currently, Hill resides in Fuchu, Japan with Top League team Toshiba Brave Lupus under Australian coach Joe Barakat, with other New Zealand players Richard Kahui and Steven Bates.
