= Justin Collins (rugby union) =

New Zealand rugby union player

- Born: April 9, 1974 (age 52) Tasmania
- Height: 1.94 m (6 ft 4 in)
- Weight: 101 kg (15 st 13 lb)
- School: Kamo High School
- Notable relative: Nick Collins (brother)

Rugby union career
- Position: Flanker
Youth career
- -: Kamo High School First XV
Senior career
| Years | Team | Apps | (Points) |
| – | Northland | 114 | |
| 1998–1999 | Chiefs | 10 | |
| 1999–2009 | Blues | 92 | (35) |

Justin Collins (born 1974, also known as Gus) is an Australian born, New Zealand former rugby union player. His usual position was flanker.

Collins was born in Tasmania in 1974 and moved to Whangārei in 1984. He started playing rugby for Kamo High School, before progressing to Whangārei club rugby and then provincial rugby for Northland, for whom he made 114 appearances.

He was selected for the Chiefs in Super Rugby in 1998. The following year the territories of the Chiefs and the Blues switched, and Collins made his Blues debut against the Highlanders. He made 92 appearances for the Blues, scoring seven tries and 35 points, before retiring in 2009 due to series of concussions.

After his playing career he joined the board of the New Zealand Rugby Players Association, his work for which was recognised with the Kirk Award in 2016.

== Personal life ==
Collins has been married since 2004, and has two daughters born 2002 and 2004.
