= Keith Lowen =

NZ international rugby union player

- Born: Keith Ross Lowen; 14 July 1974 (age 52) Huntly, New Zealand
- Height: 1.80 m (5 ft 11 in)
- Weight: 102 kg (225 lb)
- School: Huntly College; St Peter's School
- Occupation: Waste management

Rugby union career
- Position: Second five-eighth
Senior career
Years	Team	Apps	(Points)
2006–08	NEC Green Rockets		
Provincial / State sides
Years	Team	Apps	(Points)
1996	Bay of Plenty	4	
1998–2005	Waikato	83	
Super Rugby
Years	Team	Apps	(Points)
1999	Auckland Blues	5	
2000–05	Chiefs	55	
2006	Cheetahs		
International career
Years	Team	Apps	(Points)
2002	New Zealand	1	(0)

Keith Ross Lowen (born 14 July 1974) is a former New Zealand rugby union player. A second five-eighth, Lowen represented Waikato at a provincial level for most of his career, and was a member of the New Zealand national side, the All Blacks, in 2002. He played one international for the All Blacks against England. Lowen scored a hat-trick for the Chiefs against the Blues in a Super 12 match in 2001.
