= Steven Bates =

New Zealand rugby union footballer (born 1980

- Full name: Steven Paul Bates
- Born: 16 January 1980 (age 46) Auckland, New Zealand
- Height: 193 cm (6 ft 4 in)
- Weight: 110 kg (243 lb; 17 st 5 lb)
- School: Kelston Boys' High School
- Notable relative: Michael Bates (brother)

Rugby union career
- Position(s): Flanker, Number 8
Senior career
Years	Team	Apps	(Points)
2000–2001	Auckland	8	(0)
2002–2007	Chiefs	57	(35)
2002–2007	Waikato	75	(95)
2008–2016	Toshiba Brave Lupus	119	(290)
- Correct as of 28 May 2020
International career
Years	Team	Apps	(Points)
2001	New Zealand U21	4	(0)
2004	New Zealand	2	(0)
2005–2006	Junior All Blacks	7	(10)
- Correct as of 28 May 2020

Steven Paul Bates (born 16 January 1980 in Auckland, New Zealand) is a New Zealand rugby union footballer, whose usual position is at Number 8. He played for Waikato at provincial level and the Chiefs in the Super 14. Bates made the traditional All Blacks route to the top with appearances for New Zealand Secondary Schools, New Zealand U-19 and the U-21s, during this time he played Rugby league and was good enough to be selected for the Warriors U-19s. He played his first test for his nation (v Italy 2004).

He played in the Top League team Toshiba Brave Lupus under Australian coach Joe Barakat, with other New Zealand players Richard Kahui and David Hill.
