= 1997 Super 12 season =

Men's rugby union club competition

1997 Super 12
- Countries: Australia; South Africa; New Zealand
- Tournament format(s): Round-robin and knockout
- Champions: (New Zealand) Auckland Blues (2nd title)
- Matches played: 69
- Top point scorer(s): (South Africa) Gavin Lawless (170) (Sharks)
- Top try scorer(s): (Australia) Joe Roff (15) (ACT Brumbies)

The 1997 Super 12 season was the second season of the Super 12, contested by rugby union teams from Australia, New Zealand and South Africa. The season ran from 28 February to 31 May 1997, with each team playing all the others once. At the end of the regular season, the top four teams entered the play-off semi-finals, with the first-placed team playing the fourth and the second-placed team playing the third. The winner of each semi-final qualified for the final, which was contested by the Auckland Blues and the ACT Brumbies at Eden Park, Auckland. The Blues won 23–7 to win their second Super 12 title.

While the three Australian and five New Zealand teams remained the same as the 1996 season, the South African teams made changes. Transvaal, after the changes of the political landscape of South Africa, became known as the Gauteng Lions, while Western Province, after not making the top four of the 1996 Currie Cup, were replaced by Free State of Bloemfontein.

== Table ==
Top four teams advance to playoffs

Pos.	Team	Pld	W	D	L	PF	PA	PD	BP	Pts
1	(New Zealand) Auckland Blues	11	10	1	0	435	283	152	8	50
2	(Australia) ACT Brumbies	11	8	0	3	406	291	115	9	41
3	(New Zealand) Wellington Hurricanes	11	6	0	5	416	314	102	10	34
4	(South Africa) Sharks	11	5	2	4	321	350	−29	6	30
5	(South Africa) Gauteng Lions	11	5	1	5	302	346	−44	6	28
6	(New Zealand) Canterbury Crusaders	11	5	1	5	272	235	37	4	26
7	(South Africa) Free State	11	5	0	6	301	327	−26	5	25
8	(South Africa) Northern Transvaal	11	3	3	5	264	342	−78	4	22
9	(Australia) NSW Waratahs	11	4	0	7	255	296	−41	4	20
10	(Australia) Queensland Reds	11	4	0	7	263	318	−55	4	20
11	(New Zealand) Waikato Chiefs	11	4	0	7	272	295	−23	3	19
12	(New Zealand) Otago Highlanders	11	3	0	8	299	409	−110	5	17

Points breakdown:

- 4 points for a win
- 2 points for a draw
- 1 bonus point for a loss by seven points or less
- 1 bonus point for scoring four or more tries in a match

The playoffs follow a 1 v 4, 2 v 3 system with the highest placed team at home

== Regular season ==
=== Round 1 ===
28 February 1997	Wellington Hurricanes (New Zealand)	18–23	(New Zealand) Waikato Chiefs	The Showgrounds, Palmerston North
	Try: Jarrod Cunningham; Tana Umaga; Con: Jon Preston; Pen: Jon Preston (2)	Scoreboard	Try: Eric Rush; Glen Osborne; Walter Little; Con: Matthew Cooper; Pen: Matthew Cooper (2)	Referee: Colin Hawke (New Zealand)

1 March 1997	Queensland Reds (Australia)	19–24	(Australia) ACT Brumbies	Ballymore Stadium, Brisbane
	Try: Tim Horan (2); Barry Lea; Con: John Eales (2)	Scoreboard	Try: Adam Magro; Pat Howard; Stephen Larkham; Con: David Knox (3); Pen: David Knox	Attendance: 15,100; Referee: Peter Marshall (Australia)

1 March 1997	Northern Transvaal (South Africa)	40–40	(New Zealand) Auckland Blues	Loftus Versfeld, Pretoria
	Try: Adriaan Richter (3); Henry Tromp; Con: Theo Van Rensburg (4); Pen: Theo Van Rensburg (4)	Scoreboard	Try: Brian Lima (2); Carlos Spencer (2); Adrian Cashmore; Con: Adrian Cashmore (3); Pen: Adrian Cashmore (3)	Attendance: 20,000; Referee: André Watson (South Africa)

2 March 1997	Free State (South Africa)	20–24	(South Africa) Gauteng Lions	Free State Stadium, Bloemfontein
	Try: André Venter; Stephen Brink; Con: MJ Smith; Pen: MJ Smith	Scoreboard	Try: Gavin Johnson; Hannes Strydom; Con: Gavin Johnson; Pen: Gavin Johnson; Johan Roux (3)

=== Round 2 ===
7 March 1997	Free State (South Africa)	15–24	(New Zealand) Auckland Blues	Free State Stadium, Bloemfontein
	Pen: Jannie de Beer	Scoreboard	Try: Joeli Vidiri; Ofisa Tonu'u; Con: Adrian Cashmore; Pen: Adrian Cashmore (4)	Referee: Tappe Henning (South Africa)

7 March 1997	Canterbury Crusaders (New Zealand)	19–17	(New Zealand) Wellington Hurricanes	Lancaster Park, Christchurch
	Try: James Kerr; Con: Daryl Lilley; Pen: Daryl Lilley (4)	Scoreboard	Try: Alama Ieremia; Jon Preston; Con: Jon Preston (2); Pen: Jon Preston	Referee: Paddy O'Brien (New Zealand)

8 March 1997	NSW Waratahs (Australia)	26–33	(New Zealand) Waikato Chiefs	Sydney Football Stadium, Sydney
	Try: Matt Burke; Richard Harry; Con: Matt Burke (2); Pen: Matt Burke (4)	Scoreboard	Try: Eric Rush (2); Errol Brain; Con: Matthew Cooper (3); Pen: Matthew Cooper (4)	Referee: Andrew Cole (Australia)

8 March 1997	Sharks (South Africa)	75–43	(New Zealand) Otago Highlanders	Kings Park Stadium, Durban
	Try: Gavin Lawless (4); Jozuzi Joubert (2); Henry Honiball; Jeremy Thomson; John Allan; Con: Gavin Lawless (9); Pen: Gavin Lawless (4)	Scoreboard	Try: Jeff Wilson; Kees Meeuws; Lio Falaniko; Manassa Bari; Romi Ropati; Tony Brown; Con: Tony Brown (5); Pen: Tony Brown	Referee: André Watson (South Africa)

8 March 1997	Northern Transvaal (South Africa)	14–3	(Australia) Queensland Reds	Loftus Versfeld, Pretoria
	Try: Joost Van der Westhuizen (2); Con: Theo Van Rensburg (2)	Scoreboard	Pen: John Eales	Attendance: 15,000; Referee: Ian Rogers (South Africa)

9 March 1997	Gauteng Lions (South Africa)	44–36	(Australia) ACT Brumbies	Ellis Park, Johannesburg
	Try: Hennie le Roux; Ian McDonald; Japie Mulder; Joe Gillingham; Johan Roux; Con: Gavin Johnson (5); Pen: Gavin Johnson (3)	Scoreboard	Try: Stephen Larkham (2); George Gregan; Joe Roff; Pat Howard; Con: David Knox (4); Pen: David Knox	Attendance: 12,000

=== Round 3 ===
14 March 1997	Gauteng Lions (South Africa)	47–29	(New Zealand) Otago Highlanders	Ellis Park, Johannesburg
	Try: Andre Vos; Gavin Johnson (2); Jannie van der Walt; Kobus Wiese; Con: Gavin Johnson (5); Pen: Gavin Johnson (4)		Try: Jeff Wilson; Manassa Bari; Romi Ropati; Taine Randell; Con: Tony Brown (3); Pen: Tony Brown	Referee: Tappe Henning (South Africa)

14 March 1997	NSW Waratahs (Australia)	25–8	(New Zealand) Canterbury Crusaders	Sydney Football Stadium, Sydney
	Try: Daniel Manu (2); Pen: Matt Burke (5)		Try: Daryl Lilley; Pen: Daryl Lilley	Attendance: 22,000

15 March 1997	Free State (South Africa)	35–24	(Australia) Queensland Reds	Free State Stadium, Bloemfontein
	Try: Charl van Rensburg; Jan-Harm van Wyk; Werner Swanepoel; Con: Jannie de Beer; Pen: Jannie de Beer (5); Drop: Jannie de Beer		Try: Dan Crowley; Jason Little; Shane Drahm; Con: John Eales (3); Drop: Shane Drahm	Referee: Carl Spannenberg (South Africa)

15 March 1997	Waikato Chiefs (New Zealand)	16–26	(New Zealand) Auckland Blues	North Harbour Stadium, Albany
	Try: Scott McLeod; Con: Bruce Reihana; Pen: Bruce Reihana (2); Matt Cooper		Try: Joeli Vidiri; Zinzan Brooke; Penalty try Con: Carlos Spencer; Pen: Carlos Spencer (2); Drop: Carlos Spencer	Attendance: 25,000; Referee: Paddy O'Brien (New Zealand)

16 March 1997	Sharks (South Africa)	35–26	(Australia) ACT Brumbies	ABSA Stadium, Durban
	Try: Joos Joubert (3); Walter Minnaar; Con: Gavin Lawless (3); Pen: Gavin Lawless (3)		Try: Joe Roff; John Langford; Marco Caputo; Stephen Larkham; Con: Joe Roff (3)	Referee: Johann Meuwesen (South Africa)

16 March 1997	Wellington Hurricanes (New Zealand)	64–32	(South Africa) Northern Transvaal	Yarrow Stadium, New Plymouth
	Try: Finau Maka; Mark Allen; Martin Leslie (2); Norm Hewitt; Tana Umaga (3); Con: Jarrod Cunningham; Jon Preston (5); Pen: Jon Preston (4)		Try: Penalty try FA Meiring; Johan Otto; Schutte Bekker; Con: Theo van Rensburg (3); Pen: Theo van Rensburg (2)	Referee: Paul Honiss (New Zealand)

=== Round 4 ===
22 March 1997	Otago Highlanders (New Zealand)	27–7	(South Africa) Northern Transvaal	Carisbrook, Dunedin
	Try: Jeff Wilson; Pailate Fili; Con: Simon Culhane; Pen: Simon Culhane (5)		Try: Ruben Kruger; Con: Dirkie Nortje	Referee: Steve Walsh (New Zealand)

22 March 1997	Gauteng Lions (South Africa)	36–27	(Australia) NSW Waratahs	Ellis Park, Johannesburg
	Try: Gavin Johnson; Johan Roux; Kobus Wiese; Con: Gavin Johnson (3); Pen: Gavin Johnson (5)		Try: Alistair Murdoch; Fili Finau; Stuart Pinkerton; Con: Matt Burke (3); Pen: Matt Burke (2)	Attendance: 22,636; Referee: André Watson (South Africa)

22 March 1997	Waikato Chiefs (New Zealand)	31–16	(Australia) Queensland Reds	Waikato Stadium, Hamilton
	Try: Bruce Reihana; Dion Matthews; Matt Cooper; Con: Matt Cooper (2); Pen: Matt Cooper (4)		Try: Ben Tune; Con: John Eales; Pen: John Eales (3)	Referee: Colin Hawke (New Zealand)

22 March 1997	ACT Brumbies (Australia)	49–29	(New Zealand) Canterbury Crusaders	Canberra Stadium, Canberra
	Try: George Gregan; Ipolito Fenukitau (3); John Langford; Mitch Hardy; Con: David Knox (2); Pen: David Knox (4); Drop: David Knox		Try: James Kerr; Paula Bale; Scott Robertson; Tabai Matson (2); Con: Leon MacDonald (2)

22 March 1997	Free State (South Africa)	45–40	(South Africa) Sharks	Free State Stadium, Bloemfontein
	Try: Chris Badenhorst; Jaco Coetzee; Wybrand Els; Con: Jannie de Beer (2); MJ Smith; Pen: Hendrik Jordaan Kruger; MJ Smith (7)		Try: Dirkie Strydom; Gary Teichmann; John Allan; Ollie Le Roux; Wayne Fyvie; Con: Gavin Lawless (3); Pen: Gavin Lawless (3)	Referee: (England) Andy Turner

=== Round 5 ===
28 March 1997	ACT Brumbies (Australia)	38–19	(South Africa) Northern Transvaal	Canberra Stadium, Canberra
	Try: Joe Roff (3); Mitch Hardy; Troy Coker; Con: David Knox (2); Pen: David Knox (3)		Try: Jacques Olivier; Jannie Brooks; Kosie Jansen van Vuuren; Con: Theo van Rensburg	Attendance: 12,032; Referee: Andrew Cole (Australia)

29 March 1997	Canterbury Crusaders (New Zealand)	24–15	(New Zealand) Waikato Chiefs	Fraser Park, Timaru
	Try: Daryl Gibson; Kevin Nepia; Con: Andrew Mehrtens; Pen: Andrew Mehrtens (3); Drop: Andrew Mehrtens		Try: Paul Mitchell; Rhys Duggan; Con: Matt Cooper; Pen: Matt Cooper	Attendance: 8,500; Referee: Glen Wahlstrom (New Zealand)

29 March 1997	Gauteng Lions (South Africa)	35–37	(New Zealand) Wellington Hurricanes	Ellis Park, Johannesburg
	Try: Dawie du Toit; Japie Mulder; Joe Gillingham; Piet Krause; Con: Gavin Johnson (3); Pen: Gavin Johnson (3)		Try: Christian Cullen (2); Jason O'Halloran; Con: Jon Preston (2); Pen: Jon Preston (6)	Attendance: 20,000; Referee: Jonathan Kaplan (South Africa)

29 March 1997	Sharks (South Africa)	28–23	(Australia) NSW Waratahs	ABSA Stadium, Durban
	Try: Kevin Putt; Con: Gavin Lawless; Pen: Gavin Lawless (7)		Try: David Campese; Richard Tombs; Con: Matt Burke (2); Pen: Matt Burke (3)	Attendance: 39,300; Referee: Tappe Henning (South Africa)

30 March 1997	Otago Highlanders (New Zealand)	18–49	(South Africa) Free State	Rugby Park Stadium, Invercargill
	Pen: Simon Culhane (6)		Try: Chris Badenhorst (2); Naka Drotské (2); Os du Randt; Rassie Erasmus; Wybrand Els; Con: Jannie de Beer (7)	Referee: Colin Hawke (New Zealand)

31 March 1997	Auckland Blues (New Zealand)	49–26	(Australia) Queensland Reds	Eden Park, Auckland
	Try: Andrew Blowers (2); Brian Lima (2); Carlos Spencer; Joeli Vidiri; Con: Adrian Cashmore (4); Carlos Spencer; Pen: Adrian Cashmore (3)		Try: Jason Little; Matthew Pini; Con: John Eales (2); Pen: John Eales (4)	Attendance: 33,000; Referee: Paddy O'Brien (South Africa)

=== Round 6 ===
4 April 1997	Sharks (South Africa)	29–24	(New Zealand) Wellington Hurricanes	ABSA Stadium, Durban
	Try: Penalty try Geoff Appleford; Con: Gavin Lawless (2); Pen: Gavin Lawless (5)		Try: Norm Hewitt; Stephen Bachop; Tana Umaga; Con: Jon Preston (3); Pen: Jon Preston	Attendance: 40,303; Referee: André Watson (South Africa)

4 April 1997	ACT Brumbies (Australia)	50–23	(South Africa) Free State	Canberra Stadium, Canberra
	Try: Brett Robinson; James Holbeck; Joe Roff (2); Mitch Hardy; Stephen Larkham; Con: David Knox (4); Pen: David Knox (4)		Try: Penalty try Naka Drotské; Stephen Brink; Con: Jannie de Beer; Pen: Jannie de Beer (2)	Attendance: 14,196; Referee: Wayne Erickson (Australia)

4 April 1997	Auckland Blues (New Zealand)	29–28	(New Zealand) Canterbury Crusaders	Growers Stadium, Pukekohe
	Try: Joeli Vidiri; Robin Brooke; Con: Adrian Cashmore (2); Pen: Adrian Cashmore (5)		Try: Daryl Gibson; Daryl Lilley; Kevin Nepia; Con: Andrew Mehrtens (2); Pen: Andrew Mehrtens (3)	Referee: Steve Walsh (New Zealand)

5 April 1997	Queensland Reds (Australia)	37–24	(New Zealand) Otago Highlanders	Ballymore Stadium, Brisbane
	Try: Ben Tune; Elton Flatley; Jason Little; Matt Cockbain; Con: John Eales (4); Pen: John Eales (3)		Try: Penalty try Jeff Wilson; Matt Carrington; Con: Simon Culhane (3); Pen: Simon Culhane	Attendance: 15,000; Referee: Stuart Dickinson (Australia)

6 April 1997	NSW Waratahs (Australia)	43–29	(South Africa) Northern Transvaal	Sydney Football Stadium, Sydney
	Try: Fili Finau; Graeme Bond; Matt Burke (3); Con: Matt Burke (3); Pen: Matt Burke (4)		Try: André Snyman (2); Graeme Bouwer; Henry Tromp; Kosie Alberts; Con: Graeme Bouwer; Kosie Alberts	Attendance: 26,245; Referee: Andrew Cole (Australia)

=== Round 7 ===
11 April 1997	Waikato Chiefs (New Zealand)	15–33	(South Africa) Sharks	North Harbour Stadium, Albany
	Try: Glen Osborne; Glenn Taylor; Con: Blair Feeney; Pen: Blair Feeney		Try: Adrian Garvey (2); Cabous van der Westhuisen; Con: Gavin Lawless (3); Pen: Gavin Lawless (4)	Referee: Paddy O'Brien (New Zealand)

12 April 1997	Queensland Reds (Australia)	29–47	(New Zealand) Wellington Hurricanes	Ballymore Stadium, Brisbane
	Try: Tim Horan; Willie Carne; Con: John Eales (2); Pen: John Eales (5)		Try: Alex Telea (2); Jason O'Halloran; Jon Preston; Stephen Bachop; Tana Umaga; Con: Jon Preston (4); Pen: Jon Preston (3)	Attendance: 15,196; Referee: Stuart Dickinson (Australia)

12 April 1997	Gauteng Lions (South Africa)	16–16	(South Africa) Northern Transvaal	Ellis Park, Johannesburg
	Try: Hennie le Roux; Con: Johan Roux; Pen: Gavin Johnson; Johan Roux (2)		Try: Graeme Bouwer; Jacques Olivier; Pen: Casper Steyn; Graeme Bouwer	Attendance: 34,370; Referee: Johann Meuwesen (South Africa)

12 April 1997	Otago Highlanders (New Zealand)	37–29	(New Zealand) Canterbury Crusaders	Carisbrook, Dunedin
	Try: Anton Oliver; Manassa Bari (2); Con: Tony Brown (2); Pen: Tony Brown (5); Drop: Tony Brown		Try: Daryl Lilley; Leon MacDonald; Con: Andrew Mehrtens (2); Pen: Andrew Mehrtens (5)	Referee: Steve Walsh (New Zealand)

12 April 1997	NSW Waratahs (Australia)	36–11	(South Africa) Free State	Sydney Football Stadium, Sydney
	Try: Alistair Murdoch; David Campese; Michael Brial; Richard Tombs; Sam Payne; Con: Matt Burke (4); Pen: Matt Burke		Try: Stephen Brink; Pen: MJ Smith (2)	Attendance: 22,016; Referee: Mick Keogh (Australia)

12 April 1997	Auckland Blues (New Zealand)	41–29	(Australia) ACT Brumbies	Growers Stadium, Pukekohe
	Try: Adrian Cashmore; Brian Lima; Eroni Clarke (2); Lee Stensness; Leo Lafaiali'i; Con: Adrian Cashmore (3); Carlos Spencer; Pen: Adrian Cashmore		Try: James Holbeck; Joe Roff; Stephen Larkham; Troy Coker; Con: David Knox; Joe Roff; Stephen Larkham; Pen: David Knox	Referee: Colin Hawke (New Zealand)

=== Round 8 ===
18 April 1997	Otago Highlanders (New Zealand)	9–15	(Australia) ACT Brumbies	Rugby Park Stadium, Invercargill
	Pen: Tony Brown (3)		Try: George Gregan; Owen Finegan; Con: David Knox; Pen: David Knox	Referee: Glenn Wahlstrom (New Zealand)

19 April 1997	Auckland Blues (New Zealand)	63–22	(South Africa) Gauteng Lions	Eden Park, Auckland
	Try: Carlos Spencer; Dylan Mika; Jeremy Stanley; Joeli Vidiri; Michael Jones; Ofisa Tonu'u (2); Leo Lafaiali'i; Zinzan Brooke (2); Con: Carlos Spencer (5); Pen: Carlos Spencer		Try: Japie Mulder; Johan Roux; Warren Brosnihan; Con: Johan Roux (2); Pen: Johan Roux	Referee: Colin Hawke (New Zealand)

19 April 1997	Northern Transvaal (South Africa)	34–27	(New Zealand) Waikato Chiefs	Loftus Versfeld, Pretoria
	Try: Graeme Bouwer; Jacques Olivier (2); Nicky van der Walt; Con: Casper Steyn (4); Pen: Casper Steyn (2)		Try: Dean Anglesey; Glen Osborne; Con: Matt Cooper; Pen: Matt Cooper (5)	Referee: Ian Rogers (South Africa)

19 April 1997	Canterbury Crusaders (New Zealand)	26–26	(South Africa) Sharks	Jade Stadium, Christchurch
	Try: Penalty try Mark Mayerhofler; Con: Andrew Mehrtens (2); Pen: Andrew Mehrtens (4)		Try: Henry Honiball; Mark Andrews; Pieter Muller; Wikus van Heerden; Con: Henry Honiball (3)	Referee: Paddy O'Brien (New Zealand)

19 April 1997	NSW Waratahs (Australia)	16–26	(Australia) Queensland Reds	Sydney Football Stadium, Sydney
	Try: Penalty try Con: Matt Burke; Pen: Matt Burke (3)		Try: Ben Tune; Damien Smith; Mark Connors; Con: John Eales; Pen: John Eales (3)	Attendance: 30,106; Referee: Wayne Erickson (New Zealand)

20 April 1997	Wellington Hurricanes (New Zealand)	59–30	(South Africa) Free State	Athletic Park, Wellington
	Try: Penalty try Christian Cullen (3); Jason O'Halloran; Mark Cooksley; Martin Leslie; Tana Umaga; Con: Jarrod Cunningham; Jon Preston (4); Pen: Jon Preston (3)		Try: Charl van Rensburg; Os du Randt; Stephen Brink; Con: Jannie de Beer (3); Pen: Jannie de Beer (3)	Attendance: 25,000; Referee: Paul Honiss (New Zealand)

=== Round 9 ===
25 April 1997	Canterbury Crusaders (New Zealand)	23–0	(South Africa) Gauteng Lions	Jade Stadium, Christchurch
	Try: Afato So'oalo; Andrew Mehrtens; Todd Blackadder; Con: Andrew Mehrtens; Pen: Andrew Mehrtens (2)			Referee: Glenn Wahlstrom (New Zealand)

26 April 1997	ACT Brumbies (Australia)	56–9	(Australia) NSW Waratahs	Canberra Stadium, Canberra
	Try: David Knox; George Gregan; Joe Roff (3); Mitch Hardy (2); Patricio Noriega; Con: David Knox (5); Pen: David Knox (2)		Pen: Matt Burke (3)	Attendance: 18,753; Referee: Andrew Cole (New Zealand)

26 April 1997	Wellington Hurricanes (New Zealand)	60–34	(New Zealand) Otago Highlanders	Athletic Park, Wellington
	Try: Alex Telea (2); Christian Cullen; Filo Tiatia; Jason O'Halloran (2); Tana Umaga (3); Con: Christian Cullen (6); Pen: Christian Cullen		Try: Ace Tiatia; Brett McCormack; Josh Kronfeld; Kupu Vanisi; Matt Carrington; Con: Tony Brown (3); Pen: Tony Brown	Referee: Colin Hawke (New Zealand)

26 April 1997	Free State (South Africa)	27–13	(New Zealand) Waikato Chiefs	Free State Stadium, Bloemfontein
	Try: Hendrik Jordaan Kruger; Jan-Harm van Wyk; Rassie Erasmus; Wybrand Els; Con: MJ Smith (2); Pen: MJ Smith		Try: Michael Collins; Con: Matt Cooper; Pen: Matt Cooper (2)	Referee: Tappe Henning (South Africa)

27 April 1997	Auckland Blues (New Zealand)	39–17	(South Africa) Sharks	Eden Park, Auckland
	Try: Penalty try Carlos Spencer; Joeli Vidiri; Ofisa Tonu'u; Sean Fitzpatrick; Con: Carlos Spencer (4); Pen: Carlos Spencer (2)		Try: John Slade; Kevin Putt; Con: Gavin Lawless (2); Pen: Gavin Lawless	Referee: Paddy O'Brien (New Zealand)

=== Round 10 ===
2 May 1997	Wellington Hurricanes (New Zealand)	19–3	(Australia) NSW Waratahs	McLean Park, Napier
	Try: Christian Cullen; Jason O'Halloran; Martin Leslie; Con: Christian Cullen (2)		Pen: Matt Burke	Referee: Glenn Wahlstrom (New Zealand)

3 May 1997	Northern Transvaal (South Africa)	23–22	(New Zealand) Canterbury Crusaders	Loftus Versfeld, Pretoria
	Try: Boeta Wessels; Johan Schutte; Con: Casper Steyn (2); Pen: Casper Steyn (3)		Try: Afato So'oalo (2); Steve Surridge; Con: Daryl Lilley (2); Pen: Andrew Mehrtens	Referee: Jonathan Kaplan (South Africa)

3 May 1997	Otago Highlanders (New Zealand)	28–45	(New Zealand) Auckland Blues	Carisbrook, Dunedin
	Try: Anton Oliver; Josh Kronfeld; Romi Ropati; Taine Randall; Con: TOny Brown; Pen: Brendan Laney; Tony Brown		Try: Jeremy Stanley (2); Joeli Vidiri; Lee Stensness; Ofisa Tonu'u; Robin Brooke (2); Con: Adrian Cashmore; Carlos Spencer (4)	Attendance: 11,500; Referee: Steve Walsh (New Zealand)

3 May 1997	Queensland Reds (Australia)	40–3	(South Africa) Sharks	Ballymore Stadium, Brisbane
	Try: Penalty try Ben Tune; David Wilson; Glen Panoho; Jason Little; John Eales; Con: John Eales (5)		Pen: Gavin Lawless	Attendance: 14,826; Referee: Wayne Erickson (Australia)

3 May 1997	Waikato Chiefs (New Zealand)	47–9	(South Africa) Gauteng Lions	Waikato Stadium, Hamilton
	Try: Caleb Ralph (2); Deon Muir; Scott McLeod; Con: Matt Cooper (5); Pen: Matt Cooper (4)		Pen: Gavin Johnson (3)	Referee: Paul Honiss (New Zealand)

=== Round 11 ===
9 May 1997	Otago Highlanders (New Zealand)	16–27	(Australia) NSW Waratahs	Carisbrook, Dunedin
	Try: Lio Falaniko; Con: Simon Culhane; Pen: Simon Culhane (3)		Try: Alistair Murdoch; Jason Madz; Michael Brial; Con: Matt Burke (3); Pen: Matt Burke (2)	Referee: Colin Hawke (New Zealand)

9 May 1997	ACT Brumbies (Australia)	48–34	(New Zealand) Waikato Chiefs	Canberra Stadium, Canberra
	Try: George Gregan; Joe Roff (2); Mitch Hardy; Owen Finegan; Stephen Larkham; Troy Coker; Con: David Knox (5); Pen: David Knox		Try: Aaron Hopa; Eric Rush (3); Con: Ian Foster (4); Pen: Matt Cooper (2)	Attendance: 13,742; Referee: Stuart Dickinson (Australia)

10 May 1997	Free State (South Africa)	11–16	(New Zealand) Canterbury Crusaders	Free State Stadium, Bloemfontein
	Try: Werner Swanepoel; Pen: MJ Smith (2)		Try: Daryl Lilley; Con: Daryl Lilley; Pen: Daryl Lilley (3)	Referee: Ian Rogers (South Africa)

10 May 1997	Queensland Reds (Australia)	40–27	(South Africa) Gauteng Lions	Ballymore Stadium, Brisbane
	Try: Damien Smith; Daniel Herbert; Jason Little; Scott Webster; Tim Horan; Con: John Eales (3); Pen: John Eales (3)		Try: Chris Rossouw (2); Jopie Adlam; Warren Brosnihan; Con: Dawie du Toit; Edrich Lubbe; Pen: Edrich Lubbe	Attendance: 13,846; Referee: Wayne Erickson (Australia)

10 May 1997	Auckland Blues (New Zealand)	45–42	(New Zealand) Wellington Hurricanes	Eden Park, Auckland
	Try: Carlos Spencer; Craig Dowd; Joeli Vidiri; Michael Jones; Zinzan Brooke; Con: Adrian Cashmore (3); Pen: Adrian Cashmore; Carlos Spencer (2)		Try: Finau Maka; Jarrod Cunningham; Bull Allen; Tana Umaga (2); Con: Jon Preston (4); Pen: Jon Preston (3)	Referee: Paul Honiss (New Zealand)

11 May 1997	Sharks (South Africa)	27–27	(South Africa) Northern Transvaal	ABSA Stadium, Durban
	Try: Adrian Garvey; Gavin Lawless (2); John Allan; Con: Gavin Lawless (2); Pen: Gavin Lawless		Try: André Snyman; Boeta Wessels; Johan Schutte; Con: Casper Steyn (3); Pen: Casper Steyn (2)	Attendance: 36,270; Referee: André Watson (South Africa)

=== Round 12 ===
16 May 1997	Waikato Chiefs (New Zealand)	18–34	(New Zealand) Otago Highlanders	Owen Delany Park, Taupō
	Try: Caleb Ralph; Glenn Taylor; Con: Blair Feeney; Pen: Ian Foster (2)		Try: Doug Howlett (3); Con: Simon Culhane (2); Pen: Simon Culhane (4); Tony Brown	Attendance: 10,000; Referee: Paul Honiss (New Zealand)

16 May 1997	Northern Transvaal (South Africa)	23–35	(South Africa) Free State	Loftus Versfeld, Pretoria
	Try: Kobus Engelbrecht; Matthys Bekker; Nicky van der Walt; Con: Casper Steyn; Pen: Casper Steyn (2)		Try: Andre Venter; Brendan Venter; Chris Badenhorst (2); Helgard Müller; Con: Jannie de Beer (5)	Attendance: 35,000; Referee: Johann Meuwesen (South Africa)

17 May 1997	NSW Waratahs (Australia)	20–34	(New Zealand) Auckland Blues	Sydney Football Stadium, Sydney
	Try: Alistair Murdoch (2); Con: Matt Burke (2); Pen: Matt Burke (2)		Try: Brian Lima (2); Dylan Mika; Zinzan Brooke; Con: Adrian Cashmore (4); Pen: Adrian Cashmore (2)	Attendance: 30,793; Referee: Andrew Cole (Australia)

17 May 1997	Canterbury Crusaders (New Zealand)	48–3	(Australia) Queensland Reds	Jade Stadium, Christchurch
	Try: Daryl Gibson; Justin Marshall; Mark Hammett; Mark Mayerhofler (2); Scott Robertson; Con: Andrew Mehrtens (2); Daryl Lilley; Pen: Andrew Mehrtens (3); Drop: Andrew Mehrtens		Pen: John Eales	Referee: Paddy O'Brien (New Zealand)

17 May 1997	Gauteng Lions (South Africa)	42–8	(South Africa) Sharks	Ellis Park, Johannesburg
	Try: Dawie du Toit (2); Jannie van der Walt; Joe Gillingham; Jopie Adlam; Con: Edrich Lubbe (4); Pen: Edrich Lubbe (3)		Try: Cabous van der Westhuizen; Pen: Gavin Lawless	Attendance: 36,260; Referee: Tappe Henning (South Africa)

18 May 1997	Wellington Hurricanes (New Zealand)	29–35	(Australia) ACT Brumbies	Athletic Park, Wellington
	Try: Christian Cullen (2); Filo Tiatia; Con: Jon Preston; Pen: Jon Preston (4)		Try: George Gregan; Joe Roff; Mitch Hardy (2); Troy Coker; Con: David Knox (2); Pen: David Knox (2)	Attendance: 30,400; Referee: Colin Hawke (New Zealand)

== Finals ==
Semi-finals
24 May – Auckland
Auckland Blues	55
Sharks	36
24 May – Canberra
ACT Brumbies	33
Wellington Hurricanes	20

Final
31 May – Auckland
Auckland Blues	23
ACT Brumbies	7

=== Semi finals ===
24 May 1997

Auckland Blues	55–36	Sharks
Try: Adrian Cashmore; Carlos Spencer; Eroni Clarke; Joeli Vidiri; Mark Carter; Zinzan Brooke; Con: Adrian Cashmore (6); Pen: Adrian Cashmore		Try: Errol Stewart; Henry Honiball; Joos Joubert; Lawrence Payne; Con: Henry Honiball (3)

Eden Park, Auckland
Referee: Wayne Erickson (Australia)

24 May 1997

ACT Brumbies	33–20	Wellington Hurricanes
Try: George Gregan; James Holbeck; Joe Roff; Mitch Hardy; Con: David Knox; Pen: David Knox (2)		Try: Christian Cullen (2); Con: Jon Preston (2); Pen: Jon Preston (2)

Canberra Stadium, Canberra
Attendance: 23,731
Referee: André Watson (South Africa)

=== Final ===
31 May 1997

Auckland Blues	23–7	ACT Brumbies
Try: Dowd; Jones; Con: Cashmore (2); Pen: Cashmore (3)		Try: Roff; Con: Roff

Eden Park, Auckland
Referee: Tappe Henning (South Africa)

15	Adrian Cashmore
14	Brian Lima
13	Eroni Clarke
12	Lee Stensness
11	Joeli Vidiri
10	Carlos Spencer
9	Ofisa Tonu'u
8	Zinzan Brooke (c)
7	Michael Jones
6	Mark Carter
5	Robin Brooke
4	Leo Lafaiali'i
3	Craig Dowd
2	Sean Fitzpatrick
1	Olo Brown
Substitutes:
16	Jeremy Stanley
17	Michael Scott
18	Dylan Mika
19	Charles Riechelmann
20	Paul Thomson
21	Andrew Roose
Coach:
Graham Henry

15	Stephen Larkham
14	Mitch Hardy
13	James Holbeck
12	Pat Howard
11	Joe Roff
10	David Knox
9	George Gregan
8	Troy Coker
7	Brett Robinson (c)
6	Owen Finegan
5	John Langford
4	David Giffin
3	Patricio Noriega
2	Marco Caputo
1	Ewen McKenzie
Substitutes:
16	Rod Kafer
17	Geoff Logan
18	Justin Harrison
19	Ipolito Fenukitau
20	Dean Zammit
21	Timote Tavalea
Coach:
Rod McQueen
