= List of ACT Brumbies players =

This is a list of rugby union footballers who have played for the ACT Brumbies in Super Rugby. The list includes any player that has played in a regular season match, semi-final or final for the Brumbies, ordered by debut date and name. The Brumbies were a foundation team in the 1996 Super 12 season, and have competed in Super Rugby AUS since 2025.

== Players ==
No.	Name	Caps	Tries	C	P	DG	Points	Debut	Last
1	Marco Caputo	43	3				15	5 March 1996	14 May 1999
2	Ipolito Fenukitau	55	12				60	5 March 1996	27 May 2000
3	Owen Finegan	91	28				140	5 March 1996	14 May 2005
4	David Giffin	80	4				20	5 March 1996	22 May 2004
5	George Gregan	136	21			4	117	5 March 1996	5 May 2007
6	Mitch Hardy	38	20				100	5 March 1996	20 May 2000
7	Rod Kafer	53	5			3	34	5 March 1996	26 May 2001
8	David Knox	29	1	55	42		241	5 March 1996	16 May 1998
9	John Langford	46	4				20	5 March 1996	14 May 1999
10	Stephen Larkham	117	33	14	6	5	226	5 March 1996	5 May 2007
11	Ewen McKenzie	23						5 March 1996	31 May 1997
12	Patricio Noriega	53	7				35	5 March 1996	27 May 2000
13	Joe Roff	85	57	98	35	1	589	5 March 1996	22 May 2004
14	John Ross	1						5 March 1996	5 March 1996
15	Craig Sweeny	7	1				5	5 March 1996	28 April 1996
16	Elisi Vunipola	2	1				5	5 March 1996	9 March 1996
17	Adam Friend	8		11	14		64	9 March 1996	28 April 1996
18	Andrew Williams	3	1				5	9 March 1996	12 May 1996
19	Troy Coker	23	5				25	15 March 1996	16 May 1998
20	Geoff Didier	3						15 March 1996	12 May 1996
21	James Holbeck	34	6				30	15 March 1996	20 April 2002
22	Liam O'Connor	7						15 March 1996	12 May 1996
23	Brett Robinson	43	2				10	15 March 1996	27 May 2000
24	Pat Howard	57	6				30	24 March 1996	17 May 2003
25	Timote Tavalea	2						3 April 1996	9 May 1997
26	Adam Magro	23	3				15	8 April 1996	25 April 1999
27	Paul Brown	1						12 May 1996	12 May 1996
28	Justin Harrison	72	1				5	1 March 1997	16 April 2010
29	Rod Moore	11						9 March 1997	14 May 1999
30	Geoff Logan	6						16 March 1997	31 May 1997
31	Dean Zammit	13						16 March 1997	16 May 1998
32	Troy Jaques	34	1				5	22 March 1997	27 May 2000
33	Omar Hasan	11						1 March 1998	16 May 1998
34	Stirling Mortlock	123	53	161	144		1019	1 March 1998	26 March 2010
35	Jeremy Paul	114	24				120	1 March 1998	5 May 2007
36	Sam Cordingley	7	3				15	6 March 1998	24 April 1998
37	Warwick Waugh	9						6 March 1998	6 May 2000
38	Mark Bartholomeusz	69	20				100	14 March 1998	22 May 2004
39	Craig McMullen	21	2				10	21 March 1998	11 May 2001
40	Bill Young	100	5				25	24 April 1998	12 May 2006
41	Brendan Williams	2						2 May 1998	10 April 1999
42	Josh Birch	2	1				5	8 May 1998	16 May 1998
43	Gordon Falcon	11	1				5	26 February 1999	14 May 1999
44	Jim Williams	35	6				30	26 February 1999	26 May 2001
45	Damian McInally	16	1				5	5 March 1999	17 May 2003
46	Craig Wells	2						19 March 1999	27 March 1999
47	Iliesa Tanivula	5	1				5	27 March 1999	14 May 1999
48	Graeme Bond	38	14				70	25 April 1999	25 May 2002
49	Andrew Walker	47	31	17	19		246	25 February 2000	9 May 2003
50	Ben Darwin	43						10 March 2000	17 May 2003
51	Travis Hall	21						10 March 2000	18 April 2003
52	Tom Murphy	14						10 March 2000	19 May 2001
53	George Smith	142	18				90	10 March 2000	3 August 2013
54	Simon Ross	2						1 April 2000	7 April 2000
55	Peter Ryan	28						21 April 2000	25 May 2002
56	Radike Samo	35	4				20	6 May 2000	12 May 2006
57	Angus Scott	12						12 May 2000	18 May 2002
58	David Pusey	23						23 February 2001	25 May 2002
59	Des Tuiavi'i	1						23 February 2001	23 February 2001
60	Dan Vickerman	32	1				5	3 March 2001	17 May 2003
61	Joel Wilson	51	8				40	10 March 2001	12 May 2006
62	Matt Weaver	6						6 April 2001	26 May 2001
63	Tim Atkinson	9	3				15	23 February 2002	26 April 2002
64	Scott Fava	46	6				30	23 February 2002	14 May 2005
65	Adam Freier	6						23 February 2002	14 April 2002
66	Scott Barton	1						8 March 2002	8 March 2002
67	Julian Huxley	26	3	16	29	1	137	26 April 2002	14 May 2010
68	Damian Flynn	2						4 May 2002	18 May 2002
69	Tamaiti Horua	31	5				25	10 May 2002	7 May 2005
70	David Fitter	15						22 February 2003	7 May 2005
71	Digby Beaumont	9						1 March 2003	17 May 2003
72	Mark Gerrard	79	27	39	30	1	306	1 March 2003	2 May 2009
73	Matt Giteau	67	23	58	72	2	453	1 March 2003	18 June 2011
74	Mark Chisholm	103	17				85	7 March 2003	4 June 2011
75	Matt Henjak	18	1				5	6 April 2003	14 May 2005
76	Lenny Beckett	10						17 May 2003	16 April 2005
77	Nic Henderson	70						21 February 2004	2 May 2009
78	David Palavi	22						21 February 2004	17 February 2006
79	Clyde Rathbone	63	18				90	21 February 2004	11 July 2014
80	Guy Shepherdson	70						21 February 2004	10 April 2010
81	Jone Tawake	31	1				5	9 April 2004	12 April 2008
82	Adam Ashley-Cooper	78	14				70	26 February 2005	18 June 2011
83	Alister Campbell	35	3				15	26 February 2005	16 May 2008
84	Gene Fairbanks	38	6				30	26 February 2005	9 May 2009
85	Sam Norton-Knight	9	2				10	26 February 2005	14 May 2005
86	Henari Veratau	6	2				10	4 March 2005	30 April 2005
87	Ben Batger	9	1				5	11 March 2005	29 April 2006
88	Peter Owens	1						11 March 2005	11 March 2005
89	Adam Wallace-Harrison	37	3				15	26 March 2005	9 May 2008
90	Luke Burgess	2						30 April 2005	7 May 2005
91	Julian Salvi	62	3				15	7 May 2005	18 June 2011
92	Patrick Phibbs	71	8				40	14 May 2005	18 June 2011
93	Daniel Heenan	13	1				5	10 February 2006	12 May 2006
94	James McCormack	10						17 February 2006	12 May 2006
95	Saia Fainga'a	30						24 February 2006	15 April 2017
96	John Ulugia	14						8 April 2006	5 March 2023
97	Matthew Carraro	4						3 February 2007	8 April 2007
98	Stephen Hoiles	49	6				30	3 February 2007	25 February 2011
99	Salesi Ma'afu	51	4				20	3 February 2007	14 May 2011
100	Richard Stanford	6						3 February 2007	31 March 2007
101	Tim Wright	4						3 February 2007	14 March 2008
102	Peter Playford	17	4				20	10 February 2007	19 April 2008
103	Anthony Fainga'a	4	1				5	3 March 2007	23 February 2008
104	Francis Fainifo	48	8				40	3 March 2007	18 June 2011
105	Peter Kimlin	78	6				30	9 March 2007	3 August 2013
106	Huia Edmonds	37	4				20	15 February 2008	14 May 2011
107	Josh Holmes	26	3				15	15 February 2008	15 May 2009
108	Christian Leali'ifano	149	20	195	155	2	961	15 February 2008	28 June 2019
109	Tyrone Smith	48	6				30	15 February 2008	18 June 2011
110	Mitchell Chapman	40	2				10	23 February 2008	18 June 2011
111	Leo Afeaki	6						1 March 2008	25 April 2008
112	Ben Alexander	153	21				105	1 March 2008	14 July 2018
113	Afusipa Taumoepeau	10						1 March 2008	15 May 2009
114	Matt To'omua	89	17	6		1	100	14 March 2008	22 July 2016
115	Ben Hand	43						13 February 2009	10 March 2012
116	Stephen Moore	117	16				80	13 February 2009	22 July 2016
117	Sitaleki Timani	8	1				5	20 February 2009	9 May 2009
118	Shawn Mackay	2						21 March 2009	28 March 2009
119	Alfie Mafi	7	1				5	28 March 2009	24 April 2010
120	James Stannard	3						25 April 2009	16 April 2010
121	Henry Vanderglas	6						25 April 2009	18 June 2011
122	Pat McCabe	66	10	1			52	12 February 2010	26 July 2014
123	Josh Valentine	25	4				20	12 February 2010	18 June 2011
124	Rocky Elsom	13	3				15	20 February 2010	21 May 2011
125	Andrew Smith	71	6				30	19 March 2010	3 June 2018
126	Jerry Yanuyanutawa	9						19 March 2010	18 June 2011
127	Colby Fainga'a	35	1				5	26 March 2010	21 July 2013
128	Michael Hooper	31	5				25	26 March 2010	14 July 2012
129	Ed Stubbs	2						10 April 2010	1 May 2010
130	Brackin Karauria-Henry	2						24 April 2010	1 May 2010
131	Robbie Coleman	77	17				85	19 February 2011	22 July 2016
132	Dan Palmer	32						19 February 2011	7 June 2013
133	Henry Speight	122	46				230	19 February 2011	28 June 2019
134	Ita Vaea	48	6				30	19 February 2011	2 April 2016
135	Anthony Hegarty	17	1				5	1 April 2011	30 June 2012
136	Elvis Levi	1						17 April 2011	17 April 2011
137	Jono Owen	8						29 April 2011	18 June 2011
138	Nic White	112	10	21	32		188	4 June 2011	17 June 2023
139	Thomas Boidin	2						10 June 2011	18 June 2011
140	Sam Carter	122	9				45	10 June 2011	28 June 2019
141	Scott Fardy	97	9				45	24 February 2012	21 July 2017
142	Jesse Mogg	69	21		17		156	24 February 2012	2 June 2023
143	Ben Mowen	51	6				30	24 February 2012	26 July 2014
144	Ruaidhrí Murphy	29	1				5	24 February 2012	26 July 2014
145	Leon Power	20	1				5	24 February 2012	26 July 2014
146	Joe Tomane	68	25				125	24 February 2012	24 April 2016
147	Ian Prior	25	1	5			15	10 March 2012	3 August 2013
148	Zack Holmes	10	3	3	21		79	16 March 2012	7 June 2013
149	Scott Sio	142	5				25	31 March 2012	11 June 2022
150	Tevita Kuridrani	136	29				145	6 April 2012	19 September 2020
151	Fotu Auelua	33	1				5	14 April 2012	26 July 2014
152	Cam Crawford	1						30 June 2012	30 June 2012
153	David Pocock	43	12				60	16 February 2013	8 March 2019
154	Siliva Siliva	16	1				5	16 February 2013	4 April 2014
155	Mark Swanepoel	2						23 March 2013	13 July 2013
156	Etienne Oosthuizen	3						30 March 2013	7 June 2013
157	Jordan Smiler	58	2				10	12 April 2013	21 July 2017
158	Ruan Smith	51						18 May 2013	22 July 2016
159	Joshua Mann-Rea	68	8				40	7 June 2013	20 April 2019
160	Jarrad Butler	60	5				25	22 February 2014	21 July 2017
161	Conrad Hoffmann	5						22 February 2014	23 May 2014
162	Lachlan McCaffrey	42	7				35	22 February 2014	19 September 2020
163	Lionel Cronjé	3						1 March 2014	28 June 2014
164	JP Smith	24						7 March 2014	16 May 2015
165	Jack Whetton	6						22 March 2014	28 June 2014
166	Tom Staniforth	22						11 April 2014	15 July 2017
167	Michael Dowsett	22	1				5	25 April 2014	28 May 2016
168	Tom McVerry	6	1				5	25 April 2014	26 July 2014
169	Luke Holmes	1						28 June 2014	28 June 2014
170	Rodney Iona	10						28 June 2014	28 May 2022
171	Allan Alaalatoa	152	13				65	19 July 2014	5 June 2026
172	Rory Arnold	73	9				45	13 February 2015	28 June 2019
173	James Dargaville	35	4				20	13 February 2015	14 April 2018
174	Lausii Taliauli	25	6				30	13 February 2015	24 March 2019
175	Sean Doyle	1						20 February 2015	20 February 2015
176	Blake Enever	49	1				5	28 February 2015	12 May 2019
177	Nigel Ah Wong	27	7				35	4 April 2015	15 July 2017
178	Joe Powell	73	9				45	18 April 2015	19 September 2020
179	Tomás Cubelli	18	3				15	26 February 2016	21 July 2017
180	Leslie Leuluaʻialiʻi-Makin	50						26 February 2016	28 June 2019
181	Aidan Toua	30	4				20	26 February 2016	7 July 2017
182	Michael Wells	7						19 March 2016	22 July 2016
183	Robbie Abel	24	3				15	26 March 2016	12 May 2018
184	Jordan Jackson-Hope	15	1				5	13 May 2016	15 June 2019
185	Ben Hyne	7						1 July 2016	7 August 2020
186	Chris Alcock	13	2				10	25 February 2017	21 July 2017
187	Lolo Fakaosilea	13						25 February 2017	12 May 2018
188	Kyle Godwin	24	6				30	25 February 2017	14 July 2018
189	Wharenui Hawera	36	2	42	32		190	25 February 2017	20 April 2019
190	Nic Mayhew	23						25 February 2017	14 July 2018
191	De Wet Roos	10						25 February 2017	3 June 2017
192	Isaac Thompson	1		1			2	4 March 2017	4 March 2017
193	Tom Banks	86	36	1			182	8 April 2017	11 June 2022
194	Tom Cusack	51	5				25	15 April 2017	5 June 2021
195	Andy Muirhead	123	39				195	20 May 2017	5 June 2026
196	Faalelei Sione	8	1				5	27 May 2017	12 May 2018
197	Ryan Lonergan	107	14	89	21		311	15 July 2017	5 June 2026
198	Richie Arnold	10	1				5	24 February 2018	14 July 2018
199	Matt Lucas	28	1	1			7	24 February 2018	28 June 2019
200	Isi Naisarani	15	5				25	24 February 2018	14 July 2018
201	Chance Peni	10	5				25	24 February 2018	8 March 2019
202	Rob Valetini	110	22				110	24 February 2018	5 June 2026
203	Folau Fainga'a	63	34				170	9 March 2018	11 June 2022
204	Connal McInerney	57	10				50	17 March 2018	1 June 2024
205	James Verity-Amm	1						7 April 2018	7 April 2018
206	Michael Oakman-Hunt	2						14 April 2018	22 April 2018
207	Mees Erasmus	1						22 April 2018	22 April 2018
208	Darcy Swain	76	2				10	22 April 2018	14 June 2024
209	Toni Pulu	14	2				10	15 February 2019	6 March 2020
210	Pete Samu	69	20				100	15 February 2019	17 June 2023
211	Irae Simone	60	13				65	15 February 2019	11 June 2022
212	James Slipper	108	5				25	15 February 2019	5 June 2026
213	Tom Wright	103	41		1		208	23 February 2019	5 June 2026
214	Murray Douglas	23	1				5	8 March 2019	19 September 2020
215	Mack Hansen	21	3		1		18	15 March 2019	11 June 2021
216	Tom Ross	31						15 March 2019	18 March 2023
217	Jahrome Brown	50	8				40	24 March 2019	14 June 2024
218	Vunipola Fifita	1						6 April 2019	6 April 2019
219	Len Ikitau	76	26				130	4 May 2019	14 June 2025
220	Solomone Kata	18	5				25	31 January 2020	11 June 2021
221	Harry Lloyd	17						31 January 2020	11 June 2021
222	Noah Lolesio	77	6	176	66	3	589	31 January 2020	14 June 2025
223	Will Miller	16	5				25	31 January 2020	18 April 2021
224	Cadeyrn Neville	73	4				20	31 January 2020	5 June 2026
225	Nick Frost	89	8				40	7 February 2020	5 June 2026
226	Bayley Kuenzle	18	2	14			38	7 February 2020	11 June 2021
227	Reesjan Pasitoa	11		1			2	15 February 2020	11 June 2021
228	Lachlan Lonergan	69	18				90	22 February 2020	5 June 2026
229	Issak Fines-Leleiwasa	11	3				15	4 July 2020	22 May 2021
230	James Tucker	6						6 March 2021	11 June 2021
231	Archer Holz	1						13 March 2021	13 March 2021
232	Fred Kaihea	9						26 March 2021	6 April 2024
233	Sefo Kautai	40	1				5	26 March 2021	14 June 2024
234	Rory Scott	62	4				20	26 March 2021	5 June 2026
235	Luke Reimer	73	18				90	1 May 2021	5 June 2026
236	Henry Stowers	6						8 May 2021	11 June 2021
237	Tom Hooper	53	1				5	15 May 2021	14 June 2025
238	Billy Pollard	56	20				100	11 June 2021	5 June 2026
239	Ed Kennedy	7						20 February 2022	28 May 2022
240	Ollie Sapsford	64	8				40	20 February 2022	5 June 2026
241	Chris Feauai-Sautia	3						26 February 2022	11 March 2022
242	Hudson Creighton	30	5				25	25 March 2022	5 June 2026
243	Lachie Albert	1						25 March 2022	25 March 2022
244	Cam Clark	3	2				10	2 April 2022	24 April 2022
245	Jack Debreczeni	28	2	16	2		48	24 February 2023	14 June 2025
246	Blake Schoupp	44						24 February 2023	5 June 2026
247	Corey Toole	56	34				170	24 February 2023	5 June 2026
248	Tamati Tua	29	4				20	24 February 2023	14 June 2024
249	Rhys van Nek	44	4				20	24 February 2023	5 June 2026
250	Ben O'Donnell	9	5				25	11 March 2023	18 May 2024
251	Charlie Cale	27	17				85	18 March 2023	5 June 2026
252	Jack Wright	3						18 March 2023	20 May 2023
253	Declan Meredith	33	7	8	2		57	24 March 2023	5 June 2026
254	Pedro Rolando	1						24 March 2023	24 March 2023
255	Sam Thomson	1						14 April 2023	14 April 2023
256	Klayton Thorn	18						20 May 2023	5 June 2026
257	Harrison Goddard	26	1				5	3 March 2024	14 June 2025
258	Lachlan Shaw	31	5				25	9 March 2024	5 June 2026
259	Harry Vella	7						22 March 2024	14 June 2024
260	Liam Bowron	16	2				10	4 May 2024	2 May 2026
261	Austin Anderson	4						15 February 2025	14 March 2026
262	Feao Fotuaika	11	1				5	15 February 2025	14 June 2025
263	Tuaina Taii Tualima	14	1				5	15 February 2025	25 April 2026
264	Judah Saumaisue	3	1				5	15 February 2025	1 March 2025
265	Lington Ieli	8						15 February 2025	14 March 2026
266	Kadin Pritchard	13	1				5	15 February 2025	22 May 2026
267	David Feliuai	26	2				10	7 March 2025	5 June 2026
268	Toby Macpherson	13	2				10	14 February 2026	22 May 2026
269	Tevita Alatini	7						14 February 2026	27 March 2026
270	Tane Edmed	13	2	11			32	14 February 2026	5 June 2026
271	Kye Oates	3						7 March 2026	20 March 2026
272	Darcy Breen	7						14 March 2026	2 May 2026
273	Chris Mickelson	1	1				5	9 May 2026	9 May 2026
274	Jarrah McLeod	1						30 May 2026	30 May 2026

== Super Rugby AUS players ==
No.	Name	Caps	Tries	C	P	DG	Points	Debut	Last
1	Louis Bartley-Saena	1						14/09/2025	14/09/2025
2	Liam Bowron	6						14/09/2025	27/09/2026
3	Harvey Cordukes	3						14/09/2025	27/09/2025
4	Hudson Creighton	2	1				5	14/09/2025	20/09/2025
5	Lington Ieli	6	1				5	14/09/2025	27/09/2026
6	Toby Macpherson	6	2				10	14/09/2025	27/09/2026
7	Jarrah McLeod	6	2				10	14/09/2025	27/09/2026
8	Declan Meredith	3	1	10			25	14/09/2025	27/09/2025
9	Kadin Pritchard	5	1				5	14/09/2025	27/09/2026
10	Luke Reimer	3	1				5	14/09/2025	27/09/2025
11	Ollie Sapsford	6						14/09/2025	27/09/2026
12	Judah Saumaisue	2						14/09/2025	20/09/2025
13	Lachlan Shaw	3						14/09/2025	27/09/2025
14	Klayton Thorn	6	4				20	14/09/2025	27/09/2026
15	Rhys van Nek	6	1				5	14/09/2025	27/09/2026
16	Dan Nelson	6	1				5	14/09/2025	27/09/2026
17	Tevita Alatini	4						14/09/2025	27/09/2026
18	Tauti Chan-Tung	3						14/09/2025	27/09/2025
19	Chris Mickelson	1	1				5	14/09/2025	14/09/2025
20	Joe Dillon	3						14/09/2025	27/09/2025
21	David Feliuai	5						14/09/2025	20/09/2026
22	Rory Scott	3						14/09/2025	27/09/2025
23	Tuaina Taii Tualima	3						14/09/2025	27/09/2025
24	Shane Wilcox	2	2				10	20/09/2025	27/09/2025
25	Jack Harley	1						27/09/2025	27/09/2025
26	Kye Oates	1	1				5	27/09/2025	27/09/2025
27	Lipina Ata	1						27/09/2025	27/09/2025
28	Oscar Cleary	3						13/09/2026	27/09/2026
29	Tane Edmed	3		5			10	13/09/2026	27/09/2026
30	Eli Langi	3						13/09/2026	27/09/2026
31	Triston Reilly	3	2				10	13/09/2026	27/09/2026
32	TJ Talaileva	2						13/09/2026	27/09/2026
33	Corey Toole	3	1				5	13/09/2026	27/09/2026
34	Josh Townsend	1						13/09/2026	13/09/2026
35	Darcy Breen	3	2				10	13/09/2026	27/09/2026
36	Darcy Fogarty	3						13/09/2026	27/09/2026
37	Tavita Loughland	3						13/09/2026	27/09/2026
38	Tu'ukalilkali Vaipulu	3						13/09/2026	27/09/2026
39	Finn Baxter	2	1				5	13/09/2026	20/09/2026
40	Oscar Shaw	3		2			4	13/09/2026	27/09/2026
41	Ewald Kruger	2						13/09/2026	20/09/2026
42	Dylan Bretton	3						13/09/2026	27/09/2026
43	Chace Oates	3						13/09/2026	27/09/2026
44	Nick Frost	2						20/09/2026	27/09/2026
45	Lachlan Lonergan	1						27/09/2026	27/09/2026
