= 1996 Shute Shield season =

Rugby union competition in New South Wales

- Number of teams: 14
- Date: 20 April – 5 October 1996
- Champions: Randwick
- Runners-up: Warringah
- Matches played: 146

The 1996 Shute Shield season, also known as the AAMI Cup, was the 123rd season of the Shute Shield, the premier club rugby competition in the Australian state of New South Wales. The season began in April and was concluded in October with the Grand Final. Warringah finished minor premiers, with fourth-placed Randwick ultimately finishing premiers after winning all four of their Finals matches; defeating Warringah in the Grand Final in front of 25,136 spectators at the Sydney Football Stadium to claim the title.

The 1996 Shute Shield season featured many Wallabies and Super Rugby players, such as David Knox, David Campese, and Matt Burke. It was also the first edition of the competition to cross-over with the Super Rugby (known as the Super 12), as the inaugural Super 12 season ran from March to May of 1996.

== Stadia and personnel ==
Shute Shield team stadia

Club	Colour	Jersey	Stadium/Base
Canberra Kookaburras			Viking Park, Wanniassa
Eastern Suburbs			Woollahra Oval, Rose Bay
Eastwood			TG Millner Field, Marsfield
Gordon			Chatswood Oval, Chatswood
Newcastle Wildfires			Newcastle No.2 Sportsground, Newcastle West
Manly			Manly Oval, Manly
Northern Suburbs			North Sydney Oval, North Sydney
Parramatta			Granville Park, Merrylands
Penrith			Nepean Rugby Park, Penrith
Randwick			Coogee Oval, Coogee
Southern Districts			Forshaw Park, Sylvania Waters
Sydney University			Sydney University Football Ground (No.2 Oval), Camperdown
Warringah			Pittwater Park, Warriewood
West Harbour			Concord Oval, Concord

== Regular season ==
=== Ladder ===
Pos	Team	Pld	W	D	L	PF	PA	PD	Pts	Qualification
1	Warringah	20	16	1	3	715	319	+396	33	Advance to Semi-finals
2	Eastwood	20	16	1	3	729	388	+341	33	Advance to Elimination finals
3	Eastern Suburbs	20	16	1	3	655	368	+287	33	Advance to Elimination finals
4	Randwick (C)	20	16	0	4	798	330	+468	32	Advance to Elimination finals
5	Canberra Kookaburras	20	13	0	7	762	435	+327	26	Advance to Elimination finals
6	Gordon	20	12	0	8	625	492	+133	24	
7	Manly	20	11	2	7	498	508	−10	24	
8	Northern Suburbs	20	10	0	10	509	498	+11	20	
9	West Harbour	20	7	0	13	426	580	−154	14	
10	Newcastle Wildfires	20	6	1	13	441	694	−253	13	
11	Southern Districts	20	4	2	14	299	571	−272	10	
12	Sydney University	20	4	0	16	354	643	−289	8	
13	Parramatta	20	4	0	16	320	732	−412	8	
14	Penrith	20	1	0	19	306	880	−574	2	

Source: The Sydney Morning Herald
(C) Champions

== Finals ==
=== Bracket ===
Elimination / Preliminary Semi-finals
2	Eastwood	66
3	Eastern Suburbs	13
4	Randwick	43
5	Canberra Kookaburras	12

Minor / Major Semi-finals
1	Warringah	21
2	Eastwood	6
3	Eastern Suburbs	8
4	Randwick	26

Preliminary final
2	Eastwood	13
4	Randwick	39

Grand Final
1	Warringah	6
4	Randwick	28

=== Elimination / Preliminary Semi-finals ===
13 September 1996

Randwick	43–12	Canberra Kookaburras
Try: Smith (2); Finegan (2); Riley; Con: Knox (3/5); Pen: Knox (4)		Try: Coker; Brown; Con: Stephenson (1/2)

Sydney Football Stadium, Moore Park
Attendance: 10,756

13 September 1996

Eastwood	66–13	Eastern Suburbs
Try: Mostyn (3); Miller (2); Wisemantel (2); Leach; Hall; Hickey; Con: Burke (8/10)		Try: Clements; Con: McAusland (1/1); Pen: McAusland (2)

Sydney Football Stadium, Moore Park
Attendance: 10,756

=== Minor / Major Semi-finals ===
20 September 1996

Eastern Suburbs	8–26	Randwick
Try: Bond; Pen: Willett		Try: Holbeck; Campese; Gregan; Con: Knox (1/3); Pen: Knox (3)

Sydney Football Stadium, Moore Park
Attendance: 11,784

20 September 1996

Warringah	21–6	Eastwood
Try: Crawford; Catchpole; Con: Walton (1/2); Pen: Walton (3)		Pen: Burke (2)

Sydney Football Stadium, Moore Park
Attendance: 11,784

=== Preliminary final ===
28 September 1996

Eastwood	13–39	Randwick
Try: Pohiva; Con: Spooner (1/1); Pen: Spooner (2)		Try: Latham; Campese; Finegan; Con: Knox (3/3); Pen: Knox (6)

Concord Oval, Concord
Attendance: 4,691

=== Grand Final ===
5 October 1996

Warringah	6–28	Randwick
Pen: Walton (2)		Try: Latham; Smith; Wyllie; Con: Knox (2/3); Pen: Knox (3)

Sydney Football Stadium, Moore Park
Attendance: 25,136
