= 1990 Australia rugby union tour of New Zealand =

Summary
P	W	D	L
Total
12	7	0	5
Test match
3	1	0	2
Opponent
P	W	D	L
New Zealand
3	1	0	2

The 1990 Australia rugby union tour of New Zealand was a series of matches played by the Australia national rugby union team in New Zealand between July and August 1990.

Jason Little and David Wilson were originally selected but were injured before the tour and replaced by Dominic Maguire and Viliami Ofahengaue. Andrew Cairns also joined the team as a replacement.

Australia lost the test series against New Zealand with only the one victory from three matches. This meant the "All Blacks" held the Bledisloe Cup they had secured in 1987. However, the Australians comfortable win in the 3rd test was notable for ending New Zealand's unbeaten run since the beginning of the 1987 Rugby World Cup. The Australian team would go on to win the 1991 Rugby World Cup.

== Touring party ==
=== Players ===
- Andrew Cairns (Halfback)
- Bill Campbell (Lock)
- David Campese (Wing)
- Troy Coker (Lock)
- Paul Carozza (Wing)
- Paul Cornish (Centres)
- Tony Daly (Prop)
- Geoff Didier (Prop)
- Nick Farr-Jones (Captain) (Halfback)
- Peter FitzSimons (Lock)
- John Flett (Wing)
- Tim Gavin (No 8)
- Anthony Herbert (Centres)
- Tim Horan (Centres)
- Darren Junee (Centres)
- Phil Kearns (Hooker)
- David Knox (Five-eighths)
- Michael Lynagh (Vice-captain) (Five-eighths)
- Mark McBain (Hooker)
- Rod McCall (Lock)
- Ewen McKenzie (Prop)
- Dominic Maguire (Centres)
- Greg Martin (fullback)
- Brendan Nasser (Flanker)
- Viliami Ofahengaue (Flanker)
- John Ross (Flanker)
- Matt Ryan (Prop)
- Sam Scott-Young (Flanker)
- Peter Slattery (Halfback)
- Steve Tuynman (No 8)
- Ian Williams (wing)

=== Officials ===
- Coach: Bob Dwyer
- Assistant Coach: Bob Templeton
- Manager: Andy Conway
- Medical Officer: John Moulton
- Physiotherapist: Greg Craig

== Results ==
Scores and results list Australia's points tally first.

Opposing Team	For	Against	Date	Venue	Status
Waikato	10	21	11 July 1990	Hamilton	Tour match
Auckland	10	16	14 July 1990	Auckland	Tour match
West Coast/Buller	62	0	17 July 1990	Greymouth	Tour match
New Zealand	6	21	21 July 1990	Christchurch	Test match
Hanan Shield XV	34	0	25 July 1990	Timaru	Tour match
Otago	24	20	28 July 1990	Dunedin	Tour match
North Auckland	28	14	31 July 1990	Whangārei	Tour match
New Zealand	17	27	4 August 1990	Eden Park, Auckland	Test match
North Harbour	23	12	8 August 1990	Onewa	Tour match
Taranaki	27	3	11 August 1990	New Plymouth	Tour match
Bay of Plenty	4	12	14 August 1990	Rotorua	Tour match
New Zealand	21	9	18 August 1990	Athletic Park, Wellington	Test match
