= Boidin =

Boidin is a surname. Notable people with the surname include:

- Franck Boidin (born 1972), French foil fencer
- Susanne Boidin (born 1987), Danish sailor
- Tom Boidin (born 1990), Australian rugby union player
