= Craig Sweeny (rugby union) =

- Height: 198 cm (6 ft 6 in)
- Weight: 110 kg (243 lb)
- School: Marist College Canberra

Rugby union career
- Position: Lock
Super Rugby
Years	Team	Apps	(Points)
1996	Brumbies	7	(5)

Craig Sweeny is an Australian former professional rugby union player.

== Rugby career ==
A Marist College 1st XV player, Sweeny started out in top-grade rugby with the Tuggeranong Vikings, coached by former Wallaby Duncan Hall, and was an ACT Under-21s captain.

Sweeny, a lock, competed for the Canberra Kookaburras in the Shute Shield and spent the 1996 Super 12 season with the ACT Brumbies, making seven appearances, after which he retired from rugby.

== See also ==
- List of ACT Brumbies players
