= Dominic Maguire =

Dominic Maguire may refer to:

- Dominic Maguire (bishop) (died 1707), Irish prelate of the Roman Catholic Church
- Dominic Maguire (rugby union) (born 1964), Australian rugby union player

== See also ==
- Dominic McGuire, American professional basketball player
