= Paul Thompson =

Paul Thompson may refer to:

== Education ==
- Paul Thompson (sociologist) (born 1951), British sociologist of work and organization at the University of Stirling
- Paul B. Thompson (philosopher) (born 1951), American philosopher at Michigan State University
- Paul H. Thompson (born 20th century), American educator and administrator
- Paul Thompson (arts administrator) (born 1959), chair of the British Council
- Paul Thompson (neuroscientist) (born 1971), professor of neurology, University of Southern California

== Literature ==
- Paul Thompson (9/11 researcher), born 20th century, American writer; author of the non-fiction book The Terror Timeline
- Paul Thompson (oral historian) (born 1935), British sociologist and oral historian
- Paul B. Thompson (novelist) (born 1958), American fantasy writer
- Paul Thompson (playwright) (born 1940), Canadian playwright and theatre director

== Sports ==
- Paul Thompson (American football) (born 1983), American quarterback for the University of Oklahoma Sooners
- Paul Thompson (Australian footballer) (born 1958), Australian footballer for Melbourne
- Paul Thompson (basketball) (born 1961), American former basketball player
- Paul Thompson (footballer, born 1973) (born 1973), English former Hartlepool United player
- Paul Thompson (ice hockey, born 1906) (1906–1991), Canadian ice hockey player and coach
- Paul Thompson (ice hockey, born 1965) (born 1965), British ice hockey player and coach
- Paul Thompson (ice hockey, born 1988), American ice hockey player
- Paul Thompson (rower) (born 1964), Australian Olympic rowing coach for Australia and Great Britain
- Paul Thompson (rugby league), Australian rugby league player

== Other ==
- Paul Thompson (1907–1984), British documentary film-maker, film historian and critic better known as Paul Rotha
- Paul Thompson (broadcaster), Australian broadcaster
- Paul Thompson (musician) (born 1951), English drummer for Roxy Music
- Paul Thompson (sinologist) (1931–2007), British sinologist and pioneer in the field of Chinese computer applications
- Paul Thompson, 1st Baron Wenlock (1784–1852), English nobleman and Whig politician
- Paul W. Thompson (1906–1996), U.S. Army officer and Reader's Digest executive
- Paul Thompson (media executive), New Zealand media executive

== See also ==
- Pearl Thompson (born 1957), English musician for The Cure; born Paul Stephen Thompson
- Paul Thomson (disambiguation)
