= Andrew Cairns =

Andrew Cairns may refer to:

- Andrew Cairns (rugby union)
- Andrew Cairns (politician)
- Andy Cairns, musician
