= Gavin Johnson =

Gavin Johnson may refer to:

- Gavin Johnson (footballer) (born 1970), English former footballer
- Gavin Johnson (rugby union) (born 1966), former South African rugby union player
