= Paul Thomson (disambiguation) =

Paul Thomson is the drummer for the band Franz Ferdinand.

Paul Thomson may also refer to:

- Paul Thomson (botanist) (1916–2008), American exotic fruit enthusiast
- Paul Thomson (composer) (born 1972), English film, television, and video game composer, co-founder of Spitfire Audio
- Paul Thomson (rugby union) (born 1974), New Zealand rugby union player
- Paul Thomson (sailor) (1963–1994), Canadian sailor
- Paul van K. Thomson (1916–1999), Episcopal and Roman Catholic priest, professor and administrator at Providence College

== See also ==
- Paul Thompson (disambiguation)
- Poul Thomsen (1922–1988), Danish actor
- Poul Mathias Thomsen (born 1955), Danish economist
