= Leo Afeaki =

Australian rugby union player

- Full name: Sanualio Afeaki
- Born: 20 January 1987 (age 39)

Rugby union career
- Position: Centre
Super Rugby
Years	Team	Apps	(Points)
2008	Brumbies	6	(0)

Sanualio "Leo" Afeaki (born 20 January 1987) is an Australian former professional rugby union player.

A centre, Afeaki was an Australian under-19s trialist, signed to the Brumbies Academy from Sydney University at the end of 2007. He had only been at the academy for three months when he received a Super 14 call up early in the 2008 season, as an injury replacement for Anthony Faingaa, and made his debut against the Queensland Reds in Canberra.

Afeaki joined French club RC Narbonne in the 2009–10 Rugby Pro D2 season.

Of Tongan descent, Afeaki is related to rugby players Adam Coleman, Ben Afeaki, Stanley Afeaki and Inoke Afeaki.

== See also ==
- List of ACT Brumbies players
