= Geoff Didier =

Australian rugby union player (born 1959)

- Full name: Geoffrey Lawrence Didier
- Born: 10 August 1959 (age 67) Warrnambool, VIC, Australia
- School: Marist College Canberra; Phillip College, Canberra

Rugby union career
- Position: Front-row
Super Rugby
Years	Team	Apps	(Points)
1996	Brumbies	3	(0)
International career
Years	Team	Apps	(Points)
1990	Australia		

Geoffrey Lawrence Didier (born 10 August 1959) is an Australian former rugby union player.

Didier was born in the Victorian city of Warrnambool, moving at the age of seven to Canberra, where he undertook most of his schooling at Marist College, before finishing up at Phillip College. His parents ran a shop in the suburb of Ainslie.

A front-row forward, Didier began playing first-grade in 1978 with the Canberra Royals and would retire as their games record holder, along with winning eight premierships. Earning Wallabies selection for the 1990 tour of New Zealand, Didier had to compete with Tony Daly, Ewen McKenzie and Matt Ryan for the prop positions, and made six uncapped appearances during the tour. He made the initial extended 36-man 1991 Rugby World Cup squad

Didier was given the nickname "Duke" during his time with the Royals, which is the name he gave to his son, Commonwealth Games judoka and MMA fighter Duke Didier.

In 2000, Didier was inducted into the ACT Sport Hall of Fame.
