= James McCormack (rugby union) =

- Born: 7 April 1976 (age 50)

Rugby union career
- Position: Hooker
Super Rugby
Years	Team	Apps	(Points)
2006	Brumbies	10	(0)

James McCormack (born 7 April 1976) is an Australian former professional rugby union player.

McCormack grew up on a farm near Crookwell, New South Wales, established by his ancestors in 1863.

A hooker, McCormack played Shute Shield rugby for Manly and was involved with the New South Wales Waratahs before being drafted into the ACT Brumbies squad in 2006, as back up for Jeremy Paul. He made 10 appearances for the Brumbies during the 2006 Super 14 season.

== See also ==
- List of ACT Brumbies players
