= Scott Barton =

- Full name: Scott Andrew Barton
- Born: 24 February 1977 (age 49)

Rugby union career
- Position: Winger
Provincial / State sides
Years	Team	Apps	(Points)
2001	Bay of Plenty	10	(5)
Super Rugby
Years	Team	Apps	(Points)
2002	Brumbies	1	(0)
Medal record
Rugby sevens
Representing Australia
World Games
Silver medal – second place	2001 Akita	Team competition

Scott Andrew Barton (born 24 February 1977) is an Australian former professional rugby union player.

== Rugby career ==
A winger, Barton scored the title sealing try for the Queensland Reds in the 2000 Ricoh Championship final against the ACT Brumbies. He was forced out by the Reds at the end of the 2001 season after the club signed Wendell Sailor.

Barton continued his career at the Brumbies and featured once during the 2002 Super 12 season, against the Sharks in Canberra. He represented Australia in rugby sevens at that year's Commonwealth Games in Manchester.

== Personal life ==
In 1998, Barton escaped uninjured from a helicopter crash near the Queensland town of Alpha.

Barton is a property developer by profession.

== See also ==
- List of ACT Brumbies players
