= Sam Scott-Young =

Australian rugby union international

- Full name: Samuel Joseph Norman Scott-Young
- Born: 7 April 1967 (age 59) Townsville, QLD, Australia
- Height: 6 ft 3 in (191 cm)
- Weight: 220 lb (100 kg)
- School: Marist College Ashgrove
- Notable relative: Angus Scott-Young (son)

Rugby union career
- Position: Flanker / No. 8
International career
Years	Team	Apps	(Points)
1990–92	Australia	7	(0)

Samuel Joseph Norman Scott-Young (born 7 April 1967) is an Australian former rugby union international.

== Biography ==
Scott-Young, a native of Townsville, is the son of Queensland state politician Norman Scott-Young. He finished his schooling at Marist College Ashgrove and was a member of an Australian Schools side which finished a northern hemisphere tour undefeated. A backrow forward, he started his first-grade career with Brisbane club Souths, before making his debut for Queensland in 1987.

Between 1990 and 1992, Scott-Young was capped seven times for the Wallabies. After starting his career with home Tests against France and the United States, he gained a place on the 1990 tour of New Zealand, where his performance as flanker in a win over the All Blacks in Wellington earned him man of the match honours. He played in a Bledisloe Cup series win when the All Blacks visited in 1992, featuring in all three Tests, with his act of winking at his opposing forwards during the haka at Ballymore often remembered.

A ruptured disc below his neck forced Scott-Young into retirement in 1994.

Scott-Young is the father of Queensland Reds forward Angus Scott-Young.

== See also ==
- List of Australia national rugby union players
