= Conor Simpson =

Australian dancer

Conor Simpson (born 1994) is a competitive performer of Irish stepdance from Canberra, Australia. Having begun dancing at his mother's school at the age of nine, Simpson has been highly successful in local and international competition. He is one of the few Australians to win a title at Oireachtas Rince na Cruinne (the Irish Dancing World Championships), and has also performed professionally.

== Personal life ==
Born in Canberra in 1994 to Irish dancing teacher Monica Simpson, Simpson grew up with his father, mother and sister. He played soccer and rugby league as a child during his education at Marist College, taking up Irish dance only after being "bribed" by his mother and sister into taking classes.

He graduated in 2018 with a double degree in finance and economics at Australian National University.

== Competitive career ==
Simpson took classes at his mother's Simpson Academy of Irish Dance from the age of nine. He won seven age group titles at the ACT Championships, as well as winning his section at the Australian Irish Dancing Championships in 2006, 2008, 2009, 2010, 2011, 2012, 2014, 2016, 2017 and 2018. In 2006, he competed at Oireachtas Rince na Cruinne, the World Championships of An Coimisiún Le Rincí Gaelacha, for the first time, receiving a recall medal in his section. He returned in 2009, 2010 and 2013, placing third, third and fourth respectively.

In 2013, after finishing his secondary education, Simpson spent a gap year in Belfast, Northern Ireland, training and competing with former world champion dancer Gerard Carson at the Carson-Kennedy Academy. That year, in addition to Oireachtas Rince na Cruinne, he competed in a number of other major international championships, including the All Scotland Championships and All Ireland Championships.

After placing third at Oireachtas Rince na Cruinne in 2014 and second at the North American National Championships the same year, Simpson returned to Carson in Ireland for six weeks at the end of 2014. After a period of intense training, Simpson won the men's 20-21 years championship at Oireachtas Rince na Cruinne 2015 in Montreal, Canada, becoming only the sixth Australian to win an individual title at the World Championships.

Simpson returned to the Worlds in 2017 after spending time as a professional dancer, placing third in the open age men's competition. His preparation for competition, though restricted by his university studies, had expanded to four dance classes a week in addition to a strength and conditioning program, totalling some 20 hours a week.

== Performance career ==
In late 2015, following his competitive success, Simpson was approached by producers for the Australian tour of Irish dance show Lord of the Dance. He successfully auditioned along with another local male dancer, and was immediately flown to Adelaide to join the tour, which left Australia for Broadway shortly afterwards.
