= Christiaan Scholtz =

South African rugby union footballer

- Born: Christiaan Petrus Scholtz; 22 October 1970 (age 56) Queenstown, South Africa
- Height: 1.85 m (6 ft 1 in)
- Weight: 90 kg (198 lb)
- School: Port Rex Technical High School

Rugby union career
Provincial / State sides
Years	Team	Apps	(Points)
1993	Western Province		
1994–97	Transvaal/Gauteng Lions	54	
International career
Years	Team	Apps	(Points)
1994–95	South Africa	4	(0)

Christiaan Petrus Scholtz (born 22 October 1970 in Queenstown) is a former South African rugby union player, who played centre and won four caps between 1994 and 1995 playing for the South Africa national rugby union team.

Scholtz started an antiques business in Melville with his wife Sonia after retiring from rugby.

== Playing career ==
Scholtz represented Border Schools at the annual Craven Week tournament in 1987 and 1988. After school he enrolled at Stellenbosch University. He made his senior provincial debut for Western Province in 1993 and at end of 1993 was selected for the South African Barbarians to tour the United Kingdom. In 1994 he moved to Transvaal and during his career with Transvaal he was part of Currie Cup, Super 10, Nite Series and Lion Cup winning squads for Transvaal. In 1995 he was a member of the World Cup winning squad for South Africa. He also represented the British Barbarians.

=== Test history ===
No.	Opposition	Result (SA 1st)	Position	Tries	Date	Venue
1.	Argentina	42–22	Centre		8 Oct 1994	Boet Erasmus Stadium, Port Elizabeth
2.	Romania	21–8	Centre		30 May 1995	Newlands, Cape Town
3.	Canada	20–0	Centre		3 Jun 1995	Boet Erasmus Stadium, Port Elizabeth
4.	Samoa	42–14	Centre		10 Jun 1995	Ellis Park, Johannesburg

== Accolades ==
In 1993, Scholtz was nominated one of the five most Promising Players of the Year (under-23), along with FP Naude, Ryno Opperman, Krynauw Otto and Johan Roux.

== Later career ==
Scholtz is CEO and owner of Old Johannesburg Warehouse Auctioneers.

== See also ==
- List of South Africa national rugby union players – Springbok no. 618
