= Marist College Canberra =

Roman Catholic school in Australia

Location
- 25 Marr street, Pierce, Act; Pearce, Canberra, Australian Capital Territory; Australia; 35°21′35″S 149°05′20″E

Information
- Type: Independent primary and secondary day school
- Motto: Latin: Servo Fidem (I keep the faith)
- Religious affiliation: Association of Marist Schools of Australia
- Denomination: Catholic
- Established: 1968; 58 years ago
- Founder: Marist Brothers
- Dean: Deans provided for specific sporting Houses
- Headmaster: Liam Stakelum (appointed July 2026)
- Teaching staff: 150
- Years: 4–12
- Gender: Boys
- Enrolment: Approx. 1,900 (2025)
- Area: 15 hectares (37 acres)
- Colours: Blue and light-blue
- Song: Great Man of God
- Athletics: Yes
- Mascot: None
- Newspaper: The Maristian
- Yearbook: Blue and Blue
- Affiliation: Associated Southern Colleges
- Website: www.maristc.act.edu.au

Marist College Canberra is an independent Roman Catholic primary and secondary day school for boys, founded in 1968 by the Marist Brothers. The college is situated on 15 hectares (37 acres) and located in the Canberra suburb of Pearce, in the Australian Capital Territory, Australia. The college is a member of the Association of Marist Schools of Australia (AMSA) and the Associated Southern Colleges (ASC).

== History ==
=== Sydney, Australia ===
The origins of MCC are to be found in the first school established by the Marist Brothers in Australia - St Patrick's on Harrington St, near The Rocks, Sydney. At the request of Archbishop Holding, the first Archbishop of Sydney, four brothers arrived at the colony of New South Wales in 1872 - a Frenchman, two Irishmen and a Scot. Within six weeks, they had opened a school. There, in 1875, only three years after the foundation of this first school in Australia, the Brothers began a separate high school with Brother Augustine McDonald as its first Headmaster.

On 15 August 1887 (the Feast of the Assumption), the high school transferred to buildings located on the eastern side of St Mary's Cathedral, since this was a more central location and provided more space. The school established a reputation for high scholastic standards, evident in its examination results and the large number of students attending university.

By 1910, the school premises were run down. This, along with other difficulties, led the Marist Brothers to construct new buildings on the corner of Darley Street and Liverpool Street, Darlinghurst. The school, commonly known as “The High School”, then transferred to the new site. The college subsequently developed academic, cultural and sporting traditions, and its former students became known as “Old Boys”.

In the 1960s, demographics threatened the future of the school at Darlinghurst, while at the same time Canberra was burgeoning but had few Catholic schools. The decision was taken to sell the property. The College's badge, colours and motto were transferred to a new school in the central suburb of Pearce, Australian Capital Territory, located in the Woden Valley district of South Canberra.

=== Canberra, Australia ===
Marist College Canberra opened on January 30 1968 with 97 pupils. For the first term, classes were conducted in the old Forestry School in Yarralumla, Australian Capital Territory, while construction of the junior and secondary school buildings were being completed. The first senior classes commenced in 1971. The first graduating class was in 1975.

==== Institution child sexual abuse ====
Between 1977 and 1993 a teacher at Marist College, Brother Kosta Chute, sexually molested at least 39 students. The school investigated the first complaints concerning Chute's conduct internally, and permitted him to continue teaching. He was not removed from teaching duties until late 1993 when parents of one of his students complained to the ACT government. Chute was jailed in 2010 after being convicted on 19 counts of child sexual abuse. As of 2014 Marist College had paid almost $7 million in compensation to 38 former students who had been abused by Chute during his time at the school. In December 2015, the Royal Commission into Institutional Responses to Child Sexual Abuse found that the Marist Brothers had been aware of the allegations against Chute since the 1960s, but continued to transfer him between schools.

It also noted that another teacher at Marist College, Brother Gregory Sutton, had molested students at the school during the early 1980s leading to eight compensation payments, but found that there was no evidence that either the Marist Brothers or the school had received allegations concerning Sutton during this period.

The Canberra Marist Brothers community was disbanded at the end of 2015. This did not affect the governance of the school, as it is now staffed by lay teachers and a lay Headmaster.

== Headmasters ==
Period		Headmaster
1968–1970	2yrs	Br Crispin O'Sullivan
1971–1973	2yrs	Br Mark May
1974–1974	0yrs	Br Othmar Weldon
1975–1982	7yrs	Br Joseph McMahon
1983–1988	5yrs	Br Terrence Heinrich
1989–1990	1yr	Br Roger Burke
1991–1992	1yr	Br David Hayes
1993–2000	7yrs	Br Chris Wade
2001–2005	4yrs	Mr Ross Tarlinton
2006–2017	11yrs	Mr Richard Sidorko
2018–2026	8yrs	Mr Matthew Hutchison
2026-2027	0yrs	Mr Liam Stakelum
2027–	0yrs	Mr Ryan Greer

In November 2017, Brother Wade was sentenced to 18 months in prison, having been found guilty of previously abusing students at schools in Hamilton (1976) and Kogarah (1980).

== House System ==
=== Junior School ===
The Junior School originally consisted of four houses - O'Donoghue (blue), Chisholm (red), Hartigan (yellow), and Dempsey (green).

With the addition of two new Senior School houses for 2024, the decision was made to unify the house group system across the Junior and Senior Schools. As a result, the four Junior School houses were retired and replaced by the ten Senior School houses (listed below).

=== Senior School ===
The school's house system was implemented in 1986 from a year group system. Each house developed their own crest and motto. The original six houses were Conway, Crispin, Darlinghurst, Mark, Othmar, Patrick. In 1988, two further houses, McMahon and Haydon (the latter named after Monsignor Patrick Haydon, the first parish priest of Canberra), were added to reduce house size. In 2008, the house group system was implemented, which removed tutor groups and combined boys across Years 7 to 12 into a single house group. Each house contains seven house groups.

In 2016, Othmar House was renamed Lavalla House. This change of name was requested by the school community, following adverse findings by the Royal Commission into Institutional Responses into Child Sexual Abuse of Brother Othmar's handling of the abuse of students at another school. In July 2023, Crispin House was renamed to François House. In 2024, two new houses were added to reduce house size further: Le Rosey and Ludovic.

The Champagnat Cup ('the Cup') was introduced by the Graduating Class of 2005. The Cup is presented to the house that proves to have won overall across several house competitions. This include athletics, swimming and cross country carnivals, academic performance, community service hours, and Walkathon (funds raised).

Marist College Canberra: Houses
House	Founded	Colours
Conway	1986	White, red and black
François	1986	Red, yellow and white
Darlinghurst	1986	Dark blue, red and white
Mark	1986	Yellow, blue and white
Lavalla	1986	Black, yellow and white
Patrick	1986	Dark green, yellow and white
McMahon	1988	Light blue, white and yellow
Haydon	1988	Green, dark blue and yellow
Le Rosey	2024	Gold, green and black
Ludovic	2024	Dark red, blue and white

== Sports ==
Marist is a member school of the Associated Southern Colleges (ASC). The college competes against other schools in this competition in a number of different sports, including Australian Rules Football, hockey, athletics, cricket, rugby, swimming and cross country.

== Notable alumni ==
Former students of Marist College, Canberra are known as 'Old Boys'.

Year [X] is the last year of school attendance. Years in parentheses (X-Y) refer to years of attendance or the year of notable achievement. Chronology is determined (as far as is known) by the alumnus' last year at the College. This is a dynamic list and may never be able to satisfy particular standards for completeness.

=== Politics ===
- Brendan Smyth [1977] – former Liberal ACT MLA for Brindabella
- Jayson Hinder [1983] (1965-2017) - former Labor ACT MLA for Ginninderra
- David Smith [1987] – ALP MP for Bean
- Daniel Mulino [1987] – ALP MP for Fraser
- Andrew Wall [2002] – former Liberal ACT MLA for Brindabella

=== Military ===
- John Caligari [1978] - Lt. General AO, DSC, Military Officer
- Gerard Kearns [1999]- Colonel Gerard Kearns, Military Officer

=== Media, arts and entertainment ===
- Chris Uhlmann [1978] - journalist and presenter
- Paul McDermott [1980] – comedian, actor, writer, director, singer, artist and television personality.
- Patrick Brammall [1993] – comedian, actor, writer
- Andy Trieu [2002] - presenter and actor
- Conor Simpson [2012] - Irish dancing

=== Sport - internationals ===
- Ray Lindwall [MCD] - Cricket - Australia
- Geoff Didier [1976] – Rugby Union - Australia
- Luis Val [1977] - Judo / Olympian - Australia
- Robert Egerton [1980] - Rugby Union - Australia
- Robert Ball [1982] - Judo / Olympian
- Andrew Deane [1984] - Hockey - Australia / Olympian
- Matt O'Connor [1988] – Rugby Union - Australia
- Steven Hill [1988] - Judo / Olympian - Australia
- Dean Zammit [1989] - Rugby Union - Malta
- Tom Hill [1992] - Judo / Olympian - Australia
- Joe Roff [1993] – Rugby Union - Australia
- Simon Thompson [1995] - Triathlon / Olympian - Australia
- Lindsay Wilson [1997] - Football - Australia
- Craig Bolton [1998] – AFL - All Australian
- Kial Stewart OAM [2001] - Cycling / Paraolympian - Australia
- Stephen Howard [2004] - Rugby League USA
- Daniel Hotchkis [2003] - Hockey -Australia
- Patrick Mills [2004] – National Basketball League, Basketball - Australia / Olympian
- Daniel Howard [2004] - Rugby League USA
- Tetera Faulkner [2006] – Rugby Union - Australia
- Toby L'Estrange [2006] – Rugby Union - USA
- Josh Dugan [2006] – Rugby League Australia
- Nathan Haas [2007] - Cycling - Australia
- Joe Powell [2012] – Rugby Union - Australia
- Alex Toohey [2020] - National Basketball Association- USA

=== Administration and Coaching ===
- Nick Scrivener [1988] - ACT Brumby player and professional rugby coach
- Chris Thomson [2003] - player and Wallabies team Manager

=== AFL ===
- Adrian Barich [1980] - West Coast Eagles (later television sports presenter)
- Phil Davis [TBC] – GWS
- Tom Green [2018] – GWS
- Tom Highmore [2016] – St Kilda

=== Rugby Union ===
- Julian Salvi [2003] – ACT Brumbies
- Chris Thomson [2003] - NSW Waratahs and Melbourne Rebels
- Anthony Hegarty [2005] - ACT Brumbies
- Michael Hodge [2008] - Australia 7s and NSW Waratahs
- Phoenix Battye [2009] - Western Force
- Tom Cusack [2011] - ACT Brumbies, Australia 7s
- Rory Scott [2018] - ACT Brumbies, Australia A
- Liam Bowron [2020] - ACT Brumbies
- James Martens [2021] - Rugby Union - Queensland Reds

=== Rugby League ===
- Lincoln Withers [TBC] - NRL
- Bailey Simonsson [TBC] – NRL and NZ 7's Rugby Union

=== Hockey ===
- Henry York [2023] - Hockey - Canberra Brave, USPHL

== See also ==
- List of schools in the Australian Capital Territory
