= Ken Carrington =

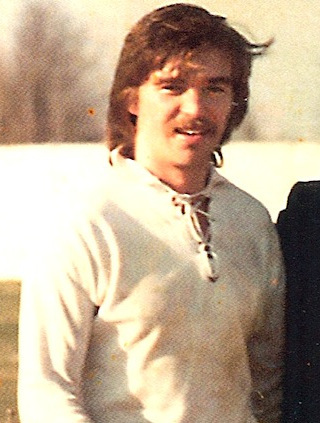
- Born: Kenneth Roy Carrington; 3 September 1950 (age 76) Whakatāne, New Zealand
- Height: 1.78 m (5 ft 10 in)
- Weight: 78 kg (172 lb)
- School: Opotiki College; Rutherford High School
- Notable relative: Matt Carrington (son)

Rugby union career
- Position: Wing, centre
Provincial / State sides
Years	Team	Apps	(Points)
1969–74	Auckland	41	
1978	Bay of Plenty	1	
International career
Years	Team	Apps	(Points)
1970–71	New Zealand Māori		
1971–72	New Zealand	3	(0)

Kenneth Roy Carrington (born 3 September 1950) is a former New Zealand rugby union player. A wing and centre three-quarter, Carrington represented Auckland and, briefly, Bay of Plenty at a provincial level, and was a member of the New Zealand national side, the All Blacks, from 1971 to 1972. He played nine matches for the All Blacks including three internationals.
