= Peter Owens =

- Born: 2 February 1983 (age 43)
- Height: 180 cm (5 ft 11 in)
- Weight: 89 kg (196 lb)

Rugby union career
- Position: Five-eighth / Wing
Super Rugby
Years	Team	Apps	(Points)
2005	Brumbies	1	(0)
National sevens team
Years	Team		Comps
- Australia

Peter Owens (born 2 February 1983) is an Australian former professional rugby union player.

Originally a five-eighth, Owens had his breakthrough season in 2004 after moving to the wing and was named "best newcomer" of the year with the national rugby sevens team, to help earn him a two-year contract with reigning Super 12 champions the ACT Brumbies, prior to their 2005 campaign.

Owens made his only Brumbies appearance off the bench in win over the Stormers during the 2005 Super 12 season. His 2005 season also included a Shute Shield title with Warringah, with his late try securing a 29-23 grand final victory over Sydney University. He left for Ireland in 2006 to play with Cork-based club Dolphin.

== See also ==
- List of ACT Brumbies players
