= Simon Ross (rugby union) =

- Born: 4 March 1977 (age 49)

Rugby union career
- Position: Prop
Super Rugby
Years	Team	Apps	(Points)
2000	Brumbies	2	(0)

Simon Ross (born 4 March 1977) is an Australian former professional rugby union player.

A prop, Ross was an Australian under-19s and 21s representative player.

Ross played for the Brothers club in Brisbane and was signed by the ACT Brumbies in 1999. He made two appearances for the Brumbies during the 2000 Super 12 season, before a back injury suffered while practising a scrum forced him into retirement at the age of 23, having been advised he faced possible paralysis if he continued playing.

== See also ==
- List of ACT Brumbies players
