= Robert Egerton =

Robert Egerton (22 May 1915 – 25 September 2000) was a legal and social reform campaigner known for his work in advocating legal aid.

== Early life ==
Son of a Mancunian cloth manufacturer, he was educated at Oundle and Cambridge. In his early career, Egerton worked as an articled clerk on Wallis Simpson’s (of Edward and Mrs Simpson) divorce.

== Career ==
His major work was in social legal reform. As a solicitor and conscientious objector he attended a course at Toynbee Hall and subsequently worked as a "poor man’s lawyer" firstly in a basement in Fitzroy Square, London and afterwards at Cambridge house settlement in Camberwell. After two years of this work he saw the need for a greatly extended legal aid system. He researched in the Law Society Library and the Reading Room of the British Museum, devising questionnaires to send out to assess the existing provisions. He published his findings to form the basis of a comprehensive Legal Aid system in a book "Legal Aid" published by Kegan Paul, He championed the case for a more accessible legal system through this and other writing including an article in the Spectator.

Egerton attended the House of Lords to give oral evidence. A report came out in 1946 in which the principle of comprehensive system was endorsed. The Legal Aid and Advice Act was passed in 1949. He was then asked by Sir George Hayes – Director of the National Council for Social Service to be honorary legal advisor to the National Citizen’s Advice Bureau. Egerton later became the Vice Chair of the National Council of the Citizen’s Advice Bureau. During his time in this post he dealt with concern over legal advice offered by CAB workers and dealt with legal profession issues. He was a member of the Lord Chancellor’s Departmental Committee (the Payne Committee) to abolish imprisonment for the non-payment of debt. He also served on the National Council for Social Service on Charitable fundraising.

Egerton also was president of the Westminster Law Society and set up the London branch of the Small Claims Court – an initiative introduced in Manchester.
