= Fili Finau =

- Born: Salesi Fili Finau; January 4, 1972 (age 54) Neiafu, Vava'u Tonga
- Height: 6 ft 0 in (183 cm)
- Weight: 237 lb (108 kg)
- School: Homebush Boys High School

Rugby union career
- Position: Flanker
Amateur team(s)
Years	Team	Apps	(Points)
1990-1993	West Harbour RFC		
Provincial / State sides
Years	Team	Apps	(Points)
1993-1997	New South Wales		
Super Rugby
Years	Team	Apps	(Points)
1997-2001	NSW Waratahs	15	(10)
International career
Years	Team	Apps	(Points)
1990	Australia Schools		
1997	Australia	1	(0)

Salesi Fili Finau (born Neiafu, 4 January 1972) is a former Tongan-born Australian rugby union player who played as flanker.

== Career ==
Born on the island of Vava'u and educated at the Homebush Boys High School, Finau first played for West Harbour RFC in 1990, before his debut for the New South Wales representative team, which was during a match against the ACT Kookaburras played in Canberra, in 1993. He also played two seasons for the Waratahs in the Super 12.

=== International career ===
At the international level, Finau debuted for the Australia Schoolboys XV, which was touring in Britain and Europe in 1990. His debut for the Wallabies was during the 1993 end of the year Australia tours in North America and Europe, although he played five uncapped matches for an Australian XV. His only test cap for Australia was during the third Bledisloe Cup test against the All Blacks in Dunedin, on 16 August 1997, replacing the injured flankers Matt Cockbain and Daniel Manu as blindside flankers.
