= Andrew Willett =

Australian rugby footballer

Personal information
- Full name: Andrew Brian Willett
- Born: 23 August 1970 (age 55) Sydney, New South Wales, Australia
- Height: 178 cm (5 ft 10 in)
- Weight: 85 kg (13 st 5 lb)

Playing information

Rugby union
- Position: Fly Half (rugby union)
Club
| Years | Team | Pld | T | G | FG | P |
|---|---|---|---|---|---|---|
| 1989–94 | Northern Suburbs |
Representative
| Years | Team | Pld | T | G | FG | P |
| 2000 | Australia 7s |

Rugby league
- Position: Wing
Club
| Years | Team | Pld | T | G | FG | P |
|---|---|---|---|---|---|---|
| 1995 | South Sydney Rabbitohs | 14 | 0 | 35 | 0 | 70 |

Andrew Willett (born 23 August 1970) is an Australian former rugby union and rugby league footballer who played in the 1990s and 2000s. He played his rugby union career at the Northern Suburbs Rugby Club. He played his rugby league career at the South Sydney Rabbitohs.

== Playing career ==
Willett was graded by the Northern Suburbs Rugby Club in 1990 and holds the distinction of scoring the most points in a match for Northern Suburbs (37 points against Drummoyne DRFC in 1993). Willett's stint with Northern Suburbs ended at the conclusion of the 2001 season.

Willett switched to rugby league in 1995, signing with ARL side the South Sydney Rabbitohs. He made his first grade debut on the wing in his side's 42−18 loss to the Manly Warringah Sea Eagles at the Sydney Football Stadium in round 1 of the 1995 season. His stint with the Rabbitohs and in rugby league ended at the conclusion of the 1995 season. He kicked 35 goals.

Willett returned to rugby union in 1996, and played for the Australia national rugby sevens team in 2000/2001. Additionally he played for NSW and the Australian Barbarians.

Whilst playing professionally, Willett also had a career in business where he was a Treasury Manager performing roles as a currency trader, relationship manager, and media representative - which involved live daily television crosses reporting on financial market movements.

Once retired from professional rugby, Willett pursued a full academic scholarship to the University of Oxford where he completed a Master's in Business Degree focusing on business development and entrepreneurship.

The business plan he wrote whilst studying for the MBA raised funding and became a reality in the form of 'Pure Sports Medicine' where he was Founder, CEO and MD. He now acts as a consultant to start-ups.
