= Daryl Lilley =

New Zealand rugby union player (1974–2026)

- Full name: Daryl Paul Lilley
- Born: 17 September 1974 New Plymouth, New Zealand
- Died: 9 November 2026 (aged 52) New Zealand
- Height: 5 ft 11 in (180 cm)
- Weight: 180 lb (82 kg)

Rugby union career
- Positions: Fullback; wing
Provincial / State sides
Years	Team	Apps	(Points)
1993–1996	Taranaki	41	(362)
1997–1999	Canterbury	20	(51)
2000–2003	Taranaki	43	(415)
Super Rugby
Years	Team	Apps	(Points)
1997–1999	Crusaders	29	(81)
2000–2002	Hurricanes	26	(104)

Daryl Paul Lilley (17 September 1974 – 9 November 2026) was a New Zealand professional rugby union player.

Lilley was born in New Plymouth and educated at New Plymouth Boys' High School.

A goal-kicking utility back, Lilley began in provincial rugby with Taranaki in 1993 and moved to Canterbury four years later, spending the rest of the decade playing fullback with the Crusaders. He contributed to the Crusaders' first Super 12 title win in 1998, scoring the winning try in the semi-final against the Sharks. After returning to Taranaki in 2000, Lilley began playing for the Hurricanes, which used him mainly as a winger. He finished his career with a season at the Newcastle Falcons, as injury cover for Jonny Wilkinson, then two seasons with Rugby Viadana in Italy.

Lilley died on 9 November 2026, at the age of 52.
