= Paul Thompson (Australian footballer) =

Australian rules footballer

Personal information
- Full name: Paul Thompson
- Born: 19 April 1958 (age 68)
- Original team: Melbourne Grammar School
- Height: 188 cm (6 ft 2 in)

Playing career^{1}
Years	Club	Games (Goals)
1978	Melbourne	6 (0)
- ^{1} Playing statistics correct to the end of 1978.

Paul Thompson (born 19 April 1958) is a former Australian rules footballer who played with Melbourne in the Victorian Football League (VFL).
