= Joe Gillingham =

South African rugby union player

- Born: Joseph William Gillingham; 27 February 1974 (age 52) Johannesburg, Gauteng
- Height: 6 ft 4 in (193 cm)
- Weight: 204 lb (93 kg)
- School: Hoërskool Alberton

Rugby union career
Senior career
Years	Team	Apps	(Points)
2001–2002	USA Perpignan		
2002–2003	RC Narbonne		
Provincial / State sides
Years	Team	Apps	(Points)
1991–1995	Golden Lions	62	
1998–2000	Natal	32	
Super Rugby
Years	Team	Apps	(Points)
1998–2000	Coastal Sharks	20	(15)
International career
Years	Team	Apps	(Points)
1996	South Africa		

Joseph William Gillingham (born 27 February 1974) is a South African former rugby union player who played as a centre, wing or full-back.

== Playing career ==
Gillingham represented Transvaal at the 1992 Craven Week tournament for schoolboys and was selected for the South African Schools team in 1992. He made his provincial debut for Transvaal in 1994 and played for the South African under–21 and the under–23 teams. In 1998 he joined Natal, playing provincial rugby for the union and super rugby for the Coastal Sharks. At the end of the 1996 season, he toured with the Springboks to Argentina and Europe. Gillingham did not play in any test matches but played in seven tour matches, scoring one try for the Springboks.

== See also ==
- List of South Africa national rugby union players – Springbok no. 640
- List of South Africa national under-18 rugby union team players
