= Chris Badenhorst =

South Africa international rugby union player

- Born: Christopher Badenhorst; 12 December 1965 (age 60) Windhoek, South Africa (now Namibia)
- Height: 1.71 m (5 ft 7 in)
- Weight: 77 kg (170 lb)
- School: Windhoek High School, Windhoek
- University: University of the Free State

Rugby union career
- Position: Wing
Provincial / State sides
Years	Team	Apps	(Points)
1986–1999	Free State	221	
International career
Years	Team	Apps	(Points)
1994–1995	South Africa	2	(10)
National sevens team
Years	Team		Comps
1993, 1996	South Africa 7s		3

Christopher Badenhorst (born 12 December 1965) is a South African former rugby union player.

== Playing career ==
Born and schooled in Windhoek, Namibia, Badenhorst made his provincial debut for the Free State in 1986 and continued to represent the union 221 times, scoring 136 tries.

Badenhorts made his test debut for the Springboks in 1994 against the Argentina at Ellis Park in Johannesburg, scoring two tries on debut. In 1994 he toured with the Springboks to New Zealand and Britain and Ireland. In addition to the 2 Test matches, he also played ten tour matches and scored 7 tries for the Springboks.

=== Test history ===
No.	Opposition	Result (SA 1st)	Position	Tries	Date	Venue
1.	Argentina	46–26	Wing	2	15 Oct 1994	Ellis Park, Johannesburg
2.	Samoa	60–8	Replacement		13 Apr 1995	Ellis Park, Johannesburg

== See also ==
- List of South Africa national rugby union players – Springbok no. 610
- List of South Africa national rugby sevens players
