= Matt Carrington (rugby union) =

NZ rugby union player

- Full name: Matthew John Carrington
- Born: 26 August 1976 (age 50) Henderson, Auckland, New Zealand
- Height: 5 ft 11 in (180 cm)
- Weight: 198 lb (90 kg)
- Notable relative: Ken Carrington (father)

Rugby union career
- Position: Fullback / Wing
Provincial / State sides
Years	Team	Apps	(Points)
1995–96	Auckland	8	(68)
1997–99	Otago	33	(75)
Super Rugby
Years	Team	Apps	(Points)
1997–99	Highlanders	19	(20)

Matthew John Carrington (born 26 August 1976) is a New Zealand former professional rugby union player.

== Biography ==
Born in Auckland, Carrington is the son of All Black Ken Carrington.

Carrington played his rugby as a fullback or winger and was an accomplished goal-kicker, notably winning a 1996 Ranfurly Shield defence against the Bay of Plenty with a sideline conversion.

A NZ under-21s representative, Carrington played three seasons with the Highlanders in the Super 12, debuting as a 21-year-old. He continued his career in England, playing for the Bristol Bears. By virtue of his grandparents, Carrington was England qualified and represented his adopted country in rugby sevens.
