= Matt Ryan (rugby union) =

Australian rugby union player (born 1967)

- Full name: Matthew John Ryan
- Born: 13 January 1967 (age 59) Sydney, NSW, Australia
- Height: 178 cm (5 ft 10 in)
- Weight: 112 kg (247 lb)
- School: Waverley College; St Joseph's College

Rugby union career
- Position: Prop
Super Rugby
Years	Team	Apps	(Points)
1996–97	Reds	10	(0)
International career
Years	Team	Apps	(Points)
1990–92	Australia		

Matthew John Ryan (born 13 January 1967) is an Australian former professional rugby union player.

Born in Sydney, Ryan attended Waverley College up until the ninth grade, when he moved to St Joseph's College, Hunters Hill, from where he won Australian Schools representative honours in 1985.

Ryan was a front rower and began in first-grade with West Harbour, before switching states in 1989 to play at Brisbane club Brothers. He earned Queensland selection in 1990 for a tour of Fiji.

Between 1990 and 1992, Ryan made three overseas Wallabies tours without winning a cap. He was unused off the bench in the 1st Test against France at the Sydney Football Stadium in 1990, then missed the remainder of the series with a facial viral infection, after which he won selection for that year's tour of New Zealand. His first Wallabies appearance came in a tour match against Waikato and he sat on the bench as a reserve for all three Tests. He didn't feature in any Wallabies sides during the World Cup year due to an inflamed disc, then returned in 1992 to make the tour of South Africa, followed by a tour Wales and Ireland. During the Ireland tour, Ryan scored Australia's only try in a narrow win over Connacht.

Ryan was a member of the Queensland Reds side that won the 1995 Super 10 title. He remained with the Reds for the first two seasons of the Super 12 competition and later coached Penrith in the Shute Shield.
