= Paul Thomson (rugby union) =

New Zealand rugby union player (born 1974)

- Full name: Paul Hugh Thomson
- Born: 4 September 1974 (age 52) Auckland, New Zealand
- Height: 6 ft 3 in (191 cm)
- Weight: 264 lb (120 kg)

Rugby union career
- Position: Prop
Provincial / State sides
Years	Team	Apps	(Points)
1995–01	Auckland	51	(15)
Super Rugby
Years	Team	Apps	(Points)
1997–01	Blues	40	(10)

Paul Hugh Thomson (born 4 September 1974) is a New Zealand former professional rugby union player.

A prop, Thomson was a NZ Māori representative player and competed in the Super 12 with the Blues. He featured regularly during the Blues' competition-winning 1997 Super 12 campaign and was on the bench for the grand final against the Brumbies. In 1999, Thomson captained Auckland to the NPC title.

Thomson left New Zealand rugby in 2002 after failing to make the Blues squad and signed a three-year deal with Scottish club Borders. He applied to represented Scotland on account of having a grandfather from Ayrshire, but was ruled ineligible by the IRB due to having previously made a New Zealand "A" squad.
