= Johan Roux =

South African rugby union player (born 1969)

- Born: Johannes Petrus Roux; 25 February 1969 (age 57) Pretoria, South Africa
- Height: 1.80 m (5 ft 11 in)
- Weight: 80 kg (176 lb)

Rugby union career
Provincial / State sides
Years	Team	Apps	(Points)
1991–92	Northern Transvaal	16	
1993–98	Transvaal	111	(417)
International career
Years	Team	Apps	(Points)
1994–96	South Africa	12	(10)

Johannes Petrus Roux (born 25 February 1969) is a South African rugby union player, who played for the South Africa national rugby union team.

== Career ==
=== Provincial ===
Roux first played provincial rugby in 1991 for Northern Transvaal and in 1993 moved to Transvaal (later to be named the Golden Lions). He played 111 matches for Transvaal or the Golden Lions and was a member of the teams that won the Currie Cup in 1993 and 1994. In 1993, he was selected for the South African Barbarians, to tour the United Kingdom.

=== International ===
Roux made his test debut for the Springboks against England on 11 June 1994 at Newlands in Cape Town. He was member of the 1995 World Cup squad, playing in three matches during the tournament. Roux also played in five tour matches, scoring two tries for the Springboks.

=== Test history ===
No.	Opposition	Result (SA 1st)	Position	Tries	Date	Venue
1.	England	27–9	Scrum-half		11 Jun 1994	Newlands, Cape Town
2.	New Zealand	14–22	Scrum-half		9 Jul 1994	Carisbrook, Dunedin
3.	New Zealand	9–13	Scrum-half		23 Jul 1994	Athletic Park, Wellington
4.	New Zealand	18–18	Scrum-half		6 Aug 1994	Eden Park, Auckland
5.	Argentina	42–22	Scrum-half	2	8 Oct 1994	Boet Erasmus Stadium, Port Elizabeth
6.	Romania	21–8	Scrum-half		30 May 1995	Newlands, Cape Town
7.	Canada	20–0	Scrum-half		3 Jun 1995	Boet Erasmus Stadium, Port Elizabeth
8.	France	19–15	Replacement		17 Jun 1995	Kings Park, Durban
9.	Australia	16–21	Replacement		13 Jul 1996	Sydney Football Stadium, Sydney
10.	New Zealand	11–15	Scrum-half		20 Jul 1996	AMI Stadium, Christchurch
11.	Australia	25–19	Scrum-half		3 Aug 1996	Free State Stadium, Bloemfontein
12.	New Zealand	19–23	Scrum-half		17 Aug 1996	Kings Park, Durban

== Accolades ==
In 1993, Roux was nominated one of the five most Promising Players of the Year (under-23), along with FP Naude, Ryno Opperman, Krynauw Otto and Christiaan Scholtz.

== See also ==
- List of South Africa national rugby union players – Springbok no. 607
