= Gavin Johnson (rugby union) =

South African rugby union footballer

- Born: Gavin Keith Johnson; 17 October 1966 (age 60) Louis Trichardt, Limpopo, South Africa
- Height: 6 ft 2 in (1.88 m)
- Weight: 172 lb (78 kg; 12 st 4 lb)
- School: Capricorn High School

Rugby union career
- Position(s): Wing, Fullback
Senior career
| Years | Team | Apps | (Points) |
| 1997–1999 | Saracens | 37 | (363) |
Provincial / State sides
| Years | Team | Apps | (Points) |
| 1993–1997 | Transvaal | 69 | (821) |
Super Rugby
| Years | Team | Apps | (Points) |
| 1997 | Gauteng Lions | 8 | (114) |
International career
| Years | Team | Apps | (Points) |
| 1993–1995 | South Africa | 7 | (86) |

Gavin Keith Johnson (born 17 October 1966) is a South African former rugby union player who played for South Africa between 1993 and 1995. He played as a wing or a fullback and was a member of the squad that won the 1995 Rugby World Cup.

== Career ==
=== Provincial ===
Johnson made his provincial debut for Transvaal in 1993 and in the same year gained selection for the South African Barbarians, to tour the United Kingdom. Johnson played 69 games for the Transvaal and scored 821 points, which at the time was the second most by a Transvaal player, after that of Gerald Bosch.

=== International ===
He played his first test match for the Springboks on 13 November 1993 against Argentina in Buenos Aires. In all, he played in seven Test matches for the Springboks, 3 of whom were at the 1995 World Cup. He also played in 5 tour matches in which he scored 87 points.

=== Test history ===
| No. | Opposition | Result (SA 1st) | Position | Points | Date | Venue |
|---|---|---|---|---|---|---|
| 1. | Argentina | 52–23 | Fullback | 22 (1 try, 4 conv, 3 pen) | 13 Nov 1993 | Ferro Carril Oeste Stadium, Buenos Aires |
| 2. | New Zealand | 18–18 | Wing | 13 (1 try, 1 conv, 2 pen) | 6 Aug 1994 | Eden Park, Auckland |
| 3. | Argentina | 42–22 | Fullback | | 8 Oct 1994 | Boet Erasmus, Port Elizabeth |
| 4. | Samoa | 60–8 | Fullback | 28 (3 try, 5 conv, 1 pen) | 13 Apr 1995 | Ellis Park, Johannesburg |
| 5. | Romania | 21–8 | Fullback | 11 (1 conv, 3 pen) | 30 May 1995 | Newlands, Cape Town |
| 6. | Canada | 20–0 | Wing | | 3 Jun 1995 | Boet Erasmus, Port Elizabeth |
| 7. | Samoa | 42–14 | Wing | 12 (3 conv, 2 pen) | 10 Jun 1995 | Ellis Park, Johannesburg |

Legend: pen = penalty (3 pts.); conv = conversion (2 pts.), drop = drop kick (3 pts.).

== See also ==
- List of South Africa national rugby union players – Springbok no. 604
