= Mitch Hardy =

Australian rugby union international

- Full name: Mitchell Duncan Hardy
- Born: 15 June 1971 (age 55) Sydney, Australia
- Height: 6 ft 1 in (185 cm)
- Weight: 202 lb (92 kg)
- School: Ku-ring-gai High School

Rugby union career
- Position: Wing
Super Rugby
Years	Team	Apps	(Points)
1996–00	ACT Brumbies		
International career
Years	Team	Apps	(Points)
1997–98	Australia	8	(10)

Mitchell Duncan Hardy (born 15 June 1971) is an Australian former rugby union international.

Hardy, born in Sydney, attended Ku-ring-gai High School and played in the local Shute Shield competition for Gordon. He competed in the Super 14 for the ACT Brumbies from 1996 to 2000, then left to play in France for CA Brive.

A winger, Hardy represented Australia in eight Test matches across 1997 and 1998. On his debut match, against France in Sydney, he came on as a temporary substitute while Stephen Larkham was being treated and scored two tries, before returning to the bench. This made him the first Wallaby since Tim Lane in 1985 to score twice on debut.

Hardy is a former general manager of RugbyWA.

== See also ==
- List of Australia national rugby union players
