= Tom Boidin =

- Full name: Thomas Boidin
- Born: 19 June 1990 (age 36)
- Height: 193 cm (6 ft 4 in)
- Weight: 104 kg (229 lb)
- School: St Patrick's College
- University: University of Sydney
- Occupation: Engineer

Rugby union career
- Position: Flanker
Super Rugby
Years	Team	Apps	(Points)
2011	Brumbies	2	(0)

Thomas Boidin (born 19 June 1990) is an Australian former professional rugby union player.

Boidin was educated at St Patrick's College, Strathfield, and the University of Sydney.

A loose forward, Boidin played mainly as a flanker and captained Sydney University to a Colts premiership in 2010. He had skippered their first-grade side by the age of 23 and became full-time captain in the 2014 season. Signed to the Brumbies academy, Boidin made two Super Rugby appearances in 2011, sharing his debut with varsity teammate Sam Carter against the Rebels. He played with French club RC Narbonne in the 2014–15 and 2015–16 seasons.
