= Timote Tavalea =

- Full name: Timote Fomonga Tavalea
- Born: 20 March 1972 (age 54)
- Height: 5 ft 11 in (180 cm)
- Weight: 220 lb (100 kg)

Rugby union career
- Position: Hooker / Flanker
Super Rugby
Years	Team	Apps	(Points)
1996–97	Brumbies	2	(0)
1998–99	Waratahs	10	(0)
2000	Reds	2	(0)
International career
Years	Team	Apps	(Points)
1995	Tonga		

Timote Fomonga Tavalea (born 20 March 1972) is an Australian former professional rugby union player.

A mobile hooker and flanker of Tongan origin, Tavalea played his rugby in Australia, making appearances in the Super 12 for the ACT Brumbies, NSW Waratahs and Queensland Reds. He was with the Tongan national team in 1995 and featured at the Super 10 competition, but missed selection for that year's World Cup in South Africa.

Tavalea works at John Paul College in Brisbane, where he is a former first XV coach. His son, also named Timote, is a past pupil and plays professional rugby in Japan after moving there for his studies.
