= John Langford (rugby union) =

Australia international rugby union player

- Born: John Langford; 26 June 1968 (age 58) Wagga Wagga, Australia
- Height: 6 ft 7 in (2.01 m)
- Weight: 242 lb (110 kg; 17 st 4 lb)

Rugby union career
- Position: Lock
Senior career
Years	Team	Apps	(Points)
1996–99	Brumbies		
1999–2001	Munster	30	(10)
2014	Sydney Irish	1	(0)
- Correct as of 12 October 2011
International career
Years	Team	Apps	(Points)
1997–97	Australia	4	(0)
- Correct as of 8 June 2011

John Langford is an Australian rugby union player. He played as a Lock. He played for Sydney University, Gordon, Brumbies, Munster, and Australia.
