= Dean Zammit =

Malta international rugby union player (born 1971)

- Born: 11 November 1971 (age 55)
- School: Marist College Canberra

Rugby union career
- Position: Prop
Super Rugby
Years	Team	Apps	(Points)
1997–98	Brumbies	13	(0)
International career
Years	Team	Apps	(Points)
- Malta

Dean Zammit (born 11 November 1971) is an Australian former professional rugby union player.

Zammit was educated at Marist College Canberra and played on the school's 1988 Waratah Shield-winning team.

A prop, Zammit was an Australian Under 21s representative and played with the Canberra Vikings. He competed for the ACT Brumbies in two Super 12 seasons, making 13 appearances.

Zammit played international rugby for Malta.
