= Dominic Maguire (rugby union) =

Australian rugby union international

- Full name: Dominic John Maguire
- Born: 2 July 1964 (age 62) Brisbane, Australia

Rugby union career
- Position: Centre
International career
Years	Team	Apps	(Points)
1989	Australia	3	(4)

Dominic John Maguire (born 2 July 1964) is an Australian former rugby union international.

Maguire was born in Brisbane and educated at Padua College.

A centre, Maguire played for Brisbane club Brothers and was capped three times for the Wallabies during the 1989 British Lions tour to Australia. He debuted as the outside centre in Australia's 1st Test win over the Lions in Sydney, scoring a second-half try, then leaving the after-match celebrations early to attend his brother's wedding.

== See also ==
- List of Australia national rugby union players
