= Andrew Cairns (rugby union) =

Australia international rugby union player

- Full name: Andrew John Cairns
- Born: 25 August 1967 (age 59) Sydney, NSW, Australia
- School: Canberra Grammar School; St Joseph's College

Rugby union career
- Position: Halfback
Provincial / State sides
Years	Team	Apps	(Points)
- New South Wales
International career
Years	Team	Apps	(Points)
1990	Australia		

Andrew John Cairns (born 25 August 1967) is an Australian former international rugby union player.

Born in Sydney, Cairns received his early education at Canberra Grammar, but finished his schooling at St Joseph's College, Hunters Hill, where he featured in a GPS premiership-winning 1st XV. While at St Joseph's College he was selected for the Australian Schools 1986 tour of New Zealand. He represented the Australia national under-21 rugby union team in 1988, with the Phil Kearns-captained side defeating New Zealand under-21s at Ballymore Stadium.

Cairns, a halfback, began his senior career with Eastwood and made his New South Wales representative debut in 1989, the same year he scored four tries for a President's XV against the AIS.

In 1990, Cairns was flown over to New Zealand to link up with the Wallabies, after Nick Farr-Jones injured his hamstring. The squad's reserve halfback, Peter Slattery, was to be rested for their tour match against North Auckland and the Wallabies required the services of Cairns, who impressed coach Bob Dwyer in a 28–14 win. He ended the year with selection to the Emerging Wallabies side for their tour to Europe.

Cairns finished his career playing in Canberra with the Tuggeranong Vikings.

== See also ==
- List of Australia national rugby union players
