= David Knox (rugby union) =

Australia international rugby union player

- Born: David John Knox; 3 August 1963 (age 63) Coogee, NSW
- Height: 6 ft 1 in (1.85 m)
- Weight: 191 lb (87 kg; 13.6 st)

Rugby union career
- Position: Fly-half
Senior career
Years	Team	Apps	(Points)
1986–1989	Petrarca Padova		
1990–1992	Rugby Livorno		
1998	Bristol Rugby		
–	Racing Métro 92		
–	Narbonne		
International career
Years	Team	Apps	(Points)
1985-1997	Australia	13	(130)
Coaching career
- Years: Team
- 2000: Padova
- 2002–2003: Waverley College
- 2005-2008: Leinster Rugby

David Knox is an Australian former rugby union footballer and coach.

== Life and career ==
Knox was capped 13 times for Australia and was a member of the 1991 Australian World Cup champion squad. Prior to winning eight First Grade Premiership with Randwick, he lost a Second Grade Premiership to the very strong Eastwood Rugby Club team in 1983.

Knox was regularly the appointed goal kicker in teams he joined, known as "the man for the job."

He also played with Petrarca Padova Rugby (1986–1989) where he won the 1987 National Championship, Rugby Livorno (1990–1992), Bristol Rugby (1998) and Racing Métro 92, Narbonne (1999).

From 1996 he played for the ACT Brumbies, where he subsequently held the position of assistant backs coach, in the Super 12 (now Super Rugby) from 1996 to 1998 including the 1997 Super 12 season against the Auckland Blues. He also played in the Currie Cup with the Sharks in 1997–1998.

He scored 130 points for the Wallabies, approximately 600 points at provincial level (New South Wales, ACT Brumbies and Sharks) and a club record 2,900 points with Randwick.

=== Coaching ===
Knox has held coaching positions with Padova (2000), Waverley College (2002–2003), South Sydney Rugby League (2003) and Randwick (with Michael Cheika). In 2005, he joined Michael Chelka to Leinster as backs coach. Whilst there, Leinster made the semi-finals and quarter-finals of the Heineken Cup, and won the Celtic League title.

Knox left Leinster in 2008 to return to Australia, but in a post-departure interview was controversially critical of Irish provincial team Munster and the appointment of incoming Irish coach Declan Kidney.

From 2013 to 2015 whilst as a teacher at Sydney Boys High School, he coached the 1st XV and helped with the junior grades' development. Knox has since been teaching at Sydney Boys High School and is a Design and Technology teacher. Knox had been studying Design and Technology to become a permanent teacher and to ensure his students are well taught.

Knox has also done annual consultant rugby coaching in the United States from 2011 to 2016, with stints at Columbia University in New York City, SFGG in San Francisco and most recently at Morris Rugby & Drew University in New Jersey.
