= James Holbeck =

Australian rugby union international

- Full name: James Charles Holbeck
- Born: 10 July 1973 (age 53) Ipswich, QLD, Australia
- Height: 6 ft 0 in (183 cm)
- Weight: 206 lb (93 kg)

Rugby union career
- Position: Inside centre
International career
| Years | Team | Apps | (Points) |
| 1997–2001 | Australia | 7 | (0) |

James Charles Holbeck (born 10 July 1973) is an Australian former rugby union international.

Holbeck, the son of an Anglican minister, was born in Ipswich, Queensland and raised in New South Wales. He was educated at both The Armidale School and Sydney Boys High School.

An inside centre, Holbeck was an Australian underage representative and played first-grade for Randwick, before breaking into the ACT Brumbies side for the first time in 1996. He gained six Wallabies caps in 1997, which included three Tests against the All Blacks, while he also made history as the first player in Test rugby to be sent to the sin bin during a Tri Nations match in Pretoria. Shoulder surgery kept him on the sidelines the following year and his only further Wallabies cap came in Sydney in 2001, for the deciding Test of the historic series win over the British & Irish Lions.

== See also ==
- List of Australia national rugby union players
