= Troy Coker =

Australian rugby union player

Troy Coker (born 30 May 1965 in Brisbane) is a former Australian international rugby union player. He played as a number 8 and was capped 27 times for Australia between 1987 and 1997. He was a member of the winning Australian squad at the 1991 Rugby World Cup and was also in the squad at the 1987 and 1995 Rugby World Cup. He is married and has two daughters, Ella and Ava. "Profile". ESPN Scrum.
