= Dan Vickerman Cup =

Rugby Union match between ACT Brumbies and NSW Waratahs

- Awarded for: Winning the biannual ACT Brumbies versus NSW Waratahs match.
- Country: Australia
- Presented by: Rugby Australia

History
- First award: 2017
- Most recent: ACT Brumbies

The Dan Vickerman Cup is a rugby union match, initially contested as a one-off match in 2017, and afterwards biannually, in Super Rugby between the ACT Brumbies and the NSW Waratahs. The Dan Vickerman Cup was introduced in 2017 to commemorate Dan Vickerman.

== Dan Vickerman ==
Dan Vickerman was an Australian Rugby Union International Lock. He played over 60 games for Australia, winning the 2011 Tri Nations and a bronze medal at the 2011 Rugby World Cup. He won the 2001 Super 12 title and made the 2002 Super 12 final with the Brumbies, and also made the 2005 Super 12 final and 2008 Super 14 final with the Waratahs.

Vickerman died by suicide in his home on 18 February 2017, at the age of 37 years.

== History ==
=== Era of Home Field Advantage (1996 – 2010) ===
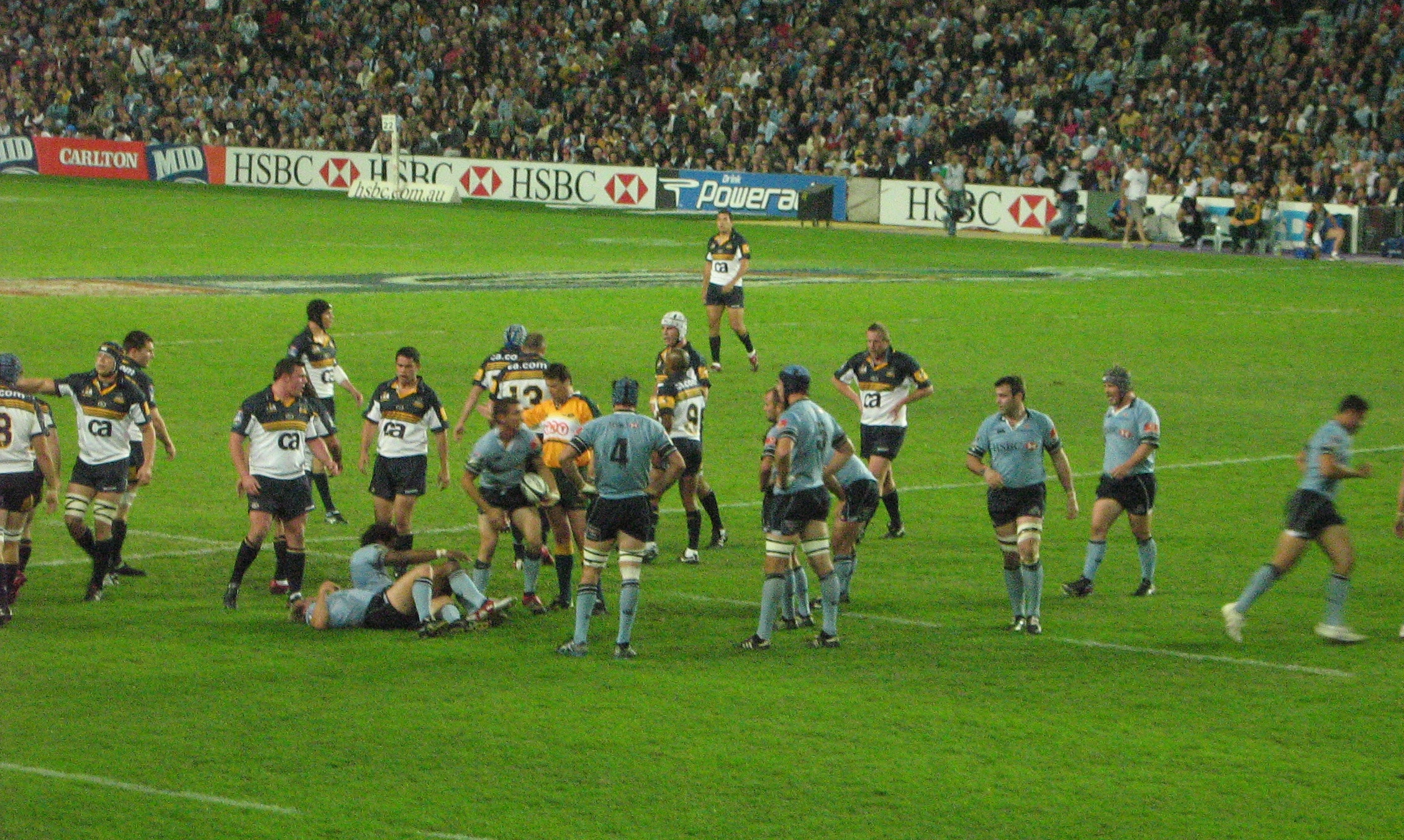
Waratahs host the Brumbies at Sydney Football Stadium, 16 April 2006. Dan Vickerman is wearing the #5 jersey for the Waratahs.

Traditionally, the ACT-NSW rivalry was dominated by home victories. Home field advantage was such a powerful factor in these games that the only Brumbies away loss in the 2000 Season was against the Waratahs. Of the sixteen games in the Super 12 and Super 14 eras, the home team won fourteen games. Dan Vickerman played for the winning team in both away victories in this period.

The Brumbies were the first to win two ACT-NSW games in a row, with the 2002 Semi Final and the 2003 regular season game. The 2002 Semi Final was also the first away win in the rivalry, a 51–10 win for the Brumbies at Sydney Football Stadium. The Waratahs had been so comprehensively beaten by the Crusaders the week before that pundits believed the Waratahs would struggle to be in the right state of mind for a semi-final. After winning the game, Brumbies coach David Nucifora agreed that the previous week had "derailed the Waratahs' season". The Brumbies successfully dominated the set piece in the first half but failed to capitalise in open play, only finding success in open play in the second half.

This game was only the fourth time a Super Rugby semi final had been lost by the host, with the Waratahs joining the Reds (1996 and 1999) and the Stormers (1999) in the list of losing hosts, and the Brumbies joining the Crusaders (1999), Highlanders (1999), and Sharks (1996) as winning visitors. Since this time, the Brumbies (2013), Crusaders (2011), Highlanders (2015), and Sharks (2012) have all won semi finals as visitors again, while the Bulls (2013), Stormers (2011 and 2012), and Waratahs (2015) have all lost as hosts.

18 May 2002	Waratahs	10 – 51	Brumbies	Sydney Football Stadium
19:40	Try: Staniforth 45'; Con: Burke 46' (1/1); Pen: Burke 4' (1/3)	Report; Summary; Recap	Try: Bond 24', 75'; Paul 51'; Finegan 58'; Harrison 66'; Howard 80'; Con: Walker 24' (1/1); Huxley 52', 59', 67', 75', 80' (5/5); Pen: Walker 12' (1/1); Huxley 43', 71' (2/2)	Attendance: 35,462; Referee: Paddy O'Brien

The Waratahs were the first to win three ACT-NSW games in a row, made possible when they won the first regular season away game in 2005. Waratahs head coach Ewen McKenzie engaged in "mind games" by parking the team bus as an "attack bus" at Brumbies Headquarters all week, mentally "getting in their space". Several Waratahs coaches and players believe this worked for different reasons:

- Chris Whitaker, the Waratahs' assistant coach, believed that the "attack bus" worked by getting in the heads of the Brumbies players, while spending an entire week in Canberra allowed the Waratahs players to relax and feel more comfortable.
- Lote Tuqiri, who started on the wing for the Waratahs, believes that playing down the "big brother – little brother" dynamic in the media took some motivation away from the Brumbies players. Jeremy Paul, who started at hooker for the Brumbies, dismissed this view, and believed that the changing dynamic between the teams was a sign that the younger Brumbies players had their own rivalry with the Waratahs, not simply inheriting a rivalry for its own sake.
- Peter Hewat, who started on the wing for the Waratahs, recalled that the media in Canberra were more affected by the "attack bus" than the Brumbies players, but that the media then put more pressure on the Brumbies as a result.
- Morgan Turinui, who started at outside centre for the Waratahs, believed that the "attack bus" was more of a metaphor for why they won than the reason, with the Waratahs' tactics to play for possession and "camp in the Brumbies territory".
- Tamaiti Horua, who started at number 8 for the Brumbies, believed that the Brumbies' success in 2005 was dependent on how successful they were at keeping the 2004 championship-winning players in the starting lineup. For a variety of reasons, only eight of the fifteen starting players for the Brumbies had started in that position in the 2004 final.

16 April 2005	Brumbies	6 – 10	Waratahs	Canberra Stadium
19:40	Pen: Giteau 14', 31' (2/3)	Report	Try: MacKay 23'; Con: Rogers 24' (1/1); Pen: Rogers 46' (1/2)	Attendance: 27,040; Referee: Mark Lawrence

=== Winning away from home (2011 – 2018) ===
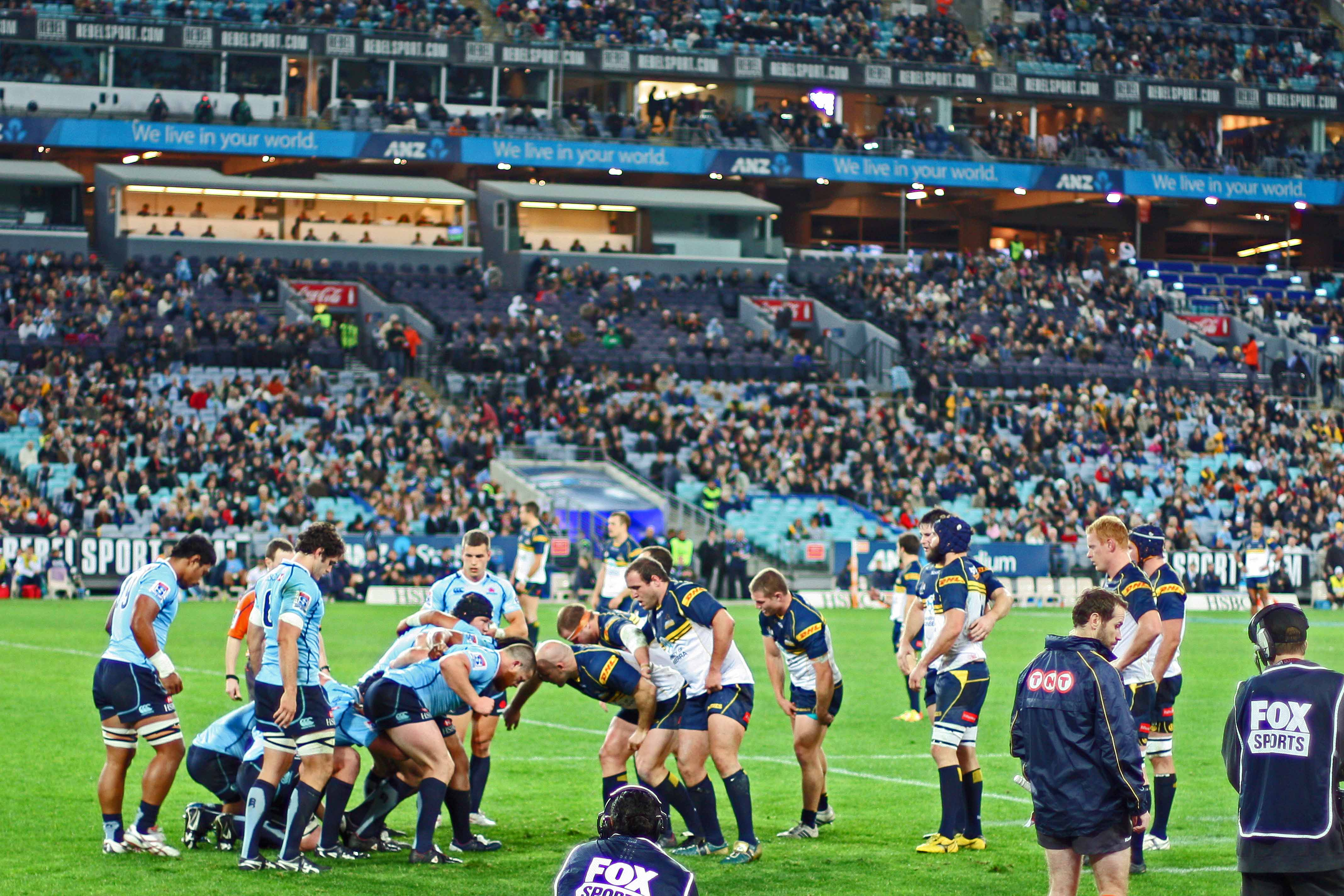
Brumbies and Waratahs prepare for a scrum in 2012. Ben Mowen and Dan Palmer, present in this shot, previously played for the Waratahs.

With the advent of the Super Rugby conference system in 2011, home dominance ceased to be as significant. The first clash in the Super 15 era saw the Waratahs win 29-22 at Canberra Stadium. Both teams had started the season with a good win, but had then fallen into terrible form and embarrassing losses. With the 2011 season being the worst in the Brumbies' history, having fired coach Andy Friend earlier in the month and going into the game with many players missing due to injury, many pundits had picked the Brumbies to lose despite their home field advantage. A try after the siren from Sitaleki Timani, a former Brumby, gave the Waratahs their second ever win in Canberra.

26 March 2011	Brumbies	22 – 29	Waratahs	Canberra Stadium, Canberra
19:40	Try: Ben Alexander 76'; Con: Giteau 77' (1/1); Pen: Giteau 11', 17', 33', 40', 48' (5/6)	Report	Try: Ryan Cross 60'; Sitaleki Timani 80'; Con: Kurtley Beale 62', 80' (2/2); Pen: Kurtley Beale 5', 20', 32', 40', 66' (5/6)	Attendance: 18,011; Referee: Marius Jonker

The Brumbies had their revenge the following year, with a 19-15 victory at Allianz Stadium.

7 July 2012	Waratahs	15 – 19	Brumbies	ANZ Stadium, Sydney
19:40	Try: Tatafu Polota-Nau 31'; Berrick Barnes 57'; Con: Berrick Barnes 58' (1/2); Pen: Berrick Barnes 50' (1/1)	Report	Try: Henry Speight 62'; Con: Zack Holmes 62' (1/1); Pen: Zack Holmes 13', 40' (2/3); Jesse Mogg 24', 65' (2/3)	Attendance: 22,844; Referee: Keith Brown

Between the round 12 clash in 2015 and the round 17 clash in 2019, the homes team lost six of the seven games.

=== Brumbies Ascendent (2019 – Present) ===
The Brumbies became the second team in Super Rugby history to win 200 games when they beat the Waratahs 24-23 in 2020.

== "Mindgames" ==
- Waratahs head coach Ewen McKenzie, who had played for both teams, infamously invoked "mindgames" by parking the Waratahs' team bus at the Brumbies' headquarters. The distraction paid off, with the "attack bus" getting credit for the Waratahs' 10–6 victory away from home.
- The narrative around the clash was revived in the late 2000s, with the Brumbies nickname of "the Real Madrid of Rugby" cited as originating in the Waratahs camp.
- After the Brumbies' horrific 2011 season, the Waratahs recruited Brumbies star players Rocky Elsom and Adam Ashley-Cooper; these players were subjected to constant booing from the crowd in the 2012 clash in Canberra, as many fans saw the players as either 'traitors' or 'stolen'.
- In 2014, Waratahs Head Coach Michael Cheika broke the door of the visiting Coach's box at Canberra Stadium, with the Brumbies ceremonially sending him the bill.
- Brumby Jack, the mascot for the Brumbies, was refused on-field access by the Waratahs for the 2014 semi final.
- Following further "mindgames" around the timing of naming the starting team, the Brumbies did not release their lineup for the fixture until kickoff in the Round 12 clash in 2015.

== Notable players for both teams ==
Several players have had successful periods playing for both clubs, including:

Criteria: (At least 20 games for both teams OR (Captain of one team and at least 20 games for the other)) AND (at least 50 games for one team OR at least 60 games combined for both teams)
Notable players to play for both the Brumbies and the Waratahs
Player	Brumbies Years	Brumbies Caps	Waratahs Years	Waratahs Caps
Adam Ashley-Cooper	2005 – 2011	78	2002 – 2015, 2019	76
Mitchell Chapman	2008 – 2011	40	2013 – 2015	35
Rocky Elsom	2010 – 2011	14	2003 – 2008, 2012	70
Justin Harrison	1997 – 2003, 2010	48	2004 – 2005	21
Stephen Hoiles	2007 – 2011	48	2004 – 2006, 2014 – 2015	58
**Michael Hooper**	2010 – 2012	31	2014 – Present	121
Matt Lucas	2018 – 2019	28	2013 – 2017	32
Ewen McKenzie	1996 – 1997	36	1987 – 1995	37
Ben Mowen	2012 – 2014	51	2008 – 2011	40
Tom Staniforth	2014 – 2017	22	2018 – 2020	40
Dan Vickerman	2001 – 2003	20	2004 – 2008, 2011	58

Updated 25 September 2021.
Players in bold are still playing for one of the two teams.

== Results ==
=== All Time Record ===
As at 1 June 2025.

Total Games	Brumbies Wins	Waratahs Wins	Brumbies Points	Waratahs Points
46	28 (60.9%)	18 (39.1%)	1227 (55.7%)	975 (44.3%)

=== Dan Vickerman Cup era ===
Brumbies Win	Waratahs Win	Draw

Season	Score	Winner	Venue	Attendance
2017 Game 1	28 – 12	Brumbies	Allianz Stadium	15,911
2018 Game 1	24 – 17	Waratahs	GIO Stadium	13,515
2018 Game 2	40 – 31	Brumbies	Allianz Stadium	17,155
2019 Game 1	19 – 13	Brumbies	GIO Stadium	12,112
2019 Game 2	35 – 24	Brumbies	Bankwest Stadium	12,016
2020 Game 1	47 – 14	Brumbies	GIO Stadium	8,167
2020 Game 2	24 – 23	Brumbies	ANZ Stadium	1,976
2020 Game 3	38 – 11	Brumbies	GIO Stadium	3,000
2021 Game 1	61 – 10	Brumbies	GIO Stadium	9,322
2021 Game 2	24 – 22	Brumbies	The SCG	7,486
2022 Game 1	27 – 20	Brumbies	GIO Stadium	6,273
2023 Game 1	31 – 25	Brumbies	Allianz Stadium	25,076
2023 Game 2	40 – 36	Brumbies	GIO Stadium	10,575
2024 Game 1	40 – 16	Brumbies	GIO Stadium	8,018
2024 Game 2	29 – 21	Brumbies	Allianz Stadium	12,562
2025 Game 1	28 – 23	Waratahs	Allianz Stadium	20,572
2025 Game 2	40 – 17	Brumbies	GIO Stadium	9,183

=== Pre-Dan Vickerman Cup ===
Brumbies Win	Waratahs Win	Draw

Season	Score	Winner	Venue	Attendance
1996 Game 1	44 – 10	Waratahs	Sydney Football Stadium	unknown
1997 Game 1	56 – 9	Brumbies	Canberra Stadium	unknown
1998 Game 1	32 – 7	Waratahs	Sydney Football Stadium	unknown
1999 Game 1	27 – 16	Brumbies	Canberra Stadium	unknown
2000 Game 1	30 – 25	Waratahs	Sydney Football Stadium	33,987
2001 Game 1	48 – 21	Brumbies	Canberra Stadium	unknown
2002 Game 1	19 – 11	Waratahs	Sydney Football Stadium	41,645
2002 Semi Final	51 – 10	Brumbies	ANZ Stadium	35,462
2003 Game 1	41 – 15	Brumbies	Canberra Stadium	25,122
2004 Game 1	37 – 29	Waratahs	Sydney Football Stadium	37,832
2005 Game 1	10 – 6	Waratahs	Canberra Stadium	27,040
2006 Game 1	37 – 14	Waratahs	Sydney Football Stadium	36,656
2007 Game 1	36 – 10	Brumbies	Canberra Stadium	23,097
2008 Game 1	24 – 17	Waratahs	Sydney Football Stadium	32,371
2009 Game 1	21 – 11	Brumbies	Canberra Stadium	21,594
2010 Game 1	19 – 12	Waratahs	ANZ Stadium	40,271
2011 Game 1	29 – 22	Waratahs	Canberra Stadium	18,011
2011 Game 2	41 – 7	Waratahs	ANZ Stadium	28,276
2012 Game 1	23 – 6	Brumbies	Canberra Stadium	19,122
2012 Game 2	19 – 15	Brumbies	ANZ Stadium	22,844
2013 Game 1	35 – 6	Brumbies	Canberra Stadium	20,027
2013 Game 2	28 – 22	Waratahs	ANZ Stadium	21,817
2014 Game 1	28 – 23	Brumbies	GIO Stadium	17,016
2014 Game 2	39 – 8	Waratahs	ANZ Stadium	29,132
2014 Semi Final	26 – 8	Waratahs	Sydney Football Stadium	38,800
2015 Game 1	28 – 13	Waratahs	Allianz Stadium	27,469
2015 Game 2	13 – 10	Waratahs	GIO Stadium	17,563
2016 Game 1	32 – 15	Brumbies	GIO Stadium	20,141
2016 Game 2	26 – 20	Brumbies	Allianz Stadium	25,319

== See also ==
- Templeton Cup, annual trophy contested between the Queensland Reds and New South Wales Waratahs since 2000
- Rod Macqueen Cup, rugby union trophy contested biannually between the Brumbies and the Queensland Reds
- Weary Dunlop Shield, (2011–2024), defunct rivalry shield held between the Rebels and Waratahs
