= Gordon Hunter Memorial Trophy =

The Gordon Hunter Memorial Trophy is a rugby union challenge trophy contested between the Auckland-based Blues and Dunedin-based Highlanders in the Super Rugby. The trophy is awarded in memory of Gordon Hunter, who had been head coach of both teams prior to his death in 2002. Hunter was the head coach in the Highlanders' inaugural Super 12 season.

== History ==
Hunter was held in high regard and in 2020, Highlanders' coach Aaron Mauger noted that he gave players the courage to "really back themselves", while co-captain at the time, Aaron Smith said he was motivated by the trophy and "we would like nothing more to keep the Gordy Hunter at home". One commentator said that while Hunter "may have been a Southlander by birth... he was an Otago man at heart".

The trophy was first played for in 2002 with the Highlanders winning 20–13. Prior to 2011, the trophy was contested every time the two teams met, but with the introduction of the conference system meaning there are two meetings per regular season, the decision was made that the trophy would only be contested in matches hosted by the holders. While the Blues scored non-trophy-match wins over the Highlanders in the 2013 and 2014 seasons, the Highlanders won both home and away in 2015 on their way to lifting the Super Rugby title. As of 2023, the Blues currently hold the trophy, since earning it in 2020's Super Rugby Aotearoa, and defeating the Highlanders 16–9.

== Past winners ==
The following table summarises the results between the two sides since the trophy was first contested in 2002. 2016 was the first season in which the Gordon Hunter Memorial Trophy could not be contested due to the Blues only playing the Highlanders once – not in the host city of the current holders.

- (Brackets) denotes total matches the cup was held.

No.	Season	Date	Venue	Score	Winner	Ref.
Annual trophy (2002–2010)
1	2002	3 May	Eden Park, Auckland	13–20	Highlanders (1)	
2	2003	4 April	Carisbrook, Dunedin	22–11	Highlanders (2)	
3	2004	8 May	Eden Park, Auckland	50–22	Blues (1)	
4	2005	25 February	Carisbrook, Dunedin	14–30	Blues (2)	
5	2006	17 February	Carisbrook, Dunedin	25–13	Highlanders (3)	
6	2007	2 March	Eden Park, Auckland	28–9	Blues (3)	
7	2008	10 May	Carisbrook, Dunedin	15–40	Blues (4)	
8	2009	17 April	Eden Park, Auckland	26–6	Blues (5)	
9	2010	19 February	Carisbrook, Dunedin	15–19	Blues (6)	
Challenge trophy (since 2011)
10	2011	29 April	Carisbrook, Dunedin	10–15	Blues (7)	
11	2011	17 June	Eden Park, Auckland	33–16	Blues (8)	
12	2012	26 May	Eden Park, Auckland	20–27	Highlanders (4)	
13	2013	1 June	Forsyth Barr Stadium, Dunedin	38–28	Highlanders (5)	
14	2014	22 February	Forstyh Barr Stadium, Dunedin	29–21	Highlanders (6)	
15	2015	18 April	Forsyth Barr Stadium, Dunedin	30–24	Highlanders (7)	
16	2017	8 April	Forsyth Barr Stadium, Dunedin	26–20	Highlanders (8)	
17	2018	23 February	Forsyth Barr Stadium, Dunedin	41–34	Highlanders (9)	
18	2019	20 April	Forsyth Barr Stadium, Dunedin	24–12	Highlanders (10)	
—N/a	~~2020~~	~~2 May~~	~~Forsyth Barr Stadium, Dunedin~~	Cancelled		
19	2020 (NZ)	2 August	Forsyth Barr Stadium, Dunedin	21–32	Blues (9)	
20	2021 (NZ)	14 March	Eden Park, Auckland	39–17	Blues (10)	
21	2022	11 March	North Harbour Stadium, Albany	32–20	Blues (11)	
22	2023	2 June	Eden Park, Auckland	16–9	Blues (12)	
23	2024	18 May	Eden Park, Auckland	47–13	Blues (13)	
24	2026	17 April	Eden Park, Auckland	47–40	Blues (14)	
