= Super Rugby AU =

Rugby Union Competition

- Most recent season or competition: 2021 Super Rugby AU season
- Sport: Rugby union
- First season: 2020
- Folded: 2021
- No. of teams: 5
- Country: Australia
- Last champions: Reds (2021; 1st title)
- Most titles: Brumbies (1 title); Reds (1 title)
- Broadcasters: Fox Sports Australia (2020); Nine Network (2021)
- Sponsors: Vodafone (2020); Harvey Norman (2021)
- Related competitions: Super Rugby Trans-Tasman; Super Rugby Aotearoa; Super Rugby Unlocked
- Website: SuperRugby.com

Super Rugby AU, formerly named the Harvey Norman Super Rugby AU for sponsorship purposes, was a rugby union competition organised by Rugby Australia (RA). The competition was created to supplant the 2020 Super Rugby season, which had been suspended in March due to the COVID-19 pandemic. Due to ongoing international travel restrictions relating to the pandemic, the competition was continued with a second season in 2021. The competition features the four Australian Super Rugby teams from the Australian conference, with the addition of the Western Force, in a round-robin tournament over a 12-week period, made up of 10 rounds, a qualifying final and a final.

== Background and history ==
In March 2020, after seven rounds had concluded in the 2020 Super Rugby season, SANZAAR, the body which oversees the Super Rugby, announced the cancellation of the competition for the "foreseeable future". The decision to suspend the competition was prompted by the New Zealand government's announcement that people entering the country from trips overseas would have to self-isolate for 14 days, making the inter-continental competition untenable to continue. By May, New Zealand Rugby (NZR) had announced the launch of a domestic competition consisting of its five Super Rugby teams to run for ten weeks. Shortly thereafter, Rugby Australia (RA) announced the launch of its own domestic competition consisting of all four of their Super Rugby teams with the addition of former Perth-based Super Rugby team the Western Force. The Japan-based Sunwolves team, whom had been in the Super Rugby since the 2016 season and were to be axed from the competition at the end of the 2020 season, were also touted as potential participants. RA had stated that it hoped the competition would begin in July at the earliest, although no dates were confirmed. In late May 2020, the Western Force were confirmed to be a part of the new interim Super Rugby AU competition. After working with the Sunwolves on potential inclusion, RA announced that the team would not be taking part as COVID-19 rules made it too difficult.

The first season of the Super Rugby AU was confirmed in June 2020. Scheduled for kick-off on 3 July 2020, the inaugural season saw each team play each other twice in a home-and-away format across ten-weeks (notably the shortest professional rugby season in Australian history), with a finals series to decide the season champions. The competition was given the greenlight after Rugby Australia confirmed a new broadcast deal with Fox Sports Australia.

Alongside the revamped Australian domestic Super Rugby competition, Rugby Australia announced seven law variations that would be trialed throughout the 2020 season, including a 20-minute red card (rather than the permanent sin bin), Super Time: an analogous law to football's golden goal rule, and the 50/22, a line-out throw given to the defending team if they kick it into the opposition's 22 metre line from behind the half-way point (50 metre). The latter rule was later adopted by World Rugby in 2021.

The inaugural champions were the Brumbies. Starting the season with four consecutive wins, the Brumbies established a seven-point buffer between themselves and the team in second position (Reds) by the halfway point. They finished the regular season in first position and went on to win the Grand Final at home against the Reds, 28–23. It was their first Super Rugby-related title since 2004. In 2021 the Reds, whom almost pulled off a perfect season by winning seven-straight matches, including a double against their Grand Final opponents from the previous season, and a record win over arch-rivals the Waratahs in the first round, booked themselves into a home Grand Final after just nine rounds. The Reds lost by three points against the Western Force in the final round before hosting a Grand Final rematch from the previous season. The Reds won 19–16 at Lang Park in front of 41,000 spectators, the biggest crowd for an Australian derby since the Templeton Cup clash between the Reds and Waratahs in 2004.

In August 2021, Rugby Australia and New Zealand Rugby co-launched the Super Rugby Pacific, a reconfigured 12-team competition, which included all of Australia and New Zealand's Super Rugby franchises as well as a Fijian team and a New Zealand-based Pacific Islands team.

== Teams ==

Team	Union	Established	Location	Region
Brumbies	ACT and Southern NSW Rugby Union	1995; 31 years ago	Canberra, Australian Capital Territory	Australian Capital Territory and Southern New South Wales
Force	Western Australia Rugby Union	2005; 21 years ago	Perth, Western Australia	Western Australia
Rebels	Victorian Rugby Union	2009; 17 years ago	Melbourne, Victoria	Victoria
Reds	Queensland Rugby Union	1882; 144 years ago	Brisbane, Queensland	Queensland
Waratahs	New South Wales Rugby Union	1882; 144 years ago	Sydney, New South Wales	Central and Northern New South Wales

== Champions ==
=== Grand Finals ===
List of Super Rugby AU Grand Finals
Season	Winners	Score	Runners-up	Venue	Attendance
2020	Brumbies	28–23	Reds	Canberra Stadium, Bruce	6,000
2021	Reds	19–16	Brumbies	Lang Park, Milton	41,637

== Broadcasting and sponsorship ==
=== Sponsorship ===
The 2020 tournament was run by Rugby Australia with the sponsorship of Foxtel which provided television coverage on its Fox Sports channels with Vodafone (Australia) being the naming rights sponsor. Gilbert is the official supplier of all rugby balls. Ahead of the 2021 season, Foxtel and Vodafone ended their sponsorship agreements, with Nine Network and Stan Sports providing the television coverage. Ahead of the start of the 2021 season, Rugby Australia announced a naming right sponsorship deal with retail company Harvey Norman.

=== Television ===
During the 2020 season, all matches were televised live by affiliate partners Fox Sports. Following Rugby Australia's broadcast deal with Nine Network, all games will be broadcast on streaming service Stan, with one game a round being simulcast on Nine's flagship free to air channel.

== See also ==
- Super Rugby Trans-Tasman
- Super Rugby Aotearoa
- Super Rugby Unlocked
