= David Gibson (rugby union) =

New Zealand rugby union player (born 1980)

- Full name: David Barton Gibson
- Born: 4 January 1980 (age 46) Hāwera, New Zealand
- Height: 5 ft 9 in (175 cm)
- Weight: 191 lb (87 kg)

Rugby union career
- Position: Half-back
Provincial / State sides
Years	Team	Apps	(Points)
1999–02	Otago	16	(15)
2002–04	Auckland	30	(25)
2006	Northland	10	(5)
Super Rugby
Years	Team	Apps	(Points)
2001–02	Highlanders	7	(0)
2003–07	Blues	33	(30)

David Barton Gibson (born 4 January 1980) is a New Zealand former professional rugby union player.

== Biography ==
Born in Hāwera, Gibson made the occasional Super 12 appearance off the bench for the Highlanders in 2001 and 2002, before getting more regular game time after crossing to the Blues, where he shared the half-back position with All Black Steve Devine. He was the Blues half-back for the entire 2003 Super 12 final win over the Crusaders.

Gibson earned NZ Māori representative honours in 2003, including on a tour of Canada.

A neck injury suffered while training in 2005 required multiple surgeries and was ultimately career ending.

Gibson is a former Chief Executive of the North Harbour Rugby Union.
