= Gordon Hunter (rugby union, born 1949) =

New Zealand rugby union player, coach and selector

Gordon Rowland Robert Hunter (1949 – 9 March 2002) was a New Zealand rugby union player, coach and selector.

== Early life and education ==
Hunter was raised in rural Southland, and educated at Southland Boys' High School from 1963 to 1967.

== Rugby career ==
Hunter was a member of the Southland Boys' High School rugby 1st XV in 1967. He played wing and the school magazine noted that "on his day his tackles were bone- and morale-shattering." After leaving school, Hunter moved to Dunedin and joined the Zingari-Richmond club where he came under the influence of renowned coach Eric Watson. He made a couple of appearances for Otago before a workplace accident left him without his left eye. He subsequently made a career as a coach and selector, coaching Otago from 1992 to 1995, the Otago Highlanders in the 1996 Super 12 competition, and retired from coaching the Auckland Blues in 2001. Hunter was named as assistant All Blacks coach in 1996 and 1997 and an All Blacks selector from 1996 to 1999. He died in Dunedin of cancer in 2002 at the age of 52.

== Legacy ==
Since 2002 in Super Rugby, the Gordon Hunter Memorial Trophy has been contested annually between the Blues and Highlanders. In 2020, the Highlander's coach Aaron Mauger noted the positive qualities that Hunter had demonstrated and co-captain Aaron Smith said that he "cared for his players...[and]...trusted you play your game but also was a bit of a character off the field." Writing in the Spinoff in 2017, Scotty Stevenson recounted several humorous stories about Hunter outside of rugby, concluding, "in essence, he was a coach who loved the game and even more so the boys who played it for him. He was the Detective who left his own fingerprints on New Zealand’s national sport." Tony Brown said [Hunter] shaped the way he coached and his impact was because he was respected [and] "a team first man and someone that was super loyal to all his players and all his players loved him for it and performed for him."
