= Templeton Cup =

Australian rugby union competition

- Sport: Rugby union
- Location: New South Wales; Queensland
- Teams: 2
- First meeting: 1 April 2000; 26 years ago
- Latest meeting: 14 March 2026; 6 months ago

Statistics
- All-time record: Waratahs (21); Reds (20)
- Largest victory: Reds 41–7 Waratahs (19 February 2021)
- Smallest victory: Waratahs 26–27 Reds (31 May 2024)
- Longest win streak: Waratahs, 11 (1 March 2014 – 3 July 2020)

The Templeton Cup, frequently referred to as the Bob Templeton Cup, is an annual rugby union trophy contested between the Australian teams of the New South Wales Waratahs and the Queensland Reds in the Super Rugby. The trophy, which was established in 2000 ahead of the Super 12 season, was named in honour of Bob Templeton, former Queensland and Australia representative player and coach who died in December 1999.

== Results ==
=== Overview ===
Details	Played	Won by Waratahs	Won by Reds	Drawn	Waratahs points	Reds points
In New South Wales	19	11	8	0	490	335
In Queensland	22	10	12	0	437	538
Overall	41	21	20	0	927	873

=== Pre-Templeton Cup record ===
Super 12 (pre-Templeton Cup) record
Season	Date	Venue	Score	Winner	Attendance	Ref.
1996	14 April	Ballymore Stadium, Herston	15–13	Reds	22,296	
1997	19 April	Sydney Football Stadium, Moore Park	16–26	Reds	30,106	
1998	18 April	Ballymore Stadium, Herston	17–17	draw	23,250	
1999	1 May	Sydney Football Stadium, Moore Park	13–30	Reds	28,360	

=== List ===
- (Brackets) denotes total matches the cup was held.

No.	Season	Date	Venue	Score	Winner	Attendance	Ref.
1	2000	1 April	Ballymore Stadium, Herston	31–16	Reds (1)	22,000	
2	2001	12 May	Sydney Football Stadium, Moore Park	20–25	Reds (2)	—N/a	
3	2002	5 May	Ballymore Stadium, Herston	31–24	Reds (3)	23,000	
4	2003	29 March	Sydney Football Stadium, Moore Park	23–35	Reds (4)	—N/a	
5	2004	8 May	Lang Park, Milton	23–7	Reds (5)	42,237	
6	2005	6 May	Stadium Australia, Sydney Olympic Park	27–8	Waratahs (1)	38,220	
7	2006	11 February	Lang Park, Milton	12–16	Waratahs (2)	38,000	
8	2007	14 April	Sydney Football Stadium, Moore Park	26–13	Waratahs (3)	21,872	
9	2008	17 May	Lang Park, Milton	11–18	Waratahs (4)	27,688	
10	2009	6 March	Sydney Football Stadium, Moore Park	15–11	Waratahs (5)	28,109	
11	2010	13 February	Lang Park, Milton	28–30	Waratahs (6)	22,582	
12	2011	26 February	Stadium Australia, Sydney Olympic Park	30–6	Waratahs (7)	33,846	
13	2011	23 April	Lang Park, Milton	19–15	Reds (6)	35,828	
14	2012	25 February	Stadium Australia, Sydney Olympic Park	21–25	Reds (7)	32,071	
15	2012	14 July	Lang Park, Milton	32–16	Reds (8)	41,533	
16	2013	23 February	Lang Park, Milton	25–17	Reds (9)	35,801	
17	2013	13 July	Stadium Australia, Sydney Olympic Park	12–14	Reds (10)	26,037	
18	2014	1 March	Stadium Australia, Sydney Olympic Park	32–5	Waratahs (8)	17,580	
19	2014	12 July	Lang Park, Milton	3–34	Waratahs (9)	36,205	
20	2015	7 March	Lang Park, Milton	5–23	Waratahs (10)	27,199	
21	2015	13 June	Sydney Football Stadium, Moore Park	31–5	Waratahs (11)	26,746	
22	2016	27 February	Sydney Football Stadium, Moore Park	30–10	Waratahs (12)	24,044	
23	2016	27 March	Lang Park, Milton	13–15	Waratahs (13)	17,247	
24	2017	29 April	Lang Park, Milton	26–29	Waratahs (14)	18,781	
25	2018	14 April	Sydney Cricket Ground, Moore Park	37–16	Waratahs (15)	15,648	
26	2018	2 June	Lang Park, Milton	41–52	Waratahs (16)	14,452	
27	2019	9 March	Sydney Cricket Ground, Moore Park	28–17	Waratahs (17)	15,681	
28	2019	18 May	Lang Park, Milton	32–40	Waratahs (18)	12,236	
—N/a	~~2020~~	~~18 April~~	~~Western Sydney Stadium, Parramatta~~	Cancelled			
—N/a	~~2020~~	~~16 May~~	~~Lang Park, Milton~~	Cancelled			
29	2020 (AU)	3 July	Lang Park, Milton	32–26	Reds (11)	5,590 (Note: Attendances throughout 2020 and 2021 had various restrictions due to the COVID-19 pandemic in Australia.)	
30	2020 (AU)	8 August	Sydney Cricket Ground, Moore Park	45–12	Waratahs (19)	1,770	
31	2021 (AU)	19 February	Lang Park, Milton	41–7	Reds (12)	12,213	
32	2021 (AU)	27 March	Stadium Australia, Sydney Olympic Park	14–46	Reds (13)	4,381	
33	2022	25 February	Leichhardt Oval, Lilyfield	16–20	Reds (14)	4,806	
34	2022	26 March	Lang Park, Milton	32–20	Reds (15)	11,219	
35	2023	6 May	North Queensland Stadium, Townsville	24–32	Waratahs (20)	5,942	
36	2024	24 February	Lang Park, Milton	40–22	Reds (16)	14,593	
37	2024	31 May	Sydney Football Stadium, Moore Park	26–27	Reds (17)	12,018	
38	2025	15 March	Lang Park, Milton	35–15	Reds (18)	20,072	
39	2025	9 May	Sydney Football Stadium, Moore Park	21–28	Reds (19)	18,945	
40	2026	13 February	Sydney Football Stadium, Moore Park	36–12	Waratahs (21)	16,655	
41	2026	14 March	Lang Park, Milton	26–17	Reds (20)	18,087	

== See also ==
- Rod Macqueen Cup, annual trophy match contested between the ACT Brumbies and Reds
- Dan Vickerman Cup, rivalry trophy held between the ACT Brumbies and Waratahs
- Weary Dunlop Shield (2011–2024), defunct rivalry shield held between the Rebels and Waratahs
