= Weary Dunlop Shield =

Annual Australian rugby union match

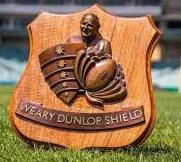
- The Weary Dunlop Shield

- Melbourne Rebels New South Wales Waratahs
- Sport: Rugby union
- Location: Melbourne, Victoria; Sydney, New South Wales
- Teams: 2
- First meeting: 18 February 2011; 15 years ago
- Latest meeting: 29 March 2024; 2 years ago

Statistics
- Total meetings: 26
- All-time record: New South Wales Waratahs (18); Melbourne Rebels (8)
- Largest victory: New South Wales Waratahs, 43–0 (18 February 2011)
- Smallest victory: Melbourne Rebels, 24–22 (24 May 2013); New South Wales Waratahs, 18–16 (25 April 2015)
- Longest win streak: New South Wales Waratahs, 6 (24 March 2017 – 31 May 2019)

The Weary Dunlop Shield was an annual Australian domestic rugby union match contested between the Victorian team, Melbourne Rebels, and the New South Welsh team, New South Wales Waratahs, between 2011 and 2024. Played within the Super Rugby competition, the two teams typically played each other twice a year, with the winner of each match being awarded the Weary Dunlop Shield. Created in 2011 upon the arrival of the expansion team Melbourne Rebels, the match was contested a total of twenty-six times. The New South Wales Waratahs have won majority of the fixtures (18).

The Weary Dunlop Shield effectively ended when the Melbourne Rebels were withdrawn from the Super Rugby following the 2024 season.

== Weary Dunlop ==
The namesake of the match, Sir Edward “Weary” Dunlop (1907–1993), was an Australian surgeon, former Colonel in the Australian Army during World War II, and former prisoner of war with vast honours. Dunlop was also a keen rugby union player who became the first Victorian-born Australia representative, hailing from Wangaratta. Dunlop made his international debut against New Zealand at the Sydney Cricket Ground in 1932. He played across several forward positions and made a total of two appearances for Australia.

== Results ==
=== Overview ===
Details	Played	Won by Rebels	Won by Waratahs	Drawn	Rebels points	Waratahs points
In Victoria	11	4	7	0	247	313
In New South Wales	15	4	11	0	334	437
Overall	26	8 (30.77%)	18 (69.23%)	0	581	750

=== List ===
- (Brackets) denotes total matches the shield was held.

No.	Season	Date	Venue	Score	Winner	Ref.
1	2011	18 February	Melbourne Rectangular Stadium, Melbourne	0–43	New South Wales Waratahs (1)	
2	2011	20 April	Sydney Football Stadium, Sydney	28–9	New South Wales Waratahs (2)	
3	2012	2 March	Melbourne Rectangular Stadium, Melbourne	19–35	New South Wales Waratahs (3)	
4	2012	21 April	Sydney Football Stadium, Sydney	30–21	New South Wales Waratahs (4)	
5	2013	1 March	Sydney Football Stadium, Sydney	31–26	New South Wales Waratahs (5)	
6	2013	24 May	Melbourne Rectangular Stadium, Melbourne	24–22	Melbourne Rebels (1)	
7	2014	21 March	Sydney Football Stadium, Sydney	32–8	New South Wales Waratahs (6)	
8	2014	23 May	Melbourne Rectangular Stadium, Melbourne	19–41	New South Wales Waratahs (7)	
9	2015	20 February	Melbourne Rectangular Stadium, Melbourne	28–38	New South Wales Waratahs (8)	
10	2015	25 April	Stadium Australia, Sydney	18–16	New South Wales Waratahs (9)	
11	2016	3 April	Sydney Football Stadium, Sydney	17–21	Melbourne Rebels (2)	
12	2017	24 March	Melbourne Rectangular Stadium, Melbourne	25–32	New South Wales Waratahs (10)	
13	2017	21 May	Sydney Football Stadium, Sydney	50–23	New South Wales Waratahs (11)	
14	2018	18 March	Sydney Football Stadium, Sydney	51–27	New South Wales Waratahs (12)	
15	2018	29 June	Melbourne Rectangular Stadium, Melbourne	26–31	New South Wales Waratahs (13)	
16	2019	20 April	Sydney Cricket Ground, Sydney	23–20	New South Wales Waratahs (14)	
17	2019	31 May	Melbourne Rectangular Stadium, Melbourne	15–20	New South Wales Waratahs (15)	
18	2020	14 February	Melbourne Rectangular Stadium, Melbourne	24–10	Melbourne Rebels (3)	
—N/a	2020	~~2 May~~	~~Brookvale Oval, Sydney~~	Cancelled		
19	2020 (AU)	24 July	Sydney Cricket Ground, Sydney	10–29	Melbourne Rebels (4)	
20	2020 (AU)	29 August	Leichhardt Oval, Sydney (Note: Although played in Sydney's Leichhardt Oval, the Melbourne Rebels were the nominal home team due to complications around the COVID-19 pandemic in Victoria.)	32–38	New South Wales Waratahs (16)	
21	2021 (AU)	19 March	Melbourne Rectangular Stadium, Melbourne	33–14	Melbourne Rebels (5)	
22	2021 (AU)	24 April	Western Sydney Stadium, Sydney	25–36	Melbourne Rebels (6)	
23	2022	19 March	Sydney Cricket Ground, Sydney	24–19	New South Wales Waratahs (17)	
24	2023	10 March	Melbourne Rectangular Stadium, Melbourne	34–27	Melbourne Rebels (7)	
25	2023	13 May	Sydney Football Stadium, Sydney	38–20	New South Wales Waratahs (18)	
26	2024	29 March	Sydney Football Stadium, Sydney	21–27	Melbourne Rebels (8)	

== See also ==
- Dan Vickerman Cup, annual match contested between the ACT Brumbies and the New South Wales Waratahs.
- Templeton Cup, annual trophy contested between the Queensland Reds and New South Wales Waratahs since 2000
- Rod Macqueen Cup, rugby union trophy contested biannually between the Brumbies and the Queensland Reds
