= Rod Macqueen Cup =

Rugby Union competition between ACT Brumbies and Queensland Reds

- Awarded for: Winning the biannual ACT Brumbies versus Queensland Reds match.
- Country: Australia
- Presented by: Rugby Australia

History
- First award: 2005
- Most recent: ACT Brumbies

The Rod Macqueen Cup is a rugby union trophy contested biannually in Super Rugby between the ACT Brumbies and the Queensland Reds. The Rod Macqueen Cup was introduced in 2005 to celebrate Rod Macqueen, the first Brumbies head coach.

== Rod Macqueen ==
=== End of the Amateur Era ===
One of Macqueen's first major coaching positions was at the NSW Waratahs, from 1991 to 1992. In 1992, 1994, and 1995, he was also a selector for the Wallabies, the Australian national team.

=== ACT Brumbies ===
Rod Macqueen was the first head coach of the ACT Brumbies in 1996. He led them to the 4th best win-loss record in the competition that year, only missing out on a finals berth due to the Natal Sharks winning a superior number of bonus points. The ACT Brumbies were one of only two teams to beat the Queensland Reds in the regular season. Macqueen's 1996 Brumbies were the only team to beat Queensland, Natal, and the Auckland Blues.

In 1997, Macqueen led the ACT Brumbies to the Grand Final against the Auckland Blues. Joe Roff scored all the Brumbies' points in a 23–7 defeat.

=== Wallabies Head Coach ===
Macqueen was appointed the head coach of the Wallabies in September 1997, and would coach them until 2001. He led the Wallabies to victory at the 1999 Rugby World Cup in Wales, where they defeated France in the final, becoming the first nation to ever win the Rugby World Cup twice. The following year Australia won the Tri Nations Series for the first time.

Macqueen retired from the game after guiding the Wallabies to a victory over the highly rated 2001 Lions side captained by Martin Johnson. He finished his career as the Australian coach with a test match winning record of just below 80%. His achievements with the Wallabies led many people to believe that he is one of the talented coaches in the professional era.

Macqueen received an Australian Sports Medal in 2000. was inducted into the Sport Australia Hall of Fame in 2001. and was made a Member of the Order of Australia in 2003. In 2004 he was awarded the Joe French Award, which recognizes outstanding service to the Australian Rugby Union. Macqueen was inducted into the IRB Hall of Fame in October 2011, alongside all other Rugby World Cup-winning head coaches and captains through the 2007 edition.

== History of the Rivalry ==
=== Super 12 to Super 14 (1996 – 2009) ===
Despite producing many talented Wallabies in the first fifteen years of professionalism, such as Jason Little, Chris Latham, Toutai Kefu, Tim Horan, Daniel Herbert, Michael Foley, Elton Flatley, John Eales, Dan Crowley, John Roe, Ben Tune, and David Wilson, the Queensland Reds only defeated the ACT Brumbies once in the first fifteen years of their rivalry, with a 19-18 victory at Ballymore Stadium in 1999.

12 March 1999	Queensland Reds	19 – 18	ACT Brumbies	Ballymore Stadium, Brisbane
	Try: Daniel Herbert 24'; Con: Nathan Spooner 25' (1/1); Pen: Nathan Spooner 11', 40', 44', 82' (4/5); Cards: Toutai Kefu (yellow card) 22' to 32'		Try: Jim Williams 4', 30'; Con: Stirling Mortlock 31' (1/2); Pen: Stirling Mortlock 17', 28' (2/3); Cards: Gordon Falcon (yellow card) 43' to 53'	Referee: Peter Marshall

Queensland's 1999 win was enough to give them a top-of-the-table finish in 1999, and prevented the ACT Brumbies from reaching the playoffs.

The most significant clash in the early rivalry between these teams was the 2001 Semi Final. This was Queensland's last playoff appearance for a decade.

19 May 2001	ACT Brumbies	30 – 6	Queensland Reds	Bruce Stadium, Canberra
19:40 (UTC+10)	Try: Stirling Mortlock 39'; Owen Finegan 50'; Jeremy Paul 78'; Con: Andrew Walker 39', 50', 78' (3/3); Pen: Andrew Walker 60', 68' (2/2); Drop: Stephen Larkham 80' (1/1)	Report	Pen: Elton Flatley 10' (1/1); Shane Drahm 37' (1/1)	Attendance: 25,273; Referee: Paddy O'Brien

The Rod Macqueen Cup was introduced in 2005 to celebrate Rod Macqueen. The ACT Brumbies were the first to win the Rod Macqueen Cup, and proceeded to retain it all through Super 14.

=== The end of Super 14 and the start of the Conference System (2010 – 2014) ===
The four years that Ewen McKenzie, who played for the Brumbies in Super 12, was coach of the Reds was the high water mark of the rivalry. In 2010, 2012, and 2013, the Rod Macqueen Cup games decided whether either the Brumbies or the Reds made the playoff. In 2010, the Rod Macqueen Cup game was the difference between the Reds finishing 4th (in the playoffs) and 5th (not in the playoffs). In 2012 and 2013, if the losing team had won just one of the Rod Macqueen Cup games, they would have won the conference ahead of the other.

In 2011, the Queensland Reds won their second game against the Brumbies. Despite scoring four tries, the Brumbies were only able to convert one, while Quade Cooper kicked seven penalty goals, a drop goal, and converted the Reds' only try for an individual haul of 26 points, enough to beat the Brumbies on his own, and more points in a game than any Brumby has ever scored.

5 March 2011	Brumbies	25 – 31	Reds	Bruce Stadium, Canberra
19:40 (UTC+11)	Try: Stephen Moore 18'; Pat McCabe 30'; Ita Vaea 42'; Ben Alexander 74'; Con: Matt Giteau 18' (1/4); Pen: Matt Giteau 37' (1/1)	Report	Try: Scott Higginbotham 12'; Con: Quade Cooper 12' (1/1); Pen: Quade Cooper 2', 23', 29', 38', 52', 55', 69' (7/9); Drop: Quade Cooper 34' (1/1); Cards: Ben Daley (yellow card) 37' to 47'	Attendance: 16,027; Referee: Mark Lawrence

However, the Reds were unable to win the Rod Macqueen Cup in 2011, as the Brumbies won a famous underdog victory in the return game. The Brumbies were in the middle of their worst season, while the Reds would win the 2011 Super Rugby Final, and yet the Brumbies played one of the best defensive performances of the season to continually frustrate the Reds and prevent them from playing their game. The game ended in controversy when the Brumbies won a penalty after the siren. Brumbies captain Matt Giteau chose to attempt the penalty goal, while Stephen Moore, a former Queensland Red, told Giteau to kick it out so the Reds could have the losing bonus point for finishing within seven points. Giteau was clearly heard on the broadcast telling Moore "f**k off, I'm the captain.", which many fans consider to be illustrative of both men's captaincies: Giteau the authoritarian, Moore too nice to his opposition.

4 June 2011	Reds	14 – 22	Brumbies	Bruce Stadium, Canberra
19:40 (UTC+10)	Try: Ben Lucas 36'; Con: Quade Cooper (0/1); Pen: Quade Cooper 5', 9', 56' (3/4)	Report	Try: Stephen Moore 19'; Con: Matt Giteau 19' (1/1); Pen: Matt Giteau 2', 7', 18', 31', 82' (5/5); Drop: Matt Giteau (0/2)	Attendance: 27,374; Referee: Garratt Williamson

The Reds won the Rod Macqueen Cup for the first time in 2012, beating the Brumbies in Canberra and in Brisbane to win as many games against the Brumbies in one year as they had in their entire history. However, the Brumbies won it back with a win and a draw in 2013. The draw in 2013 was played in front of the largest crowd to ever watch a Rod Macqueen Cup game, a testament to the status of the rivalry at that time.

20 April 2013	Reds	19 – 19	Brumbies	Suncorp Stadium, Brisbane
19:40	Try: Jake Schatz 14'; Rod Davies 49'; Liam Gill 75'; Con: Quade Cooper 15', 76' (2/3)	Report	Try: Christian Lealiifano 24'; Con: Christian Lealiifano 25' (1/1); Pen: Christian Lealiifano 5', 10', 53', 59' (4/4); Nic White (0/2); Cards: Christian Lealiifano (yellow card) 29' to 40'; Scott Sio (yellow card) 69' to 79'	Attendance: 38,404; Referee: Glen Jackson

The captains and coaches (Ben Mowen and Jake White for the Brumbies, and James Horwill and Ewen McKenzie for the Reds) all considered Rod Macqueen Cup games of 2010–2013 to be of a test standard.

=== Era of Home Ground Advantage (2015 – Present) ===
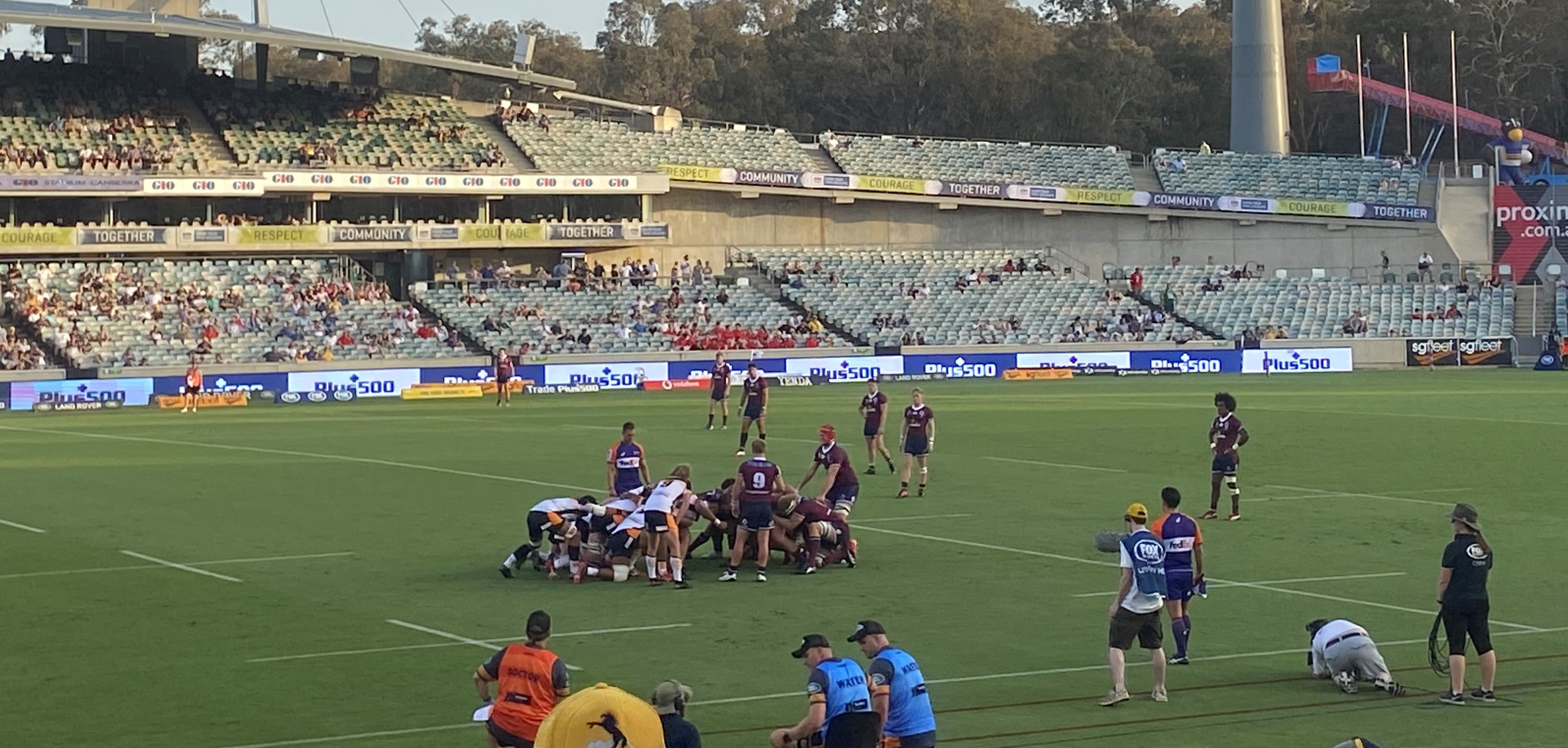
The Brumbies and the Reds pack down to scrum at GIO Stadium, 31 January 2020

The Brumbies retained the Rod Macqueen Cup from 2013 to 2020. However, unlike the early years of Super Rugby, the fixture is now regularly won by the home team, with neither of the teams winning away from home between 2015 and 2020. The Reds broke this streak in 2021, when they beat the Brumbies in Canberra.

In 2020, the Reds began to threaten for the top spot in Australian rugby. Despite losing five of their seven games before the season was cancelled due to the COVID-19 pandemic, the Reds were incredibly competitive against the Brumbies, the Crusaders, and the Sharks, who were all considered favourites to win their own conference and to make the final. Commentators and pundits pointed to the four 2020 Brumbies-Reds games as "[improving] the standard of Australian Rugby", with a sense of excitement due to "both teams [having] a great chance of winning it" each time.

The Reds delivered on their potential in the Australian resumption of Super Rugby, only losing two of their eight games and reaching the final against the Brumbies.

19 September 2020	Brumbies	28 – 23	Reds	GIO Stadium, Canberra
19:15 (UTC+10)	Try: Fainga'a 17'; Muirhead 26'; Banks 45'; Con: Lolesio 18', 47' (2/3); Pen: Lolesio 5', 55' (2/3); Drop: Lolesio 49'	Report	Try: Wilson 31'; Blyth 64'; Con: O'Connor 32', 65'; Pen: O'Connor 13', 40+2', 59' (3/3); Cards: Daugunu (yellow card) 50' to 60'	Attendance: 6,000; Referee: Angus Gardner

In 2021, the Reds won the Rod Macqueen Cup for the second time, beating the Brumbies 40 – 38 in Canberra, and 24 – 22 in Brisbane. The games between the teams in 2021 were generally considered "thrillers" that "exceeded all expectations as a spectacle". Pundits consider that the majority of players for the Wallabies in 2021 will come from the Reds or the Brumbies, noting that this would be a first since 1999.

The Reds won the 2021 Super Rugby AU season, beating the Brumbies 19 – 16 in Brisbane.

8 May 2021	Reds	19 – 16	Brumbies	Suncorp Stadium, Brisbane
19:45 (GMT +10)	Try: O'Connor 80+5' c Con: O'Connor (1/1) 80+7'; Pen: O'Connor (4/5) 3', 30', 51', 64'	Report; Summary	Try: Banks 13' c Con: Lolesio (1/1) 14'; Pen: Lolesio (3/3) 32', 40', 71'	Attendance: 41,637; Referee: Nic Berry

== Notable players for both teams ==
Several players have had successful periods playing for both clubs, including:

Criteria: (At least 20 games with both teams OR (captain of at one team AND at least 20 games with the other)) AND (at least 50 games for one team OR at least 60 games combined for both teams)
Notable players to play for both the Brumbies and the Reds
Player	Brumbies Years	Brumbies Caps	Reds Years	Reds Caps
Mitchell Chapman	2008 – 2011	40	2005 – 2007	28
Troy Coker	1996 – 1998	23	1983 – 1988, 1992 – 1995	30
Saia Fainga'a	2006 – 2008, 2017	30	2009 – 2016	99
Julian Huxley	2002, 2007 – 2010	28	2003 – 2006	31
Stephen Moore	2009 – 2016	117	2003 – 2008, 2017	59
Radike Samo	2000 – 2006	35	2010 – 2013	33
**James Slipper**	2019 – Present	39	2010 – 2018	105
JP Smith	2014 – 2015	25	2018 – 2020	39
George Smith	1999 – 2010, 2013	142	2017 – 2018	22
Ruan Smith	2013 – 2016	51	2018 – 2019	27
Aidan Toua	2015 – 2016	30	2009 – 2014, 2018 – 2019	24
Adam Wallace-Harrison	2003 – 2008	37	2011 – 2013	30
Andrew Walker	2000 – 2003	47	2007 – 2008	21
Josh Valentine	2010 – 2011	25	2003 – 2006	38

As of 25 September 2021.
Players in bold are still playing for one of the two teams.

== Rod Macqueen Cup Results ==
Brumbies Win	Reds Win	Draw

Season	Score	Winner	Venue	Attendance
2005 Game 1	38 – 21	ACT Brumbies	Suncorp Stadium	28,323
2006 Game 1	36 – 0	ACT Brumbies	Canberra Stadium	17,041
2007 Game 1	6 – 3	ACT Brumbies	Suncorp Stadium	25,170
2008 Game 1	43 – 11	ACT Brumbies	Canberra Stadium	15,244
2009 Game 1	52 – 13	ACT Brumbies	Suncorp Stadium	19,346
2010 Game 1	32 – 12	ACT Brumbies	Canberra Stadium	18,023
2011 Game 1	31 – 25	Queensland Reds	Canberra Stadium	16,027
2011 Game 2	22 – 14	ACT Brumbies	Suncorp Stadium	27,374
2012 Game 1	20 – 13	Queensland Reds	Suncorp Stadium	31,479
2012 Game 2	13 – 12	Queensland Reds	Canberra Stadium	16,123
2013 Game 1	24 – 6	ACT Brumbies	Canberra Stadium	17,058
2013 Game 2	19 – 19	Draw	Suncorp Stadium	38,404
2014 Game 1	27 – 17	Queensland Reds	Canberra Stadium	13,670
2014 Game 2	23 – 20	ACT Brumbies	Suncorp Stadium	30,004
2015 Game 1	47 – 3	ACT Brumbies	Canberra Stadium	13,570
2015 Game 2	29 – 0	ACT Brumbies	Suncorp Stadium	22,537
2016 Game 1	43 – 24	ACT Brumbies	Canberra Stadium	9,830
2017 Game 1	43 – 10	ACT Brumbies	Canberra Stadium	11,466
2017 Game 2	16 – 15	Queensland Reds	Suncorp Stadium	13,264
2018 Game 1	18 – 10	Queensland Reds	Suncorp Stadium	11,034
2018 Game 2	45 – 21	ACT Brumbies	Canberra Stadium	7,598
2019 Game 1	36 – 14	Queensland Reds	Suncorp Stadium	13,566
2019 Game 2	40 – 27	ACT Brumbies	Canberra Stadium	9,751
2020 Game 1	27 – 24	ACT Brumbies	Canberra Stadium	7,436
2020 Game 2	22 – 20	ACT Brumbies	Canberra Stadium	1,525
2020 Game 3	26 – 7	Queensland Reds	Suncorp Stadium	9,922
2020 Super Rugby AU Final	28 – 23	ACT Brumbies	Canberra Stadium	6,000
2021 Game 1	40 – 38	Queensland Reds	Canberra Stadium	9,384
2021 Game 2	24 – 22	Queensland Reds	Suncorp Stadium	19,185
2021 Super Rugby AU Final	19 – 16	Queensland Reds	Suncorp Stadium	41,637
2022 Game 1	16 – 12	ACT Brumbies	Canberra Stadium	unknown
2022 Game 2	21 – 7	Queensland Reds	Suncorp Stadium	13,257
2023 Game 1	23 – 17	ACT Brumbies	Canberra Stadium	8,501
2023 Game 2	52 – 24	ACT Brumbies	Suncorp Stadium	9,702
2024 Game 1	20 – 19	ACT Brumbies	Suncorp Stadium	17,782
2025 Game 1	39 – 26	ACT Brumbies	Suncorp Stadium	12,331
2025 Game 2	24 – 14	ACT Brumbies	GIO Stadium	11,438

== See also ==
- Templeton Cup, annual trophy contested between the Queensland Reds and New South Wales Waratahs since 2000
- Dan Vickerman Cup, rivalry trophy held between the Brumbies and Waratahs
- Weary Dunlop Shield, (2011–2024), defunct rivalry shield held between the Rebels and Waratahs
