= Super Rugby Aotearoa =

Rugby Competition

- Official Logo
- Sport: Rugby Union
- Founded: 2020; 6 years ago
- First season: 2020
- Folded: 2021
- Owner: SANZAAR
- CEO: Greg Peters
- Divisions: New Zealand
- No. of teams: 5
- Country: New Zealand
- Last champion: Crusaders (2nd title) (2021)
- Most titles: Crusaders (2 titles)
- Broadcasters: Digicel; ESPN; ESPN International; Nine Network; RugbyPass; Sky Sport; Stan Sport; SuperSport; Telefónica; Wowow
- Sponsor: Sky
- Related competitions: Super Rugby; Super Rugby AU; Super Rugby Unlocked; Mitre 10 Cup
- Website: SuperRugby.com

Super Rugby Aotearoa named the Sky Super Rugby Aotearoa for sponsorship purposes was a professional men's rugby union national club competition in New Zealand. Originally created to supplement the 2020 Super Rugby season, which was suspended due to the COVID-19 pandemic, the tournament continued in 2021, with a competition being confirmed later that year, including 12 teams in a brand new competition named Super Rugby Pacific.

In its first season, the tournament was a 10-week round robin tournament played by the five New Zealand–based teams of Super Rugby. However, for 2021, the tournament had an additional final between the two highest placed teams in the tournament, with a finals system being used by the similarly created Super Rugby AU tournament in Australia.

== Law adaptions ==
On 2 June, New Zealand Rugby announced that it would implement two optional law trials being offered by World Rugby, including a golden point format for extra time, and that players who receive a red card can be substituted after 20 minutes. It was also stated that referees would be stricter in applying laws for breakdowns to increase the pace of play.

== Broadcasters ==
Super Rugby Aotearoa is shown by the following broadcasters:

Broadcaster	Country(ies)
Digicel	Cook Islands; Fiji; Papua New Guinea; Samoa; Solomon Islands; Tonga; Tuvalu; Vanuatu
ESPN; ESPN International	Argentina; Bolivia; Brazil; Canada; Chile; Colombia; Ecuador; Guyana; Paraguay; Peru; Suriname; United States; Uruguay; Venezuela
Nine Network; Stan Sport	Australia
RugbyPass	All other countries
Sky Sport	New Zealand
SuperSport	South Africa
Telefónica	Spain
Wowow	Japan

== Corporate relations ==
=== Sponsorship ===
The 2020 tournament was run by Rugby New Zealand with the sponsorship of Foxtel which provided television coverage on its Fox Sports channels with Sky (New Zealand) being the naming rights sponsor. Gilbert is the official supplier of all rugby balls.

=== Merchandising ===
Official match-day attire together with other club merchandise is sold through the Super Rugby Aotearoa's stores and website as well as through the clubs and some retailers.

== See also ==
- SANZAAR
- Super Rugby
- Super Rugby AU
- Super Rugby Unlocked
