= SANZAAR =

Rugby union organization

- Formation: 1996; 30 years ago
- Type: International Sport Federation
- Headquarters: Sydney, New South Wales, Australia
- Coordinates: 33°53′28″S 151°15′00″E
- CEO: Brendan Morris
- Website: super.rugby/superrugby

SANZAAR (South African, New Zealand, Australian and Argentina Rugby), previously known as SANZAR (South African, New Zealand, Australian Rugby) is the body which oversees Super Rugby and the Rugby Championship competitions in rugby union. SANZAAR meets annually and is composed of the CEOs from its member unions.

It was formed as SANZAR in 1996 as a joint venture of the South African Rugby Union, the New Zealand Rugby Union, and the Australian Rugby Union. From the 2016 season, its name was changed to SANZAAR following the inclusion of the Argentine Rugby Union as a full member of the organisation.

== History ==
=== Tri-Nations and Super 12: 1996 ===
SANZAR logo up to 2015.

SANZAR was formed in 1995, shortly after rugby's move to professionalism, to counter the threat of Australia's Super League, a new rugby league competition that offered large salaries to players.

SANZAR proposed the Super 12, an annual provincial competition with teams from all three countries, and the Tri Nations Series, an annual competition between each country's Test teams. This concept was developed by Queensland Rugby Union CEO Terry Doyle, New South Wales Rugby Union CEO David Moffett and Australian Rugby Union CEO Bruce Hayman. Rian Oberholzer was the first CEO of SANZAR.

SANZAR's proposals were under serious threat from the World Rugby Corporation (WRC), a company formed by lawyer Geoff Levy and former Wallaby player Ross Turnbull. Both wanted a professional worldwide rugby competition funded by Kerry Packer, who had already developed professional cricket. At one point the WRC had a majority of the All Blacks and Wallaby teams signed up to their competition. However, the South African Rugby Union told the Springboks players that they would never play for their country again if they committed to the WRC, and they remained with the SARU. Most of the All Blacks then followed them, and finally the Wallabies did too.

To fund the competitions, SANZAR looked to News Limited, who was the Super League's broadcaster, eventually being offered $555 million over 10 years for worldwide television rights.

=== Expansion to Super 14 ===
In 2002, a proposal to expand the Super 12 to fourteen teams, supported by Australia and South Africa, was vetoed by the New Zealand Rugby Union. This led to calls for the Australian and South African teams to withdraw from the competition, but the partnership continued and the issue was revisited before the end of the original 10-year broadcasting deal.

For the 2006 season, SANZAR agreed to expand the Super 12 competition with two new teams and to increase the number of Test matches played in the Tri-Nations. Licences were granted for franchises based in Bloemfontein and Perth, creating the Cheetahs and Western Force teams for the expanded Super 14 competition.

The SANZAR partnership was tested in 2007 after New Zealand removed its top 22 players from the Super 14 competition, and South Africa's removal of players from the Tri-Nations prompted calls for the Australian Rugby Union to cancel future matches against the Springboks.

==== Potential South African departure ====
In 2009 there emerged concerns that South African Rugby Union might opt to break away from the alliance over a dispute about the proposed plan to expand Super Rugby to fifteen teams in 2011, voicing its support for the concept generally but disagreeing over its length and format. On 6 May 2009, however, ARU Chief Executive John O'Neill warned that the South Africans would be the real losers, missing out altogether and potentially losing players if they went ahead with the split. "The joint venture must remain intact", he urged. "I have dealt with the South Africans for years in business and sport. Part of their DNA is to take it to the brink. There's a moment when they will realise they have taken it far enough." On 20 May 2009, SANZAR announced it had reached agreement on a new deal involving all three nations beginning in the 2011 season.

=== The Rugby Championship and Super Rugby: 2011 ===
The deal for 2011 to 2015 included:

- Super Rugby expanded to 15 teams, and split into three conferences, each with five teams and based in one of the three nations. The four current Australian teams would be joined by a new team in the Australia conference; this license was later awarded to the Melbourne Rebels.
- At the same time, the regular season expanded to include 16 matches (8 home, 8 away) per team, with each country playing a double round-robin within its home conference, and playing single matches against four teams from each of the other conferences.
- Super Rugby taking three weeks off in June for the mid-year Tests.
- The play-offs expanded to six teams, with the conference winners joined by the three non-winners with the most competition points without regard to conference affiliation. The two conference winners with the most competition points received a first-round bye in the play-offs.
- The Rugby Championship opening each year in South Africa, and concluding with two of the three Bledisloe Cup matches between Australia and New Zealand that fall within the Rugby Championship. This allowed Springboks to be released early for their domestic competition, the Currie Cup.

=== Super Rugby to Argentina and Japan: 2016 ===
Further expansion was agreed in 2015 to include the Argentine Rugby Union as a full member of SANZAAR from 2016. Three additional teams were included in the Super Rugby competition, one each from South Africa, Argentina and Japan. Two regional groupings were formed: the Australasian Group, with five teams in the Australian Conference and five teams in the New Zealand Conference and the South African Group, with six South African teams, one Argentinean team and one Japanese team split into a four-team Africa 1 Conference a four-team Africa 2 Conference.

While a Japanese team has been invited to participate in the Super Rugby competition from 2016, Japan was never a member of SANZAAR. 2020 was also the last year Japan's team, the Sunwolves, were in the Super Rugby competition.

In 2017, the Australian Rugby Union was rebranded to Rugby Australia.

=== Member unions ===
- Argentine Rugby Union
- New Zealand Rugby
- Rugby Australia
- South African Rugby Union
