= Super Rugby =

Rugby union club competition

- Current season, competition or edition: 2026 Super Rugby Pacific season
- Formerly: Super 12 (1996–2005); Super 14 (2006–2010)
- Sport: Rugby union
- Founded: 1996; 30 years ago
- First season: 1996
- Owner: SANZAAR
- CEO: Jack Mesley
- No. of teams: 10
- Country: Australia (4 teams); Fiji (1 team); New Zealand (5 teams)
- Most recent champion: Hurricanes (2026, 2nd title)
- Most titles: Crusaders (13 titles)
- Broadcaster: See broadcasters
- Related competitions: Super Rugby Women's; Super Rugby Aupiki
- Website: super.rugby

Super Rugby is a men's professional rugby union club competition involving teams from Australia, Fiji, New Zealand, and the Pacific Islands. It has previously included teams from Argentina, Japan, and South Africa. Super Rugby started as the Super 12 in the 1996 season with 12 teams from Australia, New Zealand, and South Africa, building on competitions dating back to the South Pacific Championship in 1986. The Super 12 was established by SANZAR after the sport became professional in 1995. After the COVID-19 pandemic forced the competition to split into three, the reformed competition in 2021 only included teams from Australia, New Zealand, and the Pacific islands.

The name was changed to Super 14 with the addition of two teams for the 2006 season, and with expansion to 15 teams for the 2011 season, the competition was rebranded as Super Rugby (with no number). In 2016 two new teams, the Jaguares from Argentina and Sunwolves from Japan, joined the competition, playing in two newly separated African groups. In 2018, the Cheetahs, Kings and Western Force were dropped, leaving 15 teams. The Sunwolves left the competition before the end of the 2020 season.

The 2020 season was cancelled due to the COVID-19 pandemic. Due to international travel restrictions relating to the pandemic, Rugby Australia and New Zealand Rugby held domestic tournaments, Super Rugby AU and Super Rugby Aotearoa respectively. Both these tournaments continued in 2021, to be followed by Super Rugby Trans-Tasman, a crossover tournament. In September 2020, the South African Rugby Union withdrew their four franchises from the competition, with plans for them to join the PRO14. The Argentine Jaguares also left the competition.

In August 2021 a 12-team format was confirmed, with the addition of the Fijian Drua and Moana Pasifika, a team representing the Pacific Islands. The tournament from 2022 is named Super Rugby Pacific.

The competition has been dominated by New Zealand teams, who have won 21 times in 28 years. The Crusaders have won most often, with 13 titles.

== Organisation and format ==
=== SANZAAR ===
SANZAAR is the body that administers Super Rugby, and has the Australian, New Zealand, South African and Argentine rugby unions as its members. SANZAAR also runs the Rugby Championship tournament that is contested by Argentina, Australia, New Zealand and South Africa following the conclusion of the Super Rugby tournament; the Tri-Nations preceded the Rugby Championship before Argentina joined the competition. The organisation was formed in 1996 to establish and run the Super 12, and Tri-Nations Tournament.

=== Competition format ===
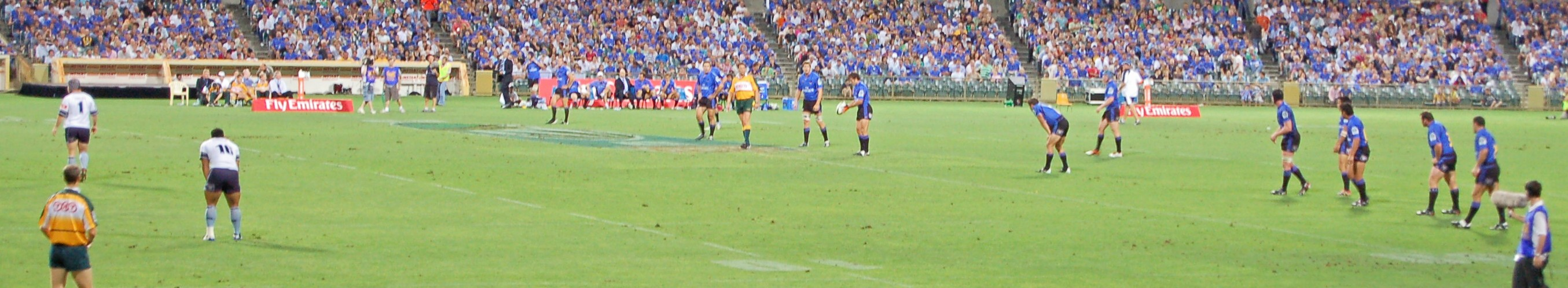
Western Force (Blue) kicking off to the New South Wales Waratahs (White).

Prior to 2011, Super Rugby was a round-robin competition where each team played every other team once; a team had six or seven home games, and six or seven away games each. The winner received four competition points; if the game was a draw two points were awarded to each team. The bonus points system was also used, where any team scoring four or more tries, and/or losing by seven points or less, receives an extra competition point. In 2016, the try bonus changed. A team now has to score three more tries than their opponents. The top four teams at the end of the round-robin phase then played semi-finals – the first placed team hosting the fourth placed team, and the second placed team hosting the third placed team. The two winners then played the final at the home ground of the top surviving seed. There were 91 regular season games in total. Games were held over 14 weekends with each team receiving one bye.

From 2011 – 2015 the format changed, with each country forming its own conference. Each team within a conference played each of the other teams in its conference twice, once at home and once away. Each team then played four out of the five teams from each of the other conferences once. Competition points were awarded on a similar basis as before. The format of the finals also changed; it involved six teams: the top team in each of the three conferences plus the three next teams with the highest total number of points, regardless of conference. The four lower ranking teams were paired in two sudden death games; the winners of those two games each played one of the two top ranked teams (which received a bye at the start of the finals). Those winners played for the championship.

For the 2016 and 2017 seasons the format changed again, with three more teams joining, one each from Argentina, Japan and South Africa. There were four conferences, with Africa getting two conferences. The finals had eight teams with each conference winner getting a home quarter final. They were joined by four wild card teams, three from the Australasian group and one from the South African group.

From the 2018 season the format changed again, with two South African teams and an Australian team being dropped. There were three conferences, one containing the five New Zealand teams, a South African one including Argentina's team and an Australian one including Japan's team.

Due to the COVID-19 pandemic the competition had to undergo a change in structure and be split into regionalised tournaments. There were two national competitions, Australia's Super Rugby AU and New Zealand's Super Rugby Aotearoa, and those were followed by Super Rugby Trans-Tasman in 2021, a crossover competition involving the five Australian sides playing the five New Zealand sides. Super Rugby currently only consists of Australian and New Zealand sides, with the Japanese Sunwolves departing the competition after the 2020 season, the South African sides voting to leave to join an expanded PRO14 (Later known as the United Rugby Championship), and the Argentine Jaguares not set to compete in any Super Rugby tournament in 2021.

From 2022, the tournament reverted to round robin format featuring 12 teams, with the Fijian Drua and Moana Pasifika joining the competition. There are no divisions from 2022 onwards, with one main log being used instead, and top 8 teams qualifying for the playoffs.

Since 2022, each Super Rugby season has featured a "Super Round", where an entire round of Super Rugby matches is played over a weekend at a single stadium; both the 2022 and 2023 Super Rounds were played at AAMI Park in Melbourne, with the 2024 Super Round set to be played there as well.

== History ==
=== Background ===
Before 1996, a number of transnational competitions involving regional and provincial rugby union teams had taken shape in the southern hemisphere. The earliest of these was the South Pacific Championship, which was launched in 1986 and continued until 1990.

Super 6 Champions
Season	Champions
1992	Queensland

==== Super 6 ====
After the demise of the South Pacific Championship, with no tournament played in 1991, the competition was relaunched as the Super 6 in 1992. The competition included three provincial teams from New Zealand: Auckland, Canterbury, Wellington; along with two Australian state teams: Queensland and New South Wales; and also the Fiji national team.

==== Super 10 ====
Super 10 Champions 1993 – 1995
Season	Champions
1993	Transvaal
1994	Queensland
1995	Queensland

In 1993, the Super Six competition was revamped and expanded into the Super 10 tournament. With South Africa being readmitted into international sport following the dismantling of apartheid, there was an opportunity to launch an expanded competition which would also feature South Africa's top provincial teams. The inaugural competition featured the following teams: Waikato, Auckland, Otago and North Harbour (New Zealand); Natal, Northern Transvaal and Transvaal (South Africa); Queensland and New South Wales (Australia) and Western Samoa (Pacific Tri-Nations winner). The Super 10 was won by Transvaal (South Africa) in 1993, and by Queensland (Australia) in 1994 and 1995.

=== SANZAR era ===
==== Super 12 (1995–2005) ====
The official declaration of professionalism in rugby union in August 1995 led to a restructuring of the Super 10 competition. Following the success of the 1995 World Cup, the rugby boards of Australia, New Zealand and South Africa formed SANZAR (South African, New Zealand and Australian Rugby) to administer an annual 12-team provincial/franchise based competition pitting regional teams from the three nations against each other. In addition it was decided to hold an annual Tri-Nations Test Series between the three countries. A significant reason for the development of the Super 12 was the threat to rugby union from rival football code rugby league: part of the business model for the Foxtel pay TV network in Australia was to attract subscribers by offering an exclusive product (such as rugby union) which could not be seen on free-to-air broadcast television. By setting up the Super 12, the Unions had a product that was in demand from viewers, enabling them to sell a 10-year contract for exclusive television rights to News Corp for US$555 million, giving them both coverage and financial support to kickstart the new competition.

Format history
Period	Name	Teams	Countries
1996–2005	Super 12	12	Australia, New Zealand, South Africa
2006–2010	Super 14	14	Australia, New Zealand, South Africa
2011–2015	Super Rugby	15	Australia, New Zealand, South Africa
2016–2017	Super Rugby	18	Argentina, Australia, Japan, New Zealand, South Africa
2018–2020	Super Rugby	15	Argentina, Australia, Japan, New Zealand, South Africa
2020	Super Rugby (AU, NZ, SA)	17	Australia, New Zealand, South Africa
2021	Super Rugby (AU, NZ, TT)	10	Australia, New Zealand
2022–2024	Super Rugby Pacific	12	Australia, Fiji, New Zealand, Pacific Islands
2025–2026	Super Rugby Pacific	11	Australia, Fiji, New Zealand, Pacific Islands
2027–	Super Rugby Pacific	10	Australia, Fiji, New Zealand

With significant sponsorship, and rugby turning a professional sport in August 1995, the Super 12 competition successfully kicked off in 1996 with five New Zealand franchises, four South African provinces and three domestic Australian teams competing. New Zealand's dominance of the competition began in the first year when the Auckland Blues won the inaugural competition defeating South African side the Sharks 45–21 in a home final. The Blues would repeat the success of 1996 beating Australian side the ACT Brumbies 23–7 in the 1997 final.

The Blues then reached their third successive final in 1998 but went down to fellow countrymen the Canterbury Crusaders 13–20. This would mark the beginning of the Crusaders' three-year dominance as they went on to win the 1999 and 2000 finals over the Otago Highlanders and ACT Brumbies respectively. The 2001 season was the first in which no New Zealand franchise reached the final, being contested between the ACT Brumbies and Sharks with the Brumbies convincing winners, with a 36–6 score line.

The Crusaders won their 4th final in 2002 winning all 11 matches and missed out on their 5th in 2003 with a four-point loss to fellow countrymen the Blues. In 2004 the Brumbies took revenge on their 2000 final loss to the Crusaders defeating them 47–38 in front of a home crowd. The Crusaders would bounce back to win the 2005 final 35–25 against the Australian side the New South Wales Waratahs who reached their first-ever final. This was the last year of the 12 team format.

In the late 1990s and early 2000s, the Australian Rugby Union (ARU) had been pushing for a fourth Australian team to enter the competition, based in either Melbourne or Perth. News reports also alluded to a potential format re-structuring alongside expansion, to a 20-team competition. In early 2000, the ARU moved to quash a prospective joint bid for a new Australian Super 12 franchise, which had proposed to stage matches across both Melbourne and Perth by the unions in their respective states. The ARU stated that it preferred a potential new Australian team to be based in one capital city. Expansion into Australia at this time was viewed favourably by the South African Rugby Union (SARU), whereas New Zealand Rugby (NZR) was firmly against. Western Sydney later became a location for potential expansion, with three major rugby league clubs in the National Rugby League (Parramatta Eels, Canterbury-Bankstown Bulldogs, Penrith Panthers) aiming to be financial partners in a fourth Australian franchise. Any expansion plans were not expected to take place until at least 2003, with a fifth South African team also possible. On 11 December 2004, the Perth-based Western Force were admitted into the competition as a new franchise after receiving the endorsement of the ARU over a Melbourne-based franchise bid. In April the following year, the Bloemfontein-based Cheetahs were announced as the fifth South African franchise to join the competition. The Cheetahs, composed of the Free State, Griqualand West and Griffons Rugby Unions, were awarded the franchise ahead of the Southern and Eastern Cape delegation, which had the support of the South African Sports Minister Makhenkesi Stofile. Both new franchises were admitted into the competition in the 2006 season.

==== Super 14 (2006–2010) ====
SANZAR announced in December 2004 that a new five-year television deal had been signed that would cover 2006 to 2010, with News Corporation winning the rights for the UK, Australia and New Zealand, and SuperSport winning rights for South Africa. The contract was worth US$323 million over five years, a 16% annual increase compared to the previous deal. It covers international fixtures as well as the Super 14. SANZAR remained free to negotiate separate deals for other markets, such as France, Japan and the Americas.

Under the new deal, Australia and South Africa each got one extra team in the competition, and a third round of fixtures was added to the Tri Nations Series. The new Australian team in the competition was based in Perth and was named the Western Force.

The addition of the new South African team led to considerable controversy, including government involvement. Finally, the five teams for 2006 were confirmed to be the country's existing four teams plus the Cheetahs, which draws its players from the Free State and Northern Cape Provinces. For the 2007 season, the Southern Spears, based in Port Elizabeth, were originally intended to replace the lowest-finishing South African team from the 2006 competition. However, the existing South African Super 14 franchises opposed the plan, which was pushed through by controversial president of the South African Rugby Union, Brian van Rooyen. After van Rooyen was ousted as president, SARU announced that the Spears would not enter the competition. SARU investigated the viability of the Spears after discovering serious financial irregularities. A High Court of South Africa ruling stated that the Spears had a valid contract to compete in the Super 14 and Currie Cup. However, because of the organisation's financial and administrative troubles, in November 2006 a settlement was reached. The Spears abandoned their legal case, and will continue to exist, but not compete in the Super 14.

SANZAR rejected a proposal to split the Super 14 into two seven-team divisions, and decided to keep the competition in its traditional single-table format. Argentina and the Pacific Islands remained shut out of the competition.

The two new teams did not perform all that well, the South African franchise the Cheetahs did the better of the two teams finishing 10th on the ladder notching up 5 season wins. The Australian franchise the Western Force only managed one victory and ended winning the wooden spoon as last placed 14th. The highlight for the Force was a 23-all draw against eventual champions the Crusaders, who defeated first-time finalists the Hurricanes 19–12.

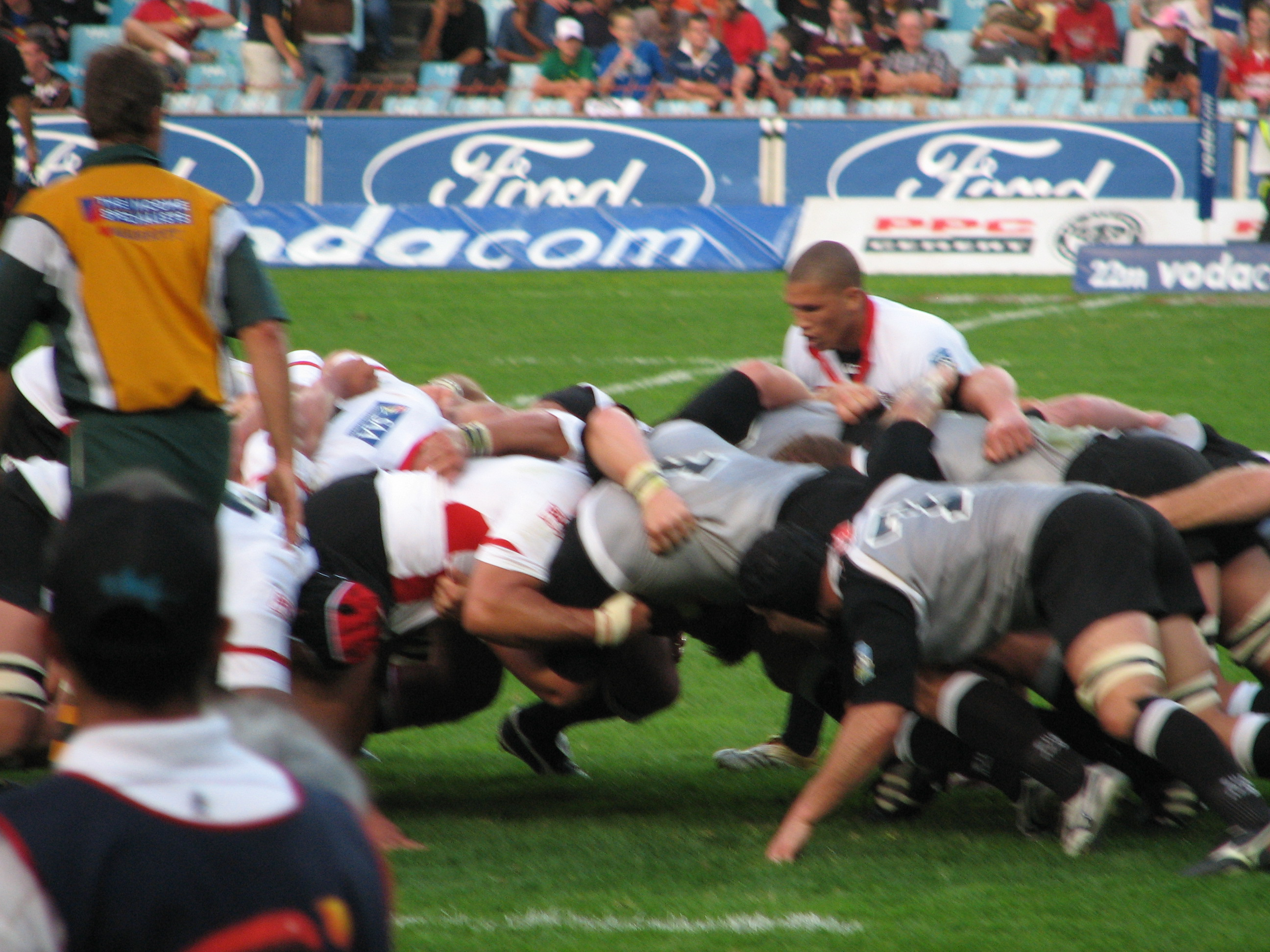
The Cats (now the Lions) playing the Sharks.

During the 2007 season, 22 All Blacks missed the competition's first seven rounds as part of an All Black "conditioning programme" that was a part of the All Blacks' 2007 Rugby World Cup preparations, and every New Zealand franchise was without players for the first seven rounds. At the end of the regular season, for the first time since 1998, no Australian franchise had made the semi-finals. Although the Brumbies were strong and the Western Force experienced vast improvement, it was a poor season for the Queensland Reds and Waratahs who finished last and second last respectively. Also, the competition featured the first all-South African final as the Sharks and Bulls, who finished 1–2 on the season ladder, both won their respective semi-finals. The final, held in Durban, saw the visiting Bulls win 20–19.

During the time the competition was branded as the Super 14, only two teams won the tournament. The Crusaders winning the 2006 and 2008 tournaments; while the Bulls ended victorious in 2007, 2009, and 2010 respectively.

==== Super Rugby: 15 teams (2011–2015) ====
SANZAR unveiled in 2009 its model for an expanded season that would begin in 2011. This model was based around the original ARU proposal for three national conferences: each side were to have played the other four teams from their own country twice and the other ten teams once each; the season has to end with a six-team finals series.

There were four major compromises, however, designed to accommodate certain wishes of each country, that somewhat complicated the model:

- Each team would only play four, instead of all five, teams in each of the other two national conferences, making sixteen regular season games for each team instead of eighteen, and allowing for a late February start, somewhat placating the ARU and NZRU who wanted a March start.
- There would be a three-week gap for the June test (international) matches favoured by the SARU.
- The season would finish in early August so as not to overlap new streamlined versions of New Zealand's and South Africa's domestic competitions.
- The three conference winners and the three best performers of the remaining teams would qualify for a three-week finals series, with seedings deciding the match-ups. This system is a hybrid of the conference-based qualification system favoured by the SARU and the 'top six' model favoured by the ARU and NZRU.

SANZAR announced in 2009 the addition of a fifth Australian team that would play in the expanded "Super Rugby" competition in 2011. The licence was awarded to Victoria, Australia, and the team's name announced as the Melbourne Rebels. The Australian start-up franchise was given the nod ahead of South Africa's Southern Kings. Brian Waldron, former CEO of the NRL club the Melbourne Storm, was confirmed as the new CEO of the Rebels on 11 January 2010, but resigned on 23 April after a salary cap breach was uncovered at the Storm.

=== SANZAAR era ===
==== Expansion: 18 teams (2016–2017) ====
In February 2012, SANZAR chief executive Greg Peters announced that the organisation was considering adding franchises in Argentina, Japan and the United States in 2016, the first year of SANZAR's next television contract. This was also the year that rugby sevens entered the Olympics, which contributed towards increased interest in the sport in many countries, including Japan and the US.

Australian sports broadcasting analyst Colin Smith noted that the addition of Japanese and American teams could result in a TV deal worth more than A$1 billion beyond 2020. Specifically, he stated, "You could have a deal comparable to the other major sports in Australia. Rugby is a college (university) sport in the US, if soccer can create its own league there and sell teams for $40 million, imagine what you could do in 10–12 years with rugby in that market." By comparison, the largest TV deal in Australian sport, that of the Australian Football League (Australian rules), is worth A$1.26 billion from 2012 to 2016. Even that figure was dwarfed by the TV contracts of the NFL, for which contracts at the time were worth more than US$4 billion annually.

Peters added that the conference-based structure was ideal for expanding the competition to new territories, either by adding new conferences or by adding teams to the current conferences. He also discussed the possibility that offshore Super Rugby teams could be a home for surplus players from the SANZAR countries, keeping them in the SANZAR fold and away from European clubs.

Prior to Super Rugby's broadcast contracts expiring after the 2015 season, SANZAR considered several alternatives for the competition's future organisation:

- Retention of the conference system that was in place for 2011–15.
- Expansion of the structure to include teams from Asia, the United States and/or Canada.
- A split of the competition, with South Africa forming one competition with the likely addition of at least one Argentine side, and Australia and New Zealand forming another, with the possibility of including Asian teams.

The last proposal, made by the SARU, was reportedly driven by internal union politics. With only five guaranteed places in Super Rugby but six active franchises, the bottom team in the South African Conference faced a promotion/relegation playoff with the sixth franchise for a place in the next season's competition. Australia and New Zealand warmed to the SARU proposal, as a trans-Tasman competition would potentially allow for more regional derbies, fewer time zone complications and less player travel. However, NZRU chief executive Steve Tew indicated that a competition that did not include South African teams was a commercial non-starter because of large broadcast revenues from that country and because the NZRU considered Super Rugby matches in South Africa to be critical for national team development.

SANZAR announced on 4 September 2013 that South Africa would be granted a sixth franchise starting in the 2016 season, negating the need for relegation play-offs involving the sixth South African franchise. SANZAR then announced on 20 November 2014 that Japan and Argentina would each be allocated a team from the 2016 season onwards.

In 2017, the Australian Rugby Union was rebranded to Rugby Australia.

==== Contraction: 15 teams (2018–2020) ====
In April 2017, SANZAAR confirmed the competition would be reduced to 15 teams in 2018 with two South African and one Australian team to have their franchises withdrawn. Subsequently, four South African teams took part: the Bulls, Lions, Sharks and Stormers, with the Cheetahs and Kings losing their spots. The Cheetahs and Kings joined the Pro 12, which became the Pro14 from the 2017–2018 season onwards. On 11 August 2017, Australia announced that the Western Force had lost their licence. On 21 March 2019, SANZAAR confirmed that 2020 will be the Sunwolves' last season of competition in Super Rugby.

==== COVID-19: Regionalisation (2020–2021) ====
Super Rugby Aotearoa

Super Rugby AU

Super Rugby Unlocked

The COVID-19 pandemic caused the 2020 Super Rugby season competition to be cut short. As health concerns eased, other professional sports returned to play. The Super Rugby season was unable to be resumed, however, due to border restrictions and the need for teams to be placed into quarantine upon arrival in each country. This resulted in New Zealand Rugby and Rugby Australia forming their own domestic Super Rugby competitions starting in June and July 2020 respectively. Although both Australia and New Zealand's five franchise teams all played in their respective competitions, Rugby Australia had reportedly worked with the Japan-based Sunwolves on their potential involvement in the Super Rugby AU competition before eventually scratching the proposal as the COVID-19 regulations made it too difficult. South African Rugby subsequently launched its own domestic competition known as Super Rugby Unlocked, which started play in October 2020.

The three competitions formed were:

- Super Rugby Aotearoa (5 teams, New Zealand)
- Super Rugby AU (5 teams, Australia)
- Super Rugby Unlocked (7 teams, South Africa)

Super Rugby Aotearoa featured all five New Zealand teams from Super Rugby: the Blues, Chiefs, Crusaders, Highlanders and Hurricanes. Super Rugby AU included Australia's four teams, the Reds, Waratahs, Brumbies and Rebels, as well as their former Super Rugby franchise, the Western Force. The Force had continued as a franchise after their 2017 post-season exclusion from Super Rugby and were playing in the Global Rapid Rugby, which had also been suspended due to the COVID-19 pandemic. The Australian and New Zealand competitions each scheduled a 20-game home-and-away season in 2020 but Super Rugby AU played two additional knockout matches to decide the Australian title.

Super Rugby Unlocked featured South Africa's four Super Rugby teams (the Bulls, Lions, Sharks and Stormers) plus former franchise the Cheetahs as well as two invited Currie Cup teams: Griquas and Pumas. These seven teams competed in a single round-robin domestic format in 2020.

In September 2020, SA Rugby announced the withdrawal of all their teams from the Super Rugby, with plans for the four franchises to join an expanded Pro14/United Rugby Championship competition in Europe. Super Rugby Aotearoa and Super Rugby AU continued in 2021, with both franchises competing in a crossover competition in the Super Rugby Trans-Tasman in May to June of that year.

==== Super Rugby Pacific (2022–present) ====
In the aftermath of the pandemic, a 12-team competition was proposed, featuring five Australian, five New Zealand sides and two Pacific-based teams. In April 2021, it was announced that two licences had been offered to the Fijian Drua and Moana Pasifika ahead of the 2022 season. The new format was confirmed in August 2021, with the new competition branded as the Super Rugby Pacific. With the newly established league featuring 12 teams across the South Pacific region, the former conference system that had been in place since 2011 was dissolved and replaced with a round-robin tournament.

In 2024, the Melbourne Rebels, following a period of financial difficulties and being placed into administration, were shut down by Rugby Australia. The Rebels board challenged the decision to cut the team and took Rugby Australia to court (which is still ongoing as of 22 November 2026). The Rebels did not take part in the 2025 Super Rugby Pacific season, reducing Australia to four teams once again.

In 2025, talks of expansion were mentioned in both the Australian and New Zealand press after World Rugby Chairman Brett Robinson met officials in the United States about the possibility of including an American team in the competition. Australian sports news website, The Roar, wrote: "At the heart of World Rugby's interest in the expansion is to ensure the United States has a competitive national side by the time the 2031 Rugby World Cup moves to the Americas for the first time. It comes after the USA Eagles missed qualification for the first time in 2023 – five years after Major League Rugby started in 2018." Nothing eventuated from this however.

In April 2026, after the conclusion of the ninth round of the 2026 season, Moana Pasifika announced they would disband at the end of the season due to ongoing financial and operational challenges. The team, which was reportedly in millions of dollars in debt, had an estimated annual operating cost of NZ$7 million. Moana Pasifika would become the second Super Rugby team in three years to be folded after Australia's Melbourne Rebels franchise was axed in 2024. The team's dissolution meant the Super Rugby Pacific would be reduced to ten teams from 2027, the lowest since the Super 10 era in the early 1990s. The Sydney Morning Herald and The Australian posited that this development could pave the way for the introduction of a comprehensive eighteen-round, home-and-away format, alongside a relaxation of Trans-Tasman player eligibility restrictions between Australian and New Zealand franchises. The former proposal was reportedly well received among some franchise bosses, with the latter proposal being more interested by broadcasters. On 24 June 2026, following the conclusion of the 2026 season, New Zealand Rugby (NZR), the licence holder of Moana Pasifika's Super Rugby team, confirmed the club's withdrawal from the competition. It was indicated, however, that a return to Super Rugby in 2028 remained a possibility. The following season subsequently had an increase in regular season matches.

== Franchises ==
=== Current franchises ===
There are eleven franchises currently in Super Rugby; four from Australia, one from Fiji, five from New Zealand, and one representing the Pacific Islands. Each franchise is representing a franchise area, with each franchise in New Zealand representing a collection of unions, compared to the Australian model of one franchise per union. This model differs from the traditional club-based model of other Australian sports; with 4 Super Rugby teams in Australia compared to the 16 Australian-based National Rugby League teams and the 18 teams of the Australian Football League. The Pacific Islands franchise, Moana Pasifika, played mainly in New Zealand during the 2022 season.

Super Rugby (Oceania)
Home locations of all the Super Rugby teams

Overview of current Super Rugby franchises
Country	Team	Stadia information		
Country	Team	Stadia	Capacity	Location
Australia	ACT Brumbies	GIO Stadium	25,011	Bruce, Australian Capital Territory
Australia	Queensland Reds	Suncorp Stadium	52,500	Milton, Queensland
Australia	New South Wales Waratahs	Allianz Stadium	42,500	Moore Park, New South Wales
Australia	Western Force	HBF Park	20,500	Perth, Western Australia
Fiji	Fijian Drua	HFC Bank Stadium	10,000	Suva, Central Division
Fiji	Fijian Drua	Churchill Park	10,000	Lautoka, Western Division
New Zealand	Blues	Eden Park	50,000	Kingsland, Auckland
New Zealand	Chiefs	FMG Stadium Waikato	25,800	Hamilton, Waikato
New Zealand	Crusaders	One NZ Stadium	30,748	Christchurch, Canterbury
New Zealand	Crusaders	Apollo Projects Stadium	17,104	Addington, Canterbury
New Zealand	Highlanders	Forsyth Barr Stadium	30,748	Dunedin, Otago
New Zealand	Hurricanes	Hnry Stadium	34,500	Pipitea, Wellington

=== Former franchises ===
There are twelve former Super Rugby franchises. Nine of which took part during the pre-COVID era (Super 12, Super 14, Super Rugby), and an additional two from South Africa joined as members of the 2020 Super Rugby Unlocked season (Griquas, Pumas), with former Bloemfontein-based Super Rugby franchise, the Cheetahs, re-joining the new competition.

Overview of former Super Rugby franchises
Country	Team	Stadia information			Tenure
Country	Team	Stadia	Capacity	Location	Tenure
Argentina	Jaguares	José Amalfitani Stadium	49,540	Buenos Aires, Buenos Aires Province	2016–2020
Australia	Melbourne Rebels	AAMI Park	29,500	Melbourne, Victoria	2011–2024
Japan	Sunwolves	Prince Chichibu Memorial Stadium	27,188	Minato, Tokyo Prefecture	2016–2020
Japan	Sunwolves	Mong Kok Stadium	6,664	Mong Kok, Hong Kong (Note: Based in Japan and under the control of the Japan Rugby Football Union (JRFU), the Sunwolves played various fixtures in Hong Kong and Singapore throughout their tenure in the Super Rugby.)	2016–2020
Japan	Sunwolves	National Stadium	55,000	Kallang, Singapore	2016–2020
Pacific Islands	Moana Pasifika	North Harbour Stadium	14,000	Albany, Auckland, New Zealand	2022–2026
South Africa	Bulls (Note: The Bulls competed as Northern Transvaal between 1996 and 1997.)	Loftus Versfeld	51,762	Pretoria, Gauteng	1996–2020
South Africa	Cheetahs	Toyota Stadium	42,000	Bloemfontein, Free State	1997; 2006–2017; 2020
South Africa	Griquas	Tafel Lager Park	11,000	Kimberley, Northern Cape	2020
South Africa	Lions (Note: The Lions ompeted as Transvaal in 1996, as the Gauteng Lions in 1997 and as the Cats between 1998 and 2006.)	Emirates Airline Park	62,567	Johannesburg, Gauteng	1996–2012; 2014–2020
South Africa	Pumas	Mbombela Stadium	43,500	Mbombela, Mpumalanga	2020
South Africa	Sharks	Jonsson Kings Park	56,000	Durban, KwaZulu-Natal	1996–2020
South Africa	Southern Kings	Nelson Mandela Bay Stadium	46,000	Gqeberha, Eastern Cape	2013; 2016–2017
South Africa	Stormers	DHL Newlands	51,900	Cape Town, Western Cape	1996–2020

=== Rivalries and trophies ===
==== Australian rivalries ====
"Rod Macqueen Cup" – ACT Brumbies v Queensland Reds
Despite only being established in 1996, at the beginning of the Super Rugby, the rivalry between the ACT Brumbies and Queensland Reds has become the most prominent Australian derby. From 1996 to 2010, the Brumbies held a record of 15–1 against the Reds. By 2024, the record was 16–12, and included matches in the 2020 Super Rugby AU Grand Final and the 2021 Super Rugby AU Grand Final. As of 2024 the Reds are the Brumbies' most played opponent. No official name exists between the teams' fixture.

"Dan Vickerman Cup" – ACT Brumbies v New South Wales Waratahs
The rivalry between the Brumbies and the Waratahs began in 1996 following the establishment of the former in the capital city of Canberra. It has also been called the fiercest rivalry in Australian rugby. In 2017 the contest was named in honour of Dan Vickerman (1979–2017), a former Australia international whom represented both teams during his career.

"Templeton Cup" – New South Wales Waratahs v Queensland Reds
Although there is no official name for the rivalry between the two teams, it has labelled the "Battle of the Border" and the "State of the Union" at various points in the professional era. The rivalry is the oldest and most contested in the Southern Hemisphere, dating back to 1882 when both teams represented neighbouring self-governing colonies of the British Empire. A similar rivalry exists between New South Wales and the Queensland in the sport of rugby league, and is known as the State of Origin series. Since 2000, the two teams compete annually for the Templeton Cup.

==== New Zealand rivalries ====
"Battle of the Bombays" – Blues v Chiefs
Originating in New Zealand's provincial rugby, the "Battle of the Bombays" refers to the rivalry between Auckland and Waikato. The origins for the rivalry and naming originate from historic Māori battles between the Tainui and Ngāti Whātua iwi. The naming has subsequently been used to refer to the Super Rugby rivalry between the Blues and Chiefs, whom makeup the franchise areas of Auckland and Waikato. "Bombays" denotes the Bombay Hills, the border between the Auckland and the Waikato regions.

"Gordon Hunter Memorial Trophy" – Blues v Highlanders
Despite not being a traditional rivalry, the Blues and Highlanders compete annually for a challenge cup known as the Gordon Hunter Memorial Trophy, named for a former head coach of both teams. Geographically, the Blues are the northernmost team in New Zealand, while the Highlanders are the southernmost. The trophy is typically played once per year or once every two years, as it is only contested when the holder plays at home.

"Southern Rivalry" / "Battle of the South" – Crusaders v Highlanders
As the only Super Rugby teams located on the South Island of New Zealand, the rivalry between the Christchurch-based Crusaders and the Dunedin-based Highlanders is often referred to as the "Southern Rivalry" (Note: And Southern Derby.) or the "Battle of the South [Island]". Both teams' franchise areas neighbour one another, with the Crusaders being located within the northern half of the South Island (Canterbury, West Coast, Tasman, Nelson, Marlborough) and the Highlanders making up the southern half (Otago, Southland). The rivalry has been heavily one-sided in favour of the former, whom, since 2000, have been the competition leader in titles. As of 2025 the Crusaders hold a win percentage above 70% against the Highlanders.

"Traditional Rivalry" – Blues v Crusaders
Labelled as the "biggest rivalry in Super Rugby", the contest between the Blues of Auckland and the Crusaders of Canterbury became the most prominent rivalry in New Zealand in the early years of the Super Rugby. Having carried over from the provincial sides' rivalry (Auckland, Canterbury) between the 1980s and 90s, the two teams met each other twice in the new competitions Grand Final within the first decade, the most of any two teams from the same union. Beginning in the 2010s, the Crusaders became a powerhouse team in the Super Rugby, while the Blues were frequently the worst-performing New Zealand team. Between 2004 to 2014, the Crusaders won three titles and made six Grand Final appearances, while the Blues made just two finals appearances, and did not make a single Grand Final. In 2015, The New Zealand Herald asked: "does this rivalry still stack up?" While the two teams are first and second in winning the Super Rugby Championship (Crusaders with 13, Blues with 4), in all time head-to-head play, the Crusaders hold a 70% win ratio against the Blues as of 2025.

==== Defunct rivalries ====
"Ganbatte Trophy" – Melbourne Rebels v Sunwolves
Although not formally declared, or cited, as a rivalry, the Rebels shared a competitive relationship with the Japanese Sunwolves during their period in the Super Rugby. Beginning in 2016, the Rebels and Sunwolves contested for the Ganbatte Trophy. The Rebels were notably the first Australasian Super Rugby team to match up against the Sunwolves. With the Rebels winning all but one of the six contested fixtures, the trophy was stated as being an initiative that would strengthen both teams' relationship and provide a "strong reference point of what all players from both sides should strive for in the future."

"Weary Dunlop Shield" – Melbourne Rebels v New South Wales Waratahs
The former rivalry between the Melbourne-based Rebels and the Waratahs was established in 2011 after the former joined the competition. The one-sided fixture, which ceased at the end of the 2024 season, centered around the Weary Dunlop Shield. The Weary Dunlop Shield was named after Sir Edward "Weary" Dunlop (1907–1993), a distinguished Australian surgeon, World War II veteran, and the first Victorian-born player to represent Australia in rugby union.

== Champions ==
Super Rugby grand finals
Season	Teams	Champion	Score	Runner-up
1996	12	Auckland Blues	45–21	Natal Sharks
1997	12	Auckland Blues	23–7	ACT Brumbies
1998	12	Canterbury Crusaders	20–13	Auckland Blues
1999	12	Canterbury Crusaders	24–19	Otago Highlanders
2000	12	Crusaders	20–19	Brumbies
2001	12	Brumbies	36–6	Sharks
2002	12	Crusaders	31–13	Brumbies
2003	12	Blues	21–17	Crusaders
2004	12	Brumbies	47–38	Crusaders
2005	12	Crusaders	35–25	Waratahs
2006	14	Crusaders	19–12	Hurricanes
2007	14	Bulls	20–19	Sharks
2008	14	Crusaders	20–12	Waratahs
2009	14	Bulls	61–17	Chiefs
2010	14	Bulls	25–17	Stormers
2011	15	Reds	18–13	Crusaders
2012	15	Chiefs	37–6	Sharks
2013	15	Chiefs	27–22	Brumbies
2014	15	Waratahs	33–32	Crusaders
2015	15	Highlanders	21–14	Hurricanes
2016	18	Hurricanes	20–3	Lions
2017	18	Crusaders	25–17	Lions
2018	15	Crusaders	37–18	Lions
2019	15	Crusaders	19–3	Jaguares
2020	15 (17)	Seasons cancelled (§ regional competitions)		
2021	10	Seasons cancelled (§ regional competitions)		
2022	12	Crusaders	21–7	Blues
2023	12	Crusaders	25–20	Chiefs
2024	12	Blues	41–10	Chiefs
2025	11	Crusaders	16–12	Chiefs
2026	11	Hurricanes	60–5	Chiefs

=== Performances by team ===
Performances in the Super Rugby by team
Team	Title(s)	Runners-up	Seasons won	Seasons runner-up
Crusaders	13	4	1998, 1999, 2000, 2002, 2005, 2006, 2008, 2017, 2018, 2019, 2022, 2023, 2025	2003, 2004, 2011, 2014
Blues	4	2	1996, 1997, 2003, 2024	1998, 2022
Bulls	3	0	2007, 2009, 2010	—
Chiefs	2	5	2012, 2013	2009, 2023, 2024, 2025, 2026
Brumbies	2	4	2001, 2004	1997, 2000, 2002, 2013
Hurricanes	2	2	2016, 2026	2006, 2015
Waratahs	1	2	2014	2005, 2008
Highlanders	1	1	2015	1999
Reds	1	0	2011	—
Sharks	0	4	—	1996, 2001, 2007, 2012
Lions	0	3	—	2016, 2017, 2018
Stormers	0	1	—	2010
Jaguares	0	1	—	2019

=== Performances by union ===
Performances in finals by national union
Nation	Titles	Runners-up	Total
New Zealand	22	14	36
Australia	4	6	10
South Africa	3	8	11
Argentina	0	1	1

=== Conference winners ===
Between 2011 and 2019, teams from Australia, New Zealand and South Africa have played in 3 separate conferences. With teams playing each team in their own conference twice (home and away) and in the other conferences playing four of the five teams. The winner of each conference is awarded a home final and their region specific conference trophy. In 2016, the South Africa conference was split in two, with Japan's Sunwolves and Argentina's Jaguares added to South Africa 1 and 2, respectively. In 2018, the South African conferences re-integrated, with Argentina's Jaguares remaining in the South Africa conference, and Japan's Sunwolves joining the Australia conference.

Year Conference		2011	2012	2013	2014	2015	2016	2017	2018	2019
Australia		Reds		Brumbies	Waratahs		Brumbies		Waratahs	Brumbies
New Zealand		Crusaders	Chiefs		Crusaders	Hurricanes		Crusaders		
South Africa	Africa 1	Stormers		Bulls	Sharks	Stormers	Stormers		Lions	Jaguares
South Africa	Africa 2	Stormers		Bulls	Sharks	Stormers	Lions		Lions	Jaguares

=== Regional competition winners ===
Due to the COVID-19 pandemic, regionalised tournaments were played for the remainder of the 2020 Super Rugby season and the 2021 Super Rugby season. Those competitions were: Super Rugby AU (Australia), Super Rugby Aotearoa (New Zealand), Super Rugby Unlocked (South Africa) and Super Rugby Trans-Tasman (Australia and New Zealand).

Competition Year	AU	Aotearoa	Unlocked	Trans-Tasman
2020	Brumbies	Crusaders	Bulls	—N/a
2021	Reds	Crusaders	—N/a	Blues

== Salary cap ==
=== Australia ===
The five Australian teams playing in the competition are subjected to a A$5.5 million salary cap for a squad of up to 40 players per Australian team. The Australian Rugby Union decided in 2011 to introduce the salary cap because of financial pressures. Originally starting in 2012 as a cap of A$4.1 million, it was later raised to A$4.5 million for the 2013 and 2014 seasons to take pressure off the teams' ability to recruit and retain players. The salary cap is a key component of the negotiation between the ARU and the Rugby Union Players Association over the collective bargaining agreement. The fact that the Australian teams in Super Rugby face a salary cap has been attributed as a factor that makes it more difficult for Australian teams to win the title.

The cap regulations have some small concessions:

- Five players on each team may be paid A$30,000 each per season by team sponsors; this amount is not included in the team cap.
- The maximum cap charge for a non-Australian player is A$137,000, regardless of his actual wages.

Compared to other Australian 'rival' sporting leagues, such as the NRL and AFL, the salary cap is considerably lower. Two times lower than the AFL and only makes up 55% of the NRL salary cap. However the Australian Super Rugby salary cap stands greater than the A-League, the BBL and the NBL.

== Brand and image ==
=== Logo ===
During the last season of the Super 12, Coast Design of Sydney was commissioned to design a new logo for the Super 14. The Super 14 logo broke away from the traditional shield formats, common to many sporting codes, and used Roman numerals (XIV), which is unique for sport in the region. The game's dynamism and speed are suggested by the orbiting football which has three distinct stitches, a subtle reference to the three countries of the tournament.

The Super Rugby logo dispenses with numbers, featuring a large blue "S" with a white rugby ball in the centre and "SupeRugbY" below the "S". The three stitches of the previous ball are retained.

Before the expansion to the Super 14, the Super 12 used a logo in the shape of a shield, which had the sponsors name at the top, and then the words "Rugby" and "Super 12". The lower half of the logo used three different coloured stripes, green, black and gold, the respective colours of the national teams of South Africa, New Zealand and Australia.

=== Naming rights ===
The naming rights for the competition are different in the five countries:

- In New Zealand, Investec Bank has naming rights starting with the 2011 season, and the competition is referred to as Investec Super Rugby. During the Super 14 era, sporting goods retailer Rebel Sport had naming rights and the Super 14 competition was referred to as the Rebel Sport Super 14. Previously the naming rights holders were U-Bix and then Telecom New Zealand (TNZ). Telecom used its ISP brand Xtra as the label in their last year of holding naming rights.
- In Australia, telecommunications company Vodafone has been the title sponsor of Super Rugby since 2017 As a result, the competition is officially referred to as Vodafone Super Rugby. Prior to this, Super Rugby in Australia was sponsored by Suncorp Group through their life insurance brand Asteron Life. Vodafone were also the title sponsor of the competition during the Super 12 era. In the first season of Super Rugby, Australia had no naming rights partner. Previous to that, Investec acquired naming rights in the middle of the Super 14 era from Lion Nathan, who had named the competition the Tooheys New Super 14, after its Tooheys New beer brand.
- In South Africa, telecommunications carrier Vodacom has naming rights, and the expanded competition is referred to as Vodacom Super Rugby. Before 1999, when cigarette advertising was banned in South Africa, the competition was sponsored by Winfield.
- In Argentina, telecommunications carrier Personal has naming rights, and the expanded competition is referred to as Personal Super Rugby.
- In Japan, real estate developer Mitsubishi Estate acquired naming rights in 2018, the competition referred to as Mitsubishi Estate Super Rugby. The competition had no title sponsor in Japan during the 2016 and 2017 seasons.

== Competition records ==
=== Team records ===
==== Single match ====
- Highest score: 96 points – Crusaders defeated Waratahs 96–19, 2002
- Highest combined score: 137 points – Chiefs defeated Lions 72–65, 2010
- Lowest combined score: 6 points – Highlanders defeated Crusaders 6–0, 2009
- Highest winning margin: 89 points – Bulls defeated Reds 92–3, 2007
- Most tries in a match by both teams: 18 by Lions and Chiefs, 2010
- Most tries in a match by one team: 14 by Crusaders (v Waratahs), 2002; 14 by Cheetahs (v Sunwolves), 2016; 14 by Lions (v Sunwolves), 2017

==== Season ====
- Most points: 596 – Hurricanes, 2017
- Most points conceded: 684 – Southern Kings, 2016
- Fewest points: 82 – Brumbies, 2021; Force, 2021
- Fewest points conceded: 79 – Blues, 2021
- Best points difference: 324 – Hurricanes, 2017
- Worst points difference: −402 – Southern Kings, 2016
- Most points: 66 – Reds, 2011; Stormers, 2012; Chiefs, 2013; Hurricanes, 2015
- Fewest points: 0 – Bulls, 2002; Rebels, 2021; Waratahs, 2021
- Most wins: 14 – Stormers, 2012; Hurricanes, 2015; Crusaders, 2017; Lions, 2017
- Most defeats: 13 – Lions, 2010; Rebels, 2011; Highlanders, 2013; Force, 2016; Southern Kings, 2016; Sunwolves, 2016; Rebels, 2017; Moana Pasifika, 2023
- Most tries: 89 – Hurricanes, 2017
- Fewest tries: 11 – Force, 2021

=== Player records ===
==== Career ====
- Most Caps: 212 – James Slipper, Reds & Brumbies
- Points: 1,708 – Dan Carter, Crusaders
- Tries: 74 – Sevu Reece, Crusaders
- Conversions: 363 – Beauden Barrett, Hurricanes & Blues
- Penalties: 307 – Dan Carter, Crusaders
- Drop goals: 26 – Morné Steyn, Bulls

==== Season ====
- Points: 263 – Morné Steyn, Bulls, 2010
- Tries: 17 – Fehi Fineanganofo, Hurricanes, 2026; Josh Moorby, Hurricanes, 2026
- Conversions: 57 – Richie Mo'unga, Crusaders, 2023
- Penalties: 58 – Christian Leali'ifano, Brumbies, 2013

==== Match ====
- Points: 50 – Gavin Lawless, Sharks, 1997
- Tries: 5 – Sean Wainui, Chiefs, 2021; Macca Springer, Crusaders, 2025
- Conversions: 13 – Andrew Mehrtens, Crusaders, 2002
- Penalties: 9 – Elton Jantjies, Lions, 2012

== Domestic competitions ==
Each respective country competing in Super Rugby has a number of their own domestic leagues, which feed into Super Rugby teams.

In New Zealand, the National Provincial Championship is the most prominent domestic competition below the Super Rugby, in which all the respective Unions are also aligned with Super Rugby sides.

In Australia, there have been several domestic competitions, the most successful iteration so far being the National Rugby Championship (NRC), which was launched in 2014 and ran for five seasons before being cancelled due to the COVID-19 pandemic. Several teams that played in the former Australian Rugby Championship in 2007, were revived for the NRC. In 2025, the concept was revived with the launch of a new domestic competition, Super Rugby AUS, which runs alongside the U19s and U16s competitions.

Argentina, until 2018, like South Africa and New Zealand, had a national championship where several provincial unions competed, the Campeonato Argentino. Another national championship, but for clubs, is Nacional de Clubes.

Japan's main domestic competition was the Japan Rugby League One (formerly Top League), featuring 16 clubs, while the second division, the Top Challenge League, featured 8 clubs.

Fiji's domestic competition is the Skipper Cup, featuring the countries top 12 provincial sides.

== Media ==
Until 2020, in Australia, pay TV station Fox Sports showed every match live and beginning in 2016, free-to-air station Network Ten started showing a full match replay every Sunday morning of the 'Match of the Round' featuring at least one Australian team. Network Ten also showed full match replays of all finals matches featuring Australian teams. From 2021 onwards, Nine Network possesses the broadcasting rights, and any future Super Rugby seasons will have games aired live on streaming service Stan, with the potential for a number of games to be simulcast live on either Nine's flagship free-to-air channel or a multichannel, similar to the current situation with Super Rugby AU.

Super Rugby is broadcast on Supersport in South Africa and is simulcast terrestrially on M-Net. Sky Sport is the official broadcaster in New Zealand. Super Rugby was broadcast in over 40 countries – in the UK on Sky Sports; in Spain it is broadcast by Digital+, and in the United States by ESPN+, which has confirmed all matches will be broadcast live or on demand. In Canada, TSN broadcasts all matches only on TSN GO, their online SD streaming platform. Following the 2020 season though, broadcasting deals with European broadcasters ended, and no new deal had been arranged for the start of the 2021 season.

On 24 February 2021, RugbyPass announced streaming rights for the Super Rugby Aotearoa competition, to be streamed in all territories in the UK & Ireland, Europe, Asia and the Middle East, totalling 100 territories.

On 6 March 2021, World Rugby announced streaming for the Super Rugby AU competition, to be streamed in all territories in the UK & Ireland, Europe, Asia, and the Middle East, totalling over 100 territories.

On 19 March 2021, further broadcasters were announced for both competitions, with ESPN and ESPN International being announced as covering North and South America, Digicel covering the Pacific Islands and Papua New Guinea, Telefónica covering Spain and Wowow covering Japan.

On 13 May 2021, further broadcasters were announced for Super Rugby Trans-Tasman, with RugbyPass picking up streaming services in European territories again for the tournament. Canal+ was announced as covering France, ESPN Argentina covering the United States, Premier Sports covering Southeast Asia, Sky Italia covering Italy and TSN covering Canada.

On 14 February 2022, SANZAAR announced the launch of Sanzaarrugby.tv, a global streaming service for the Super Rugby competition to territories that don't have right holder broadcasters in place.

=== Broadcasters ===
Super Rugby Pacific broadcasters (as of 2026)
Territory	Rights holder	Ref.
Constituent countries
Australia	Nine; Stan Sport	
Fiji and Pacific Islands	Sky Pacific; FBC	
New Zealand	Sky Sport	
Other regions
Africa	SuperSport	
Canada	Premier Sports	
France; Monaco; Luxembourg; French-speaking Switzerland	Canal+	
Japan	Wowow	
South America and Caribbean	ESPN Latin America; ESPN Caribbean	
South East Asia	Premier Sports Asia	
Spain; Andorra	Movistar Plus+	
United Kingdom (Note: Includes England, Scotland, Wales, Northern Ireland, the Channel Islands and the Isle of Man.); Republic of Ireland	Sky UK	
United States	RugbyPass TV	

== Awards ==
=== Trophy ===
There have been several iterations of the Super Rugby trophy awarded to the winner of the Super Rugby competitions. The Super 14 trophy, unveiled in New Zealand ahead of the 2006 season, was made of sterling silver with the competition logo on a globe sitting atop of a four-sided twisted spiral. Jens Hansen Gold and Silversmith in Nelson, New Zealand hand-made the trophy which took over two months to complete.

On 30 June 2011, SANZAR unveiled the new trophy that would be presented to the winners of the Super Rugby final from 2011 and beyond. It was crafted from solid stainless steel and polished to a mirror finish, and stood at a height of 65 cm with an overall mass of 18 kilograms. The trophy was designed by Blue Sky Design of Sydney. The trophy was manufactured by Box and Dice Pty Ltd also based in Sydney. SANZAR CEO Greg Peters stated that "the shape of the trophy is centred around three curved legs, each representing the Conferences involved in the Super Rugby competition... The champions trophy is the 'big one', and will become the ultimate symbol of Super Rugby supremacy in the years to come." The colour on each leg corresponds to the Conferences with gold for Australia, black for New Zealand, and green for South Africa.

=== Player of the Year ===
The Player of the Year award was announced in 2025 as the premier individual honour in Super Rugby Pacific. Votes are awarded on a 3–2–1 basis in each regular season match by team captains and coaches, supplemented by a panel of rugby media representatives from Australia, New Zealand and Fiji. Voting results are publicly released each week until Round 10, after which they are kept confidential until the end of the season. The final standings not only determine the Player of the Year winner but also help inform the selection of the new Team of the Year, while also underpinning eligibility for the Rookie of the Year award.

One of the cited reasons for the introduction of the Player of the Year award was aimed to make Super Rugby more attractive to fans. The inaugural winner of the Player of the Year award was Moana Pasifika's Ardie Savea. Savea accrued 42 points across the season, eleven points clear of second-place Tom Hooper.

List of Player of the Year winners
Season	Player	Nationality	Team	Ref.
2025	Ardie Savea	New Zealand	Moana Pasifika	
2026	Quinn Tupaea	New Zealand	Chiefs	

=== Rookie of the Year ===
Announced in 2026, the Super Rugby Pacific expanded its end-of-season awards program by introducing a new award: Rookie of the Year. This new award added to the existing Player of the Year award, and the now active Team of the Year award. The Rookie of the Year is decided using Player of the Year voting, with eligibility limited to players who have made four or fewer Super Rugby Pacific (or equivalent top-level) appearances at the start of the season. CEO Jack Mesley said the additions are aimed at strengthening the awards framework, with the rookie award highlighting emerging talent making an immediate impact, and the Team of the Year recognising consistent excellence across all positions.

In June 2026, Sid Harvey of the Waratahs was announced as the competitions inaugural Rookie of the Year. He won with 27 votes, and sat above the Highlanders' Lucas Casey on 18.

List of Rookie of the Year winners
Season	Player	Nationality	Team	Ref.
2026	Sid Harvey	Australia	Waratahs	

=== Team of the Year ===
Announced at the conclusion of the 2025 season, the honorary Super Rugby Team of the Year was unveiled for 2025 featuring eight Australian players, five New Zealand players, and two Fijian players. The award became an official post-season recognition in Super Rugby Pacific alongside Player of the Year from 2026 onward.

The inaugural Super Rugby Team of the Year (2026) featured eight New Zealand players and seven Australian players. The Highlanders and Queensland Reds featured the most of all teams, with three players each.

== See also ==
- SANZAAR
- United Rugby Championship (URC)

== Bibliography ==
- Gifford, Phil (2004). The Passion – The Stories Behind 125 years of Canterbury Rugby. Wilson Scott Publishing. ISBN 0-9582535-1-X.
- Howitt, Bob (2005). SANZAR Saga – Ten Years of Super 12 and Tri-Nations Rugby. Harper Collins Publishers. ISBN 1-86950-566-2.
- McIlraith, Matt (2005). Ten Years of Super 12. Hodder Moa. ISBN 1-86971-025-8.
