= 2003 Super 12 season =

Men's rugby union club competition

2003 Super 12
- Countries: Australia; South Africa; New Zealand
- Tournament format(s): Round-robin and knockout
- Champions: (New Zealand) Auckland Blues (3rd title)
- Matches played: 69
- Attendance: 1,686,678 (24,445 per match)
- Top point scorer(s): (New Zealand) Carlos Spencer (143) (Auckland Blues)
- Top try scorer(s): (New Zealand) Doug Howlett (12) (Auckland Blues)

The 2003 Super 12 season was the eighth season of the Super 12, contested by teams from Australia, New Zealand and South Africa. The season ran from February to May 2003, with each team playing all the others once. At the end of the regular season, the top four teams entered the playoff semi finals, with the first placed team playing the fourth and the second placed team playing the third. The winner of each semi final qualified for the final, which was contested by the Blues and the Crusaders at Eden Park, Auckland. The Blues won 21–17 to win their third Super 12 title, and their first since 1997, it was their first Grand Final appearance since 1998.

== Table ==
Key to colours
Top four teams advance to playoffs.

	Team	Pld	W	D	L	PF	PA	PD	BP	Pts
1	(New Zealand) Blues	11	10	0	1	393	185	+208	9	49
2	(New Zealand) Crusaders	11	8	0	3	360	263	+97	8	40
3	(New Zealand) Hurricanes	11	7	0	4	324	277	+47	7	35
4	(Australia) Brumbies	11	6	0	5	358	313	+45	7	31
5	(Australia) Waratahs	11	6	0	5	313	344	−31	7	31
6	(South Africa) Bulls	11	6	0	5	320	354	−34	5	30
7	(New Zealand) Highlanders	11	6	0	5	287	246	+41	5	29
8	(Australia) Reds	11	5	0	6	281	318	−37	6	26
9	(South Africa) Stormers	11	5	0	6	255	353	−98	3	23
10	(New Zealand) Chiefs	11	2	0	9	257	274	−17	9	17
11	(South Africa) Sharks	11	3	0	8	239	306	−67	5	17
12	(South Africa) Cats	11	2	0	9	259	398	−139	4	12

== Results ==
=== Round 1 ===
21 February 2003
19:35

Waikato Chiefs (New Zealand)	16–29	(New Zealand) Otago Highlanders
Try: Paul Miller; Con: Glen Jackson; Pen: Glen Jackson (3)		Try: Aisea Tuilevu; Pen: Willie Walker (8)

Waikato Stadium, Hamilton
Attendance: 12,000

21 February 2003
19:40

NSW Waratahs (Australia)	18–31	(New Zealand) Auckland Blues
Try: Morgan Turinui; Duncan McRae; Con: Matt Burke (1/2); Pen: Matt Burke (3)		Try: Rupeni Caucaunibuca (2); Joe Rokocoko; David Gibson; Con: Orene Ai'i (1/4); Pen: Orene Ai'i (3)

Sydney Football Stadium, Sydney
Attendance: 27,247

21 February 2003
17:05

Golden Cats (South Africa)	26–34	(South Africa) Northern Bulls
Try: Gcobani Bobo; Friedrich Lombard; Con: André Pretorius (2/2); Pen: André Pretorius (4)		Try: Joost van der Westhuizen; Con: Louis Koen (1/1); Pen: Louis Koen (6); Drop: Louis Koen (3)

Free State Stadium, Bloemfontein
Attendance: 9,937

21 February 2003
19:10

Stormers (South Africa)	40–18	(South Africa) Coastal Sharks
Con: Chris Rossouw (3/5); Pen: Chris Rossouw (3)		Pen: Butch James

Newlands Stadium, Cape Town
Attendance: 44,533

22 February 2003
19:35

Canterbury Crusaders (New Zealand)	37–21	(New Zealand) Wellington Hurricanes
Try: Dan Carter (2); Caleb Ralph; Marika Vunibaka; Aaron Mauger; Con: Leon MacDonald (3/5); Pen: Leon MacDonald (2)		Try: Ma'a Nonu; Joe Ward; Con: Riki Flutey (1/2); Pen: Riki Flutey (3)

Jade Stadium, Christchurch
Attendance: 30,000

22 February 2003
18:40

Queensland Reds (Australia)	19–22	(Australia) ACT Brumbies
Try: Chris Latham; Con: Julian Huxley (1/1); Pen: Julian Huxley (4)		Try: Joe Roff; Con: Stirling Mortlock (1/1); Pen: Stirling Mortlock (5)

Ballymore Stadium, Brisbane
Attendance: 18,000

=== Round 2 ===
28 February 2003
19:35

Canterbury Crusaders (New Zealand)	34–6	(Australia) Queensland Reds
		Pen: Elton Flatley(2)

Jade Stadium, Christchurch
Attendance: 23,000
Referee: Mark Lawrence

1 March 2003
14:35

Otago Highlanders (New Zealand)	41–17	(South Africa) Stormers

Carisbrook, Dunedin
Attendance: 18,000

1 March 2003
17:35

Wellington Hurricanes (New Zealand)	34–46	(South Africa) Northern Bulls

McLean Park, Napier
Attendance: 10,000

1 March 2003
19:35

Waikato Chiefs (New Zealand)	27–30	(New Zealand) Auckland Blues

Waikato Stadium, Hamilton
Attendance: 10,000

1 March 2003
17:05

Coastal Sharks (South Africa)	25–17	(Australia) ACT Brumbies

Kings Park Stadium, Durban
Attendance: 32,000

1 March 2003
19:10

Golden Cats (South Africa)	36–48	(Australia) NSW Waratahs

Free State Stadium, Bloemfontein
Attendance: 22,000

=== Round 3 ===
7 March 2003
18:00

Otago Highlanders (New Zealand)	29–22	(South Africa) Northern Bulls

Rugby Park Stadium, Invercargill
Attendance: 14,500

7 March 2003
20:00

Wellington Hurricanes (New Zealand)	33–18	(South Africa) Stormers

Westpac Stadium, Wellington
Attendance: 25,600

7 March 2003
19:10

Golden Cats (South Africa)	34–32	(Australia) ACT Brumbies

Ellis Park, Johannesburg
Attendance: 25,237

8 March 2003
17:35

Waikato Chiefs (New Zealand)	43–27	(Australia) Queensland Reds

Waikato Stadium, Hamilton
Attendance: 11,000

8 March 2003
19:35

Auckland Blues (New Zealand)	39–5	(New Zealand) Canterbury Crusaders

North Harbour Stadium, Auckland
Attendance: 23,000

8 March 2003
17:05

Coastal Sharks (South Africa)	36–49	(Australia) NSW Waratahs

Kings Park Stadium, Durban
Attendance: 28,750

=== Round 4 ===
14 March 2003
19:35

Canterbury Crusaders (New Zealand)	36–29	(New Zealand) Waikato Chiefs

Jade Stadium, Christchurch
Attendance: 15,000
Referee: Steve Walsh

14 March 2003
19:40

ACT Brumbies (Australia)	37–22	(South Africa) Stormers

Canberra Stadium, Canberra
Attendance: 18,886

14 March 2003
19:10

Coastal Sharks (South Africa)	20–35	(New Zealand) Wellington Hurricanes

Kings Park Stadium, Durban
Attendance: 32,000

15 March 2003
19:40

NSW Waratahs (Australia)	26–16	(South Africa) Northern Bulls

Sydney Football Stadium, Sydney
Attendance: 28,587

15 March 2003
17:05

Golden Cats (South Africa)	33–21	(New Zealand) Otago Highlanders

Ellis Park, Johannesburg
Attendance: 30,000
Referee: Stuart Dickinson

=== Round 5 ===
21 March 2003
19:00

Auckland Blues (New Zealand)	62–20	(Australia) Queensland Reds

Okara Park, Whangārei
Attendance: 15,000

21 March 2003
20:00

NSW Waratahs (Australia)	29–39	(South Africa) Stormers

Sydney Football Stadium, Sydney
Attendance: 26,947

21 March 2003
19:10

Coastal Sharks (South Africa)	19–23	(New Zealand) Otago Highlanders

Kings Park Stadium, Durban
Attendance: 26,550

22 March 2003
19:40

ACT Brumbies (Australia)	64–26	(South Africa) Northern Bulls

Canberra Stadium, Canberra
Attendance: 20,240

22 March 2003
17:05

Golden Cats (South Africa)	21–28	(New Zealand) Wellington Hurricanes

Free State Stadium, Bloemfontein
Attendance: 15,000

=== Round 6 ===
28 March 2003
19:35

Auckland Blues (New Zealand)	41–15	(Australia) ACT Brumbies

Eden Park, Auckland
Attendance: 25,000

29 March 2003
20:10

NSW Waratahs (Australia)	23–35	(Australia) Queensland Reds

Sydney Football Stadium, Sydney
Attendance: 35,612

29 March 2003
17:00

Otago Highlanders (New Zealand)	16–17	(New Zealand) Canterbury Crusaders

Carisbrook, Dunedin
Attendance: 29,376

29 March 2003
19:05

Wellington Hurricanes (New Zealand)	24–14	(New Zealand) Waikato Chiefs

Westpac Stadium, Wellington
Attendance: 29,700

29 March 2003
17:05

Golden Cats (South Africa)	23–29	(South Africa) Coastal Sharks

Ellis Park, Johannesburg
Attendance: 48,000

=== Round 7 ===
4 April 2003
19:35

Otago Highlanders (New Zealand)	22–11	(New Zealand) Auckland Blues

Carisbrook, Dunedin
Attendance: 20,500

4 April 2003
20:00

Queensland Reds (Australia)	23–26	(New Zealand) Wellington Hurricanes

Ballymore Stadium, Brisbane
Attendance: 22,450

5 April 2003
19:40

NSW Waratahs (Australia)	34–31	(New Zealand) Canterbury Crusaders

Sydney Football Stadium, Sydney
Attendance: 32,960

5 April 2003
15:00

Northern Bulls (South Africa)	24–27	(South Africa) Stormers

Loftus Versfeld, Pretoria
Attendance: 50,000

6 April 2003
16:30

ACT Brumbies (Australia)	55–31	(New Zealand) Waikato Chiefs

Canberra Stadium, Canberra
Attendance: 18,154

=== Round 8 ===
11 April 2003
19:35

Wellington Hurricanes (New Zealand)	42–26	(Australia) NSW Waratahs

Westpac Stadium, Wellington
Attendance: 30,400

12 April 2003
17:30

Waikato Chiefs (New Zealand)	25–31	(South Africa) Coastal Sharks

Waikato Stadium, Hamilton
Attendance: 9,000

12 April 2003
19:35

Canterbury Crusaders (New Zealand)	65–34	(South Africa) Golden Cats

Jade Stadium, Christchurch
Attendance: 25,600

12 April 2003
15:00

Northern Bulls (South Africa)	28–56	(New Zealand) Auckland Blues

Loftus Versfeld, Pretoria
Attendance: 21,097

12 April 2003
17:05

Stormers (South Africa)	20–41	(Australia) Queensland Reds

Newlands Stadium, Cape Town
Attendance: 31,666

=== Round 9 ===
18 April 2003
19:35

Canterbury Crusaders (New Zealand)	23–18	(South Africa) Coastal Sharks

Jade Stadium, Christchurch
Attendance: 23,000

18 April 2003
19:40

ACT Brumbies (Australia)	41–15	(Australia) NSW Waratahs

Canberra Stadium, Canberra
Attendance: 25,122

19 April 2003
17:30

Waikato Chiefs (New Zealand)	40–9	(South Africa) Golden Cats

Rotorua International Stadium, Rotorua
Attendance: 7,000

19 April 2003
19:35

Wellington Hurricanes (New Zealand)	37–15	(New Zealand) Otago Highlanders

Yarrow Stadium, New Plymouth
Attendance: 15,647

19 April 2003
15:00

Stormers (South Africa)	8–36	(New Zealand) Auckland Blues

Newlands Stadium, Cape Town
Attendance: 30,568

19 April 2003
17:05

Northern Bulls (South Africa)	39–19	(Australia) Queensland Reds

Loftus Versfeld, Pretoria
Attendance: 15,628

=== Round 10 ===
25 April 2003
19:35

Otago Highlanders (New Zealand)	45–19	(Australia) ACT Brumbies

Carisbrook, Dunedin
Attendance: 14,300

26 April 2003
19:35

Auckland Blues (New Zealand)	25–16	(South Africa) Coastal Sharks

Eden Park, Auckland
Attendance: 25,000

26 April 2003
19:40

Queensland Reds (Australia)	41–13	(South Africa) Golden Cats

Ballymore Stadium, Brisbane
Attendance: 14,000

26 April 2003
15:00

Northern Bulls (South Africa)	32–31	(New Zealand) Canterbury Crusaders

Loftus Versfeld, Pretoria
Attendance: 24,107

26 April 2003
17:05

Stormers (South Africa)	24–23	(New Zealand) Waikato Chiefs

Newlands Stadium, Cape Town
Attendance: 21,529

=== Round 11 ===
2 May 2003
19:35

Auckland Blues (New Zealand)	33–9	(South Africa) Golden Cats

Eden Park, Auckland
Attendance: 14,000

2 May 2003
19:10

Northern Bulls (South Africa)	29–26	(New Zealand) Waikato Chiefs

Loftus Versfeld, Pretoria
Attendance: 26,544

3 May 2003
17:30

Otago Highlanders (New Zealand)	23–27	(Australia) NSW Waratahs

Carisbrook, Dunedin
Attendance: 15,200

3 May 2003
19:35

Wellington Hurricanes (New Zealand)	27–35	(Australia) ACT Brumbies

Westpac Stadium, Wellington
Attendance: 34,500

3 May 2003
19:40

Queensland Reds (Australia)	22–13	(South Africa) Coastal Sharks

Ballymore Stadium, Brisbane
Attendance: 16,577

3 May 2003
15:00

Stormers (South Africa)	13–51	(New Zealand) Canterbury Crusaders

Newlands Stadium, Cape Town
Attendance: 27,516

=== Round 12 ===
9 May 2003
19:35

Auckland Blues (New Zealand)	29–17	(New Zealand) Wellington Hurricanes

Eden Park, Auckland
Attendance: 45,000

9 May 2003
19:40

ACT Brumbies (Australia)	21–28	(New Zealand) Canterbury Crusaders

Canberra Stadium, Canberra
Attendance: 25,279

10 May 2003
17:35

Queensland Reds (Australia)	28–23	(New Zealand) Otago Highlanders

Ballymore Stadium, Brisbane
Attendance: 21,100

10 May 2003
19:40

NSW Waratahs (Australia)	25–14	(New Zealand) Waikato Chiefs

Sydney Football Stadium, Sydney
Attendance: 31,775

10 May 2003
15:00

Coastal Sharks (South Africa)	16–24	(South Africa) Northern Bulls

Kings Park Stadium, Durban
Attendance: 35,000

10 May 2003
17:05

Stormers (South Africa)	27–21	(South Africa) Golden Cats

Newlands Stadium, Cape Town
Attendance: 22,746

== Finals ==
=== Semi finals ===
16 May 2003
19:35

Canterbury Crusaders (New Zealand)	39–16	(New Zealand) Wellington Hurricanes

Jade Stadium, Christchurch
Attendance: 33,500

17 May 2003
19:35

Auckland Blues (New Zealand)	42–21	(Australia) ACT Brumbies

Eden Park, Auckland
Attendance: 42,000

=== Grand final ===
24 May 2003
19:35

Auckland Blues (New Zealand)	21–17	(New Zealand) Canterbury Crusaders
Try: Braid; Howlett; Con: Spencer (1/2); Pen: Spencer (3)		Try: Hammett (2); Ralph; Con: Carter (0/1); Mehrtens (1/2)

Eden Park, Auckland
Attendance: 45,000

Blues	Crusaders

== Attendances ==
Team	Main stadium	Capacity	Total attendance	Average attendance	% Capacity
(New Zealand) Blues	Eden Park	50,000	236,000	29,500	66%
(New Zealand) Chiefs	Waikato Stadium	25,800	49,000	9,800	37%
(New Zealand) Hurricanes	Westpac Stadium	34,500	145,847	24,307	77%
(New Zealand) Crusaders	Jade Stadium	36,500	150,100	25,016	68%
(New Zealand) Highlanders	Carisbrook	29,000	111,876	18,646	68%
(Australia) Reds	Ballymore Stadium	18,000	92,127	18,425	100%
(Australia) Brumbies	Canberra Stadium	25,011	107,681	21,536	86%
(Australia) Waratahs	Sydney Football Stadium	44,000	183,128	30,521	69%
(South Africa) Sharks	Kings Park Stadium	52,000	154,300	30,860	59%
(South Africa) Bulls	Loftus Versfeld	51,762	137,376	27,475	53%
(South Africa) Cats	Ellis Park	62,567	150,174	25,029	46%
(South Africa) Stormers	Newlands Stadium	51,900	178,558	29,759	57%
