= 2000 Super 12 season =

Men's rugby union club competition

2000 Super 12
- Countries: Australia; South Africa; New Zealand
- Tournament format(s): Round-robin and knockout
- Champions: (New Zealand) Crusaders (3rd title)
- Matches played: 69
- Top point scorer(s): (Australia) Stirling Mortlock (194) (ACT Brumbies)
- Top try scorer(s): (Australia) Andrew Walker (13) (ACT Brumbies)

The 2000 Super 12 season was the fifth season of the Super 12, an annual rugby union competition contested by teams from Australia, New Zealand and South Africa. The season ran from February to May 2000, with each team playing all the others once. At the end of the regular season, the top four teams entered the playoff semi finals, with the first placed team playing the fourth and the second placed team playing the third. The winner of each semi final qualified for the final, which was contested by the Crusaders and the Brumbies at Bruce Stadium, Canberra. The Crusaders won 20–19 to win their third consecutive Super 12 title.

== Table ==
Key to colours
Top four teams advance to playoffs

	Team	Pld	W	D	L	PF	PA	PD	BP	Pts
1	(Australia) Brumbies	11	9	0	2	393	196	+197	9	45
2	(New Zealand) Crusaders	11	8	0	3	369	293	+76	7	39
3	(New Zealand) Highlanders	11	6	0	5	320	280	+40	8	32
4	(South Africa) Cats	11	7	0	4	320	334	-14	4	32
5	(South Africa) Stormers	11	6	1	4	298	276	+22	5	31
6	(New Zealand) Blues	11	6	0	5	300	262	+38	6	30
7	(Australia) Reds	11	6	0	5	317	305	+12	6	30
8	(New Zealand) Hurricanes	11	6	0	5	308	329	−29	5	29
9	(Australia) Waratahs	11	5	0	6	273	258	+15	5	25
10	(New Zealand) Chiefs	11	3	0	8	257	352	−95	8	20
11	(South Africa) Bulls	11	1	2	8	231	395	−164	3	11
12	(South Africa) Sharks	11	1	1	9	235	341	−106	3	9

== Results ==
=== Round 1 ===
25 February 2000

Hurricanes (New Zealand)	40–23	(South Africa) Sharks

Westpac Stadium, Wellington
Attendance: 33,442

25 February 2000

Brumbies (Australia)	15–18	(New Zealand) Blues
Try: Andrew Walker (2); Con: Stirling Mortlock; Pen: Stirling Mortlock		Try: Charles Riechelmann; Finau Maka; Con: Adrian Cashmore; Pen: Adrian Cashmore (2)

Bruce Stadium, Canberra
Attendance: 14,000
Referee: Andre Watson (South Africa)

26 February 2000

Northern Bulls (South Africa)	19–23	(South Africa) Cats

Loftus Versfeld, Pretoria
Attendance: 43,000

26 February 2000

Highlanders (New Zealand)	50–13	(Australia) Reds
Try: Marc Ellis (2), Romi Ropati (2), Jeff Wilson, Rico Gear; Con: Tony Brown (4); Pen: Tony Brown (4)		Try: Chris Latham; Con: Shane Drahm; Pen: Shane Drahm (2)

Carisbrook, Dunedin
Referee: Tappe Henning (South Africa)

26 February 2000

Stormers (South Africa)	22–15	(Australia) Waratahs

Newlands Stadium, Cape Town
Attendance: 44,000

27 February 2000

Chiefs (New Zealand)	24–27	(New Zealand) Crusaders
Try: Chresten Davis, Loki Crichton; Con: Glen Jackson; Pen: Glen Jackson (4)		Try: Caleb Ralph, Todd Blackadder; Con: Andrew Mehrtens (3); Pen: Andrew Mehrtens (4); Drop: Aaron Mauger

Waikato Stadium, Hamilton
Referee: Paddy O'Brien (New Zealand)

=== Round 2 ===
3 March 2000

Highlanders (New Zealand)	27–20	(South Africa) Sharks

Carisbrook, Dunedin

4 March 2000

Hurricanes (New Zealand)	43–25	(Australia) Reds
Try: Tana Umaga (3), Christian Cullen, Jason O'Halloran, Jonah Lomu; Con: David Holwell (5); Pen: David Holwell		Try: Damian Smith, Fletcher Dyson, Sam Cordingley; Con: Shane Drahm (2); Pen: Shane Drahm (2)

Yarrow Stadium, New Plymouth
Referee: Andy Turner (South Africa)

4 March 2000

Cats (South Africa)	22–18	(South Africa) Stormers

Ellis Park, Johannesburg
Attendance: 26,500

4 March 2000

Northern Bulls (South Africa)	13–33	(Australia) Waratahs

Loftus Versfeld, Pretoria

5 March 2000

Blues (New Zealand)	25–32	(New Zealand) Chiefs

North Harbour, Auckland
Attendance: 25,000

=== Round 3 ===
10 March 2000

Crusaders (New Zealand)	32–20	(New Zealand) Blues
Try: Caleb Ralph, Leon MacDonald, Scott Robertson; Con: Andrew Mehrtens; Pen: Andrew Mehrtens (3); Drop: Andrew Mehrtens		Try: Troy Flavell (2), Mark Robinson; Con: Hayden Taylor; Pen: Hayden Taylor

Jade Stadium, Christchurch
Referee: Kelvin Deaker (New Zealand)

10 March 2000

Brumbies (Australia)	51–10	(South Africa) Sharks
Try: Andrew Walker (3); Mark Bartholomeusz (2); Jim Williams; Joe Roff; Con: Stirling Mortlock (5); Pen: Stirling Mortlock (2)		Try: Clinton van Rensburg; Con: Gaffie du Toit; Pen: Gaffie du Toit

Bruce Stadium, Canberra
Attendance: 10,900
Referee: Steve Walsh (New Zealand)

11 March 2000

Highlanders (New Zealand)	35–19	(New Zealand) Hurricanes

Carisbrook, Dunedin

11 March 2000

Waratahs (Australia)	51–16	(South Africa) Cats

Sydney Football Stadium, Sydney
Attendance: 20,024

11 March 2000

Stormers (South Africa)	19–19	(South Africa) Northern Bulls

Newlands Stadium, Cape Town
Attendance: 45,177

=== Round 4 ===
17 March 2000

Highlanders (New Zealand)	33–31	(South Africa) Cats

Carisbrook, Dunedin

18 March 2000

Waratahs (Australia)	19–26	(South Africa) Sharks

Sydney Football Stadium, Sydney

18 March 2000

Chiefs (New Zealand)	19–24	(New Zealand) Hurricanes

Waikato Stadium, Hamilton

18 March 2000

Reds (Australia)	19–27	(New Zealand) Crusaders
Try: Chris Latham; Con: Shane Drahm; Pen: Shane Drahm (4)		Try: Justin Marshall, Leon MacDonald, Ron Cribb; Con: Andrew Mehrtens (3); Pen: Andrew Mehrtens (2)

Ballymore Stadium, Brisbane
Attendance: 18,500
Referee: Andre Watson (South Africa)

18 March 2000

Stormers (South Africa)	15–29	(Australia) Brumbies
Pen: Percy Montgomery (5)		Try: Owen Finegan (2); Ipolito Fenukitau; Stirling Mortlock; Con: Stirling Mortlock (3); Pen: Stirling Mortlock

Newlands Stadium, Cape Town
Attendance: 35,177
Referee: Paddy O'Brien (New Zealand)

=== Round 5 ===
24 March 2000

Blues (New Zealand)	31–17	(Australia) Waratahs

Eden Park, Auckland

25 March 2000

Hurricanes (New Zealand)	29–23	(South Africa) Cats

Arena Manawatu, Palmerston North

25 March 2000

Northern Bulls (South Africa)	19–28	(Australia) Brumbies
Try: Anton Leonard; Con: Jannie de Beer; Pen: Jannie de Beer (3); Drop: Jannie de Beer		Try: Mark Bartholomeusz (2); George Gregan; Con: Stirling Mortlock (2); Pen: Stirling Mortlock (3)

Loftus Versfeld, Pretoria
Attendance: 18,514
Referee: Kelvin Deaker (New Zealand)

25 March 2000

Crusaders (New Zealand)	47–31	(South Africa) Stormers
Try: Marika Vunibaka (2), Caleb Ralph, Justin Marshall, Ron Cribb, Todd Blackadder; Con: Andrew Mehrtens (3), Leon MacDonald; Pen: Andrew Mehrtens (3)		Try: Chean Roux (2), De Wet Barry, Cobus Visagie; Con: Braam van Straaten (2), Dan van Zyl, Percy Montgomery; Pen: Braam van Straaten

Trafalgar Park, Nelson
Referee: Stuart Dickinson (Australia)

25 March 2000

Reds (Australia)	37–17	(New Zealand) Chiefs

Ballymore Stadium, Brisbane

=== Round 6 ===
31 March 2000

Hurricanes (New Zealand)	14–25	(New Zealand) Blues

Westpac Stadium, Wellington
Attendance: 33,666

1 April 2000

Northern Bulls (South Africa)	14–14	(South Africa) Sharks

Loftus Versfeld, Pretoria
Attendance: 21,000

1 April 2000

Reds (Australia)	31–16	(Australia) Waratahs

Ballymore Stadium, Brisbane

1 April 2000

Crusaders (New Zealand)	42–36	(New Zealand) Highlanders
Try: Ron Cribb (2), Caleb Ralph, Marika Vunibaka, Norm Berryman; Con: Andrew Mehrtens (4); Pen: Andrew Mehrtens (3)		Try: Karl Te Nana, Kelvin Middleton, Pita Alatini, Rua Tipoki; Con: Rua Tipoki, Tony Brown; Pen: Tony Brown (3); Drop: Tony Brown

Jade Stadium, Christchurch
Referee: Steve Walsh (New Zealand)

1 April 2000

Brumbies (Australia)	64–0	(South Africa) Cats
Try: Owen Finegan (3); Andrew Walker; Graeme Bond; Ipolito Fenukitau; Joe Roff; Mark Bartholomeusz; Stirling Mortlock; Con: Stirling Mortlock (8); Pen: Stirling Mortlock

Bruce Stadium, Canberra
Referee: Colin Hawke (New Zealand)

2 April 2000

Chiefs (New Zealand)	25–28	(South Africa) Stormers

Growers Stadium, Pukekohe

=== Round 7 ===
7 April 2000

Hurricanes (New Zealand)	28–22	(New Zealand) Crusaders
Try: Christian Cullen (2), Jonah Lomu (2); Con: David Holwell (4)		Try: Marika Vunibaka, Todd Blackadder; Pen: Andrew Mehrtens (4)

Westpac Stadium, Wellington
Attendance: 32,697
Referee: Paddy O'Brien (New Zealand)

7 April 2000

Brumbies (Australia)	34–15	(New Zealand) Highlanders
Try: Andrew Walker; David Giffin; Joe Roff; Stephen Larkham; Con: Stirling Mortlock; Pen: Stirling Mortlock (4)		Pen: Tony Brown (5)

Bruce Stadium, Canberra
Attendance: 15,028
Referee: Andre Watson (South Africa)

8 April 2000

Sharks (South Africa)	27–28	(South Africa) Cats

Kings Park Stadium, Durban
Attendance: 36,000

8 April 2000

Reds (Australia)	34–15	(South Africa) Northern Bulls

Ballymore Stadium, Brisbane

8 April 2000

Blues (New Zealand)	18–39	(South Africa) Stormers

Eden Park, Auckland

9 April 2000

Chiefs (New Zealand)	30–37	(Australia) Waratahs

Waikato Stadium, Hamilton
Attendance: 2,500

=== Round 8 ===
14 April 2000

Reds (Australia)	37–24	(South Africa) Stormers

Ballymore Stadium, Brisbane

14 April 2000

Blues (New Zealand)	26–16	(New Zealand) Highlanders

Eden Park, Auckland

15 April 2000

Waratahs (Australia)	30–25	(Australia) Brumbies
Try: Matt Burke; Scott Staniforth; Con: Matt Burke; Pen: Matt Burke (6)		Try: Andrew Walker; Bill Young; Jim Williams; Con: Stirling Mortlock (2); Pen: Stirling Mortlock (2)

Sydney Football Stadium, Sydney
Attendance: 33,987
Referee: Stuart Dickinson (Australia)

15 April 2000

Sharks (South Africa)	24–32	(New Zealand) Crusaders
Try: Pieter Muller (2), Jacques Greeff; Con: Gaffie du Toit (3); Pen: Gaffie du Toit		Try: Caleb Ralph, Leon MacDonald, Mark Mayerhofler, Ron Cribb; Con: Andrew Mehrtens (3); Pen: Andrew Mehrtens (2)

Kings Park Stadium, Durban
Attendance: 26,965
Referee: Scott Young (Australia)

15 April 2000

Chiefs (New Zealand)	40–7	(South Africa) Northern Bulls

Rotorua International Stadium, Rotorua
Attendance: 8,000

=== Round 9 ===
21 April 2000

Highlanders (New Zealand)	38–6	(New Zealand) Chiefs

Carisbrook, Dunedin

21 April 2000

Brumbies (Australia)	47–28	(New Zealand) Hurricanes
Try: Joe Roff; Mark Bartholomeusz; Patricio Noriega; Rod Kafer; Con: Stirling Mortlock (3); Pen: Stirling Mortlock (5); Andrew Walker; Drop: Rod Kafer		Try: Alama Ieremia; David Holwell; Jonah Lomu; Con: David Holwell (2); Pen: David Holwell (3)

Bruce Stadium, Canberra
Attendance: 16,271
Referee: Tappe Henning (South Africa)

22 April 2000

Blues (New Zealand)	54–11	(South Africa) Northern Bulls

Eden Park, Auckland

22 April 2000

Sharks (South Africa)	13–24	(Australia) Reds

Kings Park Stadium, Durban
Attendance: 20,541

22 April 2000

Cats (South Africa)	54–31	(New Zealand) Crusaders
Try: Thinus Delport (2), Grant Esterhuizen, Japie Mulder, Rassie Erasmus, Werner Swanepoel; Con: Louis Koen (6); Pen: Louis Koen (3); Drop: Louis Koen		Try: Afato So'oalo, Greg Feek, Leon MacDonald; Con: Andrew Mehrtens (2); Pen: Andrew Mehrtens (4)

Ellis Park, Johannesburg
Referee: Andrew Cole (Australia)

=== Round 10 ===
28 April 2000

Crusaders (New Zealand)	75–27	(South Africa) Northern Bulls
Try: Caleb Ralph (3), Marika Vunibaka (3), Justin Marshall (2), Chris Jack, Dallas Seymour, Scott Robertson; Con: Aaron Mauger (6), Andrew Mehrtens (4)		Try: Frikkie Welsh, Henry Pedro, Jaco van der Westhuyzen; Con: Jannie de Beer (3); Pen: Jannie de Beer; Drop: Jannie de Beer

Jade Stadium, Christchurch
Referee: Wayne Erickson (Australia)

29 April 2000

Cats (South Africa)	36–32	(Australia) Reds

Free State Stadium, Bloemfontein
Attendance: 22,000

29 April 2000

Chiefs (New Zealand)	17–45	(Australia) Brumbies
Try: George Leaupepe; Pen: Glen Jackson (4)		Try: Andrew Walker (3); Jeremy Paul; Stephen Larkham; Stirling Mortlock; Con: Stirling Mortlock (6); Pen: Stirling Mortlock

Rugby Park, Hamilton
Referee: Jonathan Kaplan (South Africa)

29 April 2000

Stormers (South Africa)	27–13	(New Zealand) Highlanders

Newlands Stadium, Cape Town
Attendance: 40,152

29 April 2000

Waratahs (Australia)	20–27	(New Zealand) Hurricanes

Sydney Football Stadium, Sydney
Attendance: 32,888

30 April 2000

Sharks (South Africa)	19–30	(New Zealand) Blues

Kings Park Stadium, Durban
Attendance: 23,524

=== Round 11 ===
5 May 2000

Crusaders (New Zealand)	22–13	(Australia) Waratahs
Try: Marika Vunibaka (2), Justin Marshall, Leon MacDonald; Con: Leon MacDonald		Try: Christian Warner; Con: Matt Burke; Pen: Matthew Burke (2)

Jade Stadium, Christchurch
Attendance: 20,000
Referee: Tappe Henning (South Africa)

5 May 2000

Cats (South Africa)	34–27	(New Zealand) Blues

Ellis Park, Johannesburg
Attendance: 28,000

6 May 2000

Sharks (South Africa)	31–44	(New Zealand) Chiefs

Kings Park Stadium, Durban

6 May 2000

Brumbies (Australia)	38–32	(Australia) Reds
Try: Mark Bartholomeusz; Stirling Mortlock; Rod Kafer; Stephen Larkham; Con: Stirling Mortlock (3); Pen: Stirling Mortlock (4); Cards: George Gregan (yellow card)		Try: Matt Cockbain; Sam Cordingley; Con: Shane Drahm (2); Pen: Shane Drahm (6)

Canberra Stadium, Canberra
Attendance: 19,984

6 May 2000

Northern Bulls (South Africa)	40–42	(New Zealand) Highlanders

Puma Stadium, Witbank

7 May 2000

Stormers (South Africa)	43–23	(New Zealand) Hurricanes

Newlands Stadium, Cape Town
Attendance: 42,446

=== Round 12 ===
12 May 2000

Waratahs (Australia)	22–15	(New Zealand) Highlanders

Sydney Football Stadium, Sydney
Attendance: 23,000

12 May 2000

Northern Bulls (South Africa)	47–33	(New Zealand) Hurricanes

Loftus Versfeld, Pretoria

12 May 2000

Crusaders (New Zealand)	12–17	(Australia) Brumbies
Pen: Leon MacDonald (4)		Try: Andrew Walker; Mitch Hardy; Con: Stirling Mortlock (2); Pen: Stirling Mortlock

Jade Stadium, Christchurch
Referee: Andre Watson (South Africa)

12 May 2000

Sharks (South Africa)	28–32	(South Africa) Stormers

Kings Park Stadium, Durban

13 May 2000

Cats (South Africa)	53–3	(New Zealand) Chiefs

Free State Stadium, Bloemfontein

13 May 2000

Reds (Australia)	33–26	(New Zealand) Blues

Ballymore Stadium, Brisbane

== Finals ==
=== Semi finals ===
20 May 2000

Brumbies (Australia)	28–5	(South Africa) Cats
Try: Andrew Walker; Joe Roff; Mitch Hardy; Con: Stirling Mortlock (2); Pen: Stirling Mortlock (3)		Try: Jannie van der Walt

Bruce Stadium, Canberra
Attendance: 25,126
Referee: Paddy O'Brien (New Zealand)

20 May 2000

Crusaders (New Zealand)	37–15	(New Zealand) Highlanders
Try: Marika Vunibaka (2), Ron Cribb; Con: Andrew Mehrtens (2); Pen: Andrew Mehrtens (6)		Try: Byron Kelleher, Simon Maling; Con: Brendan Laney; Pen: Tony Brown

Jade Stadium, Christchurch
Referee: Wayne Erickson (Australia)

=== Grand final ===
27 May 2000

Brumbies (Australia)	19–20	(New Zealand) Crusaders
Try: George Smith; Con: Stirling Mortlock; Pen: Stirling Mortlock (4)		Try: Ron Cribb; Pen: Andrew Mehrtens (5)

Bruce Stadium, Canberra
Attendance: 27,489
Referee: Andre Watson (South Africa)

Brumbies	Crusaders

15	Andrew Walker
14	Joe Roff
13	Rod Kafer
12	Stirling Mortlock
11	Mark Bartholomeusz
10	Stephen Larkham
9	George Gregan (c)
8	Jim Williams
7	Ipolito Fenukitau
6	Brett Robinson (c)
5	Justin Harrison
4	David Giffin
3	Patricio Noriega
2	Jeremy Paul
1	Bill Young
Substitutes:
Coach:
(Australia) Eddie Jones

15	Leon MacDonald
14	Caleb Ralph
13	Daryl Gibson
12	Mark Robinson
11	Marika Vunibaka
10	Andrew Mehrtens
9	Ben Hurst
8	Ron Cribb
7	Reuben Thorne
6	Scott Robertson
5	Norm Maxwell
4	Todd Blackadder (c)
3	Greg Feek
2	Mark Hammett
1	Greg Somerville
Substitutions:
Coach:
(New Zealand) Robbie Deans

== Individual records ==
=== Top point scorers ===
Name	Tries	Convs	Pens	DGs	Total
Stirling Mortlock	4	39	32	—	194
Andrew Mehrtens	—	25	36	1	161
Willem de Waal	—	8	10	—	46
Peter Grant	—	10	5	—	35
Justin Peach	1	6	5	—	32

=== Top try scorers ===
Name	Tries
Andrew Walker	13
Marika Vunibaka	11
Christian Cullen	10
Breyton Paulse	10
Caleb Ralph	8
