= 2002 Super 12 season =

Men's rugby union club competition

2002 Super 12
- Countries: Australia; South Africa; New Zealand
- Tournament format(s): Round-robin and knockout
- Champions: (New Zealand) Canterbury Crusaders (4th title)
- Matches played: 69
- Top point scorer(s): (New Zealand) Andrew Mehrtens (182) (Canterbury Crusaders)
- Top try scorer(s): (New Zealand) Roger Randle (12) (Waikato Chiefs)

The 2002 Super 12 season was the seventh season of the Super 12, an annual rugby union competition contested by teams from Australia, New Zealand and South Africa. The season ran from February to May 2002, with each team playing all the others once. At the end of the regular season, the top four teams entered the playoff semi finals, with the first placed team playing the fourth and the second placed team playing the third. The winner of each semi final qualified for the final, which was contested by the Crusaders and the Brumbies at Jade Stadium, Christchurch. The Crusaders won 31–13 to win their fourth Super 12 title.

== Table ==
Key to colours
Top four teams advance to playoffs

Pos	Team	Pld	W	D	L	PF	PA	PD	BP	Pts
1	(New Zealand) Crusaders	11	11	0	0	469	264	+205	7	51
2	(Australia) Waratahs	11	8	0	3	337	284	+53	7	39
3	(Australia) Brumbies	11	7	0	4	374	230	+144	10	38
4	(New Zealand) Highlanders	11	8	0	3	329	207	+122	6	38
5	(Australia) Reds	11	7	0	4	336	287	+49	6	34
6	(New Zealand) Blues	11	6	0	5	318	249	+69	5	29
7	(South Africa) Stormers	11	5	0	6	310	314	−4	7	27
8	(New Zealand) Chiefs	11	4	0	7	323	341	−18	8	24
9	(New Zealand) Hurricanes	11	5	0	6	232	317	−85	3	23
10	(South Africa) Sharks	11	4	0	7	221	309	−88	3	19
11	(South Africa) Cats	11	1	0	10	228	407	−179	2	6
12	(South Africa) Bulls	11	0	0	11	232	500	−268	1	1

== Results ==
=== Round 1 ===
22 February 2002

Coastal Sharks (South Africa)	18–25	(South Africa) Stormers
Try: Stefan Terblanche (2); Con: Gaffie du Toit; Pen: Gaffie du Toit (2)		Try: Marius Goosen; Percy Montgomery; Pieter Rossouw; Con: Marius Goosen (2); Pen: Marius Goosen; Drop: Bolla Conradie

Kings Park Stadium, Durban
Referee: Andre Watson (South Africa)

22 February 2002

Wellington Hurricanes (New Zealand)	7–60	(New Zealand) Auckland Blues
Try: Jason Spice; Con: Daryl Lilley		Try: Doug Howlett (4); Rupeni Caucaunibuca (2); Mark Mayerhofler; Troy Flavell; Con: Carlos Spencer (6); James Arlidge; Pen: Carlos Spencer (2)

Westpac Stadium, Wellington
Attendance: 31,000
Referee: Paddy O'Brien (New Zealand)

23 February 2002

Canterbury Crusaders (New Zealand)	30–28	(New Zealand) Otago Highlanders
Try: Andrew Mehrtens; Joe Maddock; Con: Andrew Mehrtens; Pen: Andrew Mehrtens (6)		Try: Jeff Wilson; Ryan Nicholas; Willie Walker; Con: Tony Brown (2); Pen: Tony Brown (3)

Jade Stadium, Christchurch
Referee: Paul Honiss (New Zealand)

23 February 2002

Waikato Chiefs (New Zealand)	25–42	(Australia) NSW Waratahs

Rotorua International Stadium, Rotorua

23 February 2002

Northern Bulls (South Africa)	31–44	(South Africa) Golden Cats

Loftus Versfeld, Pretoria

23 February 2002

ACT Brumbies (Australia)	29–19	(Australia) Queensland Reds

Canberra Stadium, Canberra

=== Round 2 ===
1 March 2002

Waikato Chiefs (New Zealand)	27–34	(New Zealand) Canterbury Crusaders
Try: Mark Ranby; Roger Randle; Todd Miller; Con: David Hill (3); Pen: David Hill (2)		Try: Aaron Mauger; Daryl Gibson; Joe Maddock; Con: Andrew Mehrtens (2); Pen: Andrew Mehrtens (4); Drop: Aaron Mauger

Rugby Park, Hamilton
Attendance: 25,000
Referee: Kelvin Deaker (New Zealand)

2 March 2002

ACT Brumbies (Australia)	64–16	(South Africa) Golden Cats

Canberra Stadium, Canberra

2 March 2002

Northern Bulls (South Africa)	18–37	(New Zealand) Wellington Hurricanes

Loftus Versfeld, Pretoria

2 March 2002

Otago Highlanders (New Zealand)	45–5	(South Africa) Coastal Sharks
Try: Anton Oliver; Craig Newby; Jeff Wilson; Joe McDonnell; Romi Ropati; Con: Tony Brown (4); Pen: Tony Brown (4)		Try: Nicky van der Walt

Carisbrook, Dunedin
Referee: Wayne Erickson (Australia)

2 March 2002

Queensland Reds (Australia)	34–23	(New Zealand) Auckland Blues

Ballymore Stadium, Brisbane

2 March 2002

Stormers (South Africa)	25–26	(Australia) NSW Waratahs

Newlands Stadium, Cape Town

=== Round 3 ===
8 March 2002

ACT Brumbies (Australia)	38–8	(South Africa) Coastal Sharks

Canberra Stadium, Canberra

8 March 2002

Otago Highlanders (New Zealand)	40–8	(South Africa) Golden Cats

Carisbrook, Dunedin

8 March 2002

Stormers (South Africa)	40–13	(New Zealand) Wellington Hurricanes

Newlands Stadium, Cape Town

9 March 2002

Northern Bulls (South Africa)	19–51	(Australia) NSW Waratahs

Loftus Versfeld, Pretoria

9 March 2002

Canterbury Crusaders (New Zealand)	30–11	(New Zealand) Auckland Blues

Jade Stadium, Christchurch

9 March 2002

Queensland Reds (Australia)	27–13	(New Zealand) Waikato Chiefs

Ballymore Stadium, Brisbane

=== Round 4 ===
15 March 2002

Wellington Hurricanes (New Zealand)	40–17	(South Africa) Coastal Sharks

Westpac Stadium, Wellington
Attendance: 28,000

16 March 2002

Northern Bulls (South Africa)	35–45	(Australia) ACT Brumbies

Loftus Versfeld, Pretoria

16 March 2002

Stormers (South Africa)	20–21	(New Zealand) Otago Highlanders

Newlands Stadium, Cape Town

16 March 2002

NSW Waratahs (Australia)	44–21	(South Africa) Golden Cats

Sydney Football Stadium, Sydney
Attendance: 29,344

17 March 2002

Queensland Reds (Australia)	27–34	(New Zealand) Canterbury Crusaders

Ballymore Stadium, Brisbane

=== Round 5 ===
22 March 2002

Northern Bulls (South Africa)	17–54	(New Zealand) Otago Highlanders

Loftus Versfeld, Pretoria

22 March 2002

Wellington Hurricanes (New Zealand)	30–21	(South Africa) Golden Cats

Westpac Stadium, Wellington
Attendance: 30,000

23 March 2002

Auckland Blues (New Zealand)	37–30	(New Zealand) Waikato Chiefs

Eden Park, Auckland
Attendance: 28,000

23 March 2002

Stormers (South Africa)	15–36	(Australia) ACT Brumbies

Newlands Stadium, Cape Town

23 March 2002

NSW Waratahs (Australia)	42–8	(South Africa) Coastal Sharks

Sydney Football Stadium, Sydney
Attendance: 28,058

=== Round 6 ===
29 March 2002

Auckland Blues (New Zealand)	22–20	(Australia) NSW Waratahs

North Harbour Stadium, Auckland
Attendance: 22,000

30 March 2002

Wellington Hurricanes (New Zealand)	22–18	(Australia) Queensland Reds

Arena Manawatu, Palmerston North

30 March 2002

Otago Highlanders (New Zealand)	24–29	(New Zealand) Waikato Chiefs

Rugby Park Stadium, Invercargill

31 March 2002

Canterbury Crusaders (New Zealand)	33–32	(Australia) ACT Brumbies

Jade Stadium, Christchurch

=== Round 7 ===
5 April 2002

Otago Highlanders (New Zealand)	19–10	(New Zealand) Wellington Hurricanes

Carisbrook, Dunedin

6 April 2002

Coastal Sharks (South Africa)	20–13	(New Zealand) Auckland Blues

Kings Park Stadium, Durban

6 April 2002

Queensland Reds (Australia)	49–46	(South Africa) Stormers

Ballymore Stadium, Brisbane

6 April 2002

Canterbury Crusaders (New Zealand)	49–15	(South Africa) Northern Bulls

Jade Stadium, Christchurch

6 April 2002

Golden Cats (South Africa)	25–36	(New Zealand) Waikato Chiefs

Free State Stadium, Bloemfontein

=== Round 8 ===
12 April 2002

Golden Cats (South Africa)	12–24	(New Zealand) Auckland Blues

Free State Stadium, Bloemfontein
Attendance: 10,000

12 April 2002

Canterbury Crusaders (New Zealand)	41–21	(South Africa) Stormers

Jade Stadium, Christchurch
Attendance: 27,000

12 April 2002

Queensland Reds (Australia)	48–12	(South Africa) Northern Bulls

Ballymore Stadium, Brisbane

13 April 2002

Coastal Sharks (South Africa)	21–18	(New Zealand) Waikato Chiefs

Kings Park Stadium, Durban
Attendance: 26,000

13 April 2002

NSW Waratahs (Australia)	31–13	(New Zealand) Otago Highlanders

Sydney Football Stadium, Sydney
Attendance: 35,254

14 April 2002

ACT Brumbies (Australia)	13–20	(New Zealand) Wellington Hurricanes

Canberra Stadium, Canberra
Attendance: 21,011

=== Round 9 ===
19 April 2002

Auckland Blues (New Zealand)	65–24	(South Africa) Northern Bulls

Eden Park, Auckland
Attendance: 26,640

20 April 2002

Golden Cats (South Africa)	15–27	(Australia) Queensland Reds

Ellis Park, Johannesburg

20 April 2002

Waikato Chiefs (New Zealand)	33–45	(South Africa) Stormers

Waikato Stadium, Hamilton

20 April 2002

Coastal Sharks (South Africa)	34–37	(New Zealand) Canterbury Crusaders

Kings Park Stadium, Durban
Attendance: 30,000

20 April 2002

NSW Waratahs (Australia)	19–11	(Australia) ACT Brumbies

Sydney Football Stadium, Sydney
Attendance: 41,645

=== Round 10 ===
26 April 2002

Auckland Blues (New Zealand)	25–6	(South Africa) Stormers

Eden Park, Auckland

26 April 2002

ACT Brumbies (Australia)	18–25	(New Zealand) Otago Highlanders

Canberra Stadium, Canberra

26 April 2002

Golden Cats (South Africa)	30–37	(New Zealand) Canterbury Crusaders

Ellis Park, Johannesburg

27 April 2002

Coastal Sharks (South Africa)	29–30	(Australia) Queensland Reds

Kings Park Stadium, Durban

27 April 2002

Waikato Chiefs (New Zealand)	53–24	(South Africa) Northern Bulls

Waikato Stadium, Hamilton

27 April 2002

NSW Waratahs (Australia)	19–13	(New Zealand) Wellington Hurricanes

Sydney Football Stadium, Sydney
Attendance: 37,288

=== Round 11 ===
3 May 2002

Auckland Blues (New Zealand)	13–20	(New Zealand) Otago Highlanders

Eden Park, Auckland

4 May 2002

Northern Bulls (South Africa)	10–23	(South Africa) Coastal Sharks

Loftus Versfeld, Pretoria

4 May 2002

Golden Cats (South Africa)	25–36	(South Africa) Stormers

Ellis Park, Johannesburg

4 May 2002

Waikato Chiefs (New Zealand)	15–42	(Australia) ACT Brumbies

Rotorua International Stadium, Rotorua

4 May 2002

Wellington Hurricanes (New Zealand)	20–48	(New Zealand) Canterbury Crusaders

Westpac Stadium, Wellington
Attendance: 34,500

5 May 2002

Queensland Reds (Australia)	31–24	(Australia) NSW Waratahs

Ballymore Stadium, Brisbane

=== Round 12 ===
10 May 2002

Waikato Chiefs (New Zealand)	44–20	(New Zealand) Wellington Hurricanes

Waikato Stadium, Hamilton
Attendance: 25,000

10 May 2002

ACT Brumbies (Australia)	46–25	(New Zealand) Auckland Blues
Try: Graeme Bond; Andrew Walker; Stephen Larkham; Stirling Mortlock; Con: Andrew Walker (3); Pen: Andrew Walker (3); Stirling Mortlock (2)		Try: Doug Howlett; Rico Gear; Samiu Vahafolau; Con: Carlos Spencer (2); Pen: Carlos Spencer (2)

Bruce Stadium, Canberra
Attendance: 23,623
Referee: Tappe Henning (South Africa)

11 May 2002

Canterbury Crusaders (New Zealand)	96–19	(Australia) NSW Waratahs
Try: Caleb Ralph (4); Leon MacDonald (2); Marika Vunibaka (2); Scott Robertson (2); Aaron Mauger; Daryl Gibson; Greg Feek; Justin Marshall; Con: Andrew Mehrtens (13)		Try: Des Tuiavii; Francis Cullimore; Marc Stcherbina; Con: Matt Burke (2)

Jade Stadium, Christchurch
Attendance: 36,000
Referee: Jonathan Kaplan (South Africa)

11 May 2002

Otago Highlanders (New Zealand)	40–26	(Australia) Queensland Reds

Carisbrook, Dunedin
Attendance: 26,100

11 May 2002

Coastal Sharks (South Africa)	38–11	(South Africa) Golden Cats

Kings Park Stadium, Durban
Attendance: 29,517

11 May 2002

Stormers (South Africa)	31–27	(South Africa) Northern Bulls

Newlands Stadium, Cape Town
Attendance: 30,000

== Finals ==
=== Semi finals ===
18 May 2002

Crusaders (New Zealand)	34–23	(New Zealand) Highlanders
Try: Mark Robinson (2); Richie McCaw; Con: Andrew Mehrtens (2); Pen: Andrew Mehrtens (3); Drop: Andrew Mehrtens; Aaron Mauger		Try: Jeff Wilson; Willie Walker; Con: Willie Walker (2); Pen: Willie Walker (3)

Jade Stadium, Christchurch
Referee: Stuart Dickinson (Australia)

18 May 2002

Waratahs (Australia)	10–51	(Australia) ACT Brumbies
Try: Scott Staniforth; Con: Matt Burke; Pen: Matthew Burke		Try: Graeme Bond; Jeremy Paul; Justin Harrison; Owen Finegan; Pat Howard; Con: Julian Huxley (5); Stirling Mortlock; Pen: Julian Huxley (2); Andrew Walker

Aussie Stadium, Sydney
Attendance: 36,146
Referee: Paddy O'Brien (New Zealand)

=== Grand final ===
25 May 2002

Crusaders (New Zealand)	31–13	(Australia) ACT Brumbies
Try: Vunibaka; Ralph (2); Con: Mehrtens (2); Pen: Mehrtens (3); Drop: Mehrtens		Try: Walker; Con: Walker; Pen: Walker (2)

Jade Stadium, Christchurch
Referee: Andre Watson (South Africa)

Crusaders	Brumbies

15	Leon MacDonald
14	Marika Vunibaka
13	Mark Robinson
12	Aaron Mauger
11	Caleb Ralph
10	Andrew Mehrtens
9	Justin Marshall
8	Scott Robertson
7	Richie McCaw
6	Chris Jack
5	Norm Maxwell
4	Reuben Thorne (c)
3	Greg Feek
2	Mark Hammett
1	Greg Somerville
Replacements:
16	David Hewett
17	Corey Flynn
18	Sam Broomhall
19	Johnny Leo'o
20	Ben Hurst
21	Daryl Gibson
22	Ben Blair
Coach:
(New Zealand) Robbie Deans

15	Mark Bartholomeusz
14	Graeme Bond
13	Stirling Mortlock
12	Pat Howard
11	Andrew Walker
10	Stephen Larkham
9	George Gregan (c)
8	Scott Fava
7	George Smith
6	Owen Finegan
5	Justin Harrison
4	Daniel Vickerman
3	Ben Darwin
2	Jeremy Paul
1	Bill Young
Replacements:
16	Damian Flynn
17	Angus Scott
18	David Pusey
19	Peter Ryan
20	Travis Hall
21	Joel Wilson
22	Julian Huxley
Coach:
(Australia) David Nucifora
