= 2001 Super 12 season =

Men's rugby union club competition

2001 Super 12
- Countries: Australia; South Africa; New Zealand
- Tournament format(s): Round-robin and knockout
- Champions: (Australia) ACT Brumbies (1st title)
- Matches played: 69
- Top point scorer(s): (South Africa) Louis Koen (157) (Golden Cats)
- Top try scorer(s): (Australia) Andrew Walker (8) (ACT Brumbies) (Fiji) Aisea Tuilevu (8) (Otago Highlanders)

The 2001 Super 12 season was the sixth season of the Super 12, an annual rugby union competition contested by teams from Australia, New Zealand and South Africa. The season ran from February to May 2001, with each team playing all the others once. At the end of the regular season, the top four teams entered the playoff semi finals, with the first placed team playing the fourth and the second placed team playing the third. The winner of each semi final qualified for the final, which was contested by the ACT Brumbies and the Coastal Sharks at Bruce Stadium, Canberra. The ACT Brumbies won 36–6 to win their first Super 12 title, and became the first Super Rugby champions from outside New Zealand. It was the first year where a New Zealand team failed to make the playoffs.

== Table ==
Key to colours
Top four teams advance to playoffs

Pos	Team	Pld	W	D	L	PF	PA	PD	BP	Pts
1	(Australia) Brumbies	11	8	0	3	348	204	+144	8	40
2	(South Africa) Sharks	11	8	0	3	322	246	+76	6	38
3	(South Africa) Cats	11	7	0	4	285	244	+41	6	34
4	(Australia) Reds	11	6	0	5	300	277	+33	8	32
5	(New Zealand) Highlanders	11	6	0	5	284	295	−11	5	29
6	(New Zealand) Chiefs	11	6	0	5	301	330	−29	4	28
7	(South Africa) Stormers	11	5	0	6	278	285	−7	6	26
8	(Australia) Waratahs	11	5	0	6	306	302	+4	5	25
9	(New Zealand) Hurricanes	11	5	0	6	291	316	−25	5	25
10	(New Zealand) Crusaders	11	4	0	7	307	331	−55	7	23
11	(New Zealand) Blues	11	4	0	7	243	298	−55	4	20
12	(South Africa) Bulls	11	2	0	9	241	378	−137	3	11

== Results ==
=== Round 1 ===
23 February 2001

Coastal Sharks (South Africa)	30–17	(South Africa) Northern Bulls

Kings Park Stadium, Durban

23 February 2001

ACT Brumbies (Australia)	51–16	(New Zealand) Canterbury Crusaders

Canberra Stadium, Canberra

23 February 2001

Otago Highlanders (New Zealand)	23–8	(New Zealand) Auckland Blues

Carisbrook, Dunedin

24 February 2001

Stormers (South Africa)	24–29	(South Africa) Golden Cats

Newlands Stadium, Cape Town
Attendance: 46,544

24 February 2001

Queensland Reds (Australia)	27–18	(New Zealand) Wellington Hurricanes

Ballymore Stadium, Brisbane
Attendance: 20,000

24 February 2001

NSW Waratahs (Australia)	42–23	(New Zealand) Waikato Chiefs

Sydney Football Stadium, Sydney

=== Round 2 ===
2 March 2001

Auckland Blues (New Zealand)	17–12	(New Zealand) Canterbury Crusaders
Try: Mils Muliaina, Matua Parkinson; Con: Carlos Spencer (2); Pen: Carlos Spencer		Pen: Aaron Mauger, Ben Blair(3)

Eden Park, Auckland
Attendance: 30,000
Referee: Paul Honiss (New Zealand)

3 March 2001

Wellington Hurricanes (New Zealand)	26–20	(South Africa) Northern Bulls

Westpac Stadium, Wellington
Attendance: 29,848

3 March 2001

Waikato Chiefs (New Zealand)	32–29	(Australia) Queensland Reds

Rotorua International Stadium, Rotorua
Attendance: 12,000

3 March 2001

Coastal Sharks (South Africa)	17–16	(Australia) ACT Brumbies

Kings Park Stadium, Durban
Attendance: 32,000

3 March 2001

Golden Cats (South Africa)	56–21	(New Zealand) Otago Highlanders

Ellis Park, Johannesburg
Attendance: 26,000

4 March 2001

NSW Waratahs (Australia)	35–7	(South Africa) Stormers

Sydney Football Stadium, Sydney
Attendance: 20,755

=== Round 3 ===
9 March 2001

Wellington Hurricanes (New Zealand)	15–27	(South Africa) Stormers

Westpac Stadium, Wellington
Attendance: 31,682

10 March 2001

Canterbury Crusaders (New Zealand)	40–11	(New Zealand) Waikato Chiefs

Jade Stadium, Christchurch
Attendance: 18,000

10 March 2001

NSW Waratahs (Australia)	53–7	(South Africa) Northern Bulls

Sydney Football Stadium, Sydney
Attendance: 23,019

10 March 2001

Golden Cats (South Africa)	17–19	(Australia) ACT Brumbies

Ellis Park, Johannesburg
Attendance: 40,000

10 March 2001

Coastal Sharks (South Africa)	30–29	(New Zealand) Otago Highlanders

Kings Park Stadium, Durban
Attendance: 33,500

11 March 2001

Auckland Blues (New Zealand)	39–35	(Australia) Queensland Reds

North Harbour Stadium, Auckland
Attendance: 20,000

=== Round 4 ===
16 March 2001

Waikato Chiefs (New Zealand)	34–16	(New Zealand) Auckland Blues

Rotorua International Stadium, Rotorua
Attendance: 14,000

17 March 2001

ACT Brumbies (Australia)	39–30	(South Africa) Northern Bulls

Canberra Stadium, Canberra
Attendance: 15,900

17 March 2001

Golden Cats (South Africa)	28–21	(Australia) NSW Waratahs

Ellis Park, Johannesburg
Attendance: 32,000

17 March 2001

Coastal Sharks (South Africa)	39–21	(New Zealand) Wellington Hurricanes

Kings Park Stadium, Durban
Attendance: 34,090

18 March 2001

Otago Highlanders (New Zealand)	24–23	(South Africa) Stormers

Carisbrook, Dunedin
Attendance: 12,000

=== Round 5 ===
23 March 2001

Golden Cats (South Africa)	18–15	(New Zealand) Wellington Hurricanes

Free State Stadium, Bloemfontein
Attendance: 10,000

23 March 2001

Canterbury Crusaders (New Zealand)	32–26	(Australia) Queensland Reds

Jade Stadium, Christchurch
Attendance: 18,500

24 March 2001

Otago Highlanders (New Zealand)	32–10	(South Africa) Northern Bulls

Carisbrook, Dunedin
Attendance: 11,400

24 March 2001

ACT Brumbies (Australia)	40–25	(South Africa) Stormers

Canberra Stadium, Canberra
Attendance: 15,534

24 March 2001

Coastal Sharks (South Africa)	42–17	(Australia) NSW Waratahs

Kings Park Stadium, Durban
Attendance: 51,344

=== Round 6 ===
30 March 2001

Golden Cats (South Africa)	26–25	(South Africa) Coastal Sharks

Free State Stadium, Bloemfontein
Attendance: 35,000

30 March 2001

Queensland Reds (Australia)	15–23	(Australia) ACT Brumbies

Ballymore Stadium, Brisbane
Attendance: 17,796

30 March 2001

Waikato Chiefs (New Zealand)	50–19	(New Zealand) Otago Highlanders

Rotorua International Stadium, Rotorua
Attendance: 21,476

31 March 2001

NSW Waratahs (Australia)	35–19	(New Zealand) Auckland Blues

Sydney Football Stadium, Sydney
Attendance: 30,893

31 March 2001

Canterbury Crusaders (New Zealand)	29–41	(New Zealand) Wellington Hurricanes

Jade Stadium, Christchurch
Attendance: 20,000

=== Round 7 ===
6 April 2001

Wellington Hurricanes (New Zealand)	34–19	(Australia) ACT Brumbies

Westpac Stadium, Wellington
Attendance: 34,500

7 April 2001

Stormers (South Africa)	29–27	(Australia) Queensland Reds

Outeniqua Park, George
Attendance: 11,000

7 April 2001

Otago Highlanders (New Zealand)	39–20	(Australia) NSW Waratahs

Carisbrook, Dunedin
Attendance: 11,000

7 April 2001

Auckland Blues (New Zealand)	27–41	(South Africa) Coastal Sharks

Eden Park, Auckland
Attendance: 18,000

8 April 2001

Northern Bulls (South Africa)	29–42	(New Zealand) Canterbury Crusaders

Loftus Versfeld, Pretoria
Attendance: 16,000

8 April 2001

Waikato Chiefs (New Zealand)	22–18	(South Africa) Golden Cats

Tauranga Domain, Tauranga
Attendance: 9,000

=== Round 8 ===
13 April 2001

Auckland Blues (New Zealand)	23–26	(South Africa) Golden Cats

Okara Park, Whangārei

13 April 2001

ACT Brumbies (Australia)	48–21	(Australia) NSW Waratahs

Canberra Stadium, Canberra

14 April 2001

Wellington Hurricanes (New Zealand)	35–33	(New Zealand) Otago Highlanders

McLean Park, Napier

14 April 2001

Waikato Chiefs (New Zealand)	8–24	(South Africa) Coastal Sharks

Owen Delany Park, Taupō

14 April 2001

Northern Bulls (South Africa)	19–29	(Australia) Queensland Reds

Loftus Versfeld, Pretoria

14 April 2001

Stormers (South Africa)	49–28	(New Zealand) Canterbury Crusaders

Newlands Stadium, Cape Town

=== Round 9 ===
20 April 2001

Otago Highlanders (New Zealand)	16–9	(Australia) ACT Brumbies

Carisbrook, Dunedin

21 April 2001

Northern Bulls (South Africa)	37–49	(New Zealand) Waikato Chiefs

Loftus Versfeld, Pretoria

21 April 2001

Stormers (South Africa)	12–26	(New Zealand) Auckland Blues

Newlands Stadium, Cape Town

22 April 2001

Queensland Reds (Australia)	32–27	(South Africa) Coastal Sharks

Ballymore Stadium, Brisbane

22 April 2001

Canterbury Crusaders (New Zealand)	31–32	(South Africa) Golden Cats

Trafalgar Park, Nelson

=== Round 10 ===
27 April 2001

Wellington Hurricanes (New Zealand)	42–17	(Australia) NSW Waratahs

Yarrow Stadium, New Plymouth

27 April 2001

Stormers (South Africa)	29–15	(New Zealand) Waikato Chiefs

Newlands Stadium, Cape Town

28 April 2001

Canterbury Crusaders (New Zealand)	34–24	(South Africa) Coastal Sharks

Jade Stadium, Christchurch

28 April 2001

Queensland Reds (Australia)	22–16	(South Africa) Golden Cats

Ballymore Stadium, Brisbane

28 April 2001

Northern Bulls (South Africa)	28–25	(New Zealand) Auckland Blues

Loftus Versfeld, Pretoria

=== Round 11 ===
4 May 2001

Wellington Hurricanes (New Zealand)	27–51	(New Zealand) Waikato Chiefs

Westpac Stadium, Wellington
Attendance: 34,500

5 May 2001

Auckland Blues (New Zealand)	7–35	(Australia) ACT Brumbies

Eden Park, Auckland

5 May 2001

Northern Bulls (South Africa)	23–34	(South Africa) Stormers

Loftus Versfeld, Pretoria

5 May 2001

Queensland Reds (Australia)	33–22	(New Zealand) Otago Highlanders

Ballymore Stadium, Brisbane

5 May 2001

NSW Waratahs (Australia)	25–22	(New Zealand) Canterbury Crusaders

Sydney Football Stadium, Sydney

=== Round 12 ===
11 May 2001

Auckland Blues (New Zealand)	36–17	(New Zealand) Wellington Hurricanes

Eden Park, Auckland

11 May 2001

ACT Brumbies (Australia)	49–6	(New Zealand) Waikato Chiefs

Canberra Stadium, Canberra

11 May 2001

Golden Cats (South Africa)	19–21	(South Africa) Northern Bulls

Ellis Park, Johannesburg

12 May 2001

Otago Highlanders (New Zealand)	26–21	(New Zealand) Canterbury Crusaders

Carisbrook, Dunedin

12 May 2001

NSW Waratahs (Australia)	20–25	(Australia) Queensland Reds

Sydney Football Stadium, Sydney

12 May 2001

Stormers (South Africa)	19–23	(South Africa) Coastal Sharks

Newlands Stadium, Cape Town

== Finals ==
=== Semi finals ===
19 May 2001

Coastal Sharks (South Africa)	30–12	(South Africa) Golden Cats

Kings Park Stadium, Durban
Attendance: 52,750

19 May 2001

ACT Brumbies (Australia)	30–6	(Australia) Queensland Reds

Bruce Stadium, Canberra
Attendance: 25,273

=== Grand final ===
26 May 2001

ACT Brumbies	36–6	Coastal Sharks
Try: Roff (2), Giffin; Con: Walker (3); Pen: Walker (5)		Pen: James (2)

Bruce Stadium, Canberra
Attendance: 26,271
Referee: Paddy O'Brien (New Zealand)

Brumbies	Sharks

FB	15	Andrew Walker
RW	14	Graeme Bond
OC	13	James Holbeck
IC	12	Rod Kafer
LW	11	Joe Roff
FH	10	Stephen Larkham
SH	9	George Gregan(c)
N8	8	Jim Williams
OF	7	George Smith
BF	6	Peter Ryan
RL	5	David Giffin
LL	4	Justin Harrison
TP	3	Ben Darwin
HK	2	Jeremy Paul
LP	1	Bill Young
Substitutes:
HK	16	Tom Murphy
PR	17	Matt Weaver
FL	18	David Pusey
FL	19	Radike Samo
FH	20	Travis Hall
CE	21	Craig McMullen
CE	22	Mark Bartholomeusz
Coach:
(Australia) Eddie Jones

FB	15	Ricardo Loubscher
RW	14	Stefan Terblanche
OC	13	Deon Kayser
IC	12	Trevor Halstead
LW	11	Justin Swart
FH	10	Butch James
SH	9	Craig Davidson
N8	8	AJ Venter
OF	7	Charl van Rensburg
BF	6	Warren Britz
RL	5	Mark Andrews (c)
LL	4	Albert van den Berg
TP	3	Etienne Fynn
HK	2	John Smit
LP	1	Ollie le Roux
Substitutions:
HK	16	Lukas Van Biljon
PR	17	Brent Moyle
LK	18	Shaun Sowerby
N8	19	Brad McLeod-Henderson
SH	20	Hentie Martens
FH	21	Gaffie du Toit
CE	22	André Snyman
Coach:
(South Africa) Rudolf Straeuli

== Top scorers ==
- Points: Louis Koen 157 (Cats)
- Tries: Andrew Walker 8 (Brumbies), Aisea Tuilevu 8 (Highlanders)
