= 2001 Australia rugby union tour of Europe =

Summary
P	W	D	L
Total
7	5	0	2
Test match
4	2	0	2
Opponent
P	W	D	L
Spain
1	1	0	0
England
1	0	0	1
France
1	0	0	1
Wales
1	1	0	0

The 2001 Wallabies Spring tour was a series of matches played in October and November 2001 in Europe by Australia national rugby union team.

The tour was originally to include a test match in Canada, but this was cancelled due a strike by the Canadian players over the sacking of the national coach, David Clark. So two fixtures were added against an England Divisions XV and Oxford University.

== Results ==
'Scores and results list Australia's points tally first.

Opposing Team	For	Against	Date	Venue	Status
English Nat. Division	34	22	28 October 2001	Welford Road, Leicester	Tour match
Spain	92	10	1 November 2001	Madrid	Test match
Oxford University	52	27	4 November 2001	Iffley Road, Oxford	Tour match
England	15	21	10 November 2001	Twickenham, London	Test match
France	13	14	17 November 2001	Vélodrome, Marseille	Test match
Wales	21	13	25 November 2001	Millennium, Cardiff	Test match
Barbarians	49	35	28 November 2001	Millennium, Cardiff	Tour match

== Touring party ==
- Head Coach: Eddie Jones

The 30-man touring squad announced in September was:

Forwards:

- Nick Stiles
- Bill Young
- Ben Darwin
- Rod Moore
- Michael Foley
- Brendan Cannon
- David Giffin
- Justin Harrison
- Mark Connors
- Tom Bowman
- Owen Finegan
- Matt Cockbain
- George Smith
- Phil Waugh
- Toutai Kefu
- David Lyons

Backs:

- George Gregan (captain)
- Chris Whitaker
- Stephen Larkham
- Elton Flatley
- Manuel Edmonds
- Nathan Grey
- Daniel Herbert
- Steve Kefu
- Graeme Bond
- Andrew Walker
- Ben Tune
- Joe Roff
- Matthew Burke
- Chris Latham
