= André Watson =

South African rugby union referee

- Born: André Jacobus Watson; 24 April 1958 (age 68) Germiston, South Africa
- School: Maria van Riebeeck Primary; Goudrif High School
- University: Stellenbosch University; University of the Witwatersrand
- Occupation: Civil engineer

Rugby union career
- Position: Fly-half
Amateur team(s)
| Years | Team | Apps | (Points) |
- Stellenbosch University
| – | University of the Witwatersrand | | |
Provincial / State sides
| Years | Team | Apps | (Points) |
- Transvaal Schools XV
Refereeing career
| Years | Competition | | Apps |
| 2004 | Currie Cup | | 100 |
- Super Rugby
| 1996–2004 | Tests | | 28 |

André Jacobus Watson (born 24 April 1958) is a South African former rugby union referee. He officiated a record number of finals in the Rugby World Cup (two), the Currie Cup (seven) and Super Rugby (five).

== Biography ==
Watson was born in Germiston, Transvaal, and attended school at Maria van Riebeeck Primary and Goudrif High School. He later attended Stellenbosch University and the University of the Witwatersrand before working as an engineer.

== Playing career ==
As a youth Watson played representative rugby for Transvaal Schools XV. While studying at university he played for Stellenbosch University and the University of the Witwatersrand.

== Refereeing career ==
He took up refereeing in 1987, becoming a full-time referee in 1995.

=== Provincial rugby ===
During his career he refereed 100 Currie Cup matches including seven cup finals which, as of 2010, is the most by a referee.

Watson refereed five Super Rugby finals which is, as of 2011, a record.

He refereed his last super rugby game in 2004 which was the final, and asked Mark Bartholomeusz for his jersey.

=== International rugby ===
He made his international debut in 1996 in a match between Australia and Canada. Watson refereed the first of two Rugby World Cup finals when he took charge of the 1999 Rugby World Cup final between Australia and France in Cardiff.

His second World Cup final was the 2003 Rugby World Cup final between Australia and England in Sydney. He remains the only male referee to have officiated in two finals, as Hollie Davidson has since refereed two Women's Rugby World Cup finals. However, he has been criticised for his officiating in the 2003 final, favouring the hosts, Australia, in his decision-making.

He announced his retirement prior to the July 2004 match between Australia and the Pacific Islanders. He made a comeback three months later, refereeing the first match of the qualification round for 2007 Rugby World Cup between Andorra and Norway.

== Post-refereeing career ==
He was appointed as the Manager of Referees for the South African Rugby Union in 2011. On 3 July 2015, SARU announced that his employment has been terminated after the Commission for Conciliation, Mediation and Arbitration decided that a number of grievances lodged against Watson proved to be valid.

| Preceded by 1995 (England) Ed Morrison | Rugby World Cup final referee 1999, 2003 (South Africa) André Watson | Succeeded by 2007 (Ireland) Alain Rolland |
| Preceded by 1998 (New Zealand) Paddy O'Brien | Super Rugby final referee 1999, 2000 (South Africa) André Watson | Succeeded by 2001 (New Zealand) Paddy O'Brien |
| Preceded by 2001 (New Zealand) Paddy O'Brien | Super Rugby final referee 2002, 2003, 2003 (South Africa) André Watson | Succeeded by 2004 (South Africa) Jonathan Kaplan |
| Preceded by 1995 Tappe Henning | Currie Cup final referee 1996, 1997, 1998, 1999, 2000, 2001; André Watson | Succeeded by 2002 Jonathan Kaplan |
| Preceded by 2003 Shaun Veldsman | Currie Cup final referee 2004; André Watson | Succeeded by 2005 Jonathan Kaplan |
