= List of Super Rugby referees =

This is a list of rugby union referees who have officiated in Super Rugby. The list includes any referee that has officiated in a regular season match, semi-final or final in Super Rugby, ordered by debut date and name. Assistant referees and television match officials are not included in this list.

== Referees ==
Name	Matches	Debut	Last
Paddy O'Brien (New Zealand)	51	1 March 1996	19 March 2005
Scott Young (Australia)	45	1 March 1996	5 May 2006
Tappe Henning (South Africa)	48	2 March 1996	13 May 2006
Colin Hawke (New Zealand)	30	3 March 1996	22 April 2001
Glenn Wahlstrom (New Zealand)	14	3 March 1996	9 April 1999
Wayne Erickson (Australia)	35	5 March 1996	20 April 2002
Stuart Dickinson (Australia)	98	9 March 1996	11 June 2011
Ian Rogers (South Africa)	11	9 March 1996	24 April 1998
Steve Walsh Snr. (New Zealand)	22	9 March 1996	11 March 2000
André Watson (South Africa)	49	9 March 1996	22 May 2004
Michael Keogh (Australia)	3	10 March 1996	12 April 1997
Barry Leask (Australia)	2	15 March 1996	14 March 1997
Marius Franken (South Africa)	3	16 March 1996	2 May 1998
Stef Neethling (South Africa)	4	16 March 1996	4 May 1996
Andrew Cole (Australia)	44	24 March 1996	20 May 2005
Peter Marshall (Australia)	34	29 March 1996	16 May 2003
Alan Riley (New Zealand)	1	30 March 1996	30 March 1996
Rodney Hill (New Zealand)	1	3 April 1996	3 April 1996
Carl Spannenberg (South Africa)	10	27 April 1996	11 May 2001
Johan Meuwesen (South Africa)	9	10 May 1996	23 April 1999
Jonathan Kaplan (South Africa)	105	2 March 1997	25 May 2013
Paul Honiss (New Zealand)	49	16 March 1997	27 April 2007
Andy Turner (Australia)	14	22 March 1997	3 April 2004
Steve Walsh (New Zealand)	113	3 May 1997	28 February 2015
Paul Macfie (New Zealand)	2	6 March 1999	3 April 1999
Mark Lawrence (South Africa)	75	13 March 1999	30 June 2012
Kelvin Deaker (New Zealand)	41	10 March 2000	25 April 2008
George Ayoub (Australia)	18	6 May 2000	29 April 2006
Lyndon Bray (New Zealand)	30	23 March 2002	10 May 2008
Eugene Daniels (South Africa)	4	30 March 2002	10 May 2003
Matt Goddard (Australia)	35	4 May 2002	9 May 2009
Michael Katzenellenbogen (South Africa)	5	11 May 2002	27 March 2004
Shaun Veldsman (South Africa)	7	28 February 2004	14 May 2005
Craig Joubert (South Africa)	102	25 February 2005	23 July 2016
Bryce Lawrence (New Zealand)	60	5 March 2005	30 June 2012
Brett Bowden (Australia)	14	30 April 2005	12 April 2008
Marius Jonker (South Africa)	51	7 May 2005	7 July 2012
Chris Pollock (New Zealand)	78	17 February 2006	9 July 2016
JC Fortuin (South Africa)	11	25 February 2006	7 March 2008
Paul Marks (Australia)	23	11 March 2006	15 May 2010
James Leckie (Australia)	26	29 April 2006	14 March 2014
Willie Roos (South Africa)	8	6 May 2006	10 May 2008
Nathan Pearce (Australia)	9	10 February 2007	14 May 2011
Ian Smith (New Zealand)	17	11 April 2008	30 June 2012
Phillip Bosch (South Africa)	3	17 May 2008	2 May 2009
Keith Brown (New Zealand)	30	17 May 2008	7 July 2012
Vinny Munro (New Zealand)	12	20 February 2009	13 May 2011
Jaco Peyper (South Africa)	116	8 May 2009	7 November 2020
Garratt Williamson (New Zealand)	32	16 May 2009	27 June 2014
Pro Legoete (South Africa)	5	27 February 2010	21 May 2011
Jonathon White (New Zealand)	19	20 March 2010	5 July 2013
Glen Jackson (New Zealand)	88	27 May 2011	26 June 2019
Angus Gardner (Australia)	143	10 March 2012	12 June 2026
Mike Fraser (New Zealand)	81	31 March 2012	28 May 2022
Andrew Lees (Australia)	29	4 May 2012	1 July 2016
Stuart Berry (South Africa)	27	5 May 2012	9 July 2016
Francisco Pastrana (Argentina)	7	7 July 2012	22 March 2014
Lourens van der Merwe (South Africa)	11	14 July 2012	22 March 2014
Rohan Hoffmann (Australia)	35	1 March 2013	3 June 2017
Jason Jaftha (South Africa)	6	2 March 2013	6 July 2013
Nick Briant (New Zealand)	58	9 March 2013	8 June 2019
Marius van der Westhuizen (South Africa)	53	5 April 2013	14 November 2020
Matt O'Brien (Australia)	6	12 April 2013	30 May 2015
Ben O'Keeffe (New Zealand)	122	21 February 2015	13 June 2026
Jaco van Heerden (South Africa)	18	4 April 2015	1 July 2017
Paul Williams (New Zealand)	85	4 March 2016	23 May 2026
Quinton Immelman (South Africa)	8	12 March 2016	8 July 2017
Will Houston (Australia)	11	19 March 2016	24 March 2018
Brendon Pickerill (New Zealand)	60	25 March 2016	8 March 2024
Rasta Rasivhenge (South Africa)	30	2 April 2016	7 November 2020
Nic Berry (Australia)	113	8 April 2016	20 June 2026
Jamie Nutbrown (New Zealand)	13	8 April 2016	27 April 2018
Shuhei Kubo (Japan)	10	9 April 2016	23 March 2018
Federico Anselmi (Argentina)	24	7 May 2016	6 March 2020
Egon Seconds (South Africa)	13	25 February 2017	11 May 2019
AJ Jacobs (South Africa)	17	23 February 2019	21 November 2020
Damon Murphy (Australia)	55	8 March 2019	9 May 2026
James Doleman (New Zealand)	64	7 March 2020	6 June 2026
Graham Cooper (Australia)	21	7 August 2020	27 April 2024
Jordan Way (Australia)	38	21 August 2020	30 May 2026
Amy Perrett (Australia)	3	28 August 2020	17 April 2021
Cwengile Jadezweni (South Africa)	2	16 October 2020	6 November 2020
Griffin Colby (South Africa)	1	13 November 2020	13 November 2020
Aimee Barrett-Theron (South Africa)	1	21 November 2020	21 November 2020
Reuben Keane (Australia)	13	26 February 2022	23 May 2026
Dan Waenga (New Zealand)	7	12 April 2022	3 May 2024
Angus Mabey (New Zealand)	20	16 April 2022	9 May 2026
Marcus Playle (New Zealand)	9	8 March 2025	30 May 2026
Todd Petrie (New Zealand)	4	23 May 2025	26 April 2026
