= Angus Scott =

Angus Scott may refer to:

- Angus Scott (athlete) (1927–1990), British sprinter
- Angus Scott (politician) (1876–1958), chairman of London County Council
- Angus Scott (rugby union) (born 1978), Australian rugby union player

== See also ==
- Angus, Scotland
- Angus Scott-Young (born 1997), Australian rugby union player
