= Tom Murphy (rugby union) =

- Full name: Thomas Desmond Murphy
- Born: 25 April 1972 (age 54) Longreach, QLD, Australia
- Height: 5 ft 11 in (180 cm)
- Weight: 215 lb (98 kg)
- University: University of Queensland; University of Cambridge

Rugby union career
- Position: Hooker
Super Rugby
Years	Team	Apps	(Points)
2000–01	Brumbies	14	(0)
2002	Reds	11	(0)

Thomas Desmond Murphy (born 25 April 1972) is an Australian former professional rugby union player.

Born in Longreach, Queensland, Murphy was a hooker and played rugby in England during the 1990s. He won two Cambridge blues, captaining the university to victory in the 1997 Varsity match, and spent a season with Harlequins.

Murphy linked up with the ACT Brumbies on his return to Australia in 2000 and was an understudy to Jeremy Paul for two seasons. Following the retirement of Reds hooker Michael Foley, Murphy took the opportunity to return to Queensland and fight for the vacant position, but was forced to retire himself within one season due to a neck injury.
