= Etienne Fynn =

South Africa professional rugby union football coach

- Born: 14 December 1972 (age 53) South Africa
- Height: 1.76 m (5 ft 9 1/2 in)
- Weight: 120 kg (18 st 13 lb; 265 lb)

Rugby union career
Senior career
Years	Team	Apps	(Points)
1999–2003	Sharks	14	(5)
International career
Years	Team	Apps	(Points)
2001	South Africa	2	(0)
Coaching career
- Years: Team
- 2010–2022: Sharks (Currie Cup)
- 2022–: Sharks (Currie Cup)

Etienne Fynn is a South African professional rugby union football coach and former player. He is currently the head coach of the Sharks side that participates in the Currie Cup. He had previously spent the past decade coaching within the Sharks system. Fynn had previously played as a prop for the Sharks and Sharks, while also winning two caps for South Africa.
