= Greg Feek =

NZ international rugby union player

- Full name: Gregory Edward Feek
- Born: 20 July 1975 (age 51) New Plymouth, New Zealand
- Height: 185 cm (6 ft 1 in)
- Weight: 112 kg (247 lb; 17 st 9 lb)
- School: New Plymouth Boys' High School

Rugby union career
- Position: Prop
Senior career
| Years | Team | Apps | (Points) |
| 1996–1998 | Taranaki | 27 | (5) |
| 1998–2005 | Crusaders | 64 | (25) |
| 1999–2005 | Canterbury | 39 | (10) |
| 2004 | Blues | 2 | (0) |
| 2006 | Tasman | 5 | (0) |
- Correct as of 24 May 2020
International career
| Years | Team | Apps | (Points) |
| 1995–1996 | New Zealand U21 | 6 | (0) |
| 1998–2006 | New Zealand Māori | 18 | (10) |
| 1999–2001 | New Zealand | 10 | (0) |
| 2004 | Barbarian F.C. | 2 | (0) |
- Correct as of 24 May 2020
Coaching career
- Years: Team
- 2008–2009: Hurricanes (assistant)
- 2010–2014: Leinster (assistant)
- 2014–2019: Ireland (assistant)
- 2018–2020: NEC Green Rockets (assistant)
- 2020: South Island
- 2020–: New Zealand (assistant)
- Correct as of 24 May 2020

Gregory Edward Feek (born 20 July 1975) is a New Zealand rugby union former player who now works as a rugby coach. He played 10 tests for the All Blacks between 1999 and 2001 as a prop, in addition to 63 appearances with the Crusaders.

Feek was born in New Plymouth. He played provincial rugby for Taranaki between 1996 and 1998 and Canterbury between 1999 and 2005. He also played for New Zealand Maori in 2006. He since retired from playing rugby.

In 2008, Feek was the forwards coach for the Wellington Hurricanes in Super Rugby. Feek joined Leinster as scrum coach for the 2010/2011 season. He also worked as Ireland scrum coach, a position he left after the 2019 World Cup.

== Personal life ==
Feek is a New Zealander of Māori descent (Ngāti Kahungunu descent).
