= Angus Scott (rugby union) =

Australian rugby player

- Born: 11 April 1978 (age 48)

Rugby union career
- Position: Prop
Super Rugby
Years	Team	Apps	(Points)
2000–02	Brumbies	12	(0)
2004	Reds	9	(0)
2006–07	Western Force	16	(0)

Angus Scott (born 11 April 1978) is an Australian former professional rugby union player.

Scott grew up on a farm in the New South Wales town of Cootamundra.

A loosehead prop, Scott was signed by the ACT Brumbies as an understudy to Ben Darwin and received limited opportunities in the Eddie Jones-coached team. He moved on to the Queensland Reds, making nine appearances, then joined his third Super 12 franchise, signing a two-year contract with the Western Force in 2005 to play in their inaugural season. His time in Perth was marred by heel injuries and he was forced to retire in 2008 at the age 29.
