= Marika Vunibaka =

Fijian rugby union player

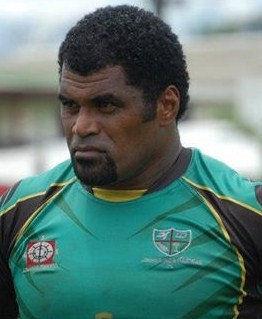
- Vunibaka in 2013
- Born: 3 November 1974 (age 52) Levuka, Lomaiviti, Fiji
- Height: 187 cm (6 ft 2 in)
- Weight: 98 kg (15 st 6 lb; 216 lb)
- School: Marist Brothers High School
- Occupation: Professional rugby union player

Rugby union career
- Position: Wing
Amateur team(s)
Years	Team	Apps	(Points)
2015–16	Leeton Phantoms		
Senior career
Years	Team	Apps	(Points)
1997	Leicester Tigers	1	(0)
Provincial / State sides
Years	Team	Apps	(Points)
2000–04	Canterbury	28	(60(12t))
- Correct as of 15 July 2013
Super Rugby
Years	Team	Apps	(Points)
2000–04	Crusaders	50	(175(35t))
International career
Years	Team	Apps	(Points)
1999–03	Fiji	17	(40(8t))
- Correct as of 15 July 2013
National sevens team
Years	Team		Comps
1997–08	Fiji 7s		
Coaching career
- Years: Team
- 2017: Leeton Phantoms RFC
Medal record
Men's rugby sevens
Representing Fiji
Commonwealth Games
Silver medal – second place	1998 Kuala Lumpur	Team competition

Marika "Dawainavesi" Vunibaka (born 3 November 1974) is a Fijian former rugby union player. He represented the Fiji national team on numerous occasions, including at the 1999 Rugby World Cup in Wales and the 2003 Rugby World Cup in Australia.

Vunibaka represented Fiji at rugby sevens level from 1997 to 2008 and is one of the few sevens players to play in three Rugby World Cup Sevens, 1997, 2001 and 2005. Fiji won the World Cup in both 1997 and 2005, and he was the top try scorer in the 1997 World Cup.

== Rugby fifteens ==
Vunibaka joined Leicester on trial in 1997, he scored a hat trick of three tries on his only first team appearance against Loughborough Students, he was the first Leicester player to score a hat trick on debut since 1935. He was unable to secure a UK work permit so could not play in competitive fixtures and therefore left the club.

Vunibaka played for the New Zealand team the Crusaders in the international Super 12 competition and Canterbury in the N.P.C. He scored 35 tries out of the 50 Matches for Crusaders. He is still the 2nd fastest player in Super rugby to reach 25 tries after scoring his 25th try in his 30th game for the crusaders, 2 matches behind Joe Roff.

Vunibaka made his Test debut for Fiji in a match against Canada in Vancouver. He was then included in the Fijian squad for the 1999 Rugby World Cup in Wales, where he scored a try in the pool match against Canada. He was included in their 2003 Rugby World Cup squad, and scored a try in the win over Japan.

== Coaching ==
Vunibaka after playing 2 seasons (2015–2016) with the Leeton Phantoms in Southern Inland NSW he took over as head coach in 2017. Vunibaka lead the club to the Club Championship and 1st Grade to an undefeated home and away season and their first grand final appearance since 1998 where the Leeton Phantoms held on to win 30–29 over Wagga Wagga Waratahs for the club's second 1st Grade Premiership and first since 1991.
