= Stuart Dickinson =

Australian former Rugby union referee

- Born: 19 July 1968 (age 58)

Rugby union career
Refereeing career
Years	Competition	Apps
1999–2007	Rugby World Cup	
1997–2010	Test Matches	
–	Super Rugby	
–	Tri Nations	
–	Six Nations	

Stuart Dickinson (born 19 July 1968) is an Australian former Rugby union referee. Dickinson has refereed in many rugby competitions, including the Rugby World Cup, Tri Nations, Six Nations, international friendlies, Super 12/14/15, and Shute Shield. He was a referee at the 1999 Rugby World Cup, the 2003 Rugby World Cup, and the 2007 Rugby World Cup. He is Australia's most-capped referee, and the only Australian referee to appear at three Rugby World Cups.

== Referee career ==
Dickinson commenced refereeing at the age of 12 while also playing fly-half and fullback for Epping Boys' High School. He was employed full-time with the Australian Rugby Union (ARU) from 1996 to 2011. Prior to 1996, he worked as a site manager for Linfox, a transport company as well as with the New South Wales Police Force.

He made his international refereeing debut in 1997 in a Rugby World Cup qualifier between Tahiti and Papua New Guinea. He refereed his first international match between two Tier 1 nations a year later for the 1998 international between Wales and South Africa at Wembley.

Dickinson refereed several pool games in the 2007 Rugby World Cup, including Fiji's upset of Wales. Shortly after the 2007 World Cup, Dickinson authored a book entitled "The Rugby World Cup Diaries – A referee's inside view."

Dickinson was publicly criticised by IRB referees manager Paddy O'Brien for his refereeing of the scrums in the Italy v New Zealand test match at the San Siro Stadium in Milan on 14 November 2009. O'Brien stated that Dickinson had got it "completely wrong", believing the Italian tight-head prop, Martin Castrogiovanni was boring in on his opposite. This led to outrage by the Australian Rugby Union, who issued a formal complaint to the IRB against Paddy O'Brien. O'Brien ended up apologising to Stuart Dickinson and the Australian Rugby Union: "I have unreservedly apologised to Stuart Dickinson for the action of publicly discussing elements of his performance review and would like to extend that apology to the Australian Rugby Union," said O'Brien.

== Retirement ==
In 2010 despite being rated in the Top 3 SANZAR Referees (after being appointed to the Super Rugby semi-final in Soweto) he was overlooked for the 6 Nations tournament for the first time since 2000. Then in 2011 Dickinson was overlooked for the Rugby World Cup. O'Brien denied there was any vendetta against Dickinson. Dickinson subsequently announced his retirement from refereeing on 27 September 2011.

== Test Match Honour Roll ==
At the Townsville District Rugby Union Referees Dinner on 2 October 2009, Dickinson confirmed (at that time) he had refereed 43 international matches in total. 41 of those matches are listed below.

- 1997 Papua New Guinea v Tahiti (French Polynesia)
- 1997 Tonga v Cook Islands
- 1998 Canada v Argentina
- 1998 Hong Kong v South Korea
- 1998 Wales v South Africa
- 1999 New Zealand v France
- 1999 Scotland v Uruguay (World Cup)
- 1999 Argentina v Japan (World Cup)
- 1999 Ireland v Argentina (World Cup)
- 2000 France v England
- 2000 South Africa v England
- 2000 Wales v Samoa
- 2001 France v Scotland
- 2001 England v Italy
- 2001 New Zealand Maoris v Argentina
- 2001 England v South Africa
- 2002 Japan v South Korea
- 2002 Chinese Taipei v South Korea
- 2002 Fiji v Tonga
- 2002 New Zealand v South Africa
- 2002 Wales v Fiji
- 2003 New Zealand v England
- 2003 Scotland v Japan (World Cup)
- 2003 South Africa v Georgia (Georgia (country)) (World Cup)
- 2004 Wales v France
- 2004 New Zealand v Pacific Islanders
- 2005 British and Irish Lions v Argentina
- 2005 England v Barbarians
- 2005 Wales v South Africa
- 2006 Ireland v Scotland
- 2006 New Zealand v Ireland
- 2006 South Africa v France
- 2006 France v New Zealand
- 2007 New Zealand v France
- 2007 New Zealand v South Africa
- 2007 (United States) USA v Tonga (World Cup)
- 2007 Argentina v Namibia (World Cup)
- 2007 Wales v Fiji (World Cup)
- 2008 Ireland v England
- 2008 New Zealand v South Africa
- 2008 New Zealand v Samoa
- 2008 Wales v Canada
- 2009 England v France
- 2009 South Africa v British and Irish Lions
- 2009 Italy v New Zealand
- 2010 Argentina v France
- 2011 New Zealand vs Fiji

== 2010 Super 14 season ==
- Round 1, 12 February 2010: Hurricanes 34 – 20 Blues
- Round 7, 26 March 2010: Highlanders 39 – 29 Lions
- Round 8, 2 April 2010: Western Force 16 – 15 Stormers
- Round 9, 10 April 2010: Blues 21 – 33 Stormers
- Round 12, 30 April 2010: Stormers 42 – 14 Crusaders
- Round 13, 8 May 2010: Sharks 20 – 14 Stormers
- Semi-Final, 22 May 2010: Bulls 39 – 24 Crusaders
