= Kelvin Deaker =

- Born: 19 October 1965 (age 61)
- Occupation: Accountant

Rugby union career
Refereeing career
Years	Competition	Apps
2001-	Test Matches	23
2000-	Super Rugby	41
1996	Air NZ Cup	72
–	Heartland Championship	19

Kelvin Deaker (born 19 October 1965) is a former New Zealand rugby union international referee and member of the Hawke's Bay Rugby Union, who has now retired from all refereeing. Deaker took up refereeing in 1991, and refereed his first representative match in 1996, when he took charge of a National Provincial Championship Division 3 match between Buller and Horowhenua. In 2001, the year he turned professional, Deaker refereed his first international rugby match, taking charge of the match between Wales and Japan on 17 June 2001. Two years later, Deaker was named as one of the referees who were to take charge of matches at the 2003 Rugby World Cup, and was subsequently named as a touch judge for the 2007 Rugby World Cup in France. Off the field, Deaker is a qualified chartered accountant, currently works for TRS , in the town of Blenheim, New Zealand.

== Career stats ==
- National Referee Squad debut – 1996
- Rebel Sport Super Rugby debut – 2000
- Test debut - 2001
- Total First Class Fixtures - 178 matches
- Test Fixtures - 23 tests
- Rebel Sport Super Rugby Fixtures - 41
- Air New Zealand Cup/NPC - 72 matches
- AA Rewards Heartland Championship - 19 matches
