= Graeme Bond (rugby union) =

- Full name: Graeme Stephen Geoffrey Bond
- Born: 21 May 1974 (age 52) Duke of York Island, PNG
- Height: 5 ft 11 in (180 cm)
- Weight: 210 lb (95 kg)

Rugby union career
- Position: Centre / Wing
Senior career
Years	Team	Apps	(Points)
1997–98	NSW Waratahs		
1999–02	ACT Brumbies		
2002–04	Sale Sharks		
International career
Years	Team	Apps	(Points)
2001	Australia	5	(5)

Graeme Stephen Geoffrey Bond (born 21 May 1974) is an Australian former professional rugby union player for the NSW Waratahs, ACT Brumbies and Sale Sharks. He represented Australia in five Test matches as a centre and winger.

Bond was born in Papua New Guinea and attended Brisbane's Marist College. He won a Super 12 title with the ACT Brumbies in 2001 and debuted for the Wallabies that year against the Springboks in Perth. On the 2001 Wallabies tour of Europe, he featured in a further four Test matches and scored his only international try in a win over Spain. He played for the Sale Sharks from 2002 to 2004, before being forced into retirement due to a neck injury.

== See also ==
- List of Australia national rugby union players
