= David Giffin =

- Born: 6 November 1973 (age 53) Brisbane, Australia
- Height: 6 ft 6 in (1.98 m)
- Weight: 242 lb (110 kg)

Rugby union career
- Position: Lock
Super Rugby
Years	Team	Apps	(Points)
?	Reds	3	
1996-2004	Brumbies	81	
International career
Years	Team	Apps	(Points)
1996-2003	Australia	50	(0)

David Giffin (born 6 November 1973) is a former vice-captain of the Wallabies in rugby union, where he played in the lock position. Queensland-born, he played most of his professional career with the ACT Brumbies in what was then the Super 12. At that level, he earned 81 caps – earning a further 49 at international level. At the height of his game he was considered to be the leading exponent of lineouts in world rugby. Giffin was a member of the Wallabies 1999 Rugby World Cup-winning squad, where he started in the final. He was also a part of the 2003 Rugby World Cup final where the Wallabies finished runner-up.

Giffin attended Redeemer Lutheran College during his secondary education in Brisbane and remains close to the rugby union community there, having often spoken to the 1st XV at the outset of their seasons. From school Giffin moved to the Sunnybank Rugby Union Club where he was elevated to A Grade at the end of his second Colts season.

After three games with the Queensland Reds he joined the Brumbies for their inaugural season in 1996. He played for the Brumbies between 1996 and 2004, and despite residing in Sydney is considered a Canberra local. He was awarded the keys to the city following scoring the winning try in the 2001 Super 12 final.
