= Mark Bartholomeusz =

Australia international rugby union player

- Born: Mark Andrew Bartholomeusz; 30 June 1977 (age 49) Brisbane, Australia
- Height: 1.78 m (5 ft 10 in)
- Weight: 90 kg (200 lb)

Rugby union career
- Position: Utility Back
Senior career
Years	Team	Apps	(Points)
2004–06	Saracens	40	(26)
2006–08	Ulster	34	(10)
2008–09	Padova	15	(10)
Provincial / State sides
Years	Team	Apps	(Points)
1998-2003	ACT	66	(115)
Super Rugby
Years	Team	Apps	(Points)
1998–2004	Brumbies	67	(100)
2010–11	Western Force	10	(5)
International career
Years	Team	Apps	(Points)
2002	Australia	1	(0)
National sevens team
Years	Team		Comps
2002	Australia		Commonwealth Games 2002

Mark Bartholomeusz (born 30 June 1977) is a retired Australian professional rugby union footballer. He played in the positions of fullback, flyhalf, inside centre, outside centre and wing.

== Career ==
Bartholomeusz started his rugby career at Sunnybank in Queensland, being a Brisbane local. He then moved to Souths Rugby as a teenager.

Bartholomeusz attended Brisbane State High School. He played in the 1st XV for three years. He was also a talented cricketer. He played for the ACT Brumbies and was a member of the side that defeated the Sharks in 2001 and the Crusaders in 2004 to win Super 12 titles.

Bartholomeusz represented Australia at Under 21’s level as well as representing Australia in Rugby Sevens at the 2002 Commonwealth Games.

Bartholomeusz played for the Brumbies side against the British and Irish Lions in 2001 and scored a try in that game, as well as for the winning Australia A side earlier in the tour in Gosford.

He joined Saracens where he played the 2004–05 and 2005–06 seasons in the English Premiership, followed by Irish Magners League club Ulster for 2006–07 and 2007–08. In 2008, Bartholomeusz signed with Padova to play in the Italian Super 10 (now Top12) for the 2008/09 season. He returned to Australia to play for the Western Force in 2010 and 2011.

Bartholomeusz held the record for having the fourth-shortest international rugby union career. In 2002, he represented Australia for 2 minutes and 33 seconds against Italy. Nic Henderson (Australia), Sean McCahill (Ireland) and Mathieu Dourthe (France) were the only players to have shorter international careers at that time.Nic Henderson, one of Bartholomeusz’s ACT Brumbies teammates represented Australia twice more.
