= Andrew Walker (rugby) =

Australia international rugby union & rugby league footballer

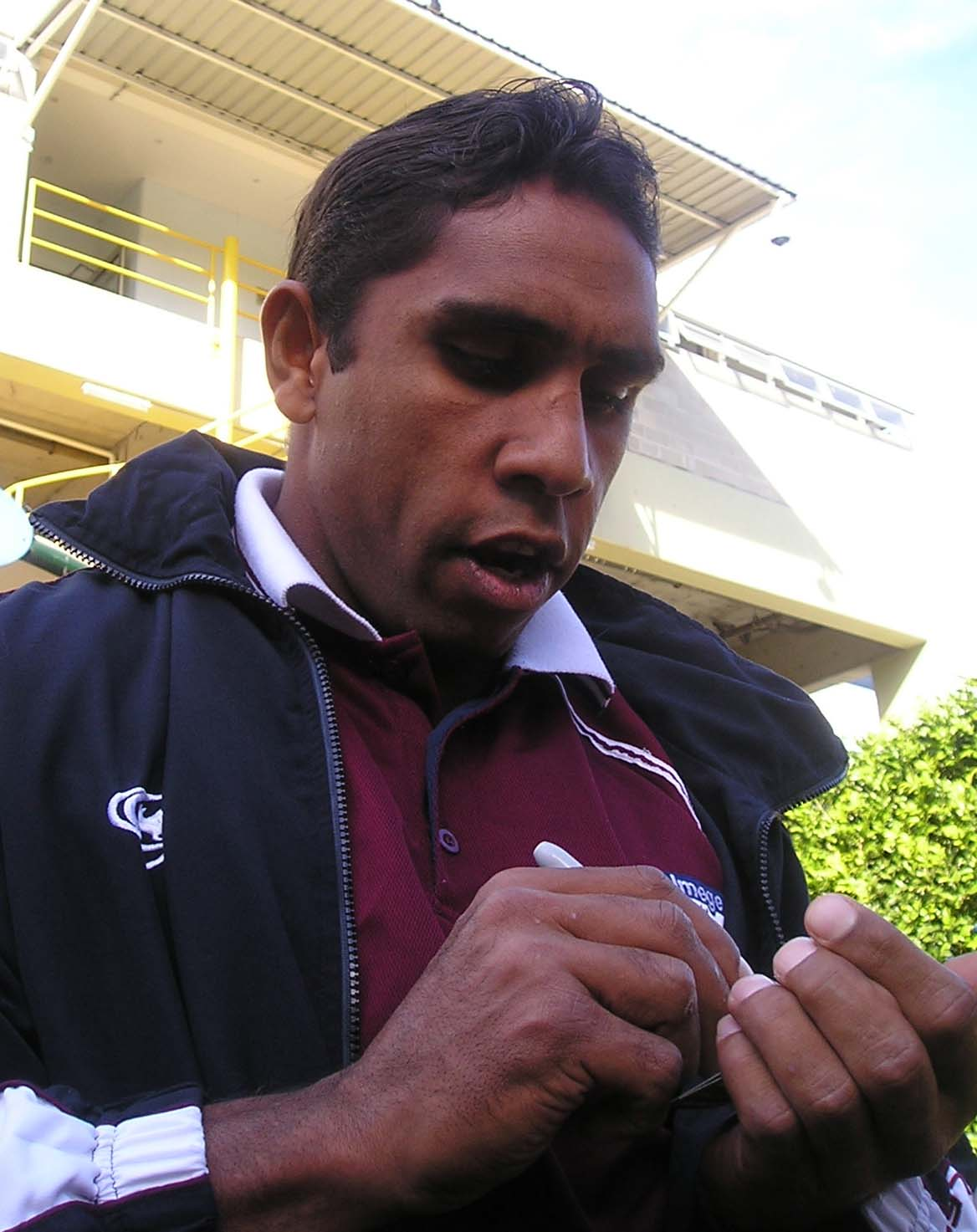
- Walker in 2004

Personal information
- Born: 22 November 1973 (age 52) Shoalhaven, New South Wales, Australia

Playing information
- Height: 177 cm (5 ft 10 in)
- Weight: 87 kg (13 st 10 lb)

Rugby league
- Position: Five-eighth / Fullback
Club
Years	Team	Pld	T	G	FG	P
1992–94	St. George Dragons	18	6	0	2	26
1995–99	Sydney City Roosters	103	46	102	6	394
2004	Manly Sea Eagles	24	5	80	0	180
	Total	145	57	182	8	600
Representative
Years	Team	Pld	T	G	FG	P
1996	Australia	1	0	0	0	0

Rugby union
- Position: Wing / Fullback
Club
Years	Team	Pld	T	G	FG	P
2000–03	ACT Brumbies	26	31	35	0	244
2006–07	Gaillac RFC	17	2	16	0	55
2007–08	East Coast Aces	4	2	7	0	26
2007–08	Queensland Reds	10	1	7	0	22
	Total	57	36	65	0	347
Representative
Years	Team	Pld	T	G	FG	P
2000–01	Australia	7	1	2	0	11

Andrew Walker (born 22 November 1973) is an indigenous Australian former professional rugby footballer who represented his country in both rugby league and rugby union - a dual code international. Walker was the first dual code international to represent his country at rugby league before representing rugby union.

== Background ==
Walker was born in Shoalhaven, New South Wales, Australia.

== Career ==
Hailing from Nowra, Walker began his career as a rugby union footballer for Shoalhaven Rugby club as a junior, before moving to Randwick DRUFC, where he played alongside Eddie Jones in their 1991 premiership-winning season. He changed rugby football codes from rugby union to rugby league he transferred to NSWRL Premiership club St. George Dragons the following season.

Walker played for several NRL clubs including the St George Dragons, Sydney Roosters and the Manly-Warringah Sea Eagles. In 1996, he played in one match for the Kangaroos against a Papua New Guinean side. He is known as the first dual-international to switch codes from league to union; 2 years before the more publicised exodus of Wendell Sailor and Mat Rogers.

"One of my all-time favourite players was Andrew Walker. Andrew was a tremendously talented individual who could do almost anything on a football field; except stick to a structure."

— −Phil Gould

Walker's provincial rugby was with the ACT Brumbies. He is remembered among Brumbies fans for scoring thirteen tries in the 2000 season, which included two hat-tricks. Walker became Australia's 40th dual code international when he made his Australia début against New Zealand during July 2000 following Scott Gourley and preceding Wendell Sailor and Mat Rogers. However his debut was not a memorable one as he came off the bench for the last 10 minutes of the game at Stadium Australia in front of a world-record crowd and proceeded to miss a conversion, kick straight down the throat of Christian Cullen and then, after the resulting New Zealand try to Jonah Lomu to win them the game 39–35, he failed to send the kick-off 10 metres and New Zealand received the ball.

Walker changed rugby football codes from rugby union to rugby league after his Australia career ended following disciplinary difficulties, but he was subsequently banned for two years in 2004 following cocaine use when playing for the Manly-Warringah Sea Eagles.

In 2006 he resurrected his career by signing to play with French rugby union club UA Gaillac. During December 2006 Walker began renegotiations with Queensland Reds' coach Eddie Jones (who had previously coached him with the Brumbies) to play in the 2007 Super fourteen season . In early March, Walker was named on the bench of the Queensland Reds team and played the last 15 minutes in their Week 5 defeat by the Lions. This came just hours after he was released from UA Gaillac and signed by the Queensland Reds until his retirement on 26 July 2008.

On 26 July 2008, Andrew Walker announced his retirement from representative rugby union. At the time he was playing for the Easts Tigers Rugby Union in the Queensland Premier Rugby competition, where he won the Hospital Cup and the Australian Club Championship. 35 Years old at the time, Walker retired, stating fatigue and a need to spend more time with his family who supported him through his successful but troubled career.

However, in early January 2010, Andrew Walker signed a minor contract with the Goodna Eagles rugby league football club, who are based in Ipswich, Queensland, becoming the biggest signing in Ipswich Rugby League history.

In 2019, he played one game for Randwick DRUFC against Argentina.
