= Justin Harrison =

Australia international rugby union player

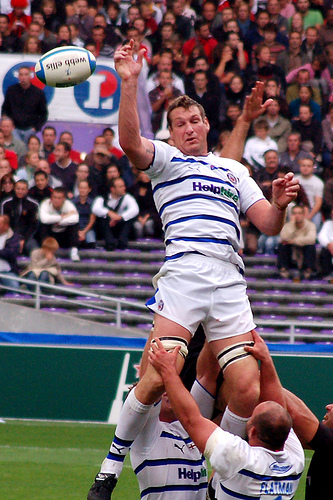
- Born: 20 April 1974 (age 52) Sydney, Australia
- Height: 2.01 m (6 ft 7 in)
- Weight: 113 kg (17 st 11 lb)
- University: Southern Cross University, Lismore; 1997–2001 University of Canberra

Rugby union career
- Position: Lock
- Current team: Brumbies (forwards coach)
Senior career
Years	Team	Apps	(Points)
2005–2008	Ulster Rugby	72	(10)
2008–2009	Bath Rugby	30	(0)
2011–2013	RC Narbonne	20	(0)
- Correct as of 29 March 2021
Super Rugby
Years	Team	Apps	(Points)
1997–2004	Brumbies	43	(5)
2004–2005	Waratahs	21	(0)
2010	Brumbies	5	(0)
International career
Years	Team	Apps	(Points)
2001–2004	Australia	34	(5)

Justin Harrison (born 20 April 1974) is an Australian rugby union commentator and former international rugby union player, who played lock forward and is currently the head of the Australian Rugby Union Players Association (RUPA).

== Playing career ==
He moved to the Tuggeranong Vikings Rugby Union Club in Canberra, he made the 1994 Australian Capital Territory (ACT) Under-21s and then the Australian Universities team. The following year, he played in the Australian U21s team and made his debut for the ACT against New South Wales B. He made his Super 12 debut with the Brumbies in 1997.

He made his international debut as Australia took on the British and Irish Lions in the third and final test of the 2001 series; at the time Harrison was a student studying for a Bachelor of Applied Science in Sports Administration at the University of Canberra from which he graduated in 2001.

A veteran of the 2003 Rugby World Cup, Harrison joined the New South Wales Waratahs at the beginning of 2004 for two seasons before moving to the northern hemisphere to play for Ulster.

As of 23 May 2006, Harrison had played 25 games for Ulster, 19 of those in the Celtic League and 6 in the Heineken Cup. Harrison proved an effective player in the Celtic League, a consistent winner of line-out possession and aggressive in rucks and mauls. Although regarded as inspiring by other Ulster players, his tendency to indulge in sledging led to confrontation with a number of opposing players and a number of off the pitch incidents.

At the end of the 2008 season, Harrison moved to Bath Rugby until his retirement after involvement with the cocaine scandal and a bar fight with Harlequins players at Bath at the end of the 2008/09 season. He was suspended from playing and coaching rugby for six months.

On 30 November 2009, it was announced that Justin Harrison would return to play for the Brumbies in 2010 on a one-year deal, as coverage for Peter Kimlin. However, the ARU has not endorsed this contract.

== Post-playing career ==
Harrison was Head Coach of Racing Club Narbonne Méditerranée in France.

In July 2010, it was announced that Harrison would become forwards coach at Brumbies, agreeing a two-year deal with the club.

== Personal life ==
Harrison completed a Bachelor of Applied Science in Sports Administration at the University of Canberra in 2001.
