= Bill Young (rugby union) =

Australian former rugby union footballer (born 1974)

Bill Young (born 4 March 1974, in Sydney, New South Wales) is an Australian former professional rugby union footballer. He played rugby for the Brumbies in the international Super Rugby competition and played for Australia over 40 times.

== Early life ==
Young was educated at St Joseph's College, Hunters Hill and played in that school's first XV.

== Rugby career ==
Standing at 1.88m and weighing in at 115 kg during his playing days, Young was a loosehead prop.

Young represented Australia in the under-21s in 1995. He made his Super 12 debut for the Brumbies in a match against the Wellington Hurricanes in a home match in Canberra in mid-season 1998. He scored his first Super Rugby try in the 2000 season, against New South Wales team, the Waratahs. That same year Young made his debut for the Wallabies in a test against France in Paris.

The following season he played in 12 matches for the Brumbies, scoring two tries. The Brumbies made it to the semi-finals. The following year however he played nine tests for the Wallabies that year. Young was part of the Australian 2003 Rugby World Cup team that made it to the final in Sydney, though the Wallabies were defeated by the English in the final.

In 2004 Young scored five tries in the season, and the Brumbies defeated the Crusaders in the final. The following season he celebrated his 100th Super Rugby match against the Crusaders at Jade Stadium. Young announced his retirement from rugby on 18 July 2006 to prevent further trouble with a chronic neck injury. In total he was capped 46 times for Australia and played 100 matches for the ACT Brumbies. He retired as the second most capped Wallaby prop of all time. He is a person that owns 4 pubs, Young has 4 children.

== Business career ==
Young's parents had owned and operated the Friend in Hand Hotel in Sydney's Glebe during the 1980s when Young was a boy. Young himself owned the Friend in Hand from 2020 to 2022 and on-sold it to effect the 2022 purchase of Chippendale's Bar Broadway for $37M in August 2022.

Young was reported in August 2022 to own, through his family interests, six Sydney hotels - the Concord Hotel, a suburban pub in Concord West; The Palace Hotel in Mortlake; the Illinois Hotel and the Five Dock Hotel, both in Five Dock; Royal Hotel, in Ryde; and Bar Broadway in Chippendale (previously a Tooth and Co pub known as Sutherlands Hotel). In October 2026, it was announced that Young had acquired The Epping Hotel in Epping for $50 million.

== Published sources ==
- Howell, Max (2006) Born to Lead - Wallaby Test Captains (2005) Celebrity Books, New Zealand
