= Jeremy Paul (rugby union) =

Australia international rugby union player

- Born: Jeremy Paul; 14 March 1977 (age 49) Hamilton, New Zealand
- Height: 186 cm (6 ft 1 in)
- Weight: 102 kg (16 st 1 lb)
- School: Capalaba

Rugby union career
- Position(s): Hooker, Prop
Senior career
Years	Team	Apps	(Points)
1998–2007	Brumbies	112	(115)
2007–08	Gloucester	6	(0)
International career
Years	Team	Apps	(Points)
1998- 2006	Australia	72	(70)
- Correct as of 12 Sept 2006
National sevens team
Years	Team		Comps
- Australia

Jeremy Paul (born 14 March 1977) is a former professional rugby union player. He played hooker for the Wallabies and the ACT Brumbies.

Jeremy Paul was born in New Zealand but grew up in the Redland Shire of South East Queensland. He was selected from Easts Tigers in Brisbane to represent the ACT Brumbies on a tour to the UK. Following a successful tour, he picked up a full time contract with the ACT Brumbies.

At the end of 2005, Paul was awarded the John Eales Medal, receiving 194 votes from his teammates. He ruptured a tendon during the Wallabies 24-16 Tri-Nations' loss to South Africa in September 2006 and underwent surgery, and was forced to miss the European tour.

He has won 72 caps for Australia and 112 Super Rugby caps for the ACT Brumbies.

In May 2007 Paul signed with Gloucester Rugby for the start of the 2007/08 season but, for contractual reasons, he was not able to join the squad until after the 2007 Rugby World Cup. He made his Gloucester Rugby debut on 27 October 2007 in the Anglo-Welsh EDF Energy Cup against Newcastle Falcons.

He now works in finance.

Preceded by David Lyons	John Eales Medal; 2005	Succeeded by Chris Latham
