= Paddy O'Brien (rugby union) =

NZ rugby union referee

Paddy O'Brien ONZM
- Born: Patric Denis O'Brien; 19 July 1959 (age 67) Southland, New Zealand

Rugby union career
- Position(s): Fullback, Wing
Provincial / State sides
Years	Team	Apps	(Points)
- Southland U-18
-	Southland B		
Refereeing career
Years	Competition		Apps
- Rugby World Cup
1996	Super Rugby		
–	Test Matches		27
–	Six Nations		
–	Lions Tour		

Patric Denis O'Brien ONZM (born 19 July 1959), commonly known as Paddy O'Brien, is a New Zealand international rugby union referee, and former head of the International Rugby Board's Referee Board.

He was born in Southland, New Zealand. He played his rugby as a full back and wing for Southland at Under 18 and B level, as well as Sevens, between 1976 and 1984.

== Refereeing career ==
O'Brien began refereeing with the Southland Referees Association in 1984 and combined that with 17 years in the New Zealand Police before turning professional in 1996 with his first game in the Super 12. He took charge of his first test match on 23 October 1994 with the Rugby World Cup qualifier between Hong Kong and South Korea in Kuala Lumpur, which Korea won 28–17. He also officiated matches of the British and Irish Lions, including the deciding third test on their 2001 tour to Australia. He became New Zealand's most capped test official on 29 March 2003 when he officiated the Six Nations encounter between France and Wales in Paris for his 27th test, taking him past Dave Bishop's record.

In the 2005 Queen's Birthday Honours, O'Brien was appointed an Officer of the New Zealand Order of Merit, for services to rugby as a referee.

== IRB administration ==
In 2007, O'Brien, in his capacity as Rugby World Cup Chief of Officials, defended criticism of the refereeing of Wayne Barnes in the France versus New Zealand quarterfinal. Commenting on death threats made against Barnes he said "I think it's a disgrace and people have to grow up." He also accused the coach of the United States team, Peter Thorburn, of lying when Thorburn stated that there had been a pre-tournament directive that touch judges should not interfere in issues like forward passes. O'Brien later apologised to Thorburn.

In November 2009, O'Brien publicly apologised to New Zealand with regards to the refereeing performance of Stuart Dickinson during an international match against Italy. He subsequently issued a public apology to both Dickinson and the Australian Rugby Union for his breach of IRB protocol in making his comments public rather than going through official channels for commenting on referee performance.

During the 2011 Rugby World Cup O'Brien publicly defended referee Alain Rolland's decision to issue Wales Captain Sam Warburton a straight red card during their semi final match against France stating "Alain Rolland's decision to issue a red card was absolutely correct in law and in keeping with the clear instructions that match officials have received in recent years regarding dangerous tackling."

In May 2012 he was released as head of the Referee Board and substituted by a commission of four members

== Political career ==
O'Brien was elected to the Invercargill Licensing Trust (ILT) in 2016 and re-elected in 2019, topping the poll both times. He was speculated as a potential candidate in the 2019 Invercargill mayoral election but decided against it while not ruling out the possibility of a future mayoral run.

Following the resignation of deputy mayor Toni Biddle from the Invercargill City Council, O'Brien announced his intent to contest the resulting by-election. On 3 December he pulled out of the race.

In 2022, he was re-elected to the ILT, topping the poll once again. He was subsequently appointed president, replacing the retiring Alan Dennis.
