= Rugby Union Players' Association =

Australian professional union

RUPA
- Rugby Union Players' Association
- Founded: 1995
- Headquarters: Mallet Street, Sydney
- Location: Australia
- Key people: Adrian Turner (Chief Executive Officer)
- Website: rupa.com.au

The Rugby Union Players' Association (RUPA) is the representative body for professional rugby union players in Australia. It was formed in October 1995 in response to the professionalism of rugby.

As soon as a player signs a Rugby contract in Australia they are offered the chance to become a RUPA member regardless of nationality. As of September 2025, all of Australia's professional and semi-professional Rugby players were RUPA members, including male and female professionals across Rugby Sevens and 15-a-side Rugby, totalling approximately 400 players.

RUPA also provides support services for all past (retired) professional Australian Rugby players.

== Members ==
Its members comprise the following:

- Players on the Australia national rugby union team (the Wallabies & the Wallaroos)
- Players for the country's four Super Rugby and Super W sides: the NSW Waratahs, Queensland Reds, ACT Brumbies, and the Western Force
- Players from Australia's Men's and Women's Rugby Sevens squads
- All past professional players in Australia since 1996

== History ==
In August 1995, the ARU, NSWRU, QRU and the ACTRU agreed to support the establishment of a players’ association and to loan it $10,000.00 for set up costs and to allow it distribute television revenue. The RUPA was established and the following month, an initial steering committee made of Tony Dempsey, Ewen McKenzie, George Gregan, Damien Smith, Mark Harthill, Tim Kava, Rod McCall and Rod Kafer was formed with Dempsey being elected president in December 1995.

== Objectives ==
RUPA's objectives are:

- Provision of an Association that promotes and advances Rugby in Australia
- Promotion and protection of the interests and safeguarding rights of members
- To secure and maintain freedom from unjust and unlawful rules and regulations affecting member's careers
- Assisting Members in securing employment
- Assisting Members in their study pursuits
- Obtaining member benefits
- To provide legal advice and legal assistance
- Election of Members as directors to the Boards of Directors of the ARU, ACTRU, NSWRU, QRU, VRU and WARU Boards

== Collective Bargaining ==
RUPA engages in collective bargaining on behalf of its members with their employers. There have been six agreements:

=== First Collective Bargaining Agreement ===
In October 1997 RUPA negotiated its first collective bargaining agreement with the ARU, NSWRU, QRU and ACTRU that provided a regulatory framework for the employment of professional rugby players in. Key features of this collective bargaining agreement included:

- A minimum wage for Super 12 players and a standard player contract
- An increase in death and total disability insurance for players
- It established a joint committee on players’ safety and welfare and an 8-week lay off period each year for players
- A career training scheme to provide players with vocational and career skills after rugby was established
- Dispute resolution procedures
- A requirement that rugby bodies pay 25% of player generated revenue to players each year

=== Second Collective Bargaining Agreement ===
A second Collective Bargaining Agreement was implemented in April 2001 that expanded on the 1997 Agreement. Key features of this Agreement included:

- An increase in the players’ share of player generated revenue from 25% to 30%
- An increase in the average salary per player from $120,000 to $138,000 as well as an increase in minimum salary from $28,940 to $45,000
- Revenue sharing in use of players’ signatures on memorabilia and increased protection of players’ images
- Career Training Scheme funding went from $110,000 to $550,000

=== Third Collective Bargaining Agreement ===
A third Collective Bargaining Agreement came into place in December 2004. This agreement addressed issues surrounding player burnout, agent accreditation, occupational health and safety, compulsory tertiary education as well as improvement of the employment conditions for all players.

=== Fourth Collective Bargaining Agreement ===
A fourth Collective Bargaining Agreement came was agreed in October 2013 and remained in place until December 2017.

=== Fifth Collective Bargaining Agreement ===
A fifth Collective Bargaining Agreement came into place in January 2018, running until December 2022.

=== Sixth Collective Bargaining Agreement ===
The sixth Collective Bargaining Agreement, running from January 2023 until November 2026, introduced significant developments including increased funding for women’s rugby through Super W, restored international match payments, improved minimum wages for Super Rugby and Sevens players, expanded career-ending insurance, and enhanced rights relating to player images and commercial rules.

== Awards ==
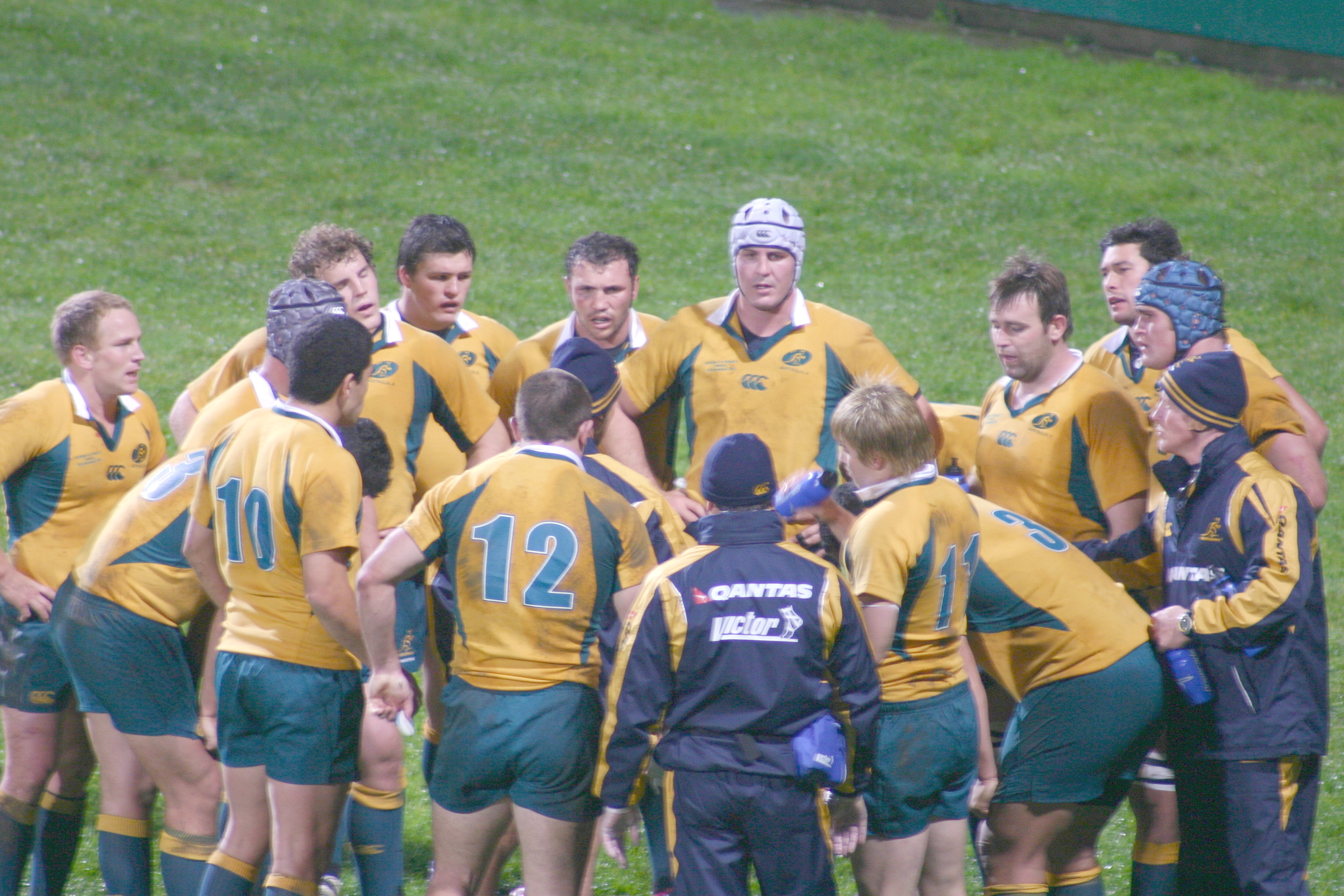
The John Eales Medal is awarded to the best international player each season

=== RUPA Medal for Excellence ===
The RUPA Medal for Excellence is awarded annually to the Australian player who is voted by his peers as having excelled both on and off the field during the season. All full-time professional players who are members of RUPA are eligible to vote. The inaugural winner was George Gregan in 2001. Gregan won the award three times in total, following up 2001 by winning the Medal for Excellence in 2004 and 2006 as well.

Nathan Sharpe has won the Medal for Excellence a record four times (2002, 2005, 2011 and 2012), with George Smith (2007 and 2008) and David Pocock (2010 and 2015) the other multiple recipients.

Year	Winner
2001	George Gregan
2002	Nathan Sharpe
2003	Brendan Cannon
2004	George Gregan
2005	Nathan Sharpe
2006	George Gregan
2007	George Smith
2008	George Smith
2009	Berrick Barnes
2010	David Pocock
2011	Nathan Sharpe
2012	Nathan Sharpe
2013	Nick Cummins
2014	James Slipper
2015	David Pocock
2016	Christin Leali'ifano
2017	Isa Naisarani
2018	David Pocock
2019	Allan Alaalatoa
2022	Allan Alaalatoa
2023	James Slipper
2024	Fraser McReight

=== The John Eales Medal ===
In June 2002 the ARU and RUPA jointly launched an award to honour the game's best Wallaby player each season, named after Wallaby legend John Eales. The John Eales Medal is awarded to the player judged by his peers as the team's outstanding player. The inaugural John Eales Medal was won in 2002 by George Smith who won it again in 2008.

=== Newcomer of the Year ===
First introduced in 2006 when it was won by Berrick Barnes, all five Australian Super Rugby teams have seen at least one of their players receive this prestigious award. The Newcomer of the Year is awarded to any first-year contracted player who has not only excelled in their performances on the field, but has also made significant achievements with their education and support of the community.

Of the first ten recipients of the Award, eight have thus far gone on to represent the Wallabies.

Year	Winner
2006	Berrick Barnes
2007	David Pocock
2008	Ben Lucas
2009	Laurie Weeks
2010	Pat McCabe
2011	Ben Tapuai
2012	Joe Tomane
2013	Israel Folau
2014	Sean McMahon
2015	Sefa Naivalu
2016	Reece Hodge
2017	Marika Koroibete
2018	Folau Fainga'a
2019	Isaac Lucas
2021	Josh Flook
2022	Maddison Levi
2023	Max Jorgensen
2024	Charlie Cale

=== People's Choice Player of the Year ===
Introduced in 2013, the RUPA People's Choice Player of the Year is awarded to the player deemed by members of the public to have best displayed the 'spirit of Rugby' in all their pursuits of a calendar year. The results are formulated from a web-based vote.

The past winners of the award are Israel Folau (2013), Matt Hodgson (2014) and David Pocock (2015).

=== Men's and Women's Rugby Sevens Players' Player of the Year ===
The Men's and Women's Sevens Players' Player are awarded to the male and female sevens players that best embody performance, discipline, leadership and consistency as voted by their peers.

Year	Men's winner	Women's winner
2012	Jesse Parahi	
2013	Con Foley	Emilee Cherry
2014	Cameron Clark	Emilee Cherry
2015	Cameron Clark	Charlotte Caslick
2016	Lewis Holland	Charlotte Caslick
2017	James Stannard	Chloe Dalton
2018	Ben O'Donnell	Evania Pelite
2019	Maurice Longbottom	Ellia Green
2021	Josh Turner	Maddison Ashby
2022	Dietrich Roache	Faith Nathan
2023	Dietrich Roache	Charlotte Caslick
2024	Nick Malouf	Maddison Levi

=== Community Service Award ===
The RUPA Foundation Community Service Award is awarded to acknowledge a contracted player who has not only excelled in their performances on the field, but has also dedicated a significant amount of time and effort to the development of their community and various charitable initiatives.

Year	Winner(s)
2011	David Pocock
2012	Eddie Aholelei
2013	Pat Leafa
2014	Patrick McCutcheon & Henry Speight
2015	Paddy Ryan
2016	Matt Hodgson
2017	Robbie Abel & Matt Sandell
2018	Jed Holloway
2019	Lachlan McCaffrey
2021	Tom Wright
2022	Liam Wright
2023	Sharni Smale
2024	Blake Schoupp

=== Academic Achievement Award ===
Introduced in 2011, the Academic Achievement Award is awarded to any contracted player who has undertaken and excelled in academic pursuits of any level. It is not the 'Dux' of RUPA's members, rather it acknowledges players' dedication and commitment to their personal and professional development across a broad range of studies as is not confined to university level education.

Year	Winner
2011	Matt Hodgson
2012	Pat McCabe
2013	Tom Kingston
2014	Jeremy Tilse
2015	Ben Daley
2016	Alicia Quirk
2017	James Dargaville
2018	Sam Carter
2019	Angus Scott-Young
2021	Ross Haylett-Petty
2022	Michael Wells
2023	Tom Robertson
2024	Andy Muirhead & Ed Kennedy

=== NRC Players' Player ===
A new award introduced in 2014, the NRC Players' Player recognises the player adjudged by his peers to have been the best performer during the Buildcorp NRC competition. Five finalists are selected, and then voted upon by NRC players on a 3–2–1 basis.

The inaugural winner was Brisbane City's Samu Kerevi, with Ita Vaea (UC Vikings) winning the award in 2015.

== Services/Player Development Program ==
=== Player Development Managers ===
The Australian Rugby Union and The Rugby Union Players Association jointly appointed the first National Player Development Manager in July 2001.

Now, there are Player Development Managers employed at every Australian Super Rugby team, and one employed to oversee both the Men's and Women's Rugby Sevens programs.

The role of a Player Development Manager includes providing support in the areas of career and education, career placement program, financial and legal support and personnel counselling for players.

=== Player Services Manager ===
In October 2003 RUPA appointed a Manager of Player Services whose role it is to enhance the overall level of membership benefits including implementation of Player Agent Accreditation Scheme and the development of the Rugby AU/RUPA Player Safety and Welfare Committee.

=== RUPA Induction Camp ===
Since 2001, RUPA has held an annual Induction Camp for all first-year contracted players. The players assemble in Sydney and spend two and a half days in RUPA's care, receiving training and participating in a number of workshops, presentations and activities designed to best prepare them for their first year of professional Rugby in Australia. They are educated about Australian Rugby policies including the code of conduct, and topics such as cultural diversity, cyber security, domestic violence, road safety, overcoming adversity and more.

The Camp is a core component of RUPA's Player Development Program (PDP), which employs five Player Development Managers who each work within the Australian Super Rugby teams. RUPA's PDP is a proactive, player-focused initiative that assists professionally contracted Rugby players from the rookie level through to transition and beyond post retirement. The Program offers support in all areas off the field, including education, professional training, mental health, career and financial matters.

In 2015, the RUPA Induction Camp was held in Coogee, with 31 players from across the country in attendance.

== Membership of other bodies ==
=== International Rugby Players Association ===
RUPA was a founding member of the International Rugby Players’ Association (IRPA). IRPA's members include the Player Associations from England, (RPA), South Africa (SARPA), New Zealand (NZRPA) and France (Provale).

In 2003 they were joined by the Irish and Welsh bodies, IRUPA and WRPA. In 2006, the Scottish players body SRPA also became members. They have been joined in recent years by Pacific Island Players' Association (PIPA), Japan Rugby Players' Association (JRPA) and GIRA (Italy).

Its objectives are to promote, advance and protect the interest and objects of its members and to be the representative voice of all members on issues of importance to the international professional game.
