= Michael Hooper (rugby union) =

Australian rugby union player (born 1991)

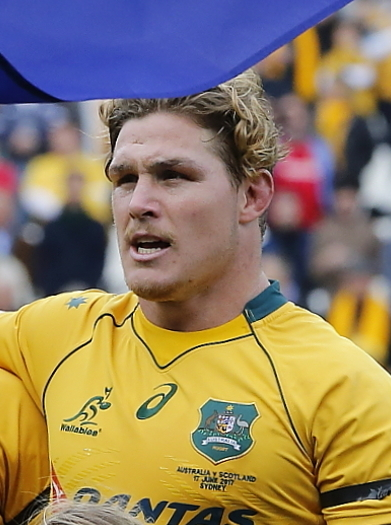
- Hooper representing Australia during the June Test Series, June 2017
- Full name: Michael Kent Hooper
- Born: 29 October 1991 (age 35) Manly, New South Wales, Australia
- Height: 182 cm (6 ft 0 in)
- Weight: 101 kg (223 lb; 15 st 13 lb)
- School: St. Pius X College
- University: Macquarie University

Rugby union career
- Position: Flanker
Amateur team(s)
Years	Team	Apps	(Points)
2013	Manly	1	(20)
- Correct as of 16 July 2016
Senior career
Years	Team	Apps	(Points)
2010–2012	Brumbies	31	(25)
2013–2023	Waratahs	141	(130)
2021	Toyota Verblitz	10	(10)
2025	Toyota Verblitz	8	(5)
- Correct as of 21 June 2026
International career
Years	Team	Apps	(Points)
2011	Australia U20	4	(10)
2012–2023	Australia	125	(110)
- Correct as of 7 April 2024
National sevens team
Years	Team		Comps
2024	Australia		2

Michael Kent Hooper (born 29 October 1991) is an Australian former professional rugby union player who is the former captain of the Australia national team, the Wallabies. His primary position was openside flanker.

Hooper is one of Australia's most-capped players of all time and played for the New South Wales Waratahs in Super Rugby from 2013-2023. He played for the Australian national rugby sevens team in 2024. Hooper had previously represented the Brumbies and Toyota Verblitz in his professional career.

== Early life ==
Hooper was born on 29 October 1991 in Sydney, and played his junior rugby at the Manly Roos like other former Wallabies such as George Smith. Hooper represented Australia under 20 at the 2011 IRB Junior World Championship where he captained the side at times and was named International Player of the Tournament.

== Professional career ==
=== Super Rugby ===
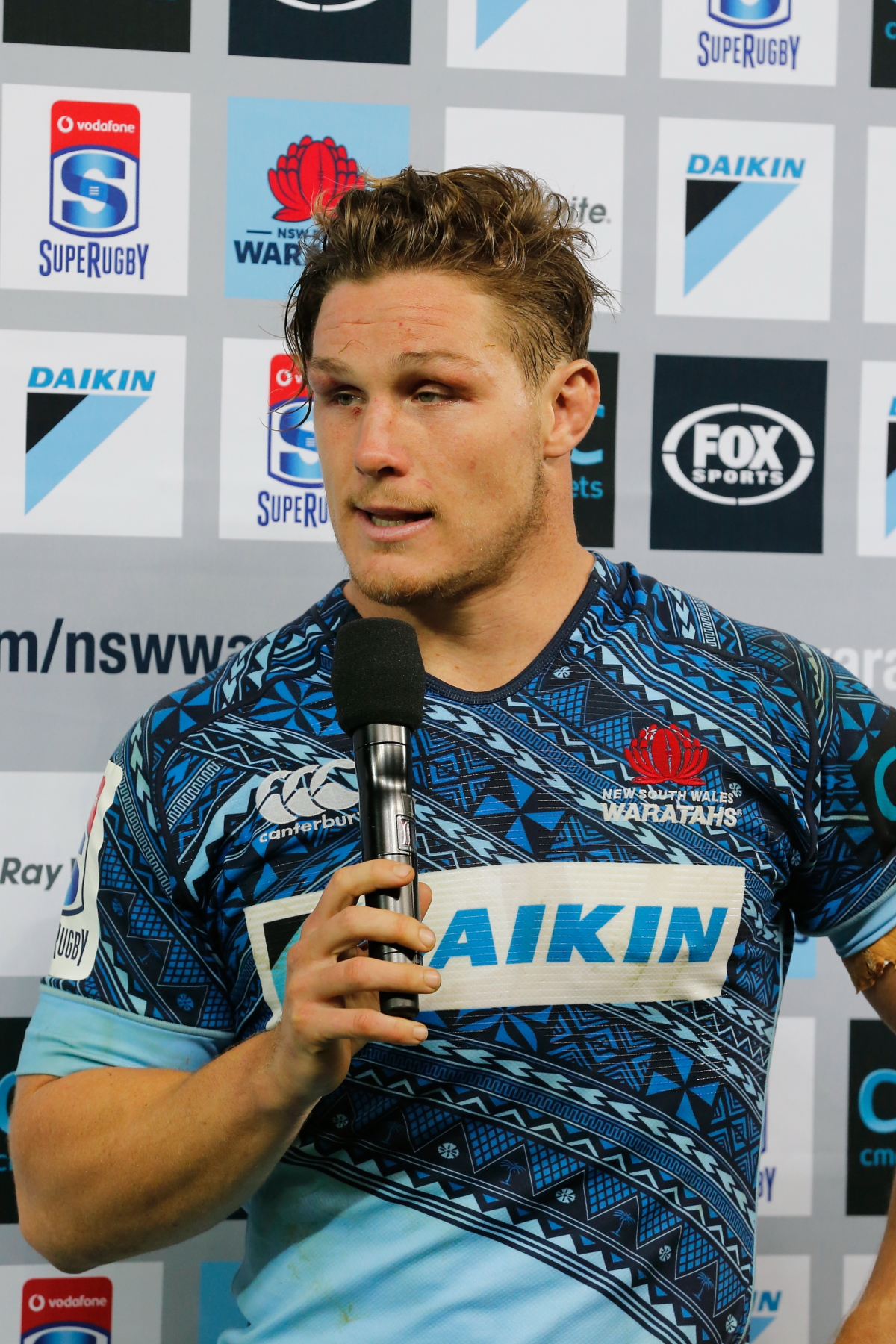
Hooper with the Waratahs, 2017.

Hooper made his Brumbies debut in 2010, as stand-in for the injured George Smith. Hooper would score a try on debut as the Brumbies ran out 30-23 victors over the Chiefs in Canberra.

After a breakout season for the Brumbies in 2012, he was signed by the New South Wales Waratahs for the 2013 season. 2012 had been a standout year for Hooper who won numerous accolades including Best Forward (for the Brumbies), the ARU's Rookie of Year and placing third for the John Eales Medal after playing less than half of the polling games.

In 2013, Hooper played every Waratahs Super Rugby game of the season and he won the Australian Super 15 Player of the Year award, as well as the Waratahs' Player of the Year award.

On the 1st of March 2014, Hooper was named captain for the Waratahs' clash with the Queensland Reds after team regular Dave Dennis was ruled out due to injury received in the Waratahs' first game of 2014 against the Western Force. Hooper led the Waratahs to a 32–5 win over the Reds at ANZ Stadium and went on to play all the remaining games of the 2014 season including the Grand Final against the Crusaders in which he captained the side to a 33–32 win at ANZ Stadium. It was the franchise's maiden Super Rugby title.

On 18 March 2017, Hooper played his 100th Super Rugby match, against his former team, the Brumbies. Aged just 25 years and 140 days, this made him the youngest and fastest player in Super Rugby history to reach the 100-cap milestone. The Waratahs would fall short of victory, as the Brumbies ran out 28-12 winners in Sydney.

On 20 April 2019, Hooper would make his 100th Super Rugby appearance for the Waratahs in a 23-20 victory over the Rebels at the Sydney Cricket Ground.

=== Top League ===
In August 2020, it was announced that Hooper had signed to play for the Japanese Top League club Toyota Verblitz for the 2020–21 season, marking his first serious move to play domestic rugby outside Super Rugby since starting his career with the Brumbies in 2010.

In January 2025, Hooper came out of retirement after signing a short-term deal with Toyota Verblitz. He would play the remainder of the season for the team before making his second and final retirement from professional rugby.

=== International ===
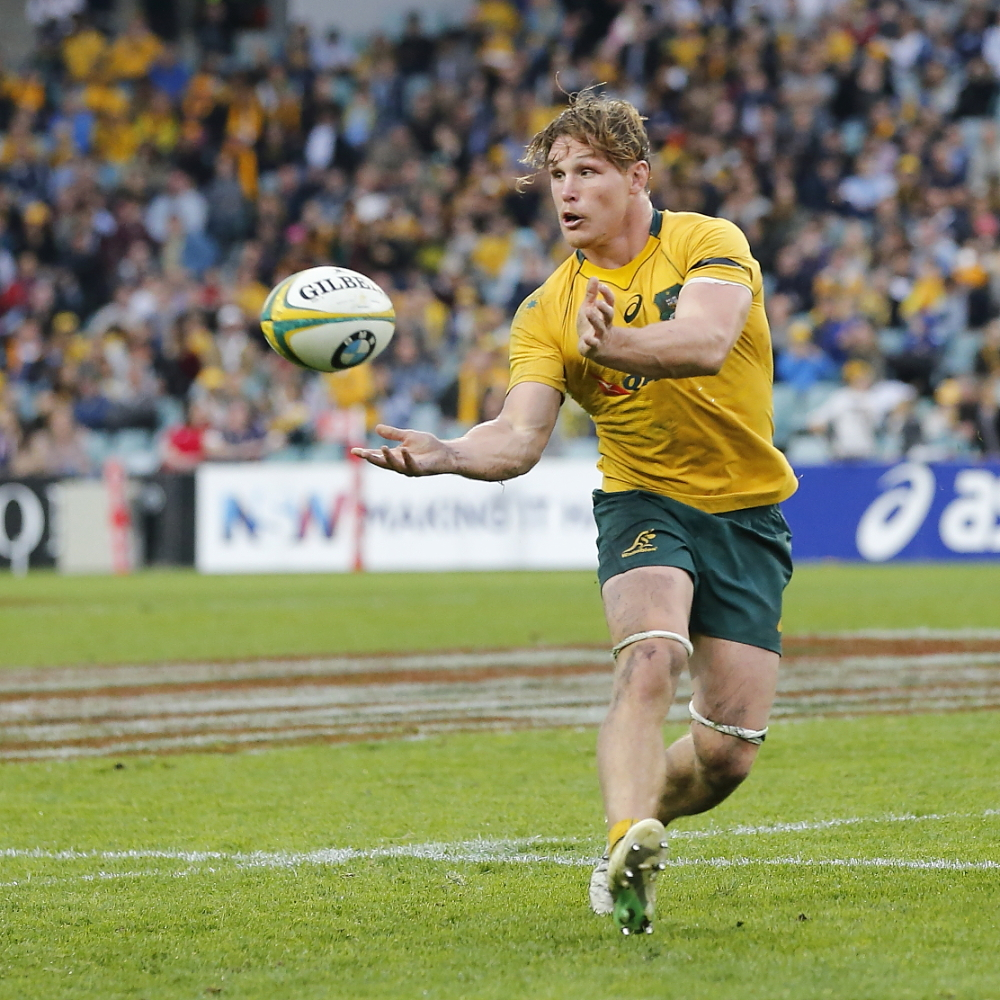
Hooper passing the ball against Scotland.

On 5 June 2012, Hooper made his international debut for Australia, coming off the bench (in the 65th minute) against Scotland in Newcastle. Following a knee injury to regular flanker and captain David Pocock, Hooper started in every Test game until the final Spring-Tour game (and Nathan Sharpe's final Wallabies game) against Wales in Cardiff, where he started from the bench to make-way for David Pocock. Hooper won Wallabies 'Rookie of the year' award at the annual John Eales Medal awards evening event.

In 2013, when David Pocock suffered a season-ending knee injury; Hooper played in all of the Wallabies Test matches and had an outstanding year, winning the John Eales Medal as 'Wallabies player of the year'.

In 2014, Pocock suffered another season-ending knee injury and in Ewen McKenzie's second year as Wallabies coach, McKenzie named Hooper as vice-captain with his Waratahs team-mate Adam Ashley-Cooper and his former Brumbies team-mate Stephen Moore was named as Australia captain for the 2014 three-test June series against France. However, when captain Stephen Moore left the field with a knee injury in the 5th minute, Hooper took over the captaincy for the rest of the game. During the game, he scored a try in the first half and he had a strong performance against France in the Wallabies' 50–23 win at Suncorp Stadium. Hooper was rated was one of the best players on the field during the game by Iain Payten of foxsports.com.au and was also labelled 'the Energizer Bunny of world rugby'.

Following the season-ending injury to Stephen Moore during the first test of 2014 against France in Brisbane, Hooper was named as Wallabies captain for the rest of the 2014 Test-season, meaning that he was the Wallabies 82nd Test captain and the youngest player (age 23, 233 days) to captain the side since Ken Catchpole (age 21, 354 days) in 1961.

Following another strong 2015 Super Rugby season, Hooper was awarded the Peoples Choice – Wallaby of the Year at the John Eales Medal awards night for the second year in a row. He also kept his starting position safe, forcing David Pocock into Number 8 after returning from injury. He was also selected in the 31-man 2015 Rugby World Cup squad. Hooper was nominated for the 2015 World Rugby Player of the Year award, with All Blacks fly-half Dan Carter ultimately claiming the honour.

In 2016, Hooper was again awarded the John Eales Medal, the 4th player to have won it a second time.

Hooper became the full-time Wallabies captain for the 2017 Rugby Championship, following Stephen Moore announcing that the 2017 season would be his final year of test rugby.

In August 2019, Hooper was named as captain in the 31-man Wallabies squad for the 2019 Rugby World Cup in Japan.

His very rough playing style has led Hooper to collect nine yellow cards in his international career, matched in this unenviable record only by the Georgian Viktor Kolelishvili.

In 2020, Hooper played his 100th test for Australia, becoming the fastest Wallaby to reach 100 tests. He also became the youngest-ever player to reach 100 tests for his country, although his record was later broken by Wales' centre, George North. Hooper's 100th test was a 16–16 draw with New Zealand, at the Wellington Regional Stadium. He went on to play all 6 of Australia's tests in 2020, under the new Head Coach, Dave Rennie. Following the conclusion of the 2020 season, Hooper was awarded the John Eales Medal for the third time.

In 2021, Hooper surpassed George Gregan's record for the most caps as Wallabies captain, 60. Hooper was awarded the John Eales Medal for a record fourth time. He was nominated for World Rugby Player of the Year for a second time, with France scrum-half Antoine Dupont ultimately winning the award for 2021.

In August 2023, Hooper was omitted from the Australian squad for the 2023 Rugby World Cup. At that time, Hooper was the fastest player to 50 caps and longest serving Wallabies captain Wallabies coach Eddie Jones cited Hooper's calf injury as a reason for his omission.

On the 30th of June 2024, Hooper announced his retirement from Australian rugby and his Olympic Rugby 7s bid.

== Personal life ==
His father is from Kent, England. Hooper grew up in Collaroy on the Northern Beaches of Sydney and currently resides in North Curl Curl.

Hooper and his wife, Kate Howard, have two children.

== Statistics ==
Test Record Overall
Opposition	Played	Won	Drawn	Loss	Winning%	Tries
Argentina	18	15	2	1	93.75	5
B&I Lions	3	1	0	2	33.33	0
England	15	3	0	12	20.00	3
Fiji	3	3	0	0	100.0	1
France	9	5	0	4	55.56	4
Ireland	7	2	0	5	28.57	2
Italy	4	4	0	0	100.0	0
Japan	2	2	0	0	100.0	0
New Zealand	29	4	3	22	18.96	2
Scotland	8	4	0	4	50.00	1
South Africa	17	7	2	8	41.18	2
Uruguay	1	1	0	0	100.0	0
Wales	9	7	0	2	77.77	2
Total	125	58	7	60	46.40	22

== Honours ==
=== Waratahs ===
- Super Rugby Champions: 2014
- Australian Conference Champions (3): 2014, 2015, 2018
- Play-off Appearances (6): 2011, 2014, 2015, 2018, 2022, 2023

=== Australia ===
- Rugby Championship Champions: 2015
- Mandela Challenge Plate (6): 2012,2015–2018,2021
- Rugby World Cup Runners Up: 2015

Preceded by David Pocock	Australian national rugby union captain 2014; 2015–2023	Succeeded by Will Skelton
