= John Eales Medal =

Award

The John Eales Medal is awarded to honour the best Australian rugby union player each year. The medal, which was launched in 2002, is jointly awarded each year by the Australian Rugby Union and the Rugby Union Players Association.

The medal is named after John Eales, arguably the most successful captain in the history of Australian Rugby.

Voting for the John Eales Medal is tallied after each Test match, with each Wallabies player awarding points on a 3–2–1 basis.

RUPA Chief Executive Tony Dempsey is quoted as saying:

This is the ultimate award. To be voted the best in your country by your own peers is the highest honour a player can hope to aspire to. Naming this award after Australia's most successful captain ever is fully endorsed by the Players. This has become one of the most sought after and coveted awards in Australian sport.

The winner of the 2021 medal, Michael Hooper, was honoured for a record fourth time.

== List of winners ==
Season	Winner
2002	George Smith
2003	Phil Waugh
2004	David Lyons
2005	Jeremy Paul
2006	Chris Latham
2007	Nathan Sharpe
2008	George Smith (2)
2009	Matt Giteau
2010	David Pocock
2011	Kurtley Beale
2012	Nathan Sharpe (2)
2013	Michael Hooper
2014	Israel Folau
2015	Israel Folau (2)
2016	Michael Hooper (2)
2017	Israel Folau (3)
2018	David Pocock (2)
2019	Marika Koroibete
2020	Michael Hooper (3)
2021	Michael Hooper (4)
2022	Marika Koroibete (2)
2023	Rob Valetini
2024	Rob Valetini (2)
2025	Len Ikitau
2026	Fraser McReight
