= Wallaby Team of the Decade =

To celebrate 10 years of professional rugby union, Australian Rugby celebrated the occasion with the announcement in 2005 of the Wallaby Team of the Decade. A Judging panel of 30 journalists and commentators voted on a starting XV and a bench, with 6 players (in italics below) being unanimous selections, the rest being selected in their respective positions.

The only five Australian players to have won 2 Rugby World Cups (1991 & 1999) have all been selected: Phil Kearns, John Eales, Tim Horan, Jason Little and Dan Crowley.

George Smith was the last player active until 2019.

== Team ==
Wallaby Team of the Decade

1. Richard Harry; Loosehead Prop	2. Phil Kearns; Hooker	3. Andrew Blades; Tighthead Prop
4. David Giffin; Lock	5. John Eales (c); Lock
6. Owen Finegan; Blindside Flanker	8. Toutai Kefu; Number 8	7. George Smith; Openside Flanker
9. George Gregan; Scrum Half
10. Stephen Larkham; Fly-half
12. Tim Horan; Inside Centre
13. Jason Little; Outside Centre
11. Joe Roff; Left Wing	14. Ben Tune; Right Wing
15. Matthew Burke; Fullback
Reserves: 16. Jeremy Paul, 17. Dan Crowley, 18. Nathan Sharpe, 19. Phil Waugh, 20. Chris Whitaker, 21. Dan Herbert, 22. Lote Tuqiri
Coach: Rod Macqueen
