= Stephen Larkham =

Australian rugby union player and coach

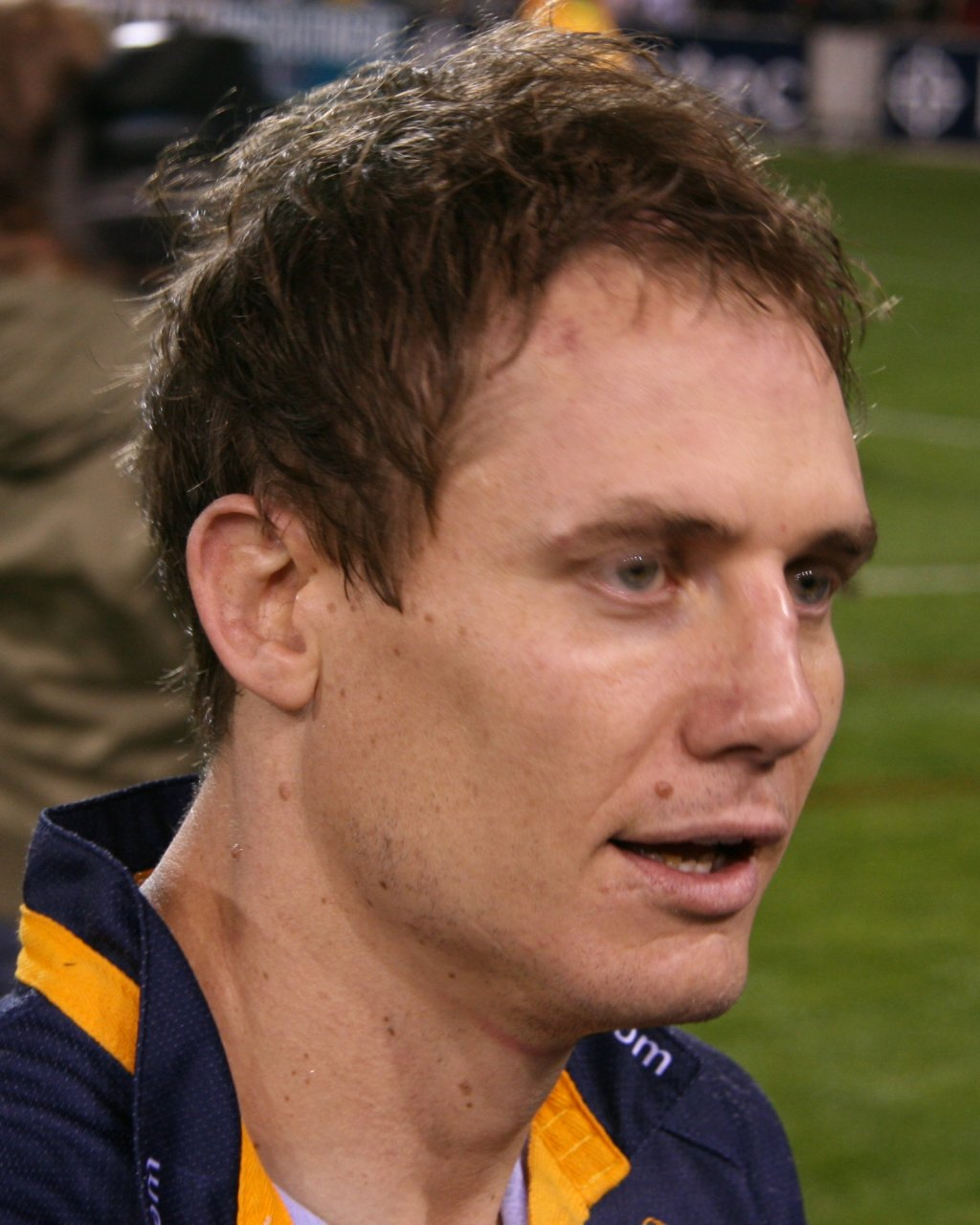
- Larkham in 2007
- Born: 29 May 1974 (age 52) Canberra, ACT, Australia
- Height: 189 cm (6 ft 2 in)
- Weight: 88 kg (13.9 st; 194 lb)
- School: Lyneham High, Canberra; Dickson College Canberra
- University: Australian National University

Rugby union career
- Position(s): Fly-half, Inside centre, Fullback
Senior career
Years	Team	Apps	(Points)
2008–2010	Ricoh Black Rams		
Provincial / State sides
Years	Team	Apps	(Points)
1990–2004	ACT & S. NSW	112	(214)
- Correct as of 9 September 2008
Super Rugby
Years	Team	Apps	(Points)
1996–2007	Brumbies	127	(204)
- Correct as of 2007-09-12
International career
Years	Team	Apps	(Points)
1996–2007	Australia	102	(135)
- Correct as of 2007-11-12
Coaching career
- Years: Team
- 2011–2013: Brumbies (Asst. coach)
- 2014–2017: Brumbies
- 2015–2019: Australia (Attack coach)
- 2019–2022: Munster (Senior coach)
- 2022–: Brumbies

Stephen Larkham (born 29 May 1974) is an Australian professional rugby union coach and former player, currently the head coach of the Brumbies. He spent his career with the Brumbies in Super Rugby, for whom he played from the inception of the professional Super 12 in 1996 through 2007, and helped them win titles in 2001 and 2004. He is best known for his long tenure with the Wallabies at international level, for whom he played 102 times. After initially being selected at fullback from 1996 to 1997, Larkham was Australia's first-choice fly-half from 1998 to 2007, During this period, he represented Australia at the 1999, 2003, and 2007 Rugby World Cups, winning the 1999 tournament.

== Playing career ==
Having started his career as a fullback, Larkham was moved to fly-half in his 13th Test for the Wallabies in a match against England in Brisbane in 1998. In 2005, Larkham was named at the position in Australia's team of the decade (the "decade" being the first 10 years of professional rugby union). At his peak, Larkham was one of the best flyhalves in world rugby, with reputation as an elusive runner and the lynchpin of a potent backline.

He first gained notice in 1995 when he was plucked from reserve grade club rugby to represent ACT in the Super 12 as a utility back in the Brumbies squad, playing a number of Super 12 games before attracting the attention of the national selectors. Larkham made his test debut as a reserve against Wales in Sydney in 1996 when he replaced injured Ben Tune on the wing, and then joined the Wallabies on their undefeated tour of Europe. In 1997, Larkham proved more than a capable replacement at fullback for the injured Matt Burke, with a two-try effort in the Wallabies final Test against Scotland at Murrayfield. On 16 January 2008 Larkham signed a three-year contract with Japanese club Ricoh Black Rams. After two full seasons in Japan, Larkham negotiated an early release in order to return to Australia. He played in Japan for the first half of the 2010–11 Top League season playing for the Ricoh Black Rams in Japan and then returned to Canberra in November 2010 to take up the role of attack coach for the Brumbies.

=== Fullback to Fly Half transition ===
Larkham's conversion from fullback to flyhalf is now hailed as a Rod Macqueen masterstroke that put the Wallabies on track to win the 1999 Rugby World Cup. This was initially a controversial selection as his tactical kicking was regarded as too weak for the position; however, his ability to get the Australian back line going and to slide through gaps himself quickly ended the debate. Simon Poidevin while commenting for Australian TV remarked during the third test against the All Blacks in 1998 that "anyone who thinks (Larkham) is a dud flyhalf needs their head read" (i.e. is wrong) and this was eventually accepted to be correct.

=== 1999 Rugby World Cup drop-goal ===
Larkham's famous 48m-drop goal to seal victory over South Africa in extra time of the 1999 Rugby World Cup semi-final has gone down in rugby folklore as the defining moment in the Wallabies' victorious Rugby World Cup campaign. South Africa had got to the semi-final largely through the efforts of Jannie de Beer kicking five drop goals in their previous match. The fact that Larkham had quite a badly injured knee through the match caused Steve Smith to remark incredulously while calling the game for English ITV "He can barely stand on that leg and yet he just thwacked it over." The feat was even more remarkable as Larkham's eyesight was very poor at the time. Since 1999 he has had laser surgery to correct his vision, however at the time he could not see the goal posts clearly.

Following Australia's victory over France in the World Cup final, several television commercials aired in Australia humorously mocking Larkham's lack of kicking prowess. The commercial featured players and coaches expressing their astonishment that Larkham scored. The commercial begins with Larkham's school coaches saying he was a poor kicker, and had never successfully scored a drop-goal in a match. The climax of the commercial features then-captain John Eales, as well as Matt Burke, Phil Kearns and coach Rod MacQueen each saying "Don't kick it!" as footage of the moment is replayed. The commercial is available to view on YouTube.

=== Later career ===
Larkham was an important part of the Australian 2003 World Cup squad which lost in the tournament final to England. He has suffered greatly from injuries through his career, especially to his knees and right elbow. Despite these he remained a competent defender in spite of his relatively light frame. He was also tried at inside centre by John Connolly for one test against Wales in 2006 but the experiment was not regarded a success and he never played there again.

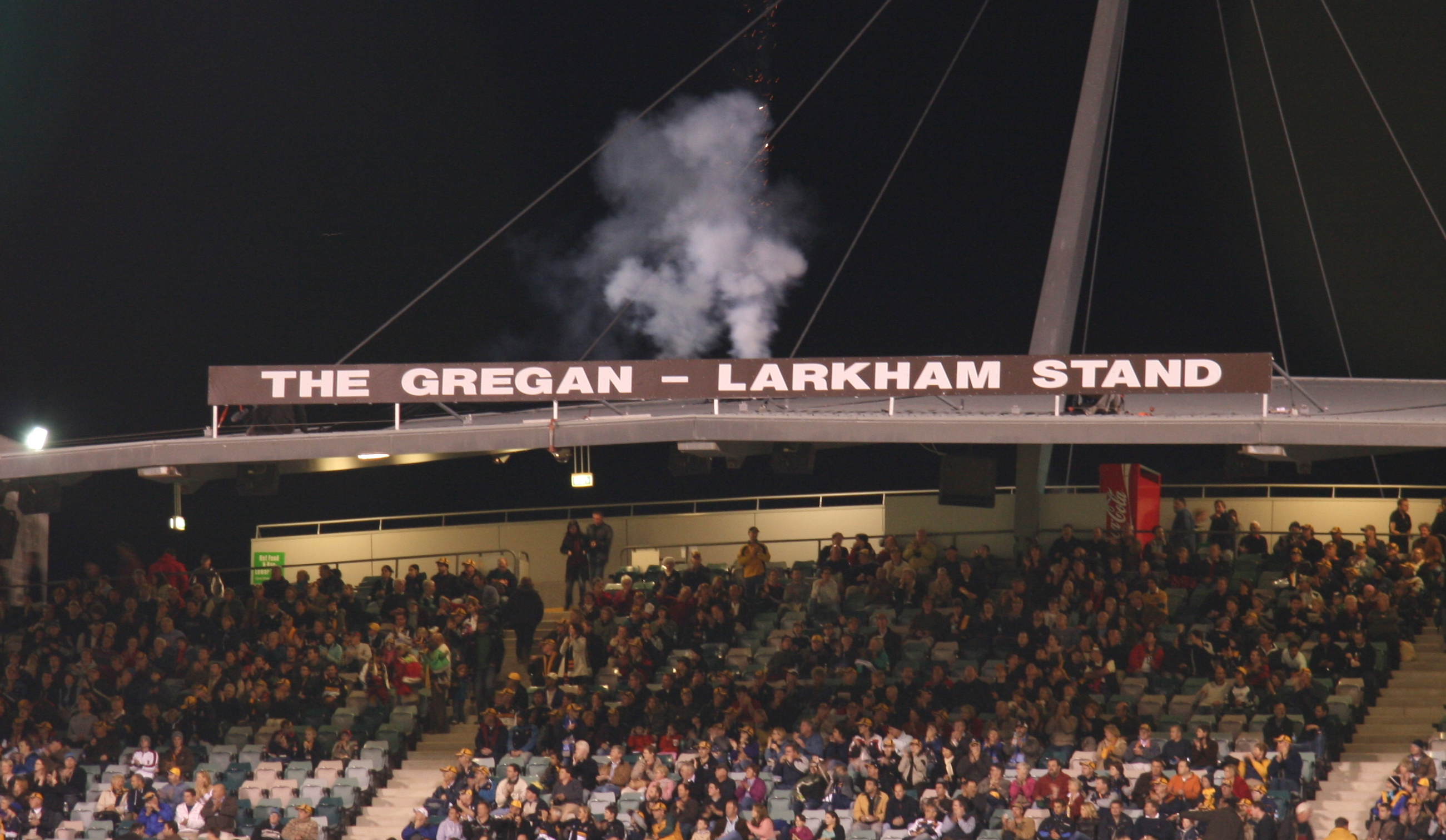
The Gregan - Larkham Grandstand at Canberra Stadium

He was famous for forming a long-standing half-back partnership with George Gregan, both of whom were foundation players with the ACT Brumbies rugby franchise. When both retired after the 2007 World Cup, not only were they the two most-capped Wallabies, but they played in more Tests than any other scrum-half/fly-half combination in history, with 79 appearances together. So important were they to the team that in 2007 at Bruce Stadium (Canberra Stadium), a new stand was unveiled as the "Gregan-Larkham Stand" in honour of both players and their combination to the team.

He played his last test against Japan in the 2007 World Cup before a knee injury sidelined him, which effectively ended his Test career as Australia were then knocked out of the competition before he could return.

On 14 May 2007, despite larger offers from French and English teams, Larkham signed a contract with Edinburgh Rugby in Scotland to join them after the 2007 World Cup; however; this deal subsequently fell through, reportedly because the Scottish Rugby Union would not fund the deal. Newly promoted Leeds expressed an interest, as did the Welsh side, the Dragons. However, in January 2008 it was announced that he will join Ricoh Black Rams of Japan.

Larkham played for the ACT Veterans Rugby Club at the World Vintage Rugby Carnival in Hawaii in September 2012. During this carnival he also played as a reserve for an old boys team from Brazil who, not realising who he was, asked him to play second row because he was tall. Despite his other commitments, Larkham occasionally still plays with the ACT Veterans to help them raise funds for the charities they support. On 18 February 2018, he received the GENLEC Player of the Day Jacket for his great play and sportsmanship in the Clare Holland Cup charity match.

== Coaching career ==
=== Brumbies and Australia ===
In 2010, Larkham returned to the Brumbies ahead of the 2011 Super Rugby season to take up the role of attack coach. He worked under the head coach of Tony Rea who left the franchise at the end of that season. Larkham and newly appointed head coach Jake White made a formidable duo, as during the 2012 Super Rugby season, the Brumbies went from being the fourth best Australian franchise to the second best behind the Queensland Reds. Larkham's attacking influence saw the Brumbies pick up 5 bonus points wins, and an overall better point difference in favor of for. He guided Matt To'omua and Christian Lealiifano to world class fly-half options, which helped the Brumbies secure the top Australian conference position during the 2013 Super Rugby season, finishing second overall losing in the final to the Chiefs 27–22. In 2014, Jake White dramatically resigned as head coach, with Larkham and Laurie Fisher being appointed joint coaches for that season. They finished second in the Australian conference and fourth in the standings after the regular season. They faced the Waratahs in the semi-final, losing 26–8 in Sydney.

In 2015, Fisher left his role to join Gloucester, with Stephen being appointed head coach. In Larkhams's debut season as head coach, he led the Brumbies to the semi-final of the 2015 Super Rugby season, finishing sixth in the overall standings at the end of the regular season. The Brumbies finished with 9 out of 16 wins, which included 3 wins over South African opposition and 2 wins over New Zealand opposition. The season also included a 29–0 win over the Queensland Reds in Brisbane, to make the Brumbies the first team to have held a team scoreless twice against the same opponent. During the qualifier round, the Brumbies convincingly beat the Stormers in Cape Town 39–19, to set up an away semi-finals against first seeds Hurricanes. The Brumbies lost this match 29–9 to be eliminated from Champions contention.

On 27 February 2015, newly appointed Wallabies coach Michael Cheika appointed Larkham as the backs and attack coach for the national side for the 2015 Rugby World Cup. That campaign saw a marked improvement in the team's performance, with the Australians winning the shortened Rugby Championship competition that year, going on to eliminate World Cup hosts England in pool play, and contesting the final against New Zealand (losing 34–17). Larkham remained with the national side until February 2019, when he was controversially sacked by Cheika after coming under intense pressure following a number of years of poor results.

=== Munster ===
Larkham joined Irish provincial side Munster as their senior coach ahead of the Northern Hemisphere 2019–20 season, where he works alongside head coach Johann van Graan, defence coach JP Ferreira and forwards coach Graham Rowntree. Larkham left Munster upon the conclusion of the 2021–22 season to return to his native Australia.

=== Return to Brumbies ===
Larkham returned to Brumbies in July 2022 to take up the position of head coach for the 2023 and 2024 Super Rugby Pacific seasons.

== Honours ==
Larkham was inducted into the Sport Australia Hall of Fame in 2012. He was admitted to the World Rugby Hall of Fame in 2018.

== See also ==
- Brumbies
- Wallabies
- Wallaby Team of the Decade
- List of rugby union test caps leaders
- ACT Veterans Rugby Club
