= Tony Dempsey =

Tony Dempsey may refer to:

- Tony Dempsey (politician) (born 1944), Irish former Fianna Fáil politician
- Tony Dempsey (rugby union) (born 1966), Australian former rugby union player
