= Jack Dempsey (rugby union) =

Australia & Scotland international rugby union player

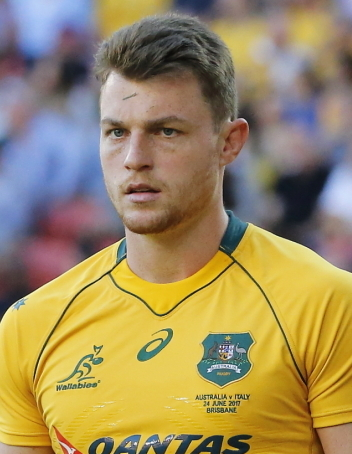
- Dempsey representing Australia in 2017.
- Full name: John Francis Dempsey
- Born: 12 April 1994 (age 32) Sydney, New South Wales, Australia
- Height: 1.90 m (6 ft 3 in)
- Weight: 111 kg (245 lb; 17 st 7 lb)
- School: St. Ignatius' College
- University: University of Technology Sydney
- Notable relative: Tony Dempsey (uncle)

Rugby union career
- Position(s): Number 8, Flanker
- Current team: Toshiba Brave Lupus
Senior career
Years	Team	Apps	(Points)
2013–2020	Gordon	34	(140)
2014–2018	Sydney	18	(28)
2015–2021	Waratahs	52	(40)
2021–2026	Glasgow Warriors	67	(50)
2026–	Toshiba Brave Lupus		
International career
Years	Team	Apps	(Points)
2012	Australia U18	5	(0)
2013–2014	Australia U20	10	(0)
2017–2019	Australia	14	(5)
2022–	Scotland	37	(20)
- Correct as of 18 November 2026

John Francis Dempsey (born 12 April 1994) is a professional rugby union player who plays as a number eight for United Rugby Championship club Glasgow Warriors. Born in Australia, he represents Scotland at international level after qualifying on ancestry grounds.

== Club career ==
Dempsey played for Gordon. He helped the club win the 2020 Shute Shield. Dempsey played domestically in Australia for the North Harbour Rays who compete in the National Rugby Championship. He was then called up by the Waratahs.

Dempsey moved to Scotland in 2021 to play for Glasgow Warriors. He has relatives in the city, as his maternal grandfather emigrated to Australia from Glasgow. Of the move to the Warriors, Dempsey stated:

The history that Glasgow has with fast-paced footie – with quick ruck speed – is something which very much suits my game. So, it is kind of a combination of wanting a character like me to add depth and being that tool in the tool chest within the back-row, but also I do suit the identity and style that Glasgow want to play as well.

Dempsey made his debut for Glasgow in the 'Clash of the Warriors' pre-season fixture with Worcester, with Glasgow winning the inaugural cup 27 - 22. He made his competitive debut for Glasgow in the 24 September 2021 match against Ulster away at Ravenhill Stadium in the United Rugby Championship - earning the Glasgow Warrior No. 331.

At the end of a successful season, Dempsey was awarded The XVIth Warrior Player of the Year award by the official supporters club.

== International career ==
Dempsey represented Australia at schoolboy and under-20 level. He was capped for Australia against Italy, coming off the bench at Lang Park in Brisbane on 24 June 2017. Dempsey was a member of the Wallabies 2019 Rugby World Cup squad who were knocked out in the quarter-finals in Japan, but did not play for Australia after that.

After a three-year stand-down period from international rugby, Dempsey made his debut for Scotland on 29 October 2022 against Australia, the country he previously played for. In 2023 Dempsey was selected in the 33 player squad for the 2023 Rugby World Cup in France.
