= David Pocock =

Australian politician and former rugby union player (born 1988)

Senator David Pocock
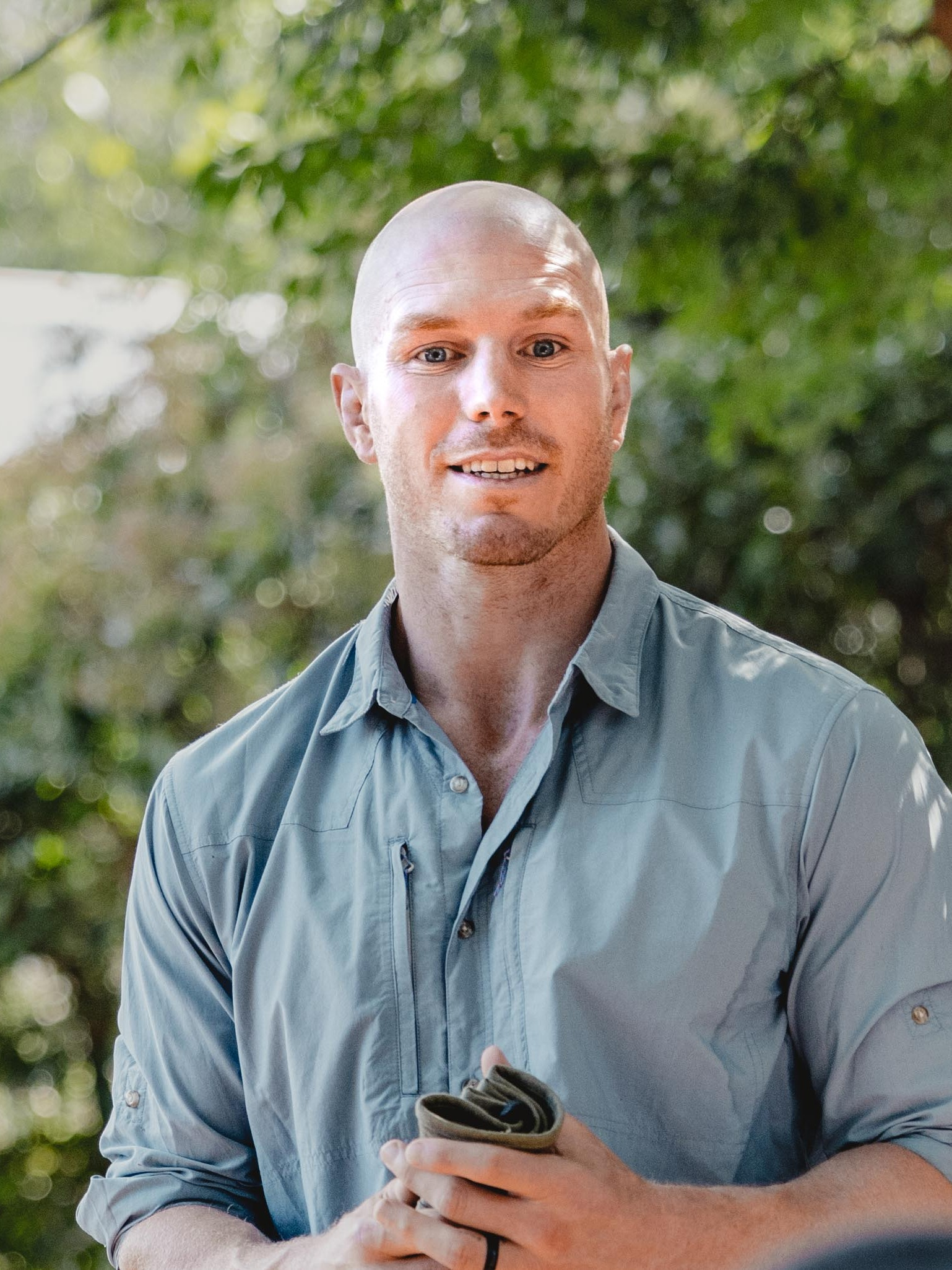
- Pocock in 2022

Senator for the Australian Capital Territory
- Incumbent
- Assumed office 21 May 2022 Serving with Katy Gallagher
- Preceded by: Zed Seselja

Personal details
- Born: David Willmer Pocock; 23 April 1988 (age 38) Messina, Transvaal, South Africa
- Citizenship: Australian; Zimbabwean (until 2022); South African (until 2022)
- Party: Independent (Note: For the purposes of appearing above the line on the Senate ballot paper, Pocock is registered as a member of a political party named 'David Pocock'. However, he sits in the Senate as an independent.)
- Spouse: Emma Palandri (m. 2018)
- Education: Charles Sturt University
- Website: Official website
- Height: 1.83 m (6 ft 0 in)
- Weight: 103 kg (227 lb)

Rugby union career
- Position(s): Flanker, No. 8
Senior career
| Years | Team | Apps | (Points) |
| 2016−2020 | Panasonic Wild Knights | 21 | (15) |
- Correct as of 22 February 2020
Super Rugby
| Years | Team | Apps | (Points) |
| 2006–2012 | Force | 69 | (40) |
| 2013–2019 | Brumbies | 43 | (60) |
- Correct as of 8 March 2019
International career
| Years | Team | Apps | (Points) |
| 2008–2019 | Australia | 83 | (45) |
- Correct as of 24 September 2024

David Willmer Pocock (born 23 April 1988) is an Australian politician and former professional rugby union player. Born in South Africa and then raised in Gweru, Zimbabwe, Pocock moved to Australia as a teenager and played for the Australia national rugby team. He played primarily at openside flanker, and was vice captain of the Brumbies in Super Rugby. After his retirement, Pocock worked as a conservationist and social justice advocate. In the 2022 Australian federal election, Pocock ran as an independent candidate for one of the Australian Capital Territory's two Senate seats. He defeated Liberal incumbent senator Zed Seselja, becoming the first independent to represent the ACT in the Senate since the territory gained Senate representation in 1975.

== Early life and education ==
David Willmer Pocock was born on 23 April 1988 in Messina, South Africa. He is the oldest of three sons born to Jane (née Ferguson) and Andy Pocock. He spent his first year on a citrus estate, "Denlynian", in Beitbridge, Zimbabwe, which was bought by his grandfather Ian Ferguson in the 1960s and ultimately employed up to 300 people. He was born in South Africa at the hospital nearest to his parents' home which was in Zimbabwe.

When Pocock was a child, his parents moved north to Gweru and joined his paternal grandfather and uncle on a 2,800-hectare (6,900-acre) mixed farm, growing vegetables and flowers for export and also running cattle. He attended Midlands Christian College, where he began playing rugby. In 2000, following Robert Mugabe's seizure of white-owned farms in Zimbabwe, Pocock's parents applied to immigrate to Australia. They were soon given a notice of compulsory acquisition requiring them to vacate their property within 90 days, after which they stayed in a family holiday home in Port Alfred, South Africa, for eight months. They received Australian visas in 2002 and settled in Brisbane, Queensland.

Pocock was educated at the Anglican Church Grammar School in Brisbane. In 2005, he played in the school's undefeated premiership-winning 1st XV alongside future Australia teammate Quade Cooper. That same year, he was selected to play in the Australian Schoolboys team.

== Rugby career ==
=== Stints with the Force and Brumbies (Super Rugby) ===
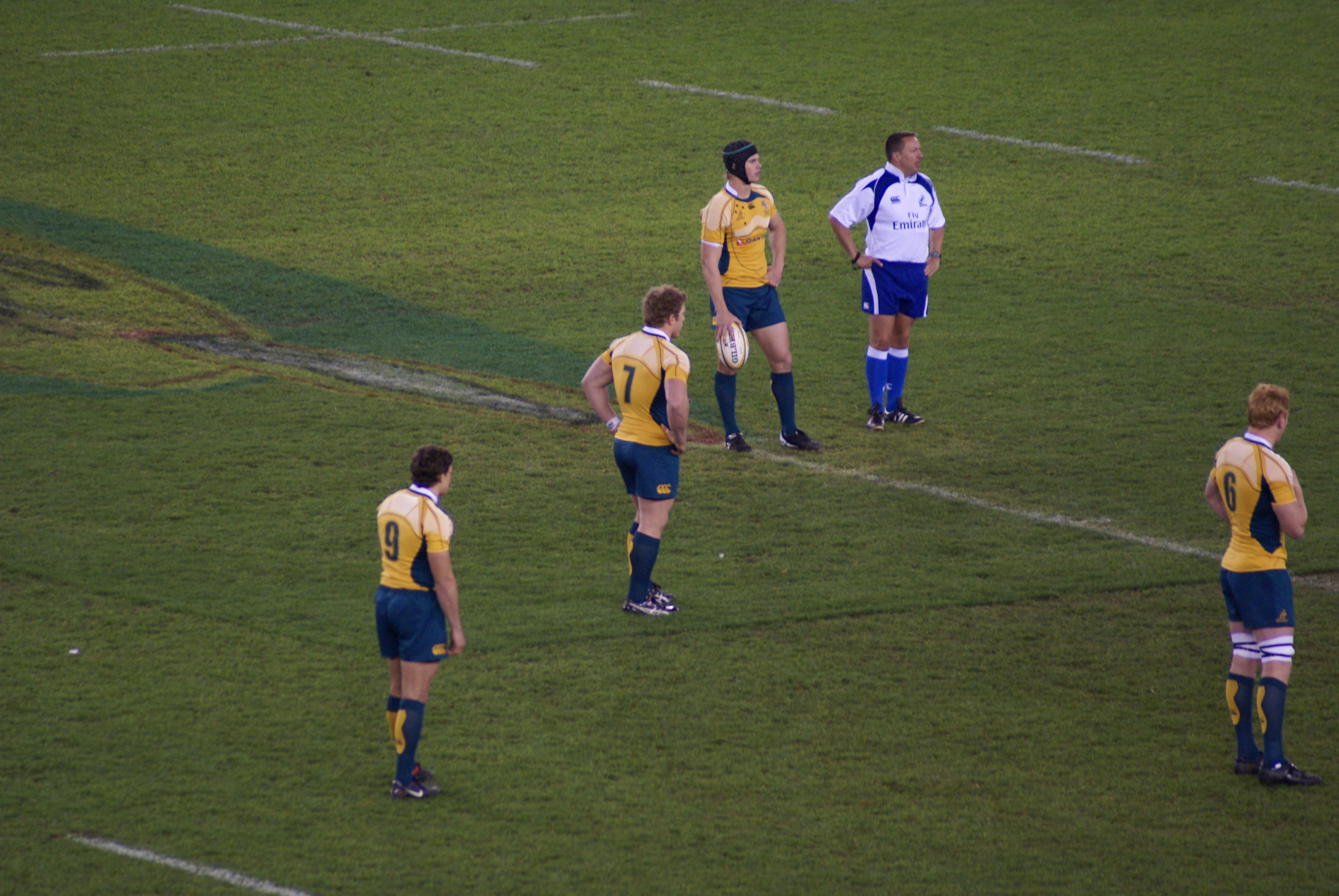
Pocock (7) playing for Australia in 2009

Pocock played for the Western Force, where he made his debut in 2006 against the Sharks in Durban. Pocock made appearances for Australian Schoolboys and Australia A in the 2007 IRB Pacific Nations Cup, earning man of the match multiple times in the tournament. He then made his Australia debut as a substitute against the Barbarians on 3 December 2008.

Pocock made his test debut in Hong Kong against New Zealand in late 2008, and then played against Italy and the Barbarians on the Wallabies spring tour. That same year he also captained the Australian Under 20s at the Junior World Championships in Wales, and was then awarded the Emirates Western Force captaincy for the development tour of England.

In 2009 Pocock played 13 Super Rugby games and was again called up to the Wallabies Squad. The year 2009 was a breakthrough year, during which he featured in 13 of the 14 Tests played by Australia – including a man of the match effort in the drawn Test against Ireland at Croke Park, as well as a maiden Test try during the 33–12 win over Wales at Cardiff. Pocock had earlier started the year by scoring his first try for his adopted country during the 55–7 win over the Barbarians in a non-cap match in Sydney. As a credit to his improving performance in the game Pocock replaced longstanding Wallaby openside flanker George Smith, late in the 2009 Tri-Nations. In the Wales test in the 2009 Autumn Internationals, he put his thumb back into its socket after it had been dislocated and continued to play. He was, however, substituted at half-time and replaced by George Smith.

In 2010, Pocock became the first choice openside flanker for the Wallabies. He won the John Eales Medal in 2010 – the highest honour in Australian Rugby. Pocock was recognised at an international level after being nominated alongside five other players for 2010 IRB Player of the Year, an award given to the best player in world rugby. In addition he was recognised with the Australia's Choice Wallaby of the Year and awarded the Rugby Union Players Association (RUPA) Medal of Excellence.

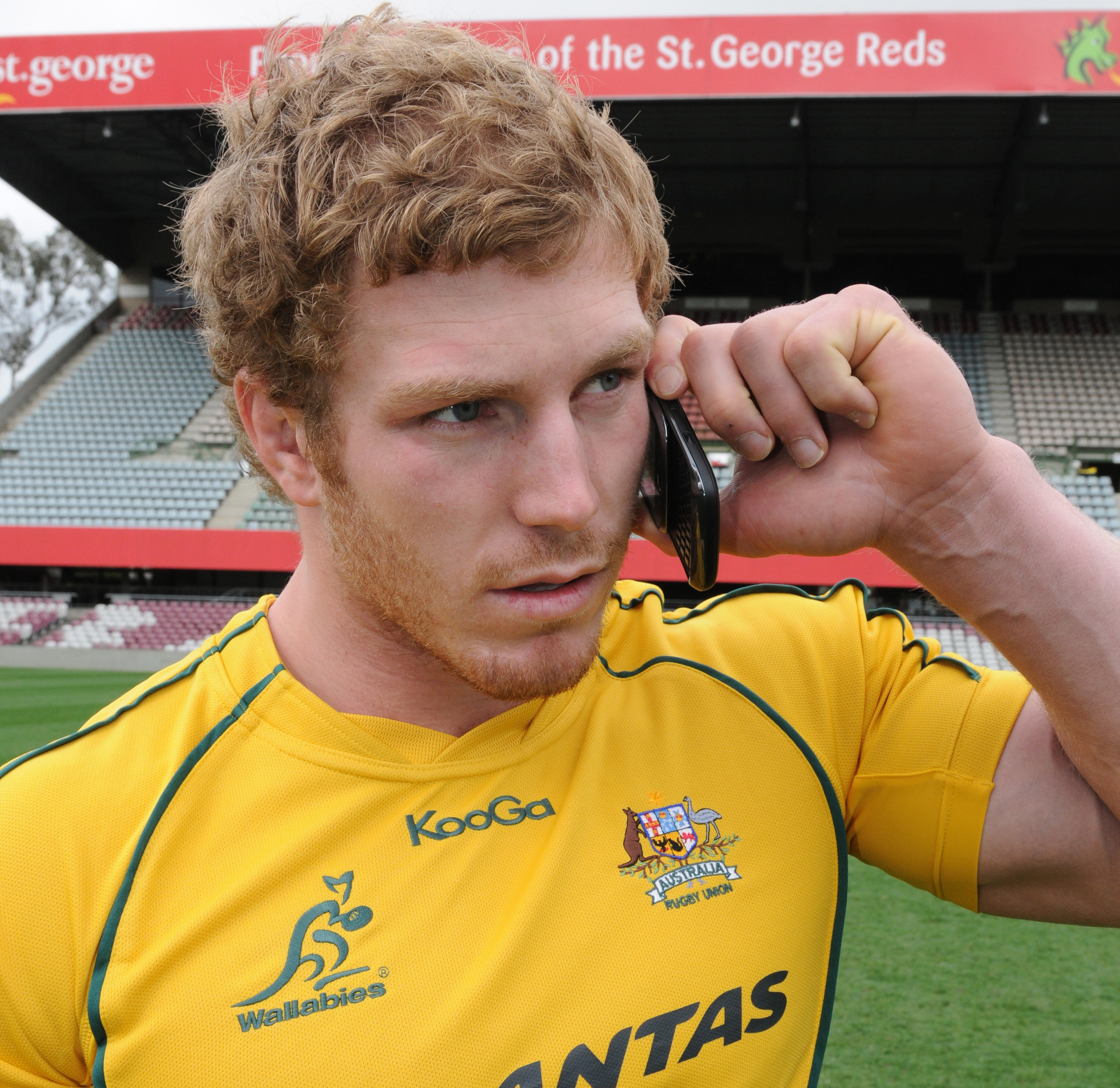
Pocock in 2011

In both 2010 and 2011, Pocock was a finalist for the IRB International Player of the Year.

Pocock took over the Wallabies captaincy during the 2012 midseason test series when regular captain James Horwill was injured.

At the conclusion of the 2012 Super Rugby season, he left the Western Force to join the ACT Brumbies.

In 2013, he underwent a knee reconstruction, and Michael Hooper became the Wallabies first choice number 7.

In 2014, in the course of his third game back after knee reconstruction, he damaged his anterior cruciate ligament (ACL) and had another knee reconstruction in late March 2014. On 15 January 2015, Pocock and teammate Nic White were appointed vice-captains of the Brumbies for the 2015 Super Rugby season.

He played in all three games during the 2015 Rugby Championship, Australia won all those games and won the trophy for the first time since the 2011 Tri Nations Series.

On 23 September 2015, Pocock scored two tries in Australia's opening game of the 2015 Rugby World Cup, a 28–13 win against Fiji at the Millennium Stadium, as well as also scoring a try in the 2015 Rugby World Cup final defeat to the New Zealand All Blacks.

=== Stint with Panasonic Wild Knights (Top League) ===
Pocock signed a three-year deal with the Panasonic Wild Knights of Japan's Top League in May 2016. The deal, agreed on in negotiations that also involved the Australian Rugby Union (now Rugby Australia), was structured to make him eligible to play for Australia in the 2019 Rugby World Cup. He played the 2016–17 Japanese season with the Wild Knights; once that season ended in January 2017, he took a sabbatical from all rugby until the start of the Wild Knights' 2017–18 season. Immediately after the end of that season, he returned to Australia to play for the Brumbies in the 2018 and 2019 Super Rugby seasons, skipping the 2018–19 Japanese season. On 6 September 2019, Pocock announced his international retirement after the 2019 World Cup in Japan, where he would then complete his Japanese contract in 2019–20.

=== Activism during rugby career ===
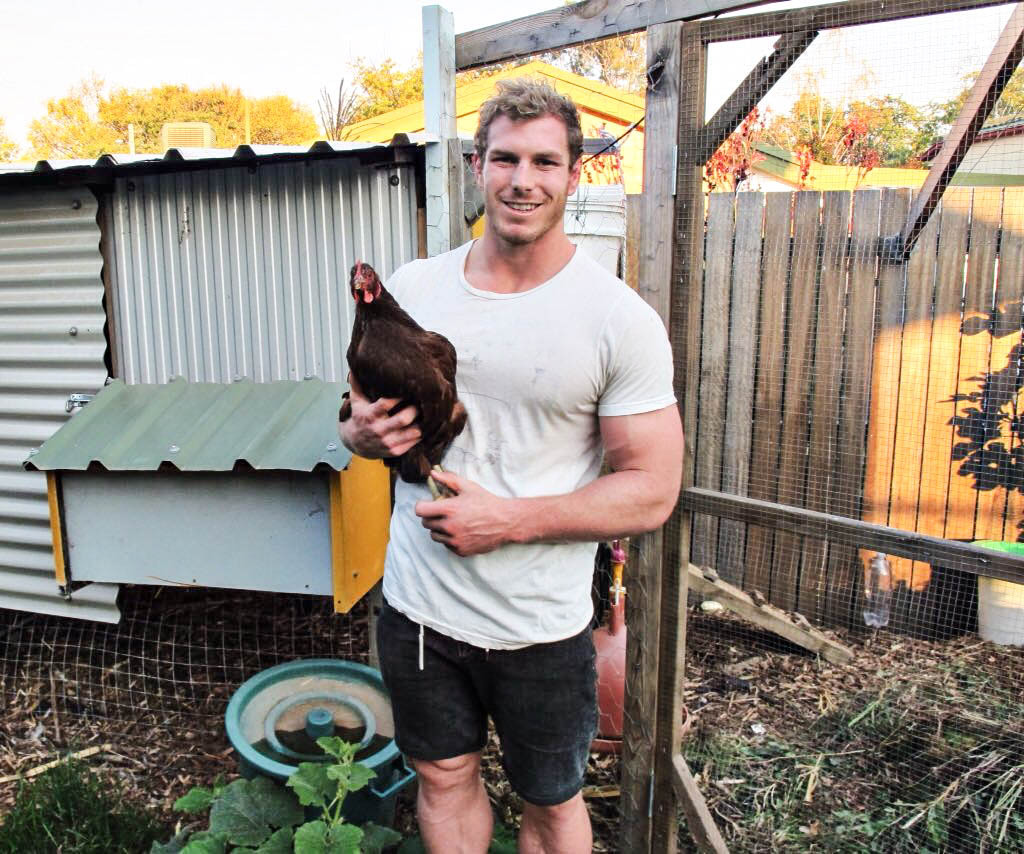
Pocock in 2016

In 2012, Pocock publicly supported the Australian Government's since-revoked fixed price Emissions Trading Scheme, saying, "Climate change is one of the biggest challenges of our time and to finally see the government taking action is a bit of a turning point... It's probably not the perfect model, but I think it's a really good start and it's something we need to do for the future of Australians." In 2014, Pocock visited the Leard Blockade against the expansion of the Maules Creek mine in the Leard State Forest and was arrested for taking part in a nonviolent protest.

Pocock was a public advocate in the campaign for same-sex marriage in Australia. Although he and his partner Emma held a marriage ceremony in 2010, they had refused to sign documents that would result in their legal marriage until all Australians had the right to do the same. Roughly one year after the country enacted legislation to allow same-sex marriage in 2017, they officially signed marriage documentation on 1 December 2018.

=== Retirement from rugby ===
On 23 October 2020 Pocock announced his retirement from all forms of rugby to focus on conservation efforts. In 2021, Pocock graduated with a Master of Sustainable Agriculture from Charles Sturt University which he began in 2013 while playing rugby.

== Political career ==
In December 2021, Pocock announced he would be running as a candidate for the Senate, representing the Australian Capital Territory (ACT) in the forthcoming 2022 election. In an interview on Television New Zealand's Q+A with Jack Tame in May, Pocock explained his reasons for running for the Australian Senate as an independent candidate and how he hoped to bring a socially progressive voice to the Senate and reform the integrity monitoring process for politicians in parliament. He prosecuted an agenda to tackle corruption in government and political advertising laws, as well as campaigns to increase Australia's expenditure on renewable energy and restore the rights of territories to legislate on euthanasia. Pocock was declared elected by the Australian Electoral Commission on 14 June 2022, thereby winning the second of the two ACT seats and unseating incumbent Liberal Senator Zed Seselja to become the first non-Labor or Liberal candidate to be elected as a Senator for the ACT, and the second non-Labor or Liberal person elected to represent the ACT at the federal level (after Lewis Nott, who was MP for the ACT in 1949–1951).

Pocock has promoted accessibility for the hearing-impaired. He sought to bring an Auslan interpreter to the Senate floor for his first speech as a member of that body on 1 August 2022. Under Senate rules, Pocock was required to ask permission to bring a "stranger" to the floor, which is almost exclusively used for visiting dignitaries. The Greens supported his request, but both major parties opposed it, fearing that it would set a precedent to invite more "strangers". The government soon offered a compromise of having an interpreter shown on screens placed on the floor of the Senate. Pocock stated that he would pursue rules changes to allow Auslan interpreters on the Senate floor. During a 2015 rugby union match in which he scored a hat-trick, he made the Auslan sign for applause after one of his tries as a shout-out to a friend whose first language was Auslan.

In July 2022, Pocock opposed the Labor government's defunding of the Australian Building and Construction Commission but reversed his position to vote in favour of abolishing the ABCC in November 2022.

In November 2022, Pocock successfully negotiated an amendment to create the "Economic Inclusion Advisory Committee", which would publish yearly recommendations on the adequacy of welfare payments two weeks before each federal budget, in exchange for passing Labor's changes to industrial relations reforms. Ahead of the 2023 Australian federal budget, Pocock agreed with the committee's recommendation for a substantial increase to the JobSeeker Payment as a first priority, and criticised the Labor government for not "do[ing] more to protect the most vulnerable."

Pocock is the Independent ACT Whip for the Australian Senate.

Pocock was re-elected in 2025, with his ticket doubling its support compared to the 2022 election, and placing first ahead of the Labor ticket in the ACT. Pocock and Labor incumbent Katy Gallagher (the government's finance minister) were both re-elected.

=== Eponymous political party ===
David Pocock
- Abbreviation: DP
- Leader: David Pocock
- Founded: 2021; 5 years ago
- Registered: 18 March 2022; 4 years ago
- Ideology: Social progressivism Anti-corruption
- Colours: Red
- Senate: 1 / 2 (ACT seats)

Website
- www.davidpocock.com.au

David Pocock, sometimes referred to as the David Pocock Party, is an Australian political party founded by Pocock in 2021.

Under the Australian Senate electoral system, only registered political parties are able to have a name and logo appear above the line on the ballot paper. The Pocock campaign said without appearing above the line, Pocock "would have had no chance of winning". Another independent senate candidate for the ACT, Kim Rubenstein, also set up her own party – Kim for Canberra – for the same purpose. David Pocock was successfully registered with the Australian Electoral Commission as a party on 18 March 2022. Despite being a member of the party, Pocock is listed as an independent by the parliamentary website.

Following the 2022 election, the party declared almost $1.7M in total donations, including $856,382 from Climate 200. In the leadup to the 2025 Australian federal election, Pocock renounced his backing by Climate 200, potentially as it was causing him to be categorised as a Teal independent, which he has never identified his beliefs with.

Thomas Emerson, who was elected to the ACT Legislative Assembly in 2024 as the leader of Independents for Canberra, was previously a member of Pocock's party.

== Personal life ==
Together with Luke O'Keefe, Pocock ran a not-for-profit organisation, Eightytwenty Vision, that aims "to support maternal health, food and water security" in Zimbabwe. Registration of this charity with the Australian Charities and Not-for-profits Commission was voluntarily revoked in 2018.

David Pocock is married to Emma Palandri. The couple held a commitment ceremony in 2010 but officially signed marriage documents on 1 December 2018, after waiting for marriage equality to be legalised in Australia.

== Honours ==
=== Australia ===
- Tri Nations / The Rugby Championship: 2011, 2015
- Rugby World Cup third place: 2011, runner-up: 2015

== Notes ==
Parliament of Australia
| Preceded by Zed Seselja; Katy Gallagher | Senator for Australian Capital Territory; 2022–present With: Katy Gallagher | Succeeded by Incumbent |
Rugby Union Captain
| Preceded by Will Genia | Australian national rugby union captain 2012 | Succeeded by Ben Mowen |
