= George Gregan =

Australian rugby union player (born 1973)

George Gregan AM
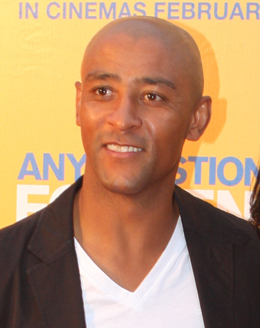
- Gregan in 2012
- Full name: George Musarurwa Gregan
- Born: 19 April 1973 (age 53) Lusaka, Zambia
- Height: 173 cm (5 ft 8 in)
- Weight: 80 kg (176 lb)
- School: St Edmund's College, Canberra
- University: University of Canberra

Rugby union career
Senior career
Years	Team	Apps	(Points)
2007–2008	Toulon	28	(10)
2008–2011	Suntory Sungoliath	33 (Note: It is not known how many appearances Gregan played for Suntory Sungoliath.)	(5)
2007–2011	Total	61	(15)
- Correct as of 29 January 2011
Super Rugby
Years	Team	Apps	(Points)
1996–2007	Brumbies	136	(117)
- Correct as of 5 May 2007
International career
Years	Team	Apps	(Points)
–1994	Australia U21		
1994–2007	Australia	139	(99)
- Correct as of 6 October 2007
Coaching career
- Years: Team
- 2012: Brumbies (Assistant coach)

George Musarurwa Gregan AM (born 19 April 1973) is a former rugby union player who played as scrum-half. Born in Lusaka, Zambia, Gregan represented Australia at an international level, and is Australia's second most capped player.

He played in the Super 12 for the Brumbies from the inception of that competition in 1996 through 2007, helping to lead them to overall victories in 2001 and 2004. He is a foundation Brumbies player and his career spanned both the amateur and professional eras. As a member of the Wallabies team, Gregan won the Rugby World Cup in 1999. His time as Australian captain included a Bledisloe Cup win in 2002 and an extra-time loss to England in the 2003 Rugby World Cup final. Gregan and his longtime Wallabies teammate, fly-half Stephen Larkham, also hold the all-time record for Test appearances by a halfback partnership with 79.

== Early and personal life ==
Gregan was born in Zambia to an Australian father and a Zimbabwean mother. His family moved to Australia when he was two years old. He grew up in Canberra where he was educated at St Edmund's College, and graduated with a Bachelor of Education (Physical Education) from the University of Canberra.

Gregan and his ex-wife Erica have three children, one of whom was diagnosed with epilepsy in 2004. This led to the Gregans setting up the George Gregan Foundation in 2005. After building 5 playgrounds in NSW, ACT and QLD hospitals and supporting the work of 18 neurology fellows, it wound down in 2020.

George married Caroline Brewin in March 2024 and now lives in between London and Melbourne.

== Rugby career ==
Gregan represented Australia at under-19 and under-21 level.

=== 1994 to 1999 ===
Gregan made his first appearance for the Wallabies in 1994 in a match against Italy in Brisbane, which the Wallabies won 23 to 20. He was subsequently capped in the victories over Italy again, and Western Samoa.

Later in 1994, Gregan made a famous try-saving tackle on All Black Jeff Wilson that directly led to Australia winning the Bledisloe Cup that year and is much remembered as one of the greatest moments in the Wallabies-All Blacks rivalry. After two caps against Argentina the following season, Gregan had so far been on the winning side in all of his international games as Australia entered the 1995 World Cup in South Africa as defending champions. However, Australia made their exit at the quarter finals, losing 25 to 22 to England at Newlands in Cape Town.

The game went professional post-1995 World Cup, and one outcome of this was the formation of the Super 12, of which Gregan became a foundation player for the ACT Brumbies franchise. That season Gregan appeared eight times for the Wallabies, including solid wins over both Wales and Canada in Brisbane, scoring a try in the Canadian clash. Another outcome of professionalism was the formation of the Tri Nations Series between Australia, New Zealand and South Africa. Gregan played in three of Australia's four fixtures at the first ever tournament, scoring a try in the 25 to 32 loss to the All Blacks in Brisbane.

During the mid-1990s' Super League war, Gregan was approached to be the starting halfback for the new Adelaide rugby league team for "seriously more money" than he would earn playing rugby union, but he opted to remain in the 15-man code.

Gregan was elevated to the vice-captaincy of the Wallabies in 1997. In the 1997 Tri Nations Series, Gregan scored a try in the opening game against the All Blacks, which was eventually lost 18 to 33, and the Wallabies won only one game, against South Africa, finishing at the bottom of the table. By the end of the year, Gregan was capped another four times.

After winning in two matches against the Irish, and one against England in the winter of 1999 at home, the Wallabies ended up finishing in the middle of the table for the 1999 Tri Nations Series (with Gregan having played in every match), though they were still favourable entering the 1999 World Cup held in Wales. Australia finished at the top of Pool E, winning all their games, with Gregan playing in the matches against Romania and Ireland, though he was rested in the final pool game against the USA. The Wallabies went on to defeat hosts Wales in the quarter finals at the new Millennium Stadium with Gregan scoring a try, putting Joe Roff into space and then taking the scoring pass, and enter the final after defeating defending champions South Africa in the semi-finals. The Wallabies became two-time World Champions after defeating France 35 to 12 in the final.

=== 2001 to 2005 ===
After the international retirement of John Eales in 2001, Gregan became the Wallabies captain. He was an obvious choice to fill the role, as it would be a natural progression from his position as vice-captain, as well as the fact that Gregan was a virtual automatic selection for the national team.

Gregan played in all of Australia's 6 matches at the 2003 Rugby World Cup. He landed an early drop goal in the 17 to 16 victory over Ireland in the pool stages. He also scored a try in the 33 to 16 win over Scotland in the quarter-finals. Gregan led the Wallabies in defeating the All Blacks in the semi-final; he taunted his opponents after defeating them with the comment, "Four more years boys, four more years boys" (that is, New Zealand would have to wait another 4 years for an attempt at winning the World Cup.) Australia lost to England in the final.

Following Australia's loss to the English in the World Cup, Gregan led the Wallabies on a massive winning campaign during the 2004 season. After defeating Scotland twice at home, the Wallabies faced the English in a World Cup replay in Brisbane, where they got their revenge, defeating England 51 to 15. Under Gregan, Australia lost just three matches in 2004, one against South Africa, one against New Zealand 16–7 in New Zealand and then against France in Paris. In July during the 2004 Tri Nations Series, Gregan ran out at Subiaco Oval in Perth against South Africa for his 100th Wallaby test. In October 2004, Gregan announced that his four-year-old son had epilepsy and has launched an epilepsy awareness campaign in Australia with the slogan 'Get on the Team'. He also took up the role of patron of Brainwave Australia.

Gregan missed a lot of the 2005 Super 12 season after breaking his leg during a game against the New South Wales Waratahs in Canberra. Gregan returned for the match against Italy in Melbourne, which the Wallabies won 61 to 29. Though after a win over the French and one over the Springboks, the Wallabies fell to the bottom of the 2005 Tri Nations Series table, losing all of their games. With his start in the final match of the 2005 Tri Nations at Eden Park in Auckland against the All Blacks, Gregan equalled England's Jason Leonard as the most-capped player for a national team in Test rugby, with 114 (Leonard also has five Lions caps). Appropriately, when Australia made their entrance for that match, Gregan went out on the field by himself before any of his teammates entered the pitch.

On 5 November 2005, he earned his 115th cap, surpassing Leonard, when he led out the Wallabies at Stade Vélodrome in Marseille against France. The Wallabies lost the match 16 to 26. The French loss was followed by a meeting with the English at Twickenham, where England's superior scrummaging saw them also win 26 to 16.

=== 2006 ===
In June 2006, the Wallabies, under new coach John Connolly, completed a solid win over England. Gregan came off the bench in the second half of the second Test in Melbourne as he earned his 120th international cap - setting a new world record.

After the matches against the English and Irish the Wallabies entered the 2006 Tri Nations Series. Two weeks later the All Blacks came to Brisbane for the Bledisloe Cup clash, in which Gregan equalled John Eales' record for most caps as captain of Australia, which is 55. In the subsequent match against South Africa in Sydney, Gregan passed Eales' record, becoming the most capped Australian captain of all time. The Wallabies managed to scrape home 20 to 18. For the 2006 European Tour, Gregan was rested and Matt Giteau was given a chance at halfback.

=== 2007 ===
On 22 March 2007, the French Top 14 club Toulon announced that it had signed Gregan to a contract for the 2007–08 season. He arrived in France after the 2007 Rugby World Cup, and was reportedly paid €400,000 for the season.

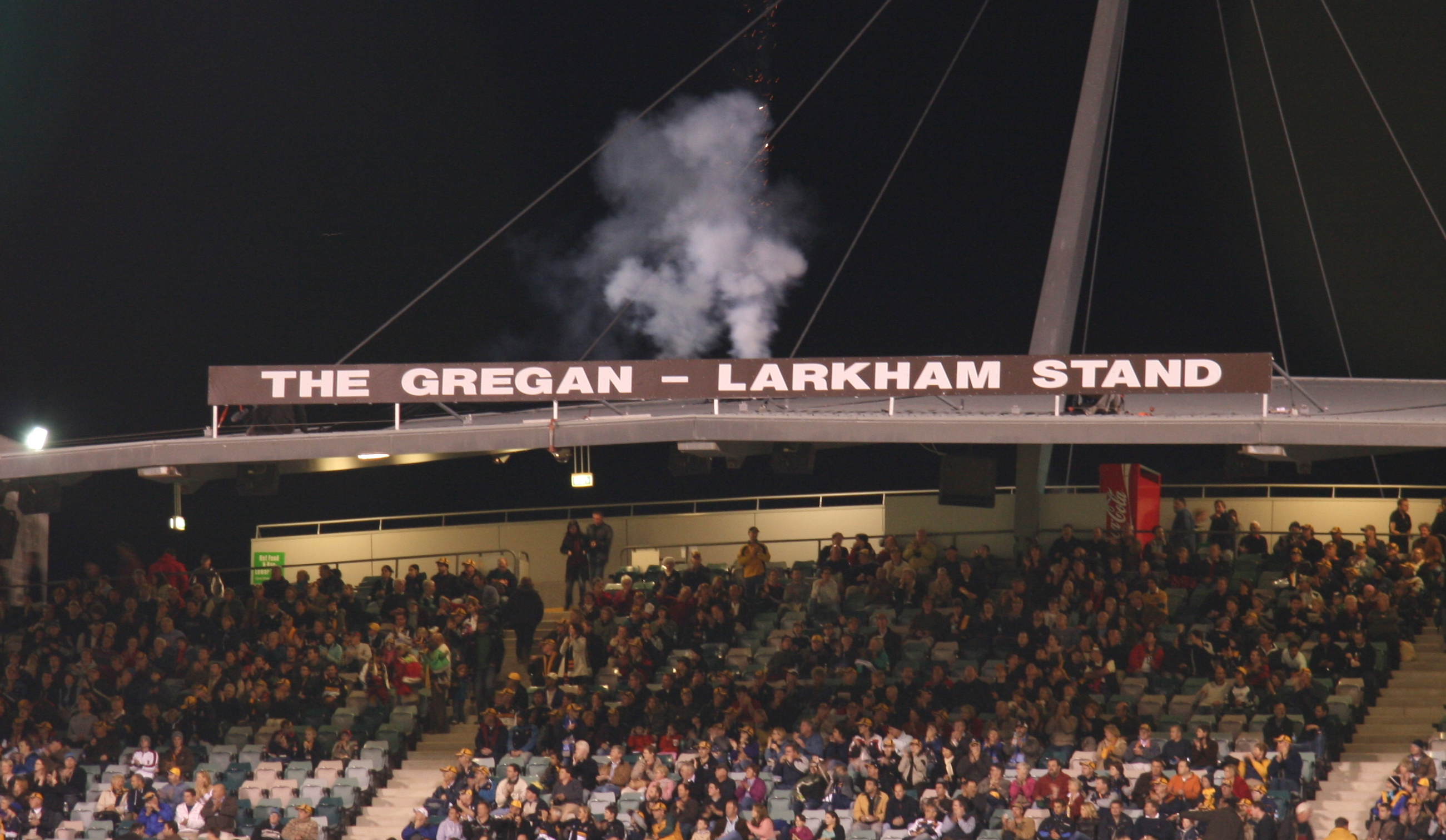
The Gregan - Larkham Grandstand at Canberra Stadium

Gregan played his last home game with the Brumbies on 28 April 2007; leading his team to a victory over the Canterbury Crusaders. Fittingly, this was also the last home game for his teammate Stephen Larkham. The two were farewelled with the announcement that a stand at Canberra Stadium would be named after them.

Gregan was again selected as part of the Wallabies squad for the 2007 home tests against Wales and Fiji and the Tri-Nations Series, although he was no longer the Captain of the team and was on the reserves bench behind Matt Giteau for the Tests against Wales. Gregan did regain his starting spot for the first Tri-Nations game against South Africa, showing his class and longevity. The Wallabies' co-Captains were Phil Waugh and Stirling Mortlock but Waugh was dropped to the bench during the Tri-Nations in place of Gregan's Brumbies teammate George Smith, elevating Mortlock to the captaincy.

In June 2007, Greg Growden, Chief Rugby Correspondent for the Sydney Morning Herald said that "several high-ranking Australian Rugby Union sources told the Herald that Gregan was the "raging hot favourite" to be Australia's World Cup captain" However, when the World Cup squad was announced, Mortlock was named Captain, whilst Waugh and Gregan were named vice captains.

In the 2007 Rugby World Cup - Pool B match against Fiji, he equalled Will Carling's record of captaining an international side for 59 times and in the 2009 Tri Nations Series Springbok John Smit equalled and beaten his (as well as Carling) record in tests between New Zealand in Bloemfontein and Durban respectively. On 6 October 2007, Gregan played his final match for the Wallabies in the quarter-final against England, where they suffered a narrow 12–10 defeat.

=== Post-Australia ===
On 18 June 2008, it was announced that he had joined Suntory Sungoliath in Japan, following a season at RC Toulonnais in the French Top 14.

In 2011, Gregan announced his retirement from professional rugby.

== Post-playing retirement ==
In 2012, Gregan was assistant coach at the Brumbies. In 2014, Gregan joined the Fox-Sports Rugby commentator team, along with his former Wallabies teammate John Eales.

Pitch-side at the Hong Kong Sevens in March 2014, former Ireland and British and Irish Lions captain Brian O'Driscoll and former Australia captain Stephen Larkham demonstrated their skills to Bloomberg TV Anchor John Dawson.

=== GG's Espresso/Gregan Group ===
In the late 1990s, Gregan and his ex-wife had started planning for his post-playing career. Formulating plans for a coffee shop business, in 1998 he counted and then surveyed commuters at Wynyard station. The first GG's Espresso shop opened in 1999, and presently there are 9 GG's Espresso cafes across Sydney and Brisbane. These form the basis of a wider food and hospitality business, The Gregan Group, which turned over Aus$10M and employs 280 people.

== Honours ==
Brumbies

- Super Rugby: 2001, 2004

Toulon

- Rugby Pro D2: 2007–08

Suntory Sungoliath

- All-Japan Rugby Football Championship: 2010–11

Australia

- World Cup: 1999
- Tri-Nations: 2000, 2001
- Bledisloe Cup: 1994, 1998, 1999, 2000, 2001, 2002

General

- Appointed as a member of the Order of Australia in June 2004 for his services to Rugby Union Football and in particular as the Captain of the Wallabies.
- Inducted into the Sport Australia Hall of Fame in 2009.
- Inducted into the World Rugby Hall of Fame (then known as the IRB Hall of Fame) in 2013.
- Inaugural inductee to University of Canberra Sport Walk of Fame.

== See also ==
- List of rugby union Test caps leaders
- Top League Japan rugby
- Wallaby Team of the Decade

== Notes ==
Preceded by Jason Little	Australian national rugby union captain 2001-2004	Succeeded by Chris Whitaker
