= George Smith (rugby union) =

Australian rugby union player (born 1980)

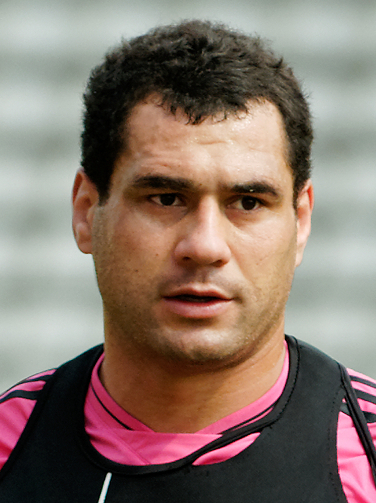
- Smith during a Stade Français training session
- Born: 14 July 1980 (age 46) Manly, Australia
- Height: 180 cm (5 ft 11 in)
- Weight: 103 kg (227 lb; 16 st 3 lb)
- School: Cromer Campus
- Notable relative: Tyrone Smith (brother)
- Occupation: Retired rugby player

Rugby union career
- Position(s): Flanker, Number 8
Senior career
Years	Team	Apps	(Points)
1999–2013	Brumbies	142	(90)
2010–2011	Toulon	30	(5)
2011–2017	Suntory Sungoliath	67	(87)
2012	Stade Français	8	(5)
2014–2015	Lyon OU	25	(15)
2015–2016	Wasps	26	(5)
2017–2018	Queensland Reds	22	(10)
2018–2019	Bristol	23	(0)
- Correct as of 21 May 2019
International career
Years	Team	Apps	(Points)
2000–2013	Australia	111	(45)
2009–2015	Barbarian F.C.	6	(10)
- Correct as of 21 May 2019

George Smith AM (born 14 July 1980) is an Australian former rugby union player. He was a flanker for 12 years at the ACT Brumbies in Super Rugby, earning 142 caps.

He made his test debut in 2000 against France in Paris and earnt 111 caps for Australia, 110 before retiring from international rugby on 5 February 2010 and one final cap against the British & Irish Lions on 6 July 2013. He is the fifth most capped Wallaby forward behind James Slipper, Stephen Moore, Michael Hooper and Nathan Sharpe. He is also the fourth most capped flanker in international rugby union behind Richie McCaw, Michael Hooper and Alessandro Zanni.

== Early life and junior career ==
Smith was born in Manly, Sydney. He had a successful school rugby career, first at Balgowlah Boys High School, then at Cromer High School, along with Tongan international John Payne, he won the Australian Schools Championship. He played for the Australian Schoolboys team in 1998.

Smith's junior club rugby was with the Manly Roos/Warringah Roos, before moving on to play the majority of his junior career with the Manly Vikings, playing a year above his age group in the Sydney junior rugby competition. Once that team had reached its age limit (18 years old) and moved on to the Colts competition, Smith remained in the Sydney junior rugby competition, this time lining up in his correct age group for the Seaforth-Balgowlah Raiders. He then progressed to playing in the Manly 1st grade Colts side who also won a premiership in 1999. It was during that season that Smith made his first grade debut at Nepean Rugby Park against The Penrith Emus. During his junior career he was selected for many representative teams, including Manly, Sydney, Northern Zone, NSW, and Australian Under 16s.

== Senior career ==
=== Brumbies and Australia: 2000–2010 ===
He was signed to the ACT Brumbies by Eddie Jones in 1999. He made his Super 12 debut in just his first year of professional rugby in 2000, playing against the Sharks, and he scored a try in the Brumbies Super 12 final loss to the Canterbury Crusaders. In a remarkable year, Smith was also capped for the first time in the Wallabies end of season tour against France.

Smith was a key player for the Wallabies from 2000 to 2009. He was often voted Players' Player of the Year, awarded for fair-play by his teammates and officials. He has recently been chosen as a member of the Wallaby Team of the Decade, a remarkable feat considering his age and one of only three current players picked. In 2002, he was the first recipient of the John Eales Medal, awarded by the Australian Rugby Union and the Rugby Union Players' Association to their Player of the Year.

He won Australian Super 14 Player of the Year four years in a row between 2006 and 2009.

In 2007, the breakdown specialist capped off another remarkable season claiming awards including: the Brett Robinson Award as the Brumbies' Players' Player for the fifth consecutive year; Super 14 Player of the Year; and the Rugby Union Players' Association 'Rugby Medal for Excellence'. These recognitions underlined his position as one of rugby's most respected players, reinforced further when he became the Wallabies 75th captain, against Canada at the 2007 Rugby World Cup.

2008 was a big year for Smith. He captained the Brumbies and the Wallabies and became the first player to win the John Eales Medal, twice. In addition, Smith won the "Super 14 Player of the Year Award", for the third consecutive year and the Brett Robinson Award as the Brumbies' Players' Player of the year for the sixth consecutive year.

He also reached a personal milestone during the season, when he made his 100th Super Rugby appearance against the Cheetahs in round six. In a memorable double for the Smith family, George's younger brother, Brumbies teammate Tyrone, was named rookie of the year. In the international arena, the older Smith also became both the most capped flanker and the most capped forward – the latter being previously held by John Eales.

On 5 February 2010, Smith announced his retirement from international rugby. 2010 was expected to be his last in Super Rugby. Smith celebrated with the achievement of his 9th Brumbies Players' Player of the Year, with eight of those awards being consecutive.

=== Toulon, Stade Français and Suntory: 2011–2013 ===
In June 2010, Smith signed a one-year contract with French Top 14 club Toulon. His RC Toulonnais teammates included former Highlander and All Black prop Carl Hayman, and former Brumbies' scrum-half Matt Henjak. Later in 2010 he was selected in the French Barbarians to play at blindside flanker (number 6) against Tonga.

Smith played for the Australia XV team alongside fellow Tongan, Lisiate Tafa, in the Southern Hemisphere Charity Fundraiser in March 2011 against the Pacific Barbarians. In the following month Smith become the highest paid Australian rugby player by signing with Japanese club, Suntory Sungoliath, on a $3.3 million three-year deal.

He joined Stade Français in 2012 on a short-term contract for the end of their Top 14 and European Challenge Cup seasons.

=== Brumbies and Lions Series: 2013 ===
In early 2013 the Brumbies announced that Smith would return to Australia on a short-term contract for the 2013 Super Rugby season. This followed Ita Vaea's season-ending injury. Smith gained the approval of his Japanese club Sungoliath for his 12-week stint back in Australia.

Smith was recalled to the Australian squad in June that year for the series against the British & Irish Lions, after recovering from a knee injury. After being overlooked for the second test, Smith was named as the starting open side flanker for the third and deciding test in Sydney. It was his first test since retiring from international rugby in February 2010 and broke Colin Meads' record of 4382 days between his first test against the Lions, and his last.

=== Lyon and Wasps: 2014–2016 ===
After leaving French club Lyon on their relegation to the Pro D2, Smith made a move to England to sign for Wasps in the Aviva Premiership from the 2015–16 season. During his season with Wasps, Smith won a number of awards; including Wasps' Players' Player of the Year, Wasps' Player of the Year, Aviva Premiership Players' Player of the Year and Green Flag Forward of the Season. During his spell in England, Smith was also involved in the England coaching setup during the 2016 Six Nations Championship

=== Queensland Reds and Suntory: 2016–2018 ===
In mid 2016 it was confirmed that Smith would leave Wasps in England to return to Japanese club Suntory Sungoliath, and that he would also play for the Queensland Reds in the 2017 and 2018 Super Rugby seasons.

On 13 July 2018, Smith played his final home game for Queensland Reds, having initially been ruled out with a knee injury. This was his final professional game in Australia.

=== Bristol: 2018–2019 ===
Smith joined the Bristol Bears in England for their 2018–19 Premiership Rugby season. He retired from professional rugby at the end of that season.

== Personal life ==
Smith, who is of Tongan background, is the older brother of fellow Brumbies player and Tongan rugby league international Tyrone Smith.

He was easily recognised on the field by his dreadlocked hair style until late 2006 – when he decided to sell his dreadlocks for charity. They were given to a charity for younger people with cancer.

Smith was the face of the Australian version of Electronic Arts' video game Rugby 2005.

== Honours and awards ==
Smith was appointed a Member of the Order of Australia in 2012. In 2023, Smith was inducted into the World Rugby Hall of Fame. In 2024, he was an inaugural inductee into the Pasifika Rugby Hall of Fame. In 2025, he was inducted into ACT Sport Hall of Fame as an Athlete Member.

== See also ==
- List of 2012–13 Super Rugby transfers
- Wallaby Team of the Decade
- Super Rugby

== Bibliography ==
- Guinness, Rupert (2011). George Smith: The Biography. Allen & Unwin. ISBN 9781742374345.

Preceded by Inaugural award	John Eales Medal; 2002, 2008	Succeeded by Phil Waugh

Preceded by Stirling Mortlock	Australian national rugby union captain 2007–2009	Succeeded by Rocky Elsom
