= Marika Koroibete =

Australia international rugby union & Fiji international rugby league footballer

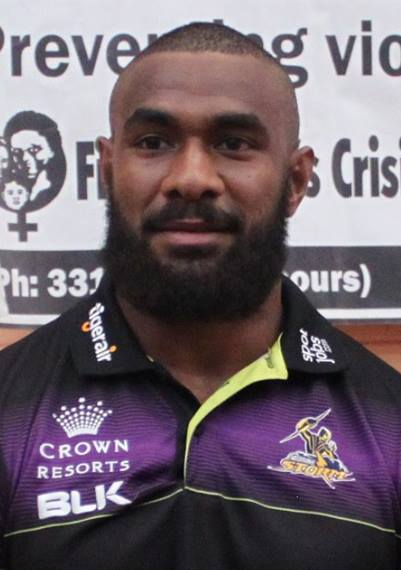

Personal information
- Full name: Ratu Marika Koroibete
- Born: 26 July 1992 (age 34) Naraiyawa, Fiji
- Height: 180 cm (5 ft 11 in)
- Weight: 93 kg (14 st 9 lb; 205 lb)

Playing information

Rugby league
- Position: Wing
Club
Years	Team	Pld	T	G	FG	P
2012–14	Wests Tigers	16	12	0	0	48
2014–16	Melbourne Storm	58	34	0	0	136
	Total	74	46	0	0	184
Representative
Years	Team	Pld	T	G	FG	P
2013–15	Fiji	7	2	0	0	8

Rugby union
- Position: Wing
Club
Years	Team	Pld	T	G	FG	P
2017–21	Rebels	69	23	0	0	115
2017	Melbourne Rising	1	2	0	0	10
2021–26	Panasonic Wild Knights	68	31	0	0	155
	Total	138	56	0	0	280
Representative
Years	Team	Pld	T	G	FG	P
2016	Australia XV	1	0	0	0	0
2017–24	Australia	63	20	0	0	100
- Source: As of 10 May 2026

Marika Koroibete (born 26 July 1992) is a dual-code international rugby league and rugby union footballer. He played for the Australia national rugby union team, and currently plays for the Ospreys.

Koroibete previously played rugby league for the Melbourne Storm and Wests Tigers in the NRL, and was a member of the Fiji national rugby league team.

== Early years ==
Born in Naraiyawa, Fiji, Koroibete grew up on a remote family farm. Koroibete started his career playing for Nasinu Secondary School in rugby union in Fiji.

After a short stint in junior rugby league, Koroibete signed a 3-year contract with the Wests Tigers to play in Australia, initially in the Toyota Cup national under-20 competition. He was signed after being spotted playing for the Fiji Under 19s in a match against Australian-born Fijian players. Koroibete had also been considering pursuing a career in sprinting, having run 100 metres in 10.75 seconds.

He played for the Tigers' Toyota Cup team in 2011 and 2012, scoring 22 tries in 26 games. He scored two tries as the team won the 2012 Grand Final. 2012 Toyota Cup coach Todd Payten said, "The most exciting part with Marika is that we're only really scratching the surface. He's got a couple of little issues and once we iron them out, he's certainly going to be a crowd pleaser."

== Rugby league career ==
=== Wests Tigers ===
In Round 21 of 2012, Koroibete made his NRL debut on the wing for the Wests Tigers against the South Sydney Rabbitohs in the Tigers 32–6 loss. In just his second game in Round 22, Koroibete scored 4 tries for the Tigers against the 51–26 win Parramatta Eels at Campbelltown Stadium, equalling the club record for most tries in a match set by Kevin McGuinness 10 years earlier. Koroibete then followed up with 2 tries against the Canterbury-Bankstown Bulldogs a fortnight later.

Coach Tim Sheens described him as having, "lots of issues still but he's got raw pace and ability." Koroibete finished his debut year in the NRL playing in 6 matches and scored 7 tries. On 21 August 2012, Koroibete was named at wing in the 2012 Toyota Cup Team of the Year. Koroibete was also named the joint Rookie of the Year for the Wests Tigers, and one of the top ten upcoming youngsters in the NRL in Lifestyle Uncut Magazine.

A number of injuries, including a fractured eye-socket and a dislocated elbow, saw Koroibete play in just 9 games in 2013. However, he scored 5 tries and was averaging over three tackle breaks and 100 metres with the ball per game.

In February, Koroibete was included in the Wests Tigers inaugural 2014 Auckland Nines squad, despite having a problem with his visa to gain entry into New Zealand.

=== Melbourne Storm ===
Koroibete joined the Melbourne Storm mid-season on a 2 1/2-year contract effective from 23 June 2014. In Round 18 against the Canterbury-Bankstown Bulldogs, Koroibete made his debut for the Melbourne Storm replacing Sisa Waqa on the wing in the Storm's 6–4 loss. In the next match in Round 19 against the Canberra Raiders at AAMI Park, Koroibete scored his first club try in the 28–14 win. Koroibete played in 10 matches and scored 6 tries for the Storm in 2014 after his mid-year transfer to the club.

He finished the 2015 season as the Storms' highest try-scorer with 16 tries in 23 matches. Koroibete also played for the Storm at the NRL Auckland Nines in 2015, and 2016. In May 2016, it was confirmed that he would switch codes to play rugby union at the end of the 2016 NRL season.

== Rugby union career ==
=== Melbourne Rebels ===
Koriobete accepted a contract offer to join Super Rugby side the Melbourne Rebels for the 2017 season. The offer allowed him to play for the Rebels as well as for the Australia national team, for whom he had already qualified under the four-year residency rule.

=== Super Rugby statistics ===
As of 12 June 2021

Season	Team	Games	Starts	Sub	Min	T	C	PG	DG	Pts	YC	RC
2017	Rebels	13	13	0	1040	6	0	0	0	30	0	0
2018	Rebels	13	12	1	924	4	0	0	0	20	0	0
2019	Rebels	15	13	2	1017	6	0	0	0	30	0	0
2020	Rebels	6	6	0	480	2	0	0	0	10	1	0
2020 AU	Rebels	9	9	0	685	3	0	0	0	15	0	0
2021 AU	Rebels	8	8	0	628	0	0	0	0	0	1	0
2021 TT	Rebels	5	5	0	400	2	0	0	0	10	0	0
Total		69	66	3	5174	23	0	0	0	115	2	0

== International career ==
=== Rugby league: Fiji ===
Koroibete made his international debut for Fiji at the 2013 World Cup, as Fiji defeated Ireland 32–14. He played in all five of Fiji's games. In the match against Samoa, he made seven tackle breaks and ran over 220 metres with the ball.

The following year Koroibete was selected to play for Fiji in the 2014 Pacific Test against Samoa. He played on the wing in the 32–16 loss at Penrith Stadium.

On 2 May 2015, he played for Fiji against Papua New Guinea in the 2015 Melanesian Cup, playing on the wing. He scored 2 tries in a Man of the Match performance in Fiji's 22–10 victory at Cbus Super Stadium.

=== Rugby union: Australia ===
In October 2016, just weeks after playing in the 2016 NRL Grand Final, Koroibete was named in the Wallabies squad for their end-of-year tour to Europe. He did not play in the test matches but gained his first appearance playing for the Australia XV side against the French Barbarians team in Bordeaux.

Koroibete made his test debut for Australia against Argentina at Canberra on 16 September 2017.

Koroibete is a two-time winner of the John Eales Medal, winning the award in 2019 and 2022.
