= Phil Waugh =

Australia international rugby union player

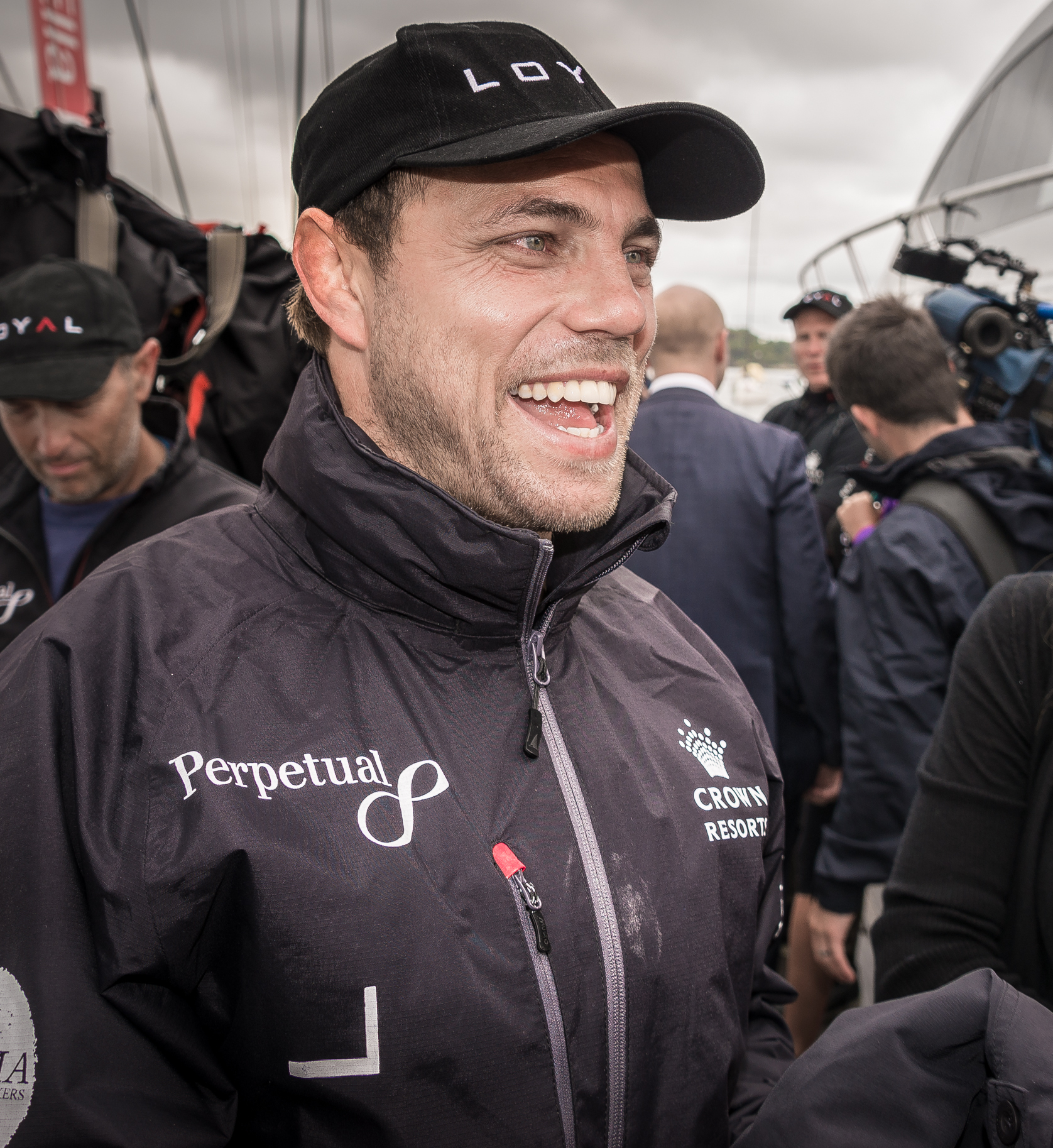
- Waugh in 2014
- Born: 22 September 1979 (age 47) Sydney, New South Wales, Australia
- Height: 5 ft 11 in (180 cm)
- Weight: 99 kg (15 st 8 lb; 218 lb)
- School: Shore School
- University: University of Sydney

Rugby union career
- Position: Flanker
Senior career
Years	Team	Apps	(Points)
1999–2011	Waratahs	136	(65)
- Correct as of 7 March 2011
International career
Years	Team	Apps	(Points)
1996–1997	Australian Schoolboys	1	(0)
2000–2009	Australia	79	(20)
- Correct as of 9 March 2010
Medal record
Men's rugby union
Representing Australia
Rugby World Cup
Silver medal – second place	2003 Australia	Squad

Phillip Waugh (born 22 September 1979) is the chief executive of Rugby Australia (RA) and a former rugby union footballer who played 136 matches in the Super Rugby for the New South Wales Waratahs, and in 79 Test matches for the Wallabies. His usual position was openside flanker.

== Playing career ==
Waugh's career as a rugby player began at the Shore school, playing in the First XV in his final 3 years and captaining the team in 1997. He was selected to represent the Australian Schoolboys team in 1996 and 1997, captaining the team in 1997.

His professional career began in 1999, playing for the Waratahs, and the following year gained selection for the Wallabies Spring tour of the UK and Europe, making his test debut as a replacement in the match against England. Waugh continued receiving game time with the team until early 2002 when an ankle injury caused him to miss out on the international season.

After his recovery, Waugh returned to the field to be named vice-captain of the 2003 Rugby World Cup team, who were ultimately runners-up. He was rewarded for his performance in 2003 by winning the John Eales Medal for the Wallabies Best and Fairest Player.

Waugh was named captain of the Waratahs in 2007 but was injured for most of the Super 14 season. Rocky Elsom and Adam Freier deputized in his absence. During the 2008 Super 14 season, he led the Waratahs from second last (2007 result) to second on the ladder.

== Post-playing career ==
=== Sailing ===
In December 2013, Waugh was a crew member aboard racing supermaxi yacht Perpetual Loyal in the 2013 Sydney to Hobart Yacht Race, with his other celebrity crew members, Karl Stefanovic, Larry Emdur, Tom Slingsby, Jude Bolton and Guillaume Brahimi.

=== Rugby Australia ===
In June 2023, Waugh was appointed chief executive of Rugby Australia. He previously had been a non-executive director on the Rugby Australia board since July 2018, and worked at National Australia Bank as an executive of broker distribution.

== Honours ==
- 2010 Waratahs Best forward award
- 2009 Waratahs Best forward award
- 2008 Waratahs Best Forward award
- 2004 Matthew Burke Cup – Waratahs Players' Player
- 2003 John Eales Medal

== See also ==
- Australian Rugby Shield
- Wallaby Team of the Decade

Preceded by George Smith	John Eales Medal; 2003	Succeeded by David Lyons

Preceded by Nathan Sharpe	Australian national rugby union captain 2006–2007	Succeeded by Stirling Mortlock
