= Tony Dempsey (rugby union) =

- Full name: Anthony Francis Dempsey
- Born: 12 February 1966 (age 60) Sydney, Australia
- School: Saint Ignatius' College
- University: Macquarie University
- Notable relative: Jack Dempsey (nephew)
- Occupation: Lawyer

Rugby union career
- Position: Loose forward
International career
Years	Team	Apps	(Points)
1993	Australia		

Anthony Francis Dempsey (born 12 February 1966) is an Australian former rugby union player.

Dempsey grew up in Sydney and picked up rugby union at Saint Ignatius' College, where he was a 1st XV captain in 1983 and 1984. He also captained the 1984 Australian Schools side.

While undertaking further studies at Macquarie University, Dempsey began playing rugby for Gordon, debuting in first-grade while still a teenager. He twice won Gordon's best and fairest award, then left in 1988 for Warringah, where he would spend three seasons. Returning to Gordon, Dempsey was a back-rower in the club's 1992 premiership team.

Dempsey featured in the New South Wales side that beat the touring 1993 Springboks and gained Wallabies selection for their end-of-season tour, consisting of Test matches against Canada, France and the USA. He made his Wallabies debut against Canada "A" in Calgary but didn't play any of the North American internationals, then once the tour moved to France suffered a fractured jaw that meant he had to fly home without winning a cap.

A lawyer by profession, Dempsey was the founding President of the Rugby Union Players' Association in 1995 and later served nine years as CEO. He was awarded the Australian Sports Medal in 2000.
