= Nathan Sharpe =

Australian rugby union player

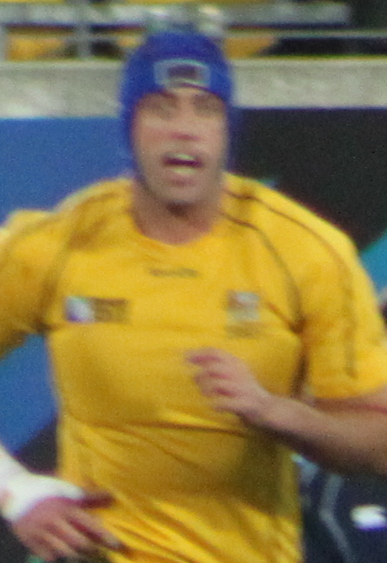
- Nathan Sharpe, circa 2011
- Born: Nathan Charles Sharpe; 26 February 1978 (age 48) Wagga Wagga, New South Wales, Australia
- Height: 200 cm (6 ft 7 in)
- Weight: 115 kg (18 st 2 lb)
- School: The Southport School

Rugby union career
- Position: Lock
Super Rugby
Years	Team	Apps	(Points)
1998–2005	Reds	70	(25)
2006–2012	Force	92	(15)
- Correct as of 20 July 2012
International career
Years	Team	Apps	(Points)
2002–2012	Australia	116	(40)
1997–1999	Australia U21		
1996	Australia U19		
- Correct as of 1 December 2012
Medal record
Men's rugby union
Representing Australia
Rugby World Cup
Silver medal – second place	2003 Australia	Squad
Bronze medal – third place	2011 New Zealand	Squad

Nathan Sharpe (born 26 February 1978) is a retired professional Australian rugby union player. He began his rugby career at the Queensland Reds in 1999 before joining the newly created Western Force in 2006, where he captained the club until his retirement in 2012. He played 116 test matches for Australia, including 20 as captain. His usual position was lock.

== Early life ==
Sharpe was raised in the Riverina city of Wagga Wagga, New South Wales and his first sporting love was Australian rules football. He started playing rugby union upon moving to the Gold Coast, Queensland at age 11. At schoolboy level, he represented The Southport School first XV and first VIII Rowing Team in 1994 and 1995 as well as being the schools School Captain. During 1996, Sharpe played for the under-19 Australian rugby union team. He was selected for the Australian under-21s national side for three years in a row from 1997 to 1999, captaining the team in 1999.

== Rugby career ==
At the age of 18, Sharpe was chosen in the Queensland Reds senior squad for the 1996 Super 12 competition. It was the first year of professional rugby and the team included Wallabies John Eales and Garrick Morgan. He had to wait until 1998 to make his Queensland debut. Sharpe gained his first cap for Australia against France in Melbourne in 2002. He passed the 50-cap mark during 2006 with a remarkable sequence of Test appearances: when he was rested for the Test against Fiji in Perth in June 2007 it ended a run of 28 consecutive matches for the Wallabies since 2005.

For the 2006 season the Super 12 competition was expanded to become the Super 14 with the addition of two new teams; the Western Force in Perth, and the Cheetahs in Bloemfontein. Sharpe was recruited by the Force, and became their inaugural team captain. In 2007, Sharpe's outstanding work in the line-out and effective work around the field was recognised when he was awarded the John Eales Medal as Australia's Player of the Year. He earned his 100th Test cap against Wales at the 2011 Rugby World Cup, where Australia finished in third place. After the following Super Rugby season, Sharpe retired from the game. He was persuaded to stay on, however, for the Wallabies matches in the 2012 Rugby Championship and the 2012 end-of-year tour. Sharpe's presence in the second row took on added importance in the absence of the injured James Horwill, and he captained the side for the remainder of the year. Sharpe won the John Eales Medal for a second time in 2012. His final match playing for Australia was a win against Wales at Millennium Stadium on 1 December 2012.

== Post playing ==
Sharpe is currently a commentator for Network Ten for international games involving Australia. Nathan also works for labour hire company SES Labour Solutions.

Nathan is married to ex-Sydney Swifts netball player, Samantha Sharpe (née Dennis).

Preceded by Chris Whitaker	Australian national rugby union captain 2004–2012	Succeeded by Phil Waugh
