= John Eales =

Australian rugby union player

John Eales AM
- Born: John Anthony Eales; 27 June 1970 (age 56) Brisbane, Queensland, Australia
- Height: 200 cm (6 ft 7 in)
- Weight: 119 kg (18 st 10 lb; 262 lb)
- School: Marist College, Ashgrove
- University: University of Queensland

Rugby union career
- Position(s): Lock, Number 8
Amateur team(s)
Years	Team	Apps	(Points)
1989–1999	Brothers		
Provincial / State sides
Years	Team	Apps	(Points)
1990–2001	Queensland	112	
Super Rugby
Years	Team	Apps	(Points)
1996–2001	Queensland Reds	42	(402)
International career
Years	Team	Apps	(Points)
1991–2001	Australia	86	(173)

John Anthony Eales AM (born 27 June 1970) is an Australian former rugby union player and the most successful captain in the history of Australian rugby. In 1999, he became one of the first players to win multiple Rugby World Cups.

== Early life ==
Eales went to school at Marist College Ashgrove, in Ashgrove. In his youth, Eales was a cricket all-rounder and played first grade cricket for Queensland University in the Brisbane QCA cricket competition. Eales completed a Bachelor of Arts degree with a double major in psychology from the University of Queensland in 1991 prior to taking to the international rugby stage.

== Rugby career ==
Eales played lock for Queensland Reds and Australia. He was given the nickname "Nobody" because "Nobody's perfect".

Eales' 55-cap time as captain marked an era of Australian success in world rugby. Eales played a part in Australia's victories at the Rugby World Cup, first in 1991, and later in 1999. He took over the captaincy from Phil Kearns.

=== Statistics ===
Eales scored 173 points for Australia – 2 tries (one valued at 4, one at 5), 34 penalties and 31 conversions – a total which, as of April 2013, places him 12th on the all-time scoring list for Australia. He is the highest scoring forward in Test rugby history and, as of November 2015, only one of eight forwards to have surpassed 100 points in Test rugby (the others being Richie McCaw, Jean Prat, Takashi Kikutani, Colin Charvis, Mamuka Gorgodze, Ardie Savea and Carlo Checchinato). This is largely because of his goal kicking, which is unusual for a forward; his two tries are unremarkable (in comparison, all of Checchinato's, Charvis's and McCaw's points have come from tries).

Eales captained Australia on 60 occasions, 55 times in Test matches, making him the second most capped Wallaby captain after George Gregan (59). As of 2017, he is ranked seventh in games played as international captain. As of 2017, Eales' 86 caps make him the fourth most capped forward in Australia's Test rugby history, and joint 9th on the overall list.

Eales played 20 Tests against the All Blacks, winning 11 and losing 9. Of those 20 Tests, he captained the Wallabies 11 times, winning 6 and losing 5. Eales is one of only 21 players to have represented the Queensland Reds in 100 or more state games – he represented his state in 112 games. He scored a total of 402 points in the Super 12 competition with 6 tries, 66 conversions and 80 penalties for the Queensland Reds. No forward has scored more points than him in the competition's history.

He is one of a select group to have won the Rugby World Cup twice.

He retired as the most-capped lock of all time, with 84 Test appearances in that position (his other two Tests were as a number eight). Eales has since been surpassed in caps as a lock by several players.

== Post-playing career ==
=== Business ===
Eales was a founder of the Mettle Group and his personal company the JohnEales5. He is also a director of Flight Centre Travel Group and Magellan Financial Group and has been a columnist for The Australian newspaper. He is also engaged as a consultant for Westpac. He is also a non-executive director at Fuji Xerox.

=== Sport ambassador, mentor and boards ===
Eales acted as a "rugby ambassador" at the 2007 Rugby World Cup in France, which involved a number of media duties and fulfilled the role as an Athlete Liaison Officer for the Australian Olympic Committee in the Athens, Beijing and 2012 London Olympics.

He is also an Ambassador for the Australian Indigenous Education Foundation, Hearts in Union and the Melanoma Institute Australia.

Together with Bond University, he presents the annual John Eales Rugby Excellence Scholarship which includes one-on-one mentoring with Eales.

=== Author ===
Eales has written two books, Learning From Legends, Sport, and a Business version.

=== Academia ===
Eales is an occasional lecturer at University of Notre Dame.

== Personal life ==
Politically, Eales supported Australia's becoming a republic in the runup to the 1999 Australian republic referendum.

Eales' son, Elijah Eales, plays for the Mosman Cricket Club in Sydney Grade Cricket.

== Honours ==
- Eales was named the 2002 Queenslander of the Year.
- The annual award for the best Australian rugby union player is known as The John Eales Medal, John Eales Medal.
- In 1999 he was made a Member of the Order of Australia (AM) for services to the community and rugby.
- On 30 August 2000, he was awarded the Australian Sports Medal for his contribution to Australian Rugby.
- In 2001, he was inducted into the Australian Institute of Sport 'Best of the Best'.
- Eales was inducted into the Sport Australia Hall of Fame in 2003.
- In 2007, he was inducted into the International Rugby Board Hall of Fame.
- Eales was inducted to the Wallaby Hall of Fame in 2011.
- Eales was awarded Legend status in the Sport Australia Hall of Fame in 2020.
- In 2025, he was an inaugural inductee of the Stadium Australia Hall of Fame.

Rugby Union Captain
Preceded by Phil Kearns	Australia rugby union captains 1996–2001	Succeeded by George Gregan
Preceded by Francois Pienaar (South Africa)	IRB World Cup winning captain 1999	Succeeded by Martin Johnson (England)
