= Ling (surname) =

Ling is a surname which can be of either Chinese, English, or Nordic origin.

== Chinese ==
"Ling" is the Roman alphabet spelling of multiple Chinese surnames.

=== Líng (凌) ===
According to traditional stories, the surname pronounced Líng (凌) in Mandarin originated during the Zhou dynasty as an occupational surname for a court official responsible for the storage and handling of ice. King Wu of Zhou's brother Kang Shu had a son who held this post, and Kang Shu's descendants later adopted Líng as their surname.

- Ling Cao (凌操, died 203), Eastern Han dynasty military officer serving under the warlords Sun Ce and Sun Quan
- Ling Tong (凌統, 189–217), Eastern Han dynasty military officer, son of Ling Cao
- Ling Mengchu (凌濛初, 1580–1644), Ming dynasty writer
- Ling Shuhua (凌叔华, 1900–1990), Chinese modernist writer
- Ling Yun (politician) (凌云, 1917–2018), first Minister of State Security of the People's Republic of China
- Gilbert Ling (凌寧, 1919–2019), Chinese-born American biologist
- Ling Qing (凌青, 1923–2010), Chinese diplomat
- Ivy Ling Po (凌波, born 1939), Hong Kong actress
- Ling Li (writer) (凌力, 1942–2018), Chinese writer and historian
- Ling Jing-huan (凌鏡寰, fl. 1950s), Taiwanese basketball player
- James Sik Hung Ling (凌錫洪, 1951–2001), Hong Kong Salvation Army pastor
- Laura Ling (凌志美, born 1976), American journalist
- Lisa Ling (凌志慧, born 1973), American journalist, television presenter, and author
- Ling Yong (凌勇, born 1978), Chinese Paralympic athlete
- Ling Wan Ting (凌婉婷, born 1980), Hong Kong badminton player
- Ling Jie (凌洁, born 1982), Chinese artistic gymnast
- Ling Cong (凌琮, born 1985), Chinese football player
- Ling Zihan (凌子涵, born 1987), Chinese technology businesswoman
- Kang Ling (凌康, born 1997), Chinese racing driver
- Andrew Ling (凌顯祐), Hong Kong violist
- Charles Ling (凌晓峰), Chinese-born Canadian computer scientist
- Doris Ling-Cohan (凌德麗), American judge on the New York Supreme Court
- L.H.M. Ling (凌煥銘), American scholar of international affairs

=== Lìng (令) ===
There is also a less-common surname pronounced Lìng (令) in Mandarin. In some cases, it may be a shortened version of the surname Linghu (令狐). People with this surname include:

- Ling Zhengce (令政策, born 1952), Chinese politician
- Ling Jihua (令计划, born 1956), Chinese politician
- Huping Ling (令狐萍, born 1956), Chinese-born American historian
- Ling Wancheng (令完成, born 1960), Chinese businessman

=== Regional pronunciation of Lín (林) ===
"Ling" may also be an Eastern Min, Northern Min, or Wu transcription of the surname pronounced in Mandarin as Lín (林). People with this surname spelled as "Ling" include:

- Ling How Doong (林孝谆, 1934–2021), Singaporean politician and lawyer
- Ling Liong Sik (林良实, born 1943), Malaysian politician
- Victor Ling (林重慶, born 1943), Chinese-born Canadian medical researcher
- Jahja Ling (林望傑, born 1951), Indonesian-born American orchestral conductor
- Tschen La Ling (林球立, born 1956), Dutch football player
- John Wey Ling (林建伟; born c. 1958), Chinese-born American ballet dancer
- Alan Ling Sie Kiong (林思健, born 1983), Malaysian lawyer
- Julia Ling (林小微, born 1983), American television actress
- Landon Ling (林家亮, born 1987), Canadian football player

=== Other Chinese characters ===
One other rare surname (鈴) also pronounced Líng in Mandarin is believed to be used by only eight people in China. People with this surname include:

- Ling Kai (鈴凱, born 1986), Singaporean singer-songwriter

The following Chinese people have the surname Ling, but the characters for their Chinese names are not known:

- Jonathan Ling (born c. 1954), Australian businessman of Chinese descent, CEO of Fletcher Building
- Pam Ling (born 1968), American reality show actress of Chinese descent

The Vietnamese surname Linh originated from the Vietnamese pronunciation of a different character pronounced Líng in Mandarin (靈), which is not used as a surname in Chinese.

== Others ==
The English surname Ling, also spelled Linge, may have two different origins: one from a word used in Lincolnshire meaning "heath", and the other as a toponymic surname referring to the parish of Lyng, Somerset. Lings is a variant of the English surname Ling, with addition of an epenthetic s.

- Nicholas Ling (fl. 1570–1607), London publisher, bookseller, and editor
- Pehr Henrik Ling (1766–1839), Swedish medical-gymnastic practitioner
- Christopher Ling (1880–1953), English soldier and cricketer
- Archie Ling (1881–1943), English football player
- David W. Ling (1890–1965), American federal judge
- William Ling (cricketer) (1891–1960), South African cricketer
- William Ling (referee) (1908–1984), English football referee
- Anthony Ling (1910–1987), British cricket player
- James Ling (1922–2004), American founder of Ling-Temco-Vought
- Daniel Ling (1926–2003), Canadian scholar who studied the teaching of speech to deaf children
- Peter Ling (1926–2006), British scriptwriter and novelist
- Robin Ling (1927–2017), English surgeon who invented the Exeter hip system
- John Ling (1933–2005), British diplomat, farmer, politician and writer
- Sergey Ling (born 1937), Belarusian politician
- Staffan Ling (born 1944), Swedish actor and television presenter
- Richard Ling (born 1954), American communications scholar
- Martin Ling (born 1966), English football manager
- Tanya Ling (born 1966), Indian fashion designer
- Jamie Ling (born 1973), Canadian ice hockey player
- Björn A. Ling (born 1974), Swedish actor and bandy player
- David Ling (born 1975), Canadian professional ice hockey player
- Cameron Ling (born 1981), Australian rules footballer
- Edward Ling (born 1983), British sport shooter
- Adam Ling (born 1991), New Zealand rower
- Andy Ling, British trance artist and remixer

People with the surname Lings include:

- Martin Lings (1909–2005), English philosophical writer
- Stephen Lings, English wildlife artist

== Fictional characters ==
- Francine Smith (née Ling) from the animated television series American Dad!
- Ling Xiaoyu (凌曉雨) from the Tekken video game series
- Ling Yao, a character from the anime/manga series Fullmetal Alchemist
- Ling Zhen (凌振) from the classical novel Water Margin
- Mei Ling, a guest character from the cartoon series What's New, Scooby-Doo?, in the episode "Block-Long Hong Kong Terror"
- Penny Ling, from Littlest Pet Shop
- Lynn Minmay (鈴明美) from Robotech
- Ling, a character from the Mulan series
- Ivy Ling, American Girl character, best friend of Julie Albright
