= Lingua =

Lingua (Latin, 'tongue') may refer to:

== People ==
- Giorgio Lingua (born 1960), Italian prelate of the Catholic Church
- Marco Lingua (born 1978), Italian hammer thrower

== Other uses ==
- Lingua, a peer-reviewed academic journal of general linguistics
- Lingua, a sculpture made by Jim Sanborn
- Lingua, a 17th-century play attributed to Thomas Tomkis
- Project Lingua, an online translation community
- Lingua, an Indonesian vocal group
- TVN Lingua, a defunct Polish television channel

== See also ==
- Language (disambiguation)
- Linga (disambiguation)
- Lingga (disambiguation)
- Tongue (disambiguation)
- Lingua franca, a common language
- Lingua.ly, an educational technology business
