= Shivling (disambiguation) =

Shivling may refer to:

- Lingam, a representation of Shiva
- Shivalinga (2016 film), Kannada film
- Sivalinga (film), Tamil film
- Shivling (mountain), a mountain in Uttarakhand
- Shivaling, Nepal

== See also ==
- Linga (disambiguation)
- Ling (disambiguation)
