= Linger =

Linger may refer to:

== Music ==
- Linger (album), a 1990 album by Prudence Liew, or the title single
- "Linger" (The Cranberries song), 1993
- "Linger" (Guy Sebastian song), 2014
- "Linger", a 2022 single by Zior Park with LNGRS
- "Linger", a 2023 song by Poppy from the album Zig
- "Linger", a 2024 song by Becky Hill from the album Believe Me Now?

== Other uses ==
- Linger (film), a 2008 Hong Kong film directed by Johnnie To
- Linger (surname)
- Linger, Luxembourg, a town in the commune of Bascharage, Luxembourg
- Linger (novel), a 2010 Wolves of Mercy Falls novel by Maggie Stiefvater

== See also ==
- Ling (disambiguation)
- Lingering (disambiguation)
- Lunger (disambiguation)
