= Linga (disambiguation) =

A linga, or lingam, is a symbol of the Hindu deity Shiva.

Linga may also refer to:

== People ==
- Praveen Linga (born 1979), Indian chemical engineer

== Places ==
- Linga, Victoria, Australia
- Linga, Madhya Pradesh, India
- List of islands called Linga, in Scotland

== Other uses ==
- Linga language, a language of the Democratic Republic of the Congo
- Linga (cookie), a sesame seed cookie from the Philippines
- Linga (spider), a genus of spiders
- Latvian patrol boat Linga (P-03), a Latvian Navy ship

== See also ==
- Linga Sound (disambiguation)
- Lingaa, a 2014 Indian Tamil-language action drama film
  - Lingaa (soundtrack), its soundtrack album by A. R. Rahman
- Shivling (disambiguation)
- Lingga (disambiguation)
- Lingua (disambiguation)
- Lingas (disambiguation)
- Ling (disambiguation)
