= Lunger =

Lunger may refer to:

- Lunger (surname), a surname
- Lunger, someone with tuberculosis

== See also ==
- Linger (disambiguation)
- "Longer"
- Lungern
