= Melbourne Rebels =

Former Australian rugby union team, based in Melbourne, Victoria

- Union: Rugby Australia (Victoria)
- Nickname: Rebels
- Founded: 2009; 17 years ago (Note: The team was created on 5 January 2009 but did not compete professionally until 2011.)
- Disbanded: 2024; 2 years ago
- Location: Melbourne, Victoria, Australia
- Region: Victoria
- Ground(s): Melbourne Rectangular Stadium (Capacity: 30,000)
- Most caps: Reece Hodge (100)
- Top scorer: Reece Hodge (573)
- League: Super Rugby
- 2024: 8th of 12, Quarter-finals
Home kit	Away kit	Cultural kit

Official website
- melbournerebels.rugby

The Melbourne Rebels were an Australian professional rugby union team based in Melbourne, Victoria that competed in the Super Rugby competition. (Note: When the Melbourne Rebels entered the competition it was called the "Super Rugby" or "Super 15". By their last season, in 2024, the competition had been renamed to the Super Rugby Pacific.) The Rebels made their debut in SANZAR's Super Rugby tournament in 2011. The club shared its name with a former Australian Rugby Championship (ARC) team, but was unrelated. The team played its home matches at the Melbourne Rectangular Stadium, in the city's Melbourne Sports and Entertainment Precinct, and played one game of the 2020 Super Rugby season at Eureka Stadium in Ballarat.

The team's participation agreement was revoked by Rugby Australia (RA) at the conclusion of the 2024 Super Rugby Pacific season. The women's team was also disbanded by Rugby Australia.

== History ==
The era of professionalism in rugby union led to a restructuring of the Super 10 competition after the 1995 World Cup. SANZAR was formed to manage a 12-team provincial union from Australia, New Zealand and South Africa. During the early years of 2000s South Africa and Australia pushed for additional teams each. Argentina also expressed interest. Discussions also included a federated Pacific Islands team in the vein of the West Indies cricket team or individual island nations.

Bids for the 13th and 14th franchise opened in 2002. Melbourne had, to that point, successfully hosted several Wallaby test matches which the Victorian Rugby Union used to demonstrate a ground swell of support for rugby union by the Victorian public. Melbourne also hosted several World Cup matches hosted at Docklands Stadium and drew 50,000 to the final day of the 2006 Melbourne Commonwealth Games Rugby 7s.

The then Bracks government promised investment in infrastructure, considering a 25,000 seat redevelopment of Olympic Park Stadium or $100m for a new stadium. The successful bid went to Western Australia, ultimately becoming the Western Force for the 2004 Super 14 season.

In 2006 the Australian Rugby Union, following the suggestions of a working party, announced the formation of a national domestic competition. The Melbourne Rebels were established for the inaugural season of the Australian Rugby Championship by virtue of NSW surrendering a fourth team in favour of Victoria. Coached by Bill Millard and captained by David Croft, the Rebels finished fourth (out of 8) and were runners up. The move was viewed as an interim step to a Super 14 franchise.

The VRU bid twice for a team in SANZAR's 'Super' provincial competition before being accepted for the 2011 season. Their winning bid was named after the team they fielded in the ARC.

On 29 July, at the Victorian Rugby Union's quarterly corporate luncheon, the Melbourne Rebels and the Victorian Rugby Union launched the playing strip, logo and club song "Do You Hear the People Sing?" from Les Misérables.

=== Super Rugby license ===
With SANZAR announcing a restructure while renegotiating broadcast rights, an additional licence was created. Ten bids were received: seven from Australia, two from New Zealand (Hawkes Bay and Taranaki) and the Southern Kings from South Africa.

The Australian expressions of interest included three from Victoria, one from Western Sydney, one from the Gold Coast, the New South Wales Country Rugby Union (backed by John Singleton) and a second Queensland team.

Three expressions of interest came out of Victoria for new Super licence- the Vic Super 15 headed by Mark Ella and backed by Kevin Maloney along with three former VRU directors, a Belgravia Group bid led by Geoff Lord (on behalf of the Melbourne Victory) and the Melbourne Rebels bid from the Victorian Rugby Union with backing from media magnate Harold Mitchell with assistance from corporate consultants, including KPMG.

On 12 August 2009, the Australian Rugby Union endorsed Victoria as Australia's sole candidate state for the new licence in the Australian conference in the expanded 2011 Super Rugby competition. They attempted to broker a deal that would consolidate the three bids as a singular entity that they hoped would be "overwhelmingly successful". The Melbourne Rebels bid petitioned the Australian Rugby Union to submit only one of the three bids to SANZAR.

The efforts to amalgamate these bids was fraught with politics. Investment banker John Wylie brokered a tentative agreement between the Melbourne Rebels and the Vic Super 15 that was announced at the 2009 Weary Dunlop Luncheon.

Given that SANZAR could not reach a unanimous decision the matter was sent to arbitration. The arbitrators felt that the Southern Kings' bid was more advanced with regard to business and financial planning and organisation structure and governance. They also felt that the Southern Kings also had a stronger player base and rugby tradition. Revenue however, from the sale of broadcasting rights to Australasian broadcasters, would be reduced by US$15–20m over the course of a five-year agreement should the 15th team be resident in South Africa.

On 12 November 2009, after an arbitration process between themselves and South Africa's Southern Kings, Victoria was awarded the 15th Super Rugby licence, as it was considered more financially viable to SANZAR. The bid was provisionally offered to the Vicsuper 15 consortium but when the ARU declined to offer a $4.3m grant commensurate with funding supplied to the other Australian franchise, the Mark Ella led consortium withdrew its bid. The licence was subsequently awarded to the Victorian Rugby Union's Melbourne Rebels.

=== Establishment ===
The ownership licence was handed to Harold Mitchell's consortium on 5 January 2010. The following day the ARU announced restrictions on the Rebels, gagging the franchise from announcing their signings from other Australian Super rugby team players until 1 June 2010. The Melbourne Rebels and the Rugby Union Players Association threatened legal action and successful had the embargo moved to 15 March. Rod Macqueen was appointed Head Coach, and Director of Coaching on 12 January. Damien Hill became Macqueen's assistant. Former Western Force CEO Greg Harris was appointed general manager, Football Operations.

Brian Waldron was initially appointed CEO, but resigned in April after being implicated in salary cap rorting while CEO of the Melbourne Storm. Auditor were called to examine Waldron's signings to ensure, as Wilson put it, "[Rebels] procedures are in accordance with the [ARU] protocols."

Pat Wilson, a former CEO of the Manly Warringah Sea Eagles and New South Wales Waratahs, and former ARU general manager of high performance became interim CEO in April, until Ross Oakley was appointed in September. Mitchell said he expected the Rebels to retain Wilson in some capacity.

In September 2011 Oakley stood down from the Rebels and was succeeded by Steven Boland as CEO. The Rebels announced the succession plan, citing Boland's credentials as an executive at Visy and Veolia, and his presidency of the Parramatta Rugby Club during its rebuilding phase.

On 15 April 2013, Harold Mitchell announced that CEO Steve Boland had resigned, citing other opportunities. On 17 April, the Rebels announced the appointment of interim CEO Rob Clarke. Clarke, who had been CEO of the ACT Brumbies between 2003 and 2005 and chief operating officer of the Australian Rugby Union 2006–07, will fill the role until season's end.

Eddie Jones said the Rebels should not have been added to Super Rugby: "The reason they're in is because of TV rights. The current 14-team competition is just starting to find its feet [and the] addition of another Australian franchise is not good for Australian [or Super] rugby ..." Jones went on: "Another Australian side is just going to weaken the third and fourth teams. ... It's unrealistic for Australia to have five teams and it will be bad for Wallaby rugby in the short-term, for the next 10 to 15 years."

Contrary to Jones, Wallabies coach Robbie Deans stated the side's vast experience was an asset and predicted the Rebels could be competitive from the outset.

=== Financial operations ===
==== Transfer of shares ====
On 27 June 2013, the RaboDirect Rebels announced that foundation shareholders Harold Mitchell, Bob Dalziel, Lyndsey Cattermole, Alan Winney, Ralph D'Silva, Gary Gray, Paul Kirk, Leon L'Huillier, David Ogilvy and Michael Bartlett had signed a term sheet dealing with the 100% transfer of their shares to the Victorian Rugby Union. The decision was made to promote the growth of Rugby in Victoria, with both the community and professional arms working together on joint objectives.

As part of the transfer of ownership, Melbourne Rebels chairman Harold Mitchell was succeeded by Jonathan Ling. The two organisations combined operations, with Rob Clarke becoming CEO for both organisations, and Ross Oakley stepping away from his role as VRU CEO.

==== 2015 sale ====
The Rebels proved to be a financial drain on the Australian Rugby Union; the franchise was responsible for more than half of the ARU's deficit of A$6.3 million in fiscal 2014. In June 2015, the ARU announced that the Rebels had been purchased by locally based Imperium Sports Management. The ARU is understood to have spent $15.6 million in the franchise.

==== Threat of disbandment ====
During the 2017 season the ARU announced that one Australian franchise would be axed from Super Rugby, as the competition was trimmed to 15 teams. They announced that either the Rebels or the Western Force were at threat of the axe hoping to come to a decision by April at the latest. Rebels CEO Andrew Cox sold the franchise back to the Victorian Rugby Union for $1 in an attempt to protect and 'save' the Rebels as the VRU were unlikely to sell the franchise to the ARU as they would axe it, whereas crucially the Force were owned solely by the ARU. On 10 August the Force were instead axed from Super Rugby with the Rebels surviving as a Super Rugby side.

==== Termination of license ====
In January 2024, the Rebels were placed in voluntary administration, with over $22 million in debt owing to creditors, including $11.6 million to the Australian Taxation Office, $5.7 million to board members, $2.8 million to suppliers, almost $2 million owed to the Victorian Government, $1.1 million in unpaid stadium tenancy fees for use of AAMI Park, $720,000 to the state revenue office and $250,000 in employee superannuation. The Rebels reportedly had just $17,300 in the bank, with assets including office furniture, gym equipment and two cars.

On 14 February 2024, it was reported that 10 administrative staff, including chief executive Baden Stephenson, were made redundant, with the remaining staff and coaches put on four-month contracts to see out the Super Rugby campaign. A financial analysis revealed the Rebels lost $54 million in their 14-year history, or about $10,000 each day.

On 30 May 2024, several news outlets reported that Rugby Australia had rejected a private consortium's plan to fund the club until 2030, as the consortium's projections for revenue growth and cost savings were "overly optimistic" and posed an "unacceptable level of risk". Consequently, the club was removed from further participation in the Super Rugby competition at the conclusion of the 2024 season; a decision which came only days after the club qualified for its first finals series. Leigh Clifford, the head of the private consortium seeking to take over the Rebels' competition license, responded to the axing by pledging to take Rugby Australia to court over the decision. Rugby Australia stated that a decision on the future of the Rebels' women's team "will be made as part of [a] broader process later in the year".

On 9 October 2024, the Rebels' directors commenced legal proceedings against Rugby Australia in the Federal Court of Australia seeking $30 million in damages, the right to inspect Rugby Australia books to determine whether there had been fiduciary and governance failures, and a declaration that they can resume control of the Rebels so they can continue to play in the Super Rugby competition, with the directors alleging that Rugby Australia had treated the team unfairly and unequally compared to other Super Rugby franchises and "has breached various sections of the Corporations Act, has unlawfully oppressed the Rebels, and is obliged to indemnify the Rebels for liabilities to the Australian Taxation Office incurred when Rebels players were playing for Rugby Australia teams". The next day, Rugby Australia released a media statement publicly disputing the Rebels' allegations, labelling the Rebels' allegations as inaccurate and misleading, alleging that the Rebel's directions were attempting to shift blame for their financial mismanagement, and announcing their intention to file a counterclaim against the Rebels.

In November 2024, The Roar rugby journalist Christy Doran published an article stating that the Rebels had been approached regarding participation in a yet-to-be-launched LIV Golf style rugby tournament.

== Rivalries ==
=== Waratahs ===
The Rebels–Waratahs rivalry, which could similarly be viewed as a Victoria–New South Wales rivalry, was a rivalry held between the Rebels and the New South Wales Waratahs that was established upon the inclusion into the Super Rugby of the Melbourne-based team in 2011. The rivalry, which was contested twice annually, also doubled as a contest for the Weary Dunlop Shield, a trophy named in honour of Sir Edward "Weary" Dunlop (1907–1993), a highly respected Australian war hero, surgeon, and former rugby player from regional Victoria. The meetings held between the Rebels and Waratahs were heavily one-sided in favour of the latter, whom held an 18–8 record by the time of its extinction. The Rebels did not defeat the Waratahs in a competitive fixture until the 2013 season, and did not achieve a second victory until the 2016 season. The most successful era for the Rebels during the rivalry was between 2020 and 2024, in which the Rebels held a 6–3 record against the Waratahs, including three victories in three different Waratahs home venues (Sydney Cricket Ground, Western Sydney Stadium, Sydney Football Stadium).

=== Sunwolves ===
Although not formally declared, or cited, as a rivalry, the Rebels shared a competitive relationship with the Japanese Sunwolves during their period in the Super Rugby. Beginning in 2016, the Rebels and Sunwolves contested for the Ganbatte Trophy. The Rebels were notably the first Australasian Super Rugby team to match up against the Sunwolves. With the Rebels winning all but one of the six contested fixtures, the trophy was stated as being an initiative that would strengthen both teams' relationship and provide a "strong reference point of what all players from both sides should strive for in the future."

== Name, colours, and logo ==
The Rebels name was chosen for the Melbourne ARC team in consultation with the local rugby community; VRU officials decided on the Rebels name in reference to Victoria's first Wallaby, Sir Edward "Weary" Dunlop. Chris "Buddha" Handy said at the launch, that "like the great Weary Dunlop, Victorian rugby has a history of daring to be different, a touch of the larrikin, and always having a go. These qualities are what you want in a Rebel and characterise the way Victoria is successfully tackling this historic year." The name was retained for the Super team.

The Melbourne Rebels and the Victorian Rugby Union launched the Super Rugby logo and jersey at the Weary Dunlop lunch on 29 July 2010. The logo's five stars represent the Rebel creed: Respect (yourself and the opposition), Excellence (highest standards in everything we do), Balance (sport and life, determination and humility), Ethos (team first, 'we, not me'), Leadership (challenge the status quo).

The Rebels colours are based on the state of Victoria's traditional colour of navy blue. Both the logo and kit heavily feature navy blue, while the iconic five stars that run vertically down the centre of both are white, also a traditional Victorian colour. Red has also been incorporated to give the Rebels their own uniqueness and to slightly differ them to other Victorian-based sporting clubs.

The home kit is predominantly navy blue with navy blue shorts and socks, and also features red and white trimmings. Since 2023, the away kit is mainly pink, but features narrow navy blue trimmings. The kits are manufactured by Dynasty Sport, after changing its apparel partner from BLK in 2022.

== Location and venues ==
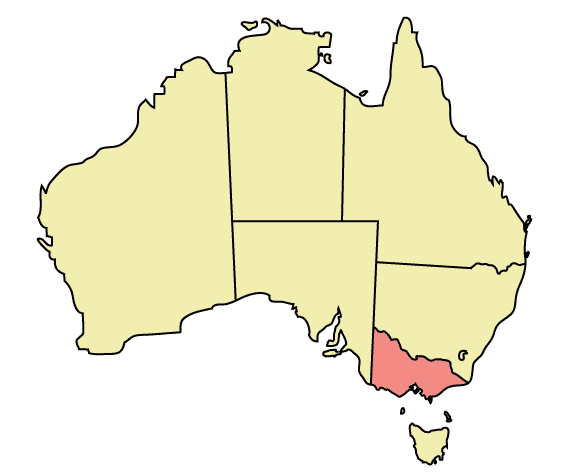
Franchise area of the Rebels.

The Rebels represent Victoria in the Super Rugby provincial tournament. The franchise area includes the 25 Victorian senior clubs of the Victorian Rugby Union, who view the Rebels as the final step for elite Victorian players to representative rugby. The 2010 state trials experienced a huge increase in participation, attributed to the establishment of the Rebels.

In addition to representing Victoria and the Victorian Rugby Union sides, the Rebels sought to build player pathways for South Australian rugby players. They developed a Memorandum of Understanding with the South Australian Rugby Union in 2011, with Brighton Rugby Club lock Andrew Brown being selected to play in the Rebels reserve side against Sydney Rugby Union representative side.

=== Stadium and facilities ===
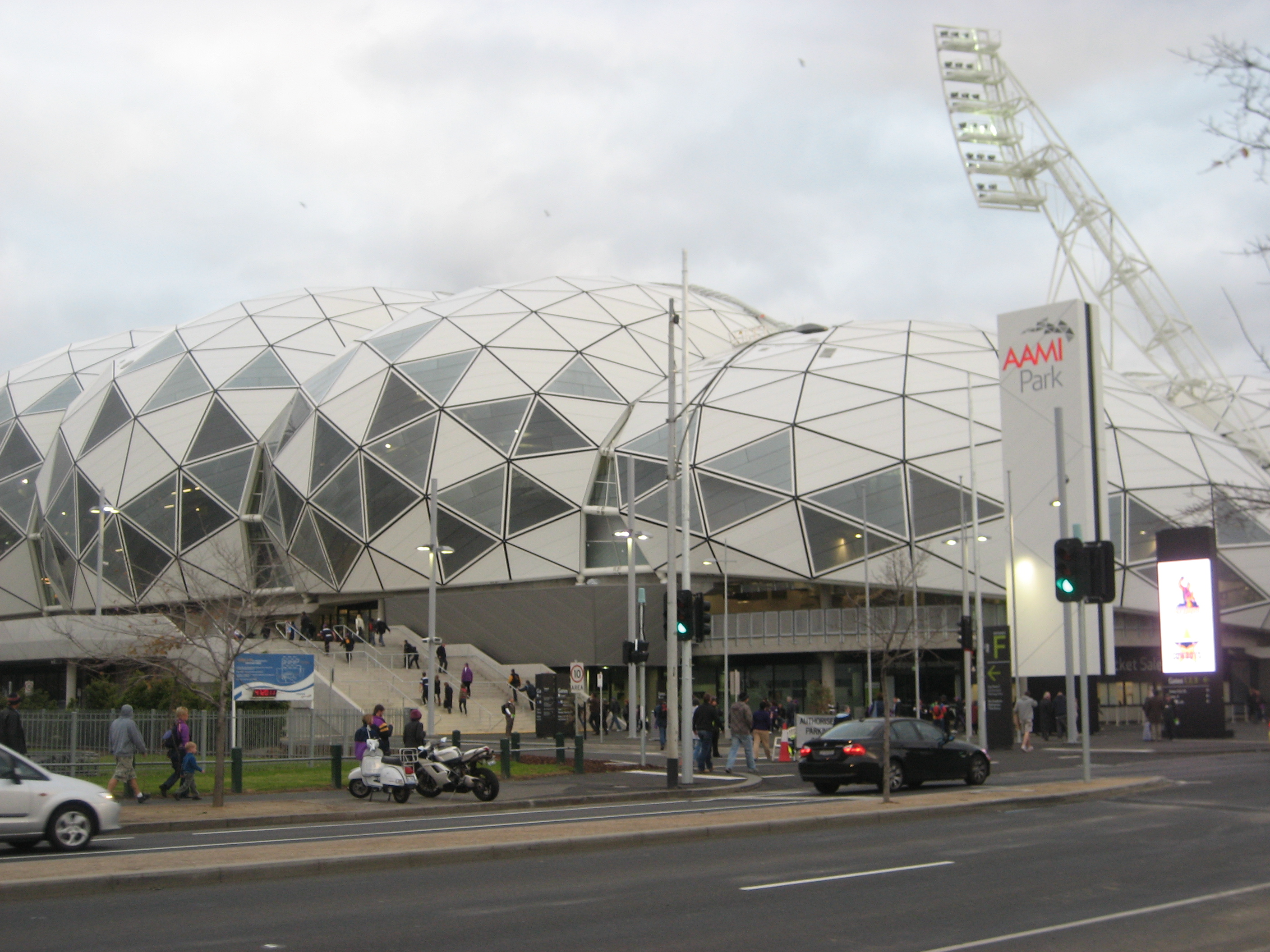
AAMI Park

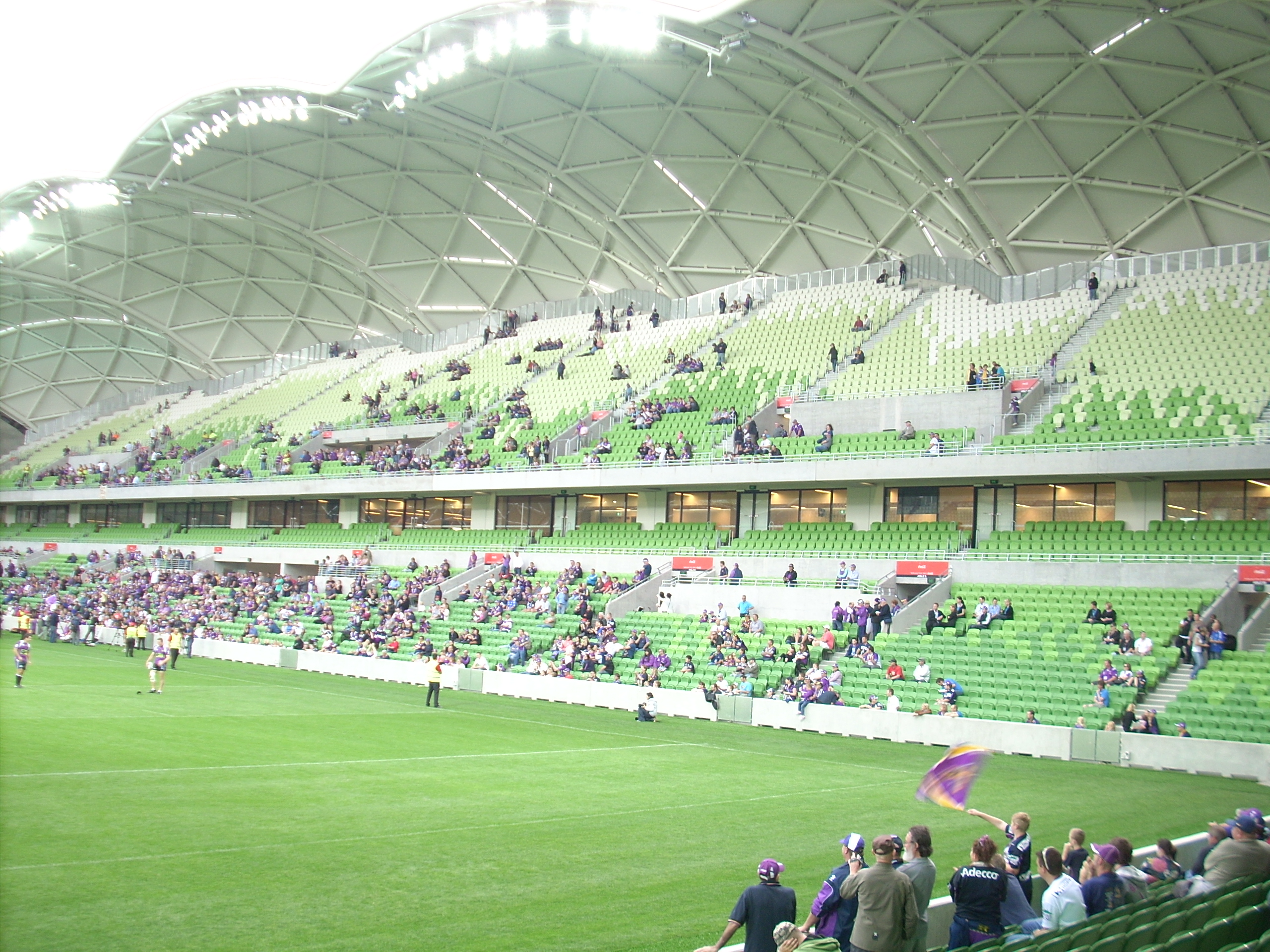
Eastern Stand

The Melbourne Rebels play their home games at AAMI Park in inner Melbourne's Sport and Entertainment Precinct. The stadium has a capacity of 30,050, but is decreased slightly to 29,500 seats for Super Rugby matches.

The stadium officially opened 8 May 2010 after the Victorian government looked to build a specialised rectangular arena in Melbourne to accommodate the growing sports of soccer, rugby league and rugby union, and to also complement the circular Melbourne Cricket Ground and Docklands Stadium.

AAMI Park was designed by Cox Architecture with input from Waratah and former Wallaby prop Al Baxter.

Rebels training and administration are based at AAMI Park, utilising Gosch's Paddock for field training.

== Supporters ==
In April 2009, Neville Howard and Gavin Norman created an independent supporter group to grow awareness of the bid at a grassroots level. The Rebel Army networked via Facebook and Twitter; in early 2011 the Facebook page was 'liked' by 4500 fans and 600 Twitter followers.

The Herald Sun's Russell Gould compared the Rebel Army with Melbourne Storm's banner crew. Gould interviewed Rebel Army founder Gavin Norman who said: "The Rebels and the Waratahs have been talking up the interstate rivalries ... We are trying to make it a bit more tribal."

After the licence was awarded to Australia and subsequently Melbourne, the group became the Rebel Army, and were acknowledged on the Rebel website by hooker and media columnist Adam Freier who wrote:

"There are two types of people who watch sport. Their worth to us as players are equal, but there are some subtle differences. There are supporters and then there are fans- the fanatics who are crazy about their sport and team. The Rebel Army are beyond both ... My team mates and I love the fact that The Rebel Army are bridging the gap and making it easier for the players to follow our supporters."

Adam Freier also referenced the Army in his column on 'Rugby Heaven' (Fairfax) "The Rebel Army motto is "by the fans for the fans" ... Never have I been a prouder player as I walk past the clan at the games, and never have I felt so normal when I swing by and have a chat. They are very much part of the Rebels team."

Other sport reporters including Wide World of Sports' Matt McKay, and The Roar's Brett McKay. McKay wrote:

"I've given the Rebel Army numerous raps this season, all of them well deserved. I think what they've brought to Australian Rugby has been a breath of fresh air within an environment that has ferociously stuck to its tweed coat and chardonnay stereotypes."

== Seasons ==
=== 2011 ===
==== Pre-season ====
The Rebels played two pre-season games against Tonga, and one against Fiji, before facing the Crusaders (New Zealand), a fortnight before Round One.

The Rebels won both games against Tonga, 43–13 at Olympic Park and 54–0 at Latrobe City Stadium in Morwell, playing two uncontracted amateur players from Victorian Rugby Union clubs; Chris Slade from the Melbourne Unicorns and Sam Latunipulu Jnr from the Southern Districts Pirates.

Coach Macqueen said, after the contests with Tonga: "We were looking to try a few different things and a lot of them came off, so overall, we were happy with the performance; ... it's not about winning and losing, it's about trialling things under pressure. [We had pressure and] started to see a lot of the team structure, too, a lot of phases of play coming off. ... We are about to enter into one of the toughest competitions in world rugby. If we were playing like we are now, we wouldn't be successful ..."

==== Foundation team ====
The first signing was London Wasps fly half Danny Cipriani initially slated to play at fullback, a position he's played on occasion for the Wasps. Prop Laurie Weeks signed 18 March. Welsh number 8 Gareth Delve signed 28 March saying, "The opportunity to test myself alongside the best players in world rugby in a competition I have grown up admiring, was one I couldn't refuse." Stirling Mortlock signed 31 March, in a three-year deal for an undisclosed sum.

Jarrod Saffy became the first Rebel to 'convert' from rugby league. The ARU was reluctant to allow the Rebels to sign rugby league players, due to a high number of converts returning to league. In the case of Saffy they made an exception, considering his selection in the Australian school boys, the Australian U21s and the Australian Sevens sides.

The Rebels inaugural season kicked off on 18 February, with a Round One match against the Waratahs (NSW) at home, in front of over 24,000 people. The Rebels made four changes to the starting 15 to take on the Brumbies on 25 February, in front of over 14,000 people. Huxley moved to inside centre (number 12), allowing Mark Gerrard to make his debut at full back. Danny Cipriani and Nick Phipps also took their places in the run-on 15 for their first times. It was Cipriani who scored the first points for the Rebels, with a successful penalty kick in the 15th minute. Captain Stirling Mortlock scored the Rebels' first try with eight minutes to go, to put the team in front 22–19. Shortly after, Brumbies' winger Henry Speight scored a controversial try, off what appeared to be a clear forward pass, and the Brumbies were ahead 24–22. In the final minute of the game, the Brumbies gave away a penalty 37 metres out from the Rebels line, after some push and shove in a Brumbies scrum. Danny Cipriani slotted the penalty, handing Melbourne their debut Super Rugby win, 25 points to 24.

The Rebels won their Round Six home-game against the Wellington Hurricanes, and their Round Seven clash against the Western Force. For Rounds 13 and 14 the Rebels travelled to South Africa for games against the Bulls and the Cheetahs. The Rebels lost 47–10 to the Bulls, yet Bulls coach Frans Ludeke expressed confidence that the Rebels could experience a rapid rise.

==== Post-season ====
The Rebels finished 15th on the overall competition log and last in the Australian conference winning 3 games (eclipsing the Western Force's 1 win, 2 draws and 10 losses) and falling 3 log points short the Cheetahs debut season (who won 5 and lost 8 incurring 27 log points). The franchise announced the morning after their final round loss to the Western Force they had signed a two-year deal with James O'Connor and Mitch Inman in addition to Kurtley Beale from the Waratahs. Rod Macqueen stepped down as head coach to take up a place on the board of directors and was succeeded as head coach by former assistant Damien Hill. There were three retirees from the inaugural squad; Kevin O'Neill, Greg Somerville and Sam Cordingley while Luke Rooney returned to French rugby club Toulon. The Rebels announced a week-long post season tour; playing Bath, Worcester and European champions Leinster. At the 2011 Australian Super Rugby Awards Rebels incumbent scrumhalf Nick Phipps won the Australian conference Rookie of the year award. New Senior Coach John Muggleton joined the Rebels as defence specialist after coaching Georgia at the 2011 Rugby World Cup.

=== 2012 ===
It took until Round 5 for the Rebels to win under new coach Damien Hill. They would go on to win a further 3 games including a comeback win against the Crusaders and a first ever victory against the Auckland Blues in round 7. Kurtley Beale was named player's player of the year while Gareth Delve won the people's player of the year award. Caderyn Neville won Rookie of the year. Overall the Rebels finished 13th in the table.

=== 2013 ===
The Rebels in 2013 were bolstered by the signings of Scott Higginbotham and Japanese hooker Shota Horie and these signings helped them achieve a 12th-place finish, securing a franchise record 36 points. The secured their first victory over a South African side when the defeated the Stormers and also claimed the Weary Dunlop shield when they defeated the NSW Waratahs. In 2013 the Rebels also hosted the touring British & Irish Lions side, although they were defeated 35–0 at AAMI Park. At the conclusion of the season that the Rebels had transferred their shares to the Victorian Rugby Union after three seasons of private ownership.

=== 2014 ===
2014 saw change for the Rebels with Tony McGahan taking over from Hill as head coach and 15 Rebels making their debuts across the season. Despite this upheaval the Rebels still secured 4 wins including a 35–14 win against the Cheetahs, their highest ever winning margin, and a first victory over the Queensland Reds. 2014 could be seen as a season of near misses though for the Rebels as they either defeated or secured a losing bonus point against 6 of the 8 top finishers in the table that season.

=== 2015 ===
The Rebels in 2015 was a settled outfit with 20 of the players from the previous season being retained. Young players including Jack Debreczeni, Nic Stirzaker and Sean McMahon all flourished as the Rebels secured 7 wins across the season, the most in a season since its inception. They achieved their first ever overseas victory against the Crusaders and 5 Rebels were selected for a preliminary Australia squad in July. At the conclusion of the 2015 season the Rebels were sold to Imperium Sports Management led by Andrew Cox.

=== 2016 ===
The 2016 season started with the Rebels signing two local talents, Sione Tuipulotu and Rob Leota, who would become the first players to come from the Victorian rugby system to play for the Rebels. The Rebels also signed Reece Hodge from the pathway although he was not a local player. The Rebels won 3 of their first 4 games and after defeating the Cheetahs in round 9 were top of the Australian conference, however an injury crisis would see them fall to 3rd in the Australian conference and 12th overall.

=== 2017 ===
2017 was a season of struggle for the Rebels, as the threat of the axe by the ARU hung over their head across the season, and a horrific run of injuries saw 39 different players play across the season, and a further 13 signed to help deal with this injury crisis. The Rebels had recruited strongly in the off season with Welsh international Dominic Day, Japanese international Amanaki Mafi and NRL star Marika Koroibete joining along with a selection of young talent including another young Victorian talent Jordan Uelese, who would win his first Australian cap at the end of the season. Kiwi fly-half Jackson Garden-Bachop would become the 100th player to represent the Rebels, while the only remaining foundation player, Laurie Weeks, became the most capped player. The Rebels only won once across the season, a 19–17 victory against the Brumbies, while there was also a 9–9 draw against the Sharks in Durban as the Rebels finished 18th and bottom of the Super Rugby ladder. The threat of the axe from Super Rugby continued to hang over the Rebels well into the off season when it was announced that the Western Force would be axed and the Rebels saved, with CEO Andrew Cox transferring his shares back to the Victorian Rugby Union to secure the future of the Rebels. At the end of the season coach Tony McGahan departed the club to become the Reds' assistant coach.

=== 2018 ===
2018 saw great change for the Rebels, as 28 players departed the Rebels and 20 new players debuted, 12 of them new signings from the now defunct Force. David Wessels was appointed the new coach, moving from the Force, and major signings were made in Australian international scrum-half Will Genia, Australian international lock Adam Coleman and former England and British and Irish Lion Geoff Parling. On the field the Rebels made a significant improvement winning 4 of their first 5 matches, although they would only win 3 more narrowly missing out of their first appearance in the Super Rugby playoffs. Jack Maddocks finished the season as the Rebels top try scorer with 9 tries, including the first ever Rebels hat-trick in Week 3 against the Sunwolves, while Reece Hodge overtook Jason Woodward as the Rebels leading points scorer, with his 117 points in the season putting him on 298 points total for the Rebels. The season though ended on a sour note for the Rebels as disciplinary problems involving players Amanaki Mafi and Lopeti Timani before a nightclub incident involving Hunter Paisami led to an integrity review being ordered by the Rebels.

=== 2019 ===
2019 was much similar to 2018 for the Rebels as they just missed out of the playoffs again, finishing with 7 wins and 9 losses in 11th overall. Further Wallaby additions were made in the off season in former Reds fly-half Quade Cooper, while Luke Jones and Matt To'omua returned to Australia from Europe to join the Rebels. Foundation Rebel Laurie Weeks announced his retirement just before the season finishing with 85 caps for the club, while Geoff Parling retired and joined the coaching staff. Jack Maddocks would finish the season as top try scorer with 10 tries, while Tom English became the most capped player for the club, ending the season on 94 caps. The Rebels season though petering out for the second season in succession, having started with 5 wins from 7 games, caused concern leading to a comprehensive on-field review being held at the end of the season.

=== 2020 ===
2020 saw major departures to the Rebels squad as Wallabies Adam Coleman, Quade Cooper, Will Genia and Jack Maddocks all departed following the 2019 Rugby World Cup, with younger players including Andrew Deegan, Andrew Kellaway, Josh Kemeny and Cameron Orr join the side, along with Fijian international Frank Lomani. The Super Rugby season, though, was abandoned after 7 rounds due to the COVID-19 pandemic. During these 7 rounds the Rebels won 3 of their 6 games, with new signing Kellaway topping the try scoring charts with 7 tries. In July, a domestic Super Rugby AU competition replaced the remainder of the Super Rugby season, with the Rebels playing the 3 other Australian sides, and a returning Western Force. The Rebels, playing all their fixtures away from home and staying in hotels in New South Wales and the ARU due to an outbreak of COVID-19 in Victoria, won 4 of their 8 group games qualifying them for the qualifying final against the Reds, the first time any Rebels side had made the Super Rugby playoffs stage, with a 79th minute Cabous Eloff try and conversion allowing them to beat the Force by enough points in their final group match to qualify. They though would lose the qualifying final 25–13.

=== 2021 ===
2021 again saw a Super Rugby AU format played, with the addition of the Super Rugby Trans-Tasman competition, where Australian sides would play New Zealand sides head-to-head for 5 rounds, at the conclusion of the Super Rugby AU competition. In Super Rugby AU, the Rebels missed out on the playoffs, winning 3 and losing 5. Following missing out on the playoffs, coach David Wessels stepped down, replaced by assistant Kevin Foote on an interim basis for the rest of the season. The Rebels though were unable to win any of their Trans-Tasman fixtures, finishing in 9th place, only ahead of the Waratahs on points difference, having picked up no bonus points. The Rebels again would spend most of the Super Rugby Trans-Tasman competition on the road due to COVID-19 restrictions in Victoria, with the Rebels final three fixtures all played at Leichhardt Oval in Sydney.

=== 2022 ===
2022 saw a return to the Round-robin format, with the addition of the Fijian Drua and Moana Pasifika to the competition. The Rebels finished 10th in the log, once again missing out on the playoffs, finishing with 4 wins in Kevin Foote's first full season in charge. The side though brought through a number of young players in the season with Josh Canham, Daniel Maiava and Lukas Ripley all making their Rebels debuts. With the easing of travel restrictions following the COVID-19 pandemic, the Rebels though were able to host all their fixtures in Melbourne, with the city also hosting 5 fixtures of Round 10, in a branded 'Super Round'. Matt To'omua would finish as the side's top points scorer, with 78 points, before departing at the end of the season, along with fellow internationals James Hanson and Joe Powell.

=== 2023 ===
2023 The Rebels finished in 11th place, although they were competitive throughout the entire season and were only eliminated from Finals in the last round after a loss to the Highlanders in Dunedin. The Rebels also hosted the "Super Round" in round two, which was more successful in crowd numbers than the first iteration. The Rebels performed well in many games, having leads against teams such as the Hurricanes, Blues, Force, Crusaders at half time but not competing as well in the second half of games, going on to lose all of these fixtures. Reece Hodge would become the most capped Rebel in 2023, becoming the sides first centurion, while eight Rebels were selected for the 2023 Rugby World Cup, 7 for the Wallabies with Richard Hardwick also representing Namibia at the tournament. While playing an attacking and entertaining style of rugby, the team admitted it needed to play the full 80 minutes. Kevin Foote and the coaching team were extended on their contracts for 3 years, alongside a number of multi-year squad signings which has meant continued stability in the squad.

=== 2024 ===
The start of 2024 saw the Rebels make a number of big name signings in Wallabies Filipo Daugunu, Lukhan Salakaia-Loto and Taniela Tupou however in January the side went into voluntary administration due to outstanding debts. By February support staff and CEO Baden Stephenson were all made redundant, with players contracts supported by RugbyAU for the duration of the 2024 season. Despite these challenges and doubts over the future of the side, the Rebels had the best performing season in their history, qualifying for their first finals appearance. In May it was announced that the Rebels would be wound up at the conclusion of the season, despite a potential private consortium bid for the franchise. The Rebels final match was their first finals appearance against the Hurricanes, losing 47–20.

== Season-by-season record ==
Super Rugby Results
Year	Place	Played	Win	Draw	Loss	PF	PA	Diff	BP	Points	Playoffs
2011	15th	16	3	0	13	281	560	−279	4	24	
2012	13th	16	4	0	12	362	520	−158	8	32	
2013	12th	16	5	0	11	382	515	−133	9	37	
2014	15th	16	4	0	12	303	460	−157	5	21	
2015	10th	16	7	0	9	319	354	−35	8	36	
2016	12th	15	7	0	8	365	486	−121	3	31	
2017	18th	15	1	1	13	236	569	−333	3	9	
2018	9th	16	7	0	9	440	461	–21	8	36	
2019	11th	16	7	0	9	393	465	–72	6	34	
2020 (Note: The 2020 Super Rugby season was suspended after 7 rounds due to the COVID-19 pandemic. A regional tournament was organised thereafter featuring the teams in the Australian conference. Only the results from those 7 rounds are shown here.)	9th	6	3	0	3	166	160	+6	1	13	
2020 AU (Note: The 2020 Super Rugby AU season was a domestic round-robin series that supplanted the suspended 2020 Super Rugby season. It features the four Australian Super Rugby teams along with the Western Force.)	3rd	8	4	1	3	194	178	+16	1	19	Lost qualifying final to Reds
2021 AU (Note: The 2021 Super Rugby season was split into two competitions: The 2021 Super Rugby AU season and Super Rugby Trans-Tasman.)	4th	8	3	0	5	178	182	−4	4	16	
2021 TT	9th	5	0	0	5	95	215	−120	0	0	
2022	10th	14	4	0	10	320	469	–149	4	20	
2023	11th	14	4	0	10	406	484	–78	5	21	
2024	8th	14	5	0	9	341	488	–147	6	26	Lost quarter-final to Hurricanes

- Notes:

== Personnel ==
=== Coaches ===
Rebels Super Rugby Coaches
Coach	Tenure	Games	Wins	Losses	Draws	Win %	Finals Appearances	Titles
(Australia) Rod Macqueen	2011	16	3	13	0	19%	None	None
(Australia) Damien Hill	2012–2013	32	9	23	0	28%	None	None
(Australia) Tony McGahan	2014–2017	62	19	42	1	31%	None	None
(South Africa) David Wessels	2018–2021	54	24	29	1	44%	2020 AU	None
(South Africa) Kevin Foote	2021–2024	48	13	35	0	27%	2024	None

As of 9 June 2024.

== Ownership and management ==
=== Board ===
The Melbourne Rebels are the first privately owned professional rugby union team in Australia. During its inauguration, the club was run by a board chaired by majority owner, media and communications millionaire Harold Mitchell. Mitchell stepped down from the role in 2013 and was succeeded by businessman Jonathan Ling as the club's chairman.

The deputy chairman is Fred Hollows Foundation director Bob Dalziel. The other directors are entrepreneur Lyndsey Cattermole, former VRU president Gary Gray, current VRU president Tim North, SC, Aegis Media companies director Rod Lamplugh, Pacific National Rail director Angus McKay, and former Wallaby and the first ever Melbourne Rebels captain, Stirling Mortlock.

On 19 June 2015, the ARU announced that the franchise had been sold to the Melbourne-based Imperium Sports Management (ISM), returning the Rebels to private ownership, with the sale to be formally completed on 1 July. At the time of announcement, Peter Leahy stood down as CEO to allow ISM co-leader Andrew Cox to take that position.

On 4 August 2017, with the threat of the Rebels franchise being 'axed' from Super Rugby, Imperium Sports Management and CEO Andrew Cox relinquished control of the Rebels, transferring its shares at $1 per share to the Victorian Rugby Union. General Manager Baden Stephenson was named the new CEO of the Rebels following Cox's departure.

== Development teams ==
Victorian rugby's two elite development squads just below full-time professional level are the Rebels A and Rebels Under 19 teams. These teams are closely aligned with the Melbourne Rebels and train at the same venues used by the Rebels. The Victorian Rugby Union also owns and manages a team in the National Rugby Championship, the Melbourne Rising.

=== Rebels A ===
The Rebels A team plays matches against interstate and international representative teams, and has also competed in tournaments such as the Pacific Rugby Cup. Known by various names including Rebels A and Rebel Rising, the development teams are selected from emerging talent in Victoria and South Australia. The squads are composed of Rebels contracted players, extended training squad members, Victorian U19s, and selected Dewar Shield club players.

=== Under 19 ===
The Rebels under 19 side plays in the national URC competition. Victorian teams played in the Southern States Tournament until 2015 and also played occasional matches against other representative sides such as Pacific Rugby Cup teams. In 2018, an under 19 age limit was reinstated for the national colts team competition.

== See also ==
- Melbourne Rising
- Ganbatte Trophy
