= Lingering =

Lingering may refer to:

- "Lingering", a 2014 song by Sheppard from the album Bombs Away
- Lingering Pt. I, a 2017 album by Sleep Party People
- Lingering Pt. II, a 2018 album by Sleep Party People
- Lingering (film), a 2020 South Korean horror drama film starring Lee Se-young

== See also ==
- Lingering Garden, Suzhou, Jiangsu, China; a renowned classical Chinese garden
- Linger (disambiguation)
- Ling (disambiguation)
