= Linga Sound =

Linga Sound may refer to:

- Linga Sound, Orkney, between the islands of Linga Holm and Stronsay
- Linga Sound, Shetland, between the islands of Whalsay and West Linga
