= Oedothorax simianensis =

Scientific classification
- Kingdom: Animalia
- Phylum: Arthropoda
- Subphylum: Chelicerata
- Class: Arachnida
- Order: Araneae
- Infraorder: Araneomorphae
- Family: Linyphiidae
- Genus: Oedothorax
- Species: O. simianensis

Binomial name
- Oedothorax simianensis Irfan, Zhang, Cai & Zhang, 2025

Dwarf spider species

Oedothorax simianensis is a species of dwarf spider in the family Linyphiidae, first described in 2025 by Muhammad Irfan, Chang-Cheng Zhang, Yu-Jun Cai, and Zhi-Sheng Zhang. The species is only known from the Simian Shan Mountain Nature Reserve in Chongqing, China.

== Etymology ==
The species name refers to the Simian Mountain (Sìmiàn Shān), the type locality where this species was first collected.

== Diagnostic characteristics ==
Males of Oedothorax simianensis can be recognized by a unique combination of features in their reproductive anatomy. A small structure called the paracymbium, near the male reproductive organ, has a split or forked tip, unlike the simple hook shape seen in related species such as Oedothorax paludigena.

Another key feature is that the protegulum, a flexible structure near the sperm-transferring organ, is also forked at its base, while in other species it remains single.

Additionally, the embolus, the narrow tube that delivers sperm, is relatively short, about half the length of the radix, a supporting structure. In similar species, the embolus is nearly as long as the radix.

These traits help distinguish Oedothorax simianensis from all other known species in the genus.

== Distribution ==
The species is endemic to the Simian Mountain Nature Reserve. It was collected at an altitude of 1002 meters above sea level.

== Habitat ==
The specimen was collected from leaf litter in broad-leaved and coniferous forests, a common habitat for many Linyphiidae spiders.
