= N (Poland) =

2006–2013 Polish satellite service

n
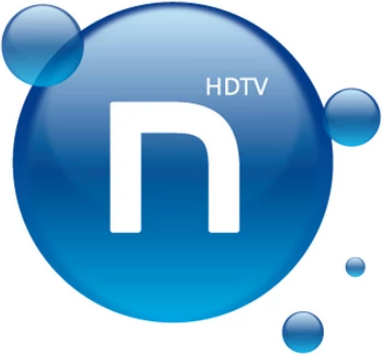
- Type: Private
- Industry: Telecommunication
- Founded: October 12, 2006
- Defunct: March 21, 2013
- Fate: Merged with Cyfra+
- Successor: nc+
- Headquarters: Warsaw, Poland
- Key people: Markus Tellenbach
- Products: Direct-broadcast satellite
- Parent: ITI Neovision
- Website: n.pl

n [ɛn] was a Polish DTH platform. It was launched on October 12, 2006 and owned by ITI Neovision. On December 31, 2011 the company had reached 929,000 subscribers. On March 21, 2013, n merged with Cyfra+ to form nc+.

== History ==
In May 2006, the ITI Group announced the opening of a "new generation" subscription television platform for the autumn of 2006, with TVN and Onet acting as key strategic partners in the upcoming project.

N was unveiled to the public in September 2006, aiming for an October 12 launch date. The platform launched with never-before seen channels in the Polish market, such as BabyTV, Discovery Historia, Discovery HD and Comedy Central, as well as ITI's TVN Lingua and other channels ITI made exclusively for the platform, such as nSPORT and Wojna i Pokój. It was also the first TV provider in Poland to offer video-on-demand and high definition services, as well as DVRs and theme packs. Decoder requests were only possible from October 1.

== Channels ==
At closing time, N had 99 encrypted channels (6 in foreign languages), 23 free-to-air channels in Polish, 34 HDTV channels, and 3 3D channels.

=== In-house channels ===
Throughout its history, N also had its own in-house channels:

- Wojna i Pokój (War and Peace): The channel broadcast movies from the Soviet Union and contemporary Russia, with either Polish voice-over or original Russian audio. Converted to HD in 2012, after which the channel timeshared with Sundance Channel. Shut down in 2013 because of the merger.
- O.TV: Channel run by Jerzy Owsiak, broadcasts started in 2007 and ended in 2009. It later ran as a block on ZigZap until 2010.
- nTALK: Channel focusing on American and Polish talk shows. Started in 2007 and ended in 2009.
- nSPORT: Sports channel. Later integrated into the NC+ offer in 2013 and rebranded in 2014.

== VOD ==
- VOD collections
  - PictureBox – Universal Studios movies
  - nSeriale – CBS Television Studios, NBCUniversal, Buena Vista International, 20th Century Fox Television and TVN's TV series
  - nPremium VOD – movies presented on nFilm HD channels
  - funVOD – set of erotic movies
  - VOD Disney – Disney's series
- Premiery VOD – Warner Bros., Miramax Films, Lions Gate Entertainment, SPI International, Columbia Pictures, 20th Century Fox, DreamWorks, Universal Studios and New Line Cinema movies; unlike VOD collections, every movie in "Premiery VOD" is paid separately
- nVOD net
  - TVN Player
  - HBO on Demand
  - National Geographic Channel
  - BabyTV

== Set-top boxes ==
As for 2012 n offers four set-top boxes to their subscribers. Most notably, it is the only DTH platform in Poland that doesn't provide CI modules to use with generic DVB-S2 receivers.

Name	HD	EPG	VOD	PVR	Internet access	Internet Radio	Games	Multiroom
nbox HDTV (ADB 5800S)	✓	✓	✗	✗	✓	✓	✗	✓ (Secondary/Slave)
nbox HDTV recorder (ADB 5800SX)	✓	✓	✓ (HDD only)	✓ 250 GB* (80 GB for records) (*170 GB reserved for VOD)	✓	✓	✗	✗
nbox HDTV recorder Turbo (ADB 5720SX)	✓	✓	✓ (HDD + online)	✓ 500 GB* (330 GB for records) 1 TB* (830 GB for records) (*170 GB reserved for VOD)	✓	✓	✓	✓ (Primary/Master)
nbox HD (ADB 2850ST)	✓	✓	✓ (online only)	✓ PVR-ready (up to 1 TB)	✓	✓	✗	✓ (Secondary/Slave)
