= Lingas =

Lingas may refer to:

- Linga, plural lingas, a symbol in Hinduism
- Lingas River, a river in France, tributary of the Dourbie
- 26210 Lingas, an asteroid
- Bjarne Lingås (1933–2011), Norwegian boxer

== See also ==
- Linga (disambiguation)
