= Notolinga =

Scientific classification
- Kingdom: Animalia
- Phylum: Arthropoda
- Subphylum: Chelicerata
- Class: Arachnida
- Order: Araneae
- Infraorder: Araneomorphae
- Family: Linyphiidae
- Genus: Notolinga; Lavery & Dupérré, 2019
- Species: N. fuegiana

Binomial name
- Notolinga fuegiana (Simon, 1902)

Genus of spiders

Notolinga is a monotypic genus of South American sheet weavers containing the single species, Notolinga fuegiana. It is a replacement name for Linga, already in use by a genus of molluscs. Eugène Simon described the first female in 1902 under the name "Neriene fuegiana", but the first male was not described until 2019. It has only been found in Argentina and on the Falkland Islands.

== See also ==
- Neriene
- Oedothorax
