= Oedothorax trilobatus =

Scientific classification
- Kingdom: Animalia
- Phylum: Arthropoda
- Subphylum: Chelicerata
- Class: Arachnida
- Order: Araneae
- Infraorder: Araneomorphae
- Family: Linyphiidae
- Genus: Oedothorax
- Species: O. trilobatus

Binomial name
- Oedothorax trilobatus (Banks, 1896)

Species of spider

Oedothorax trilobatus is a species of dwarf spider in the family Linyphiidae. It is found in the United States, Canada, and Russia.
