= Ling =

Ling may refer to:

== Fictional characters ==
- Ling, an ally of James Bond's from the film You Only Live Twice
- Ling, a fictional character from the Mulan series
- Ling, a playable character from the mobile game Mobile Legends: Bang Bang
- Ling Bouvier, a fictional character from The Simpsons
- Ling Woo, a fictional character from Ally McBeal
- Ling Xiaoyu, a fictional character from the Tekken series
- Ling Yao, a character from the manga series Fullmetal Alchemist and its 2009 anime adaptation Fullmetal Alchemist: Brotherhood
- Bàba, Māma, and Gwen Ling, characters from American Dad!

== Fish ==
- Atlantic cod, formerly called ling when salted
- Blue ling (Molva dypterygia)
- Burbot (Lota lota) or freshwater ling
- Cobia (Rachycentron canadum)
- Common ling (Molva molva)
- Pink cusk-eel (Genypterus blacodes), pink ling or northern ling

== Plants ==
- Calluna, a flowering plant in the heather family
- Water caltrop or ling nut

== Religion ==
- Ling (Chinese religion), the notion of the sacred in Chinese religions
- Lingam or ling, a representation of the Hindu deity Shiva

== Other uses ==
- Ling (surname), a surname of various origins
- Ling (bell), a form of bell
- County magistrate or xian ling, a government official in imperial China
- Lings Wood Nature Reserve, or Lings, Northampton, England

== See also ==
- -ling, an English diminutive suffix
- Ling-Ling (disambiguation)
- Gesar of Ling, mythical Tibetan culture-hero
- Linga (disambiguation)
- Linh (Vietnamese religion), is the notion of the sacred in Vietnamese religions, and the Vietnamese pronunciation of the Chinese character 靈
- Linh, a Vietnamese surname
- Luing, an island of the Inner Hebrides of Scotland
  - Luing cattle which originate from the island
