= Ganbatte Trophy =

Rugby union award

The Ganbatte Trophy was a silver cup presented to the winner of any rugby union match between the Melbourne Rebels team from Australia and the Sunwolves team from Japan. The word Ganbatte (Japanese: 頑張って, "Do your best") is often used as an exhortation at Japanese sporting events meaning to "Go for it!" or to strive.

== History ==
The Melbourne Rebels recruited Japanese international players Shota Horie in 2013, followed by Keita Inagaki, Male Sau, and Kotaro Matsushima. The club was the first in Australia to launch a website in the Japanese language. In 2016, following the introduction of the Sunwolves team to the Super Rugby competition, the Ganbatte Trophy was inaugurated to mark the relationship between the Rebels and Japanese rugby. The Rebels won the trophy on 5 of the 6 occasions the trophy was contested, with the Sunwolves solitary win coming in February 2020. The 7th and final contesting of the trophy scheduled for March 2020 was cancelled due to the COVID-19 pandemic, with the Sunwolves being disbanded in June 2020 following the cancellation of the 2020 Super Rugby season.

== Results ==
=== Overview ===
| Details | Played | Won by Rebels | Won by Sunwolves | Drawn | Rebels points | Sunwolves points |
|---|---|---|---|---|---|---|
| In Australia | 2 | 2 | 0 | 0 | 82 | 28 |
| In Japan | 4 | 3 | 1 | 0 | 151 | 69 |
| Overall | 6 | 5 | 1 | 0 | 233 | 97 |

=== List ===
- (Brackets) denotes total matches the shield was held.

| No. | Season | Date | Venue | Score | Winner | Attendance | Ref. |
|---|---|---|---|---|---|---|---|
| 1 | 2016 | 19 March | Chichibunomiya Stadium, Aoyama, Tokyo | 9–35 | Melbourne Rebels (1) | 16,444 | |
| 2 | 2018 | 3 March | Chichibunomiya Stadium, Aoyama, Tokyo | 17–37 | Melbourne Rebels (2) | 11,181 | |
| 3 | 2018 | 25 May | Melbourne Rectangular Stadium, Olympic Park, Victoria | 40–13 | Melbourne Rebels (3) | 7,853 | |
| 4 | 2019 | 6 April | Melbourne Rectangular Stadium, Olympic Park, Victoria | 42–15 | Melbourne Rebels (4) | —N/a | |
| 5 | 2019 | 25 May | Chichibunomiya Stadium, Aoyama, Tokyo | 7–52 | Melbourne Rebels (5) | —N/a | |
| 6 | 2020 | 1 February | Level-5 Stadium, Hakata-ku, Fukuoka | 36–27 | Sunwolves (1) | 10,426 | |
| —N/a | 2020 | ~~20 March~~ | ~~Melbourne Rectangular Stadium, Olympic Park, Victoria~~ | Cancelled (§ COVID-19 pandemic) | | | |

== See also ==
- Super Rugby
- Melbourne Rebels
- Sunwolves
- Rugby union trophies and awards
