= James Sik Hung Ling =

Dr. James Sik Hung Ling 凌錫洪 D.Min., B.D
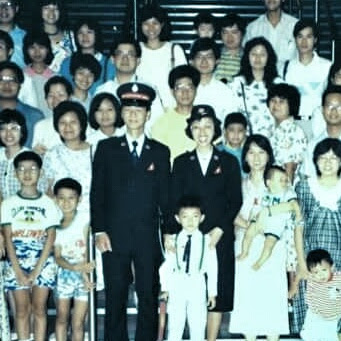
- James Ling (centre in uniform) with wife Fona and son Samuel; bidding farewell to friends at Kai Tak Airport before they set off to their appointment in Sydney

General Secretary Officers of The Salvation Army

Personal details
- Born: 25 September 1951 Hong Kong
- Died: 15 November 2001 (aged 50) Hong Kong
- Spouse: Fona Ling
- Children: Samuel Ling
- Education: Chinese University of Hong Kong / Reformed Theological Seminary
- Occupation: Salvation Army Officer
- Profession: Pastor

James Sik Hung Ling, D.Min, B.D, J.P (凌錫洪; 25 September 1951 – 15 November 2001) was a leader in the Christian community of Hong Kong. He pastored multiple congregations and was the General Secretary of the Salvation Army Hong Kong and Macau Command

== Personal life ==
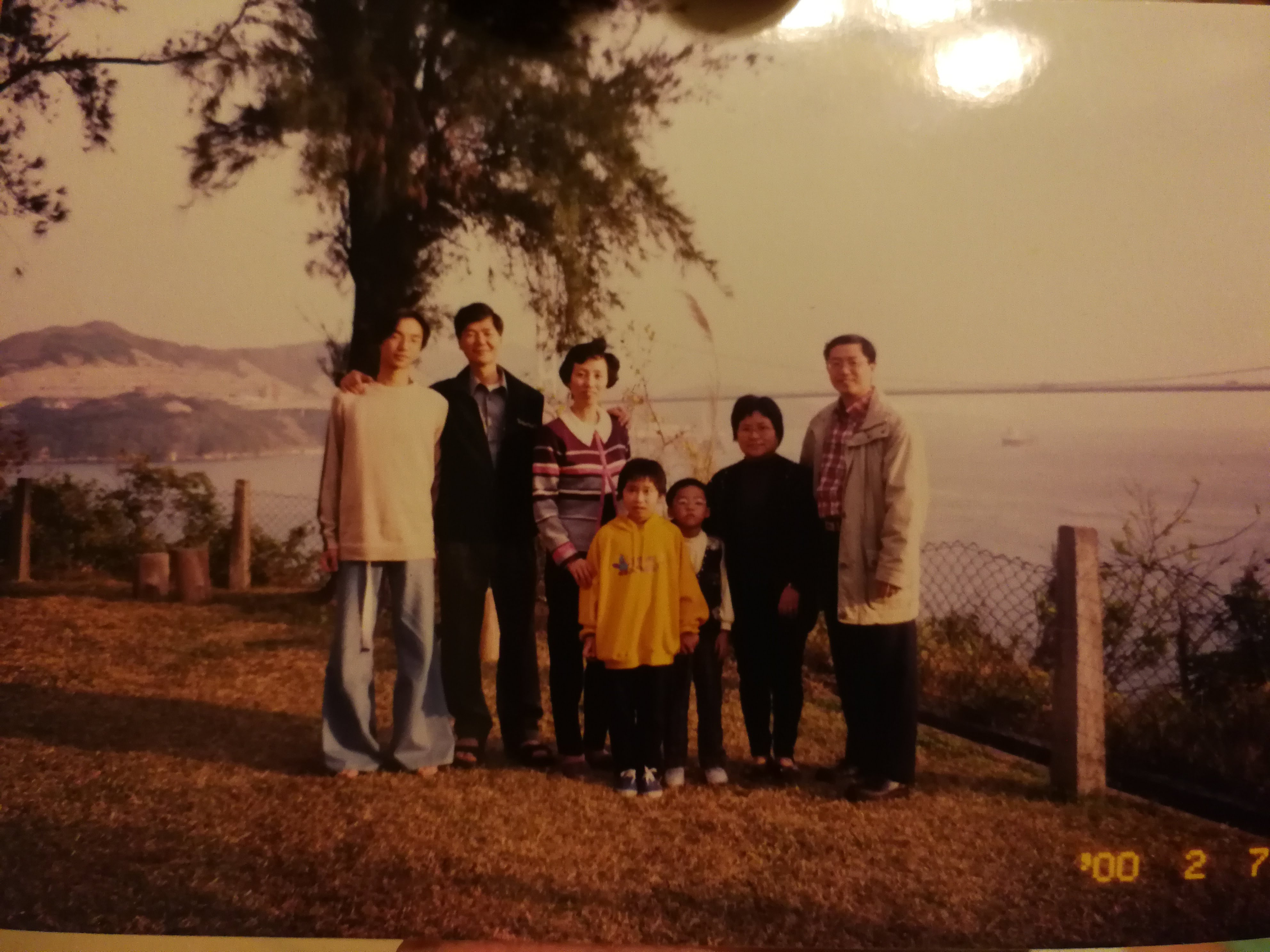
James (2nd Left) with his family in their yard

Ling was born on September 25, 1951, in Hong Kong; he was the son of a headmaster who brought his family to Hong Kong after the Chinese Civil War. James attended Chung Chi College of The Chinese University of Hong Kong and received his Bachelor of Divinity in 1981; he obtained his Doctor of Ministry from the Reformed Theological Seminary in 1996.

He met his wife, Fona, at a Christian crusade. They both entered ministry and has a son named Samuel.

== Ministry ==
Ling's father was a devout Christian, and his family spent a large portion of his childhood at the local Salvation Army corps. He accepted Christ at a young age and was an active Salvationist; he was an enthusiastic Youth leader and a bandsman in the Salvation Army brass band.

He accepted God's calling in the 1970s and entered the Salvation Army's Training College. After graduation, he was ordained to serve in multiple Corps; including founding the William Booth Corps in 1983.

In 1987, he was commissioned to Australia to pastor the Sydney Chinese Corps where there was a growing Hong Kong migrant population; he was appointed as a JP during this tenure for his humanitarian efforts.

Ling came back to Hong Kong in the 1990s, and served multiple appointments including: the Field Secretary coordinating the Christian ministries in HK and Macau, the Social Services Secretary overseeing >100 social service units and centers, and subsequently the General Secretary.

In his early career; Ling had a special interest in Christian apologetics especially in the defence against Christian cults in HK. He later became more involved in education and frequently lectured at the Chinese University of Hong Kong, Bible Seminary of Hong Kong, Alliance Bible Seminary, China Graduate School of Theology.

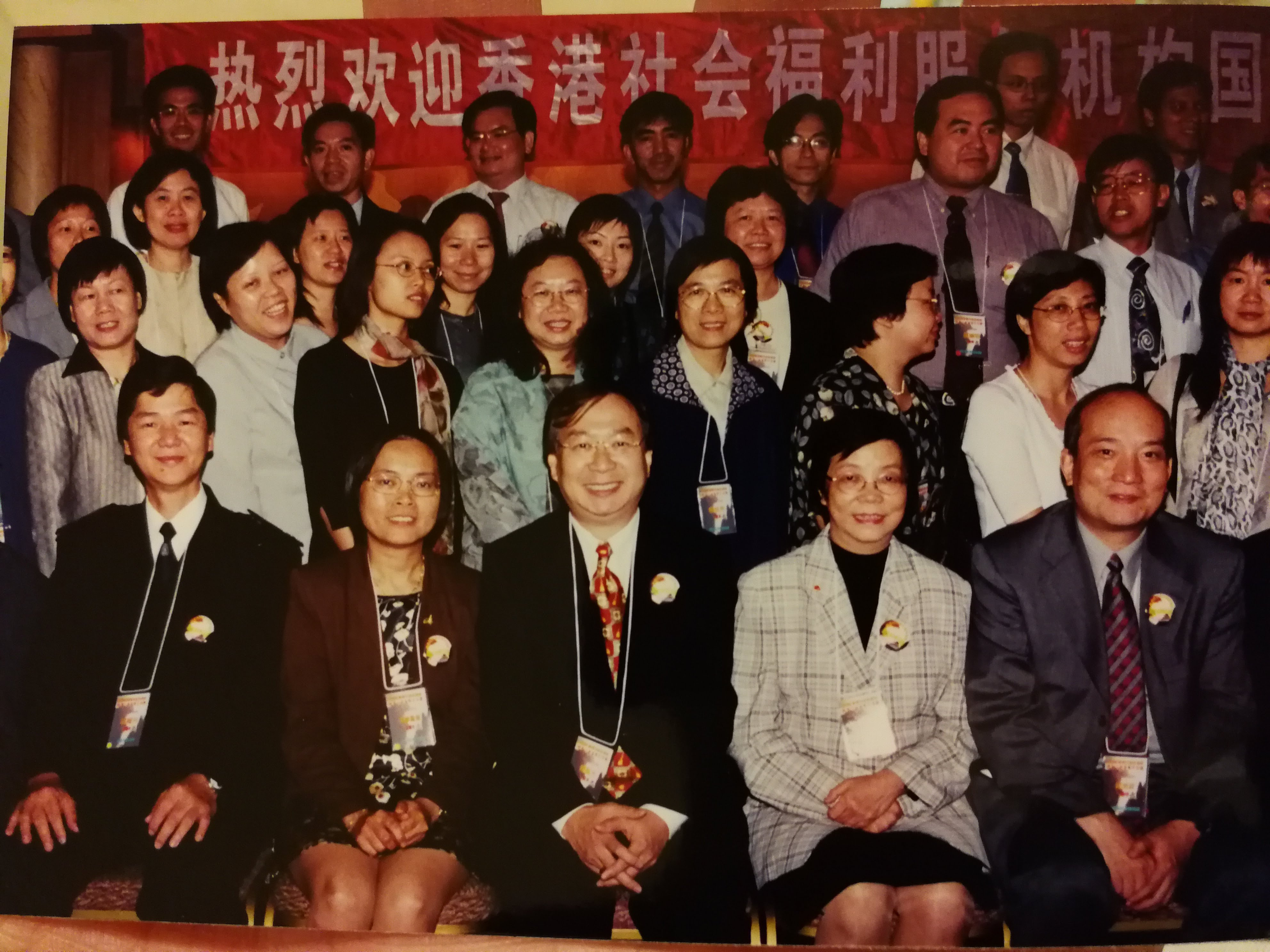
James (1st Left) with the HK Social Service Delegation visiting China

== Death ==
Ling's life came to an early end when he was Promoted to Glory on 15 November 2001 after a multi-year battle with recurrent nasopharyngeal carcinoma.

As a remembrance, the Kiwanis club dedicated a 'Major James Ling Memorial Community Service Award - 香港國際同濟會紀念凌錫洪少校社區服務獎' to secondary school students whom have distinguished themselves in community service.
