= Lingga =

Lingga may refer to:

- Lingga, Malaysia, a small town in Sarawak, Malaysia
  - Lingga (state constituency)
- Lingga Regency a group of islands in Indonesia
  - Lingga Island
- Lingga, Simpang Empat, Karo Regency, Indonesia

== See also ==
- Linga (disambiguation)
- Johor Sultanate, sometimes known as Johor-Riau-Lingga, 1528–1855
- Riau-Lingga Sultanate, 1824–1911
