= Ling Ling =

Ling Ling, Ling-Ling, or Lingling may refer to:

== Places ==
- Lingling, the former name of Yongzhou, a city in the Hunan province of China
  - Lingling District, under the administration of Yongzhou

== People ==
- Lingling (born 1997), member of the Japanese idol group BiSH
- Ling Ling (aka Billy Harlem) (1957-1991), Chinese-American Painter
- Ling Ling Chang (born 1976), California State Senator
- Liu Lingling (Singaporean host) (born 1963), Singaporean host and singer
- Liu Lingling (gymnast) (born 1994), Chinese trampoline gymnast
- Pan Lingling (born 1970), Singaporean actress
- Song Lingling (born 1996), Chinese Paralympic swimmer
- Tse Ling-ling (born 1956), Chinese actress

=== Characters ===
- A character in the animated TV series Drawn Together
- A fictional violin virtuoso created by Australian YouTuber duo Brett Yang and Eddy Chen, also known as TwoSet Violin
- The lead character from the 1933 Chinese silent film Daybreak

== Pandas ==
- Ling-Ling, of Ling-Ling and Hsing-Hsing, two giant pandas given to the United States by China in 1972
- Ling Ling (giant panda) (1985–2008), oldest panda in Japan before it died in 2008

== Tropical cyclones ==
- Typhoon Lingling (2001) affected the Philippines and Vietnam
- Tropical Storm Lingling (2007)
- Tropical Storm Lingling (2014), affected the Philippines
- Typhoon Lingling (2019)

== Other ==
- Lingling dialect, an unclassified mixed Chinese dialect

== See also ==
- Lingling-o, a type of pendant associated with late Neolithic to late Iron Age Austronesian cultures
- Linlin, a Japanese singer and former member of Morning Musume
