= Linger (surname) =

Linger is a surname. Notable people with the surname include:

- Andreas Linger (born 1981), Austrian luger
- Carl Linger (1810–1862), German Australian composer
- Christian Nicolaus von Linger (1669–1755), Prussian general of artillery
- James Linger (born 1990), Australian baseball player
- Ortwin Linger (1967–1989), Dutch-Surinamese footballer
- Paul Linger (born 1974), English footballer
- Wolfgang Linger (born 1982), Austrian luger
