= Linh =

Linh is a Vietnamese name that means "soul" or "spirit". It is the Vietnamese pronunciation of the Chinese character 靈 (líng), which is not used as a surname in China.

== Surname ==
- Linh Quang Viên (1918–2013), Vietnamese soldier who rose to the rank of Lieutenant General in the Army of the Republic of Vietnam

=== Fictional characters ===
- Chase Linh, from Need for Speed: Undercover
- Linh Cinder, protagonist of The Lunar Chronicles by Marissa Meyer
- Linh Song, teen character from Shannon Messenger's book series Keeper of the Lost Cities

== Given name ==
- Linh, a fictitious Vietnamese-American woman in the HBO TV series Treme
- Linh Dinh, Vietnamese-American poet
- Chế Linh, Vietnamese pop singer
- Linh Nga, Vietnamese actress
- Thai Van Linh, businesswoman

== See also ==
- Ling (surname)
