= Ling Zihan =

Chinese business executive

- Born: 1987 (age 38–39)
- Education: Peking University's School of Government; University of Florida; Emlyon Business School
- Occupations: business executive entrepreneur
- Known for: 30 young businesswomen around the world by BBC
- Title: TechBase (founder)

Ling Zihan (Chinese: 凌子涵; pinyin: Líng Zihán; born 1987) is a Chinese business executive and entrepreneur. In 2015, she founded TechBase, a Beijing company designed to encourage women to create online technology enterprises, the first of its kind in China. She was selected by the BBC as one of 30 young businesswomen around the world highlighted by their "30 Under 30" initiative.

== Biography ==
After graduating from Peking University's School of Government in 2008, Ling went on to earn a masters in international business from the University of Florida in 2009 before becoming an exchange student at the Emlyon Business School in Lyon, France. Thereafter, she worked in marketing and strategic management in various Chinese companies including Changyou and Baidu. She became a key member of Lean In Beijing, a foundation established by Sheryl Sandberg to empower young professional women. While contributing to a mentoring project there, she discovered many female graduates were interested in starting online businesses. As a result, she was inspired to found TechBase where women could develop their technological potential.

One of the main problems for young women was that they were less likely than men to obtain start-up funding. She realized that unless they became proficient in the internet, their future would be at risk. On founding Techbase in 2015, she immediately organized "Her Start Ups", an entrepreneurial competition attracting almost 100 participating teams for which she managed to acquire financial and technical support by visiting enterprises. She succeeded in raising 50 million yuan (U.S. $7.7 million) in venture capital.

The firm now has ties with over 50 investment companies and service organizations ready to help women start their own businesses. As of June 2016, the successful 2015 "Her Startup" competition was scheduled to be repeated in Beijing as well as in other large Chinese cities.

== Awards and recognition ==
In November 2015, Ling was included in the BBC's "30 Under 30" initiative which highlighted successful women entrepreneurs. She was also included as one of Forbes' 2015 Asian "30 Under 30" social entrepreneurs.
