= TVN Lingua =

- Country: Poland
- Broadcast area: Poland
- Network: TVN

Programming
- Picture format: 576i (4:3 SDTV)

Ownership
- Owner: TVN Group

History
- Launched: 16 October 2006; 20 years ago
- Closed: 15 July 2009; 17 years ago

TVN Lingua was a Polish television channel owned by TVN, the television arm of the ITI Group. Created in 2006 as part of TVN-ITI's drive for new channels with the launch of the n satellite platform platform, the channel delivered language learning programs, both original and acquired. It closed on July 15, 2009 due to low ratings, a side effect of low distribution.

== History ==
TVN issued a license request to the National Broadcasting Council in June 2006; this would become the first language learning channel in Poland. The channel was announced in late September 2006; channel director Urszula Majewska announced that the channel would launch as part of the then-upcoming n platform, four days after its launch (n launched on 12 October and TVN Lingua on 16 October).

When the channel launched, it only provided English learning programming, though it would add German, French, Spanish and Italian over time. It launched with ten original programs, such as Spikerzy z licencją na nauczanie, the entertainment-based Party to Learn, Lesson With a Star, which featured interviews with celebrities interspersed with segments of their work, the prank-based Worldwise and a program with erotic undertones, Zabawy z języczkiem. The channel also aired international programming, such as Ali G, Fur TV and the British version of Big Brother. There were also British sitcoms such as Smack the Pony and French and Saunders.

On 15 October 2008, the channel, alongside Religia.tv, launched on Cyfra+. These were removed on 6 January 2009.

ITI announced the closure of the channel on 1 April 2009. The justification behind the decision was the fact that TVN launched new channels that, if they had good performance over an initial two-year window, they would continue. However, the project could not be deemed profitable for the group. The channel closed on 15 July.
