= Linga Sound, Orkney =

Strait between Linga Holm and Stronsay in the Orkney islands of Scotland

Coordinates: 59.141563°N 2.661438°W

Location of Linga Sound in Orkney

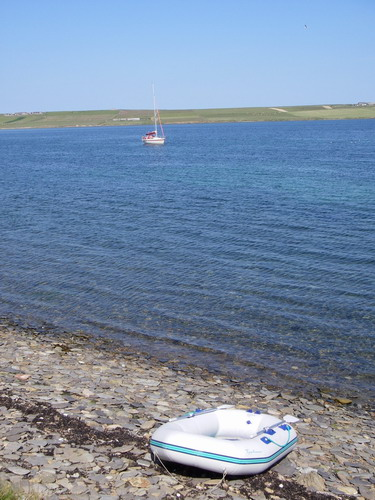
Linga Sound from Linga

Linga Sound is the strait between the islands of Linga Holm and Stronsay in the Orkney islands of Scotland. It leads into St. Catherines Bay from the north.

The sound is 4 fathoms (24 ft; 7.3 m) deep. The northern entrance is very narrow. Linga Sound and St. Catherines Bay form a safe harbor, but it is difficult to enter. The land on both sides of Linga sound is low and sloping, so the entrance is hard to pick out at night. There are reports of the long-finned pilot whale being shot with a rifle in the sound around 1880. An 1891 account said that Linga Holm was no longer inhabited, and was used only for sheep. There was abundant bird life. Today, grey seals haul out on Linga Holm in large number in October. About 2,000 pups are born on the Holm each year. The coarse grass also provides grazing for greylag geese.
