= Charles Ling =

Computer scientist

Charles X. Ling (Chinese name: 凌晓峰) is a computer scientist who specializes in research on Data Mining and Machine Learning.

He obtained his BSc from Shanghai Jiao Tong University in 1985, and PhD from University of Pennsylvania in 1989.

He is currently a professor in the Department of Computer Science, and Science Distinguished Research Professor, at the University of Western Ontario, Canada. He has published over 150 refereed papers in international journals and conferences. He is a Senior member of IEEE.

He is co-author of book Crafting Your Research Future - A Guide to Successful Master's and Ph.D. Degrees in Science & Engineering.

He also does research and development in child gifted education, deriving from his work on artificial intelligence and cognitive science.

== Bibliography ==
- IEEE Canada
- NRC-IIT
