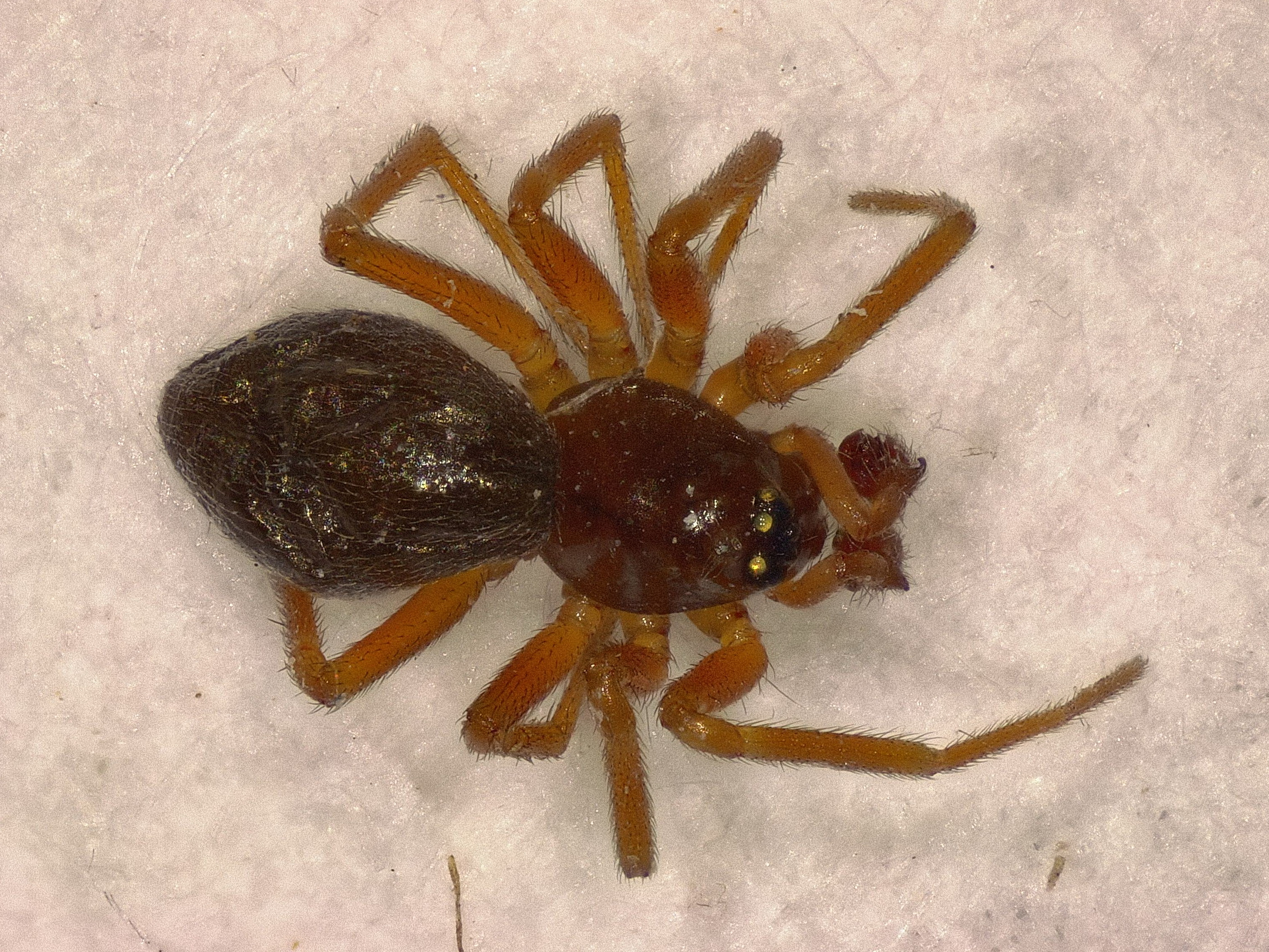
- O. apicatus, male

Scientific classification
- Kingdom: Animalia
- Phylum: Arthropoda
- Subphylum: Chelicerata
- Class: Arachnida
- Order: Araneae
- Infraorder: Araneomorphae
- Family: Linyphiidae
- Genus: Oedothorax; Bertkau, 1883

Type species
- O. gibbosus (Blackwall, 1841)

Species
- 38, see text

= Oedothorax =

Genus of spiders

Oedothorax is a genus of dwarf spiders that was first described by A. Förster & Philipp Bertkau in 1883.

== Species ==
As of June 2025 it contains thirty-nine species and one subspecies:

- O. agrestis (Blackwall, 1853) – Europe, Russia (Europe to South Siberia)
  - Oedothorax agrestis longipes (Simon, 1884) – Switzerland
- O. annulatus Wunderlich, 1974 – Nepal
- O. apicatus (Blackwall, 1850) – Europe, Turkey, Caucasus, Russia (Europe to South Siberia), Kazakhstan, Iran, Central Asia, China
- O. banksi Strand, 1906 – USA (Alaska)
- O. biantu Zhao & Li, 2014 – China
- O. bifoveatus Tanasevitch, 2017 – Malaysia (Borneo), Indonesia (Java)
- O. cascadeus Chamberlin, 1949 – USA
- O. cheruthoniensis Domichan & Sunil Jose, 2021 – India
- O. collinus Ma & Zhu, 1991 – China
- O. cruciferoides Tanasevitch, 2020 – Nepal
- O. cunur Tanasevitch, 2015 – India
- O. dubius Caporiacco, 1935 – India (Karakorum)
- O. fuscus (Blackwall, 1834) – Azores, Europe, North Africa
- O. gibbifer (Kulczyński, 1882) – Europe
- O. gibbosus (Blackwall, 1841) (type) – Europe, Turkey, Russia (Europe to South Siberia)
- O. howardi Petrunkevitch, 1925 – USA
- O. japonicus Kishida, 1910 – Japan
- O. khasi Tanasevitch, 2017 – India
- O. kodaikanal Tanasevitch, 2015 – India
- O. limatus Crosby, 1905 – USA
- O. mangsima Tanasevitch, 2020 – Nepal
- O. meghalaya Tanasevitch, 2015 – India
- O. meridionalis Tanasevitch, 1987 – Caucasus, Russia (Caucasus, Central Asia), Iran, Central Asia
- O. myanmar Tanasevitch, 2017 – Myanmar
- O. nazareti Scharff, 1989 – Ethiopia
- O. paludigena Simon, 1926 – Spain, France (incl. Corsica), Italy (incl. Sardinia), Albania, Greece
- O. paracymbialis Tanasevitch, 2015 – India
- O. retusus (Westring, 1851) – Europe, Turkey, Caucasus, Russia (Europe to north-eastern Siberia), Kazakhstan, China, India?
- O. sexmaculatus Saito & Ono, 2001 – Japan
- O. sohra Tanasevitch, 2020 – Nepal
- O. stylus Tanasevitch, 2015 – India
- O. simianensis Irfan, Zhang, Cai & Zhang, 2025 – China (Chongqing)
- O. tingitanus (Simon, 1884) – Spain, Morocco, Algeria, Tunisia
- O. trilineatus Saito, 1934 – Japan
- O. trilobatus (Banks, 1896) – USA, Canada, Russia (Kamchatka)
- O. unciger Tanasevitch, 2020 – Nepal
- O. uncus Tanasevitch, 2015 – India
- O. uncus Domichan & Sunil Jose, 2021 – India
