= Anthony Ling =

Welsh cricketer

Personal information
- Full name: Anthony John Patrick Ling
- Born: 10 August 1910; Skewen, Glamorgan, Wales
- Died: 12 January 1987 (aged 76); Eastbourne, Sussex, England
- Batting: Left-handed
- Role: Batsman

Domestic team information
- Years: Team
- 1934–36: Glamorgan
- 1939: Somerset
- First-class debut: 19 May 1934 Glamorgan v Cambridge University
- Last First-class: 25 July 1939 Somerset v Derbyshire

Career statistics
Competition	First-class
Matches	14
Runs scored	256
Batting average	16.00
100s/50s	–/–
Top score	41*
Balls bowled	12
Wickets	–
Bowling average	–
5 wickets in innings	–
10 wickets in match	–
Best bowling	0/5
Catches/stumpings	2/–
- Source: CricketArchive, 7 November 2010

Anthony John Patrick Ling (10 August 1910 – 12 January 1987) played first-class cricket for Glamorgan and Somerset between 1934 and 1939. He was born at Skewen, Glamorgan and died at Eastbourne, Sussex.

Ling was a left-handed middle or lower-order batsman. He was educated at Stowe School and played Minor Counties cricket for Wiltshire from 1928. In 1934, he was given a trial of eight matches for Glamorgan which was looking for Welsh-born cricketers: an average of 23 runs per innings indicates that he was quite successful, but his highest score was only 41, an unbeaten innings in the match against Leicestershire at Swansea. Though he played other matches for Glamorgan's second eleven, he made only one further first-class appearance in a single match in 1936.

In July 1939, having moved to the West of England for business, Ling played in five consecutive matches for Somerset, but without success.

In his obituary in Wisden Cricketers' Almanack, he was misnamed as "Arthur" Ling.
