= Lunger (surname) =

Lunger is a surname. Notable people with the surname include:

- Arnold Lunger (20th century), Italian luger
- Brett Lunger (born 1945), American racecar driver
- Hansjörg Lunger (born 1964), Italian ski mountaineer
- Jane du Pont Lunger (1914–2001), American heiress
- Tamara Lunger (born 1986), Italian ski mountaineer
