= Lingua.ly =

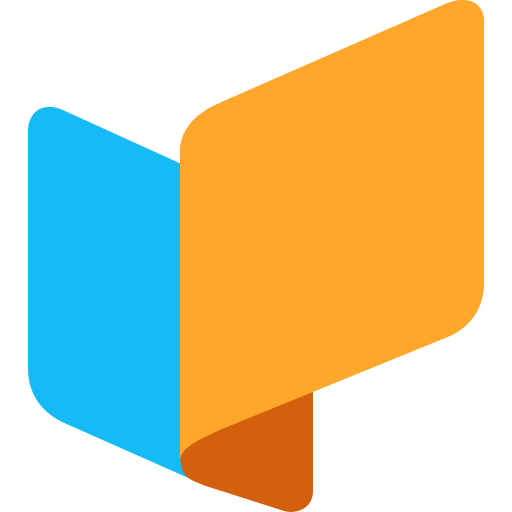
- Lingua.ly logo
- Website type: Online education
- Available in: English, Spanish, French, Hebrew, Arabic, Italian, German, Chinese (simplified), Chinese (traditional), Portuguese, Russian, Turkish, Dutch, Japanese, Greek, Korean, Polish, Czech; Available to learn; American English, Spanish, French, Hebrew, Arabic, Russian, Italian, German, Portuguese, Dutch
- Website: lingua.ly
- Registration: Free
- Current status: Defunct

Lingua.ly was an EdTech startup that took a digital language immersion approach to teaching languages. The company was founded by Jan Ihmels and Orly Furhman, two academics from Cambridge and Stanford respectively. Lingua.ly operated under the freemium business model and existed as a Cloud-based web app and mobile app available for Android and iOS.

== Launch ==
After its beta launch in August 2013, the company's extension for Google Chrome saw widespread early adoption in the US, Spain, and Latin America as a spaced repetition vocabulary acquisition tool. Several publications have recommended Lingua.ly as a free platform for language learning.

In April 2014 Lingua.ly launched its mobile app for Android, achieving 100K downloads in its first month on the Google Play Store. Lingua.ly released a stand-alone web app in June 2014, which was met with largely positive reviews, including coverage in the New York Times. Most recently, Lingua.ly released an iOS mobile app in July 2014, which was quickly listed as one of the top iPhone apps of the week.

In February 2014 the company won the regional 1776 Challenge Cup's Innovation in Education Award for its patent pending algorithm and language learning platform. In May 2014 Lingua.ly was selected as one of eight global finalists for the Challenge Cup.

== Approach ==
While traditional language immersion entails a target language rich environment where the user is exposed to ample linguistic input from various sources, Lingua.ly utilizes digital language immersion, a method of employing a virtual learning environment to simulate the language learning environment. Users are exposed to authentic input in their target language through their computer, tablet, or mobile device as opposed to lesson-based instruction. Duolingo is another example of language education tech startups that also partially relies on a digital language immersion approach. In classroom learning, language immersion is often used to teach children in bilingual or content and language integrated learning programs. Digital language immersion is the E-learning extension of these trends.

Lingua.ly relies on a number of applied linguistics principles, including the Natural Approach and Krashen's Input Hypothesis, which argues that fluent language learners benefit most from language they acquire through exposure rather than direct instruction.

== Technology and platform ==
Lingua.ly's platform contains an online and mobile dictionary powered by Babylon that learners can use to look up words from the web in their target language. Through a learner's collected words and click-patterns, the technology maps an individual's vocabulary in the target language. It then rates the suitability of online content suggestions in the target language in order to create an environment for language acquisition based on a 90:10 percentage of known to unknown words. Users customize vocabulary flashcards with images, audio, and example sentences and practice them at spaced repetition intervals to enhance acquisition and transfer into long-term memory.

== EdTech for languages ==
Lingua.ly is part of a growing trend of digital language education startups including, Memrise, Busuu, Babbel and Duolingo that are attracting significant investment funding and unseating former industry leader Rosetta Stone.

== Shutdown ==
In October 2016, the Linugua.ly Facebook account posted a message announcing that they were shifting their business focus and would "no longer be able to maintain our current line of products."

== See also ==
- Language education
- Language pedagogy
- Computer-assisted language learning
- List of Language Self-Study Programs
