= Jonathan Ling =

Australian businessman (born 1954-)

Jonathan Peter Ling (born c. 1954) is an Australian businessman and the former chief executive officer (CEO) of Fletcher Building, a New Zealand construction company and one of the largest companies in New Zealand. He joined the company in 2003. His appointment as CEO was announced in May 2006, and he took up the position in September 2006. He announced his retirement in June 2012, effective in September. Following his retirement, he returned to Australia.

Ling was born in Melbourne, and is a fifth-generation Australian descended from migrants who left southern China in 1830. He was educated at Scotch College Melbourne and completed his post-school studies in Melbourne, acquiring a bachelor's degree in mechanical engineeringfrom the University of Melbourne in 1975, and a master's of business administration from RMIT in 1985.
