= History of rugby union matches between Australia and New Zealand =

Australia–New Zealand rugby union rivalry
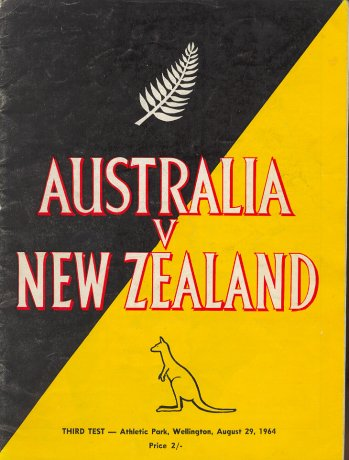
- Magazine cover of Australia's third test on their 1964 tour of New Zealand.
- Other names: Trans-Tasman Rivalry
- Sport: Rugby union
- Location: Australia (Oceania); New Zealand (Oceania)
- Teams: 2
- First meeting: 15 August 1903; 123 years ago; New Zealand 22–3 Australia
- Latest meeting: 17 October 2026; 25 days ago; New Zealand 43–21 Australia
- Next meeting: TBA
- Stadiums: In Australia; In New Zealand
- Trophy: Bledisloe Cup (since 1932)

Statistics
- Total meetings: 183
- Most wins: New Zealand (130)
- Largest victory: 31 October 2020; 6 years ago; Australia 5–43 New Zealand
- Smallest victory: Australia (1) (Note: Both Australia and New Zealand have beaten each other by one-point margins on more than one occasion.); New Zealand (1)
- Largest goal scoring: 19 August 2017; 9 years ago; Australia 34–54 New Zealand
- Longest win streak: New Zealand (13) (Note: 7 August 2021–present)
- Current win streak: New Zealand (13) (Note: 7 August 2021–present)

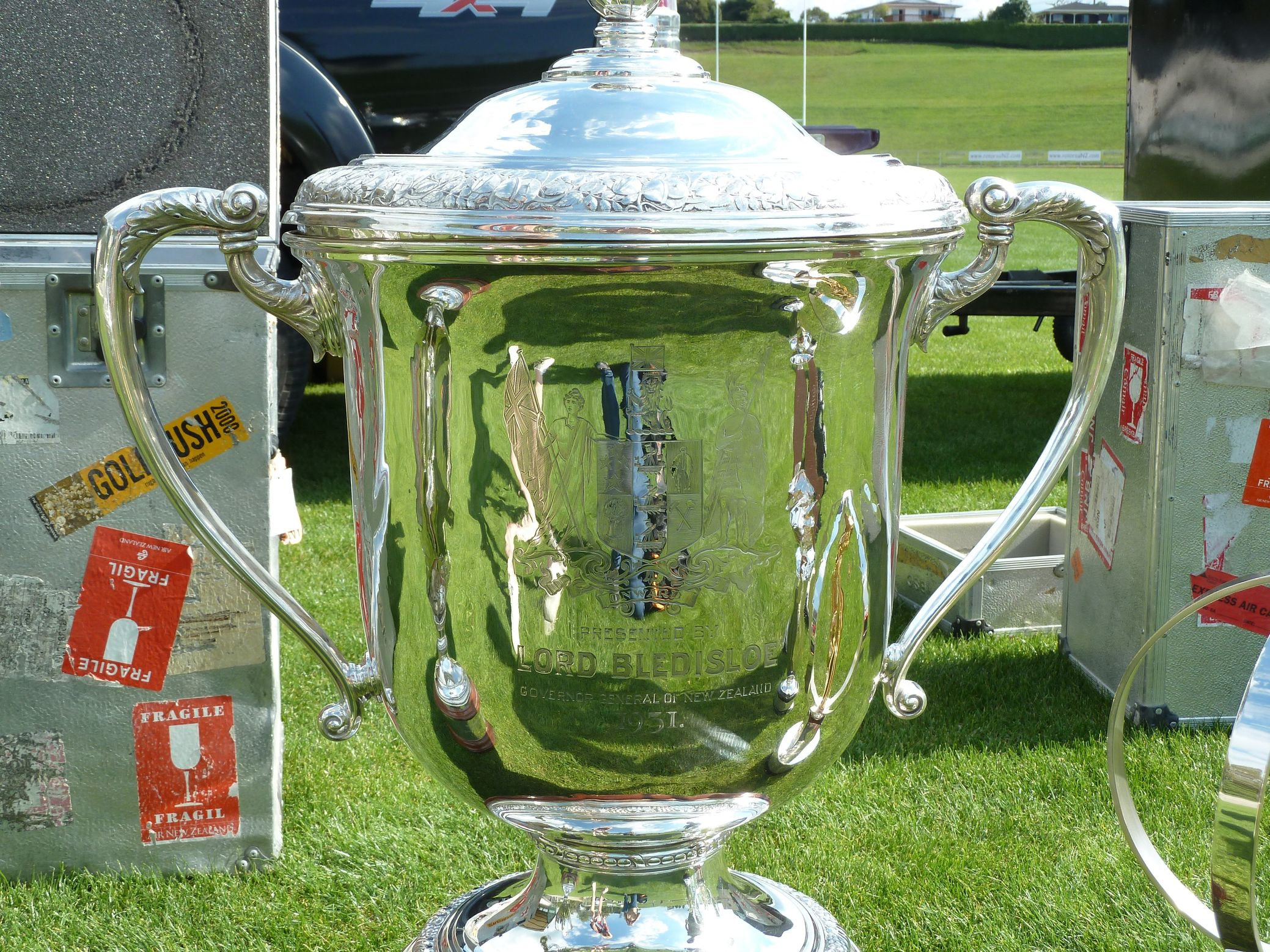
Bledisloe Cup, pictured in 2011.

The first game of rugby union between Australia and New Zealand took place in a test match on 15 August 1903 in Sydney, New South Wales. On that occasion, New Zealand won 22–3.

Since 1931, the overall winner of the annual test matches (between one and three games in any given year) between the All Blacks and the Wallabies takes possession of the Bledisloe Cup, named after Lord Bledisloe, who donated the trophy.

Currently the rivalry is one the most played of any two international rugby union teams, and having played against each other 183 times. The All Blacks lead the series 130 to 45 with 8 draws between them and includes a large number of fixtures recorded for New Zealand as "XV" results.

== Summary ==
The summary below is for all matches where test caps were awarded by both national unions, which leaves out all 24 meetings from 1920 to 1928, in which the governing New Zealand Rugby Union fielded the second level New Zealand XV team rather than the highest All Blacks team. The Australian Rugby Union retroactively awarded test status caps to its own players for those matches.

=== Overall ===
| Details (Note: As of 17 October 2026.) | Played | Won by Australia | Won by New Zealand | Drawn | Australia points | New Zealand points |
|---|---|---|---|---|---|---|
| In Australia | 92 | 28 | 58 | 6 | 1,495 | 2,042 |
| In New Zealand | 84 | 15 | 67 | 2 | 1,077 | 1,961 |
| Neutral venue | 6 | 2 | 4 | 0 | 112 | 152 |
| Overall | 183 | 45 | 130 | 8 | 2,684 | 4,155 |

=== Records ===
Note: Date shown in brackets indicates when the record was or last set.

| Record | Australia | New Zealand |
|---|---|---|
| Longest winning streak | 3 (5 Aug 2000 – 13 Jul 2002) (Note: Australia's longest winning streak against New Zealand is three. This figure has occurred five different times (July 1929, September 1978 – June 1980, October 1991 – July 1992, July 1998 – July 1999, and August 2000 – July 2002).) | 13 (7 Aug 2021 – present) |
Largest points for
| Home | 47 (10 August 2019) | 57 (14 August 2021) |
| Away | 33 (19 October 2013) | 54 (19 August 2017) |
Largest winning margin
| Home | 21 (10 August 2019) (Note: Australia has beaten New Zealand by the same margin (21 points) on two occasions. The first was 28 August 1999.) | 37 (6 July 1996) |
| Away | 15 (29 August 1964) | 38 (31 October 2020) |
Most aggregate points
88 (Australia 34–54 New Zealand) (19 August 2017)

== Tri Nations era (1996–2011) ==
Tri Nations results (1996–2011)
| Team | Wins | W% |
|---|---|---|
| Australia | 11 | 30.56 |
| New Zealand | 25 | 69.44 |
| Draws | —N/a | |
| Total | 36 | |

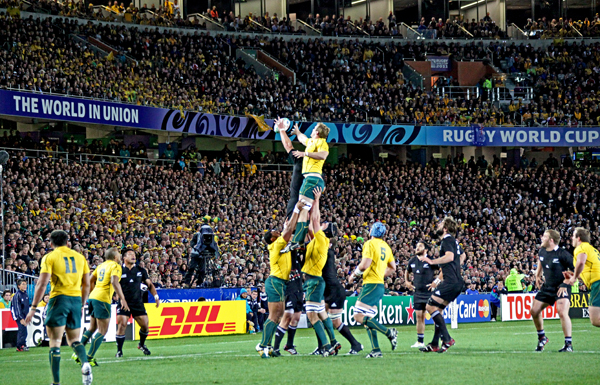
New Zealand and Australia in the semi-final of the 2011 Rugby World Cup.

The professional era in rugby union began in 1995, marked by creation of the SANZAR group (a combination of South Africa, New Zealand and Australia) which was formed with the purpose of selling TV rights for two new competitions, the domestic Super 12 competition and the Tri-Nations.

The first Tri-Nations was contested in 1996, with New Zealand winning all four of their Tests to take the trophy.

In 2000 in Sydney, a record crowd of 109,874 witnessed what some have called 'The Greatest Ever Rugby Match' when the All Blacks defeated The Wallabies 39–35. Twenty one days after their win in Sydney, the All Blacks lost to the Wallabies in front of a home crowd. This meant the Wallabies won The Bledisloe Cup for the third year in a row.

Another one of the most dramatic matches was played on 1 September 2001 at Stadium Australia, in what would be Wallaby great John Eales' last ever test. The Wallabies were hoping to send their skipper off in a grand style. A fairy tale ending was looking possible in the first half as the Wallabies took a 19–6 lead over the All Blacks. However, tries for Doug Howlett and Pita Alatini, along with Andrew Mehrtens kicking, saw the All Blacks back in front 26–22. Then, in the last minutes of the game, number 8 Toutai Kefu scored the winning try for the Wallabies. Two years later in 2003 the Wallabies suffered one of their most humiliating losses, being defeated 21–50 by the All Blacks in Sydney.

In 2008, a Bledisloe Cup match was played in Hong Kong, which New Zealand won 19–14. It was rumoured that the United States and Japan would host future Bledisloe Cup matches, and these rumours proved true in the case of Japan, as Tokyo hosted a 2009 Bledisloe match.

The first two Tests of the 2010 series saw the All Blacks extend their winning streak over the Wallabies to 10 games. (Australia's last previous win came on 26 July 2008 at Sydney.) The third and fourth tests were extremely tight affairs, both being won by late tries. In the Sydney test on 11 September, converted tries by Richie McCaw and Kieran Read in the last 13 minutes allowed the All Blacks to overcome a 9–22 deficit. The win saw New Zealand complete a 100% record in the 2010 Tri-Nations. On 30 October 2010 the sides contested the now-customary fourth annual Bledisloe Cup test at a neutral venue. As in 2009, the match was played in Hong Kong, and as on 11 September the game was won with a dramatic late comeback. On this occasion the Wallabies, having led early in the match, found themselves 19–24 down as the hooter went, but with possession in the All Black 22. The Wallabies recycled through numerous phases of possession, until finally the ball was passed wide to James O'Connor, who beat the scrambling All Black defence to touch down and level the scores. The 20-year-old winger then kicked the resulting conversion to win the match for the Wallabies, ending New Zealand's recent domination of the fixture.

Subsequently, (2011–2014) the All Blacks have won eight of the last eleven games played, with two drawn, continuing their domination. This included a crucial 20–6 victory over the Wallabies in the 2011 World Cup Semi-final to enable to All Blacks to progress to the final and subsequently win the World Cup.

== Rugby Championship era (since 2012) ==
Rugby Championship results (2012–present) (Note: The 2020 edition of the competition did not include South Africa and was called the “Tri Nations Series”.)
| Team | Wins | W% |
|---|---|---|
| Australia | 3 | 13.04 |
| New Zealand | 19 | 82.61 |
| Draws | 1 | —N/a |
| Total | 23 | |

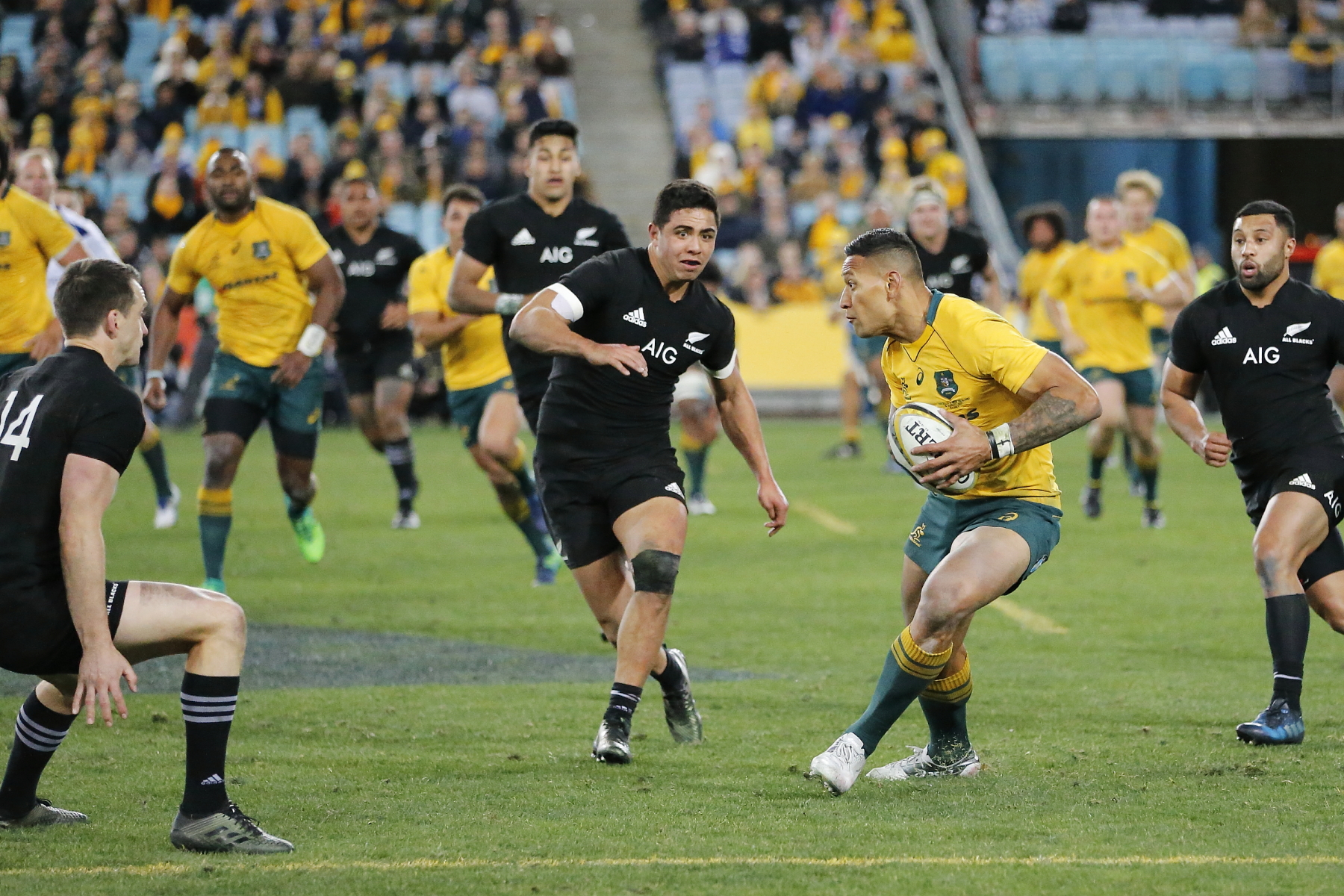
Israel Folau carrying the ball in round one of the 2017 Rugby Championship.

Starting in 2012, the Tri Nations competition was renamed The Rugby Championship and included Argentina.

On 17 August 2013, the All Blacks celebrated their 100th win over the Wallabies with a 47–29 victory in Sydney. After a shock 12–12 draw in Sydney in the first game of the 2014 series, which ended the All Blacks' attempt at the record of eighteen-straight wins for a major rugby nation, the All Blacks posted their highest ever score against Australia with a 51–20 victory at Eden Park on 23 August 2014.

In 2022, Australia and New Zealand fixtures that were regularly organised as three per year, and sometimes four, were reduced to two per year until the end of 2025. Following news of New Zealand's 2026 tour of South Africa, it was revealed that the Rugby Championship would be played biennially from 2025 onward. As the rivalry is expected to return to a three-test series from 2026, the fixture is expected to have an Anzac Day Test match added to their calendar.

== Results ==
=== Pre World War I (1903–1914) ===
The first Test between Australia and New Zealand was played on 15 August 1903 at the Sydney Cricket Ground. Despite the Wallabies losing 22–3 this tour greatly increased the popularity of rugby and large crowds started attending grade matches in Sydney and Brisbane. New Zealand winger Billy Wallace scored thirteen of their twenty-two points.

| No. | Date | Venue | Score | Winner | Competition |
|---|---|---|---|---|---|
| 1 | 15 August 1903 | Sydney Cricket Ground, Sydney | 3–22 | New Zealand | 1903 New Zealand tour of Australia |
| 2 | 2 September 1905 | Tahuna Park, Dunedin | 14–3 | New Zealand | 1905 Australia tour of New Zealand |
| 3 | 20 July 1907 | Sydney Cricket Ground, Sydney | 6–26 | New Zealand | 1907 New Zealand tour of Australia |
| 4 | 3 August 1907 | Brisbane Cricket Ground, Brisbane | 5–14 | New Zealand | 1907 New Zealand tour of Australia |
| 5 | 10 August 1907 | Sydney Cricket Ground, Sydney | 5–5 | draw | 1907 New Zealand tour of Australia |
| 6 | 25 June 1910 | Sydney Cricket Ground, Sydney | 0–6 | New Zealand | 1910 New Zealand tour of Australia |
| 7 | 27 June 1910 | Sydney Cricket Ground, Sydney | 11–0 | Australia | 1910 New Zealand tour of Australia |
| 8 | 2 July 1910 | Sydney Cricket Ground, Sydney | 13–28 | New Zealand | 1910 New Zealand tour of Australia |
| 9 | 6 September 1913 | Athletic Park, Wellington | 30–5 | New Zealand | 1913 Australia tour of New Zealand |
| 10 | 13 September 1913 | Carisbrook, Dunedin | 25–13 | New Zealand | 1913 Australia tour of New Zealand |
| 11 | 20 September 1913 | Lancaster Park, Christchurch | 5–16 | Australia | 1913 Australia tour of New Zealand |
| 12 | 18 July 1914 | Sydney Sports Ground, Sydney | 0–5 | New Zealand | 1914 New Zealand tour of Australia |
| 13 | 1 August 1914 | Brisbane Cricket Ground, Brisbane | 0–17 | New Zealand | 1914 New Zealand tour of Australia |
| 14 | 15 August 1914 | Sydney Sports Ground, Sydney | 7–22 | New Zealand | 1914 New Zealand tour of Australia |

=== XV results (1920–1928) ===
From 1920 to 1928, twenty-four matches took place. Australia was represented by New South Wales as the Queensland union suspended rugby post-war. Caps for these matches retrospectively awarded in the 1980s. New Zealand did not award test caps. Out of these twenty-four matches, Australia won six, and New Zealand won eighteen.

| Date | Venue | Score | Winner | Competition |
|---|---|---|---|---|
| 24 July 1920 | Sydney Sports Ground, Sydney | 15–26 | New Zealand XV | 1920 New Zealand XV tour of New South Wales |
| 31 July 1920 | Sydney Sports Ground, Sydney | 6–14 | New Zealand XV | 1920 New Zealand XV tour of New South Wales |
| 7 August 1920 | Sydney Sports Ground, Sydney | 13–24 | New Zealand XV | 1920 New Zealand XV tour of New South Wales |
| 3 September 1921 | Lancaster Park, Christchurch | 0–17 | Australia | 1921 New South Wales tour of New Zealand |
| 29 July 1922 | Royal Agricultural Showground, Sydney | 19–26 | New Zealand XV | 1922 New Zealand XV tour of New South Wales |
| 5 August 1922 | Royal Agricultural Showground, Sydney | 14–8 | Australia | 1922 New Zealand XV tour of New South Wales |
| 7 August 1922 | Royal Agricultural Showground, Sydney | 8–6 | Australia | 1922 New Zealand XV tour of New South Wales |
| 25 August 1923 | Carisbrook, Dunedin | 19–9 | New Zealand XV | 1923 New South Wales tour of New Zealand |
| 1 September 1923 | Lancaster Park, Christchurch | 34–6 | New Zealand XV | 1923 New South Wales tour of New Zealand |
| 15 September 1923 | Athletic Park, Wellington | 38–11 | New Zealand XV | 1923 New South Wales tour of New Zealand |
| 5 July 1924 | Royal Agricultural Showground, Sydney | 20–16 | Australia | 1924 New Zealand XV tour of New South Wales |
| 12 July 1924 | Royal Agricultural Showground, Sydney | 5–21 | New Zealand XV | 1924 New Zealand XV tour of New South Wales |
| 16 July 1924 | Royal Agricultural Showground, Sydney | 8–38 | New Zealand XV | 1924 New Zealand XV tour of New South Wales |
| 13 June 1925 | Royal Agricultural Showground, Sydney | 3–26 | New Zealand XV | 1925 New Zealand XV tour of New South Wales |
| 20 June 1925 | Royal Agricultural Showground, Sydney | 0–4 | New Zealand XV | 1925 New Zealand XV tour of New South Wales |
| 23 June 1925 | Royal Agricultural Showground, Sydney | 3–11 | New Zealand XV | 1925 New Zealand XV tour of New South Wales |
| 19 September 1925 | Eden Park, Auckland | 36–10 | New Zealand XV | 1925 New South Wales tour of New Zealand |
| 10 July 1926 | Royal Agricultural Showground, Sydney | 26–20 | Australia | 1926 New Zealand XV tour of New South Wales |
| 17 July 1926 | Royal Agricultural Showground, Sydney | 6–11 | New Zealand XV | 1926 New Zealand XV tour of New South Wales |
| 20 July 1926 | Royal Agricultural Showground, Sydney | 0–14 | New Zealand XV | 1926 New Zealand XV tour of New South Wales |
| 29 July 1926 | Royal Agricultural Showground, Sydney | 21–28 | New Zealand XV | 1926 New Zealand XV tour of New South Wales |
| 5 September 1928 | Athletic Park, Wellington | 15–12 | New Zealand XV | 1928 New South Wales tour of New Zealand |
| 8 September 1928 | Carisbrook, Dunedin | 16–14 | New Zealand XV | 1928 New South Wales tour of New Zealand |
| 15 September 1928 | Lancaster Park, Christchurch | 8–11 | Australia | 1928 New South Wales tour of New Zealand |

=== Pre World War II (1929–1938) ===
Australia's last Test before World War I was against New Zealand in July 1914. The sports authorities in Australia decided it was unpatriotic to play rugby while thousands of young Australian men were being sent overseas to fight. This resulted in competitions all but closed down in New South Wales and Queensland. In Queensland, regular competitions did not commence again until 1928. As a result, players switched to rugby league in large numbers. Even though there was no Australia/New Zealand game after the war before 1929, twenty-four games were held between New South Wales and New Zealand XV from 1920 to 1928. The results were eighteen victories against six for the All Blacks with sixteen games taking place in Sydney, New South Wales (most of them at the Royal Agricultural Society Ground) and the rest in New Zealand. Those games are counted as Australia/New Zealand on the IRB website. Also 1931 saw the first game played competing for the Bledisloe Cup. However the "official" first Bledisloe Cup match wasn't played until 1932.

| No. | Date | Venue | Score | Winner | Competition |
|---|---|---|---|---|---|
| 15 | 6 July 1929 | Sydney Cricket Ground, Sydney | 9–8 | Australia | 1929 New Zealand tour of Australia |
| 16 | 20 July 1929 | Brisbane Exhibition Ground, Brisbane | 17–9 | Australia | 1929 New Zealand tour of Australia |
| 17 | 27 July 1929 | Sydney Cricket Ground, Sydney | 15–13 | Australia | 1929 New Zealand tour of Australia |
| 18 | 12 September 1931 | Eden Park, Auckland | 20–13 | New Zealand | 1931 Australia tour of New Zealand |
| 19 | 2 July 1932 | Sydney Cricket Ground, Sydney | 22–17 | Australia | 1932 New Zealand tour of Australia |
| 20 | 16 July 1932 | Brisbane Exhibition Ground, Brisbane | 3–21 | New Zealand | 1932 New Zealand tour of Australia |
| 21 | 23 July 1932 | Sydney Cricket Ground, Sydney | 13–21 | New Zealand | 1932 New Zealand tour of Australia |
| 22 | 11 August 1934 | Sydney Cricket Ground, Sydney | 25–11 | Australia | 1934 New Zealand tour of Australia |
| 23 | 25 August 1934 | Sydney Cricket Ground, Sydney | 3–3 | draw | 1934 New Zealand tour of Australia |
| 24 | 5 September 1936 | Athletic Park, Wellington | 11–6 | New Zealand | 1936 Australia tour of New Zealand |
| 25 | 12 September 1936 | Carisbrook, Dunedin | 38–13 | New Zealand | 1936 Australia tour of New Zealand |
| 26 | 23 July 1938 | Sydney Cricket Ground, Sydney | 9–24 | New Zealand | 1938 New Zealand tour of Australia |
| 27 | 6 August 1938 | Brisbane Exhibition Ground, Brisbane | 14–20 | New Zealand | 1938 New Zealand tour of Australia |
| 28 | 13 August 1938 | Sydney Cricket Ground, Sydney | 6–14 | New Zealand | 1938 New Zealand tour of Australia |

=== Post War (1946–1974) ===
The first test following World War Two was played at Carisbrook, Dunedin between Australia and New Zealand in 1946, which New Zealand won 31–8. Australia did not win on the three-match tour; beaten 20–0 by New Zealand Māori, and then losing 14–10 to New Zealand the following week. The 1949 tour witnessed an infamous New Zealand record – the loss of two test matches on the same day. This was made possible because New Zealand's first team (and best thirty players) were touring South Africa at the same time. On the afternoon of 3 September New Zealand captained by J. B. Smith was beaten 11–6 by the Wallabies in Wellington. On 23 September New Zealand also lost their second Test, 16–9, which gave the Wallabies the Bledisloe Cup for the first time.

| No. | Date | Venue | Score | Winner | Competition |
|---|---|---|---|---|---|
| 29 | 14 September 1946 | Carisbrook, Dunedin | 31–8 | New Zealand | 1946 Australia tour of New Zealand |
| 30 | 28 September 1946 | Eden Park, Auckland | 14–10 | New Zealand | 1946 Australia tour of New Zealand |
| 31 | 14 June 1947 | Exhibition Ground, Brisbane | 5–13 | New Zealand | 1947 New Zealand tour of Australia |
| 32 | 28 June 1947 | Sydney Cricket Ground, Sydney | 14–27 | New Zealand | 1947 New Zealand tour of Australia |
| 33 | 3 September 1949 | Athletic Park, Wellington | 6–11 | Australia | 1949 Australia tour of New Zealand |
| 34 | 24 September 1949 | Eden Park, Auckland | 9–16 | Australia | 1949 Australia tour of New Zealand |
| 35 | 23 June 1951 | Sydney Cricket Ground, Sydney | 0–8 | New Zealand | 1951 New Zealand tour of Australia |
| 36 | 7 July 1951 | Sydney Cricket Ground, Sydney | 11–17 | New Zealand | 1951 New Zealand tour of Australia |
| 37 | 21 July 1951 | Brisbane Cricket Ground, Brisbane | 6–16 | New Zealand | 1951 New Zealand tour of Australia |
| 38 | 6 September 1952 | Lancaster Park, Christchurch | 9–14 | Australia | 1952 Australia tour of New Zealand |
| 39 | 13 September 1952 | Athletic Park, Wellington | 15–8 | New Zealand | 1952 Australia tour of New Zealand |
| 40 | 20 August 1955 | Athletic Park, Wellington | 16–8 | New Zealand | 1955 Australia tour of New Zealand |
| 41 | 3 September 1955 | Carisbrook, Dunedin | 8–0 | New Zealand | 1955 Australia tour of New Zealand |
| 42 | 17 September 1955 | Eden Park, Auckland | 3–8 | Australia | 1955 Australia tour of New Zealand |
| 43 | 25 May 1957 | Sydney Cricket Ground, Sydney | 11–25 | New Zealand | 1957 New Zealand tour of Australia |
| 44 | 1 June 1957 | Brisbane Exhibition Ground, Brisbane | 9–22 | New Zealand | 1957 New Zealand tour of Australia |
| 45 | 23 August 1958 | Athletic Park, Wellington | 25–3 | New Zealand | 1958 Australia tour of New Zealand |
| 46 | 6 September 1958 | Lancaster Park, Christchurch | 3–6 | Australia | 1958 Australia tour of New Zealand |
| 47 | 20 September 1958 | Epsom Showgrounds, Auckland | 17–8 | New Zealand | 1958 Australia tour of New Zealand |
| 48 | 26 May 1962 | Brisbane Exhibition Ground, Brisbane | 6–20 | New Zealand | 1962 New Zealand tour of Australia |
| 49 | 4 June 1962 | Sydney Cricket Ground, Sydney | 5–14 | New Zealand | 1962 New Zealand tour of Australia |
| 50 | 25 August 1962 | Athletic Park, Wellington | 9–9 | draw | 1962 Australia tour of New Zealand |
| 51 | 8 September 1962 | Carisbrook, Dunedin | 3–0 | New Zealand | 1962 Australia tour of New Zealand |
| 52 | 22 September 1962 | Eden Park, Auckland | 16–8 | New Zealand | 1962 Australia tour of New Zealand |
| 53 | 15 August 1964 | Carisbrook, Dunedin | 14–9 | New Zealand | 1964 Australia tour of New Zealand |
| 54 | 22 August 1964 | Lancaster Park, Christchurch | 18–3 | New Zealand | 1964 Australia tour of New Zealand |
| 55 | 29 August 1964 | Athletic Park, Wellington | 5–20 | Australia | 1964 Australia tour of New Zealand |
| 56 | 19 August 1967 | Athletic Park, Wellington | 29–9 | New Zealand | 1967 Australia tour of New Zealand |
| 57 | 15 June 1968 | Sydney Cricket Ground, Sydney | 11–27 | New Zealand | 1968 New Zealand tour of Australia |
| 58 | 22 June 1968 | Ballymore Stadium, Brisbane | 18–19 | New Zealand | 1968 New Zealand tour of Australia |
| 59 | 19 August 1972 | Athletic Park, Wellington | 29–6 | New Zealand | 1972 Australia tour of New Zealand |
| 60 | 2 September 1972 | Lancaster Park, Christchurch | 30–17 | New Zealand | 1972 Australia tour of New Zealand |
| 61 | 16 September 1972 | Eden Park, Auckland | 38–3 | New Zealand | 1972 Australia tour of New Zealand |
| 62 | 25 May 1974 | Sydney Cricket Ground, Sydney | 6–11 | New Zealand | 1974 New Zealand tour of Australia |
| 63 | 1 June 1974 | Ballymore Stadium, Brisbane | 16–16 | draw | 1974 New Zealand tour of Australia |
| 64 | 8 June 1974 | Sydney Cricket Ground, Sydney | 6–16 | New Zealand | 1974 New Zealand tour of Australia |

=== Full amateur tours (1978–1995) ===
The period before the game finally turned professional was fairly brief and saw the final touring years between the two sides. It was also the period in which the first Rugby World Cup in 1987, co-hosted between Australia and New Zealand, was played. Between 1978 and 1995, Australia and New Zealand toured each other five and six times, respectively. The two teams played each other thirty-six times, New Zealand winning twenty-one of them, Australia fourteen.

| No. | Date | Venue | Score | Winner | Competition |
|---|---|---|---|---|---|
| 65 | 19 August 1978 | Athletic Park, Wellington | 13–12 | New Zealand | 1978 Australia tour of New Zealand |
| 66 | 26 August 1978 | Lancaster Park, Christchurch | 22–6 | New Zealand | 1978 Australia tour of New Zealand |
| 67 | 9 September 1978 | Eden Park, Auckland | 16–30 | Australia | 1978 Australia tour of New Zealand |
| 68 | 28 July 1979 | Sydney Cricket Ground, Sydney | 12–6 | Australia | 1979 New Zealand tour of Australia |
| 69 | 21 June 1980 | Sydney Cricket Ground, Sydney | 13–9 | Australia | 1980 New Zealand tour of Australia and Fiji |
| 70 | 28 June 1980 | Ballymore Stadium, Brisbane | 9–12 | New Zealand | 1980 New Zealand tour of Australia and Fiji |
| 71 | 12 July 1980 | Sydney Cricket Ground, Sydney | 26–10 | Australia | 1980 New Zealand tour of Australia and Fiji |
| 72 | 14 August 1982 | Lancaster Park, Christchurch | 23–16 | New Zealand | 1982 Australia tour of New Zealand |
| 73 | 28 August 1982 | Athletic Park, Wellington | 16–19 | Australia | 1982 Australia tour of New Zealand |
| 74 | 11 September 1982 | Eden Park, Auckland | 33–18 | New Zealand | 1982 Australia tour of New Zealand |
| 75 | 20 August 1983 | Sydney Cricket Ground, Sydney | 8–18 | New Zealand | 1983 New Zealand tour of Australia |
| 76 | 21 July 1984 | Sydney Cricket Ground, Sydney | 16–9 | Australia | 1984 New Zealand tour of Australia |
| 77 | 4 August 1984 | Ballymore Stadium, Brisbane | 15–19 | New Zealand | 1984 New Zealand tour of Australia |
| 78 | 18 August 1984 | Sydney Cricket Ground, Sydney | 24–25 | New Zealand | 1984 New Zealand tour of Australia |
| 79 | 29 June 1985 | Eden Park, Auckland | 10–9 | New Zealand | 1985 Australia tour of New Zealand |
| 80 | 9 August 1986 | Athletic Park, Wellington | 12–13 | Australia | 1986 Australia tour of New Zealand |
| 81 | 23 August 1986 | Carisbrook, Dunedin | 13–12 | New Zealand | 1986 Australia tour of New Zealand |
| 82 | 6 September 1986 | Eden Park, Auckland | 9–22 | Australia | 1986 Australia tour of New Zealand |
| 83 | 25 July 1987 | Concord Oval, Sydney | 16–30 | New Zealand | 1987 New Zealand tour of Australia |
| 84 | 3 July 1988 | Concord Oval, Sydney | 7–32 | New Zealand | 1988 New Zealand tour of Australia |
| 85 | 16 July 1988 | Ballymore Stadium, Brisbane | 19–19 | draw | 1988 New Zealand tour of Australia |
| 86 | 30 July 1988 | Concord Oval, Sydney | 9–30 | New Zealand | 1988 New Zealand tour of Australia |
| 87 | 5 August 1989 | Eden Park, Auckland | 24–12 | New Zealand | 1989 Australia tour of New Zealand |
| 88 | 21 July 1990 | Lancaster Park, Christchurch | 21–6 | New Zealand | 1990 Australia tour of New Zealand |
| 89 | 4 August 1990 | Eden Park, Auckland | 27–17 | New Zealand | 1990 Australia tour of New Zealand |
| 90 | 18 August 1990 | Athletic Park, Wellington | 9–21 | Australia | 1990 Australia tour of New Zealand |
| 91 | 10 August 1991 | Sydney Football Stadium, Sydney | 21–12 | Australia | 1991 New Zealand tour of Australia |
| 92 | 24 August 1991 | Eden Park, Auckland | 6–3 | New Zealand | 1991 Australia tour of New Zealand |
| 93 | 27 October 1991 | Lansdowne Road, Dublin (Ireland) | 6–16 | Australia | 1991 Rugby World Cup Semi-final |
| 94 | 4 July 1992 | Sydney Football Stadium, Sydney | 16–15 | Australia | 1992 New Zealand tour of Australia and South Africa |
| 95 | 19 July 1992 | Ballymore Stadium, Brisbane | 19–17 | Australia | 1992 New Zealand tour of Australia and South Africa |
| 96 | 25 July 1992 | Sydney Football Stadium, Sydney | 23–26 | New Zealand | 1992 New Zealand tour of Australia and South Africa |
| 97 | 17 July 1993 | Carisbrook, Dunedin | 25–10 | New Zealand | 1993 Australia tour of New Zealand |
| 98 | 17 August 1994 | Sydney Football Stadium, Sydney | 20–16 | Australia | 1994 New Zealand tour of Australia |
| 99 | 22 July 1995 | Eden Park, Auckland | 28–16 | New Zealand | 1995 Bledisloe Cup |
| 100 | 29 July 1995 | Sydney Football Stadium, Sydney | 23–34 | New Zealand | 1995 Bledisloe Cup |

=== Professional era (since 1995) ===
Since the professional era, Australia and New Zealand have played each other consistently every year. Sometimes up to four times in a single year (2008, 2009, 2010, 2020), which is more times than any other two sides. Overall since the mid-1990s, the two teams have played each other 81 times, including the 2003 Rugby World Cup Semi-final, the 2011 Rugby World Cup Semi-final and the 2015 Rugby World Cup final. Currently in the "professional era", New Zealand holds sixty victories, Australia holds eighteen victories with three draws between the two sides.

| No. | Date | Venue | Score | Winner | Competition |
|---|---|---|---|---|---|
| 101 | 6 July 1996 | Athletic Park, Wellington | 43–6 | New Zealand | 1996 Tri Nations Series |
| 102 | 27 July 1996 | Lang Park, Brisbane | 25–32 | New Zealand | 1996 Tri Nations Series |
| 103 | 5 July 1997 | Lancaster Park, Christchurch | 30–13 | New Zealand | 1997 Bledisloe Cup I |
| 104 | 26 July 1997 | Melbourne Cricket Ground, Melbourne | 18–33 | New Zealand | 1997 Tri Nations Series |
| 105 | 16 August 1997 | Carisbrook, Dunedin | 36–24 | New Zealand | 1997 Tri Nations Series |
| 106 | 11 July 1998 | Melbourne Cricket Ground, Melbourne | 24–16 | Australia | 1998 Tri Nations Series |
| 107 | 1 August 1998 | Lancaster Park, Christchurch | 23–27 | Australia | 1998 Tri Nations Series |
| 108 | 29 August 1998 | Sydney Football Stadium, Sydney | 19–14 | Australia | 1998 Bledisloe Cup III |
| 109 | 24 July 1999 | Eden Park, Auckland | 34–15 | New Zealand | 1999 Tri Nations Series |
| 110 | 28 August 1999 | Stadium Australia, Sydney | 28–7 | Australia | 1999 Tri Nations Series |
| 111 | 15 July 2000 | Stadium Australia, Sydney | 35–39 | New Zealand | 2000 Tri Nations Series |
| 112 | 5 August 2000 | Wellington Regional Stadium, Wellington | 23–24 | Australia | 2000 Tri Nations Series |
| 113 | 11 August 2001 | Carisbrook, Dunedin | 15–23 | Australia | 2001 Tri Nations Series |
| 114 | 1 September 2001 | Stadium Australia, Sydney | 29–26 | Australia | 2001 Tri Nations Series |
| 115 | 13 July 2002 | Lancaster Park, Christchurch | 12–6 | New Zealand | 2002 Tri Nations Series |
| 116 | 3 August 2002 | Stadium Australia, Sydney | 16–14 | Australia | 2002 Tri Nations Series |
| 117 | 26 July 2003 | Stadium Australia, Sydney | 21–50 | New Zealand | 2003 Tri Nations Series |
| 118 | 16 August 2003 | Eden Park, Auckland | 21–17 | New Zealand | 2003 Tri Nations Series |
| 119 | 15 November 2003 | Stadium Australia, Sydney | 22–10 | Australia | 2003 Rugby World Cup Semi-final |
| 120 | 17 July 2004 | Wellington Regional Stadium, Wellington | 16–7 | New Zealand | 2004 Tri Nations Series |
| 121 | 7 August 2004 | Stadium Australia, Sydney | 23–18 | Australia | 2004 Tri Nations Series |
| 122 | 13 August 2005 | Stadium Australia, Sydney | 13–30 | New Zealand | 2005 Tri Nations Series |
| 123 | 3 September 2005 | Eden Park, Auckland | 34–24 | New Zealand | 2005 Tri Nations Series |
| 124 | 8 July 2006 | Lancaster Park, Christchurch | 32–12 | New Zealand | 2006 Tri Nations Series |
| 125 | 29 July 2006 | Lang Park, Brisbane | 9–13 | New Zealand | 2006 Tri Nations Series |
| 126 | 19 August 2006 | Eden Park, Auckland | 34–27 | New Zealand | 2006 Tri Nations Series |
| 127 | 30 June 2007 | Melbourne Cricket Ground, Melbourne | 20–15 | Australia | 2007 Tri Nations Series |
| 128 | 21 July 2007 | Eden Park, Auckland | 26–12 | New Zealand | 2007 Tri Nations Series |
| 129 | 26 July 2008 | Stadium Australia, Sydney | 34–19 | Australia | 2008 Tri Nations Series |
| 130 | 2 August 2008 | Eden Park, Auckland | 39–10 | New Zealand | 2008 Tri Nations Series |
| 131 | 13 September 2008 | Lang Park, Brisbane | 24–28 | New Zealand | 2008 Tri Nations Series |
| 132 | 1 November 2008 | Hong Kong Stadium, Victoria Park (Hong Kong) | 19–14 | New Zealand | 2008 Autumn International |
| 133 | 18 July 2009 | Eden Park, Auckland | 22–16 | New Zealand | 2009 Tri Nations Series |
| 134 | 22 August 2009 | Stadium Australia, Sydney | 18–19 | New Zealand | 2009 Tri Nations Series |
| 135 | 19 September 2009 | Wellington Regional Stadium, Wellington | 33–6 | New Zealand | 2009 Tri Nations Series |
| 136 | 31 October 2009 | National Stadium, Tokyo (Japan) | 32–19 | New Zealand | 2009 Autumn International |
| 137 | 31 July 2010 | Docklands Stadium, Melbourne | 28–49 | New Zealand | 2010 Tri Nations Series |
| 138 | 7 August 2010 | Lancaster Park, Christchurch | 20–10 | New Zealand | 2010 Tri Nations Series |
| 139 | 11 September 2010 | Stadium Australia, Sydney | 22–23 | New Zealand | 2010 Tri Nations Series |
| 140 | 30 October 2010 | Hong Kong Stadium, Victoria Park (Hong Kong) | 26–24 | Australia | 2010 Autumn International |
| 141 | 6 August 2011 | Eden Park, Auckland | 30–14 | New Zealand | 2011 Tri Nations Series |
| 142 | 27 August 2011 | Lang Park, Brisbane | 25–20 | Australia | 2011 Tri Nations Series |
| 143 | 16 October 2011 | Eden Park, Auckland | 20–6 | New Zealand | 2011 Rugby World Cup Semi-final |
| 144 | 18 August 2012 | Stadium Australia, Sydney | 19–27 | New Zealand | 2012 Rugby Championship |
| 145 | 25 August 2012 | Eden Park, Auckland | 22–0 | New Zealand | 2012 Rugby Championship |
| 146 | 20 October 2012 | Lang Park, Brisbane | 18–18 | draw | 2012 Autumn International |
| 147 | 17 August 2013 | Stadium Australia, Sydney | 29–47 | New Zealand | 2013 Rugby Championship |
| 148 | 24 August 2013 | Wellington Regional Stadium, Wellington | 27–16 | New Zealand | 2013 Rugby Championship |
| 149 | 19 October 2013 | Forsyth Barr Stadium, Dunedin | 41–33 | New Zealand | 2013 Autumn International |
| 150 | 16 August 2014 | Stadium Australia, Sydney | 12–12 | draw | 2014 Rugby Championship |
| 151 | 23 August 2014 | Eden Park, Auckland | 51–20 | New Zealand | 2014 Rugby Championship |
| 152 | 18 October 2014 | Lang Park, Brisbane | 28–29 | New Zealand | 2014 Autumn International |
| 153 | 8 August 2015 | Stadium Australia, Sydney | 27–19 | Australia | 2015 Rugby Championship |
| 154 | 15 August 2015 | Eden Park, Auckland | 41–13 | New Zealand | 2015 Rugby World Cup warm-up match |
| 155 | 31 October 2015 | Twickenham Stadium, London (England) | 34–17 | New Zealand | 2015 Rugby World Cup final |
| 156 | 20 August 2016 | Stadium Australia, Sydney | 8–42 | New Zealand | 2016 Rugby Championship |
| 157 | 27 August 2016 | Wellington Regional Stadium, Wellington | 29–9 | New Zealand | 2016 Rugby Championship |
| 158 | 22 October 2016 | Eden Park, Auckland | 37–10 | New Zealand | 2016 Autumn International |
| 159 | 19 August 2017 | Stadium Australia, Sydney | 34–54 | New Zealand | 2017 Rugby Championship |
| 160 | 26 August 2017 | Forsyth Barr Stadium, Dunedin | 35–29 | New Zealand | 2017 Rugby Championship |
| 161 | 21 October 2017 | Lang Park, Brisbane | 23–18 | Australia | 2017 Autumn International |
| 162 | 18 August 2018 | Stadium Australia, Sydney | 13–38 | New Zealand | 2018 Rugby Championship |
| 163 | 25 August 2018 | Eden Park, Auckland | 40–12 | New Zealand | 2018 Rugby Championship |
| 164 | 27 October 2018 | Nissan Stadium, Yokohama (Japan) | 37–20 | New Zealand | 2018 Autumn International |
| 165 | 10 August 2019 | Perth Stadium, Perth | 47–26 | Australia | 2019 Rugby Championship |
| 166 | 17 August 2019 | Eden Park, Auckland | 36–0 | New Zealand | 2019 Rugby World Cup warm-up match |
| 167 | 11 October 2020 | Wellington Regional Stadium, Wellington | 16–16 | draw | 2020 Autumn International |
| 168 | 18 October 2020 | Eden Park, Auckland | 27–7 | New Zealand | 2020 Autumn International |
| 169 | 31 October 2020 | Stadium Australia, Sydney | 5–43 | New Zealand | 2020 Tri Nations Series |
| 170 | 7 November 2020 | Lang Park, Brisbane | 24–22 | Australia | 2020 Tri Nations Series |
| 171 | 7 August 2021 | Eden Park, Auckland | 33–25 | New Zealand | 2021 Summer International |
| 172 | 14 August 2021 | Eden Park, Auckland | 57–22 | New Zealand | 2021 Rugby Championship |
| 173 | 5 September 2021 | Perth Stadium, Perth | 21–38 | New Zealand | 2021 Rugby Championship |
| 174 | 15 September 2022 | Docklands Stadium, Melbourne | 37–39 | New Zealand | 2022 Rugby Championship |
| 175 | 24 September 2022 | Eden Park, Auckland | 40–14 | New Zealand | 2022 Rugby Championship |
| 176 | 29 July 2023 | Melbourne Cricket Ground, Melbourne | 7–38 | New Zealand | 2023 Rugby Championship |
| 177 | 5 August 2023 | Forsyth Barr Stadium, Dunedin | 23–20 | New Zealand | 2023 Rugby World Cup warm-up match |
| 178 | 21 September 2024 | Stadium Australia, Sydney | 31–28 | New Zealand | 2024 Rugby Championship |
| 179 | 28 September 2024 | Wellington Regional Stadium, Wellington | 33–13 | New Zealand | 2024 Rugby Championship |
| 180 | 27 September 2025 | Eden Park, Auckland | 33–24 | New Zealand | 2025 Rugby Championship |
| 181 | 4 October 2025 | Perth Stadium, Perth | 14–28 | New Zealand | 2025 Rugby Championship |
| 182 | 10 October 2026 | Eden Park, Auckland | 50–19 | New Zealand | 2026 Bledisloe Cup |
| 183 | 17 October 2026 | Stadium Australia, Sydney | 21–43 | New Zealand | 2026 Bledisloe Cup |

== List of series ==
| Played | Won by New Zealand | Won by Australia | Drawn |
|---|---|---|---|
| 46 | 36 | 9 | 1 |

| Year | Australia | New Zealand | Series winner | Bledisloe Cup |
|---|---|---|---|---|
| 1903 | 0 | 1 | New Zealand | N/A |
| 1905 | 0 | 1 | New Zealand | N/A |
| 1907 | 0 | 2 | New Zealand (Note: The final match, in a three-match test series, was drawn 5–5.) | N/A |
| 1910 | 1 | 2 | New Zealand | N/A |
| 1913 | 1 | 2 | New Zealand | N/A |
| 1914 | 0 | 3 | New Zealand | N/A |
| 1929 | 3 | 0 | Australia | N/A |
| 1931 | 0 | 1 | New Zealand (Note: The 1931 Australian tour of New Zealand was a one-test series.) | N/A |
| 1932 | 2 | 1 | New Zealand | |
| 1934 | 1 | 0 | Australia (Note: Australia, in the two-test 1934 series, won the first test and drew the second. They were declared 1–0 series winners after two tests were played.) | |
| 1936 | 0 | 2 | New Zealand | |
| 1938 | 0 | 3 | New Zealand | |
| 1946 | 0 | 2 | New Zealand | |
| 1947 | 0 | 2 | New Zealand | |
| 1949 | 2 | 0 | Australia | |
| 1951 | 0 | 3 | New Zealand | |
| 1952 | 1 | 1 | draw | |
| 1955 | 1 | 2 | New Zealand | |
| 1957 | 0 | 2 | New Zealand | |
| 1958 | 1 | 2 | New Zealand | |
| 1962 | 0 | 2 | New Zealand | |
| 1962 | 0 | 2 | New Zealand (Note: The first test in the series was drawn 9–9.) | |
| 1964 | 1 | 2 | New Zealand | |
| 1967 | 0 | 1 | New Zealand (Note: The 1967 series was a one-test series.) | |
| 1968 | 0 | 2 | New Zealand | |
| 1972 | 0 | 3 | New Zealand | |
| 1974 | 0 | 2 | New Zealand (Note: The second test was drawn 16–16.) | |
| 1978 | 1 | 2 | New Zealand | |
| 1979 | 1 | 0 | Australia | |
| 1980 | 2 | 1 | Australia | |
| 1982 | 1 | 2 | New Zealand | |
| 1983 | 0 | 1 | New Zealand | |
| 1984 | 1 | 2 | New Zealand | |
| 1985 | 0 | 1 | New Zealand | |
| 1986 | 2 | 1 | Australia | |
| 1987 | 0 | 1 | New Zealand | |
| 1988 | 0 | 2 | New Zealand (Note: The second test between the two sides in the series was drawn.) | |
| 1989 | 0 | 1 | New Zealand | |
| 1990 | 1 | 2 | New Zealand | |
| 1991 | 1 | 0 | Australia | New Zealand |
| 1991 | 0 | 1 | New Zealand | New Zealand |
| 1992 | 2 | 1 | Australia | |
| 1993 | 0 | 1 | New Zealand | |
| 1994 | 1 | 0 | Australia | |
| 1995 | 0 | 1 | New Zealand | New Zealand |
| 1995 | 0 | 1 | New Zealand | New Zealand |

== See also ==
- Australia–New Zealand sports rivalries
- List of international rugby rivalries
