= List of All Blacks tours and series =

This is a list of All Blacks tours and series. The list includes all tours and series involving a rugby union team that represented the whole of New Zealand and was officially sanctioned by the body now known as New Zealand Rugby (NZR). Unofficial teams, such as the 1986 New Zealand Cavaliers, and teams from before the formation of NZR (in 1892) are not included.

== Tours and series ==
Year(s)	Tournament or series	Played in	Games (tests) played	Games (tests) won	Games (tests) lost	Games (tests) drawn	Points for (tests)	Points against (tests)
1884	New Zealand in New South Wales	New South Wales	8	8	0	0		
1893	New Zealand in Australia	New South Wales; Queensland	10	9	0	1		
1894	New South Wales in New Zealand	New Zealand	1	0	1	0	6	8
1896	Queensland in New Zealand	New Zealand	1	1	0	0	9	0
1897	New Zealand in Australia	New South Wales; Queensland	11	9	2	0	238	83
1901	New South Wales in New Zealand	New Zealand	2	2	0	0	44	8
1903	New Zealand in Australia	Australia	11 (1)	10 (1)	1	0	281 (22)	27 (3)
1904	British Lion in New Zealand	New Zealand	1 (1)	1 (1)	0	0	9 (9)	3 (3)
1905	New Zealand in Australia and New Zealand	(Australia) Australia; New Zealand	7	4	1	2	89	30
1905	Australia in New Zealand	New Zealand	1 (1)	1 (1)	0	0	14 (14)	3 (3)
1905 & 1906	1905 Originals Tour	United Kingdom; France; North America	35 (5)	34 (4)	1 (1)	0	976 (42)	59 (10)
1907	New Zealand in Australia	Australia	8 (3)	6 (2)	1 (0)	1 (1)	115 (45)	53 (16)
1908	Anglo-Welsh in New Zealand	New Zealand	3 (3)	2 (2)	0 (0)	1 (1)	64 (64)	8 (8)
1910	New Zealand in Australia	Australia	8 (3)	7 (2)	1 (1)	0 (0)	138 (34)	78 (24)
1913	Australia in New Zealand	New Zealand	4 (3)	3 (2)	1 (1)	0	79 (60)	52 (34)
1913	New Zealand in North America	Canada; United States	16 (1)	16 (1)	0	0	610 (51)	6 (3)
1914	New Zealand in Australia	Australia	11 (3)	10 (3)	1	0	260 (44)	69 (7)
1920	New Zealand in New South Wales	New South Wales	10 (0)	0	1	0	352	91
1921	South Africa & New South Wales in NZ	New Zealand	4 (3)	1 (1)	2 (1)	1 (0)	18 (18)	31 (14)
1922	New Zealand in New South Wales	New South Wales	8 (0)	6	2		198	102
1923	New South Wales in New Zealand	New Zealand	3 (0)	3	0	0	91	26
1924	New Zealand in New South Wales	(New South Wales) New South Wales; New Zealand	4 (0)	2	2	0	198	102
1924/1925	The Invincibles Tour	Australia; United Kingdom; France; Canada	38 (4)	36 (4)	2 (0)	0 (0)	981 (72)	180 (17)
1925	New Zealand in New South Wales	Australia	8	6	2	0	132	67
1925	New South Wales in New Zealand	New Zealand	1	1	0	0	36	10
1926	New Zealand in New South Wales	Australia	8	6	2	0	187	109
1928	New Zealand in South Africa	South Africa	23 (4)	17 (2)	5 (2)	1	397 (26)	153 (39)
1928	New South Wales in New Zealand	New Zealand	4	3	1	0	79	40
1929	New Zealand in Australia	Australia	10 (3)	6 (0)	3 (3)	1	186 (30)	80 (41))
1930	Great Britain in New Zealand	New Zealand	5 (5)	4 (4)	1 (1)	0	87 (87)	40 (40)
1931	Australia in New Zealand	New Zealand	1 (1)	1 (0)	0 (0)	0 (0)	20 (20)	13 (13)
1932	New Zealand in Australia	Australia	11 (2)	9 (1)	2 (1)	0 (0)	331 (38)	135 (25)
1934	New Zealand in Australia	Australia	9 (2)	7 (0)	1 (1)	1 (1)	201 (14)	107 (28)
1935/1936	NZ in British Isles and Canada	United Kingdom; Ireland; Canada	30 (4)	26 (2)	3 (2)	1 (0)	490 (47)	183 (43)
1936	Australia in New Zealand	New Zealand	3 (3)	3 (3)	0 (0)	0 (0)	65 (65)	32 (32)
1937	South Africa in New Zealand	New Zealand	3 (3)	1 (1)	2 (2)	0 (0)	25 (25)	37 (37)
1938	New Zealand in Australia	Australia	9 (3)	9 (3)	0 (0)	0 (0)	279 (58)	73 (29)
1946	Australia in New Zealand	New Zealand	2 (2)	2 (2)	0 (0)	0 (0)	45 (45)	18 (18)
1947	New Zealand in Australia	Australia	10 (2)	8 (2)	2 (0)	0 (0)	263 (40)	113 (19)
1949	New Zealand in South Africa	South Africa	25 (4)	14 (0)	7 (4)	4 (0)	241 (28)	157 (37)
1949	Australia in New Zealand	New Zealand	2 (2)	0 (0)	2 (2)	0 (0)	15 (15)	27 (27)
1950	British Isles in New Zealand	New Zealand	4 (4)	3 (3)	1 (1)	0 (0)	34 (34)	20 (20)
1951	New Zealand in Australia	Australia	13 (3)	13 (3)	0 (0)	0 (0)	375 (41)	86 (17)
1953/1954	Europe and North America	United Kingdom; Ireland; France; Canada; United States	36 (5)	30 (3)	4 (2)	2 (0)	598 (30)	152 (19)
1955	Australia in New Zealand	New Zealand	3 (3)	2 (2)	1 (1)	0 (0)	27 (27)	16 (16)
1956	South Africa in New Zealand	New Zealand	4 (4)	3 (3)	1 (1)	0 (0)	41 (41)	29 (29)
1957	New Zealand in Australia	Australia	14 (2)	13 (2)	1 (0)	0 (0)	472 (47)	94 (20)
1958	Australia in New Zealand	New Zealand	3 (3)	2 (2)	1 (1)	0 (0)	45 (45)	17 (17)
1959	British Isles in New Zealand	New Zealand	4 (4)	3 (3)	1 (1)	0 (0)	57 (57)	42 (42)
1960	New Zealand in South Africa	South Africa; Australia	32 (4)	26 (1)	4 (2)	2 (1)	645 (25)	187 (35)
1961	France in New Zealand	New Zealand	3 (3)	3 (3)	0 (0)	0 (0)	50 (50)	12 (12)
1962	New Zealand in Australia	Australia	10 (2)	9 (2)	1 (0)	0 (0)	426 (34)	49 (11)
1962	Australia in New Zealand	New Zealand	3 (3)	2 (2)	0 (0)	1 (1)	28 (28)	17 (17)
1963	England in New Zealand	New Zealand	2 (2)	2 (2)	0 (0)	0 (0)	30 (30)	17 (17)
1963/1964	New Zealand in British Isles, France and Canada	United Kingdom; Ireland; France; Canada	36 (5)	34 (4)	1 (0)	1 (1)	613 (38)	159 (8)
1964	Australia in New Zealand	New Zealand	3 (3)	2 (2)	1 (1)	0 (0)	37 (37)	32 (32)
1965	South Africa in Australia and New Zealand	Australia; New Zealand	4 (4)	3 (3)	1 (1)	0 (0)	55 (55)	25 (25)
1966	British Isles in New Zealand	New Zealand	4 (4)	4 (4)	0 (0)	0 (0)	79 (79)	32 (32)
1967	Australia in New Zealand	New Zealand	1 (1)	1 (1)	0 (0)	0 (0)	29 (29)	9 (9)
1967	New Zealand in Europe and Canada	United Kingdom; France; Canada	17 (4)	16 (4)	0 (0)	1 (0)	370 (71)	135 (35)
1968	New Zealand in Australia and Fiji	Australia; Fiji	12 (2)	12 (2)	0 (0)	0 (0)	460 (46)	66 (29)
1968	France in New Zealand	New Zealand	3 (3)	3 (3)	0 (0)	0 (0)	40 (40)	24 (24)
1969	Wales in New Zealand	New Zealand	2 (2)	2 (2)	0 (0)	0 (0)	52 (52)	12 (12)
1970	New Zealand in Australia and South Africa	South Africa; Australia	26 (4)	23 (1)	3 (3)	0 (0)	789 (35)	234 (59)
1971	British Isles in New Zealand	New Zealand	4 (4)	1 (1)	2 (2)	1 (1)	42 (42)	48 (48)
1972	Internal tour	New Zealand	9 (0)	9 (0)	0 (0)	0 (0)	355 (0)	88 (0)
1972	Australia in New Zealand	New Zealand	3 (3)	3 (3)	0 (0)	0 (0)	97 (97)	26 (26)
1972/1973	New Zealand in Europe and North America	United Kingdom; France; Canada; United States	50 (32)	25 (3)	5 (1)	2 (1)	640 (58)	266 (48)
1973	Internal tour and England in NZ	New Zealand	5 (1)	2 (0)	3 (1)	0 (0)	88 (10)	83 (16)
1974	New Zealand in Australia and Fiji	Australia; Fiji	13 (3)	12 (2)	0 (0)	1 (1)	446 (43)	73 (28)
1974	New Zealand in Ireland, Wales and England	United Kingdom; Ireland	9 (1)	7 (1)	0 (0)	1 (0)	127 (15)	50 (6)
1975	Scotland in New Zealand	New Zealand	1 (1)	1 (1)	0 (0)	0 (0)	24 (24)	0 (0)
1976	Ireland in New Zealand	New Zealand	1 (1)	1 (1)	0 (0)	0 (0)	11 (11)	3 (3)
1976	New Zealand n South Africa	South Africa	24 (4)	18 (1)	6 (3)	0 (0)	610 (46)	291 (55)
1976	New Zealand in South America	Argentina; Uruguay	9 (0)	9 (0)	0 (0)	0 (0)	321 (0)	72 (0)
1977	British Lions in New Zealand	New Zealand	4 (4)	3 (3)	1 (1)	0 (0)	54 (54)	41 (41)
1977	New Zealand in Italy and France	Italy; France	9 (2)	8 (1)	1 (1)	0 (0)	216 (28)	86 (21)
1978	Australia in New Zealand	New Zealand	3 (3)	2 (2)	1 (1)	0 (0)	51 (51)	48 (48)
1978	New Zealand in British Isles	United Kingdom; Ireland	18 (4)	17 (4)	1 (0)	0 (0)	364 (57)	147 (33)
1979	France in New Zealand	New Zealand	2 (2)	1 (1)	1 (1)	0 (0)	42 (42)	33 (33)
1979	New Zealand in Australia	Australia	2 (1)	1 (0)	1 (1)	0 (0)	41 (6)	15 (12)
1979	Argentina in New Zealand	New Zealand	2 (0)	2 (0)	0 (0)	0 (0)	33 (0)	15 (0)
1979	New Zealand in Europe	England; Scotland; Italy	11 (2)	10 (2)	1 (0)	0 (0)	192 (30)	95 (15)
1980	New Zealand in Australia and Fiji	Australia; Fiji	16 (4)	12 (1)	3 (2)	1 (0)	507 (31)	126 (48)
1980	Fiji	New Zealand	1 (0)	1 (0)	0 (0)	0 (0)	33 (0)	0 (0)
1980	New Zealand in Wales and North America	Wales; Canada; United States	7 (1)	7 (1)	0 (0)	0 (0)	197 (23)	41 (3)
1981	Scotland	New Zealand	2 (2)	2 (2)	0 (0)	0 (0)	51(51)	19 (19)
1981	South Africa in New Zealand	New Zealand	3 (3)	2 (2)	1 (1)	0 (0)	55	51
1981	New Zealand in Romania and France	Romania; France	10 (3)	8 (3)	1 (0)	1 (0)	170 (45)	108 (21)
1982	Australia in New Zealand	New Zealand	3 (3)	2 (2)	1 (1)	0 (0)	72 (72)	53 (53)
1983	British Isles in New Zealand	New Zealand	4 (4)	4 (4)	0 (0)	0 (0)	78 (78)	26 (26)
1983	Bledisloe Cup 1983	Australia	1 (1)	1 (1)	0 (0)	0 (0)	18 (18)	8 (8)
1983	New Zealand in Scotland and England	Scotland; England	8 (2)	5 (0)	2 (1)	1 (1)	162 (34)	116 (40)
1984	France in New Zealand	New Zealand	2 (2)	2 (2)	0 (0)	0 (0)	41 (41)	27 (27)
1984	New Zealand in Australia	Australia	14 (3)	13 (2)	1 (1)	0 (0)	600 (53)	117 (55)
1984	New Zealand in Fiji	Fiji	4 (0)	4 (0)	0 (0)	0 (0)	174 (0)	10 (0)
1985	England in New Zealand	New Zealand	2 (2)	2 (2)	0 (0)	0 (0)	60 (60)	28 (28)
1985	Australia in New Zealand	New Zealand	1 (1)	1 (1)	0 (0)	0 (0)	10 (10)	9 (9)
1985	New Zealand in Argentina	Argentina	7 (2)	6 (1)	0 (0)	1 (1)	263 (54)	87 (41)
1986	France in New Zealand	New Zealand	1 (1)	1 (1)	0 (0)	0 (0)	18 (18)	9 (9)
1986	Australia in New Zealand	New Zealand	3 (3)	1 (1)	2 (2)	0 (0)	34(34)	47 (47)
1986	New Zealand in France	France	8 (2)	7 (1)	1 (1)	0 (0)	218 (22)	87 (23)
1987	Rugby World Cup	New Zealand; Australia	6 (6)	6 (6)	0 (0)	0 (0)	298 (298)	52 (52)
1987	New Zealand in Australia	Australia	1 (1)	1 (1)	0 (0)	0 (0)	30 (30)	16 (16)
1987	New Zealand in Japan	Japan	5 (0)	5 (0)	0 (0)	0 (0)	408 (0)	16 (0)
1988	Wales in New Zealand	New Zealand	2 (2)	2 (2)	0 (0)	0 (0)	106 (106)	12 (12)
1988	New Zealand in Australia	Australia	13 (3)	12 (2)	0 (0)	1 (1)	476 (71)	96 (36)
1989	France in New Zealand	New Zealand	2 (2)	2 (2)	0 (0)	0 (0)	59 (59)	37 (37)
1989	Argentina in New Zealand	New Zealand	2 (2)	2 (2)	0 (0)	0 (0)	109 (109)	21 (21)
1989	Australia in New Zealand	New Zealand	1 (1)	1 (1)	0 (0)	0 (0)	24 (24)	12 (12)
1989	New Zealand in British Isles and Canada	United Kingdom; Ireland; Canada	14 (2)	14 (2)	0 (0)	0 (0)	454 (57)	122 (15)
1990	Scotland	New Zealand	2 (2)	2 (2)	0 (0)	0 (0)	52 (52)	34 (34)
1990	Australia	New Zealand	3 (3)	2 (2)	1 (1)	0 (0)	57 (57)	44 (44)
1990	New Zealand in France	France	8 (2)	6 (2)	2 (0)	0 (0)	175 (54)	110 (15)
1991	Romania in New Zealand	Romania	8 (0)	3 (0)	5 (0)	0 (0)	234 (0)	176 (0)
1991	USSR in New Zealand	(Soviet Union) USSR	8 (0)	4 (0)	4 (0)	0 (0)	149 (0)	270 (0)
1991	New Zealand in Argentina	Argentina	9 (2)	9 (2)	0 (0)	0 (0)	358 (64)	80 (20)
1991	New Zealand in Australia	Australia	1 (1)	0 (0)	1 (1)	0 (0)	12 (12)	21 (21)
1991	Australia	New Zealand	1 (1)	1 (1)	0 (0)	0 (0)	6 (6)	3 (3)
1991	Rugby World Cup	England; Wales (Republic of Ireland) Ireland; France	6 (6)	5 (5)	1 (1)	0 (0)	143 (143)	74 (74)
1992	Centenary Matches	New Zealand	3 (3)	2 (2)	1 (1)	0 (0)	94 (94)	69 (69)
1992	Ireland in New Zealand	New Zealand	2 (2)	2 (2)	0 (0)	0 (0)	83 (83)	27 (27)
1992	England B in New Zealand	New Zealand	8 (0)	2 (0)	6 (0)	0 (0)	(98) (0)	(173) (0)
1992	New Zealand in Australia and South Africa	South Africa; Australia	16 (4)	13 (2)	3 (2)	0 (0)	567 (85)	252 (82)
1993	British Isles in New Zealand	New Zealand	3 (3)	2 (2)	1 (1)	0 (0)	57 (57)	51 (51)
1993	Australia	New Zealand	1 (1)	1 (1)	0 (0)	0 (0)	25 (25)	10 (10)
1993	Western Samoa	New Zealand	1 (1)	1 (1)	0 (0)	0 (0)	35 (35)	13 (13)
1993	New Zealand in Britain	England; Scotland	13 (2)	12 (10	1 (1)	0 (0)	386 (60)	156 (30)
1994	France in New Zealand	New Zealand	20 (2)	0 (0)	2 (2)	0 (0)	28 (28)	45 (45)
1994	South Africa in New Zealand	New Zealand	30 (3)	2 (2)	0 (0)	1 (1)	53 (53)	41 (41)
1994	New Zealand in Australia	Australia	1 (1)	0 (0)	1 (1)	0 (0)	16 (16)	20 (20)
1995	Canada	New Zealand	1 (1)	1 (1)	0 (0)	0 (0)	73 (73)	7 (7)
1995	Rugby World Cup	South Africa	7 (7)	6 (6)	1 (10	0 (0)	327 (327)	119 (119)
1995	Australia	New Zealand	1	1	0 (0)	0 (0)	28 (28)	16 (16)
1995	New Zealand in Australia	Australia	1 (1)	1 (1)	0 (0)	0 (0)	34 (34)	23 (23)
1995	New Zealand in Italy and France	Italy; France	8 (3)	7 (2)	1 (1)	0 (0)	339 (122)	126 (40)
1996	Mid-year series	New Zealand	3 (3)	3 (3)	0 (0)	0 (0)	149 (149)	53 (53)
1996	Tri-Nations	Australia; New Zealand; South Africa	4 (4)	4 (4)	0 (0)	0 (0)	119 (199)	60 (60)
1996	New Zealand in South Africa	South Africa	7 (3)	5 (2)	1 (1)	1 (0)	190 (78)	139 (77)
1997	Argentina in NZ and Mid-year series	New Zealand	4 (4)	4 (4)	0 (0)	0 (0)	256 (256)	36 (36)
1997	Tri-Nations	Australia; New Zealand; South Africa	4 (4)	4 (4)	0 (0)	0 (0)	159 (159)	109 (109)
1997	New Zealand in British Isles	United Kingdom; Ireland	9 (4)	8 (3)	0 (0)	1 (1)	395 (156)	119 (56)
1998	Mid-year series	New Zealand	2 (2)	2 (2)	0 (0)	0 (0)	104 (104)	32 (32)
1998	Tri-Nations	Australia; New Zealand; South Africa	4 (4)	0 (0)	4 (4)	0 (0)	65 (65)	88 (88)
1998	New Zealand in Australia	Australia	1 (1)	0 (0)	1 (1)	0 (0)	14 (14)	19 (19)
1999	Mid-year series	New Zealand	3 (2)	3 (2)	0 (0)	0 (0)	147 (125)	31 (20)
1999	Tri-Nations	Australia; New Zealand; South Africa	4 (4)	4 (3)	1 (1)	0 (0)	147 (147)	31 (31)
1999	World Cup	England; Wales	6 (6)	4 (4)	2 (2)	0 (0)	255 (255)	111 (111)
2000	Mid-year series	New Zealand	3 (3)	3 (3)	0 (0)	0 (0)	219 (219)	34 (34)
2000	Tri-Nations	Australia; New Zealand; South Africa	4 (4)	2 (2)	2 (2)	0 (0)	127 (127)	117 (117)
2000	New Zealand in Italy and France	Italy; France	3 (3)	3 (2)	1 (1)	0 (0)	128 (128)	87 (87)
2001	Mid-year series	New Zealand	3 (3)	3 (3)	0 (0)	0 (0)	154 (154)	37 (37)
2001	Tri-Nations	Australia; New Zealand; South Africa	4 (4)	2 (2)	2 (2)	0 (0)	79 (79)	70 (70)
2001	New Zealand in Ireland, Scotland and Argentina	Ireland; Scotland; Argentina	5 (5)	5 (5)	0 (0)	0 (0)	179 (179)	98 (98)
2002	Mid-year series	New Zealand	4 (4)	4 (4)	0 (0)	0 (0)	187 (187)	42 (42)
2002	Tri-Nations	Australia; New Zealand; South Africa	4 (4)	3 (3)	1 (1)	0 (0)	97 (97)	65 (65)
2002	New Zealand in England, France and Wales	England; Wales; France	3 (3)	1 (1)	1 (1)	1 (1)	91 (91)	68 (68)
2003	Mid-year series	New Zealand	3 (3)	2 (2)	1 (1)	0 (0)	99 (99)	41 (41)
2003	Tri-Nations	Australia; New Zealand; South Africa	4 (4)	4 (4)	0 (0)	0 (0)	142 (142)	65 (65)
2003	Rugby World Cup	Australia	7 (7)	6 (6)	1 (1)	0 (0)	361 (361)	101 (101)
2004	Mid-year series	New Zealand	4 (4)	4 (4)	0 (0)	0 (0)	154 (154)	48 (48)
2004	Tri-Nations	Australia; New Zealand; South Africa	4 (4)	2 (2)	2 (2)	0 (0)	83 (83)	91 (91)
2004	New Zealand in Europe	England; Wales; France; Italy	4 (3)	4 (3)	0 (0)	0 (0)	177 (130)	60 (41)
2005	Fiji	New Zealand	1 (1)	1 (1)	0 (0)	0 (0)	91 (91)	0 (0)
2005	British & Irish Lions	New Zealand	3 (3)	3 (3)	0 (0)	0 (0)	107 (107)	40 (40)
2005	Tri-Nations	Australia; New Zealand; South Africa	4 (4)	3 (3)	1 (1)	0 (0)	111 (111)	86 (86)
2005	New Zealand in British Isles	United Kingdom; Ireland	4 (4)	4 (4)	0 (0)	0 (0)	138 (138)	39 (39)
2006	Mid-year series	New Zealand; Argentina	3 (3)	3 (3)	0 (0)	0 (0)	86 (86)	59 (59)
2006	Tri-Nations	Australia; New Zealand; South Africa	6 (6)	5 (5)	1 (1)	0 (0)	179 (179)	112 (112)
2006	New Zealand in British Isles and France	England; Wales; France	4 (4)	4 (4)	0 (0)	0 (0)	156 (156)	44 (44)
2007	Mid-year series	New Zealand	3 (3)	3 (3)	0 (0)	0 (0)	167 (167)	34 (34)
2007	Tri-Nations	Australia; New Zealand; South Africa	4 (4)	3 (3)	1 (1)	0 (0)	100 (100)	59 (59)
2007	Rugby World Cup	France; Scotland; Wales	5 (5)	4 (4)	1 (1)	0 (0)	327 (327)	55 (55)
2008	Mid-year series	New Zealand	3 (3)	3 (3)	0 (0)	0 (0)	102 (102)	43 (43)
2008	Tri-Nations	Australia; New Zealand; South Africa	6 (6)	4 (4)	2 (2)	0 (0)	152 (152)	106 (106)
2008	End-of-year tour	Hong Kong; Scotland; Ireland; Wales; England	6 (6)	6 (6)	0 (0)	0 (0)	152 (152)	100 (100)
2009	Mid-year series	New Zealand	3 (3)	2 (2)	1 (1)	0 (0)	63 (63)	43 (43)
2009	Tri-Nations	Australia; New Zealand; South Africa	6 (6)	3 (3)	3 (3)	0 (0)	141 (141)	131 (131)
2009	End-of-year tour	Japan; Wales; Italy; England; France	6 (6)	5 (5)	1 (1)	0 (0)	147 (147)	80 (80)
2010	Mid-year series	Japan; Wales; Italy; England; France	3 (3)	3 (3)	0 (0)	0 (0)	137 (137)	47 (47)
2010	Tri-Nations	Australia; New Zealand; South Africa	6 (6)	6 (6)	0 (0)	0 (0)	184 (184)	111 (111)
2010	End-of-year tour	Hong Kong; Scotland; Wales; England; Ireland	5 (5)	4 (4)	1 (1)	0 (0)	174 (174)	88 (88)
2011	Fiji in New Zealand	New Zealand	1 (1)	1 (1)	0 (0)	0 (0)	60 (60)	14 (14)
2011	Tri-Nations	Australia; New Zealand; South Africa	4 (4)	2 (2)	2 (2)	0 (0)	95 (95)	64 (64)
2011	Rugby World Cup	New Zealand	7 (7)	7 (7)	0 (0)	0 (0)	301 (301)	72 (72)
2012	Ireland in New Zealand	New Zealand	3 (3)	3 (3)	0 (0)	0 (0)	124 (124)	29 (29)
2012	Rugby Championship	Australia; New Zealand; South Africa; Argentina	7 (7)	6 (6)	0 (0)	1 (1)	195 (195)	84 (84)
2012	End-of-year tour	Scotland; Italy; Wales; England	4 (4)	3 (3)	1 (1)	0 (0)	147 (147)	80 (80)
2013	Mid-year series	New Zealand	3 (3)	3 (3)	0 (0)	0 (0)	77 (77)	22 (22)
2013	Rugby Championship	Australia; New Zealand; South Africa; Argentina	7 (7)	7 (7)	0 (0)	0 (0)	243 (243)	148 (148)
2013	End-of-year tour	Japan; England; Wales; Ireland	4 (4)	4 (4)	0 (0)	0 (0)	134 (134)	69 (69)
2014	2014 England rugby union tour of New Zealand	England; New Zealand	3 (3)	3 (3)	0 (0)	0 (0)		
2014	End-of-year tour	United States; England; Scotland; Wales	4 (4)	4 (4)	0 (0)	0 (0)		
2016	2016 Wales rugby union tour of New Zealand	Wales; New Zealand	3 (3)	3 (3)	0 (0)	0 (0)		
2016	End-of-year tour	Ireland; Italy; Ireland; France	4 (4)	3 (4)	1 (1)	0 (0)		
2017	Samoa in New Zealand	Samoa	1 (1)	1 (1)	0 (0)	0 (0)	78	0
2017	2017 British and Irish Lions Tour of New Zealand	United Kingdom; Ireland	3 (3)	1 (1)	1 (1)	1 (1)	66	54
2017	Investec Rugby Championship	South Africa; Australia; Argentina	7 (7)	6 (6)	1 (1)	0 (0)	264	142
2017	End-of-year Tour	France; Scotland; Wales; Barbarians	5 (3)	5 (5)	0 (0)	0 (0)	152	98
2018	Steinlager Series	France	3 (3)	3 (3)	0 (0)	0 (0)	127	38
2018	Investec Rugby Championship	South Africa; Australia; Argentina	6 (6)	5 (5)	1 (1)	0 (0)	225	132
2018	End-of-year Tour	Australia; Japan; England; Ireland; Italy	5 (5)	4 (4)	1 (1)	0 (0)	197	85

== See also ==
- List of All Blacks
- List of New Zealand rugby union test matches

== Bibliography ==
- All Blacks Tour 1963–64, Mulligan Andrew, Souvenir Press (1964), ASIN B0019OAAN8
- Henry's All Blacks: The 2007 World Cup Campaign, Murray Deaker, HarperCollins Publishers (New Zealand) (25 April 2008), ISBN 1-86950-668-5
- Goodbye to Glory: All Blacks Tour of South Africa, 1976, Terry McLean, Pelham Books (June 1977), ISBN 0-7207-0997-0
