= Bledisloe Cup =

Rugby union competition between Australia and New Zealand

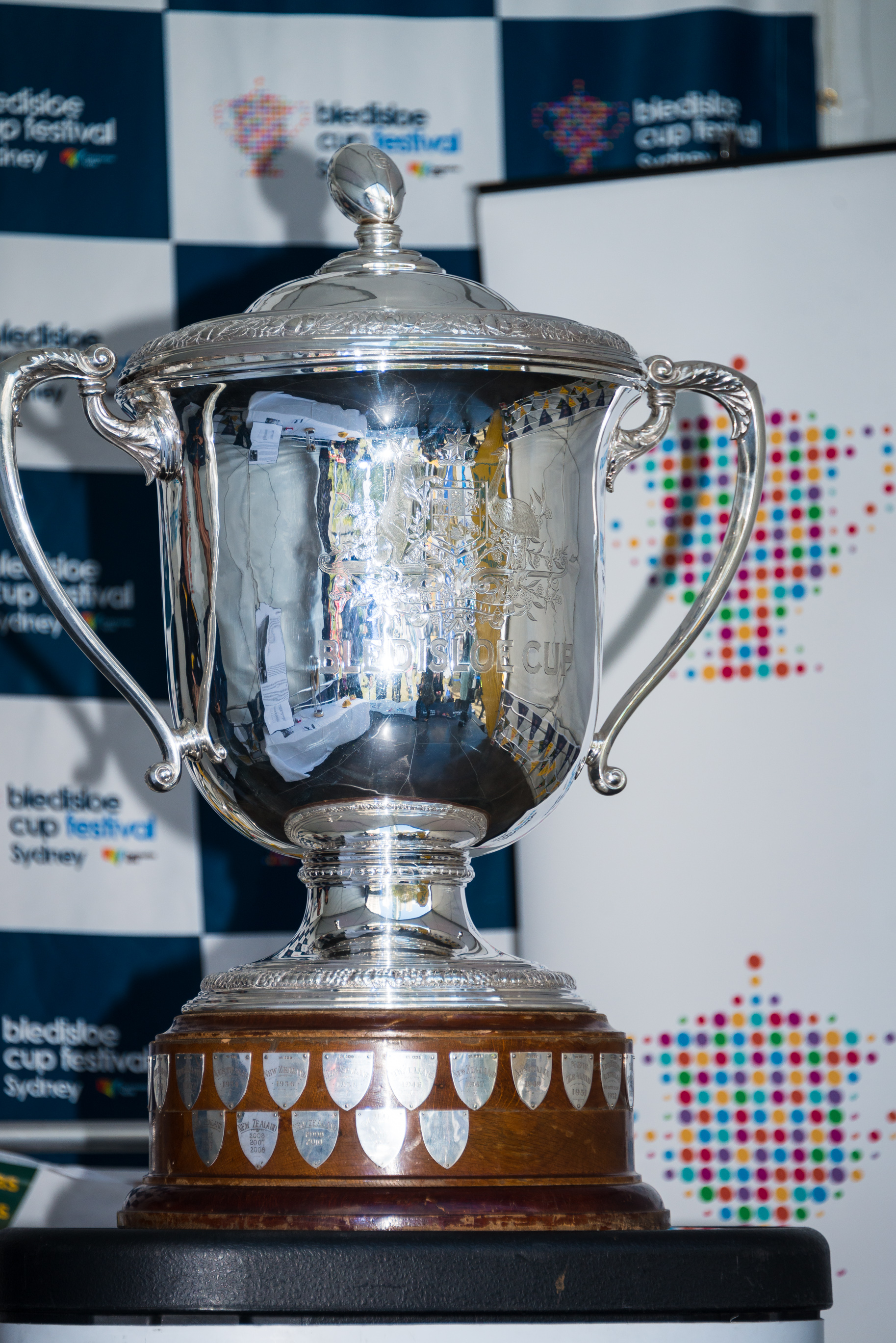
- Sport: Rugby union
- Awarded for: Winner between Australia–New Zealand series (Note: Since 1996, the cup has consistently been played during the annual Tri Nations Series/The Rugby Championship. Conventionally over a three-match series, eight (1967, 1979, 1983, 1985, 1987, 1989, 1993, 1994) of the cup series' sixty-three arrangements have been one-off matches. Since 2022 the cup has been a two-match, home-and-away series.)
- Country: Australia; New Zealand

History
- Editions: 67
- First winner: New Zealand (1932)
- Most wins: New Zealand (54)
- Most recent: New Zealand (2026)

The Bledisloe Cup is an annual rugby union competition between the national teams of Australia's Wallabies and New Zealand's All Blacks that has been contested since the 1930s. The frequency that the competition is held has varied, as has the number of matches played in each tournament, but it currently consists of an annual two-match series, with the matches counting towards The Rugby Championship. New Zealand has had the most success, winning the trophy in 2026 for the 54th time and 23rd in succession (excluding the disputed inaugural competition in 1931), while Australia has won the trophy 12 times.

== History ==
Semantics plays a role in the issue of when the inaugural Bledisloe Cup match was played. The Australian Rugby Union (ARU) contend that the one-off 1931 match played at Eden Park was first. The only record of a match taking place is recorded in the minutes of a New Zealand union management meeting several days later that Lord Bledisloe wished to present a cup for the All Blacks and Wallabies competition. The New Zealand Rugby Union (NZRU) believe that the first match was when New Zealand toured Australia in 1932.

Between 1931 and 1981, the Bledisloe Cup was contested irregularly in the course of rugby tours between the two countries, with New Zealand winning it nineteen times and Australia four times. In 1949, Australia won the competition for the first time on New Zealand soil. The trophy itself was apparently 'lost' during this period and reportedly rediscovered in a Melbourne store room. It was contested annually from 1982 to 1995, sometimes as a series of three matches (two in 1995) and other times in a single match. During these years, New Zealand won the trophy eleven times and Australia three times.

Since 1996, the cup has been contested as part of the annual Tri Nations tournament. Until 1998, the cup was contested in a three-match series consisting of the two Tri Nations matches between the two sides and a third match. New Zealand won the series in 1996 and 1997, and Australia won it in 1998.

In 1996, and from 1999 through 2005, the third match was not played; during these years, Australia and New Zealand played each other twice as part of the Tri Nations for the cup. If the two teams won one game each, or if both games were drawn, the cup was retained by its current holder. The non-holder needed to win the two games 2–0 or 1–0 (with a draw) to regain the cup. A criticism of this system was that, with the two sides being very well matched in ability level, it was very common for the teams to win one game each and many rugby fans were dissatisfied with one team keeping the cup in the years when the series was tied at 1–1 (1999, 2000, 2002, 2004).

In 2006, the Tri Nations series was extended so that each team played each other three times, meaning a return of the three-game contest for the Bledisloe Cup. However, the cup reverted to the two-game contest in 2007 because the Tri Nations was abbreviated that year to minimise interference with the teams' preparations for the World Cup.

The three-match format for the Bledisloe Cup continued in 2012, with the first two matches taking place as part of the 2012 Rugby Championship.

== Neutral venues ==
Discussions have been held at various times to stage matches in Asia and north America. A formal proposal came from Denver, Colorado, USA for a fixture in 2009 which did not eventuate. A few games have been played in Hong Kong and Japan without regular continuity as of 2025.

=== Hong Kong ===
In 2008 the Bledisloe Cup was contested over four matches played in Sydney, Auckland, Brisbane and Hong Kong, in an effort to promote the game in Asia. This was the first time Australia and New Zealand had played in a third country outside the Rugby World Cup. The Hong Kong match drew a crowd of 39,000 to see the All Blacks defeat the Wallabies 19–14 (New Zealand having already won the Cup for that year). The fixture reportedly generated over £5.5 million—a financial success for the two unions. A fourth match was again played in Hong Kong in 2010—Australia winning by 26-24—but ticket sales fell well short of expectations.

=== Japan ===
The capital Tokyo hosted a fourth Bledisloe test match on 31 October 2009, which the All Blacks won by 32-19. The game was heavily publicised to "raise the profile of rugby in the region in the run-up to the 2019 Rugby World Cup in Japan, and help bring more youngsters into playing the game."

On 27 October 2018, the Bledisloe Cup returned to Japan for a second contest hosted this time in Yokohama with the purpose of promoting and preparing for the 2019 Rugby World Cup. The All Blacks defeated the Wallabies 37–20 in that third test to sweep the series. Attendance was around 46,000—a record for a rugby test match in Japan at the time.

== Future proposals ==
Behind the push from World Rugby with their League of Nations concept, only one match result would count for League of Nations points but the new season schedule must be able to accommodate a second test each year in the new format. The gate receipts from Bledisloe Cup match-ups are critical to both Rugby Australia and New Zealand Rugby Union and both nations are firm in their belief that one home match is mandatory. The third Bledisloe, which has long been a cash cow for both nations, could cease to exist. Any cash lost from forfeiting that match would be compensated by A$18 million per year in League of Nations broadcast revenue.

== Results ==
Year	Date	Venue	Home	Score	Away	Series Winner	Result	Trophy Holder
1932 (Note: Tour series.)	2 July	Sydney Cricket Ground, Sydney	Australia	22–17	New Zealand	New Zealand	2–1	New Zealand
1932	16 July	Exhibition Ground, Brisbane	Australia	3–21	New Zealand	New Zealand	2–1	New Zealand
1932	23 July	Sydney Cricket Ground, Sydney	Australia	13–21	New Zealand	New Zealand	2–1	New Zealand
1934	11 August	Sydney Cricket Ground, Sydney	Australia	25–11	New Zealand	Australia	1–0	Australia
1934	25 August	Sydney Cricket Ground, Sydney	Australia	3–3	New Zealand	Australia	1–0	Australia
1936	5 September	Athletic Park, Wellington	New Zealand	11–6	Australia	New Zealand	2–0	New Zealand
1936	12 September	Carisbrook, Dunedin	New Zealand	38–13	Australia	New Zealand	2–0	New Zealand
1938	23 July	Sydney Cricket Ground, Sydney	Australia	9–24	New Zealand	New Zealand	3–0	New Zealand
1938	6 August	Exhibition Ground, Brisbane	Australia	14–20	New Zealand	New Zealand	3–0	New Zealand
1938	13 August	Sydney Cricket Ground, Sydney	Australia	6–14	New Zealand	New Zealand	3–0	New Zealand
1946	14 September	Carisbrook, Dunedin	New Zealand	31–8	Australia	New Zealand	2–0	New Zealand
1946	28 September	Eden Park, Auckland	New Zealand	14–10	Australia	New Zealand	2–0	New Zealand
1947	14 June	Exhibition Ground, Brisbane	Australia	5–13	New Zealand	New Zealand	2–0	New Zealand
1947	28 June	Sydney Cricket Ground, Sydney	Australia	14–27	New Zealand	New Zealand	2–0	New Zealand
1949	3 September	Athletic Park, Wellington	New Zealand	6–11	Australia	Australia	2–0	Australia
1949	24 September	Eden Park, Auckland	New Zealand	9–16	Australia	Australia	2–0	Australia
1951	23 June	Sydney Cricket Ground, Sydney	Australia	0–8	New Zealand	New Zealand	3–0	New Zealand
1951	7 July	Sydney Cricket Ground, Sydney	Australia	11–17	New Zealand	New Zealand	3–0	New Zealand
1951	21 July	The Gabba, Brisbane	Australia	6–16	New Zealand	New Zealand	3–0	New Zealand
1952	6 September	Lancaster Park, Christchurch	New Zealand	9–14	Australia	Draw	1–1	New Zealand
1952	13 September	Athletic Park, Wellington	New Zealand	15–8	Australia	Draw	1–1	New Zealand
1955	20 August	Athletic Park, Wellington	New Zealand	16–8	Australia	New Zealand	2–1	New Zealand
1955	3 September	Carisbrook, Dunedin	New Zealand	8–0	Australia	New Zealand	2–1	New Zealand
1955	17 September	Eden Park, Auckland	New Zealand	3–8	Australia	New Zealand	2–1	New Zealand
1957	25 May	Sydney Cricket Ground, Sydney	Australia	11–25	New Zealand	New Zealand	2–0	New Zealand
1957	1 June	Exhibition Ground, Brisbane	Australia	9–22	New Zealand	New Zealand	2–0	New Zealand
1958	23 August	Athletic Park, Wellington	New Zealand	25–3	Australia	New Zealand	2–1	New Zealand
1958	6 September	Lancaster Park, Christchurch	New Zealand	3–6	Australia	New Zealand	2–1	New Zealand
1958	20 September	Epsom Showgrounds, Auckland	New Zealand	17–8	Australia	New Zealand	2–1	New Zealand
1962 (Note: New Zealand tour of Australia, Autumn/Winter 1962.)	26 May	Exhibition Ground, Brisbane	Australia	6–20	New Zealand	New Zealand	2–0	New Zealand
1962	4 June	Sydney Cricket Ground, Sydney	Australia	5–14	New Zealand	New Zealand	2–0	New Zealand
1962 (Note: Australian tour of New Zealand, Winter/Spring 1962.)	25 August	Athletic Park, Wellington	New Zealand	9–9	Australia	New Zealand	2–0	New Zealand
1962	8 September	Carisbrook, Dunedin	New Zealand	3–0	Australia	New Zealand	2–0	New Zealand
1962	22 September	Eden Park, Auckland	New Zealand	16–8	Australia	New Zealand	2–0	New Zealand
1964	15 August	Carisbrook, Dunedin	New Zealand	14–9	Australia	New Zealand	2–1	New Zealand
1964	22 August	Lancaster Park, Christchurch	New Zealand	18–3	Australia	New Zealand	2–1	New Zealand
1964	29 August	Athletic Park, Wellington	New Zealand	5–20	Australia	New Zealand	2–1	New Zealand
1967	19 August	Athletic Park, Wellington	New Zealand	29–9	Australia	New Zealand	1–0	New Zealand
1968	15 June	Sydney Cricket Ground, Sydney	Australia	11–27	New Zealand	New Zealand	2–0	New Zealand
1968	22 June	Ballymore, Brisbane	Australia	18–19	New Zealand	New Zealand	2–0	New Zealand
1972	19 August	Athletic Park, Wellington	New Zealand	29–6	Australia	New Zealand	3–0	New Zealand
1972	2 September	Lancaster Park, Christchurch	New Zealand	30–17	Australia	New Zealand	3–0	New Zealand
1972	16 September	Eden Park, Auckland	New Zealand	38–3	Australia	New Zealand	3–0	New Zealand
1974	25 May	Sydney Cricket Ground, Sydney	Australia	6–11	New Zealand	New Zealand	2–0	New Zealand
1974	1 June	Ballymore, Brisbane	Australia	16–16	New Zealand	New Zealand	2–0	New Zealand
1974	8 June	Sydney Cricket Ground, Sydney	Australia	6–16	New Zealand	New Zealand	2–0	New Zealand
1978	19 August	Athletic Park, Wellington	New Zealand	13–12	Australia	New Zealand	2–1	New Zealand
1978	26 August	Lancaster Park, Christchurch	New Zealand	22–6	Australia	New Zealand	2–1	New Zealand
1978	9 September	Eden Park, Auckland	New Zealand	16–30	Australia	New Zealand	2–1	New Zealand
1979	28 July	Sydney Cricket Ground, Sydney	Australia	12–6	New Zealand	Australia	1–0	Australia
1980	21 June	Sydney Cricket Ground, Sydney	Australia	13–9	New Zealand	Australia	2–1	Australia
1980	28 June	Ballymore, Brisbane	Australia	9–12	New Zealand	Australia	2–1	Australia
1980	12 July	Sydney Cricket Ground, Sydney	Australia	26–10	New Zealand	Australia	2–1	Australia
1982	14 August	Lancaster Park, Christchurch	New Zealand	23–16	Australia	New Zealand	2–1	New Zealand
1982	28 August	Athletic Park, Wellington	New Zealand	16–19	Australia	New Zealand	2–1	New Zealand
1982	11 September	Eden Park, Auckland	New Zealand	33–18	Australia	New Zealand	2–1	New Zealand
1983	20 August	Sydney Cricket Ground, Sydney	Australia	8–18	New Zealand	New Zealand	1–0	New Zealand
1984	21 July	Sydney Cricket Ground, Sydney	Australia	16–9	New Zealand	New Zealand	2–1	New Zealand
1984	4 August	Ballymore, Brisbane	Australia	15–19	New Zealand	New Zealand	2–1	New Zealand
1984	18 August	Sydney Cricket Ground, Sydney	Australia	24–25	New Zealand	New Zealand	2–1	New Zealand
1985	29 June	Eden Park, Auckland	New Zealand	10–9	Australia	New Zealand	1–0	New Zealand
1986	9 August	Athletic Park, Wellington	New Zealand	12–13	Australia	Australia	2–1	Australia
1986	23 August	Carisbrook, Dunedin	New Zealand	13–12	Australia	Australia	2–1	Australia
1986	6 September	Eden Park, Auckland	New Zealand	9–22	Australia	Australia	2–1	Australia
1987	25 July	Concord Oval, Sydney	Australia	16–30	New Zealand	New Zealand	1–0	New Zealand
1988	3 July	Concord Oval, Sydney	Australia	7–32	New Zealand	New Zealand	2–0	New Zealand
1988	16 July	Ballymore, Brisbane	Australia	19–19	New Zealand	New Zealand	2–0	New Zealand
1988	30 July	Concord Oval, Sydney	Australia	9–30	New Zealand	New Zealand	2–0	New Zealand
1989	5 August	Eden Park, Auckland	New Zealand	24–12	Australia	New Zealand	1–0	New Zealand
1990	21 July	Lancaster Park, Christchurch	New Zealand	21–6	Australia	New Zealand	2–1	New Zealand
1990	4 August	Eden Park, Auckland	New Zealand	27–17	Australia	New Zealand	2–1	New Zealand
1990	18 August	Athletic Park, Wellington	New Zealand	9–21	Australia	New Zealand	2–1	New Zealand
1991	10 August	Sydney Football Stadium, Sydney	Australia	21–12	New Zealand	Draw	1–1	New Zealand
1991	24 August	Eden Park, Auckland	New Zealand	6–3	Australia	Draw	1–1	New Zealand
1992	4 July	Sydney Football Stadium, Sydney	Australia	16–15	New Zealand	Australia	2–1	Australia
1992	19 July	Ballymore, Brisbane	Australia	19–17	New Zealand	Australia	2–1	Australia
1992	25 July	Sydney Football Stadium, Sydney	Australia	23–26	New Zealand	Australia	2–1	Australia
1993	17 July	Carisbrook, Dunedin	New Zealand	25–10	Australia	New Zealand	1–0	New Zealand
1994	17 August	Sydney Football Stadium, Sydney	Australia	20–16	New Zealand	Australia	1–0	Australia
1995	22 July	Eden Park, Auckland	New Zealand	28–16	Australia	New Zealand	2–0	New Zealand
1995	29 July	Sydney Football Stadium, Sydney	Australia	23–34	New Zealand	New Zealand	2–0	New Zealand
1996	6 July	Athletic Park, Wellington	New Zealand	43–6	Australia	New Zealand	2–0	New Zealand
1996	27 July	Lang Park, Brisbane	Australia	25–32	New Zealand	New Zealand	2–0	New Zealand
1997	5 July	Lancaster Park, Christchurch	New Zealand	30–13	Australia	New Zealand	3–0	New Zealand
1997	26 July	Melbourne Cricket Ground, Melbourne	Australia	18–33	New Zealand	New Zealand	3–0	New Zealand
1997	16 August	Carisbrook, Dunedin	New Zealand	36–24	Australia	New Zealand	3–0	New Zealand
1998	11 July	Melbourne Cricket Ground, Melbourne	Australia	24–16	New Zealand	Australia	3–0	Australia
1998	1 August	Lancaster Park, Christchurch	New Zealand	23–27	Australia	Australia	3–0	Australia
1998	29 August	Sydney Football Stadium, Sydney	Australia	19–14	New Zealand	Australia	3–0	Australia
1999	24 July	Eden Park, Auckland	New Zealand	34–15	Australia	Draw	1–1	Australia
1999	28 August	Stadium Australia, Sydney	Australia	28–7	New Zealand	Draw	1–1	Australia
2000	15 July	Stadium Australia, Sydney	Australia	35–39	New Zealand	Draw	1–1	Australia
2000	5 August	Wellington Regional Stadium, Wellington	New Zealand	23–24	Australia	Draw	1–1	Australia
2001	11 August	Carisbrook, Dunedin	New Zealand	15–23	Australia	Australia	2–0	Australia
2001	1 September	Stadium Australia, Sydney	Australia	29–26	New Zealand	Australia	2–0	Australia
2002	13 July	Lancaster Park, Christchurch	New Zealand	12–6	Australia	Draw	1–1	Australia
2002	3 August	Stadium Australia, Sydney	Australia	16–14	New Zealand	Draw	1–1	Australia
2003	26 July	Stadium Australia, Sydney	Australia	21–50	New Zealand	New Zealand	2–0	New Zealand
2003	16 August	Eden Park, Auckland	New Zealand	21–17	Australia	New Zealand	2–0	New Zealand
2004	17 July	Wellington Regional Stadium, Wellington	New Zealand	16–7	Australia	Draw	1–1	New Zealand
2004	7 August	Stadium Australia, Sydney	Australia	23–18	New Zealand	Draw	1–1	New Zealand
2005	13 August	Stadium Australia, Sydney	Australia	13–30	New Zealand	New Zealand	2–0	New Zealand
2005	3 September	Eden Park, Auckland	New Zealand	34–24	Australia	New Zealand	2–0	New Zealand
2006	8 July	Lancaster Park, Christchurch	New Zealand	32–12	Australia	New Zealand	3–0	New Zealand
2006	29 July	Lang Park, Brisbane	Australia	9–13	New Zealand	New Zealand	3–0	New Zealand
2006	19 August	Eden Park, Auckland	New Zealand	34–27	Australia	New Zealand	3–0	New Zealand
2007	30 June	Melbourne Cricket Ground, Melbourne	Australia	20–15	New Zealand	Draw	1–1	New Zealand
2007	21 July	Eden Park, Auckland	New Zealand	26–12	Australia	Draw	1–1	New Zealand
2008	26 July	Stadium Australia, Sydney	Australia	34–19	New Zealand	New Zealand	3–1	New Zealand
2008	2 August	Eden Park, Auckland	New Zealand	39–10	Australia	New Zealand	3–1	New Zealand
2008	13 September	Lang Park, Brisbane	Australia	24–28	New Zealand	New Zealand	3–1	New Zealand
2008	1 November	Hong Kong Stadium, Hong Kong	New Zealand	19–14	Australia	New Zealand	3–1	New Zealand
2009	18 July	Eden Park, Auckland	New Zealand	22–16	Australia	New Zealand	4–0	New Zealand
2009	22 August	Stadium Australia, Sydney	Australia	18–19	New Zealand	New Zealand	4–0	New Zealand
2009	19 September	Wellington Regional Stadium, Wellington	New Zealand	33–6	Australia	New Zealand	4–0	New Zealand
2009	31 October	National Stadium, Tokyo	New Zealand	32–19	Australia	New Zealand	4–0	New Zealand
2010	31 July	Docklands Stadium, Melbourne	Australia	28–49	New Zealand	New Zealand	3–1	New Zealand
2010	7 August	Lancaster Park, Christchurch	New Zealand	20–10	Australia	New Zealand	3–1	New Zealand
2010	11 September	Stadium Australia, Sydney	Australia	22–23	New Zealand	New Zealand	3–1	New Zealand
2010	30 October	Hong Kong Stadium, Hong Kong	Australia	26–24	New Zealand	New Zealand	3–1	New Zealand
2011	6 August	Eden Park, Auckland	New Zealand	30–14	Australia	Draw	1–1	New Zealand
2011	27 August	Lang Park, Brisbane	Australia	25–20	New Zealand	Draw	1–1	New Zealand
2012	18 August	Stadium Australia, Sydney	Australia	19–27	New Zealand	New Zealand	2–0	New Zealand
2012	25 August	Eden Park, Auckland	New Zealand	22–0	Australia	New Zealand	2–0	New Zealand
2012	20 October	Lang Park, Brisbane	Australia	18–18	New Zealand	New Zealand	2–0	New Zealand
2013	17 August	Stadium Australia, Sydney	Australia	29–47	New Zealand	New Zealand	3–0	New Zealand
2013	24 August	Wellington Regional Stadium, Wellington	New Zealand	27–16	Australia	New Zealand	3–0	New Zealand
2013	19 October	Forsyth Barr Stadium, Dunedin	New Zealand	41–33	Australia	New Zealand	3–0	New Zealand
2014	16 August	Stadium Australia, Sydney	Australia	12–12	New Zealand	New Zealand	2–0	New Zealand
2014	23 August	Eden Park, Auckland	New Zealand	51–20	Australia	New Zealand	2–0	New Zealand
2014	18 October	Lang Park, Brisbane	Australia	28–29	New Zealand	New Zealand	2–0	New Zealand
2015	8 August	Stadium Australia, Sydney	Australia	27–19	New Zealand	Draw	1–1	New Zealand
2015	15 August	Eden Park, Auckland	New Zealand	41–13	Australia	Draw	1–1	New Zealand
2016	20 August	Stadium Australia, Sydney	Australia	8–42	New Zealand	New Zealand	3–0	New Zealand
2016	27 August	Wellington Regional Stadium, Wellington	New Zealand	29–9	Australia	New Zealand	3–0	New Zealand
2016	22 October	Eden Park, Auckland	New Zealand	37–10	Australia	New Zealand	3–0	New Zealand
2017	19 August	Stadium Australia, Sydney	Australia	34–54	New Zealand	New Zealand	2–1	New Zealand
2017	26 August	Forsyth Barr Stadium, Dunedin	New Zealand	35–29	Australia	New Zealand	2–1	New Zealand
2017	21 October	Lang Park, Brisbane	Australia	23–18	New Zealand	New Zealand	2–1	New Zealand
2018	18 August	Stadium Australia, Sydney	Australia	13–38	New Zealand	New Zealand	3–0	New Zealand
2018	25 August	Eden Park, Auckland	New Zealand	40–12	Australia	New Zealand	3–0	New Zealand
2018	27 October	Nissan Stadium, Yokohama	New Zealand	37–20	Australia	New Zealand	3–0	New Zealand
2019	10 August	Perth Stadium, Perth	Australia	47–26	New Zealand	Draw	1–1	New Zealand
2019	17 August	Eden Park, Auckland	New Zealand	36–0	Australia	Draw	1–1	New Zealand
2020	11 October (Note: Postponed from 8 August 2020.)	Wellington Regional Stadium, Wellington	New Zealand	16–16	Australia	New Zealand	2–1	New Zealand
2020	18 October (Note: Postponed from 15 August 2020.)	Eden Park, Auckland	New Zealand	27–7	Australia	New Zealand	2–1	New Zealand
2020	31 October	Stadium Australia, Sydney	Australia	5–43	New Zealand	New Zealand	2–1	New Zealand
2020	7 November	Lang Park, Brisbane	Australia	24–22	New Zealand	New Zealand	2–1	New Zealand
2021	7 August (Note: Two tests were played at Eden Park due to COVID-19)	Eden Park, Auckland	New Zealand	33–25	Australia	New Zealand	3–0	New Zealand
2021	14 August	Eden Park, Auckland	New Zealand	57–22	Australia	New Zealand	3–0	New Zealand
2021	5 September	Perth Stadium, Perth	Australia	21–38	New Zealand	New Zealand	3–0	New Zealand
2022	15 September	Docklands Stadium, Melbourne	Australia	37–39	New Zealand	New Zealand	2–0	New Zealand
2022	24 September	Eden Park, Auckland	New Zealand	40–14	Australia	New Zealand	2–0	New Zealand
2023	29 July	Melbourne Cricket Ground, Melbourne	Australia	7–38	New Zealand	New Zealand	2–0	New Zealand
2023	5 August	Forsyth Barr Stadium, Dunedin	New Zealand	23–20	Australia	New Zealand	2–0	New Zealand
2024	21 September	Stadium Australia, Sydney	Australia	28–31	New Zealand	New Zealand	2–0	New Zealand
2024	28 September	Wellington Regional Stadium, Wellington	New Zealand	33–13	Australia	New Zealand	2–0	New Zealand
2025	27 September	Eden Park, Auckland	New Zealand	33–24	Australia	New Zealand	2–0	New Zealand
2025	4 October	Perth Stadium, Perth	Australia	14–28	New Zealand	New Zealand	2–0	New Zealand
2026	10 October	Eden Park, Auckland	New Zealand	50–19	Australia	New Zealand	2–0	New Zealand
2026	17 October	Stadium Australia, Sydney	Australia	21–43	New Zealand	New Zealand	2–0	New Zealand

== Matches and statistics ==
=== Match stats ===
As of 5 August 2023.

Series' stats by match
Venue	Played	Won by		Drawn	Total points	
Venue	Played	Australia	New Zealand	Drawn	Australia	New Zealand
Australia	74	22	47	5	1,274	1,674
New Zealand	78	14	62	2	1,004	1,801
Neutral venue	4	1	3	—N/a	79	112
Overall	156	37	112	7	2,357	3,587

As of 17 October 2026.

Series' stats by series (Note: Post-1994, both sides have consistently played series matches on a home/away basis, with an occasional neutral venue.)
Venue	Played	Won by		Drawn
Venue	Played	Australia	New Zealand	Drawn
Australia	17	5	12	—N/a
New Zealand	17	2	14	1
Mixed (Note: Includes the series' where the venues were played at home, away and/or a neutral venue.)	33	5	25	—N/a
Overall	67	12	54 (Note: Does not include the 12 September 1931 "one-off" test match at Eden Park, Auckland.)	1

=== Venues ===
As of 5 August 2023.

==== In Australia ====
Location	Stadium	Won by Australia	Won by New Zealand	Drawn
Sydney, New South Wales	Sydney Cricket Ground	6	13	1
Sydney, New South Wales	Concord Oval	—N/a	3	—N/a
Sydney, New South Wales	Sydney Football Stadium	4	2	—N/a
Sydney, New South Wales	Stadium Australia	6	11	1
Brisbane, Queensland	Brisbane Exhibition Ground	—N/a	5	—N/a
Brisbane, Queensland	The Gabba	—N/a	1	—N/a
Brisbane, Queensland	Ballymore Stadium	1	3	2
Brisbane, Queensland	Lang Park	2	4	1
Melbourne, Victoria	Melbourne Cricket Ground	2	2	—N/a
Melbourne, Victoria	Docklands Stadium	—N/a	2	—N/a
Perth, Western Australia	Perth Stadium	1	1	—N/a
Overall		22	47	5

==== In New Zealand ====
Location	City/Region	Stadium	Won by New Zealand	Won by Australia	Drawn
North Island	Auckland	Eden Park	29	4	—N/a
North Island	Auckland	Epsom Showgrounds	1	—N/a	—N/a
North Island	Wellington	Athletic Park	8	5	1
North Island	Wellington	Wellington Regional Stadium	4	1	1
South Island	Dunedin	Carisbrook	8	1	—N/a
South Island	Dunedin	Forsyth Barr Stadium	3	—N/a	—N/a
South Island	Christchurch	Lancaster Park	9	3	—N/a
Overall			62	14	2

== Media coverage ==
In Australia, the Bledisloe Cup was televised between 1957 and 1991 by ABC, between 1992 and 1995 by Network Ten. Since 1996, paid service Fox Sports has televised it jointly with (free to air) Seven Network between 1996 and 2010, Nine Network (2011–2012), Network Ten (2013–2020) and since 2021 the Nine Network has held full broadcast rights alongside its paid streaming arm Stan Sport.

In New Zealand the Bledisloe Cup was televised between 1962 and 1996 by NZBC, Television One, TVNZ. Since 1997 the Bledisloe Cup has been televised by Sky Sport on Pay TV and Free To Air on TV3, Prime now called Sky Open.

== See also ==
- History of rugby union matches between Australia and New Zealand
- Laurie O'Reilly Cup
- Rugby union trophies and awards
