= 1957 New Zealand rugby union tour of Australia =

Summary
P	W	D	L
Total
13	13	0	0
Test match
2	2	0	0
Opponent
P	W	D	L
Australia
2	2	0	0

The 1957 New Zealand tour rugby to Australia was the 19th tour by the New Zealand national rugby union team to Australia.

The last tour of "All Blacks" in Australia was the 1947 tour, then Australians visit New Zealand in 1952 and in 1955

All Blacks won all both test matches and the Bledisloe Cup, lost in 1949.

== The tour ==
Scores and results list All Blacks' points tally first.

Opposing Team	For	Against	Date	Venue	Status
New South Wales	19	3	18 May 1957	Moore Park, Sydney	Tour match
Western NSW	33	6	22 May 1957	Warren	Tour match
Australia	25	11	25 May 1957	Cricket Ground, Sydney	Test match
Queensland	30	0	28 May 1957	Ekka Ground, Brisbane	Tour match
Australia	22	9	1 June 1957	Ekka Ground, Brisbane	Test match
New England	38	14	5 June 1957	Kitchener Oval, Gunnedah	Tour match
Newcastle	20	9	8 June 1957	Sportsground, Newcastle	Tour match
South-West Zone	86	0	12 June 1957	Lawson Park, Grenfell	Tour match
A.C.T.	40	8	15 June 1957	Manuka Oval, Canberra	Tour match
Australian Barbarians	23	6	17 June 1957	North Sydney Oval, Sydney	Tour match
Riverina	48	11	19 June 1957	Robertson Oval, Wagga Wagga	Tour match
Victoria	28	3	22 June 1957	Olympic Park, Melbourne	Tour match
South Australia	51	3	26 June 1957	Norwood Oval, Adelaide	Tour match
