= 1991 Australia rugby union tour of New Zealand =

Summary
P	W	D	L
Total
2	1	0	1
Test match
1	0	0	1
Opponent
P	W	D	L
New Zealand
1	0	0	1

The 1991 Australia rugby union tour of New Zealand consisted of two matches played by the Wallabies in August 1991.

This tour was made two weeks after the New Zealand tour of Australia. The Wallabies lost the only test with the All Blacks.

== The Matches ==
Scores and results list Australia's points tally first.

Opposing Team	For	Against	Date	Venue	Status
Counties	17	12	20 August 1991	Growers Stadium, Pukekohe	Tour match
New Zealand	3	6	24 August 1991	Eden Park, Auckland	Test match

== Test Team ==
- Manager: John Breen
- Coach: Bob Dwyer
- Captain: Nick Farr-Jones
- David Campese
- Troy Coker
- Tony Daly
- John Eales
- Bob Egerton
- Tim Horan
- Phil Kearns
- Jason Little
- Michael Lynagh
- Rod McCall
- Ewen McKenzie
- Viliami Ofahengaue
- Simon Poidevin
- Marty Roebuck
