= 1923 New South Wales rugby union tour of New Zealand =

Summary
P	W	D	L
Total
10	2	0	8
Test match
3	0	0	3
Opponent
P	W	D	L
New Zealand XV
3	0	0	3

The 1923 Waratahs tour of New Zealand was a series of rugby union games undertaken by the New South Wales Teams against invitational and national teams of New Zealand.

The Queensland Rugby Union had collapsed in 1919 and would not be reborn until 1929 leaving the New South Wales Rugby Union to administer the game in Australia at the national representative level. In 1923 the New South Wales side toured New Zealand

Previously the All Blacks visited New South Wales in the 1922 tour.

== Matches ==
Scores and results list Waratahs' points tally first.

Opposing Team	For	Against	Date	Venue	Status
Wellington / Manawatu	16	23	19 August 1923	Athletic Park, Wellington	Tour match
South Canterbury	23	10	23 August 1923	Fraser Park, Timaru	Tour match
New Zealand XV	9	19	25 August 1923	Carisbrook, Dunedin	Test match
Southland	9	31	29 August 1923	Rugby Park, Invercargill	Tour match
New Zealand XV	6	34	1 September 1923	Lancaster Park, Christchurch	Test match
Hawke's Bay / Poverty Bay / East Coast	15	32	5 September 1923	McLean Park, Napier	Tour match
Auckland	11	27	8 September 1923	Eden Park, Auckland	Tour match
South Auckland	11	6	12 September 1923	Claudelands Racecourse, Hamilton	Tour match
New Zealand XV	11	38	15 September 1923	Athletic Park, Wellington	Test match
Wairarapa	6	14	18 September 1923	Memorial Park, Masterton	Tour match
