= 1905 Australia rugby union tour of New Zealand =

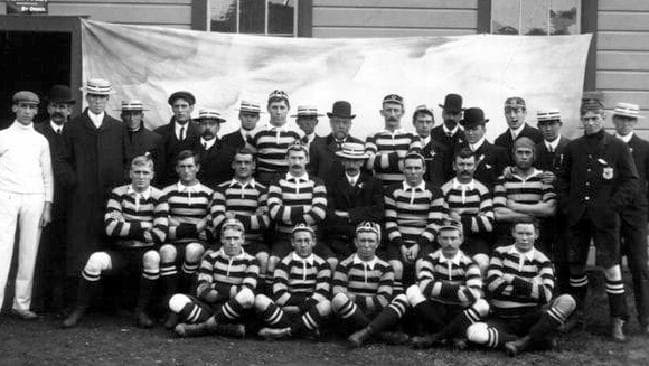
- Australia touring squad
- Tour captain: Stanley Wickham
Summary
P	W	D	L
Total
7	3	0	4
Test match
1	0	0	1
Opponent
P	W	D	L
New Zealand
1	0	0	1

The 1905 Australia tour of New Zealand was a collection of rugby union games undertaken by the Australia side against invitational and national teams of New Zealand. It was the first Wallaby overseas tour.

Australia played a total of seven games in New Zealand, with 3 wins and 4 losses.

== Matches ==
Complete list of matches played by Australia in New Zealand:

=== Wellington RFU ===
19 August 1905

Wellington RFU	23–7	Australia
	Report

Athletic Park, Wellington
Attendance: 8,000

Team details

Wellington RFU: G. Spencer; M. Winiata, J. O'Leary, E. Wrigley; M. Sharpe, A. Ramsden; E.H. Dodd, E.H. Watkins, T. Cross, H.R. Wright, J. Spencer (capt), A.A. Wylie, C. Gillespie, W. Warner, W. Hardham
Australia: A.P. Penman; S. Wickham (capt), P. Carmichael, B. Smith; C. Russell, E.A. Anzelzark, M. Dore; A. Burdon, E.A. Oxlade, J. Clarken, H.A. Judd, P. Burge, W. Hirschberg, B.I. Swannell, C. Murrin

=== Nelson Combined ===
23 August 1905

Nelson Combined (Note: Composed of players from the Nelson Rugby Union.)	12–3	Australia
	Report

?, Nelson
Attendance: 2,000

=== Canterbury ===
26 August 1905

Canterbury RFU	8–3	Australia
	Report

?, Christchurch

Team details

Canterbury: S. Turtill; F. Fryer, A.E. Love, G. Gray; J. Weston, D. Fraser; P. Burns; D. Horgan, Shannon, Murray, G. Chambers, Gaffuey, Carlton, C. Pearce, W.J. Walter Australia: S. Wickham; L.M. Smith, A. Penman, B. Smith, D. McLean; A. Anlezark; D. More; A. Burden, Lucas, A. Oxlade, W. Richards, E. O'Brien, W. Hirschburg, B. Swannell, C. Murwin

=== New Zealand ===
2 September 1905

New Zealand	14–3	Australia
Try: Cross, McMinn (2), Wrigley; Con: Francis	Report	Try: D.J. McLean

Tahuna Park, Dunedin
Attendance: 3,000
Referee: J. Williams

Team details

New Zealand	Australia

New Zealand: E. L. Watkins, E. H. Dodd, T. Cross, E. Purdue, J. C. Spencer (capt), A. R. H. Francis, C. A. Purdue, A. F. McMinn, G. F. Burgess, W. E. Smith, C. M. Gilray, E. Wrigley, R. Bennet, D. G. Macpherson, H. S. Turtill
Australia: A. Burdon, A. M. Oxlade, J. C. Clarken, H. A. Judd, E. W. Richards, W. Hirschberg, B. Lucas, B. I. Swannell, M. J. Dore, E. A. Anlezark, D. J. McLean, F. B. Smith, L. M. Smith, S. M. Wickham (capt), A. P. Penman

=== Manawatu / Hawke's Combined ===
6 September 1905

Manawatu / Hawke's Bay	5–7	Australia
	Report

?, Palmerston North
Attendance: 6,000

=== Taranaki / Wangaui ===
9 September 1905

Taranaki / Wanganui	13–18	Australia
	Report

?, Hawera

=== Auckland ===
16 September 1905

Auckland	8–10	Australia
	Report

Alexandra Park, Auckland

== Bibliography ==
- Evening Post, Monday 21 August 1905, pg. 5
- Nelson Evening Mail Thursday, 24 August 1905, pg. 2
- Press, Sunday 28 August 1905, pg. 8
- Evening Post, Sunday 4 September 1905, pg. 3
- Wanganui Chronicle, Wednesday 6 September 1905, pg. 5
- Evening Post, Monday 11 September 1905, pg. 5
- Wanganui Herald, Tuesday 19 September 1905, pg. 5
