= 1980 New Zealand rugby union tour of Australia and Fiji =

Summary
P	W	D	L
Total
16	12	1	3
Test match
4	2	0	2
Opponent
P	W	D	L
Australia
3	1	0	2
Fiji
1	1	0	0

The 1980 New Zealand tour rugby to Australia and Fiji was the 24th tour by the New Zealand national rugby union team to Australia and ended with three matches at Fiji.

The last tour of "All Blacks" in Australia was the short 1979 tour.

All Blacks won only one test match on three and lost the Bledisloe Cup.

== Schedule ==
Scores and results list New Zealand's points tally first.

Opposing Team	For	Against	Date	Venue	Status
Sydney	13	13	31 May 1980	Moore Park, Sydney	Tour match
South Australia	75	3	4 June 1980	Norwood Oval, Adelaide	Tour match
Victoria	45	6	7 June 1980	Olympic Stadium, Melbourne	Tour match
Tasmanian Invitation XV	73	0	11 June 1980	Queenborough Oval, Hobart	Tour match
New South Wales	12	4	14 June 1980	Moore Park, Sydney	Tour match
New South Wales Country	34	3	16 June 1980	Sports Ground, Newcastle	Tour match
Australia	9	13	21 June 1980	Cricket Ground, Sydney	Test match
Queensland Country	63	6	24 June 1980	Hugh Street Reserve, Townsville	Tour match
Australia	12	9	28 June 1980	Ballymore, Brisbane	Test match
Australian Universities	33	3	2 July 1980	Ballymore, Brisbane	Tour match
Queensland	3	9	6 July 1980	Ballymore, Brisbane	Tour match
A.C.T.	48	15	8 July 1980	Manuka Oval, Canberra	Tour match
Australia	10	26	12 July 1980	Cricket Ground, Sydney	Test match
Nadroga	14	6	16 July 1980	Churchill Park, Lautoka	Tour match
Suva	33	4	19 July 1980	National Stadium, Suva	Tour match
Fiji	30	6	23 July 1980	National Stadium, Suva	Tour match
