= 1962 New Zealand rugby union tour of Australia =

Summary
P	W	D	L
Total
10	9	0	1
Test match
2	2	0	0
Opponent
P	W	D	L
Australia
2	2	0	0

The 1962 New Zealand tour rugby to Australia was the 20th tour by the New Zealand national rugby union team to Australia.

The last tour of "All Blacks" in Australia was the 1957 tour, in 1960, New Zealand visit Australia on the way of their tour to South Africa

Australians visited New Zealand in 1958

All Backs won all both test matches. The Bledisloe Cup was assigned after the Australian tour in New Zealand late in the same year.

== The tour ==
Scores and results list All Blacks' points tally first.

Opposing Team	For	Against	Date	Venue	Status
Central-Western Districts	41	6	16 May 1962	Bathurst Ground, Bathurst	Tour match
New South Wales	11	12	19 May 1962	Sports Ground, Sydney	Tour match
Queensland	15	5	22 May 1962	Ekka Ground, Brisbane	Tour match
Australia	20	6	26 May 1962	Ekka Ground, Brisbane	Test match
Northern N.S.W.	103	0	30 May 1962	Quirindi Ground, Quirindi	Tour match
Newcastle	29	6	2 June 1962	Sportsground, Newcastle	Tour match
Australia	14	5	4 June 1962	Cricket Ground, Sydney	Test match
Southern N.S.W.	58	6	9 June 1962	, Canberra	Tour match
South Australia	77	0	13 June 1962	Norwood Oval, Adelaide	Tour match
Victoria	58	3	16 June 1962	Olympic Stadium, Melbourne	Tour match
