= 1931 Australia rugby union tour of New Zealand =

Summary
P	W	D	L
Total
8	2	1	5
Test match
1	0	0	1
Opponent
P	W	D	L
New Zealand
1	0	0	1

The 1931 Australia rugby union tour of New Zealand was a series of rugby union games undertaken by the Australia team in New Zealand against invitational and national teams of New Zealand.

The Queensland Rugby Union had collapsed in 1919 and would not be reborn until 1929 leaving the New South Wales Rugby Union to administer the game in Australia at the national representative level. In 1931 finally an "all-australian" team was refounded.

== Preliminary match ==
Scores and results list Australia's points tally first.

Opposing Team	For	Against	Date	Venue	Status
The Rest	38	29	3 August 1931	Sydney	Preliminary

== Tour match ==
Scores and results list Australia's points tally first.

Opposing Team	For	Against	Date	Venue	Status
Otago	3	3	22 August 1931	Carisbrook, Dunedin	Tour match
Southland	8	14	26 August 1931	Rugby Park, Invercargill	Tour match
Canterbury	13	16	29 August 1931	Lancaster Park, Christchurch	Tour match
Nelson / West Coast	5	14	2 September 1931	Trafalgar Park, Nelson	Tour match
Wellington	8	15	5 September 1931	Athletic Park, Wellington	Tour match
New Zealand Māori	14	3	9 September 1931	Showgrounds, Palmerston North	Test match
New Zealand	13	20	12 September 1931	Eden Park, Auckland	Test match
Hawke's Bay	27	11	16 September 1931	McLean Park, Napier	Tour match

== Sources ==
- Vivian Jenkins, ed. (1979). Rothmans Rugby Yearbook 1979–80. Rothmans Publications Ltd. ISBN 0-354-09087-9.
- The Brisbane Courier Tuesday 4 August 1931 p 6
- Morning Bulletin Monday 24 August 1931 p 10
- The Canberra Times Thursday 27 August 1931 p 1
- Townsville Daily Bulletin Monday 31 August 1931 p 9
- The Sydney Morning Herald Thursday 3 September 1931 p 14
- The Sydney Morning Herald Monday 7 September 1931 p 13
- The Sydney Morning Herald Thursday 10 September 1931 p 12
- Morning Bulletin Monday 14 September 1931 p 10
- The Sydney Morning Herald Thursday 17 September 1931 p 12
