= 1936 Australia rugby union tour of New Zealand =

Series of rugby union matches by the Australian national team

Summary
P	W	D	L
Total
10	2	8
Test match
3	1	0	2
Opponent
P	W	D	L
New Zealand
2	0	0	2
New Zealand Maoris
1	1	0	0

The 1936 Australia rugby union tour of New Zealand was a series of rugby union matches undertaken by the Australia team in New Zealand against invitational and national teams of New Zealand.

The most important matches were the two test matches against New Zealand - The "All Blacks" won both and regained the Bledisloe Cup lost during the 1934 tour in Australia

== Matches ==
Scores and results list Australia's points tally first.

Opposing Team	For	Against	Date	Venue	Status
Auckland	5	8	22 August 1936	Eden Park, Auckland	Tour match
Wanganui	22	12	26 August 1936	Cooks Gardens, Wanganui	Tour match
Hawke's Bay	14	20	29 August 1936	McLean Park, Napier	Tour match
Wairarapa	10	13	2 September 1936	Memorial Park, Masterton	Tour match
New Zealand	6	11	5 September 1936	Athletic Park, Wellington	Test match
North Otago	6	13	9 September 1936	Showgrounds, Oamaru	Tour match
New Zealand	13	38	12 September 1936	Carisbrook, Dunedin	Test match
Southland	6	14	16 September 1936	Rugby Park, Invercargill	Tour match
Canterbury	8	19	20 September 1936	Lancaster Park, Christchurch	Tour match
New Zealand Māori	31	6	23 September 1936	Showgrounds, Palmerston North	Test match

== Sources ==
- Vivian Jenkins, ed. (1979). Rothmans Rugby Yearbook 1979–80. Rothmans Publications Ltd. ISBN 0-354-09087-9.
