= 1951 New Zealand rugby union tour of Australia =

Summary
P	W	D	L
Total
12	12	0	0
Test match
3	3	0	0
Opponent
P	W	D	L
Australia
3	3	0	0

The 1951 New Zealand tour rugby to Australia was the 18th tour by the New Zealand national rugby union team to Australia.

The last tour of "All Blacks" in Australia was the 1947 tour, then in 1949 were the Australians to visit New Zealand.

All Blacks won all the three test matches and won the Bledisloe Cup, lost in 1949.

== The tour ==
Scores and results list All Blacks points tally first.

Opposing Team	For	Against	Date	Venue	Status
Newcastle	20	6	11 June 1951	Sports Ground, Newcastle	Tour match
New South Wales	24	3	16 June 1951	Moore Park, Sydney	Tour match
Australian United Services	15	6	20 June 1951	North Sydney Oval, Sydney	Tour match
Australia	8	0	23 June 1951	Cricket Ground, Sydney	Test match
Central-Western Districts	65	6	27 June 1951	Parkes	Tour match
An Australian XV	56	11	30 June 1951	Cricket Ground, Melbourne	Tour match
Combined XV	48	10	4 July 1951	Cricket Ground, Wagga Wagga	Tour match
Australia	17	11	7 July 1951	Cricket Ground, Sydney	Test match
New England	49	6	11 July 1951	Showground, Armidale	Tour match
Queensland	19	9	14 July 1951	Stadium, Toowoomba	Tour match
Brisbane	29	9	18 July 1951	The Gabba, Brisbane	Tour match
Australia	16	6	21 July 1951	The Gabba, Brisbane	Test match
