= 1988 New Zealand rugby union tour of Australia =

Summary
P	W	D	L
Total
13	12	1	0
Test match
3	2	1	0
Opponent
P	W	D	L
Australia
3	2	1	0

The 1988 New Zealand tour rugby to Australia and Fiji was the 26th tour by the New Zealand national rugby union team to Australia.

The last tour of the All Blacks in Australia was the 1984 tour, while Australia visited New Zealand in the 1986 tour.

All Blacks won two test match on three and won the Bledisloe Cup.

== The tour ==
Scores and results list New Zealand's points tally first.

Opposing team	For	Against	Date	Venue	Status
Western Australia	60	3	19 June 1988	Parry Lakes, Perth	Tour match
Randwick DRUFC	25	9	22 June 1988	Coogee Oval, Sydney	Tour match
Australia B	28	4	26 June 1988	Ballymore, Brisbane	Tour match
New South Wales Country	29	4	29 June 1988	Rugby Park, Singleton	Tour match
Australia	32	7	3 July 1988	Concord Oval, Sydney	Test match
A.C.T.	16	3	6 July 1988	Seiffert Oval, Queanbeyan	Tour match
Queensland	27	12	10 July 1988	Ballymore, Brisbane	Tour match
Queensland B	39	3	13 July 1988	Hugh Street, Townsville	Tour match
Australia	19	19	16 July 1988	Ballymore, Brisbane	Test match
New South Wales B	45	9	20 July 1988	Grahame Park, Gosford	Tour match
New South Wales	42	6	23 July 1988	Concord Oval, Sydney	Tour match
Victorian Invitation XV	84	8	26 July 1988	Olympic Park, Melbourne	Tour match
Australia	30	9	30 July 1988	Concord Oval, Sydney	Test match
