= 1979 New Zealand rugby union tour of Australia =

Summary
P	W	D	L
Total
2	1	0	1
Test match
1	0	0	1
Opponent
P	W	D	L
Australia
1	0	0	1

The 1979 New Zealand tour rugby to Australia was the 23rd tour by the New Zealand national rugby union team to Australia.

It was a short tour (only two matches), arranged between the French tour and the Argentinian tour in New Zealand.

The previous tour of All Blacks in Australia was the 1974 tour. Australia has visited New Zealand in 1978 .

Australia won the only test match played and the Bledisloe Cup, thereby ending a 28-year losing streak.

== The tour ==
{Scores and results list New Zealand's points tally first.

Opposing Team	For	Against	Date	Venue	Status
Queensland B	35	3	24 July 1979	Ballymore, Brisbane	Tour match
Australia	6	12	28 July 1979	Cricket Ground, Sydney	Test match
