= 1952 Australia rugby union tour of New Zealand =

Summary
P	W	D	L
Total
10	8	0	2
Test match
2	1	0	1
Opponent
P	W	D	L
New Zealand
2	1	0	1

The 1952 Australia rugby union tour of New Zealand was a series of 10 rugby union matches played by "Wallabies" in 1952.

The test series was won tied with a victory for Australia and one for New Zealand

== Matches ==
Scores and results list Australia's points tally first.

Opposing Team	For	Against	Date	Venue	Status
North Auckland	21	14	13 August 1952	Okara Park, Whangārei	Tour match
Auckland	17	16	16 August 1952	Eden Park, Auckland	Tour match
King Country	16	6	20 August 1952	Island Reserve, Ōtorohanga	Tour match
Taranaki	13	9	23 August 1952	Rugby Park, New Plymouth	Tour match
Manawatu	16	6	27 August 1952	Showgrounds, Palmerston North	Tour match
Otago	12	9	30 August 1952	Carisbrook, Dunedin	Tour match
Southland	9	24	3 September 1952	Rugby Park, Invercargill	Tour match
New Zealand	14	9	6 September 1952	Lancaster Park, Christchurch	Test match
Nelson	29	12	10 September 1952	Trafalgar Park, Nelson	Tour match
New Zealand	8	15	13 September 1952	Athletic Park, Wellington	Test match

== Bibliography ==
- Vivian Jenkins, ed. (1979). Rothmans Rugby Yearbook 1979–80. Rothmans Publications Ltd. ISBN 0-354-09087-9.
