= 1934 New Zealand rugby union tour of Australia =

Series of rugby union matches

Summary
P	W	D	L
Total
8	6	1	1
Test match
2	0	1	1
Opponent
P	W	D	L
Australia
2	0	1	1

The 1934 New Zealand rugby union tour of Australia was the 15th tour undertaken by the New Zealand national rugby union team to Australia. The All Blacks played a total of eight matches, including two test matches against Australia. They won six of the non-Test matches, drew one, and lost one. In the Test series, they drew one and lost one, meaning the Wallabies won the Bledisloe Cup series.

== Tour results ==
Scores and results list New Zealand's points first.

Opponent	NZ points	Opponent points	Date	Venue	Match type
Western Districts	51	10	1 August 1934	Wade Park, Orange	Tour match
New South Wales	18	16	4 August 1934	Sydney Cricket Ground	Tour match
New South Wales	16	13	6 August 1934	Moore Park, Sydney	Tour match
Australia	11	25	11 August 1934	Sydney Cricket Ground	Test match
Queensland	31	14	15 August 1934	Ekka Ground, Brisbane	Tour match
Australian XV	11	6	18 August 1934	Ekka Ground, Brisbane	Tour match
Newcastle	35	3	22 August 1934	Newcastle Sportsground	Tour match
Australia	3	3	25 August 1934	Sydney Cricket Ground	Test match draw

== Significance ==
Australia claimed their first Bledisloe Cup victory in 1934 by winning the Test series (1 win, 1 draw).

== See also ==
- History of rugby union matches between Australia and New Zealand
