= 1992 New Zealand rugby union tour of Australia and South Africa =

Summary
P	W	D	L
Total
16	13	0	3
Test match
4	2	0	2
Opponent
P	W	D	L
Australia
3	1	0	2
South Africa
1	1	0	0

The 1992 New Zealand tour rugby to Australia and South Africa was the 28th tour by the All Blacks to Australia, and their 6th tour to South Africa. It was first official visit by the New Zealand team to South Africa since the controversial tour of 1976.

The Wallabies defeated the All Blacks in the test series played in Australia by two tests to one, but the All Blacks went undefeated in South Africa including the one test match against the Springboks.

== In Australia ==
The All Blacks lost the Bledisloe Cup and won only one test match out of the three played against the Wallabies.

Playing for the South Australian Invitatation XV in Adelaide, Peter FitzSimons became the first Wallaby, past or present, to be sent off in a game against the All Blacks.

Scores and results list New Zealand's points tally first.

Opposing Team	For	Against	Date	Venue	Status
Western Australia	80	0	21 June 1992	WACA Ground, Perth	Tour match
South Austr.Invitat. XV	48	18	24 June 1992	Hindmarsh Stadium, Adelaide	Tour match
New South Wales	41	9	28 June 1992	Concord Oval, Sydney	Tour match
A.C.T.	45	13	0/7/1992	Manuka Oval, Canberra	Tour match
Australia	15	16	4 July 1992	Sydney Football Stadium, Sydney	Test match
Victorian Invitation XV	53	3	8 July 1992	Olympic Park, Melbourne	Tour match
Queensland	26	19	12 July 1992	Ballymore, Brisbane	Tour match
Queensland B	32	13	15 July 1992	Barlow Park, Cairns	Tour match
Australia	17	19	19 July 1992	Ballymore, Brisbane	Test match
Sydney	17	40	22 July 1992	Penrith Stadium, Sydney	Tour match
Australia	26	23	25 July 1992	Sydney Football Stadium, Sydney	Test match

== In South Africa ==
Scores and results list New Zealand's points tally first.

Opposing Team	For	Against	Date	Venue	Status
Natal	43	25	1 August 1992	Kings Park, Durban	Tour match
Orange Free State	33	14	5 August 1992	Free State Stadium, Bloemfontein	Tour match
Junior South Africa	25	10	8 August 1992	Loftus Versfeld, Pretoria	Tour match
Central Unions	39	6	10 August 1992	J.van Riebeeck, Witbank	Tour match
South Africa	27	24	15 August 1992	Ellis Park, Johannesburg	Test match
