= 1968 New Zealand rugby union tour of Australia and Fiji =

Summary
P	W	D	L
Total
12	12	0	0
Test match
3	3	0	0
Opponent
P	W	D	L
Australia
2	2	0	0
Fiji
1	1	0	0

The 1968 New Zealand tour rugby to Australia and Fiji was the 21st tour by the New Zealand national rugby union team to Australia, concluding with a match against Fiji in Suva, Fiji.

The previous tour by the All Blacks to Australia was the 1962 tour. The Wallabies had visited New Zealand in 1964.

The All Backs won all both Test matches and the Bledisloe Cup.

Before the first Test Australian coach (and former Wallaby and All Black) Des Connor had studied the rulebook and after consulting with referees, he introduced tactically the first short lineout ever used in a match in the southern hemisphere. This tactic is now a common part of rugby at all levels.

== Schedule ==
Scores and results list All Blacks's points tally first.

Opposing Team	For	Against	Date	Venue	Status
Sydney	14	9	21 May 1968	Moore Park, Sydney	Tour match
Tasmania	74	0	25 May 1968	Queenborough Oval, Hobart	Tour match
Junior Wallabies	43	3	28 May 1968	Norwood Oval, Adelaide	Tour match
Victoria	68	0	1 June 1968	Olympic Stadium, Melbourne	Tour match
A.C.T.	44	0	5 June 1968	Manuka Oval, Canberra	Tour match
New South Wales	30	5	8 June 1968	Moore Park, Sydney	Tour match
New South Wales Country	29	3	10 June 1968	Sports Ground, Newcastle	Tour match
Australia Comb. Serv	45	8	12 June 1968	North Sydney Oval, Sydney	Tour match
Australia	27	11	15 June 1968	Cricket Ground, Sydney	Test match
Queensland	34	3	18 June 1968	Ballymore, Brisbane	Tour match
Australia	19	18	22 June 1968	Ballymore, Brisbane	Test match
Fiji	33	6	25 June 1968	National Stadium, Suva	Tour match

== Published sources ==
- Howell, Max (2005) Born to Lead – Wallaby Test Captains, Celebrity Books, Auckland NZ
