= 1926 New Zealand rugby union tour of New South Wales =

Summary
| P | W | D | L |
Total
| 7 | 6 | 0 | 1 |
Opponent
| P | W | D | L |
New South Wales (Note: The four matches played by New South Wales were retroactively accorded Test status by the Australian Rugby Union in 1986, but remain as tour matches only for the NZRU)
| 4 | 3 | 0 | 1 |

The 1926 New Zealand tour rugby to New South Wales was the 13th tour by the New Zealand national rugby union team to Australia.

During the First World War the activity of Rugby Union was suspended. In Australia, the sport was initially reprised only in New South Wales (many players switched to Rugby league especially in Queensland), so official test matches between the two national sides were not resumed until 1929.

The four most important matches were played against the New South Wales selection, and New Zealand won the 4 match series 3–1. In 1986 the Australian Rugby Union accorded Test status to the New South Wales matches played against international teams in the 1920–1928 period, but the matches against the All Blacks are not recorded as Tests by the New Zealand Rugby Union.

== The matches ==
=== Preliminary matches ===
Scores and results list New Zealand's points tally first.

| Opposing team | For | Against | Date | Venue | Status |
|---|---|---|---|---|---|
| Wellington | 21 | 14 | 30 June 1926 | Athletic Park, Wellington | |

=== Tour matches ===
Scores and results list New Zealand's points tally first.

| Opposing team | For | Against | Date | Venue | Status |
|---|---|---|---|---|---|
| New South Wales | 20 | 26 | 10 July 1926 | (R.A.S.), Sydney | Tour match |
| Metropolitan and Country XV | 31 | 14 | 14 July 1926 | University Oval, Sydney | Tour match |
| New South Wales | 11 | 6 | 17 July 1926 | (R.A.S.), Sydney | Tour match |
| New South Wales | 14 | 0 | 20 July 1926 | (R.A.S.), Sydney | Tour match |
| Victoria | 58 | 15 | 24 July 1926 | Carlton VFL, Melbourne | Tour match |
| New South Wales | 28 | 21 | 29 July 1926 | (R.A.S.), Sydney | Tour match |

=== Post-tour match ===
Scores and results list New Zealand's points tally first.

| Opposing team | For | Against | Date | Venue | Status |
|---|---|---|---|---|---|
| Auckland | 11 | 6 | 4 August 1926 | Eden Park, Auckland | Tour match |

== Bibliography ==
All found on link

- The Brisbane Courier, Monday 15 June 1925 p 14
- The Advertiser (Adelaide) Thursday 18 June 1925 p 12
- The Sydney Morning Herald Monday 22 June 1925 p 8
- The Barrier Miner (Broken Hill, NSW) Wednesday 24 June 1925 p 3
- The Brisbane Courier Monday 29 June 1925 p 14
- The Sydney Morning Herald Thursday 2 July 1925 p 5
