= 1974 New Zealand rugby union tour of Australia and Fiji =

Summary
P	W	D	L
Total
13	12	1	0
Test match
4	3	1	0
Opponent
P	W	D	L
Australia
3	2	1	0
Fiji
1	1	0	0

The 1974 New Zealand tour rugby to Australia and Fiji was the 22nd tour by the New Zealand national rugby union team to Australia and ended with a match at Fiji.

The last tour of "All Blacks" in Australia was the 1968 tour.

Australians visited New Zealand in 1972.

All Backs won two test matches and the Bledisloe Cup. Another test was tied.

== Results ==
Scores and results list New Zealand's points tally first.

Opposing Team	For	Against	Date	Venue	Status
South Australia	117	6	1 May 1974	Norwood Oval, Adelaide	Tour Match
Western Australia	31	3	5 May 1974	Perry Lakes Stadium, Perth	Tour Match
Victoria	41	3	8 May 1974	Australian Rules Gr., Melbourne	Tour Match
Sydney XV	33	10	12 May 1974	Sports Ground, Sydney	Tour Match
N.S.W. Country	27	4	15 May 1974	Dubbo	Tour Match
New South Wales	20	0	18 May 1974	Cricket Ground, Sydney	Tour Match
A.C.T.	49	0	21 May 1974	Queanbeyan	Tour Match
Australia	11	6	25 May 1974	Cricket Ground, Sydney	Test Match
Queensland	42	6	28 May 1974	Ballymore Stadium, Brisbane	Tour Match
Australia	16	16	1 June 1974	Ballymore Stadium, Brisbane	Test Match
Queensland Country	29	0	3 June 1974	Gold Park, Toowoomba	Tour Match
Australia	16	6	8 June 1974	Cricket Ground, Sydney	Test Match
Fiji	14	13	11 June 1974	Buckhurst Park, Suva	Test Match
