= 1947 New Zealand rugby union tour of Australia =

Summary
P	W	D	L
Total
9	8	0	1
Test match
2	2	0	0
Opponent
P	W	D	L
Australia
2	2	0	0

The 1947 New Zealand tour rugby to Australia was the 17th tour by the New Zealand national rugby union team to Australia.

The last tour of "All Blacks" in Australia was the 1938 tour, then in 1946 were the Australians to visit New Zealand.

All Blacks won both the test matches and the Bledisloe Cup

== The tour ==
Scores and results list All Blacks points tally first.

Opposing Team	For	Against	Date	Venue	Status
A.C.T.	58	11	4 June 1947	Manuka Oval, Canberra	Tour match
New South Wales	9	12	7 June 1947	Cricket Ground, Sydney	Tour match
AN.S.W. XV	26	17	10 June 1947	Moore Park, Sydney	Tour match
Australia	13	5	14 June 1947	Ekka Ground, Brisbane	Test match
Queensland	23	14	16 June 1947	Ekka Ground, Brisbane	Tour match
Queensland	25	9	18 June 1947	Stadium, Toowoomba	Tour match
New South Wales	36	3	21 June 1947	Cricket Ground, Sydney	Tour match
Combined Northern Distr.	43	14	25 June 1947	Sports Ground, Newcastle	Tour match
Australia	27	14	28 June 1947	Cricket Ground, Sydney	Test match

== Post-tour match ==
Scores and results list All Blacks points tally first.

Opposing Team	For	Against	Date	Venue	Status
Auckland	3	14	2 July 1947	Eden Park, Auckland	
