= 1991 New Zealand rugby union tour of Australia =

Summary
P	W	D	L
Total
2	1	0	1
Test match
1	0	0	1
Opponent
P	W	D	L
Australia
1	0	0	1

The 1991 New Zealand rugby union tour of Australia was the 27th tour... by the New Zealand national rugby union team to Australia.

The tour consisted of two matches: a tour match against Australia B and one Test match against Australia. In 1991, the Bledisloe Cup was contested in a home-and-away format, with one Test held in each country.

New Zealand lost the Test match in Sydney. Later that month, during the 1991 Australia rugby union tour of New Zealand, they won the return Test match to retain the Bledisloe Cup.

== The tour ==
Scores and results list New Zealand's points tally first.

Opposing Team	For	Against	Date	Venue	Status	Ref.
Australia B	21	15	6 August 1991	Ballymore, Brisbane	Tour match	
Australia	12	21	10 August 1991	Football Stadium, Sydney	Test match	
