= 1922 New Zealand rugby union tour of New South Wales =

- Top point scorer: Mark Nicholls (54)
- Top try scorer: Jock Richardson (8)
Summary
P	W	D	L
Total
8	6	0	2
Test match
3	1	0	2
Opponent
P	W	D	L
(New South Wales) NSW Waratahs (Note: The three matches played by New South Wales were retroactively accorded Test status by the Australian Rugby Union in 1986, but remain as tour matches only for the NZRU.)
3	1	0	2

Tour chronology
- Previous tour: 1920 N.S. Wales
- Next tour: 1924 N.S. Wales

The 1922 New Zealand tour rugby to New South Wales was the tenth tour by the New Zealand national team to Australia.

During the First World War the activity of Rugby Union was suspended. In Australia, the sport was initially reprised only in New South Wales (many players switched to Rugby league especially in Queensland), so official test matches between the two national sides were not resumed until 1929.

The three most important matches were played against the New South Wales Selection, and NSW won the 3 match series 2–1. In 1986 the Australian Rugby Union accorded Test status to the New South Wales matches played against international teams in the 1920–1928 period, but the matches against the All Blacks are not recorded as Tests by the New Zealand Rugby Union.

Before and after the tour, New Zealand played some matches in their own country against provincial selections.

== Match summary ==
Complete list of matches played by the All Blacks in New South Wales:

Test matches

#	Date	Rival	City	Venue	Score
1	19 Jul	Wairarapa RU	Carterton	Carterton Domain	12–11
2	29 Jul	NSW Waratahs	Sydney	Showground	26–19
3	2 Aug	Metropolitan Union	Sydney	Showground	24–6
4	5 Aug	NSW Waratahs	Sydney	Showground	8–14
5	7 Aug	NSW Waratahs	Sydney	Showground	6–8
6	9 Aug	NSW 2nd	Sydney	Manly Oval	56–19
7	16 Aug	Manawatu / Wellington RU	Palmerston North	Showground	45–11
8	19 Aug	Māori All Blacks	Wellington	Athletic Park	21–14

Balance
Pl	W	D	L	Ps	Pc
8	6	0	2	198	102
