= 1932 New Zealand rugby union tour of Australia =

Australian Rugby tour

Summary
P	W	D	L
Total
10	9	0	1
Test match
3	2	0	1
Opponent
P	W	D	L
Australia
3	2	0	1

The 1932 New Zealand rugby union tour to Australia was the 14th tour by the New Zealand national rugby union team to Australia.

== The tour ==
Scores and results list New Zealand's points tally first.

Opposing Team	For	Against	Date	Venue	Status
New South Wales	13	11	25 June 1932	Cricket Ground, Sydney	Tour match
Newcastle	44	6	29 June 1932	Sports Ground, Newcastle	Tour match
Australia	17	22	2 July 1932	Cricket Ground, Sydney	Test match
New South Wales	27	3	6 July 1932	Cricket Ground, Sydney	Tour match
Queensland	28	8	9 July 1932	Ekka Ground, Brisbane	Tour match
Ipswich-Brisbane	44	12	14 July 1932	Showground, Ipswich	Tour match
Australia	21	3	16 July 1932	Ekka Ground, Brisbane	Test match
Toowoomba	30	6	20 July 1932	Stadium, Toowoomba	Tour match
Australia	21	13	23 July 1932	Cricket Ground, Sydney	Test match
Western Districts	63	15	27 July 1932	Bell Road Ground, Wellington	Tour match
