= 1955 Australia rugby union tour of New Zealand =

Summary
P	W	D	L
Test match
3	1	0	2
Opponent
P	W	D	L
New Zealand
3	1	0	2

The 1955 Australia rugby union tour of New Zealand was a series of rugby union matches played by "Wallabies" in 1955.

The test series was lost with a victory for Australia and two for New Zealand.

== Matches ==
Scores and results list Wallabies' points tally first.

Opposing Team	For	Against	Date	Venue	Status
Thames Valley / Bay of Plenty	14	9	7 August 1955	Boyd Park, Te Aroha	Tour match
Poverty Bay / East Coast	15	6	10 August 1955	Rugby Park, Gisborne	Tour match
Hawke's Bay	11	14	14 August 1955	McLean Park, Napier	Tour match
Wairarapa / Bush	22	17	17 August 1955	Bush Park, Pahiatua	Tour match
New Zealand	8	16	20 August 1955	Athletic Park, Wellington	Test match
Nelson / Marlborough / Golden Bay-Motueka	41	6	24 August 1955	Rugby Park, Motueka	Tour match
West Coast-Buller	13	3	27 August 1955	Rugby Park, Greymouth	Tour match
North Otago / Mid Canterbury / South Canterbury	19	3	31 August 1955	Centennial Park, Oamaru	Tour match
New Zealand	0	8	3 September 1955	Carisbrook, Dunedin	Test match
Southland	11	5	7 September 1955	Rugby Park, Invercargill	Tour match
Canterbury	19	8	10 September 1955	Lancaster Park, Christchurch	Tour match
Wanganui/ King Country	38	8	14 September 1955	Cooks Gardens, Wanganui	Tour match
New Zealand	8	3	17 September 1955	Eden Park, Auckland	Test match

== Bibliography ==
- Vivian Jenkins, ed. (1979). Rothmans Rugby Yearbook 1979–80. Rothmans Publications Ltd. ISBN 0-354-09087-9.
