= 1958 Australia rugby union tour of New Zealand =

Summary
P	W	D	L
Test match
3	1	0	2
Opponent
P	W	D	L
New Zealand
3	1	0	2

The 1958 Australia rugby union tour of New Zealand was a series of rugby union matches played by "Wallabies" in 1958.

The test series was lost with a victory for Australia and two for New Zealand

== Matches ==
Scores and results list Wallaibies' points tally first.

Opposing Team	For	Against	Date	Venue	Status
Hawke's Bay	6	8	9 August 1958	McLean Park, Napier	Tour match
Wanganui	11	9	13 August 1958	Cooks Gardens, Whanganui	Tour match
Taranaki	12	0	16 August 1958	Rugby Park, New Plymouth	Tour match
New Zealand	3	25	23 August 1958	Athletic Park, Wellington	Test match
Southland	8	26	27 August 1958	Rugby Park, Invercargill	Tour match
Otago	11	3	30 August 1958	Carisbrook, Dunedin	Tour match
South Canterbury	26	17	2 August 1958	Fraser Park, Timaru	Tour match
New Zealand	6	3	6 September 1958	Lancaster Park, Christchurch	Test match
Manawatu	6	12	10 September 1958	Showgrounds, Palmerston North	Tour match
Waikato	14	14	12 September 1958	Rugby Park, Hamilton	Tour match
North Auckland	8	9	16 September 1958	Okara Park, Whangārei	Tour match
New Zealand	8	17	20 September 1958	Alexandra Park, Auckland	Test match

== Bibliography ==
- Vivian Jenkins, ed. (1979). Rothmans Rugby Yearbook 1979–80. Rothmans Publications Ltd. ISBN 0-354-09087-9.
