= Nelson Rugby Union =

Defunct NZ rugby union club, based in Nelson

Nelson
Club information
- Full name: Nelson Rugby Union
- Colours: Navy blue and Sky blue
- Founded: 1885

Current details
- Ground: Trafalgar Park

Nelson Rugby Union was founded in New Zealand in 1885 and played provincial rugby till 1967 when it merged with the Golden Bay-Motueka Rugby Union to create Nelson-Bays.

== Nelson in Ranfurly Shield ==
In the history of the Nelson Rugby Union, Nelson has contested the Ranfurly Shield twice:

- 1924: vs Hawkes Bay 3-35, Hastings
- 1959: vs Taranaki 14–31, New Plymouth
