= List of Australia national rugby union team test match results =

A list of all international Test Matches played by the Wallabies.

== 1890s ==
Date	Opponent	F	A	Venue	City	Winner	Comments	Tour	Competition
1899-06-24	British & Irish Lions	13	3	SCG	(New South Wales) Sydney	Australia	Match Details	1899 British Lions tour	
1899-07-22	British & Irish Lions	0	11	Brisbane Exhibition Ground	(Queensland) Brisbane	British & Irish Lions	Match Details	1899 British Lions tour	
1899-08-05	British & Irish Lions	10	11	SCG	(New South Wales) Sydney	British & Irish Lions	Match Details	1899 British Lions tour	
1899-08-12	British & Irish Lions	0	13	SCG	(New South Wales) Sydney	British & Irish Lions	Match Details	1899 British Lions tour	

== 1900s ==
Date	Opponent	F	A	Venue	City	Winner	Comments	Tour	Competition
1903-08-15	New Zealand	3	22	SCG	(New South Wales) Sydney	New Zealand	Match Details	1903 New Zealand tour	
1904-07-02	British & Irish Lions	0	17	SCG	(New South Wales) Sydney	British & Irish Lions	Match Details	1904 British Lions tour	
1904-07-23	British & Irish Lions	3	17	Brisbane Exhibition Ground	(Queensland) Brisbane	British & Irish Lions	Match Details	1904 British Lions tour	
1904-07-30	British & Irish Lions	0	16	SCG	(New South Wales) Sydney	British & Irish Lions	Match Details	1904 British Lions tour	
1905-09-02	New Zealand	3	14	Tahuna Park	(New Zealand) Dunedin	New Zealand	Match Details	1905 Australia tour	
1907-07-20	New Zealand	6	26	SCG	(New South Wales) Sydney	New Zealand	Match Details	1907 New Zealand tour	
1907-08-03	New Zealand	5	14	The Gabba	(Queensland) Brisbane	New Zealand	Match Details	1907 New Zealand tour	
1907-08-10	New Zealand	5	5	SCG	(New South Wales) Sydney	Drawn	Match Details	1907 New Zealand tour	
1908-12-12	Wales	6	9	Cardiff Arms Park	(Wales) Cardiff	Wales	Match Details	1908–09 Australia tour	
1909-01-09	England	9	3	Rectory Field	(England) London	Australia	Match Details	1908–09 Australia tour	
1909-09-04	Australia Kangaroos	26	29	Agricultural Oval	(New South Wales) Sydney	Australia League		Kangaroos vs Wallabies test series	
1909-09-08	Australia Kangaroos	34	21	Agricultural Oval	(New South Wales) Sydney	Australia Union		Kangaroos vs Wallabies test series	
1909-09-11	Australia Kangaroos	15	6	Agricultural Oval	(New South Wales) Sydney	Australia Union		Kangaroos vs Wallabies test series	
1909-09-18	Australia Kangaroos	6	8	Agricultural Oval	(New South Wales) Sydney	Australia League		Kangaroos vs Wallabies test series	

== 1910s ==
Date	Opponent	F	A	Venue	City	Winner	Comments	Tour	Competition
1910-06-25	New Zealand	0	6	SCG	(New South Wales) Sydney	New Zealand	Match Details	1910 New Zealand tour	
1910-06-27	New Zealand	11	0	SCG	(New South Wales) Sydney	Australia	Match Details	1910 New Zealand tour	
1910-07-02	New Zealand	13	28	SCG	(New South Wales) Sydney	New Zealand	Match Details	1910 New Zealand tour	
1912-11-16	United States	12	8	California Field	(United States) Berkeley	Australia	Match Details	1912 Australia tour	
1913-09-06	New Zealand	5	30	Athletic Park	(New Zealand) Wellington	New Zealand	Match Details	1913 Australia tour	
1913-09-13	New Zealand	13	25	Carisbrook	(New Zealand) Dunedin	New Zealand	Match Details	1913 Australia tour	
1913-09-20	New Zealand	16	5	Lancaster Park	(New Zealand) Christchurch	Australia	Match Details	1913 Australia tour	
1914-07-18	New Zealand	0	5	Sydney Sports Ground	(New South Wales) Sydney	New Zealand	Match Details	1914 New Zealand tour	
1914-08-01	New Zealand	0	17	The Gabba	(Queensland) Brisbane	New Zealand	Match Details	1914 New Zealand tour	
1914-08-15	New Zealand	7	22	Sydney Sports Ground	(New South Wales) Sydney	New Zealand	Match Details	1914 New Zealand tour	

== 1920s ==
Date	Opponent	F	A	Venue	City	Winner	Comments	Tour	Competition
1920-07-24	New Zealand XV	15	26	Sydney Sports Ground	(New South Wales) Sydney	New Zealand XV	Match Details	1920 New Zealand tour (Note: Test caps not awarded by New Zealand)	
1920-07-31	New Zealand XV	6	14	Sydney Sports Ground	(New South Wales) Sydney	New Zealand XV	Match Details	1920 New Zealand tour	
1920-08-07	New Zealand XV	13	24	Sydney Sports Ground	(New South Wales) Sydney	New Zealand XV	Match Details	1920 New Zealand tour	
1921-06-25	South Africa XV	10	25	Sydney Showground	(New South Wales) Sydney	South Africa XV	Match Details	1921 South Africa tour (Note: Test caps not awarded by South Africa)	
1921-06-27	South Africa XV	11	16	Sydney Showground	(New South Wales) Sydney	South Africa XV	Match Details	1921 South Africa tour	
1921-07-02	South Africa XV	9	28	University Oval	(New South Wales) Sydney	South Africa XV	Match Details	1921 South Africa tour	
1921-09-03	New Zealand XV	17	0	Lancaster Park	(New Zealand) Christchurch	Australia	Match Details	1921 New South Wales tour	
1922-06-24	(New Zealand) NZ Māori	22	25	Sydney Showground	(New South Wales) Sydney	(New Zealand) NZ Māori	Match Details	1922 New Zealand Māori tour	
1922-06-26	(New Zealand) NZ Māori	28	13	Sydney Showground	(New South Wales) Sydney	Australia	Match Details	1922 New Zealand Māori tour	
1922-07-08	(New Zealand) NZ Māori	22	23	Sydney Showground	(New South Wales) Sydney	(New Zealand) NZ Māori	Match Details	1922 New Zealand Māori tour	
1922-07-29	New Zealand XV	19	26	Sydney Showground	(New South Wales) Sydney	New Zealand XV	Match Details	1922 New Zealand tour	
1922-08-05	New Zealand XV	14	8	Sydney Showground	(New South Wales) Sydney	Australia	Match Details	1922 New Zealand tour	
1922-08-07	New Zealand XV	8	6	Sydney Showground	(New South Wales) Sydney	Australia	Match Details	1922 New Zealand tour	
1923-06-16	(New Zealand) NZ Māori	27	23	Sydney Showground	(New South Wales) Sydney	Australia	Match Details	1923 New Zealand Māori tour	
1923-06-23	(New Zealand) NZ Māori	21	16	Sydney Showground	(New South Wales) Sydney	Australia	Match Details	1923 New Zealand Māori tour	
1923-06-25	(New Zealand) NZ Māori	14	12	Sydney Showground	(New South Wales) Sydney	Australia	Match Details	1923 New Zealand Māori tour	
1923-08-25	New Zealand XV	9	19	Carisbrook	(New Zealand) Dunedin	New Zealand XV	Match Details	1923 New South Wales tour	
1923-09-01	New Zealand XV	6	34	Lancaster Park	(New Zealand) Christchurch	New Zealand XV	Match Details	1923 New South Wales tour	
1923-09-15	New Zealand XV	11	38	Athletic Park	(New Zealand) Wellington	New Zealand XV	Match Details	1923 New South Wales tour	
1924-07-05	New Zealand XV	20	16	Sydney Showground	(New South Wales) Sydney	Australia	Match Details	1924 New Zealand tour	
1924-07-12	New Zealand XV	5	21	Sydney Showground	(New South Wales) Sydney	New Zealand XV	Match Details	1924 New Zealand tour	
1924-07-16	New Zealand XV	8	38	Sydney Showground	(New South Wales) Sydney	New Zealand XV	Match Details	1924 New Zealand tour	
1925-06-13	New Zealand XV	3	26	Sydney Showground	(New South Wales) Sydney	New Zealand XV	Match Details	1925 New Zealand tour	
1925-06-20	New Zealand XV	0	4	Sydney Showground	(New South Wales) Sydney	New Zealand XV	Match Details	1925 New Zealand tour	
1925-06-23	New Zealand XV	3	11	Sydney Showground	(New South Wales) Sydney	New Zealand XV	Match Details	1925 New Zealand tour	
1925-09-19	New Zealand XV	10	36	Eden Park	(New Zealand) Auckland	New Zealand XV	Match Details	1925 New South Wales tour	
1926-07-10	New Zealand XV	26	20	Sydney Showground	(New South Wales) Sydney	Australia	Match Details	1926 New Zealand tour	
1926-07-17	New Zealand XV	6	11	Sydney Showground	(New South Wales) Sydney	New Zealand XV	Match Details	1926 New Zealand tour	
1926-07-20	New Zealand XV	0	14	Sydney Showground	(New South Wales) Sydney	New Zealand XV	Match Details	1926 New Zealand tour	
1926-07-29	New Zealand XV	21	28	Sydney Showground	(New South Wales) Sydney	New Zealand XV	Match Details	1926 New Zealand tour	
1927-11-12	Ireland	5	3	Lansdowne Road	(Ireland) Dublin	Australia	Match Details	1927–28 New South Wales tour	Grand Slam
1927-11-26	Wales	18	8	Cardiff Arms Park	(Wales) Cardiff	Australia	Match Details	1927–28 New South Wales tour	Grand Slam
1927-12-17	Scotland	8	10	Murrayfield	(Scotland) Edinburgh	Scotland	Match Details	1927–28 New South Wales tour	Grand Slam
1928-01-07	England	11	18	Twickenham	(England) London	England	Match Details	1927–28 New South Wales tour	Grand Slam
1928-01-22	France	11	8	Stade Colombes	(France) Paris	Australia	Match Details	1927–28 New South Wales tour	Grand Slam
1928-09-05	New Zealand XV	12	15	Athletic Park	(New Zealand) Wellington	New Zealand XV	Match Details	1928 New South Wales tour	
1928-09-08	New Zealand XV	14	16	Carisbrook	(New Zealand) Dunedin	New Zealand XV	Match Details	1928 New South Wales tour	
1928-09-15	New Zealand XV	11	8	Lancaster Park	(New Zealand) Christchurch	Australia	Match Details	1928 New South Wales tour	
1928-09-22	(New Zealand) NZ Māori	8	9	Athletic Park	(New Zealand) Wellington	(New Zealand) NZ Māori	Match Details	1928 New South Wales tour	
1929-07-06	New Zealand	9	8	SCG	(New South Wales) Sydney	Australia	Match Details	1929 New Zealand tour	
1929-07-20	New Zealand	17	9	Brisbane Exhibition Ground	(Queensland) Brisbane	Australia	Match Details	1929 New Zealand tour	
1929-07-27	New Zealand	15	13	SCG	(New South Wales) Sydney	Australia	Match Details	1929 New Zealand tour	

== 1930s ==
Date	Opponent	F	A	Venue	City	Winner	Comments	Tour	Competition
1930-08-30	British & Irish Lions	6	5	SCG	(New South Wales) Sydney	Australia	Match Details	1930 British Lions tour	
1931-09-09	(New Zealand) NZ Māori	14	3	Showgrounds Oval	(New Zealand) Palmerston North	Australia	Match Details	1931 Australia tour	
1931-09-12	New Zealand	13	20	Eden Park	(New Zealand) Auckland	New Zealand	Match Details	1931 Australia tour	
1932-07-02	New Zealand	22	17	SCG	(New South Wales) Sydney	Australia	Match Details	1932 New Zealand tour	Bledisloe Cup
1932-07-16	New Zealand	3	21	Brisbane Exhibition Ground	(Queensland) Brisbane	New Zealand	Match Details	1932 New Zealand tour	Bledisloe Cup
1932-07-23	New Zealand	13	21	SCG	(New South Wales) Sydney	New Zealand	Match Details	1932 New Zealand tour	Bledisloe Cup
1933-07-08	South Africa	3	17	Newlands	(South Africa) Cape Town	South Africa	Match Details	1933 Australia tour	
1933-07-22	South Africa	21	6	Kingsmead	(South Africa) Durban	Australia	Match Details	1933 Australia tour	
1933-08-12	South Africa	3	12	Ellis Park	(South Africa) Johannesburg	South Africa	Match Details	1933 Australia tour	
1933-08-26	South Africa	0	11	Crusaders Ground	(South Africa) Port Elizabeth	South Africa	Match Details	1933 Australia tour	
1933-09-02	South Africa	15	4	Springbok Park	(South Africa) Bloemfontein	Australia	Match Details	1933 Australia tour	
1934-08-11	New Zealand	25	11	SCG	(New South Wales) Sydney	Australia	Match Details	1934 New Zealand tour	Bledisloe Cup (1st)
1934-08-25	New Zealand	3	3	SCG	(New South Wales) Sydney	Drawn	Match Details	1934 New Zealand tour	Bledisloe Cup (1st)
1936-09-05	New Zealand	6	11	Athletic Park	(New Zealand) Wellington	New Zealand	Match Details	1936 Australia tour	Bledisloe Cup
1936-09-12	New Zealand	13	38	Carisbrook	(New Zealand) Dunedin	New Zealand	Match Details	1936 Australia tour	Bledisloe Cup
1936-09-23	(New Zealand) NZ Māori	31	6	Showgrounds Oval	(New Zealand) Palmerston North	Australia	Match Details	1936 Australia tour	
1937-06-26	South Africa	5	9	SCG	(New South Wales) Sydney	South Africa	Match Details	1937 South Africa tour	
1937-07-17	South Africa	17	26	SCG	(New South Wales) Sydney	South Africa	Match Details	1937 South Africa tour	
1938-07-23	New Zealand	9	24	SCG	(New South Wales) Sydney	New Zealand	Match Details	1938 New Zealand tour	Bledisloe Cup
1938-08-06	New Zealand	14	20	Brisbane Exhibition Ground	(Queensland) Brisbane	New Zealand	Match Details	1938 New Zealand tour	Bledisloe Cup
1938-08-13	New Zealand	6	14	SCG	(New South Wales) Sydney	New Zealand	Match Details	1938 New Zealand tour	Bledisloe Cup

== 1940s ==
Date	Opponent	F	A	Venue	City	Winner	Comments	Tour	Competition
1946-09-14	New Zealand	8	31	Carisbrook	(New Zealand) Dunedin	New Zealand	Match Details	1946 Australia tour	Bledisloe Cup
1946-09-25	(New Zealand) NZ Māori	0	20	Rugby Park	(New Zealand) Hamilton	(New Zealand) NZ Māori	Match Details	1946 Australia tour	
1946-09-28	New Zealand	10	14	Eden Park	(New Zealand) Auckland	New Zealand	Match Details	1946 Australia tour	Bledisloe Cup
1947-06-14	New Zealand	5	13	Brisbane Exhibition Ground	(Queensland) Brisbane	New Zealand	Match Details	1947 New Zealand tour	Bledisloe Cup
1947-06-28	New Zealand	14	27	SCG	(New South Wales) Sydney	New Zealand	Match Details	1947 New Zealand tour	Bledisloe Cup
1947-11-22	Scotland	16	7	Murrayfield	(Scotland) Edinburgh	Australia	Match Details	1947–48 Australia tour	Grand Slam
1947-12-06	Ireland	16	3	Lansdowne Road	(Ireland) Dublin	Australia	Match Details	1947–48 Australia tour	Grand Slam
1947-12-20	Wales	0	6	Cardiff Arms Park	(Wales) Cardiff	Wales	Match Details	1947–48 Australia tour	Grand Slam
1948-01-03	England	11	0	Twickenham	(England) London	Australia	Match Details	1947–48 Australia tour	Grand Slam
1948-01-11	France	6	13	Stade Colombes	(France) Paris	France	Match Details	1947–48 Australia tour	Grand Slam
1949-06-04	(New Zealand) NZ Māori	3	12	SCG	(New South Wales) Sydney	(New Zealand) NZ Māori	Match Details	1949 New Zealand Māori tour	
1949-06-11	(New Zealand) NZ Māori	8	8	Brisbane Exhibition Ground	(Queensland) Brisbane	Drawn	Match Details	1949 New Zealand Māori tour	
1949-06-25	(New Zealand) NZ Māori	18	3	SCG	(New South Wales) Sydney	Australia	Match Details	1949 New Zealand Māori tour	
1949-09-03	New Zealand	11	6	Athletic Park	(New Zealand) Wellington	Australia	Match Details	1949 Australia tour	Bledisloe Cup (2nd)
1949-09-24	New Zealand	16	9	Eden Park	(New Zealand) Auckland	Australia	Match Details	1949 Australia tour	Bledisloe Cup (2nd)

== 1950s ==
Date	Opponent	F	A	Venue	City	Winner	Comments	Tour	Competition
1950-08-19	British & Irish Lions	6	19	The Gabba	(Queensland) Brisbane	British & Irish Lions	Match Details	1950 British Lions tour	
1950-08-26	British & Irish Lions	3	24	SCG	(New South Wales) Sydney	British & Irish Lions	Match Details	1950 British Lions tour	
1951-06-23	New Zealand	0	8	SCG	(New South Wales) Sydney	New Zealand	Match Details	1951 New Zealand tour	Bledisloe Cup
1951-07-07	New Zealand	11	17	SCG	(New South Wales) Sydney	New Zealand	Match Details	1951 New Zealand tour	Bledisloe Cup
1951-07-21	New Zealand	6	16	The Gabba	(Queensland) Brisbane	New Zealand	Match Details	1951 New Zealand tour	Bledisloe Cup
1952-07-26	Fiji	15	9	SCG	(New South Wales) Sydney	Australia	Match Details	1952 Fiji tour	
1952-08-09	Fiji	15	17	SCG	(New South Wales) Sydney	Fiji (Note: Loss to non-Tier 1 Nation.)	Match Details	1952 Fiji tour	
1952-09-06	New Zealand	14	9	Lancaster Park	(New Zealand) Christchurch	Australia	Match Details	1952 Australia tour	Bledisloe Cup
1952-09-13	New Zealand	8	15	Athletic Park	(New Zealand) Wellington	New Zealand	Match Details	1952 Australia tour	Bledisloe Cup
1953-08-22	South Africa	3	25	Ellis Park	(South Africa) Johannesburg	South Africa	Match Details	1953 Australia tour	
1953-09-05	South Africa	18	14	Newlands	(South Africa) Cape Town	Australia	Match Details	1953 Australia tour	
1953-09-19	South Africa	8	18	Kingsmead	(South Africa) Durban	South Africa	Match Details	1953 Australia tour	
1953-09-26	South Africa	9	22	Crusaders Ground	(South Africa) Port Elizabeth	South Africa	Match Details	1953 Australia tour	
1954-06-05	Fiji	22	19	Brisbane Exhibition Ground	(Queensland) Brisbane	Australia	Match Details	1954 Fiji tour	
1954-06-26	Fiji	16	18	SCG	(New South Wales) Sydney	Fiji	Match Details	1954 Fiji tour	
1955-08-20	New Zealand	8	16	Athletic Park	(New Zealand) Wellington	New Zealand	Match Details	1955 Australia tour	Bledisloe Cup
1955-09-03	New Zealand	0	8	Carisbrook	(New Zealand) Dunedin	New Zealand	Match Details	1955 Australia tour	Bledisloe Cup
1955-09-17	New Zealand	8	3	Eden Park	(New Zealand) Auckland	Australia	Match Details	1955 Australia tour	Bledisloe Cup
1956-05-26	South Africa	0	9	SCG	(New South Wales) Sydney	South Africa	Match Details	1956 South Africa tour	
1956-06-02	South Africa	0	9	Brisbane Exhibition Ground	(Queensland) Brisbane	South Africa	Match Details	1956 South Africa tour	
1957-05-25	New Zealand	11	25	SCG	(New South Wales) Sydney	New Zealand	Match Details	1957 New Zealand tour	Bledisloe Cup
1957-06-01	New Zealand	9	22	Brisbane Exhibition Ground	(Queensland) Brisbane	New Zealand	Match Details	1957 New Zealand tour	Bledisloe Cup
1958-01-04	Wales	3	9	Cardiff Arms Park	(Wales) Cardiff	Wales	Match Details	1957–58 Australia tour	Grand Slam
1958-01-18	Ireland	6	9	Lansdowne Road	(Ireland) Dublin	Ireland	Match Details	1957–58 Australia tour	Grand Slam
1958-02-01	England	6	9	Twickenham	(England) London	England	Match Details	1957–58 Australia tour	Grand Slam
1958-02-15	Scotland	8	12	Murrayfield	(Scotland) Edinburgh	Scotland	Match Details	1957–58 Australia tour	Grand Slam
1958-03-09	France	0	19	Stade Colombes	(France) Paris	France	Match Details	1957–58 Australia tour	Grand Slam
1958-06-14	(New Zealand) NZ Māori	15	14	Brisbane Exhibition Ground	(Queensland) Brisbane	Australia	Match Details	1958 New Zealand Māori tour	
1958-06-28	(New Zealand) NZ Māori	3	3	SCG	(New South Wales) Sydney	Drawn	Match Details	1958 New Zealand Māori tour	
1958-07-05	(New Zealand) NZ Māori	6	13	Olympic Park Stadium	(Victoria (state)) Melbourne	(New Zealand) NZ Māori	Match Details	1958 New Zealand Māori tour	
1958-08-23	New Zealand	3	25	Athletic Park	(New Zealand) Wellington	New Zealand	Match Details	1958 Australia tour	Bledisloe Cup
1958-09-06	New Zealand	6	3	Lancaster Park	(New Zealand) Christchurch	Australia	Match Details	1958 Australia tour	Bledisloe Cup
1958-09-20	New Zealand	8	17	Epsom Showgrounds	(New Zealand) Auckland	New Zealand	Match Details	1958 Australia tour	Bledisloe Cup
1959-06-06	British & Irish Lions	6	17	Brisbane Exhibition Ground	(Queensland) Brisbane	British & Irish Lions	Match Details	1959 British Lions tour	
1959-06-13	British & Irish Lions	3	24	Sydney Sports Ground	(New South Wales) Sydney	British & Irish Lions	Match Details	1959 British Lions tour	

== 1960s ==
Date	Opponent	F	A	Venue	City	Winner	Comments	Tour	Competition
1961-06-10	Fiji	24	6	Brisbane Exhibition Ground	(Queensland) Brisbane	Australia	Match Details	1961 Fiji tour	
1961-06-17	Fiji	20	14	SCG	(New South Wales) Sydney	Australia	Match Details	1961 Fiji tour	
1961-07-01	Fiji	3	3	Olympic Park Stadium	(Victoria (state)) Melbourne	Drawn	Match Details	1961 Fiji tour	
1961-08-05	South Africa	3	28	Ellis Park	(South Africa) Johannesburg	South Africa	Match Details	1961 Australia tour	
1961-08-12	South Africa	11	23	Boet Erasmus Stadium	(South Africa) Port Elizabeth	South Africa	Match Details	1961 Australia tour	
1961-08-26	France	8	15	SCG	(New South Wales) Sydney	France	Match Details	1961 France tour	
1962-05-26	New Zealand	6	20	Brisbane Exhibition Ground	(Queensland) Brisbane	New Zealand	Match Details	1962 New Zealand tour	Bledisloe Cup
1962-06-04	New Zealand	5	14	SCG	(New South Wales) Sydney	New Zealand	Match Details	1962 New Zealand tour	Bledisloe Cup
1962-08-25	New Zealand	9	9	Athletic Park	(New Zealand) Wellington	Drawn	Match Details	1962 Australia tour	Bledisloe Cup
1962-09-08	New Zealand	0	3	Carisbrook	(New Zealand) Dunedin	New Zealand	Match Details	1962 Australia tour	Bledisloe Cup
1962-09-22	New Zealand	8	16	Eden Park	(New Zealand) Auckland	New Zealand	Match Details	1962 Australia tour	Bledisloe Cup
1963-06-04	England	18	9	Sydney Sports Ground	(New South Wales) Sydney	Australia	Match Details	1963 England tour	
1963-07-13	South Africa	3	14	Loftus Versfeld	(South Africa) Pretoria	South Africa	Match Details	1963 Australia tour	
1963-08-10	South Africa	9	5	Newlands	(South Africa) Cape Town	Australia	Match Details	1963 Australia tour	
1963-08-24	South Africa	11	9	Ellis Park	(South Africa) Johannesburg	Australia	Match Details	1963 Australia tour	
1963-09-07	South Africa	6	22	Boet Erasmus Stadium	(South Africa) Port Elizabeth	South Africa	Match Details	1963 Australia tour	
1964-08-15	New Zealand	9	14	Carisbrook	(New Zealand) Dunedin	New Zealand	Match Details	1964 Australia tour	Bledisloe Cup
1964-08-22	New Zealand	3	18	Lancaster Park	(New Zealand) Christchurch	New Zealand	Match Details	1964 Australia tour	Bledisloe Cup
1964-08-29	New Zealand	20	5	Athletic Park	(New Zealand) Wellington	Australia	Match Details	1964 Australia tour	Bledisloe Cup
1965-06-19	South Africa	18	11	SCG	(New South Wales) Sydney	Australia	Match Details	1965 South Africa tour	
1965-06-26	South Africa	12	8	Lang Park	(Queensland) Brisbane	Australia	Match Details	1965 South Africa tour	
1966-05-28	British & Irish Lions	8	11	SCG	(New South Wales) Sydney	British & Irish Lions	Match Details	1966 British Lions tour	
1966-06-04	British & Irish Lions	0	31	Lang Park	(Queensland) Brisbane	British & Irish Lions	Match Details	1966 British Lions tour	
1966-12-03	Wales	14	11	Cardiff Arms Park	(Wales) Cardiff	Australia	Match Details	1966–67 Australia tour	Grand Slam
1966-12-17	Scotland	5	11	Murrayfield	(Scotland) Edinburgh	Scotland	Match Details	1966–67 Australia tour	Grand Slam
1967-01-07	England	23	11	Twickenham	(England) London	Australia	Match Details	1966–67 Australia tour	Grand Slam
1967-01-21	Ireland	8	15	Lansdowne Road	(Ireland) Dublin	Ireland	Match Details	1966–67 Australia tour	Grand Slam
1967-02-11	France	14	20	Stade Colombes	(France) Paris	France	Match Details	1966–67 Australia tour	Grand Slam
1967-05-13	Ireland	5	11	SCG	(New South Wales) Sydney	Ireland	Match Details	1967 Ireland tour	
1967-08-19	New Zealand	9	29	Athletic Park	(New Zealand) Wellington	New Zealand	Match Details	1967 Australia tour	Bledisloe Cup
1968-06-15	New Zealand	11	27	SCG	(New South Wales) Sydney	New Zealand	Match Details	1968 New Zealand tour	Bledisloe Cup
1968-06-22	New Zealand	18	19	Ballymore	(Queensland) Brisbane	New Zealand	Match Details	1968 New Zealand tour	Bledisloe Cup
1968-08-17	France	11	10	SCG	(New South Wales) Sydney	Australia	Match Details	1968 France tour	
1968-10-26	Ireland	3	10	Lansdowne Road	(Ireland) Dublin	Ireland	Match Details	1968 Australia tour	
1968-11-02	Scotland	3	9	Murrayfield	(Scotland) Edinburgh	Scotland	Match Details	1968 Australia tour	
1969-06-21	Wales	16	19	SCG	(New South Wales) Sydney	Wales	Match Details	1969 Wales tour	
1969-08-02	South Africa	11	30	Ellis Park	(South Africa) Johannesburg	South Africa	Match Details	1969 Australia tour	
1969-08-16	South Africa	9	16	Kings Park Stadium	(South Africa) Durban	South Africa	Match Details	1969 Australia tour	
1969-09-06	South Africa	3	11	Newlands	(South Africa) Cape Town	South Africa	Match Details	1969 Australia tour	
1969-09-20	South Africa	8	19	Free State Stadium	(South Africa) Bloemfontein	South Africa	Match Details	1969 Australia tour	

== 1970s ==
Date	Opponent	F	A	Venue	City	Winner	Comments	Tour	Competition
1970-06-06	Scotland	23	3	SCG	(New South Wales) Sydney	Australia	Match Details	1970 Scotland tour	
1971-07-17	South Africa	11	19	SCG	(New South Wales) Sydney	South Africa	Match Details	1971 South Africa tour	
1971-07-31	South Africa	6	14	Brisbane Exhibition Ground	(Queensland) Brisbane	South Africa	Match Details	1971 South Africa tour	
1971-08-07	South Africa	6	18	SCG	(New South Wales) Sydney	South Africa	Match Details	1971 South Africa tour	
1971-11-20	France	13	11	Stadium Municipal	(France) Toulouse	Australia	Match Details	1971 Australia tour	
1971-11-27	France	9	18	Stade Colombes	(France) Paris	France	Match Details	1971 Australia tour	
1972-06-17	France	14	14	SCG	(New South Wales) Sydney	Drawn	Match Details	1972 France tour	
1972-06-25	France	15	16	Ballymore	(Queensland) Brisbane	France	Match Details	1972 France tour	
1972-08-19	New Zealand	6	29	Athletic Park	(New Zealand) Wellington	New Zealand	Match Details	1972 Australia tour	Bledisloe Cup
1972-09-02	New Zealand	17	30	Lancaster Park	(New Zealand) Christchurch	New Zealand	Match Details	1972 Australia tour	Bledisloe Cup
1972-09-16	New Zealand	3	38	Eden Park	(New Zealand) Auckland	New Zealand	Match Details	1972 Australia tour	Bledisloe Cup
1972-09-19	Fiji	21	19	Buckhurst Park	(Fiji) Suva	Australia	Match Details	1972 Australia tour	
1973-06-23	Tonga	30	12	SCG	(New South Wales) Sydney	Australia	Match Details	1973 Tonga tour	
1973-06-30	Tonga	11	16	Ballymore	(Queensland) Brisbane	Tonga	Match Details	1973 Tonga tour	
1973-11-10	Wales	0	24	Cardiff Arms Park	(Wales) Cardiff	Wales	Match Details	1973 Australia tour	
1973-11-17	England	3	20	Twickenham	(England) London	England	Match Details	1973 Australia tour	
1974-05-25	New Zealand	6	11	SCG	(New South Wales) Sydney	New Zealand	Match Details	1974 New Zealand tour	Bledisloe Cup
1974-06-01	New Zealand	16	16	Ballymore	(Queensland) Brisbane	Drawn	Match Details	1974 New Zealand tour	Bledisloe Cup
1974-06-08	New Zealand	6	16	SCG	(New South Wales) Sydney	New Zealand	Match Details	1974 New Zealand tour	Bledisloe Cup
1975-05-24	England	16	9	SCG	(New South Wales) Sydney	Australia	Match Details	1975 England tour	
1975-05-31	England	30	21	Ballymore	(Queensland) Brisbane	Australia	Match Details	1975 England tour	
1975-08-02	Japan	37	7	SCG	(New South Wales) Sydney	Australia	Match Details	1975 Japan tour	
1975-08-17	Japan	50	25	Ballymore	(Queensland) Brisbane	Australia	Match Details	1975 Japan tour	
1975-12-06	Scotland	3	10	Murrayfield	(Scotland) Edinburgh	Scotland	Match Details	1975–76 Australia tour	Grand Slam
1975-12-20	Wales	3	28	Cardiff Arms Park	(Wales) Cardiff	Wales	Match Details	1975–76 Australia tour	Grand Slam
1976-01-03	England	6	23	Twickenham	(England) London	England	Match Details	1975–76 Australia tour	Grand Slam
1976-01-17	Ireland	20	10	Lansdowne Road	(Ireland) Dublin	Australia	Match Details	1975–76 Australia tour	Grand Slam
1976-01-31	United States	24	12	Glover Field	(United States) Anaheim	Australia	Match Details	1975–76 Australia tour	
1976-06-12	Fiji	22	6	SCG	(New South Wales) Sydney	Australia	Match Details	1976 Fiji tour	
1976-06-19	Fiji	21	9	Ballymore	(Queensland) Brisbane	Australia	Match Details	1976 Fiji tour	
1976-06-26	Fiji	27	17	SCG	(New South Wales) Sydney	Australia	Match Details	1976 Fiji tour	
1976-10-24	France	15	18	Stade Chaban-Delmas	(France) Bordeaux	France	Match Details	1976 Australia tour	
1976-10-30	France	6	34	Parc des Princes	(France) Paris	France	Match Details	1976 Australia tour	
1978-06-11	Wales	18	8	Ballymore	(Queensland) Brisbane	Australia	Match Details	1978 Wales tour	
1978-06-17	Wales	19	17	SCG	(New South Wales) Sydney	Australia	Match Details	1978 Wales tour	
1978-08-19	New Zealand	12	13	Athletic Park	(New Zealand) Wellington	New Zealand	Match Details	1978 Australia tour	Bledisloe Cup
1978-08-26	New Zealand	6	22	Lancaster Park	(New Zealand) Christchurch	New Zealand	Match Details	1978 Australia tour	Bledisloe Cup
1978-09-09	New Zealand	30	16	Eden Park	(New Zealand) Auckland	Australia	Match Details	1978 Australia tour	Bledisloe Cup
1979-06-03	Ireland	12	27	Ballymore	(Queensland) Brisbane	Ireland	Match Details	1979 Ireland tour	
1979-06-16	Ireland	3	9	SCG	(New South Wales) Sydney	Ireland	Match Details	1979 Ireland tour	
1979-07-28	New Zealand	12	6	SCG	(New South Wales) Sydney	Australia	Match Details	1979 New Zealand tour	Bledisloe Cup (3rd)
1979-10-27	Argentina	13	24	Estadio Arquitecto Ricardo Etcheverri	(Argentina) Buenos Aires	Argentina	Match Details	1979 Australia tour	
1979-11-03	Argentina	17	12	Estadio Arquitecto Ricardo Etcheverri	(Argentina) Buenos Aires	Australia	Match Details	1979 Australia tour	

== 1980s ==
Date	Opponent	F	A	Venue	City	Winner	Comments	Tour	Competition
1980-05-24	Fiji	22	9	National Stadium	(Fiji) Suva	Australia	Match Details	1980 Australia tour	
1980-06-21	New Zealand	13	9	SCG	(New South Wales) Sydney	Australia	Match Details	1980 New Zealand tour	Bledisloe Cup (4th)
1980-06-28	New Zealand	9	12	Ballymore	(Queensland) Brisbane	New Zealand	Match Details	1980 New Zealand tour	Bledisloe Cup (4th)
1980-07-12	New Zealand	26	10	SCG	(New South Wales) Sydney	Australia	Match Details	1980 New Zealand tour	Bledisloe Cup (4th)
1981-07-05	France	17	15	Ballymore	(Queensland) Brisbane	Australia	Match Details	1981 France tour	
1981-07-11	France	24	14	SCG	(New South Wales) Sydney	Australia	Match Details	1981 France tour	
1981-11-21	Ireland	16	12	Lansdowne Road	(Ireland) Dublin	Australia	Match Details	1981–82 Australia tour	Grand Slam
1981-12-05	Wales	13	18	Cardiff Arms Park	(Wales) Cardiff	Wales	Match Details	1981–82 Australia tour	Grand Slam
1981-12-19	Scotland	15	24	Murrayfield	(Scotland) Edinburgh	Scotland	Match Details	1981–82 Australia tour	Grand Slam
1982-01-02	England	11	15	Twickenham	(England) London	England	Match Details	1981–82 Australia tour	Grand Slam
1982-07-04	Scotland	7	12	Ballymore	(Queensland) Brisbane	Scotland	Match Details	1982 Scotland tour	
1982-07-10	Scotland	33	9	SCG	(New South Wales) Sydney	Australia	Match Details	1982 Scotland tour	
1982-08-14	New Zealand	16	23	Lancaster Park	(New Zealand) Christchurch	New Zealand	Match Details	1982 Australia tour	Bledisloe Cup
1982-08-28	New Zealand	19	16	Athletic Park	(New Zealand) Wellington	Australia	Match Details	1982 Australia tour	Bledisloe Cup
1982-09-11	New Zealand	18	33	Eden Park	(New Zealand) Auckland	New Zealand	Match Details	1982 Australia tour	Bledisloe Cup
1983-07-09	United States	49	3	SCG	(New South Wales) Sydney	Australia	Match Details	1983 United States tour	
1983-07-31	Argentina	3	18	Ballymore	(Queensland) Brisbane	Argentina	Match Details	1983 Argentina tour	
1983-08-07	Argentina	29	13	SCG	(New South Wales) Sydney	Australia	Match Details	1983 Argentina tour	
1983-08-20	New Zealand	8	18	SCG	(New South Wales) Sydney	New Zealand	Match Details	1983 New Zealand tour	Bledisloe Cup
1983-10-22	Italy	29	7	Stadio Comunale Mario Battaglini	(Italy) Rovigo	Australia	Match Details	1983 Australia tour	
1983-11-13	France	15	15	Stade Marcel-Michelin	(France) Clermont-Ferrand	Drawn	Match Details	1983 Australia tour	
1983-11-19	France	6	15	Parc des Princes	(France) Paris	France	Match Details	1983 Australia tour	
1984-06-09	Fiji	16	3	National Stadium	(Fiji) Suva	Australia	Match Details	1984 Australia tour	
1984-07-21	New Zealand	16	9	SCG	(New South Wales) Sydney	Australia	Match Details	1984 New Zealand tour	Bledisloe Cup
1984-08-04	New Zealand	15	19	Ballymore	(Queensland) Brisbane	New Zealand	Match Details	1984 New Zealand tour	Bledisloe Cup
1984-08-18	New Zealand	24	25	SCG	(New South Wales) Sydney	New Zealand	Match Details	1984 New Zealand tour	Bledisloe Cup
1984-11-03	England	19	3	Twickenham	(England) London	Australia	Match Details	1984 Australia tour	Grand Slam (1st)
1984-11-10	Ireland	16	9	Lansdowne Road	(Ireland) Dublin	Australia	Match Details	1984 Australia tour	Grand Slam (1st)
1984-11-24	Wales	28	9	Cardiff Arms Park	(Wales) Cardiff	Australia	Match Details	1984 Australia tour	Grand Slam (1st)
1984-12-08	Scotland	37	12	Murrayfield	(Scotland) Edinburgh	Australia	Match Details	1984 Australia tour	Grand Slam (1st)
1985-06-15	Canada	59	3	SCG	(New South Wales) Sydney	Australia	Match Details	1985 Canada tour	
1985-06-23	Canada	43	15	Ballymore	(Queensland) Brisbane	Australia	Match Details	1985 Canada tour	
1985-06-29	New Zealand	9	10	Eden Park	(New Zealand) Auckland	New Zealand	Match Details	1985 Australia tour	Bledisloe Cup
1985-08-10	Fiji	52	28	Ballymore	(Queensland) Brisbane	Australia	Match Details	1985 Fiji tour	
1985-08-17	Fiji	31	9	SCG	(New South Wales) Sydney	Australia	Match Details	1985 Fiji tour	
1986-06-01	Italy	39	18	Ballymore	(Queensland) Brisbane	Australia	Match Details	1986 Italy tour	
1986-06-21	France	27	14	SCG	(New South Wales) Sydney	Australia	Match Details	1986 France tour	
1986-07-06	Argentina	39	19	Ballymore	(Queensland) Brisbane	Australia	Match Details	1986 Argentina tour	
1986-07-12	Argentina	26	0	SCG	(New South Wales) Sydney	Australia	Match Details	1986 Argentina tour	
1986-08-09	New Zealand	13	12	Athletic Park	(New Zealand) Wellington	Australia	Match Details	1986 Australia tour	Bledisloe Cup (5th)
1986-08-23	New Zealand	12	13	Carisbrook	(New Zealand) Dunedin	New Zealand	Match Details	1986 Australia tour	Bledisloe Cup (5th)
1986-09-06	New Zealand	22	9	Eden Park	(New Zealand) Auckland	Australia	Match Details	1986 Australia tour	Bledisloe Cup (5th)
1987-05-17	South Korea	65	18	Ballymore	(Queensland) Brisbane	Australia	Match Details	1987 Korea tour	
1987-05-23	England	19	6	Concord Oval	(New South Wales) Sydney	Australia	Match Details	1987 Rugby World Cup	
1987-05-31	United States	47	12	Ballymore	(Queensland) Brisbane	Australia	Match Details	1987 Rugby World Cup	
1987-06-03	Japan	42	23	Concord Oval	(New South Wales) Sydney	Australia	Match Details	1987 Rugby World Cup	
1987-06-07	Ireland	33	15	Concord Oval	(New South Wales) Sydney	Australia	Match Details	1987 Rugby World Cup	
1987-06-13	France	24	30	Concord Oval	(New South Wales) Sydney	France	Match Details	1987 Rugby World Cup	
1987-06-18	Wales	21	22	Rotorua International Stadium	(New Zealand) Rotorua	Wales	Match Details	1987 Rugby World Cup	
1987-07-25	New Zealand	16	30	Concord Oval	(New South Wales) Sydney	New Zealand	Match Details	1987 New Zealand tour	Bledisloe Cup
1987-10-31	Argentina	19	19	José Amalfitani Stadium	(Argentina) Buenos Aires	Drawn	Match Details	1987 Australia tour	
1987-11-07	Argentina	19	27	José Amalfitani Stadium	(Argentina) Buenos Aires	Argentina	Match Details	1987 Australia tour	
1988-05-29	England	22	16	Ballymore	(Queensland) Brisbane	Australia	Match Details	1988 England tour	
1988-06-12	England	28	8	Concord Oval	(New South Wales) Sydney	Australia	Match Details	1988 England tour	
1988-07-03	New Zealand	7	32	Concord Oval	(New South Wales) Sydney	New Zealand	Match Details	1988 New Zealand tour	Bledisloe Cup
1988-07-16	New Zealand	19	19	Ballymore	(Queensland) Brisbane	Drawn	Match Details	1988 New Zealand tour	Bledisloe Cup
1988-07-30	New Zealand	9	30	Concord Oval	(New South Wales) Sydney	New Zealand	Match Details	1988 New Zealand tour	Bledisloe Cup
1988-11-05	England	19	28	Twickenham	(England) London	England	Match Details	1988 Australia tour	
1988-11-19	Scotland	32	13	Murrayfield	(Scotland) Edinburgh	Australia	Match Details	1988 Australia tour	
1988-12-03	Italy	55	6	Stadio Flaminio	(Italy) Rome	Australia	Match Details	1988 Australia tour	
1989-07-01	British & Irish Lions	30	12	Sydney Football Stadium (1988)	(New South Wales) Sydney	Australia	Match Details	1989 British Lions tour	
1989-07-08	British & Irish Lions	12	19	Ballymore	(Queensland) Brisbane	British & Irish Lions	Match Details	1989 British Lions tour	
1989-07-15	British & Irish Lions	18	19	Sydney Football Stadium (1988)	(New South Wales) Sydney	British & Irish Lions	Match Details	1989 British Lions tour	
1989-08-05	New Zealand	12	24	Eden Park	(New Zealand) Auckland	New Zealand	Match Details	1989 Australia tour	Bledisloe Cup
1989-11-04	France	32	15	Stade de la Meinau	(France) Strasbourg	Australia	Match Details	1989 Australia tour	Trophée des Bicentenaires
1989-11-11	France	19	25	Stadium Lille Métropole	(France) Lille	France	Match Details	1989 Australia tour	Trophée des Bicentenaires

== 1990s ==
Date	Opponent	F	A	Venue	City	Winner	Comments	Tour	Competition
1990-06-09	France	21	9	Sydney Football Stadium (1988)	(New South Wales) Sydney	Australia	Match Details	1990 France tour	Trophée des Bicentenaires (1st)
1990-06-24	France	48	31	Ballymore	(Queensland) Brisbane	Australia	Match Details	1990 France tour	Trophée des Bicentenaires (1st)
1990-06-30	France	19	28	Sydney Football Stadium (1988)	(New South Wales) Sydney	France	Match Details	1990 France tour	Trophée des Bicentenaires (1st)
1990-07-08	United States	67	9	Ballymore	(Queensland) Brisbane	Australia	Match Details	1990 United States tour	
1990-07-21	New Zealand	6	21	Lancaster Park	(New Zealand) Christchurch	New Zealand	Match Details	1990 Australia tour	Bledisloe Cup
1990-08-04	New Zealand	17	27	Eden Park	(New Zealand) Auckland	New Zealand	Match Details	1990 Australia tour	Bledisloe Cup
1990-08-18	New Zealand	21	9	Athletic Park	(New Zealand) Wellington	Australia	Match Details	1990 Australia tour	Bledisloe Cup
1991-07-22	Wales	63	6	Ballymore	(Queensland) Brisbane	Australia	Match Details	1991 Wales tour	
1991-07-27	England	40	15	Sydney Football Stadium (1988)	(New South Wales) Sydney	Australia	Match Details	1991 England tour	
1991-08-10	New Zealand	21	12	Sydney Football Stadium (1988)	(New South Wales) Sydney	Australia	Match Details	1991 New Zealand tour	Bledisloe Cup
1991-08-24	New Zealand	3	6	Eden Park	(New Zealand) Auckland	New Zealand	Match Details	1991 Australia tour	Bledisloe Cup
1991-10-04	Argentina	32	19	Stradey Park	(Wales) Llanelli	Australia	Match Details	1991 Rugby World Cup (1st)	
1991-10-09	Samoa	9	3	Pontypool Park	(Wales) Pontypool	Australia	Match Details	1991 Rugby World Cup (1st)	
1991-10-12	Wales	38	3	Cardiff Arms Park	(Wales) Cardiff	Australia	Match Details	1991 Rugby World Cup (1st)	
1991-10-20	Ireland	19	18	Lansdowne Road	(Ireland) Dublin	Australia	Match Details	1991 Rugby World Cup (1st)	
1991-10-27	New Zealand	16	6	Lansdowne Road	(Ireland) Dublin	Australia	Match Details	1991 Rugby World Cup (1st)	
1991-11-02	England	12	6	Twickenham	(England) London	Australia	Match Details	1991 Rugby World Cup (1st)	
1992-06-13	Scotland	27	12	Sydney Football Stadium (1988)	(New South Wales) Sydney	Australia	Match Details	1992 Scotland tour	
1992-06-21	Scotland	37	13	Ballymore	(Queensland) Brisbane	Australia	Match Details	1992 Scotland tour	
1992-07-04	New Zealand	16	15	Sydney Football Stadium (1988)	(New South Wales) Sydney	Australia	Match Details	1992 New Zealand tour	Bledisloe Cup (6th)
1992-07-19	New Zealand	19	17	Ballymore	(Queensland) Brisbane	Australia	Match Details	1992 New Zealand tour	Bledisloe Cup (6th)
1992-07-25	New Zealand	23	26	Sydney Football Stadium (1988)	(New South Wales) Sydney	New Zealand	Match Details	1992 New Zealand tour	Bledisloe Cup (6th)
1992-08-22	South Africa	26	3	Newlands	(South Africa) Cape Town	Australia	Match Details	1992 Australia tour	
1992-10-31	Ireland	42	17	Lansdowne Road	(Ireland) Dublin	Australia	Match Details	1992 Australia tour	
1992-11-21	Wales	23	6	Cardiff Arms Park	(Wales) Cardiff	Australia	Match Details	1992 Australia tour	
1993-07-04	Tonga	52	14	Ballymore	(Queensland) Brisbane	Australia	Match Details	1993 Tonga tour	
1993-07-17	New Zealand	10	25	Carisbrook	(New Zealand) Dunedin	New Zealand	Match Details		Bledisloe Cup
1993-07-31	South Africa	12	19	Sydney Football Stadium (1988)	(New South Wales) Sydney	South Africa	Match Details	1993 South Africa tour	
1993-08-14	South Africa	28	20	Ballymore	(Queensland) Brisbane	Australia	Match Details	1993 South Africa tour	
1993-08-21	South Africa	19	12	Sydney Football Stadium (1988)	(New South Wales) Sydney	Australia	Match Details	1993 South Africa tour	
1993-10-09	Canada	43	16	Kingsland	(Canada) Calgary	Australia	Match Details	1993 Australia tour	
1993-10-30	France	13	16	Stade Chaban-Delmas	(France) Bordeaux	France	Match Details	1993 Australia tour	Trophée des Bicentenaires (2nd)
1993-11-06	France	24	3	Parc des Princes	(France) Paris	Australia	Match Details	1993 Australia tour	Trophée des Bicentenaires (2nd)
1994-06-05	Ireland	33	13	Ballymore	(Queensland) Brisbane	Australia	Match Details	1994 Ireland tour	
1994-06-11	Ireland	32	18	Sydney Football Stadium (1988)	(New South Wales) Sydney	Australia	Match Details	1994 Ireland tour	
1994-06-18	Italy	23	20	Ballymore	(Queensland) Brisbane	Australia	Match Details	1994 Italy tour	
1994-06-25	Italy	20	7	Olympic Park Stadium	(Victoria (state)) Melbourne	Australia	Match Details	1994 Italy tour	
1994-08-06	Samoa	73	3	Sydney Football Stadium (1988)	(New South Wales) Sydney	Australia	Match Details	1994 Western Samoa tour	
1994-08-17	New Zealand	20	16	Sydney Football Stadium (1988)	(New South Wales) Sydney	Australia	Match Details		Bledisloe Cup (7th)
1995-04-30	Argentina	53	7	Ballymore	(Queensland) Brisbane	Australia	Match Details	1995 Argentina tour	
1995-05-06	Argentina	30	13	Sydney Football Stadium (1988)	(New South Wales) Sydney	Australia	Match Details	1995 Argentina tour	
1995-05-25	South Africa	18	27	Newlands	(South Africa) Cape Town	South Africa	Match Details	1995 Rugby World Cup	
1995-05-31	Canada	27	11	Boet Erasmus Stadium	(South Africa) Port Elizabeth	Australia	Match Details	1995 Rugby World Cup	
1995-06-03	Romania	42	3	Danie Craven Stadium	(South Africa) Stellenbosch	Australia	Match Details	1995 Rugby World Cup	
1995-06-11	England	22	25	Newlands	(South Africa) Cape Town	England	Match Details	1995 Rugby World Cup	
1995-07-22	New Zealand	16	28	Eden Park	(New Zealand) Auckland	New Zealand	Match Details		Bledisloe Cup
1995-07-29	New Zealand	23	34	Sydney Football Stadium (1988)	(New South Wales) Sydney	New Zealand	Match Details		Bledisloe Cup
1996-06-09	Wales	56	25	Ballymore	(Queensland) Brisbane	Australia	Match Details	1996 Wales tour	
1996-06-22	Wales	42	3	Sydney Football Stadium (1988)	(New South Wales) Sydney	Australia	Match Details	1996 Wales tour	
1996-06-29	Canada	74	9	Ballymore	(Queensland) Brisbane	Australia	Match Details	1996 Canada tour	
1996-07-06	New Zealand	6	43	Athletic Park	(New Zealand) Wellington	New Zealand	Match Details	1996 Tri Nations	Bledisloe Cup
1996-07-13	South Africa	21	16	Sydney Football Stadium (1988)	(New South Wales) Sydney	Australia	Match Details	1996 Tri Nations	
1996-07-27	New Zealand	25	32	Lang Park	(Queensland) Brisbane	New Zealand	Match Details	1996 Tri Nations	Bledisloe Cup
1996-08-03	South Africa	19	25	Free State Stadium	(South Africa) Bloemfontein	South Africa	Match Details	1996 Tri Nations	
1996-10-23	Italy	40	18	Stadio Plebiscito	(Italy) Padua	Australia	Match Details	1996 Australia tour	
1996-11-09	Scotland	29	19	Murrayfield	(Scotland) Edinburgh	Australia	Match Details	1996 Australia tour	
1996-11-23	Ireland	22	12	Lansdowne Road	(Ireland) Dublin	Australia	Match Details	1996 Australia tour	
1996-12-01	Wales	28	19	Cardiff Arms Park	(Wales) Cardiff	Australia	Match Details	1996 Australia tour	
1997-06-21	France	29	15	Sydney Football Stadium (1988)	(New South Wales) Sydney	Australia	Match Details	1997 France tour	Trophée des Bicentenaires (3rd)
1997-06-28	France	26	19	Ballymore	(Queensland) Brisbane	Australia	Match Details	1997 France tour	Trophée des Bicentenaires (3rd)
1997-07-05	New Zealand	13	30	Lancaster Park	(New Zealand) Christchurch	New Zealand	Match Details		Bledisloe Cup
1997-07-12	England	25	6	Sydney Football Stadium (1988)	(New South Wales) Sydney	Australia	Match Details	1997 England tour	Cook Cup (1st)
1997-07-26	New Zealand	18	33	MCG	(Victoria (state)) Melbourne	New Zealand	Match Details	1997 Tri Nations	Bledisloe Cup
1997-08-02	South Africa	32	20	Lang Park	(Queensland) Brisbane	Australia	Match Details	1997 Tri Nations	
1997-08-16	New Zealand	24	36	Carisbrook	(New Zealand) Dunedin	New Zealand	Match Details	1997 Tri Nations	Bledisloe Cup
1997-08-23	South Africa	22	61	Loftus Versfeld	(South Africa) Pretoria	South Africa	Match Details	1997 Tri Nations	
1997-11-01	Argentina	23	15	Estadio Arquitecto Ricardo Etcheverri	(Argentina) Buenos Aires	Australia	Match Details	1997 Australia tour	
1997-11-08	Argentina	16	18	Estadio Arquitecto Ricardo Etcheverri	(Argentina) Buenos Aires	Argentina	Match Details	1997 Australia tour	
1997-11-15	England	15	15	Twickenham	(England) London	Drawn	Match Details	1997 Australia tour	Cook Cup (2nd)
1997-11-22	Scotland	37	8	Murrayfield	(Scotland) Edinburgh	Australia	Match Details	1997 Australia tour	
1998-06-06	England	76	0	Lang Park	(Queensland) Brisbane	Australia	Match Details	1998 England tour	Cook Cup (3rd)
1998-06-13	Scotland	45	3	Sydney Football Stadium (1988)	(New South Wales) Sydney	Australia	Match Details	1998 Scotland tour	Hopetoun Cup (1st)
1998-06-20	Scotland	33	11	Ballymore	(Queensland) Brisbane	Australia	Match Details	1998 Scotland tour	Hopetoun Cup (1st)
1998-07-11	New Zealand	24	16	MCG	(Victoria (state)) Melbourne	Australia	Match Details	1998 Tri Nations	Bledisloe Cup (8th)
1998-07-18	South Africa	13	14	Subiaco Oval	(Western Australia) Perth	South Africa	Match Details	1998 Tri Nations	
1998-08-01	New Zealand	27	23	Lancaster Park	(New Zealand) Christchurch	Australia	Match Details	1998 Tri Nations	Bledisloe Cup (8th)
1998-08-22	South Africa	15	29	Ellis Park	(South Africa) Johannesburg	South Africa	Match Details	1998 Tri Nations	
1998-08-29	New Zealand	19	14	Sydney Football Stadium (1988)	(New South Wales) Sydney	Australia	Match Details		Bledisloe Cup
1998-09-18	Fiji	66	20	Parramatta Stadium	(New South Wales) Sydney	Australia	Match Details	Rugby World Cup Qualifying: Oceania 3rd Round	
1998-09-22	Tonga	74	0	Canberra Stadium	(Australian Capital Territory) Canberra	Australia	Match Details	Rugby World Cup Qualifying: Oceania 3rd Round	
1998-09-26	Samoa	25	13	Ballymore	(Queensland) Brisbane	Australia	Match Details	Rugby World Cup Qualifying: Oceania 3rd Round	
1998-11-21	France	32	21	Stade de France	(France) Paris	Australia	Match Details	1998 Australia tour	Trophée des Bicentenaires (4th)
1998-11-28	England	12	11	Twickenham	(England) London	Australia	Match Details	1998 Australia tour	Cook Cup (4th)
1999-06-12	Ireland	46	10	Ballymore	(Queensland) Brisbane	Australia	Match Details	1999 Ireland tour	Lansdowne Cup (1st)
1999-06-19	Ireland	32	26	Subiaco Oval	(Western Australia) Perth	Australia	Match Details	1999 Ireland tour	Lansdowne Cup (1st)
1999-06-26	England	22	15	Stadium Australia	(New South Wales) Sydney	Australia	Match Details	1999 England tour	Cook Cup (5th)
1999-07-17	South Africa	32	6	Lang Park	(Queensland) Brisbane	Australia	Match Details	1999 Tri Nations	
1999-07-24	New Zealand	15	34	Eden Park	(New Zealand) Auckland	New Zealand	Match Details	1999 Tri Nations	Bledisloe Cup (9th)
1999-08-14	South Africa	9	10	Newlands	(South Africa) Cape Town	South Africa	Match Details	1999 Tri Nations	
1999-08-28	New Zealand	28	7	Stadium Australia	(New South Wales) Sydney	Australia	Match Details	1999 Tri Nations	Bledisloe Cup (9th)
1999-10-03	Romania	57	9	Ravenhill Stadium	(Ireland) Belfast	Australia	Match Details	1999 Rugby World Cup (2nd)	
1999-10-10	Ireland	23	3	Lansdowne Road	(Ireland) Dublin	Australia	Match Details	1999 Rugby World Cup (2nd)	
1999-10-14	United States	55	19	Thomond Park	(Ireland) Limerick	Australia	Match Details	1999 Rugby World Cup (2nd)	
1999-10-23	Wales	24	9	Millennium Stadium	(Wales) Cardiff	Australia	Match Details	1999 Rugby World Cup (2nd)	
1999-10-30	South Africa	27	21	Twickenham	(England) London	Australia	Match Details	1999 Rugby World Cup (2nd)	
1999-11-06	France	35	12	Millennium Stadium	(Wales) Cardiff	Australia	Match Details	1999 Rugby World Cup (2nd)	

== 2000s ==
Date	Opponent	F	A	Venue	City	Winner	Comments	Tour	Competition
2000-06-17	Argentina	53	6	Ballymore	(Queensland) Brisbane	Australia	Match Details	2000 Argentina tour	Puma Trophy (1st)
2000-06-24	Argentina	32	25	Canberra Stadium	(Australian Capital Territory) Canberra	Australia	Match Details	2000 Argentina tour	Puma Trophy (1st)
2000-07-08	South Africa	44	23	Docklands Stadium	(Victoria (state)) Melbourne	Australia	Match Details	2000 Mandela Challenge Plate	Mandela Challenge Plate (1st)
2000-07-15	New Zealand	35	39	Stadium Australia	(New South Wales) Sydney	New Zealand	Match Details	2000 Tri Nations	Bledisloe Cup (10th)
2000-07-29	South Africa	26	6	Stadium Australia	(New South Wales) Sydney	Australia	Match Details	2000 Tri Nations	
2000-08-05	New Zealand	24	23	Wellington Stadium	(New Zealand) Wellington	Australia	Match Details	2000 Tri Nations	Bledisloe Cup (10th)
2000-08-26	South Africa	19	18	Kings Park Stadium	(South Africa) Durban	Australia	Match Details	2000 Tri Nations	
2000-11-04	France	18	13	Stade de France	(France) Paris	Australia	Match Details	2000 Australia tour	Trophée des Bicentenaires (5th)
2000-11-11	Scotland	30	9	Murrayfield	(Scotland) Edinburgh	Australia	Match Details	2000 Australia tour	Hopetoun Cup (2nd)
2000-11-18	England	19	22	Twickenham	(England) London	England	Match Details	2000 Australia tour	Cook Cup
2001-06-30	British & Irish Lions	13	29	The Gabba	(Queensland) Brisbane	British & Irish Lions	Match Details	2001 British & Irish Lions tour	Tom Richards Cup (1st)
2001-07-07	British & Irish Lions	35	14	Docklands Stadium	(Victoria (state)) Melbourne	Australia	Match Details	2001 British & Irish Lions tour	Tom Richards Cup (1st)
2001-07-14	British & Irish Lions	29	23	Stadium Australia	(New South Wales) Sydney	Australia	Match Details	2001 British & Irish Lions tour	Tom Richards Cup (1st)
2001-07-28	South Africa	15	20	Loftus Versfeld	(South Africa) Pretoria	South Africa	Match Details	2001 Tri Nations	
2001-08-11	New Zealand	23	15	Carisbrook	(New Zealand) Dunedin	Australia	Match Details	2001 Tri Nations	Bledisloe Cup (11th)
2001-08-18	South Africa	14	14	Subiaco Oval	(Western Australia) Perth	Drawn	Match Details	2001 Tri Nations	
2001-09-01	New Zealand	29	26	Stadium Australia	(New South Wales) Sydney	Australia	Match Details	2001 Tri Nations	Bledisloe Cup (11th)
2001-11-01	Spain	92	10	Estadio Nacional Complutense	(Spain) Madrid	Australia	Match Details	2001 Australia tour	
2001-11-10	England	15	21	Twickenham	(England) London	England	Match Details	2001 Australia tour	Cook Cup
2001-11-17	France	13	14	Stade Vélodrome	(France) Marseille	France	Match Details	2001 Australia tour	Trophée des Bicentenaires
2001-11-25	Wales	21	13	Millennium Stadium	(Wales) Cardiff	Australia	Match Details	2001 Australia tour	
2002-06-22	France	29	17	Docklands Stadium	(Victoria (state)) Melbourne	Australia	Match Details	2002 France tour	Trophée des Bicentenaires (6th)
2002-06-29	France	31	25	Stadium Australia	(New South Wales) Sydney	Australia	Match Details	2002 France tour	Trophée des Bicentenaires (6th)
2002-07-13	New Zealand	6	12	Lancaster Park	(New Zealand) Christchurch	New Zealand	Match Details	2002 Tri Nations	Bledisloe Cup (12th)
2002-07-27	South Africa	38	27	The Gabba	(Queensland) Brisbane	Australia	Match Details	2002 Tri Nations	
2002-08-03	New Zealand	16	14	Stadium Australia	(New South Wales) Sydney	Australia	Match Details	2002 Tri Nations	Bledisloe Cup (12th)
2002-08-17	South Africa	31	33	Ellis Park	(South Africa) Johannesburg	South Africa	Match Details	2002 Tri Nations	Mandela Challenge Plate
2002-11-02	Argentina	17	6	Estadio Monumental	(Argentina) Buenos Aires	Australia	Match Details	2002 Australia tour	Puma Trophy (2nd)
2002-11-09	Ireland	9	18	Lansdowne Road	(Ireland) Dublin	Ireland	Match Details	2002 Australia tour	Lansdowne Cup
2002-11-16	England	31	32	Twickenham	(England) London	England	Match Details	2002 Australia tour	Cook Cup
2002-11-23	Italy	34	3	Stadio Luigi Ferraris	(Italy) Genoa	Australia	Match Details	2002 Australia tour	
2003-06-07	Ireland	45	16	Subiaco Oval	(Western Australia) Perth	Australia	Match Details	2003 Ireland tour	Lansdowne Cup (2nd)
2003-06-14	Wales	30	10	Stadium Australia	(New South Wales) Sydney	Australia	Match Details	2003 Wales tour	
2003-06-21	England	14	25	Docklands Stadium	(Victoria (state)) Melbourne	England	Match Details	2003 England tour	Cook Cup
2003-07-12	South Africa	22	26	Newlands	(South Africa) Cape Town	South Africa	Match Details	2003 Tri Nations	
2003-07-26	New Zealand	21	50	Stadium Australia	(New South Wales) Sydney	New Zealand	Match Details	2003 Tri Nations	Bledisloe Cup
2003-08-02	South Africa	29	9	Lang Park	(Queensland) Brisbane	Australia	Match Details	2003 Tri Nations	
2003-08-16	New Zealand	17	21	Eden Park	(New Zealand) Auckland	New Zealand	Match Details	2003 Tri Nations	Bledisloe Cup
2003-10-10	Argentina	24	8	Stadium Australia	(New South Wales) Sydney	Australia	Match Details	2003 Rugby World Cup	
2003-10-18	Romania	90	8	Lang Park	(Queensland) Brisbane	Australia	Match Details	2003 Rugby World Cup	
2003-10-25	Namibia	142	0	Adelaide Oval	(South Australia) Adelaide	Australia	Match Details	2003 Rugby World Cup	
2003-11-01	Ireland	17	16	Docklands Stadium	(Victoria (state)) Melbourne	Australia	Match Details	2003 Rugby World Cup	
2003-11-08	Scotland	33	16	Lang Park	(Queensland) Brisbane	Australia	Match Details	2003 Rugby World Cup	
2003-11-15	New Zealand	22	10	Stadium Australia	(New South Wales) Sydney	Australia	Match Details	2003 Rugby World Cup	
2003-11-22	England	17	20	Stadium Australia	(New South Wales) Sydney	England	Match Details	2003 Rugby World Cup	
2004-06-13	Scotland	35	15	Docklands Stadium	(Victoria (state)) Melbourne	Australia	Match Details	2004 Scotland tour	Hopetoun Cup (3rd)
2004-06-19	Scotland	34	13	Stadium Australia	(New South Wales) Sydney	Australia	Match Details	2004 Scotland tour	Hopetoun Cup (3rd)
2004-06-26	England	51	15	Lang Park	(Queensland) Brisbane	Australia	Match Details	2004 England tour	Cook Cup (6th)
2004-07-03	Pacific Islanders	29	14	Adelaide Oval	(South Australia) Adelaide	Australia	Match Details	2004 June rugby union tests	
2004-07-17	New Zealand	7	16	Wellington Stadium	(New Zealand) Wellington	New Zealand	Match Details	2004 Tri Nations	Bledisloe Cup
2004-07-31	South Africa	30	26	Subiaco Oval	(Western Australia) Perth	Australia	Match Details	2004 Tri Nations	
2004-08-07	New Zealand	23	18	Stadium Australia	(New South Wales) Sydney	Australia	Match Details	2004 Tri Nations	Bledisloe Cup
2004-08-21	South Africa	19	23	Kings Park Stadium	(South Africa) Durban	South Africa	Match Details	2004 Tri Nations	
2004-11-06	Scotland	31	14	Murrayfield	(Scotland) Edinburgh	Australia	Match Details	2004 Australia tour	Hopetoun Cup (4th)
2004-11-13	France	14	27	Stade de France	(France) Paris	France	Match Details	2004 Australia tour	Trophée des Bicentenaires
2004-11-20	Scotland	31	17	Hampden Park	(Scotland) Glasgow	Australia	Match Details	2004 Australia tour	Hopetoun Cup (4th)
2004-11-27	England	21	19	Twickenham	(England) London	Australia	Match Details	2004 Australia tour	Cook Cup (7th)
2005-06-11	Samoa	74	7	Stadium Australia	(New South Wales) Sydney	Australia	Match Details	2005 June rugby union tests	
2005-06-25	Italy	69	21	Docklands Stadium	(Victoria (state)) Melbourne	Australia	Match Details	2005 June rugby union tests	
2005-07-02	France	37	31	Lang Park	(Queensland) Brisbane	Australia	Match Details	2005 France tour	Trophée des Bicentenaires (7th)
2005-07-09	South Africa	30	12	Stadium Australia	(New South Wales) Sydney	Australia	Match Details		Mandela Challenge Plate
2005-07-23	South Africa	20	33	Ellis Park	(South Africa) Johannesburg	South Africa	Match Details		Mandela Challenge Plate
2005-07-30	South Africa	16	22	Loftus Versfeld	(South Africa) Pretoria	South Africa	Match Details	2005 Tri Nations	
2005-08-13	New Zealand	13	30	Stadium Australia	(New South Wales) Sydney	New Zealand	Match Details	2005 Tri Nations	Bledisloe Cup
2005-08-20	South Africa	19	22	Subiaco Oval	(Western Australia) Perth	South Africa	Match Details	2005 Tri Nations	Mandela Challenge Plate
2005-09-03	New Zealand	24	34	Eden Park	(New Zealand) Auckland	New Zealand	Match Details	2005 Tri Nations	Bledisloe Cup
2005-11-05	France	16	26	Stade Vélodrome	(France) Marseille	France	Match Details	2005 Australia tour	Trophée des Bicentenaires
2005-11-12	England	16	26	Twickenham	(England) London	England	Match Details	2005 Australia tour	Cook Cup
2005-11-19	Ireland	30	14	Lansdowne Road	(Ireland) Dublin	Australia	Match Details	2005 Australia tour	Lansdowne Cup (3rd)
2005-11-26	Wales	22	24	Millennium Stadium	(Wales) Cardiff	Wales	Match Details	2005 Australia tour	
2006-06-11	England	34	3	Stadium Australia	(New South Wales) Sydney	Australia	Match Details	2006 England tour	Cook Cup (8th)
2006-06-17	England	43	18	Docklands Stadium	(Victoria (state)) Melbourne	Australia	Match Details	2006 England tour	Cook Cup (8th)
2006-06-24	Ireland	37	15	Subiaco Oval	(Western Australia) Perth	Australia	Match Details	2006 Ireland tour	Lansdowne Cup (4th)
2006-07-08	New Zealand	12	32	Lancaster Park	(New Zealand) Christchurch	New Zealand	Match Details	2006 Tri Nations	Bledisloe Cup
2006-07-15	South Africa	49	0	Lang Park	(Queensland) Brisbane	Australia	Match Details	2006 Tri Nations	Mandela Challenge Plate (2nd)
2006-07-29	New Zealand	9	13	Lang Park	(Queensland) Brisbane	New Zealand	Match Details	2006 Tri Nations	Bledisloe Cup
2006-08-05	South Africa	20	18	Stadium Australia	(New South Wales) Sydney	Australia	Match Details	2006 Tri Nations	Mandela Challenge Plate (2nd)
2006-08-19	New Zealand	27	34	Eden Park	(New Zealand) Auckland	New Zealand	Match Details	2006 Tri Nations	Bledisloe Cup
2006-09-09	South Africa	16	24	Ellis Park	(South Africa) Johannesburg	South Africa	Match Details	2006 Tri Nations	Mandela Challenge Plate (2nd)
2006-11-04	Wales	29	29	Millennium Stadium	(Wales) Cardiff	Drawn	Match Details	2006 Australia tour	
2006-11-11	Italy	25	18	Stadio Flaminio	(Italy) Rome	Australia	Match Details	2006 Australia tour	
2006-11-19	Ireland	6	21	Lansdowne Road	(Ireland) Dublin	Ireland	Match Details	2006 Australia tour	Lansdowne Cup
2006-11-25	Scotland	44	15	Murrayfield	(Scotland) Edinburgh	Australia	Match Details	2006 Australia tour	Hopetoun Cup (5th)
2007-05-26	Wales	29	23	Stadium Australia	(New South Wales) Sydney	Australia	Match Details	2007 Wales tour	James Bevan Trophy (1st)
2007-06-02	Wales	31	0	Lang Park	(Queensland) Brisbane	Australia	Match Details	2007 Wales tour	James Bevan Trophy (1st)
2007-06-09	Fiji	49	0	Subiaco Oval	(Western Australia) Perth	Australia	Match Details	2007 June rugby union tests	
2007-06-16	South Africa	19	22	Newlands	(South Africa) Cape Town	South Africa	Match Details	2007 Tri Nations	Mandela Challenge Plate (3rd)
2007-06-30	New Zealand	20	15	MCG	(Victoria (state)) Melbourne	Australia	Match Details	2007 Tri Nations	Bledisloe Cup
2007-07-07	South Africa	25	17	Stadium Australia	(New South Wales) Sydney	Australia	Match Details	2007 Tri Nations	Mandela Challenge Plate (3rd)
2007-07-21	New Zealand	12	26	Eden Park	(New Zealand) Auckland	New Zealand	Match Details	2007 Tri Nations	Bledisloe Cup
2007-09-08	Japan	91	3	Stade de Gerland	(France) Lyon	Australia	Match Details	2007 Rugby World Cup	
2007-09-15	Wales	32	20	Millennium Stadium	(Wales) Cardiff	Australia	Match Details	2007 Rugby World Cup	
2007-09-23	Fiji	55	12	Stade de la Mosson	(France) Montpellier	Australia	Match Details	2007 Rugby World Cup	
2007-09-29	Canada	37	6	Stade Chaban-Delmas	(France) Bordeaux	Australia	Match Details	2007 Rugby World Cup	
2007-10-06	England	10	12	Stade Vélodrome	(France) Marseille	England	Match Details	2007 Rugby World Cup	
2008-06-14	Ireland	18	12	Docklands Stadium	(Victoria (state)) Melbourne	Australia	Match Details	2008 Ireland tour	Lansdowne Cup (5th)
2008-06-28	France	34	13	Stadium Australia	(New South Wales) Sydney	Australia	Match Details	2008 France tour	Trophée des Bicentenaires (8th)
2008-07-05	France	40	10	Lang Park	(Queensland) Brisbane	Australia	Match Details	2008 France tour	Trophée des Bicentenaires (8th)
2008-07-19	South Africa	16	9	Subiaco Oval	(Western Australia) Perth	Australia	Match Details	2008 Tri Nations	Mandela Challenge Plate (4th)
2008-07-26	New Zealand	34	19	Stadium Australia	(New South Wales) Sydney	Australia	Match Details	2008 Tri Nations	Bledisloe Cup
2008-08-02	New Zealand	10	39	Eden Park	(New Zealand) Auckland	New Zealand	Match Details	2008 Tri Nations	Bledisloe Cup
2008-08-23	South Africa	27	15	Kings Park Stadium	(South Africa) Durban	Australia	Match Details	2008 Tri Nations	Mandela Challenge Plate (4th)
2008-08-30	South Africa	8	53	Ellis Park	(South Africa) Johannesburg	South Africa	Match Details	2008 Tri Nations	Mandela Challenge Plate (4th)
2008-09-13	New Zealand	24	28	Lang Park	(Queensland) Brisbane	New Zealand	Match Details	2008 Tri Nations	Bledisloe Cup
2008-11-01	New Zealand	14	19	Hong Kong Stadium	Hong Kong	New Zealand	Match Details	2008 Australia tour	Bledisloe Cup
2008-11-08	Italy	30	20	Stadio Euganeo	(Italy) Padua	Australia	Match Details	2008 Australia tour	
2008-11-15	England	28	14	Twickenham	(England) London	Australia	Match Details	2008 Australia tour	Cook Cup (9th)
2008-11-22	France	18	13	Stade de France	(France) Paris	Australia	Match Details	2008 Australia tour	Trophée des Bicentenaires (9th)
2008-11-29	Wales	18	21	Millennium Stadium	(Wales) Cardiff	Wales	Match Details	2008 Australia tour	James Bevan Trophy
2009-06-13	Italy	31	8	Canberra Stadium	(Australian Capital Territory) Canberra	Australia	Match Details	2009 June rugby union tests	
2009-06-20	Italy	34	12	Docklands Stadium	(Victoria (state)) Melbourne	Australia	Match Details	2009 June rugby union tests	
2009-06-27	France	22	6	Stadium Australia	(New South Wales) Sydney	Australia	Match Details	2009 June rugby union tests	Trophée des Bicentenaires (10th)
2009-07-18	New Zealand	16	22	Eden Park	(New Zealand) Auckland	New Zealand	Match Details	2009 Tri Nations	Bledisloe Cup
2009-08-08	South Africa	17	29	Newlands	(South Africa) Cape Town	South Africa	Match Details	2009 Tri Nations	Mandela Challenge Plate
2009-08-22	New Zealand	18	19	Stadium Australia	(New South Wales) Sydney	New Zealand	Match Details	2009 Tri Nations	Bledisloe Cup
2009-08-29	South Africa	25	32	Subiaco Oval	(Western Australia) Perth	South Africa	Match Details	2009 Tri Nations	Mandela Challenge Plate
2009-09-05	South Africa	21	6	Lang Park	(Queensland) Brisbane	Australia	Match Details	2009 Tri Nations	Mandela Challenge Plate
2009-09-19	New Zealand	6	33	Wellington Stadium	(New Zealand) Wellington	New Zealand	Match Details	2009 Tri Nations	Bledisloe Cup
2009-10-31	New Zealand	19	32	Olympic Stadium	(Japan) Tokyo	New Zealand	Match Details	2009 Australia tour Grand Slam	Bledisloe Cup
2009-11-07	England	18	9	Twickenham	(England) London	Australia	Match Details	2009 Australia tour Grand Slam	Cook Cup (10th)
2009-11-15	Ireland	20	20	Croke Park	(Ireland) Dublin	Drawn	Match Details	2009 Australia tour Grand Slam	Lansdowne Cup (6th)
2009-11-21	Scotland	8	9	Murrayfield	(Scotland) Edinburgh	Scotland	Match Details	2009 Australia tour Grand Slam	Hopetoun Cup
2009-11-28	Wales	33	12	Millennium Stadium	(Wales) Cardiff	Australia	Match Details	2009 Australia tour Grand Slam	James Bevan Trophy (2nd)

== 2010s ==
Date	Opponent	F	A	Venue	City	Winner	Comments	Tour	Competition
2010-06-05	Fiji	49	3	Canberra Stadium	(Australian Capital Territory) Canberra	Australia	Match Report	2010 June rugby union tests	
2010-06-12	England	27	17	Subiaco Oval	(Western Australia) Perth	Australia	Match Report	2010 England tour	Cook Cup (11th)
2010-06-19	England	20	21	Stadium Australia	(New South Wales) Sydney	England	Match Report	2010 England tour	Cook Cup (11th)
2010-06-26	Ireland	22	15	Lang Park	(Queensland) Brisbane	Australia	Match Report	2010 June rugby union tests	Lansdowne Cup (7th)
2010-07-24	South Africa	30	13	Lang Park	(Queensland) Brisbane	Australia	Match Report	2010 Tri Nations	Mandela Challenge Plate
2010-07-31	New Zealand	28	49	Docklands Stadium	(Victoria (state)) Melbourne	New Zealand	Match Report	2010 Tri Nations	Bledisloe Cup
2010-08-07	New Zealand	10	20	Lancaster Park	(New Zealand) Christchurch	New Zealand	Match Report	2010 Tri Nations	Bledisloe Cup
2010-08-28	South Africa	31	44	Loftus Versfeld	(South Africa) Pretoria	South Africa	Match Report	2010 Tri Nations	Mandela Challenge Plate
2010-09-04	South Africa	41	39	Free State Stadium	(South Africa) Bloemfontein	Australia	Match Report	2010 Tri Nations	Mandela Challenge Plate
2010-09-11	New Zealand	22	23	Stadium Australia	(New South Wales) Sydney	New Zealand	Match Report	2010 Tri Nations	Bledisloe Cup
2010-10-30	New Zealand	26	24	Hong Kong Stadium	Hong Kong	Australia	Match Report	2010 Australia tour	Bledisloe Cup
2010-11-06	Wales	25	16	Millennium Stadium	(Wales) Cardiff	Australia	Match Report	2010 Australia tour	James Bevan Trophy (3rd)
2010-11-13	England	18	35	Twickenham	(England) London	England	Match Report	2010 Australia tour	Cook Cup
2010-11-20	Italy	32	14	Stadio Artemio Franchi	(Italy) Florence	Australia	Match Report	2010 Australia tour	
2010-11-27	France	59	16	Stade de France	(France) Paris	Australia	Match Report	2010 Australia tour	Trophée des Bicentenaires (11th)
2011-07-17	Samoa	23	32	Stadium Australia	(New South Wales) Sydney	Samoa	Match Report	2011 June rugby union tests	
2011-07-23	South Africa	39	20	Stadium Australia	(New South Wales) Sydney	Australia	Match Report	2011 Tri Nations	Mandela Challenge Plate
2011-08-06	New Zealand	14	30	Eden Park	(New Zealand) Auckland	New Zealand	Match Report	2011 Tri Nations	Bledisloe Cup
2011-08-13	South Africa	14	9	Kings Park Stadium	(South Africa) Durban	Australia	Match Report	2011 Tri Nations	Mandela Challenge Plate
2011-08-27	New Zealand	25	20	Lang Park	(Queensland) Brisbane	Australia	Match Report	2011 Tri Nations	Bledisloe Cup
2011-09-11	Italy	32	6	North Harbour Stadium	(New Zealand) Auckland	Australia	Match Report	2011 Rugby World Cup	
2011-09-17	Ireland	6	15	Eden Park	(New Zealand) Auckland	Ireland	Match Report	2011 Rugby World Cup	
2011-09-23	United States	67	5	Wellington Stadium	(New Zealand) Wellington	Australia	Match Report	2011 Rugby World Cup	
2011-10-01	Russia	68	22	Trafalgar Park	(New Zealand) Nelson	Australia	Match Report	2011 Rugby World Cup	
2011-10-09	South Africa	11	9	Wellington Stadium	(New Zealand) Wellington	Australia	Match Report	2011 Rugby World Cup	
2011-10-16	New Zealand	6	20	Eden Park	(New Zealand) Auckland	New Zealand	Match Report	2011 Rugby World Cup	
2011-10-21	Wales	21	18	Eden Park	(New Zealand) Auckland	Australia	Match Report	2011 Rugby World Cup	
2011-12-03	Wales	24	18	Millennium Stadium	(Wales) Cardiff	Australia	Match Report		James Bevan Trophy (4th)
2012-06-05	Scotland	6	9	Newcastle International Sports Centre	(New South Wales) Newcastle	Scotland	Match Report	2012 Scotland tour	Hopetoun Cup
2012-06-09	Wales	27	19	Lang Park	(Queensland) Brisbane	Australia	Match Report	2012 Wales tour	James Bevan Trophy (5th)
2012-06-16	Wales	25	23	Docklands Stadium	(Victoria (state)) Melbourne	Australia	Match Report	2012 Wales tour	James Bevan Trophy (5th)
2012-06-23	Wales	20	19	Sydney Football Stadium (1988)	(New South Wales) Sydney	Australia	Match Details	2012 Wales tour	James Bevan Trophy (5th)
2012-08-18	New Zealand	19	27	Stadium Australia	(New South Wales) Sydney	New Zealand	Match Details	2012 Rugby Championship	Bledisloe Cup
2012-08-25	New Zealand	0	22	Eden Park	(New Zealand) Auckland	New Zealand	Match Details	2012 Rugby Championship	Bledisloe Cup
2012-09-08	South Africa	26	19	Subiaco Oval	(Western Australia) Perth	Australia	Match Details	2012 Rugby Championship	Mandela Challenge Plate
2012-09-15	Argentina	23	19	Robina Stadium	(Queensland) Gold Coast	Australia	Match Details	2012 Rugby Championship	Puma Trophy (3rd)
2012-09-29	South Africa	8	31	Loftus Versfeld	(South Africa) Pretoria	South Africa	Match Details	2012 Rugby Championship	Mandela Challenge Plate
2012-10-06	Argentina	25	19	Estadio Gigante de Arroyito	(Argentina) Rosario	Australia	Match Details	2012 Rugby Championship	Puma Trophy (3rd)
2012-10-20	New Zealand	18	18	Lang Park	(Queensland) Brisbane	Drawn	Match Details	2012 Australia tour	Bledisloe Cup
2012-11-10	France	6	33	Stade de France	(France) Paris	France	Match Details	2012 Australia tour	Trophée des Bicentenaires
2012-11-17	England	20	14	Twickenham	(England) London	Australia	Match Details	2012 Australia tour	Cook Cup (12th)
2012-11-24	Italy	22	19	Stadio Artemio Franchi	(Italy) Florence	Australia	Match Details	2012 Australia tour	
2012-12-02	Wales	14	12	Millennium Stadium	(Wales) Cardiff	Australia	Match Details	2012 Australia tour	James Bevan Trophy (6th)
2013-06-22	British & Irish Lions	21	23	Lang Park	(Queensland) Brisbane	British & Irish Lions	Match Details	2013 British & Irish Lions tour	Tom Richards Trophy
2013-06-29	British & Irish Lions	16	15	Docklands Stadium	(Victoria (state)) Melbourne	Australia	Match Details	2013 British & Irish Lions tour	Tom Richards Trophy
2013-07-06	British & Irish Lions	16	41	Stadium Australia	(New South Wales) Sydney	British & Irish Lions	Match Details	2013 British & Irish Lions tour	Tom Richards Trophy
2013-08-17	New Zealand	29	47	Stadium Australia	(New South Wales) Sydney	New Zealand	Match Details	2013 Rugby Championship	Bledisloe Cup
2013-08-24	New Zealand	16	27	Wellington Stadium	(New Zealand) Wellington	New Zealand	Match Details	2013 Rugby Championship	Bledisloe Cup
2013-09-07	South Africa	12	38	Lang Park	(Queensland) Brisbane	South Africa	Match Details	2013 Rugby Championship	Mandela Challenge Plate
2013-09-14	Argentina	14	13	Subiaco Oval	(Western Australia) Perth	Australia	Match Details	2013 Rugby Championship	Puma Trophy (4th)
2013-09-28	South Africa	8	28	Newlands	(South Africa) Cape Town	South Africa	Match Details	2013 Rugby Championship	Mandela Challenge Plate
2013-10-05	Argentina	54	17	Estadio Gigante de Arroyito	(Argentina) Rosario	Australia	Match Details	2013 Rugby Championship	Puma Trophy (4th)
2013-10-19	New Zealand	33	41	Forsyth Barr Stadium	(New Zealand) Dunedin	New Zealand	Match Details	2013 Australia tour Grand Slam	Bledisloe Cup
2013-11-02	England	13	20	Twickenham	(England) London	England	Match Details	2013 Australia tour Grand Slam	Cook Cup
2013-11-09	Italy	50	20	Stadio Olimpico Grande Torino	(Italy) Turin	Australia	Match Details	2013 Australia tour Grand Slam	
2013-11-16	Ireland	32	15	Aviva Stadium	(Ireland) Dublin	Australia	Match Details	2013 Australia tour Grand Slam	Lansdowne Cup (8th)
2013-11-23	Scotland	21	15	Murrayfield	(Scotland) Edinburgh	Australia	Match Details	2013 Australia tour Grand Slam	Hopetoun Cup (6th)
2013-11-30	Wales	30	26	Millennium Stadium	(Wales) Cardiff	Australia	Match Details	2013 Australia tour Grand Slam	James Bevan Trophy (7th)
2014-06-07	France	50	23	Lang Park	(Queensland) Brisbane	Australia	Match Details	2014 France tour	Trophée des Bicentenaires (12th)
2014-06-14	France	6	0	Docklands Stadium	(Victoria (state)) Melbourne	Australia	Match Details	2014 France tour	Trophée des Bicentenaires (12th)
2014-06-21	France	39	13	Sydney Football Stadium (1988)	(New South Wales) Sydney	Australia	Match Details	2014 France tour	Trophée des Bicentenaires (12th)
2014-08-16	New Zealand	12	12	Stadium Australia	(New South Wales) Sydney	Drawn	Match Details	2014 Rugby Championship	Bledisloe Cup
2014-08-23	New Zealand	20	51	Eden Park	(New Zealand) Auckland	New Zealand	Match Details	2014 Rugby Championship	Bledisloe Cup
2014-09-06	South Africa	24	23	Subiaco Oval	(Western Australia) Perth	Australia	Match Details	2014 Rugby Championship	Mandela Challenge Plate
2014-09-13	Argentina	32	25	Robina Stadium	(Queensland) Gold Coast	Australia	Match Details	2014 Rugby Championship	Puma Trophy (5th)
2014-09-27	South Africa	10	28	Newlands	(South Africa) Cape Town	South Africa	Match Details	2014 Rugby Championship	Mandela Challenge Plate
2014-10-04	Argentina	17	21	El Malvinas Argentinas	(Argentina) Mendoza	Argentina	Match Details	2014 Rugby Championship	Puma Trophy (5th)
2014-10-18	New Zealand	28	29	Lang Park	(Queensland) Brisbane	New Zealand	Match Details	2014 Australia tour	Bledisloe Cup
2014-11-08	Wales	33	28	Millennium Stadium	(Wales) Cardiff	Australia	Match Details	2014 Australia tour	James Bevan Trophy (8th)
2014-11-15	France	26	29	Stade de France	(France) Paris	France	Match Details	2014 Australia tour	Trophée des Bicentenaires
2014-11-22	Ireland	23	26	Aviva Stadium	(Ireland) Dublin	Ireland	Match Details	2014 Australia tour	Lansdowne Cup
2014-11-29	England	17	26	Twickenham	(England) London	England	Match Details	2014 Australia tour	Cook Cup
2015-07-18	South Africa	24	20	Lang Park	(Queensland) Brisbane	Australia	Match Details	2015 Rugby Championship	Mandela Challenge Plate
2015-07-25	Argentina	34	9	El Malvinas Argentinas	(Argentina) Mendoza	Australia	Match Details	2015 Rugby Championship	Puma Trophy (6th)
2015-08-08	New Zealand	27	19	Stadium Australia	(New South Wales) Sydney	Australia	Match Details	2015 Rugby Championship	Bledisloe Cup
2015-08-15	New Zealand	13	41	Eden Park	(New Zealand) Auckland	New Zealand	Match Details	2015 Pre-RWC internationals	Bledisloe Cup
2015-09-05	United States	47	10	Soldier Field	(United States) Chicago	Australia	Match Details	2015 Pre-RWC internationals	
2015-09-23	Fiji	28	13	Millennium Stadium	(Wales) Cardiff	Australia	Match Details	2015 Rugby World Cup	
2015-09-27	Uruguay	65	3	Villa Park	(England) Birmingham	Australia	Match Details	2015 Rugby World Cup	
2015-10-03	England	33	13	Twickenham	(England) London	Australia	Match Details	2015 Rugby World Cup	
2015-10-10	Wales	15	6	Twickenham	(England) London	Australia	Match Details	2015 Rugby World Cup	
2015-10-18	Scotland	35	34	Twickenham	(England) London	Australia	Match Details	2015 Rugby World Cup	
2015-10-25	Argentina	29	15	Twickenham	(England) London	Australia	Match Details	2015 Rugby World Cup	
2015-10-31	New Zealand	17	34	Twickenham	(England) London	New Zealand	Match Details	2015 Rugby World Cup	
2016-06-11	England	28	39	Lang Park	(Queensland) Brisbane	England	Match Details	2016 England tour	Cook Cup
2016-06-18	England	7	23	Melbourne Rectangular Stadium	(Victoria (state)) Melbourne	England	Match Details	2016 England tour	Cook Cup
2016-06-25	England	40	44	Sydney Football Stadium (1988)	(New South Wales) Sydney	England	Match Details	2016 England tour	Cook Cup
2016-08-20	New Zealand	8	42	Stadium Australia	(New South Wales) Sydney	New Zealand	Match Details	2016 Rugby Championship	Bledisloe Cup
2016-08-27	New Zealand	9	29	Wellington Stadium	(New Zealand) Wellington	New Zealand	Match Details	2016 Rugby Championship	Bledisloe Cup
2016-09-10	South Africa	23	17	Lang Park	(Queensland) Brisbane	Australia	Match Details	2016 Rugby Championship	Mandela Challenge Plate
2016-09-17	Argentina	36	20	Perth Rectangular Stadium	(Western Australia) Perth	Australia	Match Details	2016 Rugby Championship	Puma Trophy (7th)
2016-10-01	South Africa	10	18	Loftus Versfeld	(South Africa) Pretoria	South Africa	Match Details	2016 Rugby Championship	Mandela Challenge Plate
2016-10-08	Argentina	33	21	Twickenham	(England) London	Australia	Match Details	2016 Rugby Championship	Puma Trophy (7th)
2016-10-22	New Zealand	10	37	Eden Park	(New Zealand) Auckland	New Zealand	Match Details	2016 Australia tour Grand Slam	Bledisloe Cup
2016-11-05	Wales	32	8	Millennium Stadium	(Wales) Cardiff	Australia	Match Details	2016 Australia tour Grand Slam	James Bevan Trophy (9th)
2016-11-12	Scotland	23	22	Murrayfield	(Scotland) Edinburgh	Australia	Match Details	2016 Australia tour Grand Slam	Hopetoun Cup (7th)
2016-11-19	France	25	23	Stade de France	(France) Paris	Australia	Match Details	2016 Australia tour Grand Slam	Trophée des Bicentenaires (13th)
2016-11-26	Ireland	24	27	Aviva Stadium	(Ireland) Dublin	Ireland	Match Details	2016 Australia tour Grand Slam	Lansdowne Cup
2016-12-03	England	21	37	Twickenham	(England) London	England	Match Details	2016 Australia tour Grand Slam	Cook Cup
2017-06-10	Fiji	37	14	Melbourne Rectangular Stadium	(Victoria (state)) Melbourne	Australia	Match Details	2017 June rugby union tests	
2017-06-17	Scotland	19	24	Sydney Football Stadium (1988)	(New South Wales) Sydney	Scotland	Match Details	2017 June rugby union tests	Hopetoun Cup
2017-06-24	Italy	40	27	Lang Park	(Queensland) Brisbane	Australia	Match Details	2017 June rugby union tests	
2017-08-19	New Zealand	34	54	Stadium Australia	(New South Wales) Sydney	New Zealand	Match Details	2017 Rugby Championship	Bledisloe Cup
2017-08-26	New Zealand	29	35	Forsyth Barr Stadium	(New Zealand) Dunedin	New Zealand	Match Details	2017 Rugby Championship	Bledisloe Cup
2017-09-09	South Africa	23	23	Perth Rectangular Stadium	(Western Australia) Perth	Drawn	Match Details	2017 Rugby Championship	Mandela Challenge Plate
2017-09-16	Argentina	45	20	Canberra Stadium	(Australian Capital Territory) Canberra	Australia	Match Stats	2017 Rugby Championship	Puma Trophy (8th)
2017-09-30	South Africa	27	27	Free State Stadium	(South Africa) Bloemfontein	Drawn	Match Stats	2017 Rugby Championship	Mandela Challenge Plate
2017-10-07	Argentina	37	20	El Malvinas Argentinas	(Argentina) Mendoza	Australia	Match Details	2017 Rugby Championship	Puma Trophy (8th)
2017-10-21	New Zealand	23	18	Lang Park	(Queensland) Brisbane	Australia	Match Details	2017 Australia tour	Bledisloe Cup
2017-11-04	Japan	63	30	Nissan Stadium	(Japan) Yokohama	Australia	Match Details	2017 Australia tour	
2017-11-11	Wales	29	21	Millennium Stadium	(Wales) Cardiff	Australia	Match Details	2017 Australia tour	James Bevan Trophy (10th)
2017-11-18	England	6	30	Twickenham	(England) London	England	Match Details	2017 Australia tour	Cook Cup
2017-11-25	Scotland	24	53	Murrayfield	(Scotland) Edinburgh	Scotland	Match Details	2017 Australia tour	Hopetoun Cup
2018-06-09	Ireland	19	8	Lang Park	(Queensland) Brisbane	Australia	Match Details	2018 Ireland tour	Lansdowne Cup
2018-06-16	Ireland	21	26	Melbourne Rectangular Stadium	(Victoria (state)) Melbourne	Ireland	Match Details	2018 Ireland tour	Lansdowne Cup
2018-06-23	Ireland	16	20	Sydney Football Stadium (1988)	(New South Wales) Sydney	Ireland	Match Details	2018 Ireland tour	Lansdowne Cup
2018-08-18	New Zealand	13	38	Stadium Australia	(New South Wales) Sydney	New Zealand	Match Details	2018 Rugby Championship	Bledisloe Cup
2018-08-25	New Zealand	12	40	Eden Park	(New Zealand) Auckland	New Zealand	Match Details	2018 Rugby Championship	Bledisloe Cup
2018-09-08	South Africa	23	18	Lang Park	(Queensland) Brisbane	Australia	Match Details	2018 Rugby Championship	Mandela Challenge Plate
2018-09-15	Argentina	19	23	Robina Stadium	(Queensland) Gold Coast	Argentina	Match Details	2018 Rugby Championship	Puma Trophy (9th)
2018-09-29	South Africa	12	23	Nelson Mandela Bay Stadium	(South Africa) Port Elizabeth	South Africa	Match Details	2018 Rugby Championship	Mandela Challenge Plate
2018-10-06	Argentina	45	34	El Malvinas Argentinas	(Argentina) Mendoza	Australia	Match Details	2018 Rugby Championship	Puma Trophy (9th)
2018-10-27	New Zealand	20	37	Nissan Stadium	(Japan) Yokohama	New Zealand	Match Details	2018 Australia tour	Bledisloe Cup
2018-11-10	Wales	6	9	Millennium Stadium	(Wales) Cardiff	Wales	Match Details	2018 Australia tour	James Bevan Trophy
2018-11-17	Italy	26	7	Stadio Euganeo	(Italy) Padua	Australia	Match Details	2018 Australia tour	
2018-11-24	England	18	37	Twickenham	(England) London	England	Match Details	2018 Australia tour	Cook Cup
2019-07-20	South Africa	17	35	Ellis Park	(South Africa) Johannesburg	South Africa	Match Details	2019 Rugby Championship	Mandela Challenge Plate
2019-07-27	Argentina	16	10	Lang Park	(Queensland) Brisbane	Australia	Match Details	2019 Rugby Championship	Puma Trophy (10th)
2019-08-10	New Zealand	47	26	Perth Stadium	(Western Australia) Perth	Australia	Match Details	2019 Rugby Championship	Bledisloe Cup
2019-08-17	New Zealand	0	36	Eden Park	(New Zealand) Auckland	New Zealand	Match Details	2019 Pre-RWC internationals	Bledisloe Cup
2019-09-07	Samoa	34	15	Western Sydney Stadium	(New South Wales) Sydney	Australia	Match Details	2019 Pre-RWC internationals	
2019-09-21	Fiji	39	21	Sapporo Dome	(Japan) Sapporo	Australia	Match Details	2019 Rugby World Cup	
2019-09-29	Wales	25	29	Ajinomoto Stadium	(Japan) Chōfu	Wales	Match Details	2019 Rugby World Cup	
2019-10-05	Uruguay	45	10	Resonac Dome Oita	(Japan) Ōita	Australia	Match Details	2019 Rugby World Cup	
2019-10-11	Georgia	27	8	Shizuoka Stadium	(Japan) Fukuroi	Australia	Match Details	2019 Rugby World Cup	
2019-10-19	England	16	40	Resonac Dome Oita	(Japan) Ōita	England	Match Details	2019 Rugby World Cup	

== 2020s ==
Date	Opponent	F	A	Venue	City	Winner	Comments	Tour	Competition
2020-10-11	New Zealand	16	16	Wellington Stadium	(New Zealand) Wellington	Drawn	Match Details	2020 end-of-year internationals	Bledisloe Cup
2020-10-18	New Zealand	7	27	Eden Park	(New Zealand) Auckland	New Zealand	Match Details	2020 end-of-year internationals	Bledisloe Cup
2020-10-31	New Zealand	5	43	Stadium Australia	(New South Wales) Sydney	New Zealand	Match Details	2020 Tri Nations	Bledisloe Cup
2020-11-07	New Zealand	24	22	Lang Park	(Queensland) Brisbane	Australia	Match Details	2020 Tri Nations	Bledisloe Cup
2020-11-21	Argentina	15	15	Newcastle International Sports Centre	(New South Wales) Newcastle	Drawn	Match Details	2020 Tri Nations	Puma Trophy
2020-12-05	Argentina	16	16	Western Sydney Stadium	(New South Wales) Sydney	Drawn	Match Details	2020 Tri Nations	Puma Trophy
2021-07-07	France	23	21	Lang Park	(Queensland) Brisbane	Australia	Match Details	2021 France tour	Trophée des Bicentenaires
2021-07-13	France	26	28	Melbourne Rectangular Stadium	(Victoria (state)) Melbourne	France	Match Details	2021 France tour	Trophée des Bicentenaires
2021-07-17	France	33	30	Lang Park	(Queensland) Brisbane	Australia	Match Details	2021 France tour	Trophée des Bicentenaires
2021-08-07	New Zealand	25	33	Eden Park	(New Zealand) Auckland	New Zealand	Match Details	2021 July rugby union tests	Bledisloe Cup
2021-08-14	New Zealand	22	57	Eden Park	(New Zealand) Auckland	New Zealand	Match Details	2021 Rugby Championship	Bledisloe Cup
2021-09-05	New Zealand	21	38	Perth Stadium	(Western Australia) Perth	New Zealand	Match Details	2021 Rugby Championship	Bledisloe Cup
2021-09-12	South Africa	28	26	Robina Stadium	(Queensland) Gold Coast	Australia	Match Details	2021 Rugby Championship	Mandela Challenge Plate
2021-09-18	South Africa	30	17	Lang Park	(Queensland) Brisbane	Australia	Match Details	2021 Rugby Championship	Mandela Challenge Plate
2021-09-25	Argentina	27	8	North Queensland Stadium	(Queensland) Townsville	Australia	Match Details	2021 Rugby Championship	Puma Trophy
2021-10-02	Argentina	32	17	Robina Stadium	(Queensland) Gold Coast	Australia	Match Details	2021 Rugby Championship	Puma Trophy
2021-10-23	Japan	32	23	Resonac Dome Oita	(Japan) Oita	Australia	Match Details	2021 Australia tour	
2021-11-07	Scotland	13	15	Murrayfield	(Scotland) Edinburgh	Scotland	Match Details	2021 Australia tour	Hopetoun Cup
2021-11-13	England	15	32	Twickenham	(England) London	England	Match Details	2021 Australia tour	Cook Cup
2021-11-20	Wales	28	29	Millennium Stadium	(Wales) Cardiff	Wales	Match Details	2021 Australia tour	James Bevan Trophy
2022-07-02	England	30	28	Perth Stadium	(Western Australia) Perth	Australia	Match Details	2022 England tour	Ella–Mobbs Trophy
2022-07-09	England	17	25	Lang Park	(Queensland) Brisbane	England	Match Details	2022 England tour	Ella–Mobbs Trophy
2022-07-16	England	17	21	SCG	(New South Wales) Sydney	England	Match Details	2022 England tour	Ella–Mobbs Trophy
2022-08-07	Argentina	41	26	El Malvinas Argentinas	(Argentina) Mendoza	Australia	Match Details	2022 Rugby Championship	Puma Trophy
2022-08-14	Argentina	17	48	Estadio San Juan del Bicentenario	(Argentina) San Juan	Argentina	Match Details	2022 Rugby Championship	Puma Trophy
2022-08-27	South Africa	25	17	Adelaide Oval	(South Australia) Adelaide	Australia	Match Details	2022 Rugby Championship	Mandela Challenge Plate
2022-09-03	South Africa	8	24	Sydney Football Stadium (2022)	(New South Wales) Sydney	South Africa	Match Details	2022 Rugby Championship	Mandela Challenge Plate
2022-09-15	New Zealand	37	39	Docklands Stadium	(Victoria (state)) Melbourne	New Zealand	Match Details	2022 Rugby Championship	Bledisloe Cup
2022-09-24	New Zealand	14	40	Eden Park	(New Zealand) Auckland	New Zealand	Match Details	2022 Rugby Championship	Bledisloe Cup
2022-10-30	Scotland	16	15	Murrayfield	(Scotland) Edinburgh	Australia	Match Details	2022 Australia tour	Hopetoun Cup
2022-11-05	France	29	30	Stade de France	(France) Paris	France	Match Details	2022 Australia tour	Trophée des Bicentenaires
2022-11-12	Italy	27	28	Stadio Artemio Franchi	(Italy) Florence	Italy	Match Details	2022 Australia tour	
2022-11-19	Ireland	10	13	Aviva Stadium	(Ireland) Dublin	Ireland	Match Details	2022 Australia tour	Lansdowne Cup
2022-11-26	Wales	39	34	Millennium Stadium	(Wales) Cardiff	Australia	Match Details	2022 Australia tour	James Bevan Trophy
2023-07-09	South Africa	12	43	Loftus Versfeld	(South Africa) Pretoria	South Africa	Match Details	2023 Rugby Championship	Mandela Challenge Plate
2023-07-15	Argentina	31	34	Western Sydney Stadium	(New South Wales) Sydney	Argentina	Match Details	2023 Rugby Championship	Puma Trophy
2023-07-29	New Zealand	7	38	MCG	(Victoria (state)) Melbourne	New Zealand	Match Details	2023 Rugby Championship	Bledisloe Cup
2023-08-05	New Zealand	20	23	Forsyth Barr Stadium	(New Zealand) Dunedin	New Zealand	Match Details	2023 Pre-RWC internationals	Bledisloe Cup
2023-08-26	France	17	41	Stade de France	(France) Paris	France	Match Details	2023 Pre-RWC internationals	Trophée des Bicentenaires
2023-09-09	Georgia	35	15	Stade de France	(France) Paris	Australia	Match Details	2023 Rugby World Cup	
2023-09-17	Fiji	15	22	Stade Geoffroy-Guichard	(France) Saint-Étienne	Fiji	Match Details	2023 Rugby World Cup	
2023-09-24	Wales	6	40	Parc Olympique Lyonnais	(France) Lyon	Wales	Match Details	2023 Rugby World Cup	
2023-10-01	Portugal	34	14	Stade Geoffroy-Guichard	(France) Saint-Étienne	Australia	Match Details	2023 Rugby World Cup	
2024-07-06	Wales	25	16	Sydney Football Stadium (2022)	(New South Wales) Sydney	Australia	Match Details	2024 Wales tour	James Bevan Trophy
2024-07-13	Wales	36	28	Melbourne Rectangular Stadium	(Victoria (state)) Melbourne	Australia	Match Details	2024 Wales tour	James Bevan Trophy
2024-07-20	Georgia	40	29	Sydney Football Stadium (2022)	(New South Wales) Sydney	Australia	Match Details	2024 Summer International	
2024-08-10	South Africa	7	33	Lang Park	(Queensland) Brisbane	South Africa	Match Details	2024 Rugby Championship	Mandela Challenge Plate
2024-08-17	South Africa	12	30	Perth Stadium	(Western Australia) Perth	South Africa	Match Details	2024 Rugby Championship	Mandela Challenge Plate
2024-08-31	Argentina	20	19	Estadio Jorge Luis Hirschi	(Argentina) La Plata	Australia	Match Details	2024 Rugby Championship	Puma Trophy
2024-09-07	Argentina	27	67	Estadio Brigadier General Estanislao López	(Argentina) Santa Fe	Argentina	Match Details	2024 Rugby Championship	Puma Trophy
2024-09-21	New Zealand	28	31	Stadium Australia	(New South Wales) Sydney	New Zealand	Match Details	2024 Rugby Championship	Bledisloe Cup
2024-09-28	New Zealand	13	33	Wellington Regional Stadium	(New Zealand) Wellington	New Zealand	Match Details	2024 Rugby Championship	Bledisloe Cup
2024-11-09	England	42	37	Twickenham	(England) London	Australia	Match Details	2024 Australia tour (Grand Slam)	Ella–Mobbs Trophy
2024-11-17	Wales	52	20	Millennium Stadium	(Wales) Cardiff	Australia	Match Details	2024 Australia tour (Grand Slam)	James Bevan Trophy
2024-11-24	Scotland	13	27	Murrayfield Stadium	(Scotland) Edinburgh	Scotland	Match Details	2024 Australia tour (Grand Slam)	Hopetoun Cup
2024-11-30	Ireland	19	22	Aviva Stadium	(Ireland) Dublin	Ireland	Match Details	2024 Australia tour (Grand Slam)	Lansdowne Cup
2025-07-06	Fiji	21	18	Newcastle International Sports Centre	(New South Wales) Newcastle	Australia	Match Details	2025 Winter International	Vuvale Bowl
2025-07-19	British & Irish Lions	19	27	Lang Park	(Queensland) Brisbane	British & Irish Lions	Match Details	2025 British & Irish Lions tour	Lions Series Trophy
2025-07-26	British & Irish Lions	26	29	Melbourne Cricket Ground	(Victoria (state)) Melbourne	British & Irish Lions	Match Details	2025 British & Irish Lions tour	Lions Series Trophy
2025-08-02	British & Irish Lions	22	12	Stadium Australia	(New South Wales) Sydney	Australia	Match Details	2025 British & Irish Lions tour	Lions Series Trophy
2025-08-16	South Africa	38	22	Ellis Park Stadium	(South Africa) Johannesburg	Australia	Match Details	2025 Rugby Championship	Mandela Challenge Plate
2025-08-23	South Africa	22	30	Cape Town Stadium	(South Africa) Cape Town	South Africa	Match Details	2025 Rugby Championship	Mandela Challenge Plate
2025-09-06	Argentina	28	24	North Queensland Stadium	(Queensland) Townsville	Australia	Match Details	2025 Rugby Championship	Puma Trophy
2025-09-13	Argentina	26	28	Sydney Football Stadium (2022)	(New South Wales) Sydney	Argentina	Match Details	2025 Rugby Championship	Puma Trophy
2025-09-27	New Zealand	24	33	Eden Park	(New Zealand) Auckland	New Zealand	Match Details	2025 Rugby Championship	Bledisloe Cup
2025-10-04	New Zealand	14	28	Perth Stadium	(Western Australia) Perth	New Zealand	Match Details	2025 Rugby Championship	Bledisloe Cup
2025-10-25	Japan	19	15	National Stadium	(Japan) Tokyo	Australia	Match Details	2025 Australia tour	
2025-11-1	England	7	25	Twickenham Stadium	(England) London	England	Match Details	2025 Australia tour	Ella–Mobbs Trophy
2025-11-8	Italy	19	26	Stadio Friuli	(Italy) Udine	Italy	Match Details	2025 Australia tour	
2025-11-15	Ireland	19	46	Aviva Stadium	(Ireland) Dublin	Ireland	Match Details	2025 Australia tour	Lansdowne Cup
2025-11-22	France	33	48	Stade de France	(France) Paris	France	Match Details	2025 Australia tour	Trophée des Bicentenaires
2026-07-04	Ireland	31	33	Sydney Football Stadium	(New South Wales) Sydney	Ireland	Match Details	2026 Nations Championship	Lansdowne Cup
2026-07-11	France	42	26	Lang Park	(Queensland) Brisbane	France	Match Details	2026 Nations Championship	Trophée des Bicentenaires
2026-07-18	Italy	57	10	Perth Rectangular Stadium	(Western Australia) Perth	Australia	Match Details	2026 Nations Championship	
2026-08-08	Japan	35	32	Hanazono Rugby Stadium	(Japan) Higashiōsaka	Australia	Match Details	Australia–Japan Test series	
2026-08-15	Japan	56	17	North Queensland Stadium	(Queensland) Townsville	Australia	Match Details	Australia–Japan Test series	
2026-08-29	Argentina	27	21	Estadio 23 de Agosto	(Argentina) Jujuy	Australia	Match Details	2026 Argentina tour	Puma Trophy
2026-09-05	Argentina	28	28	Estadio Malvinas Argentinas	(Argentina) Mendoza	Drawn	Match Details	2026 Argentina tour	Puma Trophy
2026-09-27	South Africa	42	38	Perth Stadium	(Western Australia) Perth	Australia	Match Details	2026 International	Mandela Challenge Plate
2026-10-10	New Zealand	19	50	Eden Park	(New Zealand) Auckland	New Zealand	Match Details	2026 Bledisloe Cup	Bledisloe Cup
2026-10-17	New Zealand	21	43	Stadium Australia	(New South Wales) Sydney	New Zealand	Match Details	2026 Bledisloe Cup	Bledisloe Cup
2026-11-08	England	22	45	Twickenham Stadium	(England) London	England	Match Details	2026 Nations Championship	Ella–Mobbs Trophy
2026-11-15	Scotland	12	15	Murrayfield Stadium	(Scotland) Edinburgh	Scotland	Match Details	2026 Nations Championship	Hopetoun Cup
2026-11-21	Wales			Millennium Stadium	(Wales) Cardiff	TBD		2026 Nations Championship	James Bevan Trophy
2026-11-27/28/29	TBD			Twickenham Stadium	(England) London	TBD		2026 Nations Championship	
Confirmed Tests (2027)
2027-04-25	New Zealand			Lang Park	Queensland	TBD		2027 Anzac Test	Bledisloe Cup
2027-07-10	Argentina			Sydney Football Stadium (2022)	(New South Wales) Sydney	TBD		2027 Rugby Championship	Puma Trophy
2027-07-17	Argentina			North Queensland Stadium	(Queensland) Townsville	TBD		2027 Rugby Championship	Puma Trophy
2027-07-31	New Zealand			Melbourne Cricket Ground	(Victoria (state)) Melbourne	TBD		2027 Rugby Championship	Bledisloe Cup
2027	New Zealand			TBD	(New Zealand) TBD	TBD		2027 Rugby Championship	Bledisloe Cup
2027	South Africa			TBD	(South Africa) TBD	TBD		2027 Rugby Championship	Mandela Challenge Plate
2027	South Africa			TBD	(South Africa) TBD	TBD		2027 Rugby Championship	Mandela Challenge Plate
2027-09-18	Ireland			Canberra Stadium	(Australian Capital Territory) Canberra	TBD		2027 Rugby World Cup warm-up match	Lansdowne Cup
2027-10-01	Hong Kong			Perth Stadium	(Western Australia) Perth	TBD		2027 Rugby World Cup	
2027-10-09	New Zealand			Stadium Australia	(New South Wales) Sydney	TBD		2027 Rugby World Cup	
2027-10-16	Chile			Lang Park	(Queensland) Brisbane	TBD		2027 Rugby World Cup	

== See also ==
- List of Australia national rugby union team records
