= Hopetoun Cup =

Rugby union trophy

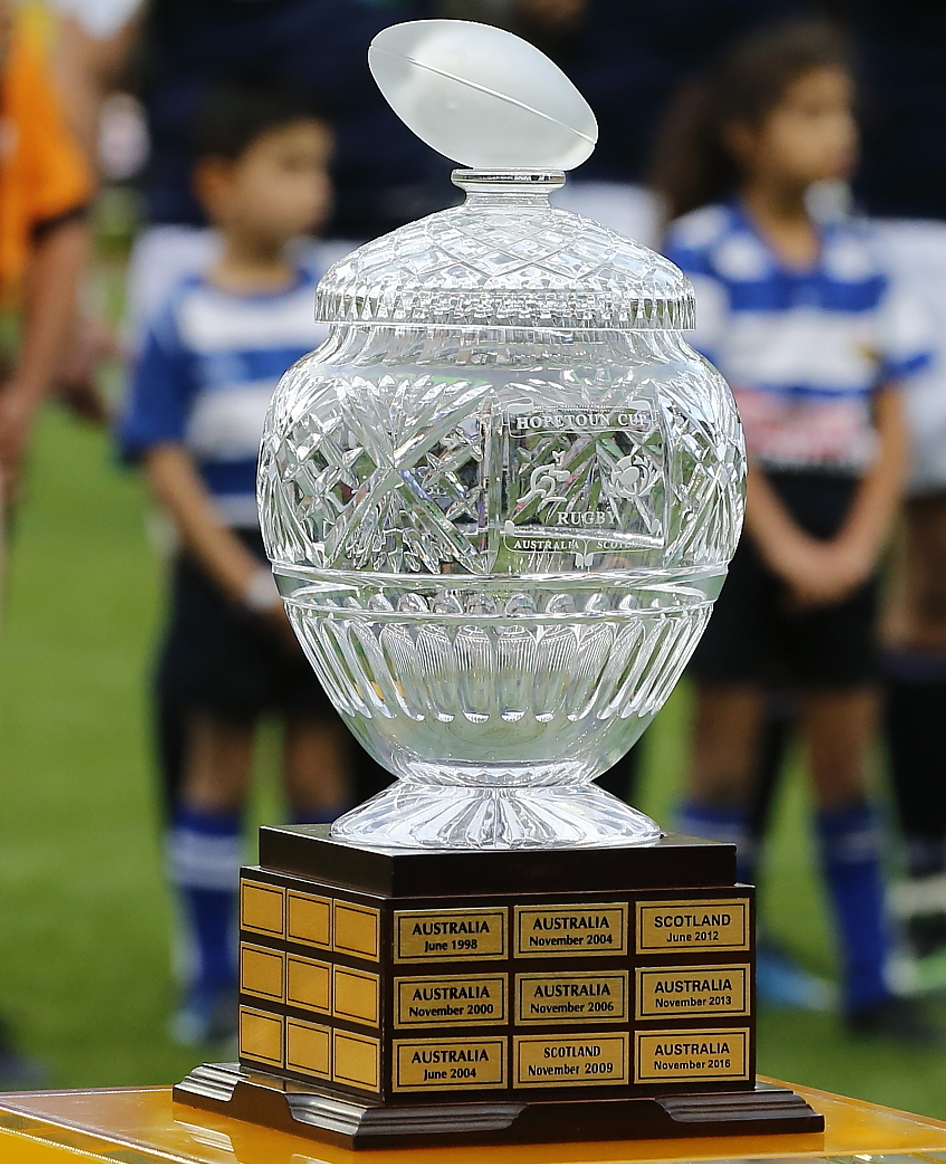
- Sport: Rugby union
- Instituted: 1998; 28 years ago
- Number of teams: 2
- Country: Australia; Scotland
- Holders: Scotland (2026)
- Most titles: Australia (8 titles)

The Hopetoun Cup is a rugby union trophy contested between Australia and Scotland. Established in 1998, the award is a link between the two countries and is named after John Hope, 7th Earl of Hopetoun (1860–1908). Hope, a Scotsman, was the former Governor-General of Australia and presided over the Federation of Australia in 1901. Like the Ella–Mobbs Trophy (formerly known as the Cook Cup after Captain James Cook), the Hopetoun Cup is crystal and was designed by Royal Doulton in London. Of the trophies contested between Australia and their British Isles counterparts, the Hopetoun Cup is the second-oldest, being established the following year to the Cook Cup (Australia–England).

Scotland are the current holders, winning the Hopetoun Cup for the seventh time in 2026, and have won 5 out of the last 6 encounters. Scotland won back-to-back 19–24 in Sydney, 53–24 in Edinburgh in 2017, and Edinburgh again 15–13 in 2021. Australia have recorded 8 wins since inception including a 5 win streak from 1998 to 2006, contributing to holding the cup for the majority of its existence. In 2009 and 2012, Scotland recorded back-to-back wins to hold the cup for four years.

== Matches ==
Details	Total	Australia	Scotland	Drawn	Australia points	Scotland points
Matches in Australia	6	4	2	0	172	75
Matches in Scotland	11	4	5	0	253	199
Details	17	8	7	0	425	274

== Results ==
- ST – Mid-year rugby union internationals
- AI – End-of-year rugby union internationals

Year	Date	Venue	Home	Score	Away	Trophy Winner
1998	13 June	Sydney Football Stadium, Sydney	Australia	45–3	Scotland	Australia
1998	20 June	Lang Park, Brisbane	Australia	33–11	Scotland	Australia
2000	11 November	Murrayfield, Edinburgh	Scotland	9–30	Australia	Australia
2004	13 June	Docklands Stadium, Melbourne	Australia	35–15	Scotland	Australia
2004	19 June	Stadium Australia, Sydney	Australia	34–13	Scotland	Australia
2004	6 November	Murrayfield, Edinburgh	Scotland	14–31	Australia	Australia
2004	20 November	Hampden Park, Glasgow	Scotland	17–31	Australia	Australia
2006	25 November	Murrayfield, Edinburgh	Scotland	15–44	Australia	Australia
2009	21 November	Murrayfield, Edinburgh	Scotland	9–8	Australia	Scotland
2012	5 June	Hunter Stadium, Newcastle	Australia	6–9	Scotland	Scotland
2013	23 November	Murrayfield, Edinburgh	Scotland	15–21	Australia	Australia
2016	12 November	Murrayfield, Edinburgh	Scotland	22–23	Australia	Australia
2017	17 June	Sydney Football Stadium, Sydney	Australia	19–24	Scotland	Scotland
2017	25 November	Murrayfield, Edinburgh	Scotland	53–24	Australia	Scotland
2021	7 November	Murrayfield, Edinburgh	Scotland	15–13	Australia	Scotland
2022	29 October	Murrayfield, Edinburgh	Scotland	15–16	Australia	Australia
2024	24 November	Murrayfield, Edinburgh	Scotland	27–13	Australia	Scotland
2026	15 November	Murrayfield, Edinburgh	Scotland	15–12	Australia	Scotland

== See also ==
- History of rugby union matches between Australia and Scotland
- Lansdowne Cup
