= Rugby union internationals =

Rugby union internationals may refer to:

- End-of-year rugby union internationals, played around the month of November
- Mid-year rugby union internationals, played around the month of June
