= James Bevan Trophy =

Rugby union trophy

- Sport: Rugby union
- Instituted: 2007; 19 years ago
- Number of teams: 2
- Country: Australia; Wales
- Holders: Australia (2024)
- Most titles: Australia (13 titles)

The James Bevan Trophy is a rugby union trophy which was created in 2007, and named after James Bevan, the Welsh Australian who was the first ever captain of the Wales rugby union team in 1881. The trophy was established after a decision on 10 May 2007 by the Welsh and Australian rugby unions to celebrate the 100 years of test rugby between the two sides. Australia are the current holders.

The Trophy was commissioned by International Business Wales (IBW), the economic arm of the Welsh assembly government.

== Trophy history ==
Australia snatched victory in the inaugural James Bevan Trophy test match 29–23 with a last minute try on Saturday 26 May 2007 at the Telstra Stadium in Sydney. They followed this up with a whitewash 31–0 victory at the Suncorp Stadium in Brisbane.

Wales captured the trophy the following year in 2008 with a 21–18 victory in Cardiff, but since then it has remained in Australian hands. Three victories in Cardiff in 2009–11 were followed up by a 3–0 series win in Australia in 2012, all by narrow margins. In the return match in Cardiff, Australia once again won with a last minute try.

The 2011 Rugby World Cup brought Australia and Wales together again for a third place play-off and once again it was a close finish with Australia claiming third place in a reversal of the first World Cup in 1987 when Wales won the play-off 22–21.

In three trophy matches Wales were leading, only for Australia to score the winning points in the 80th, 74th and 79th minute. Wales ended a run of thirteen consecutive defeats against Australia on 10 November 2018, narrowly winning 9-6. On 20 November 2021 they retained the trophy with a 29-28 victory.

== Matches ==
Details	Total	Australia	Wales	Drawn	Australia points	Wales points
Matches in Australia	7	7	0	0	193	128
Matches in Wales	13	10	3	0	363	254
Details	20	17	3	0	556	382

== Results ==
- ST – Mid-year rugby union internationals
- AI – End-of-year rugby union internationals

Year	Date	Venue	Home	Score	Away	Trophy Winner
2007	26 May	Stadium Australia, Sydney	Australia	29–23	Wales	Australia
2007	2 June	Lang Park, Brisbane	Australia	31–0	Wales	Australia
2008	29 November	Millennium Stadium, Cardiff	Wales	21–18	Australia	Wales
2009	28 November	Millennium Stadium, Cardiff	Wales	12–33	Australia	Australia
2010	6 November	Millennium Stadium, Cardiff	Wales	16–25	Australia	Australia
2011	3 December	Millennium Stadium, Cardiff	Wales	18–24	Australia	Australia
2012	9 June	Lang Park, Brisbane	Australia	27–19	Wales	Australia
2012	16 June	Docklands Stadium, Melbourne	Australia	25–23	Wales	Australia
2012	23 June	Sydney Football Stadium, Sydney	Australia	20–19	Wales	Australia
2012	1 December	Millennium Stadium, Cardiff	Wales	12–14	Australia	Australia
2013	30 November	Millennium Stadium, Cardiff	Wales	26–30	Australia	Australia
2014	8 November	Millennium Stadium, Cardiff	Wales	28–33	Australia	Australia
2017	11 November	Millennium Stadium, Cardiff	Wales	21–29	Australia	Australia
2016	5 November	Millennium Stadium, Cardiff	Wales	8–32	Australia	Australia
2018	10 November	Millennium Stadium, Cardiff	Wales	9–6	Australia	Wales
2021	21 November	Millennium Stadium, Cardiff	Wales	29–28	Australia	Wales
2022	26 November	Millennium Stadium, Cardiff	Wales	34–39	Australia	Australia
2024	6 July	Sydney Football Stadium, Sydney	Australia	25–16	Wales	Australia
2024	13 July	Melbourne Rectangular Stadium, Melbourne	Australia	36–28	Wales	Australia
2024	17 November	Millennium Stadium, Cardiff	Wales	20–52	Australia	Australia
2026	21 November	Millennium Stadium, Cardiff	Wales	–	Australia	

== See also ==
- History of rugby union matches between Australia and Wales
