= Trophée des Bicentenaires =

Rugby competition

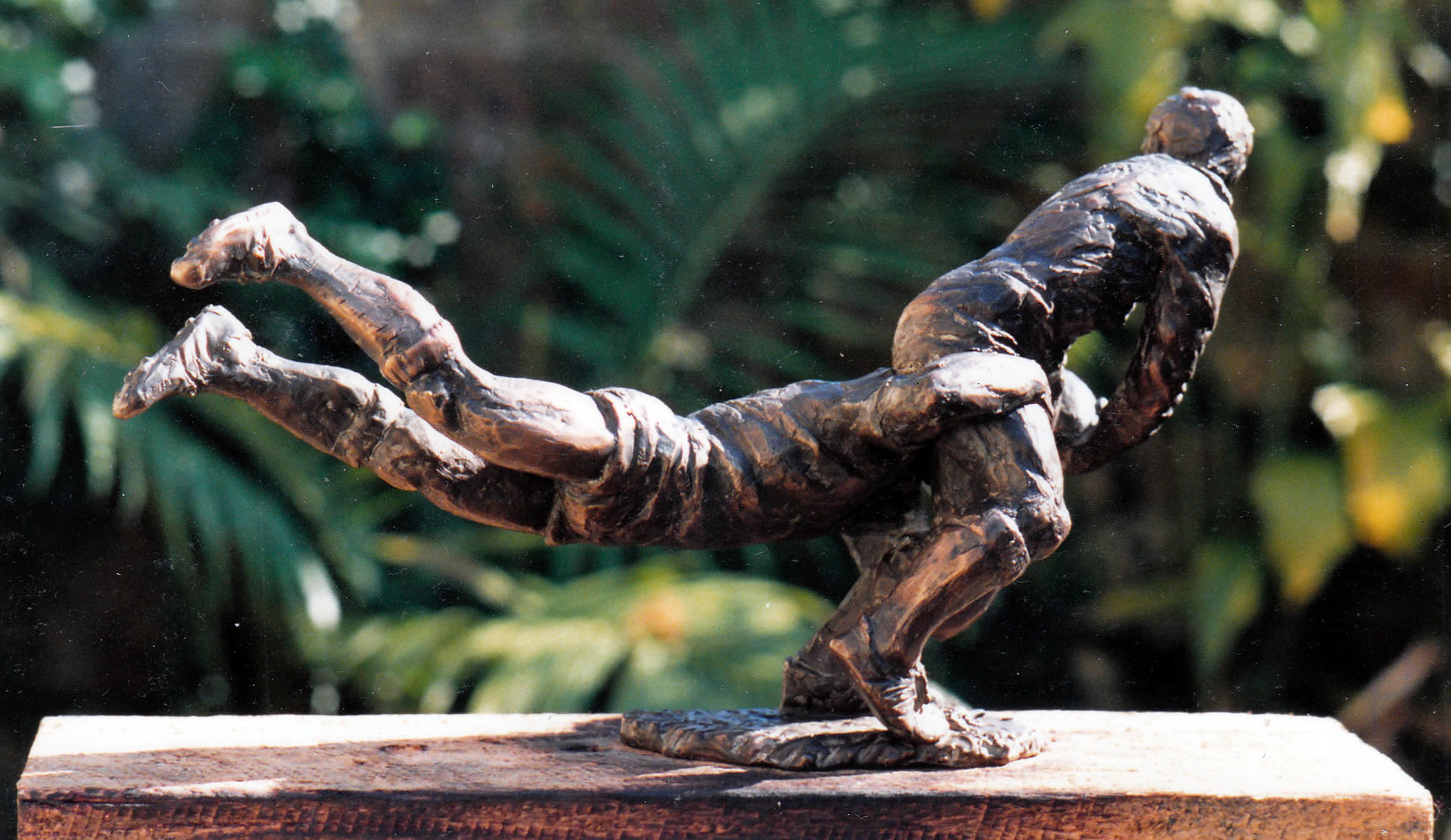
- The bronze Trophée des Bicentenaires was made by the Australian sculptor Diana Webber.
- Sport: Rugby union
- Instituted: 1989; 37 years ago
- Number of teams: 2
- Country: Australia; France
- Holders: France (2026)
- Most titles: Australia (14 titles)

The Trophée des Bicentenaires ([tʁɔ.fe de bi.sɑ̃t.nɛʁ]; "Trophy of the Bicentenaries") is a rugby union trophy contested between Australia and France. It was created in 1989 to commemorate the bi-centenaries of the British First Fleet to Australia and the French Revolution in 1988 and 1989 respectively. The trophy was donated by the Fédération Française de Rugby (FFR).

== Results ==
- MY – Mid-year rugby union internationals
- EY – End-of-year rugby union internationals

Year	Date	Venue	Home	Score	Away	Trophy Winner
1989	4 November	Stade de la Meinau, Strasbourg	France	15–32	Australia	Draw
1989	11 November	Stadium Lille-Métropole, Villeneuve-d'Ascq	France	25–19	Australia	Draw
1990	9 June	Sydney Football Stadium, Sydney	Australia	21–9	France	Australia
1990	24 June	Ballymore, Brisbane	Australia	48–31	France	Australia
1990	30 June	Sydney Football Stadium, Sydney	Australia	19–28	France	Australia
1993	30 October	Parc Lescure, Bordeaux	France	16–13	Australia	Australia
1993	6 November	Parc des Princes, Paris	France	3–24	Australia	Australia
1997	21 June	Sydney Football Stadium, Sydney	Australia	29–15	France	Australia
1997	28 June	Ballymore, Brisbane	Australia	26–19	France	Australia
1998	21 November	Stade de France, Paris	France	21–32	Australia	Australia
2000	4 November	Stade de France, Paris	France	13–18	Australia	Australia
2001	17 November	Stade Vélodrome, Marseille	France	14–13	Australia	France
2002	22 June	Docklands Stadium, Melbourne	Australia	29–17	France	Australia
2002	29 June	Stadium Australia, Sydney	Australia	31–25	France	Australia
2004	13 November	Stade de France, Paris	France	27–14	Australia	France
2005	2 July	Lang Park, Brisbane	Australia	37–31	France	Australia
2005	5 November	Stade Vélodrome, Marseille	France	26–16	Australia	France
2008	28 June	Stadium Australia, Sydney	Australia	34–13	France	Australia
2008	5 July	Lang Park, Brisbane	Australia	40–10	France	Australia
2008	22 November	Stade de France, Paris	France	13–18	Australia	Australia
2009	27 June	Stade de France, Paris	Australia	22–6	France	Australia
2010	27 November	Stade de France, Paris	France	16–59	Australia	Australia
2012	10 November	Stade de France, Paris	France	33–6	Australia	France
2014	7 June	Lang Park, Brisbane	Australia	50–23	France	Australia
2014	14 June	Docklands Stadium, Melbourne	Australia	6–0	France	Australia
2014	21 June	Sydney Football Stadium, Sydney	Australia	39–13	France	Australia
2014	15 November	Stade de France, Paris	France	29–26	Australia	France
2016	19 November	Stade de France, Paris	France	23–25	Australia	Australia
2021	7 July	Lang Park, Brisbane	Australia	23–21	France	Australia
2021	13 July	Melbourne Rectangular Stadium, Melbourne	Australia	26–28	France	Australia
2021	17 July	Lang Park, Brisbane	Australia	33–30	France	Australia
2022	5 November	Stade de France, Paris	France	30–29	Australia	France
2023	27 August	Stade de France, Paris	France	41–17	Australia	France
2025	22 November	Stade de France, Paris	France	48–33	Australia	France
2026	11 July	Lang Park, Brisbane	Australia	26–42	France	France

== See also ==
- Dave Gallaher Trophy – rugby union trophy contested between France and New Zealand
