= Test match (rugby union) =

International match in rugby union

A test match in rugby union is an international match, usually played between two senior national teams, that is recognised as such by at least one of the teams' national governing bodies.

Some teams do not represent a single country but their international games are still considered test matches (for example the British and Irish Lions). Likewise some countries award caps for games between their full national teams and some invitation teams such as the Barbarians.

== History ==
The first men's international game of rugby football – between Scotland and England – was played at Raeburn Place, Edinburgh, the home ground of Edinburgh Academicals, on 27 March 1871. (This was six years before the first cricket test match, one year before the first association football international and 24 years before the first field hockey international.)

The first recorded use of the word in relation to sport occurs in 1861 when it was used, especially by journalists, to designate the most important (but at that stage non-international) games played as part of a cricket tour by an unofficial English team to Australia and it is thought to arise from the idea that the matches were a "test of strength and competency" between the sides involved. When official and fully representative Australian and English cricket and rugby teams began touring each other's countries a decade or so later the term gradually began to be applied by journalists exclusively to the international fixtures on each tour, though this was not widespread until well into the 1880s.

== Recognising official test status ==
Unlike in cricket, whose governing body, the International Cricket Council, tightly controls the application of Test match status, World Rugby's regulations do not define a "test match". They define an "international match" as "a Match played between National Representative Teams selected by Unions". In rugby union, test match status and caps may be awarded by either team's governing body regardless of the decision of their opponents.

Although both teams' governing bodies do not need to recognise the match as a test match for caps to be awarded, it is rare that they should disagree. The only existing example remaining in men's rugby involving two top-tier nations concerns games played by the New South Wales Waratahs against the New Zealand All Blacks in the 1920s. As there was very little rugby union played in Australia outside of New South Wales, the Australian Rugby Union retroactively awarded caps to the players from the 1920s Waratahs that played against the All Blacks, however the New Zealand Rugby Union has not done the same for All Blacks that played in those matches.

Differences in recognition now almost always involve matches between the senior national team of a nation outside the traditional top tier and an official developmental side of a top-tier nation. Depending on the policy of the lower-tier union, these matches may or may not be fully capped for that national team. For example, before a change in policy by USA Rugby after the 2008 Churchill Cup, it awarded full national caps when its senior national team played developmental sides, such as England Saxons, Ireland Wolfhounds, Scotland A, Argentina A and the Junior All Blacks.

However, in women's rugby matters are less clear. The first women's "test" took place in 1982 between the Netherlands and France, but the sport was not widely accepted or recognised by many existing national Unions or the International Rugby Board for many years, nor had it attracted significant media interest. Some unions do not officially recognise any tests played before they became responsible for the women's game – for example the French Union (FFR) does not list any games before 1989, and the IRB did not (until recently) recognise the first two women's World Cups.

== See also ==
- History of rugby union: First international game
- List of rugby union terms
- Mid-year rugby union internationals
- Autumn rugby union internationals
- Women's international rugby union
