= Lansdowne Cup =

Rugby union trophy

- Sport: Rugby union
- Instituted: 1999; 27 years ago
- Number of teams: 2
- Country: Australia; Ireland
- Holders: Ireland (2026)
- Most titles: Ireland (9 titles)

The Lansdowne Cup is a rugby union trophy competed for by Australia and Ireland. Established in 1999, the cup was donated to the Australian Rugby Union by the Lansdowne Club of Sydney. The cup was launched in advance of the two Test matches played during the 1999 Ireland rugby union tour of Australia. The crystal trophy, made by Ireland's Waterford Crystal, for which the two nations compete was unveiled at a pub in Brisbane on 9 June 1999. Ireland has won the Cup nine times compared to Australia's eight victories. Since the inception of the Cup, Ireland has won ten Cup fixtures compared to Australia's nine test victories. Ireland are the current holders, winning in 2026 for the sixth time in succession.

== History ==
The inaugural contest for the Lansdowne Cup was a two-Test series played between Australia and Ireland in 1999, during the Irish tour of Australia. Ireland are the current holders of the trophy following their 2025 autumn internationals victory.

== Matches ==
Details	Total	Australia	Ireland	Drawn	Australia points	Ireland points
Matches in Australia	10	7	3	0	286	182
Matches in Ireland	10	2	7	1	192	222
Details	20	9	10	1	478	404

== Results ==
- ST – Mid-year rugby union internationals
- AI – End-of-year rugby union internationals

Year	Date	Venue	Home	Score	Away	Trophy Winner
1999	12 June	Lang Park, Brisbane	Australia	46–10	Ireland	Australia
1999	19 June	Subiaco Oval, Perth	Australia	32–26	Ireland	Australia
2002	9 November	Lansdowne Road, Dublin	Ireland	18–9	Australia	Ireland
2003	7 June	Subiaco Oval, Perth	Australia	45–16	Ireland	Australia
2005	19 November	Lansdowne Road, Dublin	Ireland	14–30	Australia	Australia
2006	24 June	Subiaco Oval, Perth	Australia	37–15	Ireland	Australia
2006	19 November	Lansdowne Road, Dublin	Ireland	21–6	Australia	Ireland
2008	14 June	Docklands Stadium, Melbourne	Australia	18–12	Ireland	Australia
2009	15 November	Croke Park, Dublin	Ireland	20–20	Australia	Australia
2010	26 June	Lang Park, Brisbane	Australia	22–15	Ireland	Australia
2013	16 November	Aviva Stadium, Dublin	Ireland	15–32	Australia	Australia
2014	22 November	Aviva Stadium, Dublin	Ireland	26–23	Australia	Ireland
2016	26 November	Aviva Stadium, Dublin	Ireland	27–24	Australia	Ireland
2018	9 June	Lang Park, Brisbane	Australia	18–9	Ireland	Ireland
2018	16 June	Melbourne Rectangular Stadium, Melbourne	Australia	21–26	Ireland	Ireland
2018	23 June	Sydney Football Stadium, Sydney	Australia	16–20	Ireland	Ireland
2022	19 November	Aviva Stadium, Dublin	Ireland	13–10	Australia	Ireland
2024	30 November	Aviva Stadium, Dublin	Ireland	22–19	Australia	Ireland
2025	15 November	Aviva Stadium, Dublin	Ireland	46–19	Australia	Ireland
2026	4 July	Sydney Football Stadium, Sydney	Australia	31–33	Ireland	Ireland

== See also ==
- History of rugby union matches between Australia and Ireland
