= Ella–Mobbs Trophy =

Rugby union trophy

- Sport: Rugby union
- Awarded for: Winner of Australia–England fixture (Note: The trophy is awarded to the winner of the England–Australia fixture played either as a one-off fixture or a test series outside of the Rugby World Cup)
- Location: Australia; England
- Country: Australia; England

History
- First award: 12 July 1997; 29 years, 132 days ago (Note: Originally named "Cook Cup", changed to "Ella–Mobbs Trophy" in 2022.)
- Editions: 28 (Note: 33 test matches played during the "Cook Cup" and "Ella–Mobbs Trophy" era and 10 matches was part of a test series in 2006, 2010, 2016 and 2022.)
- First winner: Australia (12 July 1997)
- Most wins: England (16)
- Most recent: England (2026)

The Ella–Mobbs Cup (formerly the Cook Cup from 1997 to 2021) is a rugby union trophy contested between Australia and England.

The Cook Cup was established in 1997 when the Wallabies and England contracted to play each other bi-annually for a decade, playing matches on a home and away basis. Since the first two years the format has only been adhered to once (in 2004, even though respectively in 2010 and 2016 there was a Test Series in Australia and an Autumn International in England), World Cup matches are not counted. The cup was named after Captain James Cook, representing an English–Australian connection. The cup, which was designed by Royal Doulton in London, is made from crystal.

In 2022, ahead of England's 3-test series tour to Australia, the Cook Cup was retired in favour of a new trophy that better represented both countries. The "Ella–Mobbs Cup" was named after Indigenous 25-cap Wallabies great Mark Ella and English war hero Edgar Mobbs, who played nine Tests for England before being killed on the World War I western front in 1917.

The Cup reflected intricate details of the heritages from Mark Ella and Edgar Mobbs. Designed by aboriginal artist Natalie Bateman, the trophy incorporates mullet, song lines and indigenous battle symbols for Mark Ella, while Edgar Mobbs is represented with the English rose, a fox, footsteps and the Northampton castle symbol he wore on his lapel in battle. The wood at the base of the trophy was sourced from Ella's home nation, in the shape of an abalone shell, and also English Oak, sourced to represent Edgar Mobbs' homeland.

The Cup itself was made of plated silver and was first contested by the series winners of the England v Wallabies series in 2022.

== History ==
=== Pre-Cook Cup ===
The first test between England and Australia was played on 9 January 1909 at Blackheath's Rectory Field in England The Wallabies won the match 9–3. The two nations next met in 1928, at Twickenham, and England won 18–11. Twenty years passed and England and Australia met again at Twickenham in 1948, with Australia winning the affair 11–0. It would then be another decade until the two nations played another test against one another. In 1958, they met again at Twickenham, and England won 9–6.

England and Australia played each other twice during the 1960s, with the first match in Australia in 1963. The Wallabies defeated England 18–9 at Sydney's Sports Ground, and again in 1967 by 11–23 at Twickenham. The nations played each other another four times during the 1970s; with the home team always victorious. England won 20–3 at Twickenham in 1973, Australia won both of the 1975 tour matches 16–9 at the Sydney Cricket Ground and 30–21 at Ballymore Stadium, Brisbane, then England won 23–6 in 1976 at Twickenham.

The two nations would meet six times during the 1980s, the first encounter being in 1982, with England defeating Australia 15–11 at Twickenham. Two years later the Wallabies broke the trend when the magnificent Grand Slam team of 1984 won away from home at Twickenham by 19–3. They were drawn against each other in the 1987 World Cup at Sydney's Concord Oval, with Australia winning 19–6. The nations played 3 times in 1988, with Australia winning at home 22–16 at Ballymore and 28–8 at Concord Oval, and England winning 28–19 at Twickenham.

The sides met three times during the 1990s before the Cook Cup was introduced. The first match was in 1991 at the Sydney Football Stadium, and Australia won 40–15. Later that year, Australia won the final of the 1991 Rugby World Cup 12–6 at Twickenham. The last pre-Cook Cup match was a quarter-final of the 1995 Rugby World Cup played at Newlands Stadium in Cape Town, South Africa. England dramatically won 25–22 with the last kick of the match.

=== Cook Cup period history ===
The first Cook Cup match was played at Sydney Football Stadium on 25 June 1997. Australia won the match 25–6. The series was decided through two tests, and with the second match at Twickenham resulting in a 15–15 draw, Australia were crowned champions.

In 1998, Australia ran out record 76–0 winners at Lang Park in Brisbane, playing a severely depleted England side. The Wallabies were captained by John Eales and scored 11 tries. The subsequent meeting at Twickenham in December was a much closer affair, with Australia winning 12–11 thanks to a late Eales penalty. In June 1999, Australia retained the trophy by beating England 22–15 at Stadium Australia.

In 2000, England won the Cook Cup for the first time, beating Australia 22–19 at Twickenham with an injury-time try by Dan Luger. In each of the next two years, the Cup was also decided in a single match at Twickenham, with England winning 21–15 in 2001 and 32–31 in 2002.

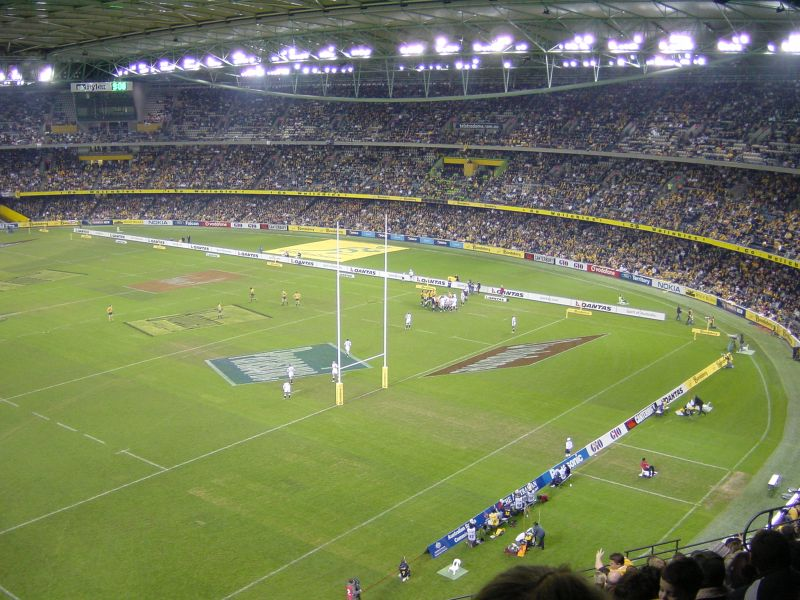
The 2006 match between Australia and England at Telstra Dome

England retained the Cup in 2003 with a 25–14 victory at Melbourne's Telstra Dome – their first test victory over Australia in Australia. Later that year, although not part of the Cook Cup, the two nations met in what was one of their most famous encounters, the 2003 Rugby World Cup Final at Stadium Australia, Sydney. Jonny Wilkinson landed a drop goal in extra time that saw England win 20–17 to claim their first Rugby World Cup.

The 2004 Cook Cup was contested over two matches, Australia winning 51–15 at Brisbane in June and 21–19 at Twickenham in November. England won the Cup back in 2005 with a 26–16 victory at Twickenham. In 2006, the teams played a two-match series in Australia, with the home team winning both games comfortably.

There was no Cook Cup in 2007, owing to the 2007 Rugby World Cup, although the teams did meet again in this competition. In 2008, Australia retained the Cook Cup by winning a single match at Twickenham 28–14. This match formed part of the Autumn test matches. They repeated the feat in 2009, this time with an 18–9 victory. There were three matches in 2010: first, the teams played a two-match series in Australia in June, winning one match apiece, and then a single test in London in November, which England won. No match was scheduled for 2011, which was a World Cup year.

In 2012, Australia reclaimed the trophy with a 20–14 victory in a one-off test at Twickenham. The result was viewed as something of a surprise, since Australia had come into the match following a 33–6 loss to France.

England regained the Cup in November 2013 with a 20–13 win at Twickenham, and retained it in 2014 with a 26–17 win. There was no Cook Cup match in 2015, although the two teams did meet in the Rugby World Cup in October. In June 2016, England retained the trophy by winning every encounter in a three-match series in Australia, the first-ever such series between the two countries. In December 2016, England retained the cup with a 37–21 victory. In November 2017, England retained the cup with a 30–6 win, and on 24 November 2018 England held onto the Cup with a 37–18 victory, and in doing so, set a longest winning streak of six matches in a row for rugby internationals between these two nations. As the 2015 and 2019 Rugby World Cup matches are not listed as part of the Cook Cup schedule, the Cook Cup is currently held by England, who have won 11 of the last 12 matches between 2013 and 2022.

The Ella–Mobbs Cup was contested during England's 3-test series against Australia in July 2022.

== Matches ==
Host	Matches	Won by Australia	Won by England	Draws	Australia points	England points
Australia	15	8	7	0	417	254
England	20	6	13	1	367	482
Overall	35	14	20	1	784	736

== Results ==
- MY – Mid-year rugby union internationals
- EY – End-of-year rugby union internationals

Year	Date	Venue	Home	Score	Away	Trophy winner	Trophy
1997	23 July	(New South Wales) Sydney Football Stadium, Sydney	Australia	25–6	England	Australia	Cook Cup
1997	15 November	(England) Twickenham, London	England	15–15	Australia	Australia	Cook Cup
1998	6 June	(Queensland) Lang Park, Brisbane	Australia	76–0	England	Australia	Cook Cup
1998	28 November	(England) Twickenham, London	England	11–12	Australia	Australia	Cook Cup
1999	26 June	(New South Wales) Stadium Australia, Sydney	Australia	22–15	England	Australia	Cook Cup
2000	18 November	(England) Twickenham, London	England	22–19	Australia	England	Cook Cup
2001	10 November	(England) Twickenham, London	England	21–15	Australia	England	Cook Cup
2002	16 November	(England) Twickenham, London	England	32–31	Australia	England	Cook Cup
2003	21 June	(Victoria (state)) Docklands Stadium, Melbourne	Australia	14–25	England	England	Cook Cup
2004	26 June	(Queensland) Lang Park, Brisbane	Australia	51–15	England	Australia	Cook Cup
2004	27 November	(England) Twickenham, London	England	19–21	Australia	Australia	Cook Cup
2005	12 November	(England) Twickenham, London	England	26–16	Australia	England	Cook Cup
2006	11 June	(New South Wales) Stadium Australia, Sydney	Australia	34–3	England	Australia	Cook Cup
2006	17 June	(Victoria (state)) Docklands Stadium, Melbourne	Australia	43–18	England	Australia	Cook Cup
2008	15 November	(England) Twickenham, London	England	14–28	Australia	Australia	Cook Cup
2009	7 November	(England) Twickenham, London	England	9–18	Australia	Australia	Cook Cup
2010	12 June	(Western Australia) Subiaco Oval, Perth	Australia	27–17	England	Australia	Cook Cup
2010	19 June	(New South Wales) Stadium Australia, Sydney	Australia	20–21	England	Australia	Cook Cup
2010	13 November	(England) Twickenham, London	England	35–18	Australia	England	Cook Cup
2012	17 November	(England) Twickenham, London	England	14–20	Australia	Australia	Cook Cup
2013	2 November	(England) Twickenham, London	England	20–13	Australia	England	Cook Cup
2014	29 November	(England) Twickenham, London	England	26–17	Australia	England	Cook Cup
2016	11 June	(Queensland) Lang Park, Brisbane	Australia	28–39	England	England	Cook Cup
2016	18 June	(Victoria (state)) Melbourne Rectangular Stadium, Melbourne	Australia	7–23	England	England	Cook Cup
2016	25 June	(New South Wales) Sydney Football Stadium, Sydney	Australia	40–44	England	England	Cook Cup
2016	3 December	(England) Twickenham, London	England	37–21	Australia	England	Cook Cup
2017	18 November	(England) Twickenham, London	England	30–6	Australia	England	Cook Cup
2018	24 November	(England) Twickenham, London	England	37–18	Australia	England	Cook Cup
2021	13 November	(England) Twickenham, London	England	32–15	Australia	England	Cook Cup
2022	2 July	(Western Australia) Perth Stadium, Perth	Australia	30–28	England	England	Ella–Mobbs Trophy
2022	9 July	(Queensland) Lang Park, Brisbane	Australia	17–25	England	England	Ella–Mobbs Trophy
2022	16 July	(New South Wales) Sydney Cricket Ground, Sydney	Australia	17–21	England	England	Ella–Mobbs Trophy
2024	9 November	(England) Twickenham, London	England	37–42	Australia	Australia	Ella–Mobbs Trophy
2025	1 November	(England) Twickenham, London	England	25–7	Australia	England	Ella–Mobbs Trophy
2026	8 November	(England) Twickenham, London	England	45–22	Australia	England	Ella–Mobbs Trophy

=== Venues ===
As of 8 November 2025.

==== In Australia ====
Location	Stadium	Won by Australia	Won by England	Drawn
Sydney, New South Wales	Sydney Football Stadium	1	1	—N/a
Sydney, New South Wales	Stadium Australia	2	1	—N/a
Sydney, New South Wales	Sydney Cricket Ground	—N/a	1	—N/a
Brisbane, Queensland	Lang Park	2	2	—N/a
Melbourne, Victoria	Docklands Stadium	1	1	—N/a
Melbourne, Victoria	Melbourne Rectangular Stadium	—N/a	1	—N/a
Perth, Western Australia	Subiaco Oval	1	—N/a	—N/a
Perth, Western Australia	Perth Stadium	1	—N/a	—N/a
Overall		8	7	—N/a

==== In England ====
City/Region	Stadium	Won by England	Won by Australia	Drawn
London	Twickenham	13	6	1
Overall		13	6	1

== See also ==
- History of rugby union matches between Australia and England
- The Ashes
