= Mid-year rugby union internationals =

Rugby union matches played around July

- Current season or competition: 2026 mid-year rugby union tests
- Sport: Rugby union

The mid-year rugby union internationals, also known as the summer internationals in northern countries, are rugby union games contested by men's national teams during World Rugby's international window in July.

The window, originally in June, was created in 2008, though matches occurred around this time in earlier years. In 2020 World Rugby moved the window from June to July.

Matches in this window are held annually. In general Six Nations teams travel in this window. Usually, Second-tier national teams also have games.

British and Irish Lions tours occur in this window every four years on odd years without the Rugby World Cup.

From 2026, this international window will be used for the new Nations Championship on even years.

== See also ==
- End-of-year rugby union internationals
