= End-of-year rugby union internationals =

Men's rugby union test matches in November

- Current season or competition: 2025 end-of-year rugby union internationals
- Sport: Rugby union

The end-of-year rugby union internationals (also known as the autumn internationals in Six Nations countries and the spring internationals in SANZAAR countries) are rugby union games contested by men's national teams during World Rugby's international window in October and November.

Matches in this window are held annually except during the years of the Rugby World Cup. In general SANZAAR teams travel in this window. Usually, Second-tier national teams also have games.

Grand Slam tours can occur in this window. This is where a nation plays the four home unions of Britain and Ireland – England, Ireland, Scotland, and Wales.

Every four years, this window is extended and used for the Rugby World Cup.

From 2026, this international window will be used for the new Nations Championship on even years.

== See also ==
- Mid-year rugby union internationals
