= History of rugby union matches between Australia and Italy =

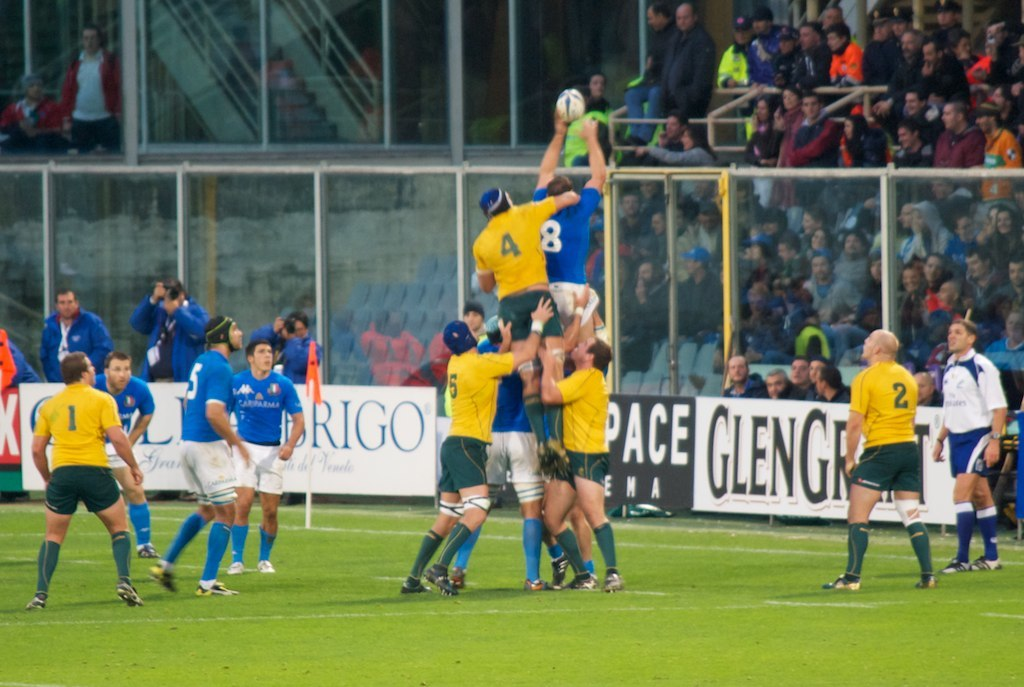
A line-out between Italy and Australia during their 2010 match.

Australia and Italy have played each other in full tests at rugby union a total of twenty-one matches, with the first eighteen won by Australia. Italy achieved their first victory in the fixture in the 2022 Autumn Internationals, some 39 years after the first match between the teams. Australia have met Italy once in Rugby World Cup play, winning 32–6 in Auckland in the 2011 Rugby World Cup. All other matches were Test Matches.

In addition, Australia beat Italy twice in non-Test matches prior to 1983, in games in which Italy gave caps, but Australia, appearing as Australia XV, did not.

== History ==
Australia first played Italy on their way home from European tours in the 1970s, though they were not given full international status. The first encounter was in 1973 when Australia ran up 59 points to 21, but the second was the closest ever, with Italy losing by a single point 16–17. Officially, the first test between the two countries was in 1983, following an Italian tour of Australia in 1981 in which the visitors acquitted themselves well against secondary opposition. They toured again in 1986 and played their first test match away from home. Two years later the Italians were soundly beaten at the end of the 1988 Wallabies tour, but their next tour of Australia in 1994 saw a big improvement with all state matches won and an unlucky defeat in the Brisbane test match. In 2011 they met for the first time in a World Cup match at the group stage in Auckland with Australia starting their campaign towards the semi-finals with a 32–6 win. A period of convincing wins to Australia followed, with Italy coming close in 2012, losing by only three points.

In November 2022 Italy won their first game against Australia 28–27 as part of the 2022 end-of-year rugby union internationals. Italy won their second consecutive game against Australia in the 2025 end-of-year rugby union internationals.

In July 2026, the two teams met in the inaugural edition of the 2026 Nations Championship, the first phase of which were played in the Southern Hemisphere and was known as the Southern Hemisphere Series. Australia hosted Italy in Perth, and won 57–10.

== Summary ==
Note: Summary below reflects test results by both teams.

=== Overall ===
Details	Played	Won by Australia	Won by Italy	Drawn	Australia points	Italy points
In Australia	8	8	0	0	313	123
In Italy	12	10	2	0	389	186
Neutral venue	1	1	0	0	32	6
Overall	21	19	2	0	734	315

=== Records ===
Note: Date shown in brackets indicates when the record was or last set.

Record	Australia	Italy
Longest winning streak	18 (22 October 1983 – 12 November 2022)	2 (12 November 2022 – 8 November 2025)
Largest points for
Home	69 (25 June 2005)	28 (12 November 2022)
Away	55 (3 December 1988)	27 (24 June 2017)
Largest winning margin
Home	48 (25 June 2005)	7 (8 November 2025)
Away	49 (3 December 1988)	—N/a

== Results ==
No.	Date	Venue	Score	Winner	Competition
1	22 October 1983	Stadio Comunale Mario Battaglini, Rovigo	7–29	Australia	1983 Australia tour of Italy and France
2	1 June 1986	Ballymore Stadium, Brisbane	39–18	Australia	1986 Italy tour of Australia
3	3 December 1988	Stadio Flaminio, Rome	6–55	Australia	1988 Australia tour of Great Britain and Italy
4	18 June 1994	Ballymore Stadium, Brisbane	23–20	Australia	1994 Italy tour of Australia
5	25 June 1994	Olympic Park Stadium, Melbourne	20–7	Australia	1994 Italy tour of Australia
6	23 October 1996	Stadio Plebiscito, Padua	18–40	Australia	1996 Australia tour of Great Britain, Ireland and Italy
7	23 November 2002	Stadio Luigi Ferraris, Genova	3–34	Australia	2002 Australia tour of Argentina and Europe
8	25 June 2005	Docklands Stadium, Melbourne	69–21	Australia	2005 Italy tour of Argentina and Australia
9	11 November 2006	Stadio Flaminio, Rome	18–25	Australia	2006 Australia tour of Great Britain, Ireland and Italy
10	8 November 2008	Stadio Euganeo, Padova	20–30	Australia	2008 Australia tour of Great Britain, France and Italy
11	13 June 2009	Canberra Stadium, Canberra	31–8	Australia	2009 Italy tour of Australia
12	20 June 2009	Docklands Stadium, Melbourne	34–12	Australia	2009 Italy tour of Australia
13	20 November 2010	Stadio Artemio Franchi, Florence	14–32	Australia	2010 Autumn International
14	11 September 2011	North Harbour Stadium, Auckland (New Zealand)	32–6	Australia	2011 Rugby World Cup
15	24 November 2012	Stadio Artemio Franchi, Florence	19–22	Australia	2012 Autumn International
16	9 November 2013	Stadio Olimpico di Torino, Turin	20–50	Australia	2013 Autumn International
17	24 June 2017	Lang Park, Brisbane	40–27	Australia	2017 Summer International
18	17 November 2018	Stadio Euganeo, Padova	7–26	Australia	2018 Autumn International
19	12 November 2022	Stadio Artemio Franchi, Florence	28–27	Italy	2022 Autumn International
20	8 November 2025	Stadio Friuli, Udine	26–19	Italy	2025 Autumn International
21	18 July 2026	Perth Rectangular Stadium, Perth	57–10	Australia	2026 Nations Championship

== XV Results ==
Below is a list of matches that Italy has awarded matches test match status by virtue of awarding caps, but Australia did not award caps.

Date	Venue	Score	Winner	Competition
21 November 1973	Stadio Tommaso Fattori, L'Aquila	21–59	Australia XV	1973 Australia tour of Great Britain and Italy
4 November 1976	Arena Civica, Milan	15–16	Australia XV	1976 Australia tour of France and Italy

== List of series ==
Played	Won by Australia	Won by Italy	Drawn
3	3	0	0

Year	Australia	Italy	Series winner
1986	1	0	Australia
1994	2	0	Australia
2009	2	0	Australia
