= 2011 in rugby union =

== International competitions ==
- June 10 – June 26: 2011 IRB Junior World Championship in Italy
  - (gold) New Zealand
  - (silver) England
  - (bronze) Australia
  - 4th: France
    - This was the fourth title for New Zealand.
- May 24 – June 5: 2011 IRB Junior World Rugby Trophy in Georgia
  - (gold) Samoa
  - (silver) Japan
  - (bronze) Georgia
  - 4th: Uruguay
    - This was the first title for Samoa, giving them a place in the 2012 IRB Junior World Rugby Trophy.
- 4 February – 19 March: Six Nations Championship
  - Winner: England national rugby union team, 26th title.
- 20 May: Amlin Challenge Cup final at Cardiff City Stadium, Cardiff
  - Harlequins claimed the title with a 19–18 win over Stade Français, becoming the first team to win the Challenge Cup three times.
- 21 May: Heineken Cup final at Millennium Stadium, Cardiff
  - Leinster won its second European title with a 33–22 win over Northampton Saints.
- 3 December 2010 - 29 May 2011: IRB Sevens World Series – New Zealand clinched the series title at the London Sevens on 22 May, with the Edinburgh Sevens remaining to be played.
  - (gold) New Zealand
  - (silver) South Africa
  - (bronze) England
  - 4th: Fiji
- 9 July: Super Rugby final at Suncorp Stadium, Brisbane
  - The Reds claimed their first title in the competition's professional era with an 18–13 win over the Crusaders.
- 23 July–27 August: Tri Nations Series
  - Australia won its third title. This was the final edition of the tournament under the "Tri Nations" name; with the 2012 entry of Argentina, the competition was renamed as The Rugby Championship.
- 9 September–23 October: 2011 Rugby World Cup in New Zealand
  - The tournament was won by New Zealand's All Blacks defeating France in the final by a score of 8–7. Australia national rugby union team defeat Wales to claim third.
- December 10–16 2011 Cup of Nations (rugby union) in Dubai

Domestic competitions

- English Premiership – Final, 28 May at Twickenham: Leicester Tigers vs. Saracens
  - Saracens defeated Leicester Tigers 22–18 for their first-ever Premiership title.
- RFU Championship — Worcester Warriors. As the only side among the semi-finalists that met the requirements for promotion, they replaced Leeds Carnegie in the 2011–12 Premiership.
- Top 14 – Final, 4 June at Stade de France: Toulouse vs. Montpellier
  - Toulouse won 15–10 and lifted the Bouclier de Brennus for the 18th time.
- Rugby Pro D2 — Lyon won the championship and automatic promotion to the Top 14. Bordeaux Bègles won the promotion playoffs. The two clubs will replace La Rochelle and Bourgoin.
- Celtic League – Grand Final, 28 May in Limerick:
  - In an all-Irish affair, Munster won their third title against Leinster 19–9.
- LV Cup (Anglo-Welsh Cup) – Gloucester
- ITM Cup:
  - Premiership – Final, 3 September in Hamilton: Waikato vs. Canterbury
    - Canterbury won 12−3 for their fourth consecutive title in the Air New Zealand/ITM Cup and ninth in the history of New Zealand provincial rugby.
  - Championship: Final, 4 September in Palmerston North: Manawatu vs. Hawke's Bay
    - Hawke's Bay won 35−30 and replaced Southland in the 2012 ITM Cup Premiership.
- Currie Cup: Final, 29 October in Johannesburg: Golden Lions vs. Sharks
  - The Lions won 42–16 in the most one-sided Currie Cup final since 1980.

Other major events

- 26 February: During the England–France match in the Six Nations, England's Jonny Wilkinson retakes the all-time lead for career Test points from New Zealand's Dan Carter.
- 27 February: During the Scotland–Ireland match in the Six Nations, Ireland's Ronan O'Gara retakes the all-time lead for career points in the Championship from Wilkinson.
- 19 March: During the Ireland–England Six Nations match, two Irish players reach major career milestones in the Championship:
  - Brian O'Driscoll takes over the all-time lead for career tries in the Championship with his 25th try, breaking the record of Scotland's Ian Smith that had lasted since 1933.
  - Ronan O'Gara makes his 56th appearance in the Championship, drawing level with countryman Mike Gibson for the Championship record.
- 30 July: During New Zealand's Tri Nations opener at home to South Africa, Carter reclaims the all-time lead for career Test points from Wilkinson.
- 3 December: Shane Williams plays his last international match for Wales. In the match against Australia he scores his 58th try.
- December: Owen Sheers is appointed to be writer in residence at the WRU. This seems to be the first such appointment by any national rugby body.
- IRB Hall of Fame Class of 2011:
  - 19 March: Serge Blanco, André Boniface, Guy Boniface, Lucien Mias, and Jean Prat, all France (ceremony held in Paris)
  - 28 April: Alan Rotherham and Harry Vassall, England (ceremony held at the annual dinner of Oxford University RFC in Oxford)
  - 6 May: Frank Hancock and Cardiff RFC, Wales (ceremony held at the club museum in Cardiff)
  - 10 May: Mike Gibson, Ireland (ceremony held at the annual Ulster Rugby awards banquet in Belfast)
  - 29 May: Barbarian F.C. and William Percy Carpmael, England (ceremony held at halftime of the match between the Barbarians and England at Twickenham)
  - 24 October: Nineteen figures were inducted into the Hall at the IRB Awards banquet in Auckland, held the night after the Rugby World Cup final. This set of inductions was divided into the following categories:
    - Founders of the Rugby World Cup:
      - John Kendall-Carpenter, England
      - Richard Littlejohn, New Zealand
      - Nicholas Shehadie, Australia
      - Roger Vanderfield, Australia
    - Rugby World Cup-winning coaches through 2007:
      - Brian Lochore, New Zealand
      - Bob Dwyer, Australia
      - Kitch Christie, South Africa
      - Rod Macqueen, Australia
      - Clive Woodward, England
      - Jake White, South Africa
    - Rugby World Cup-winning captains through 2007 (John Eales, captain of the 1999 World Cup-winning Australia team, was not included as he had already been inducted):
      - David Kirk, New Zealand
      - Nick Farr-Jones, Australia
      - François Pienaar, South Africa
      - Martin Johnson, England
      - John Smit, South Africa
    - "Players who had left an indelible mark on [the] Rugby World Cup":
      - Brian Lima, Western Samoa
      - Jonah Lomu, New Zealand
      - Agustín Pichot, Argentina
      - Gareth Rees, Canada

== See also ==
- 2011 in sports
