= 1988 Australia rugby union tour of England, Scotland and Italy =

Summary
P	W	D	L
Total
15	12	0	3
Test match
3	2	0	1
Opponent
P	W	D	L
England
1	0	0	1
Scotland
1	1	0	0
Italy
1	1	0	0

The 1988 Australia rugby union tour of England, Scotland and Italy was a series of fifteen matches played by the Australia national rugby union team (the Wallabies) in England, Scotland and Italy (with one match in Wales) from October to December 1988. The Wallabies won eleven of their matches and lost the other four; they lost to England in their first international match but beat Scotland in the second and concluded the tour with a further international win over Italy.

== Matches ==
Scores and results list Australia's points tally first.

Opposing Team	Result	For	Against	Date	Venue
London	Lost	10	21	15 October	Twickenham, London
Northern Division	Lost	9	15	19 October	Cross Green, Otley
England B	Won	37	9	22 October	Heywood Road, Sale
South-West Division	Lost	10	26	26 October	Bristol
Midland Division	Won	25	18	29 October	Welford Road, Leicester
England Students	Won	36	13	1 November	Cambridge
ENGLAND	Lost	19	28	5 November	Twickenham, London
Edinburgh	Won	25	19	9 November	Myreside, Edinburgh
South of Scotland	Won	29	4	12 November	Mansfield Park, Hawick
North and Midlands of Scotland	Won	37	17	15 November	Dundee
SCOTLAND	Won	32	13	19 November	Murrayfield, Edinburgh
Combined Services	Won	48	7	22 November	Aldershot Military Stadium, Aldershot
Barbarians	Won	40	22	26 November	Cardiff Arms Park, Cardiff
Italy B	Won	26	18	30 November	Prato
ITALY	Won	55	6	3 December	Rome

== Touring party ==
- Coach : Bob Dwyer
- Assistant coach : Bob Templeton
- Tour Manager: A. J. Conway
- Captain: Nick Farr-Jones
