= Wally (Wallabies mascot) =

Australian rugby mascot

Wally is an anthropomorphic wallaby that serves as the official mascot of the Australia national rugby union team, the Wallabies.

In May 2007, a Welsh rugby fan was ejected from a stadium in Sydney during a match for attempting to dance with the life-size version of Wally. When Berrick Barnes was forced to protect Wally during the 2007 World Cup in France he had to stitch it up several times and perform a search of every member's hotel room to retrieve it, despite the help of Lote Tuqiri. During the 2008 tour it became a long-running joke among the players that the mascot could be used by 18-year-old James O'Connor to break the ice with young ladies.

== See also ==
- List of Australian sporting mascots
