= Vuvale Bowl =

- Sport: Rugby union
- Instituted: 2025; 1 year ago
- Number of teams: Australia; Fiji
- Holders: Australia (2025)
- Most titles: Australia (2 titles)

The Vuvale Bowl (English: Family Bowl) is a men's rugby union trophy contested between Australia and Fiji. Established in 2025, the trophy between the two teams was originally known as the Kava Bowl, and was first played for on Australia's 1984 tour of Fiji. Australia gifted the trophy to Fijian and Australian international player Ilivasi Tabua. Tabua later returned the trophy to the Fiji Rugby Union (FRU).

Australia won the inaugural trophy 21–18 in Newcastle, New South Wales, and were presented with the Vuvale Bowl by the Prime Minister of Australia Anthony Albanese and the Prime Minister of Fiji Sitiveni Rabuka.

== Statistics and results ==
As of 6 July 2025.

Host	Matches	Won by Australia	Won by Fiji	Draws	Australia points	Fiji points
Australia	1	1	0	0	21	18
Fiji	1	1	0	0	16	3
Overall	2	2	0	0	37	21

=== Results ===
Year	Date	Venue	Home	Score	Away	Attendance	Winner
1984	9 June	Buckhurst Park, Suva	Fiji	3–16	Australia	20,000	
2025	6 July	Newcastle International Sports Centre, Newcastle	Australia	21–18	Fiji	28,132	
