= Giteau's law =

Rugby Australia eligibility rule

Giteau's law, or the Giteau law, is the name given to a practice by Rugby Australia (RA), formerly known as the Australian Rugby Union (ARU), introduced in 2015 to allow overseas-based Australian rugby union players to be eligible to play for the Australia national rugby union team. The policy change was colloquially named after Matt Giteau, as the rule was seen primarily to bring him into the Australian side for the 2015 Rugby World Cup. The initial selection criteria was also dubbed the "60/7 Rule".

Year(s)	Criteria
Apr. 2015–Sep. 2020	Minimum 60 Test caps for Australia; and seven seasons at Super Rugby level.
Sep. 2020–Aug. 2021	Minimum 60 Test caps for Australia; and seven seasons at Super Rugby level.; Two extra overseas-based players (no criteria).
Aug. 2021–Feb. 2022	No criteria
Feb. 2022–present	Minimum 30 Test caps for Australia; and five seasons at Super Rugby level.; Only three overseas-based players can be selected per tournament/series.

== Background ==
Australia's record overseas-based selections (2021 Spring Tour) (Note: Caps and ages are as of 23 October 2021, Australia's first Test of the Spring Tour.)
Player	Position	Date of birth (age)	Caps	Club
Quade Cooper	Fly-half	5 April 1988 (aged 33)	74	Kintetsu Liners
Marika Koroibete	Wing	26 July 1992 (aged 29)	42	Saitama Wild Knights
Samu Kerevi	Centre	27 September 1993 (aged 28)	38	Tokyo Sungoliath
Sean McMahon	Back row	18 June 1994 (aged 27)	27	Tokyo Sungoliath
Rory Arnold	Lock	1 July 1990 (aged 31)	26	Toulouse
Tolu Latu	Hooker	23 February 1993 (aged 28)	19	Stade Français
Will Skelton	Lock	3 May 1992 (aged 29)	18	La Rochelle

Before the policy change, players could play for the Australian national rugby union team only if they played for an Australian team in the Super Rugby competition.

Then-head coach Michael Cheika devised Giteau's Law to enable key overseas-based players to be eligible for selection for the 2015 Rugby World Cup. In April 2015, the Australian Rugby Union (ARU) announced this new arrangement. The rule also allowed players to return to Test duty immediately if they have signed with a Super Rugby club for the following two years.

=== Amendments ===
In 2020, Rugby Australia approved an amendment to Giteau's Law that allowed up to two overseas-based players to be selected, regardless of the total overseas-based players in the squad, that did not meet the original criteria to be selected.

Due to the COVID-19 pandemic, RA relaxed selection eligibility in August 2021 ahead of the 2021 Rugby Championship and Spring Tour, with plans to review the policy following their final fixture. No quota was given as to how many players could be selected. The overseas-based selections reach a record high since the introduction of Giteau's law during the 2021 Spring Tour. Seven overseas-based players were called-up to the Wallabies squad ahead of their tour of Japan and Great Britain, with the 2020 amendments having continued through the following year despite originally being for 2020 only. Four players were based in Japan (Quade Cooper, Marika Koroibete, Samu Kerevi, Sean McMahon), with the remaining three playing in France (Rory Arnold, Tolu Latu, Will Skelton).

In February 2022 a final policy was made to the Giteau Law. The new amendment would lower the original rule (sixty Test caps for Australia and a minimum of seven seasons at Super rugby level) to thirty Test caps and five years at Super Rugby level, respectively. However, the new amendment only allowed for three overseas-based players to be selected per tournament or series. Despite efforts to relax the law later in the year by coach Dave Rennie, Rugby Australia did not change the selection policy.

=== 2025–2026 ===
In August 2025, Rugby Australia Director of High Performance Peter Horne stated that the "Giteau law" criteria for national selection was redundant and that the coach, Joe Schmidt, was free to select all eligible Australian players, domestic- or overseas-based. However, the following year Horne reiterated that the 2022 policy changes were still in place. "The current policy is basically exactly the same as it's been since [2022], so nothing's changed," Horne said in an interview with The Age, adding: "If there was an absolute need to put a player [in], the case would have to go to the board, and it's not as likely as someone that's already got a Test decorated career like Will [Skelton] or Hoops [Tom Hooper], or if James O'Connor came up again. All those players overseas who have got a long-standing position with Australia [rugby] and are available for selection."

== Effect ==
Assistant national coach Stephen Larkham said the rule enabled the Australian world cup squad to benefit from more experienced players. He said "It's not just a team that's a little bit older and therefore more experienced (but) we've got the right number of experienced guys, the right number of older guys and the right number of younger enthusiastic guys."

The New Zealand Rugby Union (NZRU) Chief Executive Steve Tew said he would not implement such a rule for the New Zealand national team, stating: "[New Zealand] didn't often follow Australia".

Following the 2015 Rugby World Cup, head coach Michael Cheika hoped as much as 85% of the squad would be available for the 2019 Rugby World Cup, including players available under Giteau's Law.

== Reception ==
Just over 12 months out from the 2015 Rugby World Cup, Australian forward Kane Douglas, who was playing for Irish club Leinster, praised the restrictive selection policy for the national team in place at the time, despite the potential of missing selection. In an interview with the Australian Broadcasting Corporation (ABC), Douglas stated, "they've [ARU] got to be strong on their stance and encourage boys to stay and play in Australia and for Australia." In 2015, Douglas was released from his contract with Leinster, signed a three-year contract with the Queensland Reds, and was selected in the Australia squad for the 2015 Rugby World Cup.

Upon the announcement of Giteau's law, Australian Rugby Union chief executive Bill Pulver stated: "This is a pivotal moment for Rugby in Australia, where for the first time in its professional history, the ARU will allow overseas-based players who have made a significant contribution to Australian Rugby to become eligible for the Wallabies."

Since its introduction in 2015, the policy has attracted both support and opposition from former Australian Test players. Matt To'omua, Will Genia, David Campese, James Horwill, Quade Cooper, and Matt Giteau, the policy's namesake, have all called for its abolition. Conversely, Ben Darwin and Stirling Mortlock have publicly supported its retention.

== See also ==
- International rugby union eligibility rules
