= 2000 Argentina rugby union tour of Australia and England =

Summary
P	W	D	L
Total
4	2	0	2
Test match
2	0	0	2
Opponent
P	W	D	L
Australia
2	0	0	2

2000 Argentina rugby union tour of Australia and England
Summary
P	W	D	L
Total
2	1	0	1
Test match
1	0	0	1
Opponent
P	W	D	L
England
1	0	0	1

The 2000 Argentina rugby union tour of Australia and England were two series of matches played by the Argentina national rugby union team. The first tour (four matches) was held in June, and the second (two matches) in November.

== Matches ==
=== in Australia ===
Scores and results list Argentina's points tally first.

Opposing team	For	Against	Date	Venue	Status
Queensland	35	29	13 June 2000	Ballymore, Brisbane	Tour match
Australia	6	53	17 June 2000	Ballymore, Brisbane	Test match
New South Wales	27	26	20 June 2000	Sydney	Tour match
Australia	25	32	24 June 2000	Bruce Stadium, Canberra	Test match

=== In England ===
Scores and results list Argentina's points tally first.

Opposing team	For	Against	Date	Venue	Status
Combined Services	44	7	21 November 2000	Portsmouth	Tour match
England	0	19	25 November 2000	Twickenham, London	Test match

== Sources ==
- Union Argentina de Rugby (January 2002). "MEMORIA Temporada año 2000" (.doc) (in Spanish).
