= 1986 Italy rugby union tour of Australia =

Summary
P	W	D	L
Total
5	2	0	3
Test match
1	1	0	0
Opponent
P	W	D	L
Australia
1	0	0	1

The 1986 Italy rugby union tour of Australia was a series of matches played between May and June 1986 in Australia by Italy national rugby union team. The final match of the tour was the first full international test between Italy and Australia.

== Results ==
Scores and results list Italy's points tally first.

Opposing Team	For	Against	Date	Venue	Status
New South Wales Country	9	22	18 May 1986	Newcastle	Tour match
Brisbane	19	37	21 May 1986	Brisbane	Tour match
North Queensland	28	15	25 May 1986	Townsville	Tour match
Queensland Country	25	23	28 May 1986	Stanthorpe	Tour match
Australia	18	39	1 June 1986	Ballymore, Brisbane	Test match
