= Tolu Latu =

Australia international rugby union player

- Full name: Silalotu Latu
- Born: 23 February 1993 (age 33) Nukuʻalofa, Tonga
- Height: 1.77 m (5 ft 10 in)
- Weight: 113 kg (249 lb)
- Notable relative: Lotu Taukeiaho (cousin)

Rugby union career
- Position: Hooker
- Current team: Stade Français
Amateur team(s)
Years	Team	Apps	(Points)
2013–2018	Sydney University	15	(20)
Senior career
Years	Team	Apps	(Points)
2014–2019	Waratahs	31	(5)
2014−2016	Sydney Stars	6	(0)
2016–2019	NSW Country Eagles	9	(10)
2019–2022	Stade Français Paris	54	(30)
2023	Waratahs	7	(0)
2023–	Montpellier	2	(0)
- Correct as of 10 July 2023
International career
Years	Team	Apps	(Points)
2012–2013	Australia U20	9	(10)
2016–2021	Australia	21	(10)
- Correct as of 2 July 2022

Silalotu Latu (born 23 February 1993) is a Tongan-born Australian Rugby Union player who currently is a hooker for the New South Wales Waratahs in Super Rugby.

== Career ==
Latu plays Shute Shield rugby for Sydney University and was a member of the premiership-winning side in 2013. His performances there caught the eye of the New South Wales Waratahs who signed him up ahead of the 2014 Super Rugby season. Tolu Latu represented the Sydney East Primary Schools Sports Association at the State Championships in 2005.

== International career ==
Latu was a member of the Australia Under 20 side that competed in the 2012 and 2013 IRB Junior World Championships.

Latu made his debut for Australia against Wales in 2016. and played at the 2019 Rugby World Cup, but the Wallabies lost to England in the quarter finals, thus knocking them out.

In 2021, Latu was called up to play in the 2021 end-of-year rugby tests, under a new Giteau's law tweak that allowed up to three players from overseas to appear. He was called up alongside former players Will Skelton, Kurtley Beale and Rory Arnold.
