= Australia national rugby union team =

Australia
- Nickname: Wallabies
- Emblem: Wallaby
- Union: Rugby Australia
- Head coach: Les Kiss
- Captain: Harry Wilson
- Most caps: James Slipper (154)
- Top scorer: Michael Lynagh (911)
- Top try scorer: David Campese (64)
First colours	Second colours

World Rugby ranking
- Current: 6 (as of 28 September 2026)
- Highest: 2 (2004 (Note: 2004–2005, 2007, 2010–2012, 2015–2016))
- Lowest: 10 (2023, 2024)

First international
- Australia 13–3 British Isles (Sydney, New South Wales; 24 June 1899)

Biggest win
- Australia 142–0 Namibia (Adelaide, Australia; 25 October 2003)

Biggest defeat
- South Africa 53–8 Australia (Johannesburg, South Africa; 30 August 2008)

World Cup
- Appearances: 10 (first in 1987)
- Best result: Champions (1991, 1999)

Tri Nations/Rugby Championship
- Appearances: 28
- Best result: Champions (2000, 2001, 2011, 2015)
Medal record
Men's rugby
Gold medal – first place	1908 London	Team
- Website: rugby.com.au

The Australia national rugby union team, nicknamed the Wallabies, represents Australia in men's international rugby union. The Wallabies' first test match was played in Sydney in 1899, against the touring British Isles team.

At first "Wallabies" only pertained to the 1908/09 tour party, then in the 1930s to all Australian national squads making overseas visits. From 1985 onwards "Wallabies" was applicable to all current and past Australian teams whether at home or away. The first Australian sides of the early 1900s that toured overseas performed a war cry that was claimed at the time to have Aboriginal Australian origins.

Australia has competed in all ten men's Rugby World Cups, winning the competition twice and finishing as runner-up twice.

The Wallabies also compete in The Rugby Championship (formerly the Tri-Nations), along with Argentina, New Zealand and South Africa, winning the championship four times.

More than a dozen former Wallabies players have been inducted into the World Rugby Hall of Fame.

== History ==
=== Early years ===
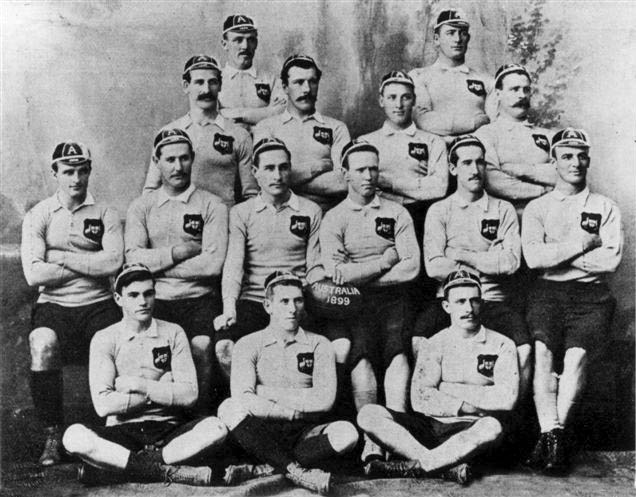
The 1899 Australia team

Australia's first international match was played against the touring British Isles team in 1899. The first test was played at the Sydney Cricket Ground and won 13–3 by Australia, but the tourists would win the remaining three tests. The Australian team for the first match consisted of six players from Queensland and nine from New South Wales, and the first Australian captain was Frank Row of Sydney's Wallaroo FC.. The team wore the blue of New South Wales when playing in Sydney and the maroon of Queensland when playing in Brisbane, but with an Australian Coat of Arms in place of the usual emblems of each colony.

The first Test between Australia and New Zealand was played at the Sydney Cricket Ground in 1903, with New Zealand winning 22–3. This tour improved rugby's popularity in Sydney and Brisbane and helped to boost club match attendances.

In 1907 the New South Wales Rugby League was formed and star player Dally Messenger left Rugby Union for Rugby League.

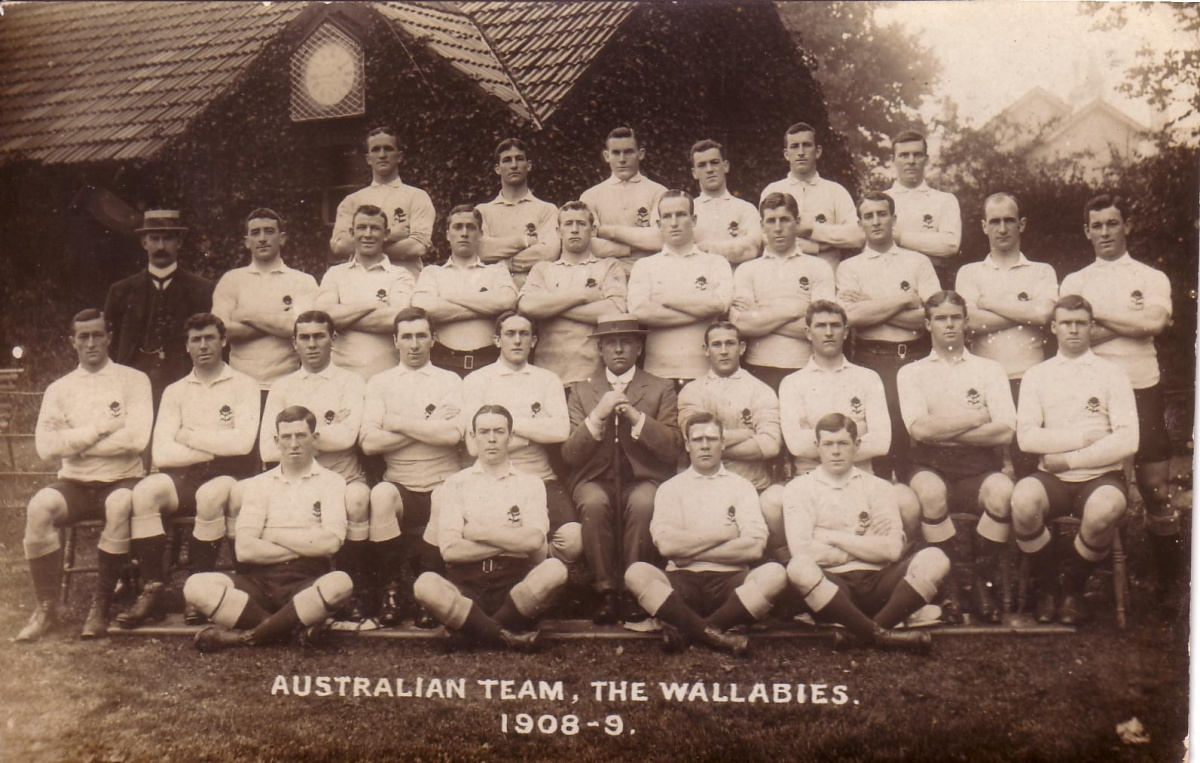
The squad that went on tour in 1908–09

The next year the first Australian rugby union team to tour the British Isles left Sydney. At a pre-tour function it was announced the team would be called "the Rabbits", which British newspapers soon picked up on. The Australian players thought this nickname derogatory and after arriving in England replaced it with "the Wallabies".

The First World War had a terrible impact on rugby union in Australia. All rugby union competitions in New South Wales and Queensland ceased after the state bodies decided it was inappropriate to play the sport when so many young men were fighting overseas. The sport of rugby union was almost entirely shut down, causing many players to switch to rugby league – which did not cease playing during the war.

In Queensland regular competitions did not commence again until 1929, and there was no official Australian team selected through most of the 1920s before the 1929 All Blacks tour. The New South Wales Waratahs were re-formed in 1920, however, and played regularly throughout the decade including a series of matches against New Zealand and South Africa before their 1927–28 tour of the British Isles, France and Canada. Because these Waratahs teams were Australia's only representatives at the time, all international matches they played during this period were accorded retrospective Wallaby status.

War hero Sir Edward "Weary" Dunlop also played for Australia before World War II. He played on the side that was the first to win the Bledisloe Cup.

=== Post-war: 1946–1959 ===
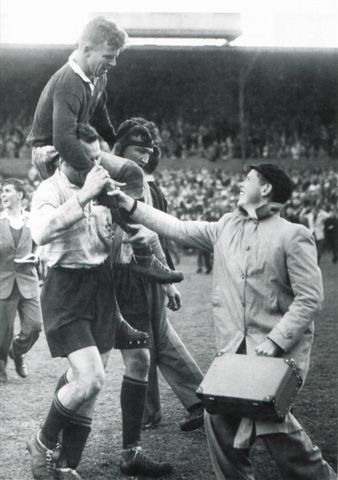
Wallaby captain Solomon chaired by the Springboks 1953

World War Two halted all international rugby. The first test following the war for Australia was played at Carisbrook, Dunedin against New Zealand in 1946, which New Zealand won 31–8. Australia did not win on the three match tour; beaten 20–0 by New Zealand Maori, and then losing 14–10 to the All Blacks the following week.

Australia embarked on a tour of the home nations in 1947–48. The successful tour fell one game short of an undefeated run when the Australians lost to France in the final match, in Paris. Players on the rise included Trevor Allan, Cyril Burke and Nicholas Shehadie.

After returning from the successful European tour, Australia hosted the New Zealand Maori in a three match series in 1949; both sides winning once, with one draw. In September of that year, Australia played the All Blacks twice in New Zealand, winning both games and taking back the Bledisloe Cup for the first time on New Zealand soil. The 'Number 1' All Black side was touring South Africa at the time and the wins by Australia against the B-team have sometimes been downgraded. However, in deference to the apartheid system then in operation in South Africa, the NZRU did not select any Maori players for the tour. Many of those regular All Black Maori played against Australia instead and it could be said that the New Zealand team that played Australia was at least as good as the one on tour in South Africa.

The British Lions toured Australia in 1950, and played two tests against Australia, winning both with scores of 19–6 in Brisbane and 24–3 in Sydney.

The following year Australia fell to a three Test whitewash to the All Blacks. Australia won in July 1952, defeating Fiji at the Sydney Cricket Ground – then lost the second Test to Fiji by two points. Australia managed to beat the All Blacks at Lancaster Park after the Fijian series; however they lost the second Test.

On this tour they also drew against Rhodesia in Kitwe 8–8.

=== 1960s ===
The first match of the new decade was the win over Fiji at the SCG in the first match of a three Test series during 1961. This was followed by a second win, but Fiji grabbed a draw in the third Test. Australia then headed to South Africa, where they lost to the Springboks in Port Elizabeth and Johannesburg. After returning home, they faced France at the SCG, who beat them 15–8.

In 1962, Australia played the All Blacks five times, losing four and drawing one, 9–9 at Athletic Park. After defeating England 18–9 in 1963 in Sydney, Australia beat the Springboks in consecutive Tests in South Africa; the first team to do so since the 1896 British team.

Fewer tests were played throughout the mid-1960s, with Australia only playing a three Test series against All Blacks in 1964. They won the third Test after losing the first two. The following year Australia hosted the Springboks for two Tests, winning 18–11 and 12–8. This was their first ever series win over South Africa and first over a major nation since 1934.

The British Lions toured in 1966, beating Australia 11–8 at the SCG, before hammering them 31–0 in Brisbane. Australia left for Europe in that December where a 14–11 victory over Wales was followed by a slim 11–5 defeat of Scotland. The tour continued into the following year where Australia beat England 23–11 before losing to Ireland 15–8 and France 20–14. Australia then hosted Ireland, who beat them in Sydney, followed by a 20-point loss to the All Blacks. The following year, Australia lost to the All Blacks by just one point. Later that year they defeated France for the first time by the same margin from a long drop goal by John Ballesty for their last win of the decade. After losing to Ireland and Scotland on tour, Australia hosted Wales who also beat them.

=== 1970s ===
Australia's only test in 1970 was a win against Scotland. The next year, the controversial 1971 South African tour of Australia took place. Australia lost all three tests against South Africa, however the tour is remembered for the nationwide protests against the Apartheid system and the month long state of emergency in Queensland that was declared by the state's premier, Joh Bjeke Petersen, to break up protestors. Australia toured France in November, winning the first test in Toulouse, but losing the second in Paris.

France then visited Australia in 1972 and played a two test series where France won the first test and the second, a draw. Australia then traveled to New Zealand to play a three test series against the All Blacks where the Wallabies lost all three. A final test in Suva to play Fiji would be their only victory of the year.

In 1973, Australia hosted Tonga, winning the first test, but losing 11–16 at Ballymore in their second. Australia then had a short tour of the United Kingdom in November losing 24–0 to Wales, and 20–3 to England.

In 1974, former Wallaby Dick Marks was appointed as the inaugural National Director of Coaching, beginning a period of systematic improvement of Australian rugby under the National Coaching Scheme. The foundations built here would lead to outstanding international successes through the 1980s and 1990s. The tests played in 1974 saw Australia hosting the All Blacks for a three test series—losing two, but drawing in Brisbane.

In 1975 Australia defeated England in a two test series at home. This was followed by playing Japan for the first time where, in a two match series, the Wallabies won both tests. Australia then embarked on a tour of Britain and Ireland at the end of 1975 with losses against Scotland, Wales, and England but defeated Ireland at Lansdowne Road.

On their way home, and now in 1976, Australia played one match in Los Angeles against the United States. Australia winning 24–12. In June, Australia hosted Fiji for a three Test series and won three. The Wallabies finished the year with a tour of Europe where the team lost two tests against France, then narrowly beat Italy 16–15.

Australia would play no tests in 1977.

Wales toured Australia in 1978, which saw the Wallabies winners by 18–8 at Ballymore, and then again by two points at the SCG. This was followed by a three match series against the All Blacks in New Zealand. New Zealand won the first two tests but Australia won the last test at Eden Park with Greg Cornelsen scoring four tries. in 1979 Ireland visited Australia for a two match series with Ireland winning both tests. After this defeat Australia hosted the All Blacks for a single Test at the SCG which Australia won 12–6. Australia then traveled to Argentina for a two test series, with both teams winning one test each.

=== 1980s ===
In 1980 Australia won the Bledisloe Cup for only the fourth time—defeating New Zealand 2–1 in a three match series in Australia. This was the start of a successful era for Australia. In 1984 Australia toured the Home nations with a young side and new coach Alan Jones. The 1984 Wallabies became the first team from Australia to achieve a Grand Slam by defeating all four Home Nations: England, Ireland, Wales and Scotland, and a strong Barbarians side. The tour signalled the emergence of Australia as a serious force on the world stage. Many records were established on the tour including; 100 points being scored in the four Tests—the most scored by a touring team to the United Kingdom and Ireland, the first ever push-over try conceded by Wales in Cardiff, Mark Ella scoring a try in each match – a feat never before achieved.

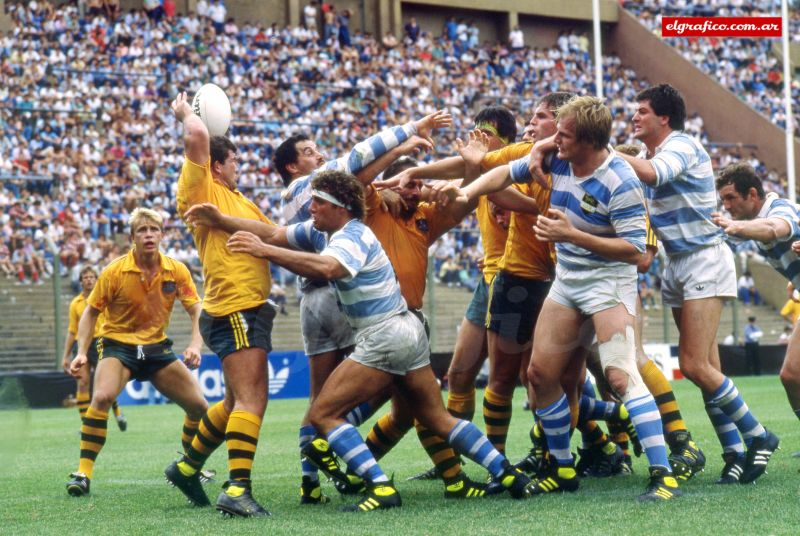
Australia playing Argentina at Vélez Sarsfield stadium, 7 November 1987

In 1986 Australia toured New Zealand in a three match series for the Bledisloe Cup. New Zealand rugby was in turmoil as an unofficial team named The Cavaliers that contained the bulk of the All Blacks players toured South Africa. On return those All Blacks who had toured with The Cavaliers were banned from selection for the first Bledisloe Test. Australia went on to win the first match by 13–12. The ban on players was lifted for the second Test which was played on 23 August 1986 at Carisbrook. New Zealand squared the series 1–1 by winning the match 13–12. The final Test was played on 6 September 1986 at Eden Park where Australia beat a full strength New Zealand team 22–9 to secure their first series win on New Zealand soil.

Australia went into the inaugural Rugby World Cup in 1987 confident. However, the semi-final against France at Sydney's Concord Oval, was lost 30–26. Australia then lost the 3rd place play-off match against Wales. While Australia's performances over the three years under coach Alan Jones were of a high standard, Jones had a polarising effect on the team with many players unhappy with his management style. Mark Ella, who retired after the 1984 season, stated that he might not have retired if someone else had been the coach. Notably, there were deep ructions between coach Alan Jones and influential half-back Nick Farr-Jones. Before and during the 1987 World Cup Alan Jones increased his activities outside coaching Australia, including radio broadcasting. Following the World Cup Jones was removed as coach and Bob Dwyer—who had coached Australia in 1982 and 1983—returned to coach in 1988.

In 1989 the British Lions toured Australia for the first time since 1966. After winning the first Test, Australia lost the second and third matches to lose the series 2–1. Bob Dwyer identified a lack of forward dominance as a major factor contributing to the loss and entered the 1990s with an aim to improve this facet of the Wallaby game.

John Moulton was the Wallabies team doctor during the 1986 Bledisloe Cup win in New Zealand and the Rugby World Cup in 1987 and the Rugby World Cup victory in 1991.

=== 1990s ===
The team regrouped and then went into the 1991 World Cup with a renewed attitude. In the pool games they beat Argentina, cruised to a 38–3 win over Wales, and beat Samoa 9–3 in a rain soaked game. During the quarter-final match against Ireland, Australia were never able to pull away from them and with literally only seconds remaining on the clock, Ireland were up 18–15 before Michael Lynagh scored in the corner to break the hearts of the Irish and qualify for the semi-final against New Zealand. In the first half Australia raced to a 13–3 lead and then showed they could defend as the All Blacks unsuccessfully tried to find a way through their line. Winning the semi-final, Australia would face England in the final at the home of English Rugby at Twickenham. England changed their usually forward-dominated game plan and attempted to play more of a running game. It was unsuccessful and Australia battled out a 12–6 win. David Campese was named player of the tournament having scored six tries. Victory parades were held back in Australia for their national team.

Australia's defence of the World Cup in South Africa in 1995 opened with defeat by the home side. Pool play was followed by an exit in the quarter-final against England courtesy of a long-range drop-goal from the boot of Rob Andrew. This was Australia's second worst World Cup result, on a par with Australia's unexpected exit from the 2007 campaign at the quarter-final stage, also against England. The Tri-Nations and Super 12 tournaments were established that year, and started in 1996. This pushed the game into professionalism. In response to rugby's move to professionalism, the Rugby Union Players Association (RUPA) was established in October 1995 to safeguard the interests of Australia's professional rugby players.

Greg Smith was national coach in 1996 and 1997 when Australia only won two of their eight Tri-Nations Tests, both over South Africa in Australia, and suffered record-margin Test defeats by the All Blacks and Springboks. Rod Macqueen was appointed as Smith's successor and in 1998 Australia won both their Tests over the All Blacks to regain the Bledisloe Cup. They retained the Bledisloe in 1999 when they defeated New Zealand in a, then record defeat for the All Blacks, 28–7 in Sydney.

In the 1999 World Cup Australia won their pool and conceded only 31 points before facing Wales in the quarter-final. They won 24–9 before winning the semi-final 27–21 against defending champions South Africa. The semi-final was won after a memorable drop goal in extra time by fly-half Stephen Larkham (his first drop goal scored in a Test match). The final against France at Millennium Stadium was easily won by 35–12; with the majority of points courtesy of fullback and goal-kicker Matt Burke.

In 1999, five Australian players won their second Rugby World Cup: Phil Kearns, John Eales, Tim Horan, Jason Little and Dan Crowley. Australia also became the first nation to win two Rugby World Cups.

=== 2000s ===
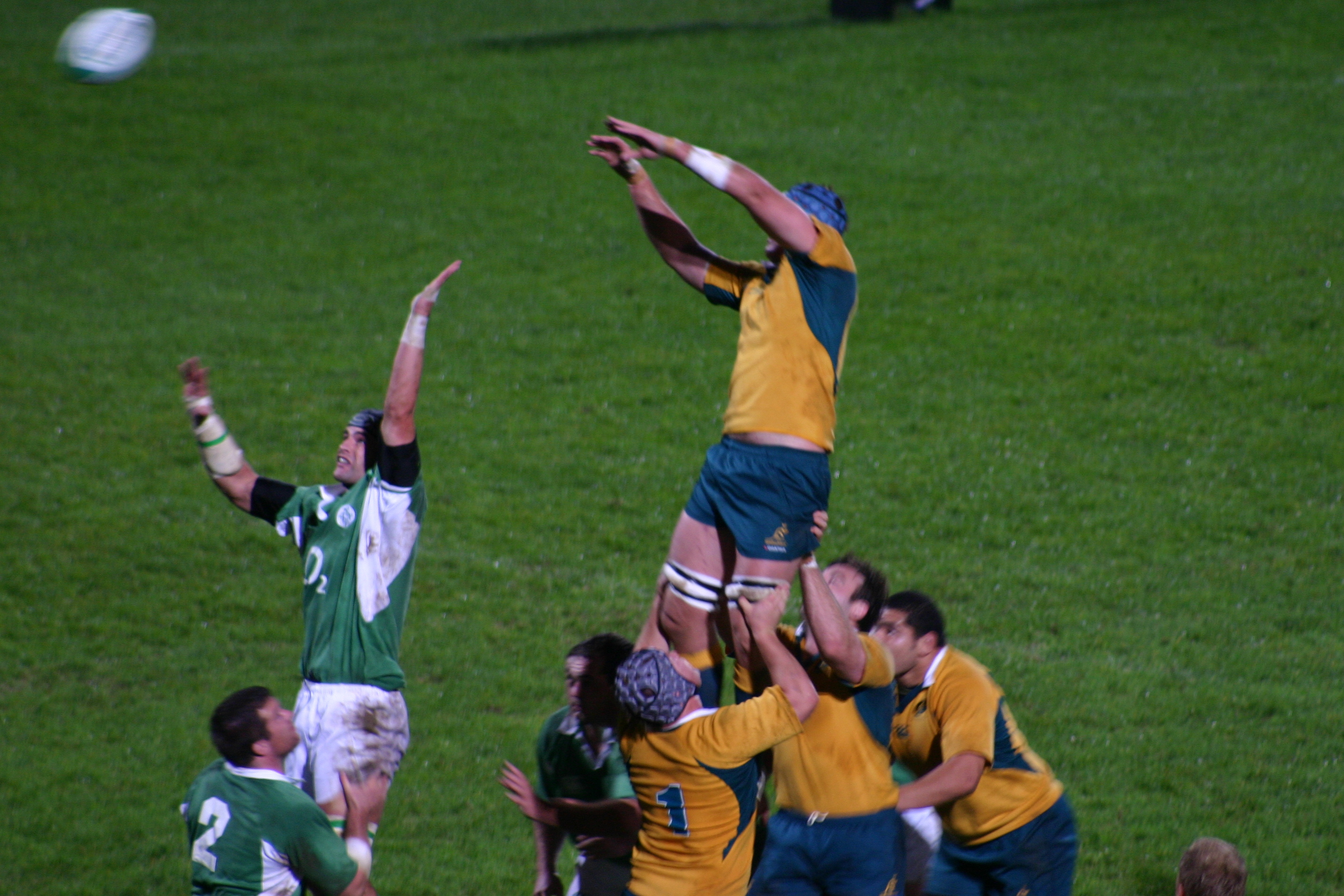
A lineout between Ireland and Australia in 2006

In the early 2000s, Australia continued their dominant international success under coach Rod Macqueen. In 2000 they retained the Bledisloe Cup and won the Tri Nations Series for the very first time after clinching a one-point victory over South Africa in the final match of the 2000 Tri Nations Series in Durban due to a Stirling Mortlock penalty goal in the last minute of the game. The triumph was also noted for being the first time since 1992 that Australia had beaten the Springboks in South Africa (or 7 years, 363 days); and being the first SANZAR team to claim the Rugby World Cup title and the Tri Nations title back-to-back.

In 2001 the Wallabies achieved their first series win over the British & Irish Lions since 1930. By mid-July 2001, coach Rod Macqueen and captain John Eales both retired. At the time of his retirement, Macqueen had been Australia's most successful coach. BBC Sport reported that: "Australia's 2–1 series win over the Lions left the Wallabies' coach with nothing left to win. A series win over the Lions eluded Australia for 102 years, but the celebrations in Stadium Australia which followed the 29–23 win on Saturday was the completion of the most impressive CV in Australian rugby. The 1999 World Cup, the 2000 Tri-Nations title and three successive Bledisloe Cup wins over deadly All Black rivals from across the Tasman Sea, bulge in the Wallabies' trophy cabinet. They mark Macqueen out as the most successful coach in Australian rugby union history." The report added that "during Macqueen's four-year tenure the Wallabies posted an unrivalled record of 34 wins, one draw and eight defeats for a success ratio of close to 80%." Macqueen and Eales were replaced by then-ACT Brumbies coach Eddie Jones and team captain George Gregan. This period also saw big-money signings of top-level rugby league footballers, such as Mat Rogers, Wendell Sailor, and Lote Tuqiri, all of whom went on to represent the Wallabies. This was in contrast to much of the previous century where many rugby union players were lured to rugby league with large salaries.

Jones had been appointed Wallabies' head coach on the back of winning the Super 12 with the Brumbies, the first team from outside New Zealand to do so. Jones' Wallabies dropped the Tri Nations Series title in 2002, and again in 2003, finishing in second place both times, which included a 21–50 defeat to New Zealand at Stadium Australia in Sydney: the most points Australia had ever conceded at home, and a New Zealand record score put against Australia. Australia's form recovered at the 2003 Rugby World Cup hosted on home soil as they headed into the tournament with three wins and four losses. The Wallabies, placed in Pool A, won every pool match and set a national record and two Rugby World Cup records with the biggest margin of victory, and the most tries in a single match (22), both against Namibia in their 142–0 win. The Wallabies won their pool and comfortably beat Scotland 33–16 in a "scrappy" Quarter-finals. Australia then faced New Zealand in the Semi-finals. Despite yielding just a single try, courtesy of an intercept, the match stands as one of the most complete and exhilarating performances in Wallabies history. Under Eddie Jones' ball-in-hand gameplan, and dominating the early exchanges, New Zealand scarcely touched the ball in the opening minutes. By half-time, Australia had 66% possession. Ultimately Australia won 22–10, and prompted captain George Gregan to taunt the New Zealanders with the words "four more years boys, four more years". The match is widely regarded as a historic Australian rugby match with a BBC Sport sub-header reading at the time: "Reigning champions Australia marched into the Rugby World Cup final with a clinical demolition of tournament favourites New Zealand." Australia advanced to the 2003 Rugby World Cup final ahead of the second Semi-finals match between France and England; both teams Australia had played in a final before (England in 1991; France in 1999). England defeated France 7–24, with every point coming through fly-half Jonny Wilkinson. On a damp Sydney evening before a World Cup record crowd of 82,957, England and Australia played a tense, rain-affected match that saw multiple lead changes, penalties, and tries. Australia opened the scoring with Tuqiri's try, but England responded with Wilkinson's penalties and a Robinson try, taking a 14–5 lead into halftime. The second half featured errors from both sides, strategic substitutions, and a series of penalties and near-tries, with Flatley and Wilkinson exchanging crucial kicks to keep the game close. With the score tied 14–14 at full time, the match went into extra time, where both teams continued to capitalise on penalties and drop goal attempts. Ultimately, Wilkinson secured victory for England with a decisive right-foot drop goal in the final 30 seconds, clinching their first Rugby World Cup with a 20–17 win over Australia. The final broke Australian television records. It reached a peak of 4.34 million viewers and had was the most-watched television program in Australia since the 2000 Summer Olympics hosted in Sydney. In England, the final had a peak of 14.5 million viewers, and was the second highest-ever audience recorded for an international rugby match in the United Kingdom, behind the 1991 Rugby World Cup final.

In 2005 to celebrate the ten-year anniversary of the professionalism of rugby union the Wallaby Team of the Decade was announced. John Eales being named captain by a selection panel of 30. Following the 2005 European tour, media outlets such as the Daily Telegraph called for the sacking of both Eddie Jones and George Gregan. Former coach Alan Jones also called for their sacking. The record of eight losses from their last nine Tests resulted in Jones being fired by the Australian Rugby Union.

John Connolly was named as the head coach of Australia in early 2006. Australia won both of two Tests against England in 2006, as well as a subsequent win over Ireland. Australia lost by 20 points in their opening Tri-Nations fixture against the All Blacks. They then beat South Africa in Brisbane by 49–0. They won one of their remaining four matches of the tournament. Following defeat by England in the quarter-finals of the 2007 Rugby World Cup, Connolly announced he was resigning as head coach.

Robbie Deans was appointed head coach in early 2008 as the Wallabies began their preparations for the 2008 Tri-Nations series. After the retirement of George Gregan and Stephen Larkham after the 2007 Rugby World Cup, Deans had the task of choosing a squad minus some of its most experienced players. The Wallabies had mixed results in the 2008 Tri Nations Series, defeating New Zealand in Sydney and beating South Africa twice, in both Perth and Durban. However, the Wallabies suffered the worst defeat in their history, going down 53–8 to South Africa in Johannesburg.

2009 was not a good year for the Wallabies. It was a good start for them as they defeated the Barbarians 55–7 and then beat Italy in both tests and finishing off the Mid year test series with a 22–6 win over France. It went downhill from there as they finished 3rd in the Tri Nations with three losses to the All Blacks (22–16, 19–18 and 33–6) and two losses to the World Champion Springboks (29–17 and 32–25). Their only win in the Tri Nations was a 21–6 win over South Africa. In the Autumn Internationals of 2009, they lost to New Zealand 32–19, they beat England 18–9 on Jonny Wilkinson's return in the English jersey. The Wallabies then drew with Ireland 20–20 after Brian O'Driscoll's last minute try to give Ronan O'Gara a relatively easy conversion to draw level. They then lost to Scotland for the first time in 27 years. The final score was 9–8 despite the 3–3 score at half time. The Wallabies only won 7 out of their 14 games in 2009 but were still ranked 3rd in the world.

=== 2010s ===
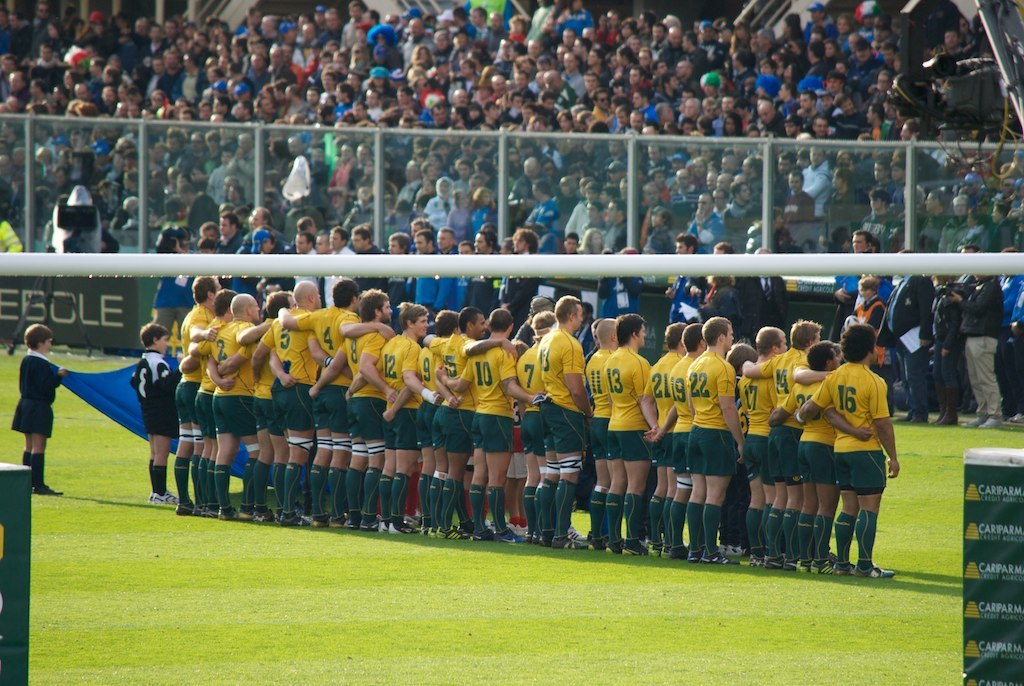
Australia lineup against Italy during their 2010 Spring Tour.

2010 saw improved results in the Tri Nations series, with a rare away win against South Africa awarding Australia the Mandela Plate and ensuring they retained second place in the 2010 Tri Nations competition as well as the Rugby World Rankings. However, they suffered their tenth consecutive defeat at the hands of New Zealand, an all-time record. Later that year, Australia finally beat the All Blacks 26-24 in a thrilling game played in Hong Kong, their first win against New Zealand in nearly three years. On the end of year tour they defeated Wales, France and Italy but lost to England and a suffered a shock defeat to Munster.

The Wallabies 2011 season began with a surprise loss to Samoa in Sydney 23–32. The Wallabies however would go on to win the shortened 2011 Tri-Nations series, beating South Africa twice and winning one match and losing one against New Zealand. This was the first Tri-Nations Australia had won since 2001.

Australia's 2011 Rugby World Cup campaign began with a 32-6 win against Italy, followed by a 6-15 defeat against Ireland, a 67-5 win over the United States and, finally for the pool stage, a 68-22 win over Russia. Finishing 2nd in their pool, the Wallabies faced South Africa in the quarter finals defeating them 11-9. A week later the Wallabies were knocked out of the World Cup after being defeated 6-20 by New Zealand in the semi-finals. Australia's final match was against Wales in the bronze medal match, with Australia narrowly winning 21-18.

2012 started with a loss against Scotland before Wales arrived for a three test tour of Australia. The Wallabies narrowly won all 3 tests. Next was the inaugural Rugby Championship tournament, which replaced the Tri-Nations series following the addition of Argentina. The tournament saw the Wallabies finish second after beating Argentina twice and South Africa once, while losing twice to New Zealand and once against South Africa. An 18-18 draw against New Zealand led into the end of year tour where the Wallabies defeated England, Italy and Wales but lost to France.

2013 began with Australia hosting a British & Irish Lions tour. The Wallabies won 1 test and lost 2, marking the first time the British and Irish Lions had won a tour since their 1997 tour of South Africa. With a winning rate of 58.1%, and a poor 3–15 record against the All Blacks, Robbie Deans came under increasing pressure to keep his coaching position. Deans resigned in July 2013, ending his six-year tenure as head coach of the Wallabies. During his tenure, Deans coached the Wallabies on 74 occasions winning 43 times, losing 29 and drawing 2. He had won just 3 times against their main rivals, the All Blacks, with 1 draw in 2012. However, he left with a good record against the Springboks, with 9 wins from 14. Highlights during his tenure as coach included leading the Wallabies to a Tri-Nations championship in 2011 and to a 3rd-place finish in the 2011 Rugby World Cup.

On 9 July 2013, Queensland Reds coach Ewen McKenzie was officially named Wallabies coach to replace Robbie Deans. McKenzie's first match in charge was a 47–29 loss to New Zealand in the opening fixture of the 2013 Rugby Championship. In this match he gave five debutants their first cap. The 27–16 loss a week later, meant the Bledisloe Cup would stay with New Zealand for the 11th year in a row. The next test saw McKenzie led the team to a 38–12 loss to South Africa, the biggest ever winning margin by South Africa over Australia in Australia. The 14–13 win over Argentina was McKenzie's first victory as an international coach, but the scoreless second half was the first time Australia had failed to score points in the second half at home since 2005. The Wallabies lost again 28–8 against South Africa in Cape Town. Australia's final fixture of the competition saw a bonus point win away in Argentina of 54-17. During the Championship, McKenzie made several bold moves as a coach. He dropped star player Will Genia for Nic White, who at the time had only three caps, and named Ben Mowen as captain in his first year as a test player.

In the 2013 end-of-year tour, Australia lost the first test 20–13 to England, however McKenzie then led the team to four consecutive wins (50–20 win over Italy, 32–15 win over Ireland, 21–15 win over Scotland and a 30–26 win over Wales) which was the first time Australia had done this since 2008. The tour saw Australia retaining the Lansdowne Cup, claimed the Hopetoun Cup and retained the James Bevan Trophy for the sixth time in a row.

In 2014, their four consecutive wins were increased to seven for the first time since 2000. They earned a 3–0 test series win over France during the June International Window, which included a 50–23 win in Brisbane, a 6–0 win in Melbourne and a 39–13 win in Sydney. The series win meant Australia reclaimed the Trophée des Bicentenaires for the first time since 2010, after losing it in 2012. The Wallabies' unbeaten run stretched to eight matches with a 12–12 draw with New Zealand, prompting optimism that Australia could finally reclaim the Bledisloe Cup for the first time since 2002, in addition to ending their 28-year winless run at Eden Park. However, Australia came crashing back to earth, suffering a 51–20 defeat during the second Bledisloe test, staged at the venue, stretching Australia's Bledisloe Cup drought to a 12th year. Australia managed to bounce back from that defeat, with hard fought 24–23 and 32–25 wins over South Africa and Argentina, with the latter win ensuring that Australia retained the Puma Trophy. However, Australia was unable to reclaim the Mandela Challenge Plate, suffering a 28–11 loss to South Africa, after conceding three tries and a drop goal in the final 11 minutes of the match. A week later, Australia suffered a 21–17 loss to Argentina, their first loss to Argentina in 17 years. This loss meant that Australia became the first country to lose to Argentina in the Rugby Championship since Argentina's admittance in 2012. For the second consecutive year, Australia finished in third place in the Rugby Championship.

On 18 October 2014, McKenzie resigned as the head coach of Australia. He left the Wallabies with 11 wins in 22 tests coached, for a winning percentage of just 50%. McKenzie left with a good winning record against European opposition, winning seven of eight tests played, the sole loss coming against England in November 2013. He also left with a good winning record against Argentina, with a 3–1 win–loss record. However, he left with a poor record against Rugby Championship opponents, failing to win a match against New Zealand and leaving with a 1–3 win–loss record against South Africa. On 22 October 2014, New South Wales Waratahs head coach Michael Cheika was appointed the new head coach of Australia, becoming Australia's third head coach in two years. In his first match as coach of Australia, Australia defeated the Barbarians 40–36 at Twickenham Stadium. On the 2014 end of year tour, Australia defeated Wales at the Millennium Stadium in Cardiff 33–28, delivering the Wallabies a 10th straight victory over the hosts in Michael Cheika's first Test as coach. The Wallabies, though, were outscored by four tries to three, with fly-half Bernard Foley kicking a late drop goal and three second-half penalties. The Wallabies lost the other three test matches on the tour against France, Ireland and England which dropped them to sixth place on the world rankings.

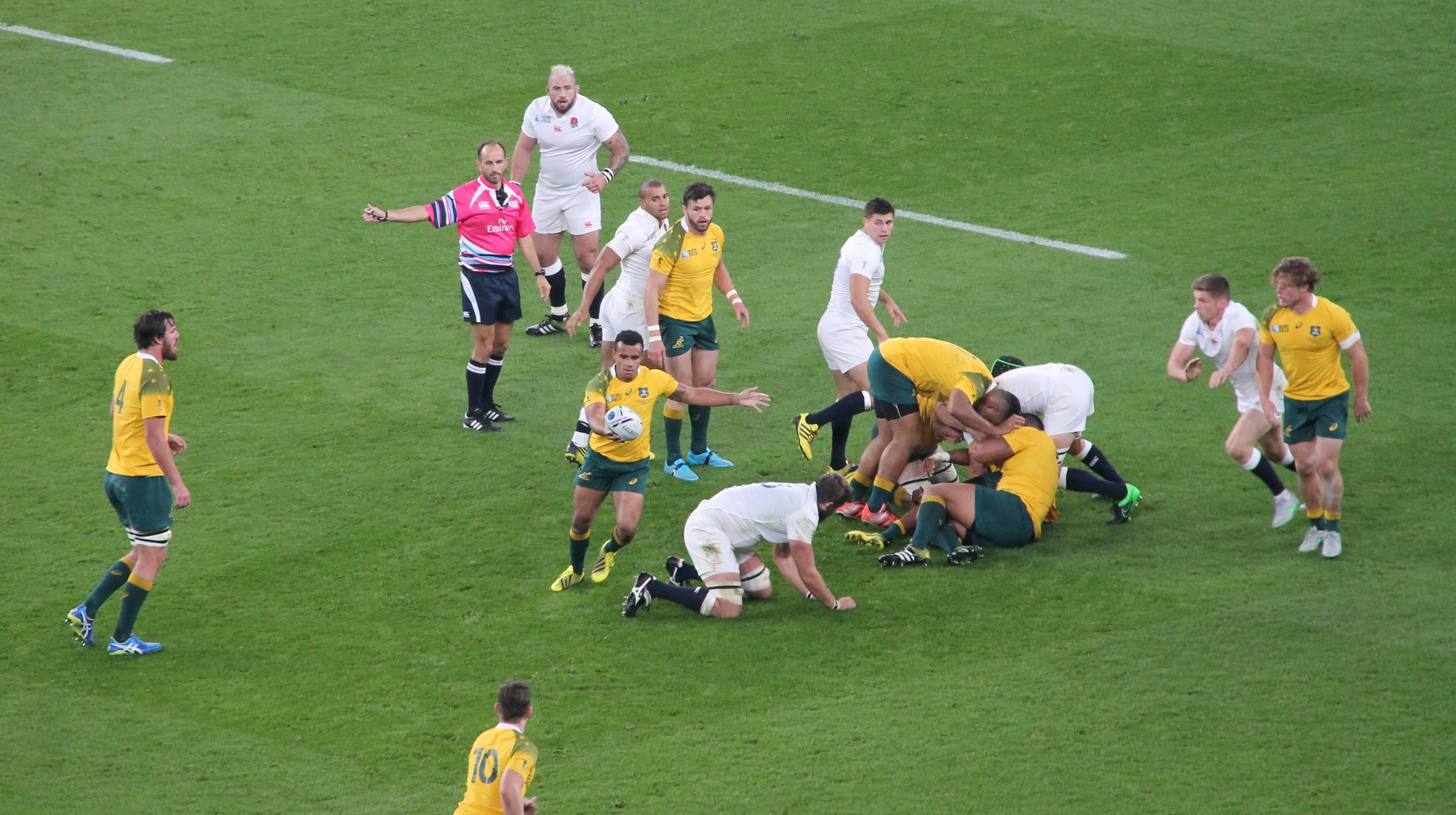
Australia against England at the 2015 Rugby World Cup; the Wallabies knocked the hosts out of tournament in a 13–33 victory at Twickenham Stadium en route to the final.

2015 was a good year for the Wallabies, winning a shortened Rugby Championship (due to the Rugby World Cup that year) by defeating South Africa (24–20), Argentina (9-34) and New Zealand (27–19). They failed to reclaim the Bledisloe Cup, however losing to their Trans-Tasman rivals the following week in Auckland 41–13. For the 2015 Rugby World Cup Australia was in "the pool of death" alongside Wales, Fiji, England and Uruguay. The Wallabies first match was against Fiji which Australia won 28–13, then Australia defeated Uruguay 65–3. In the third round Australia defeated England at Twickenham 33–13, eliminating the host nation from their own World Cup. In the last pool match Australia luckily defeated Wales 15–6. In the quarter-finals they scraped a "controversial" win over Scotland by 35–34. They then defeated Argentina in the semi-finals which took them to the final against New Zealand, which Australia lost 34–17.

2016 was the beginning of a downward trend in results for the Wallabies. In June Australia hosted a three-Test series against Six Nations winners England, coached by former Wallabies coach Eddie Jones. England won all three games, by 39–28, 23–7 and 44–40 respectively. Although finishing 2nd in that years Rugby Championship, with two wins over Argentina and one over South Africa, they lost both games against New Zealand plus the third Bledisloe test that year, continuing a miserable run against the All Blacks. In the end of year internationals, Australia managed wins against Wales 32–8, Scotland 23–22 and France 25–23, but lost to Ireland 27–24 before losing a fourth game against England by 37–21.

The following year saw little improvement. In the June internationals Australia secured wins against Fiji 37–14 and Italy 40–27, but lost against a Scotland side missing a number of players on duty for the British & Irish Lions tour. Their poor form continued into that years Rugby Championship where, despite again finishing 2nd, they only won their two games against Argentina, lost both matches against New Zealand and struggled to two draws against a poor South Africa. The Wallabies pulled off a surprise 23–18 win in the third Bledisloe test that year, but during the autumn test season they only achieved wins against Japan 63–30 and Wales 29–21 before suffering a fifth straight defeat to England 30–6 and a record-setting loss to Scotland of 53–24.

2018 was one of the worst years ever for Australian rugby. In the June series against Ireland, Australia won the first test 18–9, but lost the remaining matches 21–26 and 20–16 despite outscoring the Six Nations Grand Slam holders by five tries to three. The home series loss to Ireland was Australia's first against them since 1979. In that year's Rugby Championship Australia again lost both matches against New Zealand. They did secure a hard-fought 23–18 victory against South Africa in Round 2 but subsequently lost to Argentina at home for the first time since 1983, as well as the return fixture to South Africa 23–12. Their third win of the year was against Argentina where, despite losing the first half 31–7, the Wallabies pulled off an astonishing second-half comeback to win the match 45–34. In the final Bledisloe test, played at Yokohama stadium in Japan, the Wallabies were again trounced by New Zealand 37–20. That autumn, Australia suffered their first defeat to Wales in 10 years by 9–6. The scoreline of the Welsh game, as well as the result, exactly mirrored that of the first meeting between the sides 110 years earlier. They defeated Italy 26–7 the following week, before falling to a sixth defeat in a row to England by 37–18 the week after. The Wallabies finished 2018 having won only four games from thirteen tests played, marking that year as their worst run of results in the professional era, and their worst calendar year since 1958.

2019 was a World Cup year and saw some improvement from the previous campaign. Despite losing to South Africa 35–17 in Johannesburg, they defeated Argentina 16–10, and then surprised New Zealand with a thumping 47–26 win in Perth, equalling the then largest margin of defeat for the All Blacks in a test match. New Zealand reversed the result in the return match in Auckland, however, with a comprehensive 36–0 win to retain the Bledisloe Cup. At the 2019 Rugby World Cup Australia won three of their four pool matches against Fiji 39-21, Uruguay 45-10, and Georgia 27-8. However a close 29-25 loss to Wales led to a quarter-final against England. The Wallabies would lose 40-16 and resulted in a seventh straight defeat against England, still coached by Eddie Jones. The following day Cheika announced that he would resign as head coach by the end of the year. His contract had been due to expire following the World Cup. The Wallabies ended the decade placed sixth in the international rankings, a fall of three places from the beginning of the 2010s.

=== 2020s ===
2020 saw mixed results. Cheika was replaced by Dave Rennie as head coach and due to the COVID-19 pandemic the 2020 Super Rugby season was suspended after only 1 month of playing. This forced the cancellation of many fixtures against northern hemisphere teams, limiting Australia to playing New Zealand and Argentina in a reverted Tri-Nations outfit. In the first match of the Bledisloe Cup in Wellington, Australia tied 16–16 with New Zealand, the closest they had come to winning a match in New Zealand for 20 years. In the second match, New Zealand played a tougher game, with Australia having to try to break their 35-year drought at Eden Park. They were outclassed 27-7 despite being 3 points down at halftime. The third leg played in Sydney was a disaster, with the Wallabies going down 43–5, a record loss and the largest win in Bledisloe Cup history. Australia next played New Zealand at Suncorp Stadium in Brisbane, where they finally notched a 24–22 win. They next played Argentina twice, leading to two draws. 15-15 in Newcastle and 16-16 draw in Parramatta. The Wallabies finished 2020 at sixth in the world rankings.

2021 brought both highs and lows. The July internationals series saw France touring Australia, and as Sydney went into lockdown due to the pandemic, the first test was rescheduled to be played in Brisbane. The Wallabies opened with a 23–21 win, leapfrogging both France and Wales up to fifth in the world rankings. France responded with a 28–26 win in Melbourne, their first win in Australia since 1990. Play returned to Brisbane for the decider with the cumulative scores of the first two games 49—49. With 5 minutes remaining and the scores tied at 30-all, the series was on a knife's edge, but the final points were notched up with a penalty kick by Noah Lolesio, giving a 33–30 win and series win to the Wallabies. The massive challenge of back-to-back games at Eden Park for the Bledisloe Cup brought two losses, 25—33 for the first game, and a heavy 22–57 defeat in the opening Rugby Championship match. With New Zealand having already secured the cup for the 19th consecutive year, the All Blacks remained undefeated in the 2021 Bledisloe series as the Wallabies again went down 21–38 in Perth. However, things started to improve for the Wallabies for the rest of the Rugby Championship. Quade Cooper made a much-anticipated return to the Wallabies against South Africa at fly-half and produced a stellar performance, leading the Wallabies to a 28–26 win after kicking 8 from 8 off the tee. Australia followed this up with an even more convincing 30–17 win over the Springboks, launching them to third in world rankings behind the world champions South Africa, and New Zealand. Back-to-back wins against Argentina put the Wallabies second on the final table behind the All Blacks, with 4 consecutive wins in the Rugby Championship for the first time ever. During the Spring Tour, the Wallabies called up Tolu Latu, Will Skelton and Rory Arnold to help boost their forward pack. A surprise addition was Kurtley Beale, who was called in after an injury to Reece Hodge. Though the Wallabies won against Japan, they lost all their games in Britain, with close losses against Scotland and Wales, and a comprehensive defeat to England. This was the first time in 45 years that the Wallabies lost all games in a European tour. Australia finished the tour by falling to sixth in the world rankings, from a mid-year high of third in the world.

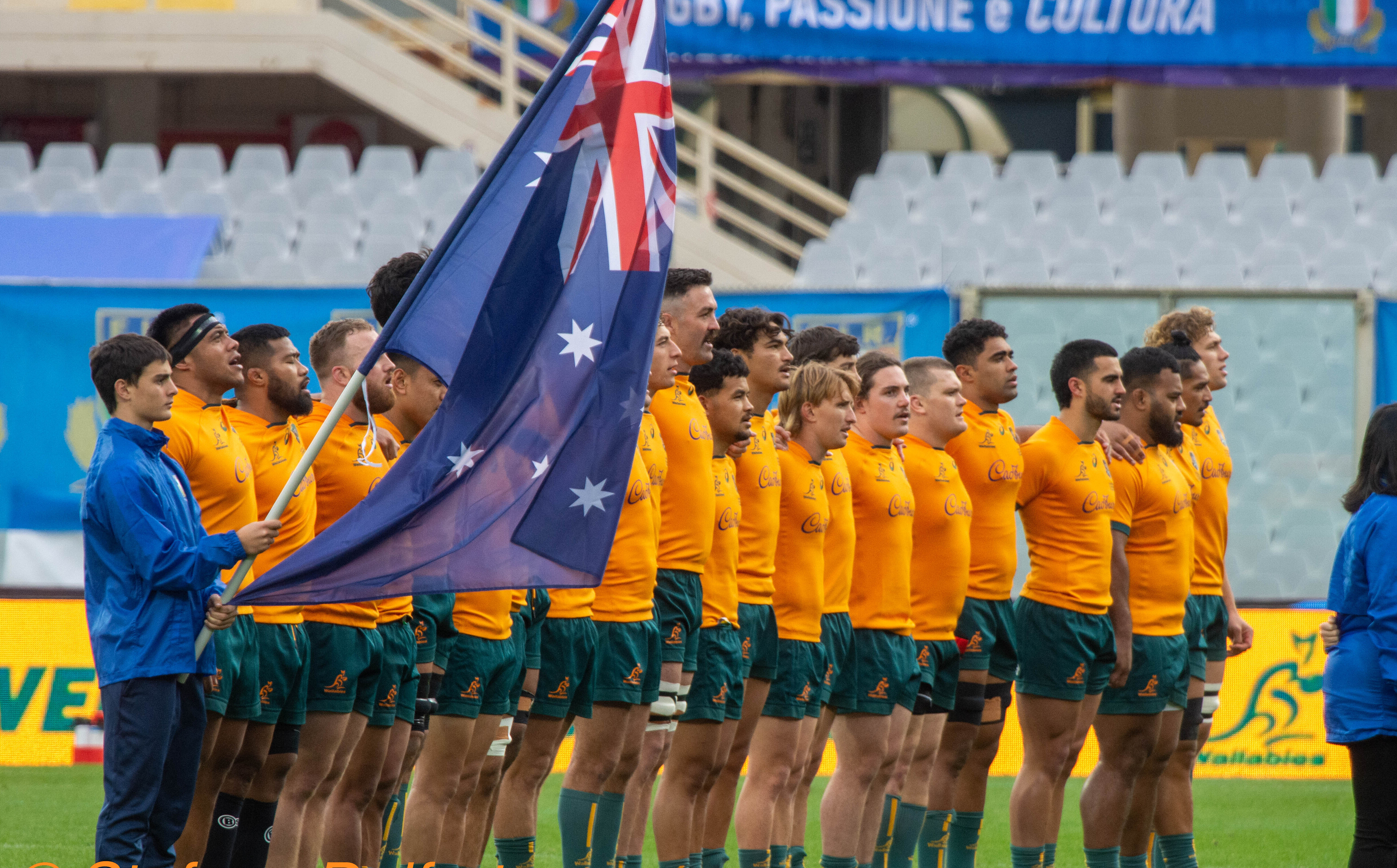
Australia lineup against Italy during the 2022 Autumn Internationals.

2022 was a hard year for the Wallabies. In the July test series against England, they won the opening game in Perth 30–28, their first victory against the English since 2015, but went on to lose the series losing 17–25 in Brisbane and 17–21 in Sydney. In their opening Rugby Championship match against Argentina, they were down 16–10 at halftime but made an astonishing comeback to win 26–41 in Mendoza, only for them to get thumped by the Pumas 48-17 the next week. Australia then defeated South Africa 25–17 in Adelaide, but got stunned the next week in Sydney by the Springboks losing 24–8. In September 2022, the Wallabies dropped to their lowest-ever World Rugby ranking after losing to the All Blacks in Melbourne. The team fell to ninth on World Rugby's rankings ladder. They sunk even lower after losing 40–14 to the All Blacks at Eden Park. The Wallabies managed a close win against Scotland at Murrayfield 15–16, but went on to lose to France 30–29, a stunning loss to Italy of 28–27 and another loss to Ireland of 13–10. The Wallabies were down 34–13 to Wales after 58 minutes of their last Test of the season, but pulled off an amazing comeback to finish a woeful season on a high 34–39. Despite this late victory, Rugby Australia made the decision to sack coach Dave Rennie and replace him with previous Wallabies coach Eddie Jones after he was sacked from the England job.

2023 would become the worst year for Australian rugby in decades. First the Wallabies lost all three matches of the shortened Rugby Championship, finishing last. The 2023 Rugby World Cup was a disaster for the Wallabies as they failed to make it past the group stage for the first time in their history. A loss to Fiji was followed by a record loss to Wales. Even though Australia finished level on points with Fiji, Fiji advanced due to winning the match between the two. Australia would win only two of nine Tests this year, against Georgia and Portugal. This poor performance saw Eddie Jones resign from his post to coach Japan, leaving the Wallabies to rebuild.

2024 started well for Australia, who beat Wales 25–16 in their first match of the year under new coach Joe Schmidt, who gave 7 debutants their first cap. Liam Wright was named the captain for this match, becoming the most inexperienced Australian captain since Ken Catchpole captained Australia in his debut against Fiji in 1961. In the second match, they won 36–28, and thus retained the James Bevan Trophy. The Wallabies then went on to beat Georgia 40–29, giving the team a 100% record in the 2024 mid-year rugby union tests for 2024. The 2024 Rugby Championship saw the Wallabies finish at last place - they lost to South Africa twice in a row at home, with both results being highly in favour of the visitors, despite improvements from the team in each match. They beat Argentina in a close victory in La Plata, but were destroyed 27–67, this result being the most points Australia had ever conceded in a rugby union match. The next match against the All Blacks was a tight affair - they were down 21–0 after 20 minutes, but the Wallabies had a spirited comeback that saw them fall just short of victory at 28-31 for James Slipper's 140th Test match, overtaking George Gregan as the Wallabies' most capped player. The next match in Wellington saw the Wallabies take a rare lead in New Zealand, leading 13-12 just before the break but the All Blacks scored on halftime to go into the sheds 19-13 - unfortunately, Australia fell apart after the break and lost 13–33. In Schmidt's first year in charge of the Wallabies, the Wallabies played 13 tests, winning 6 and losing 7.

In February 2025, it was confirmed that Schmidt would resign as head coach following the conclusion of the 2025 Rugby Championship. His decision was motivated by family reasons although he did suggest he would be willing to stay on in an advisory role. This decision meant Rugby Australia would be looking for their fifth coach in the six years. On 30 April 2025, Rugby Australia revealed that Schmidt would extend his tenure as coach of Australia into mid-2026, with Les Kiss to succeed him as head coach of Australia afterwards. In August 2025, having been 22–0 down to South Africa after 20 minutes in the opening round of the 2025 Rugby Championship, they went on to score 38 unanswered points in a 38–22 victory to win for the first time at Ellis Park Stadium since their 1963 tour of South Africa. Australia finished third overall in the 2025 Rugby Championship.

In November 2025, after playing fifteen Test matches in twenty-two weeks, Australia suffered a record tenth defeat in a calendar year when they lost 48–33 to France at the Stade de France during their 2025 Spring Tour (and surpassed their previous record of nine defeats in a calendar year in 2016). It also marked the first occasion since 1958 that Australia completed a four-Test tour of Europe without securing a victory.

== Jersey ==
The Wallabies play in Australia's traditional sporting colours of green and gold. Before there was a national jersey in place, the Wallabies would play in the jersey of the state the game was being held. The Australian Coat of Arms would often replace the state logo on the jersey, and a variety of these colours were used in a number of matches in the early 1900s.

During their first years, the colours of the Wallabies changed depending on the place where they played. Between 1899 and 1904, the team wore sky blue jersey in Sydney and maroon during their games in Brisbane. During 1905–07, their switched to a maroon and light blue striped shirt, then returning to the sky blue (1908–1928).

In 1928 governing bodies agreed that "the Australian amateur representative colours of green and gold, should be adopted".The following year the All Blacks came to Australia, and the jersey worn was emerald green with the Australian Coat of Arms; with green socks with bars on the top. The jersey remained mainly the same, with a few variations, throughout the 1930s. In the 1961 tour of South Africa, Australia wore the gold and green jersey for the first time, to avoid confusion with the Springboks colors.

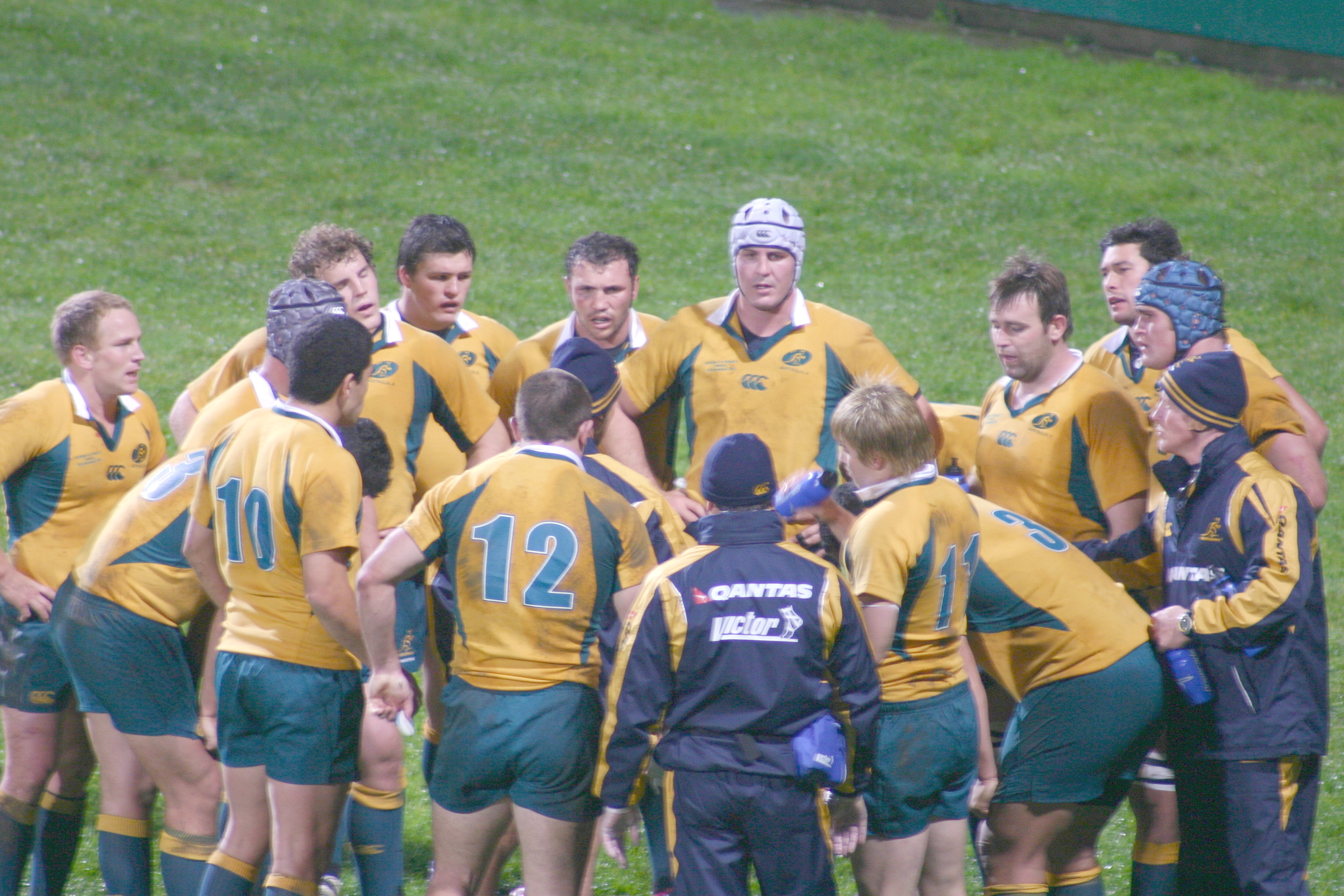
An Australian national rugby union team jersey used in the 2000s

The away jersey usually is green or white, although in the 1995 Rugby World Cup, the Wallabies wore in the match against Romania a green and gold hooped jersey, with green shorts and socks.

Canterbury's design for Australia's 2007 World cup jersey was controversial, featuring a curved tan-coloured panel across the chest resembling the shape of a bra. This led the Sydney Morning Herald's chief rugby correspondent to include a satirical piece in his column comparing it to Cosmo Kramer and Frank Costanza's infamous man bra from Seinfeld.

In 2010, KooGa became the apparel sponsor. The first KooGa jersey for the Wallabies under KooGa was used from 2010 through to the conclusion of the 2012 season, however, a different set of shorts and socks were made for the 2012 season. A new kit designed by KooGa was revealed in 2013 for the series against the British & Irish Lions. BLK Sport, previously the Australian subdivision of KooGa, became the apparel sponsor after that tour, with the BLK logo replacing the KooGa logo on the kit for the 2013 Spring Tour.

In October 2013, the ARU announced that Asics would be the apparel sponsor beginning in 2014. In the third 2017 Bledisloe Cup test, for the first time, the Wallabies played with an indigenous jersey. Cadbury became the major sponsor of the Wallabies in 2021, replacing Qantas as the front of jersey sponsor. In 2018 it was reported that Asics, the Wallabies' kit supplier, had renewed their deal until the end of 2025. In January 2026 the Wallabies entered a five-year deal with a new kit supplier, Castore. The Sydney Morning Herald reported, citing informed sources, that the "deal is comfortably the largest in its history."

Kit manufacturer
Period	Brand
1975–1988	Adidas
1989–1996	Canterbury
1997–1999	Reebok
2000–2009	Canterbury
2010–2013	KooGa
2010–2013	BLK (Note: BLK brand apparel was supplied for the 2013 end-of-year tour.)
2014–2025	Asics
2026–present	Castore

Jersey sponsor (Note: Sponsored logos appear on jerseys for matches other than the Rugby World Cup where branding, except for logos of equipment manufacturers, is not allowed.)
Brand	Period
None	to 1988
Ricoh	1988–1989
Castlemaine XXXX	1990–1994
Schweppes	1995–1997
Vodafone	1998–2003
Qantas	2004–2020
Cadbury	2021–present

== Nickname and mascot ==
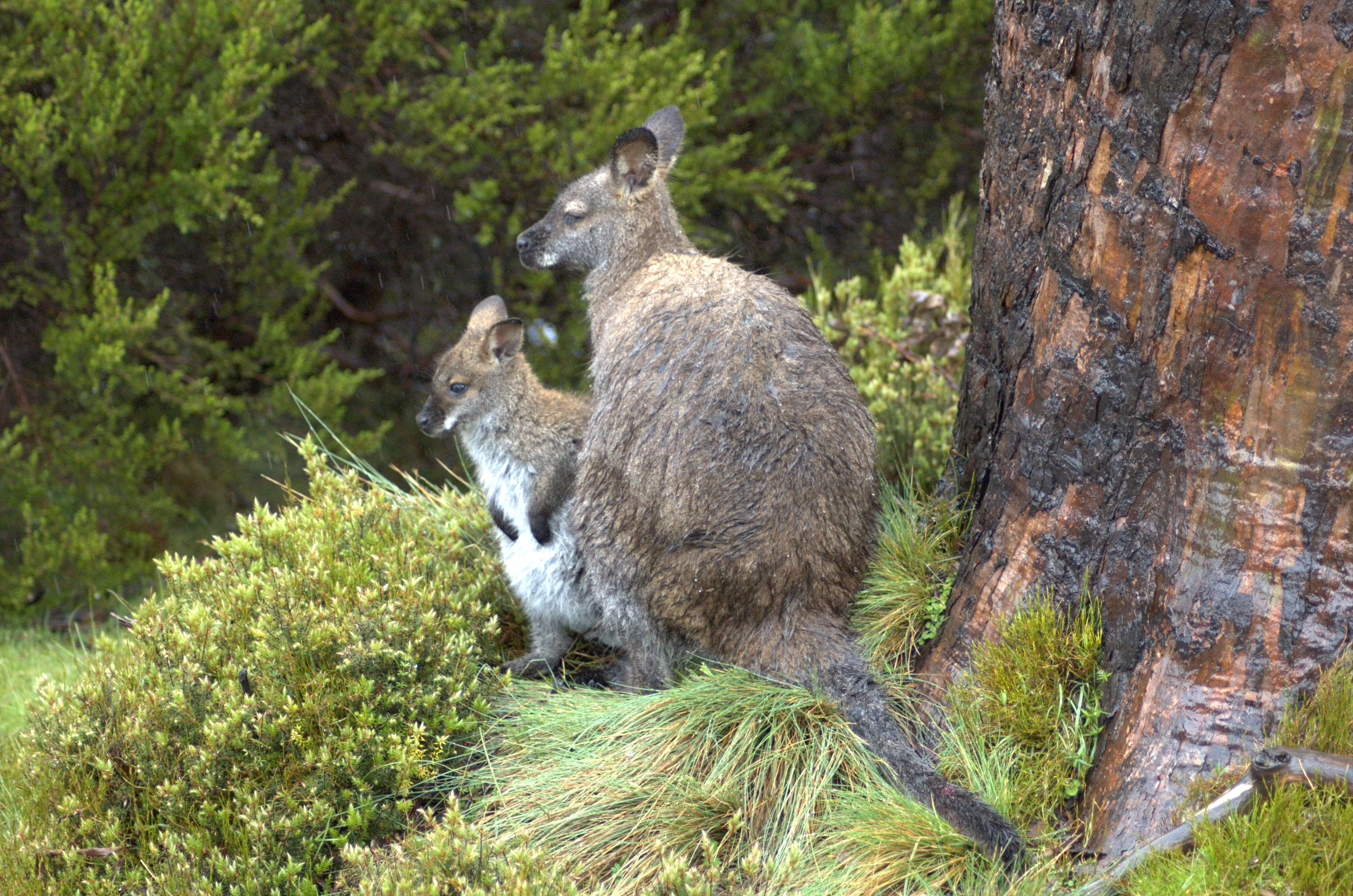
Wallabies in the wild

The nickname "Wallabies" is in reference to the wallaby, a marsupial that is widely distributed throughout Australia. The name has its origins during first United Kingdom and North America tour by the Australian team in 1908–09. New Zealand and South Africa had just completed tours in 1905–06 and 1907-08 where the British press dubbed them the "All Blacks" and "Springboks" respectively, and the same was expected of the Australian tour. At a pre-tour function in Sydney it was announced the Australian team would be called "the Rabbits", which British newspapers soon picked up on. The side played two matches on the way to England, but after arrival decided to hold a team meeting and vote to choose an alternative name to replace "Rabbits". The "Wallabies" was ultimately decided upon ahead of "Waratahs" (the NSW flower crest on the team jerseys), "Wallaroos" (Australia's first club to adopt rugby rules) and "Kangaroos" (per the badge on the 1905 and 1907 Australian team jerseys).

At first "Wallabies" only pertained to the 1908–09 squad, until the 1930s when it came into official and popular for all overseas tours by the national team. The fashion to call all Australian teams the "Wallabies", whether home or away, came in the wake of the success of the 1984 Grand Slam Wallabies tour.

The team mascot is known as Wally. The Wallabies Nunataks are named for the team.

== Record ==
Men's World Rugby Rankings Top 20 as of 16 November 2026
Rank	Change (Note: Change from the previous week)	Team	Points
1	Steady	South Africa	91.53
2	Steady	New Zealand	90.65
3	▲1	France	89.05
4	▼1	Ireland	88.70
5	Steady	England	86.99
6	Steady	Scotland	85.28
7	Steady	Australia	82.24
8	Steady	Argentina	82.09
9	▲1	Wales	79.37
10	▼1	Fiji	77.79
11	Steady	Italy	75.84
12	Steady	Japan	75.25
13	Steady	Georgia	74.23
14	▲1	United States	68.39
15	▼1	Portugal	68.24
16	▲3	Samoa	67.60
17	▲1	Chile	67.00
18	▼2	Spain	66.53
19	▼2	Tonga	65.58
20	Steady	Uruguay	65.17

**Australia's historical rankings**

Source: World Rugby
Graph updated to 16 November 2026

When the World Rankings were introduced in 2003, Australia was ranked fourth. Since then, the highest ranking Australia has achieved is second, and the lowest is tenth.

=== Rugby World Cup ===
Australia has appeared at every Rugby World Cup (RWC) since the first tournament in 1987. Australia was the first nation to win two World Cups, with victories in 1991 and 1999. They have progressed to four Rugby World Cup finals (tied with South Africa), one behind New Zealand's record of five.

In 1987, Australia co-hosted the inaugural Rugby World Cup with New Zealand. They were grouped with England, the United States and Japan in Pool A. In their first ever World Cup match, Australia defeated England 19–6 at Concord Oval in Sydney then went on to beat their other pool opponents to finish the top of their group and advance to the quarter-finals where they defeated Ireland 33–15. They were knocked out by France in the semi-finals, and then lost the third place match against Wales.

Coached by Bob Dwyer for the 1991 World Cup in Europe, Australia again finished at the top of their pool, defeating Western Samoa, Wales and Argentina during the group stages. They met Ireland in the quarter-finals, beating them by one point to go through to the semi-finals, where they defeated the All Blacks 16–6 to qualify for their first World Cup final. Australia beat England 12–6 at Twickenham in the 1991 Rugby World Cup Final to become world champions.

Australia were again automatically qualified for the 1995 World Cup in South Africa and finished second in their pool, losing one game to hosts South Africa. They were then knocked out in the quarter-finals by England. In the 2009 feature film Invictus based on the story of the 1995 tournament, Australia can be seen playing South Africa in one of the scenes.

Rod Macqueen was the Australian head coach for the 1999 World Cup in Wales. The team beat Ireland, Romania and the United States during the group stages and, after defeated hosts Wales in the quarter-finals, they turned the tables on defending champions South Africa, beating them 27–21 to make it to the final. There they defeated France 35 to 12, in the 1999 Rugby World Cup Final and becoming the first nation to win the World Cup twice.

Australia were the sole hosts of the tournament in 2003, and went undefeated in Pool A, beating Ireland, Argentina, Romania and Namibia. Australia defeated Scotland in the quarter-finals, and then the All Blacks in what was regarded as an upset in the semi-finals, to go to the final. England won the final in Sydney during extra time with a Jonny Wilkinson drop goal.

The 2007 World Cup in France was not a successful tournament for the Wallabies. While they finished on top of their group in the pool stages, Australia was knocked out by England 12–10 in their quarter-final, again largely due to Jonny Wilkinson's goal-kicking prowess. This loss was widely regarded as an upset, given England had only finished 2nd in their pool and were ranked 7th. Nevertheless, England went on to upset hosts France in their semi-final match, and advanced to the final where they were beaten by South Africa.

Rugby World Cup record									Qualification						
Year	Round	Pld	W	D	L	PF	PA	Squad	Pos	Pld	W	D	L	PF	PA
(New Zealand) (Australia) 1987	Fourth place	6	4	0	2	186	108	Squad	Invited						
(England) (France) (Ireland) (Scotland) (Wales) 1991	**Champions**	6	6	0	0	126	55	Squad	Automatically qualified						
(South Africa) 1995	Quarter-finals	4	2	0	2	109	66	Squad	Automatically qualified						
(Wales) 1999	**Champions**	6	6	0	0	221	73	Squad	1st	3	3	0	0	165	33
(Australia) 2003	Runners-up	7	6	0	1	345	78	Squad	Automatically qualified						
(France) 2007	Quarter-finals	5	4	0	1	225	53	Squad	Automatically qualified						
(New Zealand) 2011	Third place	7	5	0	2	211	95	Squad	Automatically qualified						
(England) 2015	Runners-up	7	6	0	1	222	118	Squad	Automatically qualified						
(Japan) 2019	Quarter-finals	5	3	0	2	152	108	Squad	Automatically qualified						
(France) 2023	Pool stage	4	2	0	2	90	91	Squad	Automatically qualified						
(Australia) 2027	Qualified as hosts								Automatically qualified						
(United States) 2031	To be determined								To be determined						
Total	—	57	44	0	13	1887	845	—	—	3	3	0	0	165	33
**Champions**; Runners–up; Third place; Fourth place; Home venue

=== Rugby Championship ===
Australia's main annual tournament is The Rugby Championship (formerly the Tri-Nations from 1996 to 2011), competing with New Zealand, South Africa and Argentina who joined in 2012. Australia has won the tournament four times; in 2000, 2001, 2011 and 2015. Within the Rugby Championship, Australia also competes for the Bledisloe Cup with New Zealand, the Mandela Challenge Plate with South Africa, and the Puma Trophy with Argentina.

Tri Nations Series (1996–2011; 2020)
Nation	Matches				Points			Bonus points	Table points	Titles won
Nation	P	W	D	L	PF	PA	PD	Bonus points	Table points	Titles won
New Zealand	76	52	0	24	2,054	1,449	+605	35	**243**	**11**
Australia	76	30	3	43	1,591	1,817	−226	34	**160**	**3**
South Africa	72	28	1	43	1,480	1,831	−351	24	**138**	**3**
Argentina	4	1	2	1	56	84	–28	0	**8**	**0**

Source: lassen.co.nz – Tri-Nations, Australia, New Zealand, South Africa

Bonus points given by T – 4W − 2D, for T table points, W games won and D games drawn.

Rugby Championship (since 2012)
Nation	Matches				Points			Bonus points	Table points	Titles won
Nation	P	W	D	L	PF	PA	PD	Bonus points	Table points	Titles won
New Zealand	69	55	2	12	2,313	1,348	+965	43	**268**	**9**
South Africa	69	37	4	28	1,845	1,534	+311	33	**185**	**3**
Australia	69	28	3	38	1,563	1,900	−337	16	**141**	**1**
Argentina	69	14	1	54	1,358	2,277	−919	16	**66**	**0**

Updated: 4 October 2025
Source: lassen.co.nz – TRC, Argentina, Australia, New Zealand, South Africa
Bonus points given by T – 4W − 2D, for T table points, W games won and D games drawn.

All-time Tri Nations Series and Rugby Championship Table (since 1996)
Nation	Matches				Points			Bonus points	Table points	Titles won
Nation	P	W	D	L	PF	PA	PD	Bonus points	Table points	Titles won
New Zealand	145	107	2	36	4,367	2,797	+1,570	78	**511**	**20**
South Africa	141	65	5	71	3,325	3,365	–40	57	**323**	**6**
Australia	145	58	6	81	3,154	3,717	–563	50	**301**	**4**
Argentina	73	15	3	55	1,414	2,361	–947	16	**74**	**0**

Updated: 4 October 2025
Bonus points given by T – 4W − 2D, for T table points, W games won and D games drawn.

=== Nations Championship ===
Beginning in 2026, Australia began competing in the Nations Championship, a biennial tournament featuring the Northern Hemisphere teams in the Six Nations Championship competing against the four Southern Hemisphere teams in The Rugby Championship alongside invited teams Fiji and Japan. The tournament replaced the mid-year and end-of-year rugby Tests that were held annually since 2001, and holds a finals venue in one location. Promotion and relegation is scheduled to be introduced in 2030.

Nations Championship record
Year	Place	Pld	W	D	L	PF	PA
2026	TBD						
2028	TBD						
2030	TBD						
Total	TBD						
**Champions**; Runners-up; Third place; Fourth place; Home venue

=== Series played ===
Australia's home and away series played total
Team	Series stats					Home series	Away series
Team	P	W	D	L	%	Home series	Away series
British & Irish Lions	9	1	0	8	11.11	1899, 1904, 1950, 1959, 1966, 1989, **2001**, 2013, 2025	
New Zealand	31	6	1	24	19.35	1907, 1910, 1914, **1929**, 1932, **1934**, 1938, 1947, 1951, 1957, 1962, 1968, 1974, **1980**, 1984, 1988, **1992**	1913, 1936, 1946, **1949**, 1952, 1955, 1958, 1962, 1964, 1972, 1978, 1982, **1986**, 1990
South Africa	10	2	1	7	20.00	1937, 1956, **1965**, 1971, **1993**	1933, 1953, 1961, 1963, 1969
Fiji	5	3	2	0	60.00	1952, 1954, **1961**, **1976**, **1985**	
France	13	7	3	3	53.85	1972, **1981**, **1990**, **1997**, **2002**, **2008**, **2014**, **2021**	1971, 1976, 1983, 1989, 1993
Tonga	1	0	1	0	0.00	1973	
England (Note: Early in the history between the Home Nations meetings with Australia and the southern hemisphere teams (typically Australia, New Zealand and South Africa), Australia would play a one-off match in a tour against one, two, three or all four Home Nations teams. These were considered a tour and not a series.)	6	3	1	2	50.00	**1975**, **1988**, **2006**, 2010, 2016, 2022	
Japan	1	1	0	0	100.00	**1975**	
Wales	5	5	0	0	100.00	**1978**, **1996**, **2007**, **2012**, **2024**	
Ireland	4	2	0	2	50.00	1979, **1994**, **1999**, 2018	
Argentina	8	4	3	1	50.00	1983, **1986**, **1995**, **2000**	1979, 1987, 1997, **2026**
Scotland	5	4	1	0	80.00	1982, **1992**, **1998**, **2004**	**2004**
Canada	1	1	0	0	100.00	**1985**	
Italy	2	2	0	0	100.00	**1994**, **2009**	
Total	101	41	13	47	40.59	**Bold text** denotes series was won by Australia; Italic text denotes series was drawn	

=== Overall ===
Below is a summary of the Test Matches played by Australia up until 11 November 2026:

Opponent	Played	Won	Lost	Drawn	Win%	For	Aga	Diff
Argentina	45	31	10	4	69%	1,239	886	+353
British & Irish Lions	26	7	19	0	27%	315	482	–167
Canada	6	6	0	0	100%	283	60	+223
England	58	27	30	1	47%	1,226	1,137	+89
Fiji	24	20	3	1	83%	686	309	+377
France	53	29	22	2	55%	1,177	1,023	+154
Georgia	3	3	0	0	100%	102	52	+50
Ireland	40	22	17	1	55%	815	649	+166
Italy	20	18	2	0	90%	677	305	+372
Japan	7	7	0	0	100%	334	126	+208
South Korea	1	1	0	0	100%	65	18	+47
Namibia	1	1	0	0	100%	142	0	+142
New Zealand	183	45	130	8	25%	2,682	4,146	–1,464
New Zealand XV	24	6	18	0	25%	257	459	–202
Māori	16	8	6	2	50%	240	203	+37
Pacific Islanders	1	1	0	0	100%	29	14	+15
Portugal	1	1	0	0	100%	34	14	+20
Romania	3	3	0	0	100%	189	20	+169
Russia	1	1	0	0	100%	68	22	+46
Samoa	6	5	1	0	83%	238	53	+185
Scotland	35	22	13	0	63%	814	520	+294
South Africa	98	42	53	3	43%	1,774	2,013	–239
South Africa XV	3	0	3	0	0%	30	69	–39
Spain	1	1	0	0	100%	92	10	+82
Tonga	4	3	1	0	75%	167	42	+125
United States	8	8	0	0	100%	368	78	+290
Uruguay	2	2	0	0	100%	110	13	+97
Wales	49	34	14	1	69%	1,190	830	+360
Total	719	354	342	23	49.24%	15,353	13,553	+1,771

=== Trophies ===
Australia contests a number of other trophies against tier one teams from the Northern Hemisphere. The Trophée des Bicentenaires has been contested with France since 1989; the Ella–Mobbs Trophy (formerly the Cook Cup) with England since 1997; the Hopetoun Cup with Scotland since 1998; the Lansdowne Cup with Ireland since 1999; and the James Bevan Trophy with Wales since 2007.

Trophy	Played against	First contested	Holder	Last won	Trophy leader (wins)
Bledisloe Cup	New Zealand	2 July 1932	New Zealand	3 August 2002	New Zealand (54)
Trophée des Bicentenaires	France	4 November 1989	France	17 July 2021	Australia (14)
Ella–Mobbs Trophy (Note: Formerly known as the "Cook Cup".)	England	23 July 1997	England	10 November 2024	England (14)
Hopetoun Cup	Scotland	13 June 1998	Scotland	29 October 2022	Australia (8)
Lansdowne Cup	Ireland	12 June 1999	Ireland	16 November 2013	Ireland (9)
Mandela Challenge Plate	South Africa	8 July 2000	Australia	27 September 2026	Australia (14)
Puma Trophy	Argentina	17 June 2000	Australia	6 September 2026	Australia (14)
James Bevan Trophy	Wales	26 May 2007	Australia	13 July 2024	Australia (12)
Vuvale Bowl	Fiji	6 July 2025 (Note: The Vuvale Bowl was originally known as the "Kava Bowl" and was first contested in 1984. The trophy was returned to the Fiji Rugby Union (FRU) and renamed as the "Vuvale Bowl" before being contested in 2025.)	Australia	6 July 2025	Australia (2)

==== Former trophies ====
Trophy	Played against	First contested	Holder	Last won	Trophy leader (wins)
Tom Richards Cup	British and Irish Lions	30 June 2001	British and Irish Lions	14 July 2001	draw

== Players ==
=== Selection policy ===
Until 2015, the only players eligible for national selection had to be Australian-based. All overseas-based Australian players were not eligible to represent the Wallabies. Since 2022, three overseas-based players could be selected per series or tournament if they had 30 Test caps for Australia, and had played five years in the Super Rugby.

In 2015, several selection policy changes were made by the Australian Rugby Union (ARU), giving a select few number of overseas-based players the chance to represent Australia if they had served time in the Super Rugby (seven years) and the national team (60 caps). These policy changes were dubbed "Giteau's law". In 2020, the Giteau's law policy had been widened to include any player based overseas who did not meet the original threshold of 60 Test caps and seven years in the Super Rugby. However, any such selections must've be made in consultation with the Super Rugby franchises and receive Rugby Australia board approval, ensuring players already based in Australia are not disadvantaged. Eligibility was also restricted to World Rugby's designated international windows, which, for 2020, did not coincide with the Rugby Championship in November and December.

In February 2022, Australia's selection policy had slightly changed again, lowering the 60 Test caps and seven years in the Super Rugby eligibility to 30 Test caps and five years, respectively. Only three players per per series or tournament who fulfilled these criteria were allowed for selection. This has remained Australia's overseas-based selection policy since.

=== Current squad ===
On 23 October, Australia named a 33-player squad ahead of the 2026 Nations Championship Northern Hemisphere Series.

Head coach: (Australia) Les Kiss

- Caps updated: 15 November 2026 (after Scotland v Australia)

Player	Position	Date of birth (age)	Caps	Club/province
Josh Nasser	Hooker	23 June 1999 (age 27)	19	(Australia) Reds
Brandon Paenga-Amosa	Hooker	25 December 1995 (age 30)	33	(Australia) Force
Billy Pollard	Hooker	9 December 2001 (age 24)	28	(Australia) Brumbies
Allan Alaalatoa	Prop	28 January 1994 (age 32)	97	(Australia) Brumbies
Angus Bell	Prop	4 October 2000 (age 26)	62	(Australia) Waratahs
Massimo de Lutiis	Prop	18 November 2003 (age 23)	5	(Australia) Reds
Isaac Aedo Kailea	Prop	13 July 2000 (age 26)	11	(Australia) Waratahs
Tom Lambert	Prop	20 November 2000 (age 26)	0	(Australia) Reds
Taniela Tupou	Prop	10 May 1996 (age 30)	76	(France) Racing 92
Miles Amatosero	Lock	15 June 2002 (age 24)	2	(Australia) Waratahs
Josh Canham	Lock	1 February 2001 (age 25)	11	(Australia) Reds
Lukhan Salakaia-Loto	Lock	19 September 1996 (age 30)	51	(Australia) Reds
Lachlan Shaw	Lock	15 May 2003 (age 23)	7	(Australia) Brumbies
Jeremy Williams	Lock	2 December 2000 (age 25)	37	(Australia) Force
Tom Hooper	Back row	29 January 2001 (age 25)	26	(England) Exeter Chiefs
Fraser McReight	Back row	19 February 1999 (age 27)	51	(Australia) Reds
Carlo Tizzano	Back row	2 February 2000 (age 26)	19	(Australia) Force
Rob Valetini	Back row	3 September 1998 (age 28)	73	(Australia) Brumbies
Harry Wilson (c)	Back row	22 November 1999 (age 27)	47	(Australia) Reds
Ryan Lonergan	Scrum-half	6 April 1998 (age 28)	17	(Australia) Brumbies
Tate McDermott	Scrum-half	18 September 1998 (age 28)	59	(Australia) Reds
Teddy Wilson	Scrum-half	25 February 2003 (age 23)	0	(Australia) Waratahs
Ben Donaldson	Fly-half	4 April 1999 (age 27)	29	(Australia) Force
Carter Gordon	Fly-half	29 January 2001 (age 25)	14	(Australia) Reds
Declan Meredith	Fly-half	28 June 1999 (age 27)	6	(Australia) Brumbies
Isaac Henry	Centre	8 March 1999 (age 27)	7	(Australia) Reds
Len Ikitau	Centre	1 October 1998 (age 28)	59	(Australia) Brumbies
Hunter Paisami	Centre	10 April 1998 (age 28)	39	(Japan) Shizuoka Blue Revs
Joseph-Aukuso Sua'ali'i	Centre	1 August 2003 (age 23)	29	(Australia) Waratahs
Filipo Daugunu	Wing	4 March 1995 (age 31)	27	(Australia) Reds
Max Jorgensen	Wing	2 September 2004 (age 22)	32	(Australia) Waratahs
Harry Potter	Wing	15 December 1997 (age 28)	19	(Australia) Waratahs
Tom Wright	Fullback	21 July 1997 (age 29)	55	(Australia) Brumbies

=== Notable players ===
As of August 2026, the Wallabies have sixteen former players (and two former coaches) in the World Rugby Hall of Fame, which was previously known as the IRB Hall of Fame prior to 2015.

Australians in the World Rugby Hall of Fame (year of induction in brackets):

Wallabies players

- John Eales (2007)
- Nick Farr-Jones (2011)
- Nick Shehadie (2011)
- David Campese (2013)
- Ken Catchpole (2013)
- Mark Ella (2013)
- George Gregan (2013)
- Thomas Lawton, Snr (2013)

- John Thornett (2013)
- Michael Lynagh (2014)
- Tim Horan (2015)
- Tom Richards (2015)
- Daniel Carroll (2016)
- Stephen Larkham (2018)
- George Smith (2023)
- Matthew Burke (2025)

Coaches and administrators

- Bob Dwyer (2011)
- Rod Macqueen (2011)
- Roger Vanderfield (2011)

The two World Cup-winning captains, John Eales and Nick Farr-Jones, were among the first Australians to be inducted. Eales received this honour in 2007. Farr-Jones and another former Wallaby captain, Nick Shehadie, were inducted in 2011. Shehadie was honoured not as a player but recognised, together with fellow Australian Rugby administrator Roger Vanderfield, as one of four key figures in the creation of the Rugby World Cup. World Cup-winning coaches Bob Dwyer and Rod Macqueen were also inducted in 2011.

Six former Wallaby greats with combined playing careers spanning almost nine decades – Tom Lawton Snr, John Thornett, Ken Catchpole, Mark Ella, David Campese and George Gregan – were added to the list of Australians in the IRB Hall of Fame in 2013.

Lawton, a fly-half whose international career spanned from 1920 to 1932, was noted for his ball-handling and kicking skills, and most notably led Australia to their first-ever clean sweep of the Bledisloe Cup series, in 1929. Thornett, a forward who played in four different positions for the Wallabies, made his international debut in 1955. He earned 35 caps in a 12-year Test career, and captained the Wallabies 15 times. During Australia's drawn 1963 Test series against South Africa, in which he served as captain, the Wallabies became the first team in the 20th century to win consecutive Tests over the Springboks.

Gregan, a World Cup-winning scrum-half whose Test career spanned the amateur and professional eras of the sport (1994–2007), is notable as having been the all-time caps leader in international rugby union, with 139 in all (a record since surpassed by Brian O'Driscoll of Ireland). He also captained the Wallabies in 59 Tests.

A further two World Cup winners, Michael Lynagh and Tim Horan, were inducted in 2014 and 2015 respectively when the separate New Zealand-based International Rugby Hall of Fame was merged with the IRB's Hall of Fame.

Wallabies and Olympic gold medallists from the 1908 tour of the United Kingdom, Tom Richards and Daniel Carroll, were honoured with inductions in 2015 and 2016. Both of these men went on to become dual internationals in rugby with Richards playing for the 1910 British Lions and Carroll winning further Olympic gold playing for United States in 1920. Both men also received awards for gallantry during their military service in World War I.

Fly-half Stephen Larkham, a World Cup winner in 1999 and renowned for his drop goal to beat South Africa in the semi-final of that tournament, was admitted to the World Rugby Hall of Fame in 2018.

Flanker and 111-cap Wallaby George Smith was inducted into the World Rugby Hall of Fame in 2023. Fullback and 1999 Rugby World Cup winner Matthew Burke was inducted into the World Rugby Hall of Fame in 2025.

=== Individual records ===
Prop James Slipper is Australia's most capped player with 154 Test caps. Former scrum half George Gregan was also the world's most capped player until being surpassed by Ireland's Brian O'Driscoll in 2014. Gregan also equalled the record for the most caps as captain with Will Carling, 59 caps (a record later to be broken by John Smit of South Africa). David Campese scored 64 Test tries in his career, which was a world record until Daisuke Ohata of Japan overtook him with 69 tries, and Michael Lynagh was the highest Test points scorer in world rugby with 911 until Neil Jenkins of Wales overtook him with 1037 points. Rocky Elsom scored the fastest forward hat-trick in World Cup history.

The longest winning streak by Australia was produced in the early 1990s, and started at the 1991 World Cup in England, with three pool wins, and subsequent quarter-final and semi-final victories over Ireland and the All Blacks respectively. This was followed by the win over England in the final. The streak continued into the following year, for two matches against Scotland and the All Blacks, lasting in total, 10 games. Similarly, the Australian record for losses in a row is also 10 games, which was sustained from a period from 1899 to 1907, including two British Isles tours, and losses to the All Blacks.

The largest winning margin for Australia was produced at the 2003 World Cup, in which they defeated Namibia 142 points to nil during the pool stages, the match is also the largest number of points scored by Australia. The largest loss was against South Africa, who beat Australia 53–8 in the 2008 Tri Nations Series.

=== Award winners ===
The following Australia players have been recognised at the World Rugby Awards since 2001:

World Rugby Player of the Year
Year	Nominees	Winners
2001	George Gregan	—
2001	George Smith	—
2003	Phil Waugh	—
2004	Matt Giteau	—
2006	Chris Latham	—
2009	Matt Giteau (2)	—
2010	Kurtley Beale	—
2010	David Pocock	—
2011	Will Genia	—
2011	David Pocock (2)	—
2015	Michael Hooper	—
2015	David Pocock (3)	—
2017	Israel Folau	—
2021	Michael Hooper (2)	—
2021	Samu Kerevi	—

World Rugby Breakthrough Player of the Year
Year	Nominees	Winners
2021	Andrew Kellaway	—
2025	Joseph-Aukuso Sua'ali'i	—

World Rugby Dream Team of the Year
Year	No.	Players
2021	7.	Michael Hooper
2021	12.	Samu Kerevi
2022	11.	Marika Koroibete
2025	8.	Harry Wilson
2025	12.	Len Ikitau

World Rugby Try of the Year
Year	Date	Scorer	Match	Tournament
2011	27 August	Radike Samo	vs. New Zealand	Tri Nations

== Coaches ==
=== Coaching staff ===
As of August 2026

Position	Name
Head coach	Les Kiss
Assistant coach	Jonny Fisher
Defence coach	Scott McLeod
Forwards coach	Tom Donnelly
Scrum coach	John Ulugia
Skills coach	Eoin Toolan

=== Coaches ===
Prior to 1982, Australia did not select coaches as long-term appointments. Managers were appointed to handle the logistics of overseas tours and the assistant manager often doubled as the coach for the duration of the trip. Sometimes the team captain filled the Australian coaching role, particularly for home tests since the IRB had ruled that home teams could not be assembled until three days before a test match.

Name	Tenure	Tests	Won	Drawn	Lost	Win Rate %	
Bob Dwyer	1982–1983	12	5	1	6	41.67%	63.01%
Bob Dwyer	1988–1995	61	41	1	19	67.21%	63.01%
Alan Jones	1984–1987	30	21	1	8	70.00%	
Greg Smith	1996–1997	19	12	0	7	63.16%	
Rod Macqueen	1997–2001	43	34	1	8	79.07%	
Eddie Jones	2001–2005	57	33	1	23	57.89%	53.03%
Eddie Jones	2023	9	2	0	7	22.22%	53.03%
John Connolly	2006–2007	25	16	1	8	64.00%	
Robbie Deans	2008–2013	75	44	2	29	58.67%	
Ewen McKenzie	2013–2014	22	11	1	10	50.00%	
Michael Cheika	2014–2019	68	34	2	32	50.00%	
Dave Rennie	2019–2023	34	13	3	18	36.40%	
Joe Schmidt	2024–2026	31	12	0	19	38.70%	
Les Kiss	2026–	10	5	1	4	50.00%	
Updated: 22 November 2026

== Home venues ==
As of 4 October 2025

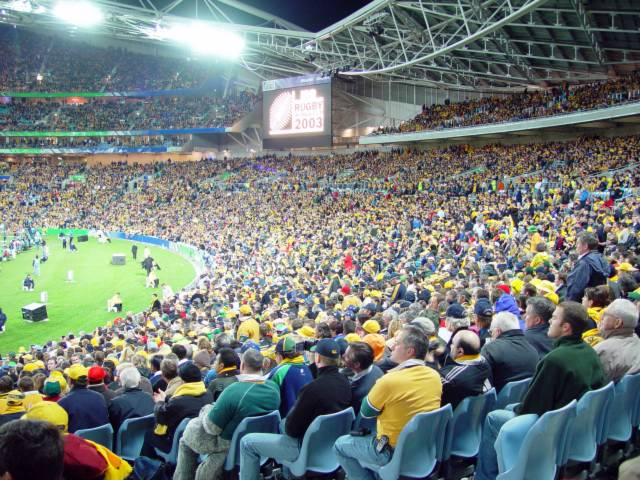
The opening match of the 2003 World Cup at Telstra Stadium.

The Wallabies play at a variety of stadiums around Australia. Some of these include Stadium Australia in Sydney, Lang Park in Brisbane, AAMI Park and Docklands Stadium in Melbourne, and Optus Stadium and nib Stadium in Perth. A variety of venues were used around Australia for the 2003 Rugby World Cup matches. Some of the earlier stadiums that were traditionally used for Wallabies matches, included Sydney's Concord Oval and the Sydney Cricket Ground (SCG) and Sports Ground, as well as Ballymore and the Exhibition Ground in Brisbane. It was the SCG that hosted the first ever Australian international, against Great Britain, in 1899.

Stadium	Location	State	Pld	W	D	L	W%	First match	Last match	Map
Sydney Cricket Ground	Moore Park, Sydney	New South Wales	68	30	3	35	44.1	1899	2022	Australia national rugby union team is located in Australia
Stadium Australia	Sydney Olympic Park, Sydney	New South Wales	41	24	1	16	58.5	1999	2025	Australia national rugby union team is located in Australia
~~Ballymore Stadium~~	Herston, Brisbane	Queensland	41	30	2	9	73.2	1968	2000	Australia national rugby union team is located in Australia
Lang Park (Brisbane Stadium)	Milton, Brisbane	Queensland	40	28	1	11	70.0	1965	2025	Australia national rugby union team is located in Australia
~~Sydney Football Stadium (1988)~~	Moore Park, Sydney	New South Wales	27	19	0	8	70.4	1989	2018	Australia national rugby union team is located in Australia
~~Sydney Showground~~	Moore Park, Sydney	New South Wales	15	4	0	11	26.7	1921	1926	Australia national rugby union team is located in Australia
Docklands Stadium	Docklands, Melbourne	Victoria	14	11	0	3	78.6	2000	2022	Australia national rugby union team is located in Australia
~~Subiaco Oval~~	Subiaco, Perth	Western Australia	14	10	1	3	71.4	1998	2014	Australia national rugby union team is located in Australia
Brisbane Exhibition Ground	Bowen Hills, Brisbane	Queensland	13	3	0	10	23.1	1899	1971	Australia national rugby union team is located in Australia
Concord Oval	Concord, Sydney	New South Wales	8	4	0	4	50.0	1987	1988	Australia national rugby union team is located in Australia
~~Sydney Sports Ground~~	Moore Park, Sydney	New South Wales	7	1	0	6	14.3	1914	1963	Australia national rugby union team is located in Australia
The Gabba	Woolloongabba, Brisbane	Queensland	6	1	0	5	16.7	1907	2002	Australia national rugby union team is located in Australia
Canberra Stadium	Bruce, Canberra	Australian Capital Territory	5	5	0	0	100.0	1998	2017	Australia national rugby union team is located in Australia
Melbourne Cricket Ground	East Melbourne, Melbourne	Victoria	5	2	0	3	40.0	1997	2025	Australia national rugby union team is located in Australia
Melbourne Rectangular Stadium	East Melbourne, Melbourne	Victoria	5	2	0	3	40.0	2016	2024	Australia national rugby union team is located in Australia
Perth Stadium	Burswood, Perth	Western Australia	5	2	0	3	40.0	2019	2025	Australia national rugby union team is located in Australia
Western Sydney Stadium	Parramatta, Sydney	New South Wales	4	2	0	2	50.0	2019	2023	Australia national rugby union team is located in Australia
Sydney Football Stadium (2022)	Moore Park, Sydney	New South Wales	4	2	0	2	50.0	2022	2025	Australia national rugby union team is located in Australia
Robina Stadium	Robina, Gold Coast	Queensland	3	3	0	0	100.0	2012	2018	Australia national rugby union team is located in Australia
Adelaide Oval	North Adelaide, Adelaide	South Australia	3	3	0	0	100.0	2003	2022	Australia national rugby union team is located in Australia
Newcastle International Sports Centre	New Lambton, Newcastle	New South Wales	3	1	1	1	33.3	2012	2025	Australia national rugby union team is located in Australia
North Queensland Stadium	Railway Estate, Townsville	Queensland	2	2	0	0	100.0	2021	2025	Australia national rugby union team is located in Australia
~~Olympic Park Stadium~~	East Melbourne, Melbourne	Victoria	2	1	1	0	50.0	1961	1994	Australia national rugby union team is located in Australia
Perth Rectangular Stadium	Perth	Western Australia	2	1	1	0	50.0	2016	2017	Australia national rugby union team is located in Australia
~~Parramatta Stadium~~	Parramatta, Sydney	New South Wales	1	1	0	0	100.0	1998		Australia national rugby union team is located in Australia
University Oval	Camperdown, Sydney	New South Wales	1	0	0	1	0.0	1921		Australia national rugby union team is located in Australia

=== All time records at locations and states/territories ===
Ground	First Test	Last Test	P	W	D	L	Win %	Last Loss
(New South Wales) Sydney	24 June 1899 v British & Irish Lions	13 September 2025 v Argentina	175	86	5	84	49.14	13 September 2025 v Argentina
(Queensland) Brisbane	22 July 1899 v British & Irish Lions	19 July 2025 v British & Irish Lions	100	62	3	35	62.00	19 July 2025 v British & Irish Lions
(Victoria (state)) Melbourne	1 July 1961 v Fiji	26 July 2025 v British & Irish Lions	26	16	1	9	61.54	26 July 2025 v British & Irish Lions
(Western Australia) Perth	18 July 1998 v South Africa	4 October 2025 v New Zealand	21	13	2	6	61.90	4 October 2025 v New Zealand
(Australian Capital Territory) Canberra	22 September 1998 v Tonga	16 September 2017 v Argentina	5	5	0	0	100.00	N/A
(South Australia) Adelaide	25 October 2003 v Namibia	27 August 2022 v South Africa	3	3	0	0	100.00	N/A
(New South Wales) Newcastle	5 June 2012 v Scotland	6 July 2025 v Fiji	3	1	1	1	33.33	5 June 2012 v Scotland
(Queensland) Gold Coast	15 September 2012 v Argentina	2 November 2021 v Argentina	5	4	0	1	80.00	15 September 2018 v Argentina
(Queensland) Townsville	25 September 2021 v Argentina	6 September 2025 v Argentina	2	2	0	0	100.00	N/A

State	First Test	Last Test	P	W	D	L	Win %	Last Loss
Australian Capital Territory	22 September 1998 v Tonga	16 September 2017 v Argentina	5	5	0	0	100.00	N/A
New South Wales	24 June 1899 v British & Irish Lions	13 September 2025 v Argentina	178	87	6	85	48.88	13 September 2025 v Argentina
Queensland	22 July 1899 v British & Irish Lions	19 July 2025 v British & Irish Lions	106	67	3	36	63.21	19 July 2025 v British & Irish Lions
South Australia	25 October 2003 v Namibia	27 August 2022 v South Africa	3	3	0	0	100.00	N/A
Victoria	1 July 1961 v Fiji	26 July 2025 v British & Irish Lions	26	16	1	9	61.54	26 July 2025 v British & Irish Lions
Western Australia	18 July 1998 v South Africa	4 October 2025 v New Zealand	21	13	2	6	61.90	4 October 2025 v New Zealand

== Broadcasters ==
Broadcasts of Rugby World Cups in Australia (by broadcaster)
Year	Pay-TV	Free-to-air			
Year	Fox Sports (Kayo Sports)	ABC	Seven	Nine (Stan Sport)	10
1987		Yes			
1991		Yes			
1995					Yes
1999	Yes		Yes		
2003	Yes		Yes		
2007	Yes				Yes
2011	Yes			Yes	
2015	Yes			Yes	
2019	Yes				Yes
2023				Yes	
2027				Yes	
2031	To be determined.				

Due to Australia's anti-siphoning laws every Rugby World Cup (RWC) Australia has participated in has been held, exclusively or in part, on a free-to-air (FTA) broadcasting network.

Before the advent of professionalism, Australia's internationals and spring tours were televised by the Australian Broadcasting Corporation (1957–1991). The first commercial broadcaster to partner with the Wallabies was Network Ten in 1992. The partnership ran until 1995 and saw the broadcaster televise the third edition of the Rugby World Cup (RWC) (1995), held in South Africa for the first time. In 1995 the SANZAR unions (Australian Rugby Union (ARU), New Zealand Rugby Union (NZRU) and the South African Rugby Union) signed a US$550 million (equivalent to $1162.1 million in 2025), ten-year deal with News Corp, to begin the following year. News Corp on-sold the Australian free-to-air broadcast rights to Seven Network, with the pay-TV rights being given to Foxtel. Included in the deal were the broadcasting rights for the domestic Super 12 competition, the Tri Nations Series as well as the 1999 and 2003 Rugby World Cups. In December 2004, with the then-current deal coming to an end, all three SANZAR unions renewed their broadcasting relationship with News Corp for another five years (2006–2010), valued at AU$423 million (equivalent to $666.43 million in 2022). The Seven Network also renewed their free-to-air broadcasting partnership months later. In 2010 the SANZAR–News Corp broadcasting deal was once again renewed for another five years (2011–2015), totaling AU$437 million (equivalent to $578.88 million in 2022). In March 2010 it was reported that Network 10 was believed to be no longer interested in the free-to-air rights. Subsequently, the Nine Network became the official free-to-air broadcast partner of the Wallabies for the first time. In 2013 Network 10 picked up the FTA broadcast rights again, partnering until the end of 2015.

At the end of the 2011–2015 contractual deal, all parties renewed their broadcasting agreement for another four-year deal (2016–2020). The deal was reported to be AU$285 million (equivalent to $336.94 million in 2022). Although all Wallabies home matches televised were available on Network 10, Spring Tour (November) matches for 2016, 2017 and 2018 were FTA on Special Broadcasting Service (SBS).

In November 2019 it was reported that Australian rugby's long-held broadcasting relationship with News Corp (1996–2020) would no longer continue after Foxtel walked away from negotiations. It was also reported that Optus had expressed interest in a broadcasting deal. Several months later Rugby Australia (RA) were reportedly looking for a new broadcast partner. By the end of the year, Rugby Australia had signed a broadcast deal with Nine Entertainment worth AU$100 million over three years (2021–2023). The agreement spurred Nine Entertainment's own over-the-top (OTT) streaming platform known as Stan Sport. The deal had a two-year extension option at the end of its tenure, which Nine extended in early 2023 (2024–2025). In February 2025 it was reported by the Australian Financial Review that Rugby Australia and Nine Entertainment had reached an "in-principle agreement" for a new broadcasting deal worth $210 million over five years. In the following months, the new deal between Rugby Australia and Nine Entertainment was revealed. The deal was reported to be around AU$210–240 million over five years (2026–2030), and included bonus payments if the national team (Wallabies) and the Australian Super Rugby sides hit success targets during their campaigns.

Full broadcasting timeline (excluding Rugby World Cup broadcasting rights):

- 1957–1991: Australian Broadcasting Corporation (ABC)
- 1992–1995: Network 10
- 1996–2010: News Corp (Fox Sports), Seven Network
- 2011–2012: News Corp (Fox Sports), Nine Network
- 2013–2015: News Corp (Fox Sports), Network 10
- 2016–2020: News Corp (Fox Sports, Kayo Sports), Network 10, Special Broadcasting Service (SBS; via SBS Viceland) (2016–2018 Spring Tours)
- 2021–2030: Nine Network (Stan Sport)

== Sponsorship ==
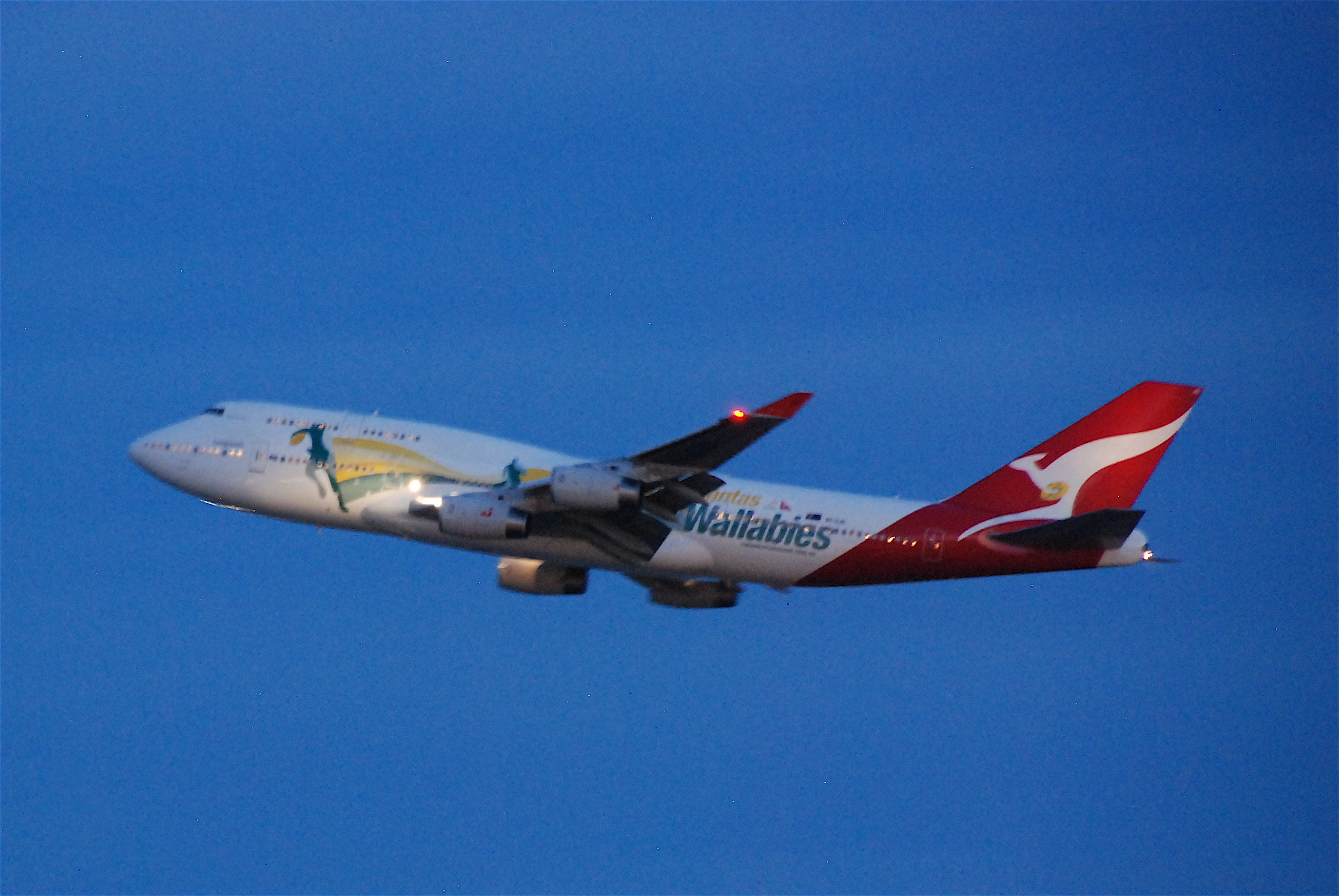
A Qantas Boeing 747-400 in 2011 with Wallabies branding

In 1978 the Australian Rugby Football Union sought sponsorship after the federal government withdrew funding for the sport. Adidas was chosen as the first sponsor, manufacturing the kit and incorporating their stripes onto the arms of the jersey and shorts. Adidas would remain the kit sponsor for 10 years. Despite needing to raise money, this first sponsorship was controversial as it was the first step of commercialising the brand surrounding Australian Rugby.

Japanese electronic company Rioch became the first company to pay for its logo to feature on the jersey itself for the 1988 Bicentenary jersey.

1989 saw Canterbury become the kit supplier for 8 years during these years XXXX beer and Schweppes also became jersey sponsors. In 1997 Reebok became the kit manufacturer for 3 years, with Vodafone signing on as the shirt sponsor from 1998.

Canterbury would return in 2000 as the kit supplier, with Qantas joining in 2004 as the shirt sponsor.

From 2010-2013 Kooga were the Wallabies kit manufacturer. This changed to Asics in 2014 for 4 years and in 2018 the deal was extended another 7 years to 2025.

In April 2015, BMW Australia became the official vehicle partner of the Australian Rugby Union for the following 2 years.

In September 2020, Qantas announced it was ending its 30 year sponsorship of the Wallabies at the end of the year due to the financial losses it incurred during the Coronavirus pandemic.

In May 2021, Rugby Australia announced that Cadbury had signed a 5 year deal to become the principal partner of the Wallabies. In July 2024, the partnership was extended to the end of 2029, ensuring Cadbury remains the principal partner during the 2025 British & Irish Lions tour of Australia, the 2027 Men's Rugby World Cup and the 2029 Women's Rugby World Cup, all being held in Australia.

In October 2021, Rugby Australian and gas company Santos jointly announced that the company had become a shirt sponsor of the Wallabies, following on from their sponsorship of the Wallaroos. This sponsorship drew criticism from former Wallabies captain, now Australian senator, David Pocock, who compared fossil fuel companies sponsoring sports to the tobacco sponsorships of the past

== See also ==
- Australia A national rugby union team
- Australia national under-20 rugby union team
- Australian Barbarians
- Australia national rugby sevens team
- Australia women's national rugby union team
- List of Australia national rugby union team records
- List of Australia national rugby union team test match results
- Wallaby Team of the Decade
- Australia national rugby league team

== Bibliography ==
- Clark, Joe (2015). Rugby World Cup: A History in 50 Greatest Games. Durrington, West Sussex: Pitch Publishing. ISBN 978-1-78531-053-9 – via Open Library.
- Team England Rugby (2003). World Cup 2003: The Official Account of England's World Cup Triumph. London: Orion Media. ISBN 0-7528-6048-8 – via Open Library.
- Fagan, Sean (2005). The Rugby Rebellion – The Divide of League and Union in Australasia. RL1908. ISBN 1-903659-25-6.
- Hickie, Thomas (1993). They Ran With the Ball – How Rugby Football Began in Australia. Longman Cheshire. ISBN 0-582-91062-5.
- Howitt, Bob (2005). SANZAR Saga – Ten Years of Super 12 and Tri-Nations Rugby. Harper Collins Publishers. ISBN 1-86950-566-2.
- Jones, Stephen (2004). On My Knees: The Pains and Passions of England's Attempt on the 2003 Rugby World Cup. Edinburgh, Scotland: Mainstream Publishing. ISBN 1-84018-708-5 – via Open Library.
- Reason, John; James, Carwyn (1979). The World of Rugby – A History of Rugby Union Football. British Broadcasting Corporation. ISBN 0-563-16280-5.
