= 1994 Italy rugby union tour of Australia =

Summary
| P | W | D | L |
Total
| 8 | 6 | 0 | 2 |
Test match
| 2 | 0 | 0 | 2 |
Opponent
| P | W | D | L |
Australia
| 2 | 0 | 0 | 2 |

The 1994 Italy rugby union tour of Australia was a series of matches played in June 1994 in Australia by Italy national rugby union team.

== Results ==
Scores and results list Italy's points tally first.

| Opposing Team | For | Against | Date | Venue | Status |
|---|---|---|---|---|---|
| Northern territory | 37 | 6 | 1 June 1994 | Darwin | Tour match |
| South Australia | 60 | 12 | 4 June 1994 | Adelaide | Tour match |
| Sydney | 36 | 26 | 8 June 1994 | Sydney | Tour match |
| Queensland XV | 21 | 19 | 12 June 1994 | Ballymore, Brisbane | Tour match |
| Queensland Country | 57 | 13 | 15 June 1994 | Toowoomba | Tour match |
| Australia | 20 | 23 | 18 June 1994 | Ballymore, Brisbane | Test match |
| New South Wales Country | 30 | 20 | 21 June 1994 | Nowra | Tour match |
| Australia | 7 | 20 | 26 June 1994 | Melbourne | Test match |
