= Bob Dwyer =

Australian rugby union coach

Bob Dwyer AM (born 29 November 1940) is an Australian rugby union coach.

== Early life ==
Educated at Sydney Boys High School, from which he graduated in 1957, Dwyer played 2nd XV rugby for the school, lining up alongside former Canterbury-Bankstown Bulldogs and Cronulla-Sutherland Sharks player George Taylforth and St. George Dragons halfback George Evans.

== Career ==
Dwyer coached Sydney club Randwick to four Sydney championship wins before becoming Australia's national team coach. He coached Australia from 1982–83, and again from 1988-95. He coached Australia to victory at the 1991 Rugby World Cup.

Dwyer moved to Leicester Tigers after the game turned professional in 1996 and replaced Tony Russ. Tigers had immediate success, in 1997 reaching the Heineken Cup final and winning the Pilkington Cup, but finished fourth in the league. Dwyer's harsh attitude to the players led to them dubbing him 'Barb Dwyer' ('barbed wire') and a public spat with one of them, Austin Healey ensued. The club's board decided to replace Dwyer with former club captain Dean Richards.

In 1998 Dwyer was appointed head coach of recently relegated Bristol. Under him the club returned to the Premiership at the first time of asking. The next season saw Bristol finish sixth in the top flight and narrowly miss out on qualification for the Heineken Cup. In 2000, Dwyer left Bristol after changes to the club's back room staff. In his time at Bristol Dwyer was a forceful advocate for the club's potential to be the leading light in English rugby, "the potential here is greater than in any other rugby city in England, including Leicester".

In 2001 Dwyer returned to Australia and became coach of the New South Wales Waratahs in Super Rugby (at the time known as Super 12). He led the Waratahs to an eighth-place finish in 2001 and their first semi-final in the competition in 2002. He resigned in 2003 after a fifth-place finish but stayed with the New South Wales union as a development officer.

In 2011, he was inducted into the IRB Hall of Fame, alongside all other Rugby World Cup-winning head coaches and captains through the 2007 edition.

== Books ==
He has written two autobiographies - The Winning Way (1992) and Full Time: A coach's Memoirs (2004). He was inducted into the Sport Australia Hall of Fame in 1991 and was made a Member of the Order of Australia in 2004 for services to rugby union. Dwyer survived a heart attack in 2013.

Preceded by Alan Jones	Australia National Rugby Union Coach; 1988-1995	Succeeded by Greg Smith
Preceded by Bob Templeton	Australia National Rugby Union Coach; 1982-1983	Succeeded by Alan Jones
