= Roger Vanderfield =

Australian doctor and rugby union referee (1928–2008)

Roger Vanderfield AO OBE
- Born: Ian Roger Vanderfield; 1928
- Died: 25 September 2008 (aged 79–80); Sydney, Australia
- Education: University of Sydney
- Occupations: Doctor, medical administrator rugby referee and administrator
- Spouse: Margaret

Ian Roger Vanderfield AO OBE (1928 – 25 September 2008) was an Australian doctor, and a rugby union referee and administrator. Vanderfield refereed over 1200 games, including 32 test matches and internationals.

== Medical career ==
A doctor by profession, Vanderfield graduated from the University of Sydney in 1952 and was a member of the Faculty of Medicine from 1973 to 1991. He was the Chief Medical Superintendent of Northern Sydney Area Health Service.

Vanderfield co-wrote the centenary history of Sydney's Royal North Shore Hospital. He was also the hospital's Honorary Archivist.

== Rugby achievements ==
In the 1980s, Vanderfield was President of the New South Wales Rugby Union and the Australian Rugby Union.

As chairman of the International Rugby Board Vanderfield was instrumental in establishing the first Rugby World Cup. The Australia and New Zealand Rugby Unions had launched a joint proposal to introduce a World Cup. There was reluctance from England, Ireland, Scotland, and Wales. Vanderfield flew to South Africa at his own expense and convinced SARU not to vote against the proposal. South Africa abstained and other unions came on board. Eventually the proposal was adopted by a vote of eight to six.

== Honours ==
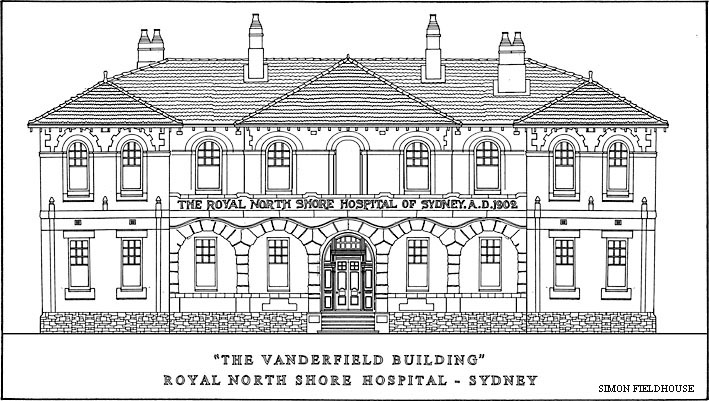
Vanderfield Building – Royal North Shore Hospital

Vanderfield was appointed an Officer of the Order of the British Empire (OBE) in the 1976 New Year Honours, "[f]or services to medicine and sport".

He was appointed an Officer of the Order of Australia (AO) in the 2006 Australia Day Honours for service to the community through the delivery of health care services at Royal North Shore Hospital, Sydney, and to Rugby Union football.

Vanderfield was elected a life member of numerous Rugby bodies. On 24 October 2011, he was posthumously inducted into the IRB Hall of Fame for his role in the creation of the Rugby World Cup.

The Vanderfield Building at Royal North Shore Hospital is named after him.

== Trophy donor ==
The B.A.R Trophy was presented by three leading Sydney rugby union referees, H.B.(Bernie) Freeman, A.T.(Arthur) Tierney and I.R.(Roger) Vanderfield, who travelled to Canberra regularly during the 1950s to conduct examinations for referees. The trophy is an engraved pewter mug presented each year to the most improved referee of the Australian Capital Territory Rugby Referees Association. The award is intended to encourage ACT referees to better themselves and to express the gratitude of the donors for the hospitality and friendship extended to them by the members.

== Obituary ==
- Stephens, Tony (2 October 2008). "High achiever on and off the field". The Sydney Morning Herald. Fairfax Media Limited. Archived from the original on 3 November 2012.
