= James Hendrie =

James Hendrie may refer to:

- Jamie Hendrie, New Zealand rugby union player
- James Hendrie (writer), English writer, producer, and director
