= 1970 New Zealand rugby union tour of South Africa =

Summary
P	W	D	L
Total
24	21	0	3
Test match
4	1	0	3
Opponent
P	W	D	L
South Africa
4	1	0	3

The 1970 New Zealand rugby union tour of South Africa was a series of matches played between June and August 1970 in South Africa and Rhodesia by the All Blacks.

It was one of the longest tours for the All Blacks. It began with two exhibition matches in Australia. An Australian player, Jamie Hendrie, was called to replace the scrum half Sid Going who did not play on Sunday.

For the All Blacks it was a comeback 10 years after the tour of 1960 when the New Zealand rugby union continued to exclude Maori and non-white players from the team in order to accommodate the South African apartheid laws.

The New Zealand Rugby Union refused any other tours for the successive 10 years until New Zealand players of all backgrounds were given the status of "Honorary Whites" allowing them to participate in the 1970 tour under apartheid laws.

== Results ==
Scores and results list All Blacks' points tally first.

=== Training match in Australia ===
Opposing Team	For	Against	Date	Venue	Status
Western Australia	50	3	14 June 1970	Perry Lakes Stadium, Perth	Tour match
A.R.U. President's XV	52	3	14 June 1970	Perry Lakes Stadium, Perth	Tour match

=== Tour ===
Opposing Team	For	Against	Date	Venue	Status
Border	28	3	20 June 1970	Border RU Ground, East London	Tour match
Paul Roos' XV	43	9	24 June 1970	Goble Stadium, Bethlehem	Tour match
Griqualand West	27	3	27 June 1970	De Beers Stadium, Kimberley	Tour match
North-West Cape	26	3	1 July 1970	Danie Kuys Stadium, Upington	Tour match
SW Africa	16	0	4 July 1970	South-West Stadium, Windhoek	Tour match
Eastern Transvaal	24	3	8 July 1970	PAM Brink, Springs	Tour match
Transvaal	34	17	11 July 1970	Ellis Park, Johannesburg	Tour match
Western Transvaal	21	17	13 July 1970	Olen Park, Potchefstroom	Tour match
Orange Free State	30	12	18 July 1970	Free State Stadium, Bloemfontein	Tour match
Rhodesia	27	14	21 July 1970	Police Ground, Salisbury	Tour match
South Africa	6	17	25 July 1970	Loftus Versfeld, Pretoria	Test Match
Eastern Province	49	8	1 August 1970	Boet Erasmus, Port Elizabeth	Tour match
Boland	35	9	4 August 1970	Boland Stadium, Wellington	Tour match
South Africa	9	8	8 August 1970	Newlands, Cape Town	Test Match
South West Districts	36	6	12 August 1970	George R.F.U. Ground, George	Tour match
Western Province	29	6	15 August 1970	Newlands, Cape Town	Tour match
South African Country	45	8	19 August 1970	Border RU Ground, East London	Tour match
Natal	29	8	22 August 1970	Kings Park, Durban	Tour match
Southern Universities	20	3	25 August 1970	Newlands, Cape Town	Tour match
South Africa	3	14	29 August 1970	Boet Erasmus, Port Elizabeth	Test Match
North-East Cape	85	0	2 September 1970	Danie Craven St., Burgersdorp	Tour match
Northern Transvaal	19	15	5 September 1970	Loftus Versfeld, Pretoria	Tour match
South Africa Gazelles (U.23)	29	25	7 September 1970	Olen Park, Potchefstroom	Tour match
South Africa	17	20	12 September 1970	Ellis Park, Johannesburg	Test Match
