= Jack Sullivan (rugby union) =

Jack Sullivan CBE
- Born: John Lorraine Sullivan; 30 March 1915 Tahora, New Zealand
- Died: 9 July 1990 (aged 75) Wellington, New Zealand
- Height: 1.79 m (5 ft 10 in)
- Weight: 80 kg (180 lb)
- Occupation: Oil company executive

Rugby union career
- Position: Wing, centre, second five-eighth
Provincial / State sides
Years	Team	Apps	(Points)
1934–40	Taranaki	44	
International career
Years	Team	Apps	(Points)
1936–38	New Zealand	6	(9)
Coaching career
- Years: Team
- Taranaki
- 1958: New Zealand under-23
- 1960: New Zealand

John Lorraine Sullivan CBE (30 March 1915 – 9 July 1990) was a New Zealand rugby union player, coach and administrator. A three-quarter and second five-eighth, Sullivan represented Taranaki at a provincial level, and was a member of the New Zealand national side, the All Blacks, from 1936 to 1938. He played nine matches for the All Blacks including six internationals.

He was selected by the editors of the 1937 Rugby Almanac of New Zealand as one of their 5 players of the year.

Following World War II, during which he saw service overseas, Sullivan became a rugby union coach, selector and administrator. He coached the Taranaki team during the late 1940s, the New Zealand under-23 side in 1958, and the All Blacks on their 1960 tour to South Africa. He was also a Taranaki selector, a North Island selector (1952–59) and a national selector (1954–60). Sullivan served on the New Zealand Rugby Union executive from 1962 to 1977, and was chairman between 1969 and 1977.

In 1977, Sullivan was awarded the Queen Elizabeth II Silver Jubilee Medal. In the 1978 New Year Honours, he was appointed a Commander of the Order of the British Empire, for services to rugby. He died in Wellington in 1990, and was buried in Te Henui Cemetery, New Plymouth.

Sporting positions
Preceded by Dick Everest	All Blacks coach 1958–1960	Succeeded by Neil McPhail
