= Marslin =

Marslin is a surname. Notable people with the surname include:

- Arthur Marslin, New Zealand rugby union coach
- Joan Hackshaw-Marslin, Trinidad and Tobago politician

== See also ==
- Marlin
