= Dick Everest =

- Born: Richard Everest; 12 May 1915 Hamilton, New Zealand
- Died: 28 February 1994 (aged 78) Hamilton, New Zealand

Rugby union career
- Position: Five-eighth
Provincial / State sides
Years	Team	Apps	(Points)
1937–44	Waikato		
Coaching career
- Years: Team
- 1947: Frankton
- 1950-56: Waikato
- 1957: New Zealand

Dick Everest (12 May 1915 – 28 February 1994) was a New Zealand rugby union player and coach. Beginning his career with Frankton Rugby Club, Everest played for Waikato between 1937 and 1944, as a five-eighth, before playing for the New Zealand Defence Force Combined Team. Everest never played for the national team as there were no All Blacks matches during World War II.

After the war, during which a shoulder injury ended his prospects as a player, Everest returned to Frankton as a coach, before beginning his legendary tenure with the Mooloos. Learning innovative tactics from matches lost and recruiting several future All Blacks, Everest enabled a climb for the Waikato side using the limited resources available to him that led to a memorable victory over the 1956 touring Springboks side in the opening match of the New Zealand leg of the tour.

In 1957, Everest was appointed All Blacks coach for the tour of Australia, where he led the team to victory in two test matches. Everest was considered for coach when the All Blacks toured South Africa in 1960, the position ultimately going to Jack Sullivan who was unable to attain victory. New Zealand would not win a series in South Africa until 1996.

Sporting positions
Preceded by Arthur Marslin	All Blacks coach 1957	Succeeded by Jack Sullivan
