= Jamie Hendrie =

New Zealand rugby union player

James Malcolm Hendrie
- Born: 12 June 1951 Singapore
- Height: 168 cm (5 ft 6 in)
- Weight: 65 kg (143 lb)
- School: Clifton Hall (Scotland); Merchiston Castle (Scotland)

Rugby union career
- Position: Halfback
International career
Years	Team	Apps	(Points)
1970	New Zealand	0	(0)

James Malcolm Hendrie (born 12 June 1951) is a former rugby union player who played once for New Zealand. A halfback, he was a guest player for the All Blacks against a President's XV in Perth, Western Australia when the team was en route to South Africa in 1970. Two games against Western Australian teams were played on Sunday, and Sid Going (a Mormon) was unavailable for religious reasons. Despite the game being an exhibition match, Hendrie is officially an All Black, and was the 680th player to represent New Zealand.

Born in Singapore, he was educated at Clifton Hall School and Merchiston Castle School; both in Edinburgh, Scotland. He had played for the University of Western Australia for four years.

Hendrie is a doctor and a fellow of the Australasian College of Emergency Medicine.
