= Neil McPhail =

New Zealand rugby union coach

- Born: Neil James McPhail; 1912 New Zealand
- Died: 7 November 1994 (aged 81–82) Christchurch
- Notable relative(s): David McPhail (half-brother); Edward Hasell (uncle)

Rugby union career
Coaching career
- Years: Team
- 1961–1965: New Zealand

Neil James McPhail (1912 – 7 November 1994) was a New Zealand rugby union team coach from 1961 to 1965.

== Family ==
McPhail was born in 1912. His father was Alex (Alexander Edward) McPhail (1880–1957), who was an administrator for the New Zealand Rugby Football Union. His mother was Alice Mabel McPhail (née Hasell; died 1936). David McPhail is a much younger half-brother from his father's second marriage. McPhail attended St Albans primary school and Christchurch Boys' High School. He was from a rugby family; apart from his father, his elder brother Clem represented Canterbury, and their uncle Edward Hasell was an All Black. Their younger brother John showed the most promise, but an accident ended his rugby career. Their uncle Dave McPhail (Alex's brother) was also a Canterbury representative player.

In August 1940, it was announced that McPhail had become engaged to Janet Gladys Cooke, the daughter of Dr E. J. Cooke of Christchurch (a surgeon at Christchurch hospital). McPhail left for war service sometime after the engagement and his fiancée married Patrick Alexander Harding Moore in December 1943 instead. McPhail married June Margot Cummins at the Wellington Cathedral of St Paul on 2 November 1946.

== Career ==
McPhail played 31 or 32 representative games for Canterbury between 1935 and 1939. In 1940, he joined the New Zealand Army and became a member of the New Zealand Army team. He saw service in Egypt, Greece, and Crete. During the Operation Crusader at Belhamed, he became a prisoner of war on 1 December 1941. Rather than returning home after the war, McPhail and Patrick Rhind hung around as they had heard that an army rugby team would be formed. Some 70 players were trialled and both of them were chosen for the Kiwis, and they toured England, Scotland, and Wales. In 1946, the Kiwis then toured New Zealand. For the 1947–48 season, McPhail returned to Christchurch. Apart from rugby, McPhail excelled in shot put. He was a fast sprinter and his best time was 10.4 seconds for 100 yd (91 m).

McPhail coached the New Zealand rugby union team from 1961 to 1965 for a total of 20 tests. He could be gruff and abrupt, and those character traits earned him the nickname "Grumpy".

When sportswriter Phil Gifford ranked All Black coaches for The New Zealand Herald, he put McPhail in fifth position.

Outside of sport, McPhail was a leather merchant, like his father before him.

== Later life ==
The McPhails had five children – two girls and three boys. McPhail's wife died in June 1986. He died on 7 November 1994 in Christchurch.

Sporting positions
Preceded by Jack Sullivan	All Blacks coach 1961–1965	Succeeded by Ronald Bush
