= Arthur Marslin =

New Zealand rugby union coach

- Born: Arthur Marslin New Zealand

Rugby union career
Coaching career
- Years: Team
- 1953–1954: New Zealand

Arthur Marslin was a New Zealand rugby union team coach from 1953 to 1954.

== Career ==
Marslin played for the Otago Boys' High School rugby team from 1917 to 1919.

Marslin coached the New Zealand rugby union team from 1953 to 1954 for a total of 5 tests.

Sporting positions
Preceded by Len Clode	All Blacks coach 1953–1954	Succeeded by Dick Everest
