= New Zealand national rugby union team =

Men's rugby union team of New Zealand

New Zealand
- Nickname: All Blacks
- Emblem: Silver fern
- Union: New Zealand Rugby
- Head coach: Dave Rennie
- Captain: Ardie Savea
- Most caps: Sam Whitelock (153)
- Top scorer: Dan Carter (1,598)
- Top try scorer: Will Jordan (56)
First colours	Second colours

World Rugby ranking
- Current: 5 (as of 23 November 2026)
- Highest: 1 (2003, 2004–2008, 2009–2019, 2021, 2025, 2026)
- Lowest: 5 (2022, 2026)

First international
- Australia 3–22 New Zealand (Sydney, Australia; 15 August 1903)

Biggest win
- New Zealand 145–17 Japan (Bloemfontein, South Africa; 4 June 1995)

Biggest defeat
- New Zealand 10–43 South Africa (Wellington, New Zealand; 13 September 2025)

World Cup
- Appearances: 10 (first in 1987)
- Best result: Champions (1987, 2011, 2015)

Tri Nations/Rugby Championship
- Appearances: 30
- Best result: Champions (1996, 1997, 1999, 2002, 2003, 2005, 2006, 2007, 2008, 2010, 2012, 2013, 2014, 2016, 2017, 2018, 2020, 2021, 2022, 2023)
- Website: allblacks.com

The New Zealand national rugby union team, known as the All Blacks (Māori: Ōpango [ɔːpaŋɔ]), represents New Zealand in men's rugby union, which is considered the country's national sport. Famed for their international success, the All Blacks have often been regarded as one of the most successful sports teams in history.

The team won the Rugby World Cup in 1987, 2011, and 2015. They were the first country to retain the Rugby World Cup. Since their international debut in 1903, the All Blacks have played test matches against 19 nations, of which 12 have never won a game against the team. New Zealand has a 76% winning record in test match rugby, and has recorded more wins than losses against every international opponent. Since the introduction of the World Rugby Rankings in 2003, New Zealand has held the number-one ranking longer than all other teams combined. They jointly hold the men's record for the most consecutive test match wins for a tier-one ranked nation, along with England.

The All Blacks compete with Argentina, Australia and South Africa in the Rugby Championship, and have won the trophy twenty times in the competition's thirty–year history. The team has completed a Grand Slam tour against the four Home Nations four times (1978, 2005, 2008 and 2010). World Rugby has named New Zealand the World Rugby Team of the Year ten times since the award was initiated in 2001, and an All Black has won the World Rugby Player of the Year award ten times over the same period. Nineteen former All Blacks have been inducted into the World Rugby Hall Of Fame.

The team's first match took place in 1884 in New South Wales and their first international test match in 1903 against Australia in Sydney. The following year New Zealand hosted their first home test, a match against a British Isles side in Wellington. (Note: The British Isles side subsequently became known as the British & Irish Lions.) There followed a 34–game tour of Europe and North America in 1905 (which included five test matches), where New Zealand suffered only one defeat: their first test loss, against Wales.

New Zealand's early uniforms consisted of a black jersey with a silver fern and white shorts. By the 1905 tour they were wearing all black, except for the silver fern, and the name "All Blacks" dates from this time.

The team perform a haka before every match. Traditionally the All Blacks use Te Rauparaha's haka Ka Mate, although players have also performed Kapa o Pango since 2005.

== History ==
=== Introduction of rugby to New Zealand ===
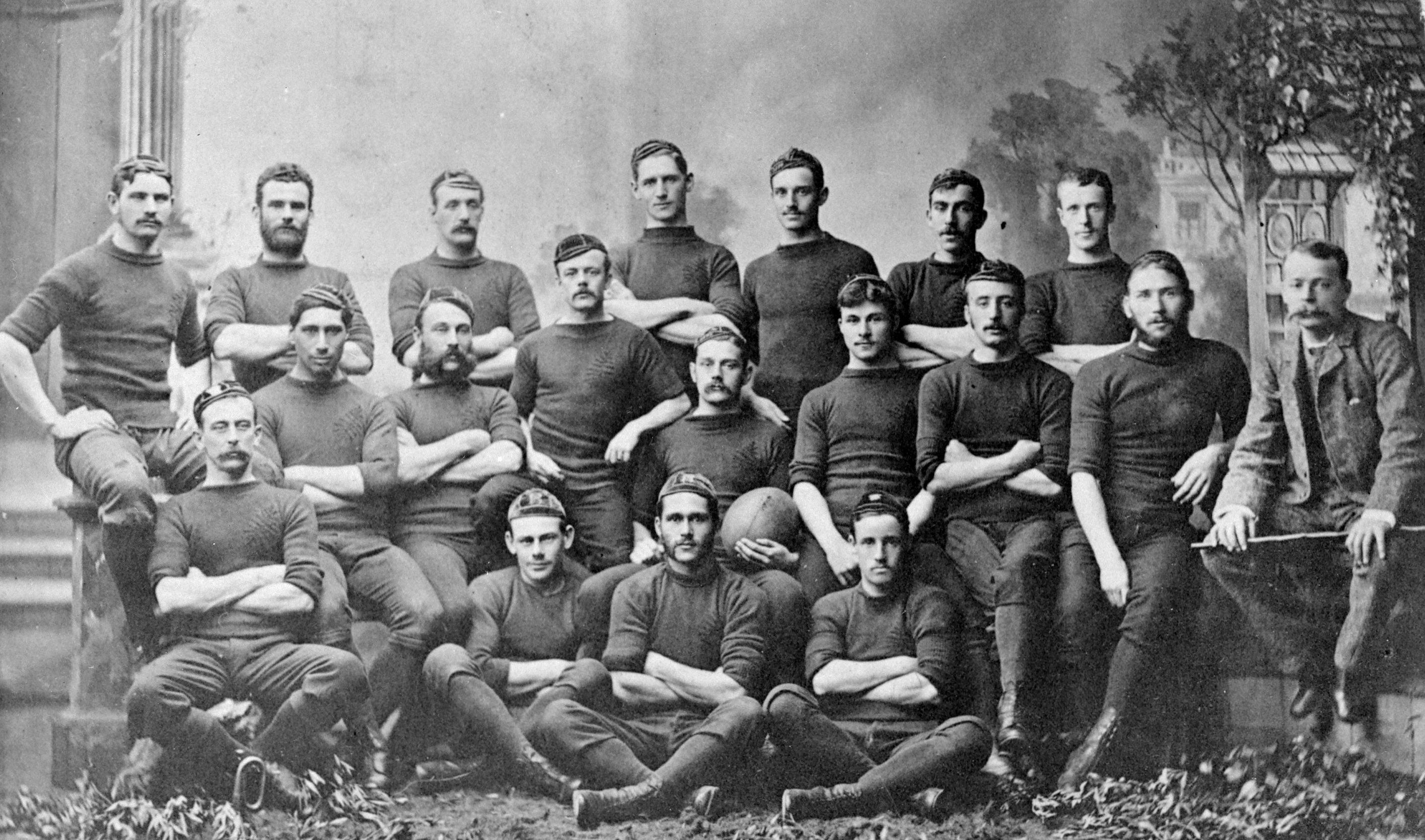
The New Zealand team that toured New South Wales in 1884

Rugby union, known almost universally in New Zealand as just "rugby", was introduced to the nation by Charles Monro in 1870; he had discovered the sport while completing his studies at Christ's College in Finchley, England. The first recorded game in New Zealand took place in May 1870 in the city of Nelson, between the Nelson rugby club and Nelson College. The first provincial union, the Canterbury Rugby Football Union, was formed in 1879, and New Zealand's first internationals were played in 1882 when the "Waratahs" from New South Wales toured the country. The Australian team did not face a New Zealand national team but played seven provincial sides; the tourists won four games and lost three. Two years later, the first New Zealand team to travel overseas toured New South Wales, winning all eight of their games.

A privately organised British team, which later became the British & Irish Lions, toured New Zealand in 1888. The visitors only played provincial sides and no test matches were played. Wales and Scotland were represented in the British team, but the players were drawn mainly from Northern England.

=== International competition begins ===
In 1892, following the canvassing of provincial administrators by Ernest Hoben, the New Zealand Rugby Football Union (NZRFU) was formed by the majority of New Zealand's provincial unions, but did not include Canterbury, Otago or Southland. (Note: Canterbury, Otago and Southland objected to the requirement that NZRFU executive committee members needed to live in Wellington. They eventually all joined the NZRFU, but the residency rule did not change until 1986.) The first officially sanctioned New Zealand side toured New South Wales in 1893, where the Thomas Ellison captained team won nine of their ten matches. The following year New Zealand played its first home "international" game, losing 6–8 to New South Wales. (Note: Six of the New South Welshmen were New Zealanders living in Sydney.) The team's first true test match occurred against Australia on 15 August 1903 at the Sydney Cricket Ground in front of over 30,000 spectators and resulted in a 22–3 victory.

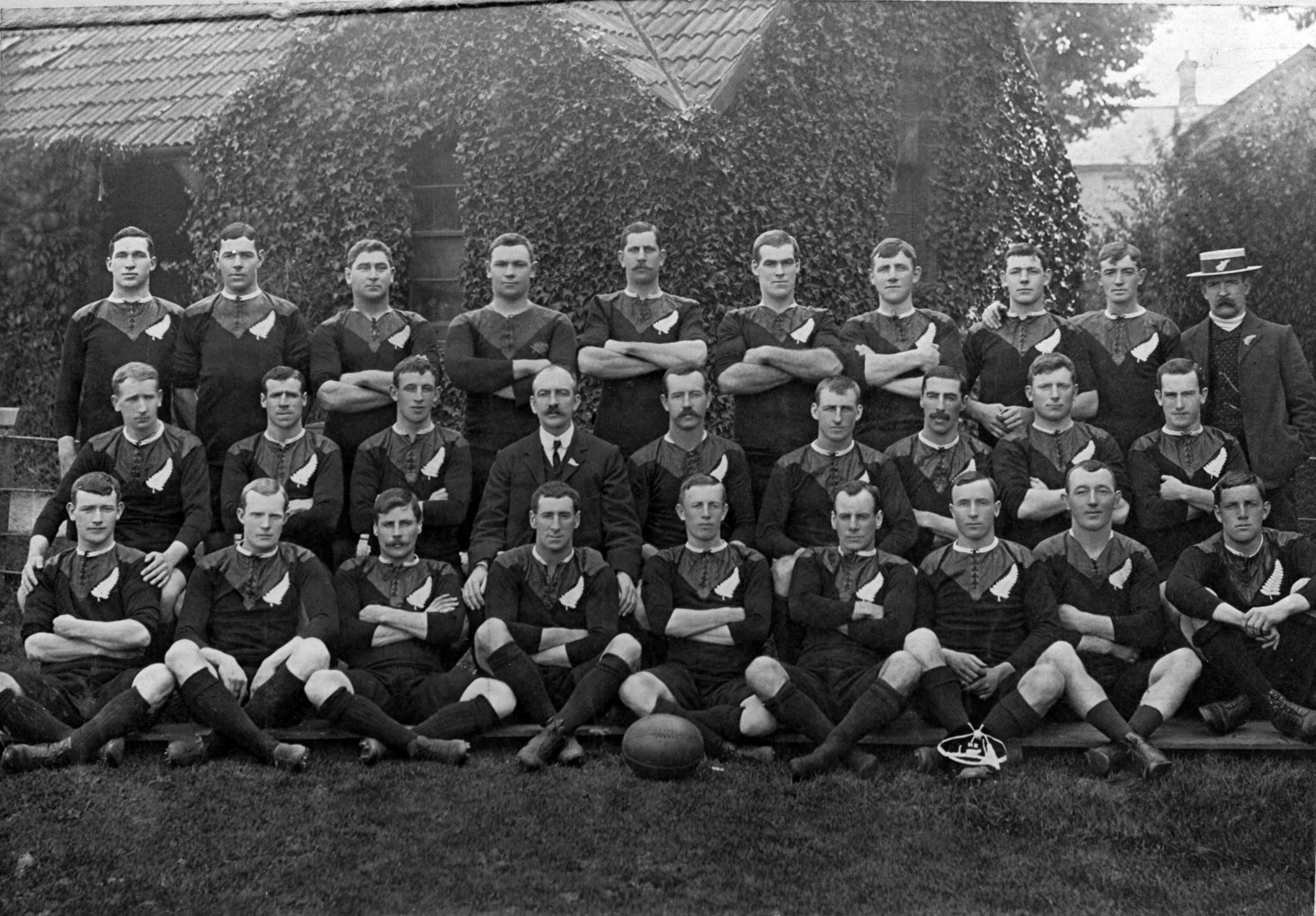
The Original All Blacks that toured the British Isles, France and the United States during 1905–06. The team won 34 of their 35 tour matches.

A representative New Zealand team first toured the British Isles in 1905. The side is now known as the "Originals", as the "All Blacks" name emerged during this tour when, according to team member Billy Wallace, a London newspaper reported that the New Zealanders played as if they were "all backs". Wallace claimed that because of a typographical error, subsequent references were to "All Blacks". This account is most likely a myth: because of their black playing strip, the side was probably referred to as the Blacks before they left New Zealand. Even though the name All Blacks most likely existed before the trip, the tour did popularise it.

The Originals played 35 matches on tour, winning all but their 0–3 defeat to Wales in Cardiff. That game became known as The match of the Century, and has entered into the folklore of both countries. (Note: Tries were worth three points at the time.) In contrast to the success of the Originals on the field, the team did antagonise some in the Home Nations' rugby establishment; both administrators and the press complained that the All Blacks did not play the game within the amateur and gentlemanly spirit promoted by the International Rugby Football Board. This complaint continued to dog New Zealand teams until the 1930s.

The success of the Originals had uncomfortable consequences for the amateur NZRFU. In 1907, a party of professional players was assembled to tour the British Isles and play rugby league – a professional offshoot of rugby union that was played by clubs that split from England's Rugby Football Union (RFU) due to disagreements over financial compensation for players. When the "All Golds", as the team came to be known, returned they established rugby league in New Zealand, and a large number of players switched to the professional code. English and Welsh authorities were alarmed by the threat of professionalism to rugby in New Zealand, and in 1908 an Anglo-Welsh side undertook a tour to New Zealand to help promote the amateur values (Note: Amateurism was not just about not playing for money. Many in the traditional rugby establishment believed that: "Excessive striving for victory introduced an unhealthy spirit of competition, transforming a character-building 'mock fight' into 'serious fighting'. Training and specialization degraded sport to the level of work".) under which they believed sport should be played. (Note: The Anglo-Welsh are officially acknowledged as a British & Irish Lions side despite Ireland and Scotland refusing to contribute any players.) The tourists were defeated 2–0 in the three-test series by New Zealand, but the Anglo-Welsh did manage to draw the second test 3–3.

=== Development of a legacy ===
International rugby was suspended during the First World War, but a New Zealand Services team did compete in inter-services competition known as the King's Cup. After their departure from Europe the side toured South Africa before their return to New Zealand, and that tour paved the way for a South African team to tour New Zealand in 1921. The Springboks – as the South African team is known – played New Zealand in a test series that ended all square. New Zealand conducted a return tour to South Africa in 1928, and the test series was again drawn; both teams winning two tests each.

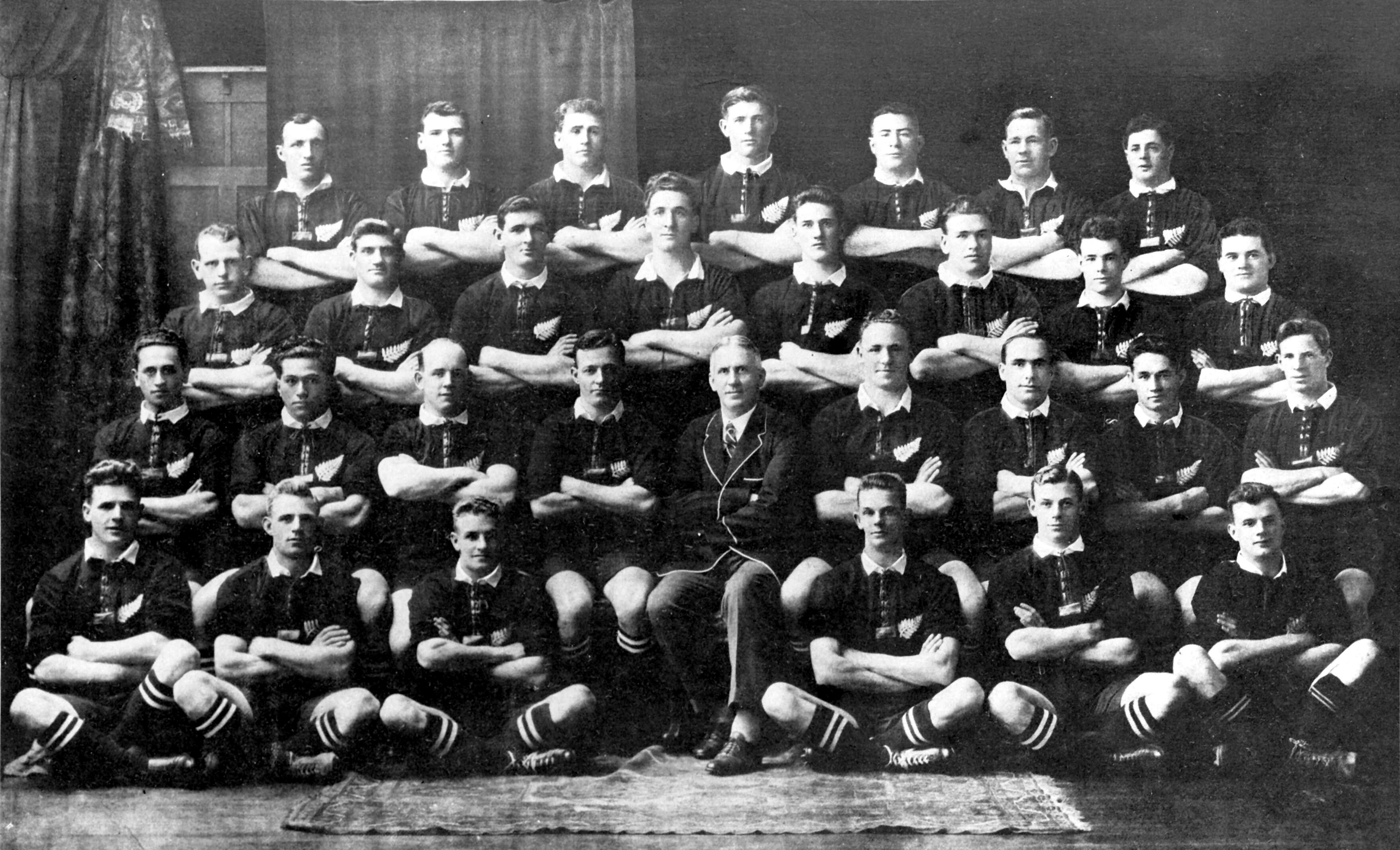
"The Invincibles" All Blacks that toured to the British Isles and France in 1924–25

The 1924 All Black tourists to the British Isles and France were dubbed "the Invincibles" because they won every game. However, the team was deprived of a potential grand slam when Scotland refused to play them because they were upset the tour was organised through the RFU rather than the IRFB. The first British Isles side since 1908 toured New Zealand in 1930. Although the Lions won the first test, the home side regrouped and went on to win the series 3–1. New Zealand toured the British Isles again in 1935–36, losing only three games – including two tests – during a 30-match tour. In one of these losses, Alexander Obolensky famously scored two tries to help England to a 13–0 win; their first over New Zealand.

In 1937, South Africa toured New Zealand and decisively won the test series despite losing the first test; this 1937 South African team was described as the best team ever to leave New Zealand. It was not until 1949 that New Zealand next played the Springboks when they toured South Africa with Fred Allen as captain. Although each test against South Africa was very close, New Zealand lost the series 0–4. As part of this 25-match, 4-test series, an All Blacks 'second string' side travelled up to Southern Rhodesia (now Zimbabwe) to face the Rhodesia representative side in two non-Test Internationals. The result of the first match saw Rhodesia run out winners, 10–8. Three days later, the second match resulted in a 3–3 draw. Two of the Rhodesian players were later capped for South Africa (being eligible due to Rhodesia's treatment as a province of South Africa, for rugby reasons) in the All Blacks second test of the tour. No International caps were awarded to either side for these two matches.

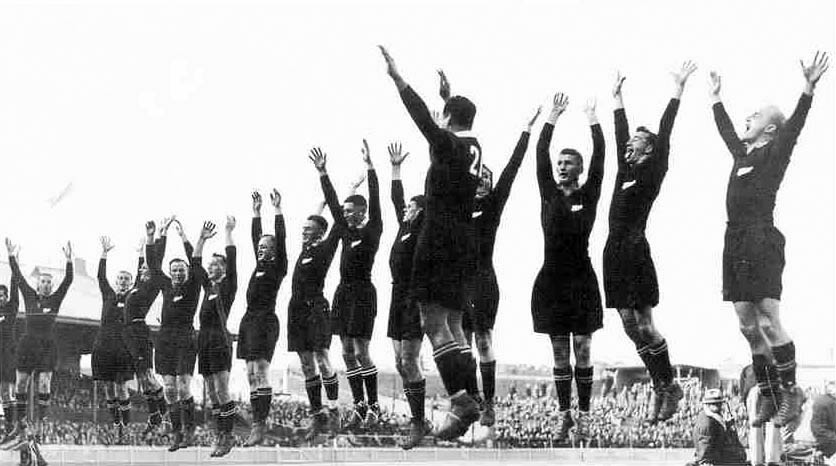
The All Blacks at the climax of their haka before a 1932 test against Australia

At the same time as an All Black team was touring South Africa, Australia were touring New Zealand. The two tours coincided because Māori players were not able to go to South Africa at the time due to apartheid (the All Black team in South Africa refused to do the haka in protest), meaning the Australians played against a New Zealand team made up of the best Māori and the reserve non-Māori players, while the South Africans encountered the best pākehā (white) players. (Note: This restriction on non-White players representing New Zealand in South Africa lasted until the 1970 tour, when four players of Māori or Samoan ancestry were allowed into the country as "honorary whites".) On the afternoon of 3 September New Zealand, captained by Johnny Smith, were beaten 6–11 by Australia in Wellington. New Zealand then lost their second test 9–16, giving Australia a Bledisloe Cup series win in New Zealand for the first time. 1949 was an annus horribilis for the All Blacks as they lost all six of their test matches, and the experience of playing two test series simultaneously has not been repeated.

The two consecutive series losses to South Africa made their 1956 tour of New Zealand highly anticipated. New Zealand were captained by Bob Duff and coached by Bob Stuart, and their 3–1 series win was their first over the Springboks and the Springboks' first series loss that century. During the series, New Zealand introduced Don Clarke, and brought prop Kevin Skinner out of retirement to help secure the win. Skinner, a former New Zealand boxing champion, had retired from international rugby, but was convinced to return for the third and fourth tests. One reason for Skinner's selection was to "sort out" the South African props, while Clarke become known as "The Boot" for his goal kicking.

New Zealand's 3–1 series win over the Lions in 1959 proved to be the start of a dominant period in All Black rugby. This was followed by the 1963–64 tour to Britain and Ireland, led by Wilson Whineray, in which New Zealand were deprived of a Grand Slam by a scoreless draw with Scotland. The only loss on this tour was to Newport RFC, who won 3–0 at Rodney Parade, Newport on 30 October 1963. The 1967 side won three tests against the home nations, but was unable to play Ireland because of a foot-and-mouth scare. This tour formed part of New Zealand's longest winning streak, between 1965 and 1970, of 17 test victories. This was also the longest test winning streak by any nation at the time; it was equalled by the Springboks in 1998, and surpassed by Lithuania in 2010. (Note: Unlike South Africa and New Zealand, Lithuania did not have to play any Tier 1 or Tier 2 national teams.)

NZ then lost the 1970 away series in South Africa. Although the 1966 Lions had been defeated 0–4 in their New Zealand tour, there was a reversal of fortune five years later when the 1971 Lions, under the captaincy of Welshman John Dawes, beat New Zealand in a test series, which remains the Lions' only series victory in New Zealand.

The 1972–3 tourists narrowly missed a Grand Slam with a draw against Ireland. The tour was notable for the sending home of prop Keith Murdoch, who was alleged to have been involved in a brawl in a Cardiff hotel while celebrating the defeat of Wales.

In 1978, Graham Mourie captained New Zealand to their first Grand Slam, including a 13–12 victory over Wales. That game generated controversy after New Zealand won as the result of a late penalty. Lock Andy Haden had dived out of a line-out in an attempt to earn a penalty, but referee Roger Quittenden insisted the penalty was against Welsh lock Geoff Wheel for jumping off the shoulder of Frank Oliver. New Zealand's only loss on the tour was the famous 12–0 defeat by Irish province Munster at Thomond Park. A play that focused on the loss was later written by John Breen, called Alone it Stands.

=== Controversial tours ===
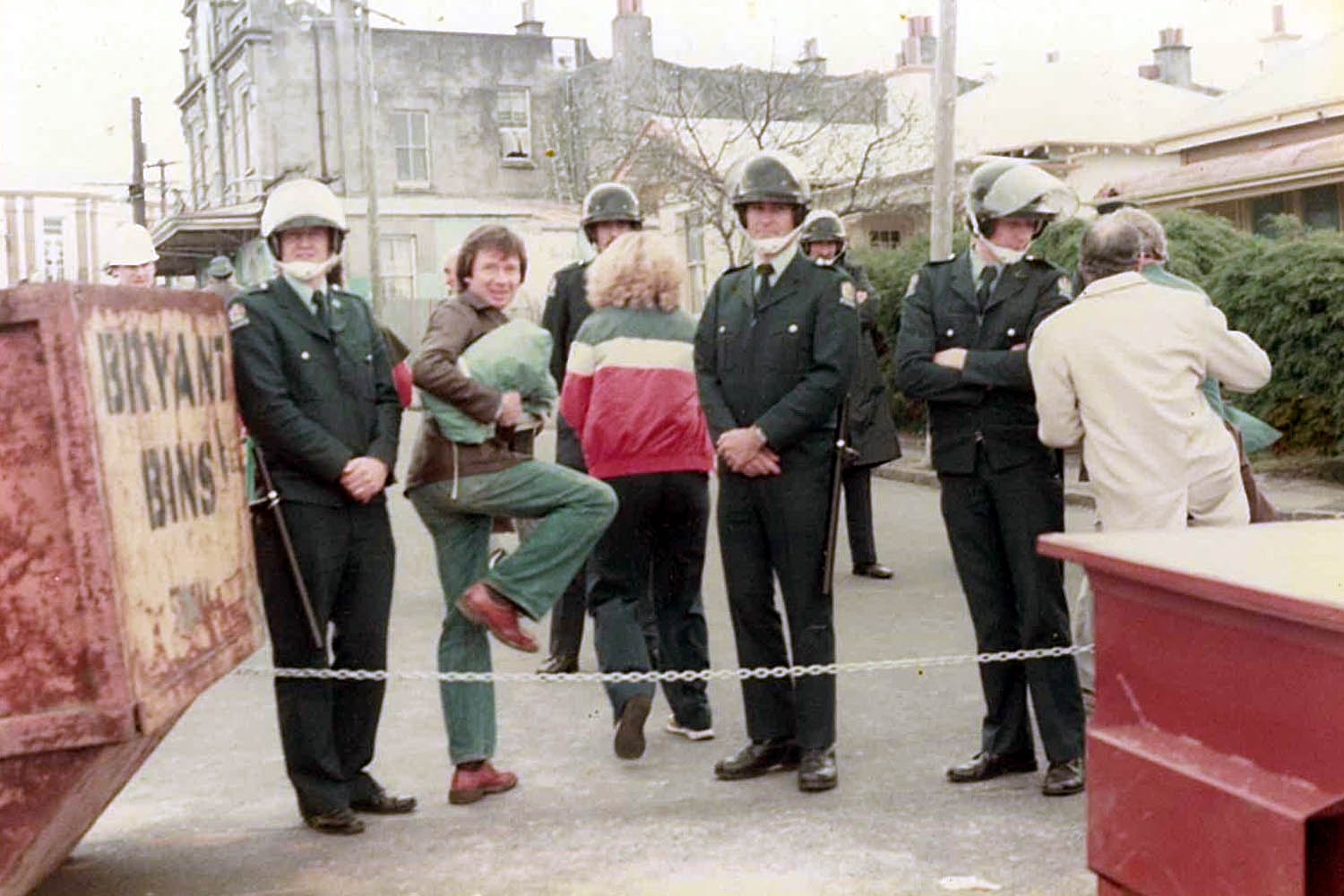
Police outside Eden Park prior to a New Zealand match during the 1981 Springbok tour

For the 1960 All Blacks tour of South Africa, the South African authorities insisted that Maori players be excluded from the team. The subsequent controversy led to the New Zealand Rugby Union refusing any other tour of the country for the following 10 years until the 1970 tour, when Maori players were accepted as "honorary whites".

The 1976 All Blacks tour of apartheid South Africa generated much controversy and led to the boycott of the 1976 Summer Olympics in Montreal by 33 African nations after the IOC refused to ban the team. New Zealand again failed to win the test series in South Africa, and did not secure another series victory until 1996, after the fall of apartheid and the introduction of neutral referees. The 1976 tour contributed to the Gleneagles Agreement being adopted by the Commonwealth Heads of State in 1977.

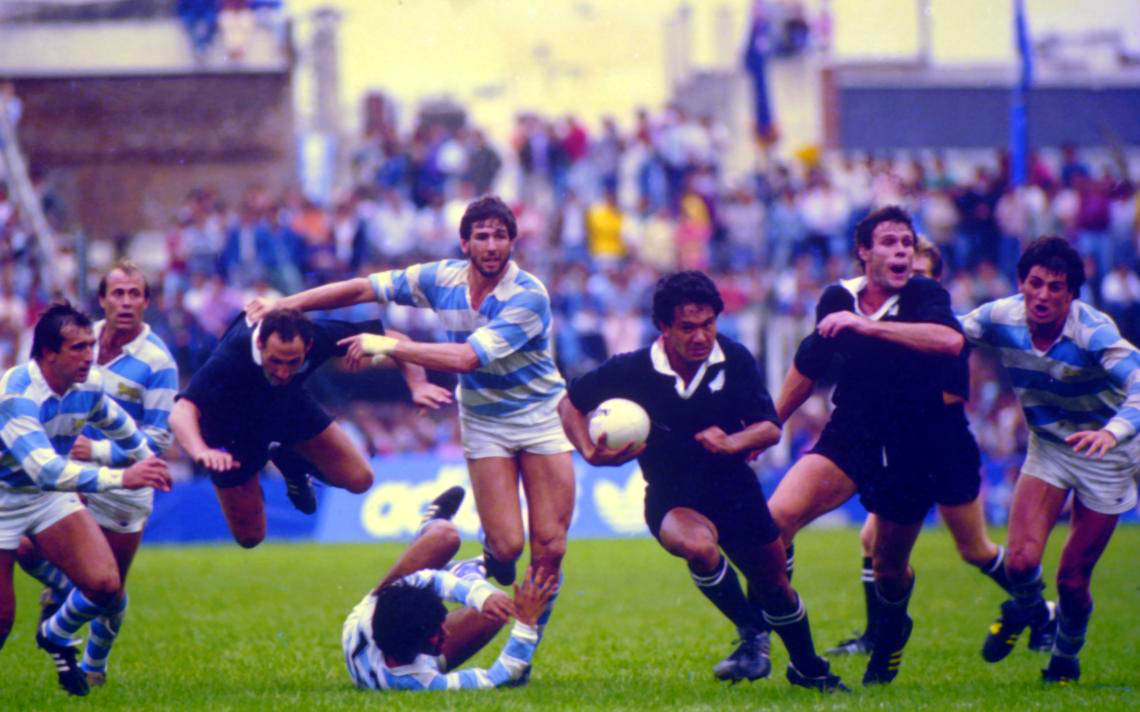
The All Blacks playing the Pumas during their 1985 tour of Argentina

The 1981 South African tour to New Zealand sparked a protest movement against South Africa's apartheid policy; this type of protest had not been seen in New Zealand since the 1951 waterfront dispute. The NZRU had invited the Springboks to tour because the Muldoon government refused to involve politics in sport. Although New Zealand won the test series, two of the tour's provincial games were cancelled and the whole tour was marred by violence and protest. The third and final test match of the tour is sometimes known as the Flour Bomb test, as an anti-apartheid activist in a Cessna light aircraft dropped leaflets, flares, a parachute-supported banner reading "Biko", and flour bombs, into Auckland's Eden Park throughout the match, felling a New Zealand player. The country experienced unrest during the tour, which had a significant impact on New Zealand society.

The 1985 All Blacks tour to South Africa was cancelled after legal action on the grounds that it would breach the NZRU's constitution. In 1986, a rebel tour to South Africa took place that had not been authorised by the NZRU and the team, named the Cavaliers, included many All Blacks. Those that participated in the tour received a ban for two tests from the NZRU when they returned to New Zealand. Allegations that players received payment for the tour were never proved.

=== Early World Cups ===
New Zealand hosted and won the inaugural World Cup in 1987 beating France 29–9 in the final. New Zealand conceded only 52 points and scored 43 tries in six games en route to the title, beating Italy, Fiji, Argentina, Scotland, Wales and France.

The All Blacks suffered a dual blow in early-mid 1990. Undisputed test fullback John Gallagher switched codes and signed to play with English rugby league club Leeds. This came after his 1989 tour understudy Matthew Ridge had signed to play rugby league with Sydney-based club Manly-Warringah less than a week earlier. Around this time union also lost other goal-kicking All Blacks to rugby league including John Schuster (Newcastle Knights in Australia), Frano Botica (English club Wigan) and Kurt Sherlock (Sydney club Eastern Suburbs). New Zealand rugby also lost Waikato goal kicking fullback Daryl Halligan who signed to play league for the North Sydney Bears. As it turned out, they were also very close to losing Zinzan Brooke who was set to join Ridge at Manly when (according to Ridge) a personal dispute between the two saw Brooke back out on a signed contract with Manly (allegedly worth AU$100,000 per season) to stay in rugby union.

By the 1991 World Cup New Zealand were an ageing side, co-coached by Alex Wyllie and John Hart. After beating hosts England in the tournament opener, they struggled during pool matches against the United States and Italy, and won their quarter-final against Canada. They were then knocked out by eventual winners Australia 16–6 in their semi-final at Lansdowne Road. In the wake of the tournament, there were many retirements, including coach Wyllie, who had enjoyed an 86% win rate during 29 tests in charge.

Laurie Mains replaced Wyllie in 1992, and was given the job of preparing the side for the 1995 event in South Africa. New Zealand were again one of the favourites to take the championship. Their status as favourites was enhanced when a young Jonah Lomu scored four tries against England in the 45–29 semi-final win. They managed to take hosts South Africa to extra time in the final, before losing 12–15 to Joel Stransky's drop goal.

=== Professionalism ===
The professional era in rugby union began in 1995, spurred by creation of the SANZAR group (a combination of South Africa, New Zealand and Australia) which was formed with the purpose of selling broadcast rights for two new competitions, the domestic Super 12 competition and the Tri-Nations. The first Tri-Nations was contested in 1996, with New Zealand winning all four of their tests to take the trophy. After a 1996 Tri-Nations match hosted by South Africa, won 29–18 by New Zealand, preceded a separate three-match test series between the two sides. Under new coach John Hart and the captaincy of Sean Fitzpatrick, New Zealand won a test series in South Africa for the first time. Fitzpatrick rated the series win higher than the 1987 World Cup victory in which he had participated.

The next three seasons saw mixed results for New Zealand, who won all their Tri-Nations tests in 1997 before losing the title for the first time in 1998. In 1998 New Zealand lost all five tests in the Tri-Nations and Bledisloe Cup series (two to South Africa and three to Australia), the first time they had lost four tests in succession since 1949. The following year they suffered their worst test loss, 7–28 to Australia in Sydney. At the 1999 World Cup later that year, the All Blacks dominated their pool, handing England a 16–30 defeat at Twickenham. They advanced past Scotland 30–18 in the quarter-finals to play France at Twickenham. After New Zealand finished the first half 17–10 ahead, France then produced a famous half of rugby to which New Zealand had no answer, winning 43–31. Hart subsequently resigned as coach and was replaced by co-coaches Wayne Smith and Tony Gilbert.

Under Smith and Gilbert, New Zealand came second in the 2000 and 2001 Tri-Nations, and in neither season did the side reclaim the Bledisloe Cup – which had been lost in 1998. Both coaches were replaced by John Mitchell on 3 October 2001, and he went on to coach New Zealand to victory in both the 2002 and 2003 Tri-Nations, as well as regaining the Bledisloe Cup in 2003. Mitchell's abrasive personal manner and management style, together with his coaching techniques, were the subject of some controversy both at the time and subsequently. Despite losing to England earlier in the year, the All Blacks entered the 2003 World Cup as one of the favourites and dominated their pool, running up wins against Italy, Canada and Tonga, before winning one of the most competitive matches of the tournament against Wales. They defeated South Africa in their quarter-final, a team they had never beaten at the World Cup, 29–9, but lost to Australia 10–22 in the semi-final in Sydney. Following the team's lacklustre showing in the tournament, the NZRU terminated Mitchell's contract and installed Graham Henry as national coach.

=== Henry era ===
Graham Henry's tenure as coach began with a double victory over 2003 Rugby World Cup winners England in 2004. The two games had an aggregate score of 72–15, and England were kept try-less. Despite the winning start to Henry's tenure, the Tri-Nations was a mixed success with two wins and two losses. The competition was the closest ever, bonus points decided the outcome, and New Zealand finishing last. (Note: Bonus points could be earned via two means; by scoring four tries or more in one match, or through losing a match by seven points or less.) The 2004 season finished with three wins in Europe, including a record 45–6 victory over France under new captain and outside centre Tana Umaga.

2005 saw New Zealand host the touring British & Irish Lions, steered by World Cup-winning English coach Clive Woodward, and featuring a number of Northern Hemisphere stars including Jonny Wilkinson. New Zealand won all three games easily, with a young Dan Carter turning in a masterclass in the second test. The series was marred by an incident in the first test after the Lions captain, Irish centre Brian O'Driscoll, was upended in an aggressive clearout by Tana Umaga and Keven Mealamu. O'Driscoll suffered a dislocated shoulder and missed the rest of the tour as a result. Match footage was inconclusive at the time, and both Umaga and Mealamu escaped serious sanction. O'Driscoll and the Lions management maintained it was a deliberate spear tackle, and the controversy both tainted the All Blacks' series victory and continued for some years afterward.

That same year, they also won the Tri-Nations, and achieved a second Grand Slam over the Home Nations for the first time since 1978. They went on to sweep the major IRB (now World Rugby) awards in which they were named: Team of the Year, Henry was named Coach of the Year, and first five-eighth Dan Carter was Player of the Year. New Zealand were nominated for the Laureus World Sports Award for Team of the Year in 2006 for their 2005 performance. The following year they again took the Tri-Nations Series after winning their first five matches, three against Australia and two against South Africa. They lost their final match of the series against South Africa. They completed their end of year tour unbeaten, with record away wins over France, England and Wales. New Zealand were named 2006 IRB Team of the Year and were nominated for the Laureus World Sports Award for the second time, while flanker and newly appointed captain Richie McCaw was named IRB Player of the Year for the first time.

The 2007 season started off with two mid-year tests against France. New Zealand won the tests 42–11 at Eden Park and 61–10 at Westpac Stadium. A third game, against Canada, resulted in a 64–13 win, although the game was more competitive than the scoreline indicated. New Zealand's first Tri-Nations game of 2007 was against the Springboks in Durban, South Africa. New Zealand scored two tries in the final fifteen minutes of the game to win 26–21. The following week against the Wallabies at the Melbourne Cricket Ground the Wallabies upset New Zealand to win 20–15. The All Blacks won their following home games to successfully defend the Tri-Nations Series for 2007. New Zealand entered the 2007 Rugby World Cup as favourites, and topped their pool, beating Scotland, Italy, Romania and Portugal by at least 40 points. However, they then suffered a defeat by hosts France in the quarter-finals in Cardiff. Following the loss to France coach Graham Henry's job was reappointed amid vocal debate and comment, despite Robbie Deans being a strong contender.

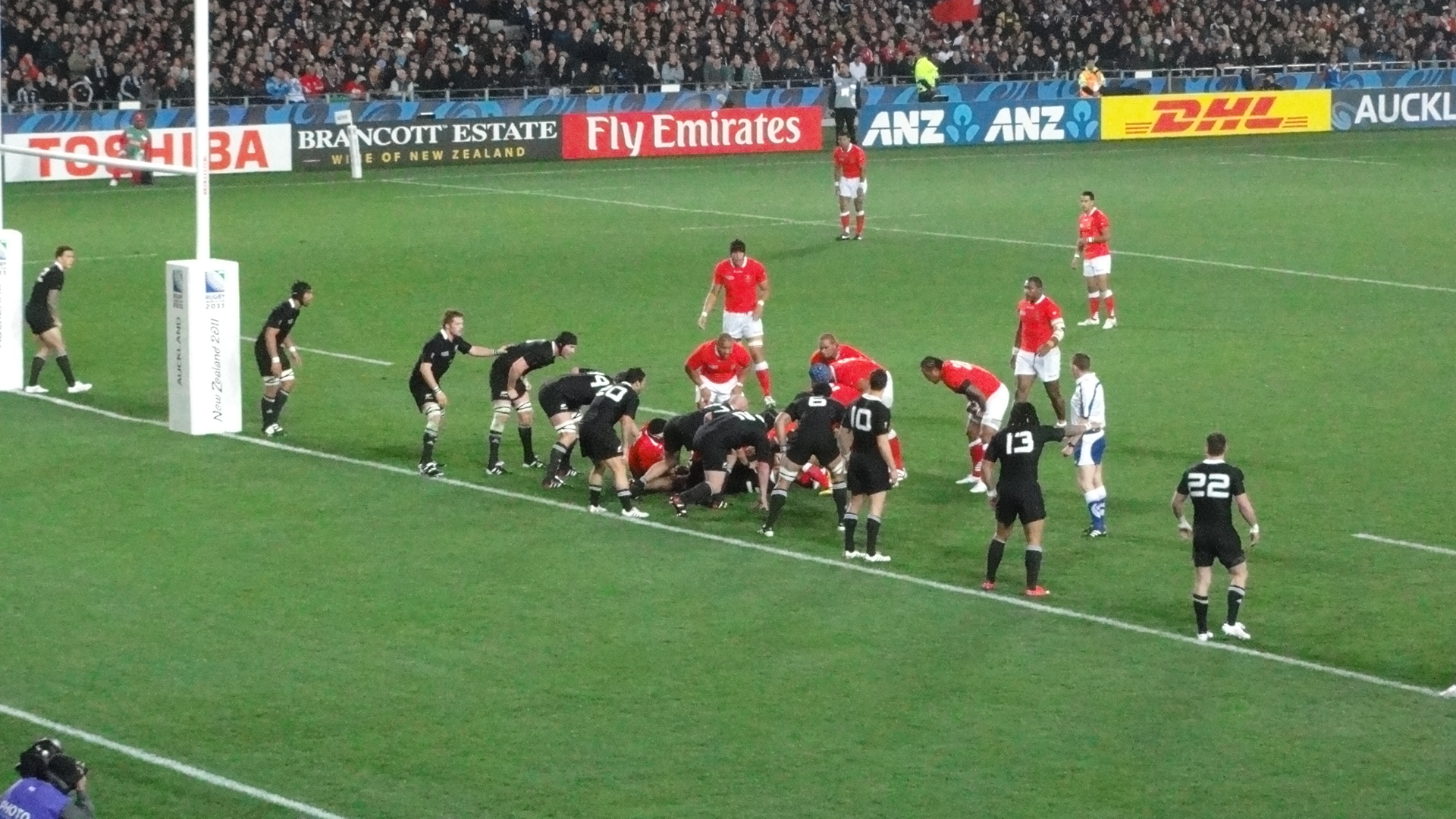
New Zealand playing Tonga in the 2011 Rugby World Cup

The 2008 season started with three mid-year tests against Ireland and England, all of which New Zealand won. New Zealand played their first Tri-Nations game against South Africa in Wellington, winning 19–8, but a week later at Carisbrook in Dunedin they lost to South Africa 28–30, ending a 30-match winning streak at home. New Zealand played their next Tri-Nations match on 26 July against Australia in Sydney, losing 19–34 but a week later against Australia in New Zealand won 39–10. They then beat South Africa 19–0 at Newlands Stadium. New Zealand played their final match on 13 September against Australia at Suncorp Stadium in Brisbane winning 28–24 and retaining the Bledisloe Cup and the Tri-Nations.

The All Blacks opened the 2009 season with a 22–27 loss to France at Carisbrook, but defeated them 14–10 in Wellington a week later. On points difference, France won the Dave Gallaher Cup for the first time. A week later the All Blacks defeated Italy 27–6 in Christchurch. They finished second in the Tri-Nations Series, behind South Africa who lost only one game, and ended the series with a 33–6 win over Australia in Wellington.

In 2010, the All Blacks won the Tri-Nations Series for the tenth time after three successive victories against South Africa, and won the Bledisloe Cup after consecutive victories against Australia. An undefeated streak in tests that began in 2009 reached 15 matches. Despite losing the 2011 Tri-Nations after a loss to Australia in Brisbane, they still entered the 2011 Rugby World Cup as one of the favourites. The All Blacks went through their pool matches undefeated, and after defeating Argentina, and then Australia, faced France in the final. New Zealand scored one try and a penalty to narrowly win 8–7. Henry stepped down as coach following the World Cup, and was replaced as head coach by his assistant Steve Hansen.

=== Hansen era ===
The Tri-Nations was expanded to include Argentina in 2012, and subsequently renamed The Rugby Championship. The All Blacks went undefeated in the inaugural tournament, and went through the year unbeaten until their last match of the year, where they lost to England at Twickenham. In 2013 New Zealand hosted France in a three-match series – their first meeting since the 2011 World Cup final. They won all three tests, before going unbeaten in the 2013 Rugby Championship. In November 2013, New Zealand became the first rugby nation in the professional era to achieve a 100% record in a calendar year.

At the 2014 Rugby Championship, the All Blacks drew with Australia and lost to South Africa in the away matches, but won the other four matches and the tournament. At the shortened 2015 Rugby Championship, the All Blacks lost to Australia and was runner-up in the competition. They did, however achieve a significant return victory in the second Bledisloe test that year to retain the trophy. The team entered the 2015 Rugby World Cup and again went undefeated in their pool matches. They defeated France 62–13 in the quarter-finals, South Africa 20–18 in the semi-finals, and Australia 34–17 in the final to become the first nation to retain the World Championship title and the first to win the Rugby World Cup three times.

The All Blacks went undefeated at the 2016 Rugby Championship, claiming bonus points at each match, under new captain and Number 8, Kieran Read and vice-captain and fullback Ben Smith. Smith and wing Israel Dagg were also the joint highest try scorers in the competition with five each, while fly-half Beauden Barrett was the highest points scorer of the competition with 81 in total. The autumn of 2016 witnessed an historic defeat, with the All Blacks enduring their first ever loss to Ireland after 111 years of competition, going down by 29–40 at Soldier Field in Chicago. New Zealand redeemed the loss by defeating Ireland in Dublin in the return game two weeks later, by 21–9.

In 2017, the British & Irish Lions toured New Zealand for the second time in the professional era. The series finished in a draw, with the All Blacks and Lions recording 1–1–1. The All Blacks had won the first test 30–15, the Lions took the second test 24–21, and the final test was drawn 15–15. Like the 2005 tour, this Lions series was dogged by controversy, with the Lions' tactics (under expat Kiwi Coach Warren Gatland), the tone of local media coverage, the Red Card awarded to Sonny Bill Williams in the second test and the refereeing of French officials Romain Poite and Jerome Garces all hotly debated. The drawn series, combined with the loss to Ireland to previous year led some in the media to claim that the team were on the slide, and that the Northern Hemisphere sides were catching up. However they went on to go undefeated in the Rugby Championship 2017 season and also securing the Bledisloe Cup against rivals Australia after defeating the Aussies twice in the Rugby Championship. In October, New Zealand suffered a surprise 18–23 loss to Australia, in the final Bledisloe game of the year at Suncorp Stadium in Brisbane. The autumn saw the All Blacks defeat a Barbarians team 32–21, France 38–18, Scotland 22–17 and Wales 33–18 to end the 2017 season.

At the start of the 2018 season, the All Blacks saw off a touring French side in a 3–0 series victory, and won their first games of the Rugby Championship against Australia by 38–13 and 40–12 to keep the Bledisloe Cup for another year. Another easy win against Argentina by 46–24 followed, however the All Blacks were subsequently beaten at home in Wellington by South Africa for the first time since 2009, losing by 34–36 in a tightly contested game, before again beating Argentina by 35–17. In the return match against South Africa in Pretoria, the All Blacks trailed for much of the game but produced a thrilling comeback late the second half to win by 32–30. They went on to post another crushing win over Australia by 37–20 in Yokohama, to confirm a Bledisloe whitewash for the year. A development side was left behind to pummel Japan 69–31, while the first team travelled to Europe for the autumn internationals. That series proved a relatively difficult one for the All Blacks, with a single-point victory over England (16–15) in a very closely fought test, followed by a second-ever loss to Ireland by 9–16 in a cauldron atmosphere at the Aviva Stadium in Dublin. They went on to thrash Italy by 66–3 to finish their season with a win.

2019 was a mixed year for the All Blacks, starting their campaign with an unconvincing 20–16 win over a tough Argentine side, and a 16–16 draw against the Springboks. However, the next week they were given their joint worst loss in their history, once again to the Wallabies, 26–47, after Scott Barrett was sent off. They got back on track, showcasing the form they have been in the past years, with a 36–0 shutout in their rematch at Eden Park to retain the Bledisloe Cup, and finished their season with a 92–7 pummelling against Tonga.

The 2019 Rugby World Cup saw New Zealand face off first against South Africa. They won, 23–13 in Yokohama, then notched wins up on Canada and Namibia, scoring a total of 135 points in the 2 games. In the quarter-final, they faced off against Ireland in Chofu, dominating from start to finish and prevailing 46–14. The team's run ended in the semi-finals with a 7–19 loss to England in Yokohama, which ended their chances of a third consecutive world title, or "three-peat". This was the team's first World Cup defeat in 20 matches stretching back over twelve years. New Zealand finished their campaign with a 40–17 win over Wales in Chofu to claim the bronze medal. Hansen retired after the World Cup, along with many All Blacks veterans, most notably captain Kieran Read, Owen Franks and Ben Smith. Ian Foster was appointed as the new All Blacks coach.

=== Foster era ===
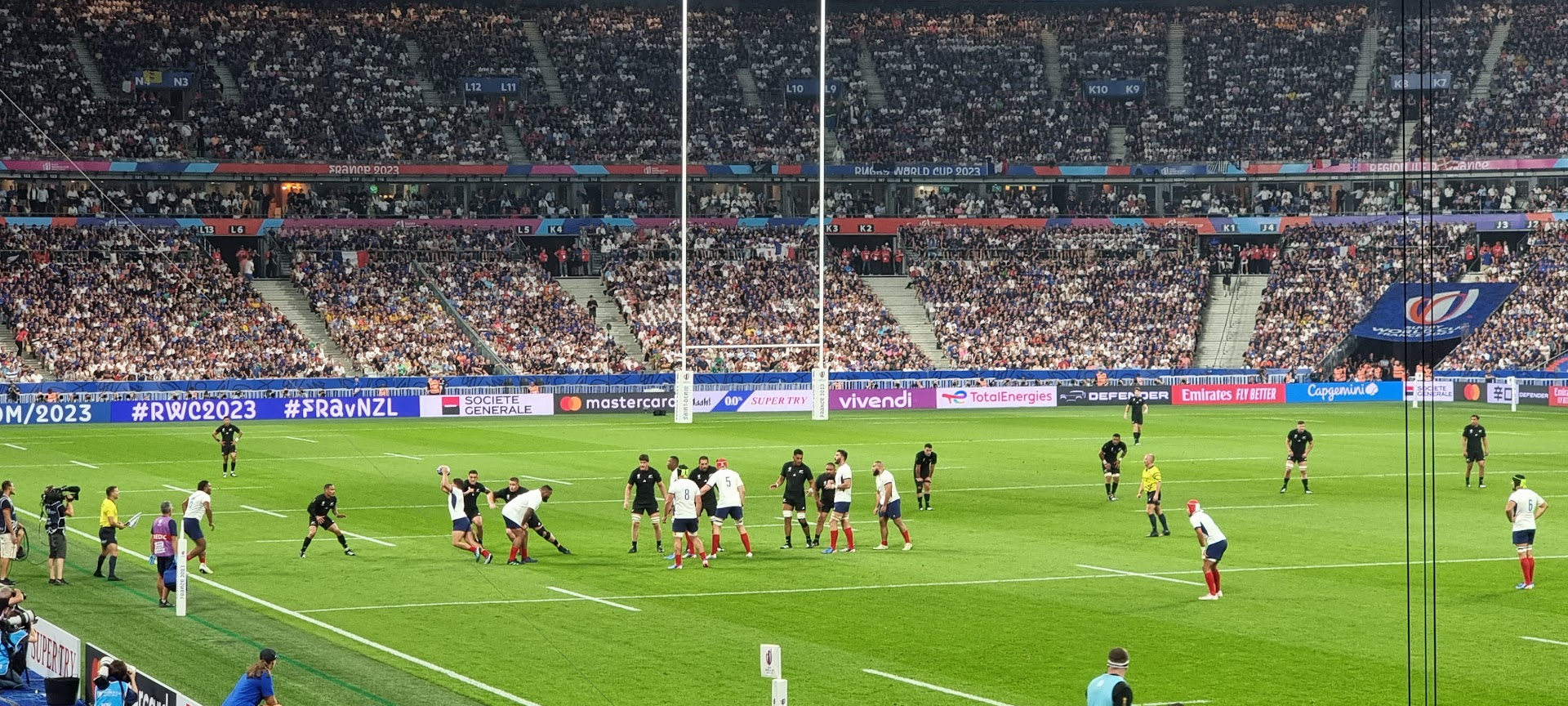
2023 Rugby World Cup match between France and New Zealand.

2020

Due to the COVID-19 pandemic, the 2020 Rugby Championship was cancelled. Instead, a Tri-Nations revival tournament was held from October to December 2020. Two warm-up Bledisloe Cup matches were held before that, the first was a (16–16) draw in Wellington and the second a (27–7) win in Auckland. They then travelled over to Australia for the Tri-Nations, where they opened by securing the Bledisloe Cup with a (43–5) victory over Australia in Sydney but going on to lose to them a week later (22–24) in Brisbane. The All Blacks lost a week later to Argentina (15–25) in Parramatta which was their first ever defeat to the Los Pumas and the first time they had lost back-to-back test matches since 2011. Thanks to a 38–0 win against Argentina two weeks later in Newcastle, the All Blacks won the Tri-Nations. They ended the 2020 season with three wins, two losses and a draw.

2021

The All Blacks opened their 2021 campaign by easily defeating Tonga (102–0) in Auckland, followed by two wins against Fiji (57–23) in Dunedin and (60–13) in Hamilton. They opened their Bledisloe Cup campaign by defeating Australia at Eden Park (33–25). The All Blacks then went onto defeat the Wallabies 2 more times, (57–22) at Eden Park again and (38–21) in Perth to retain the Bledisloe Cup. They defeated Argentina twice by comfortable margins, (39–0) in the Gold Coast and (36–13) in Brisbane. Against South Africa, their record was split (1-1), with New Zealand winning in the 100th Test Match between the two countries in a historic (19–17) victory in Townsville, with the Springboks winning a week later by (29–31) in the Gold Coast. They retained the Freedom Cup and they went on to win the Rugby Championship and finish the competition with a (5–1) record. In their first Northern Hemisphere Tour since 2018, the All Blacks played five matches and finished with a record of (3–2). They defeated the United States (104–14), Wales (54–16) and Italy (47–9), and then went onto lose two matches in a row against Ireland (20–29) and France (25–40), to finish the season (12–3). The back to back losses against Ireland and France was the first time since 1998 that they finished their season with 2 straight defeats in consecutive weeks.

2022

In July 2022, the All Blacks hosted Ireland to a 3-Test Match Series. In the first game the All Blacks defeated Ireland (42–19), before losing to them in the second game (12–23) and third game (22–32). It was the first time that Ireland had beaten the All Blacks in New Zealand, with two consecutive wins in a row and across a Test series. This also marked the third straight season that the All Blacks lost back to back test matches and this led them to make changes in their coaching setup. They opened their Rugby Championship campaign with a loss to the Springboks in Mbombela (10–26), their third consecutive loss. They then rallied back the following week with a win at Ellis Park (35–23) to retain the Freedom Cup. They lost to Argentina (18–25) for the first time in New Zealand, before bouncing back with a (53–3) victory a week later. They then defeated Australia in a controversial and much debated (39–37) win, thus retaining the Bledisloe Cup. The All Blacks went on to defeat the Wallabies again (40–14) at Eden Park in Auckland. In their End Of Year Northern Tour, they defeated Japan (38–31), Wales (55–23), Scotland (31–23) but drew against England (25–25). The All Blacks finished with eight wins, four losses and one draw. It was their worst win/loss record since the 1998 season.

2023

In 2023, the All Blacks won the shortened version of the Rugby Championship (due to the World Cup) by defeating Argentina (41–12), South Africa (35–20), and Australia (38–7). They also kept the Freedom Cup for another year after beating the Springboks and had wrapped up the Bledisloe for another year after defeating the Wallabies (23–20) in the 2nd Bledisloe game which was a test match outside the Rugby Championship. In a warm up game at Twickenham Stadium in London, the All Blacks lost to the Springboks (7–35), which became their worst ever defeat in their 120-year history. At the 2023 Rugby World Cup, the All Blacks tasted their first ever defeat in the pool stages when they were beaten by the host nation France (13–27). They defeated all the other teams in their pool, Namibia (71–3), Italy (96–17), Uruguay (73–0), to qualify for the quarter–finals. They defeated Ireland in the quarters (28–24), beat Argentina (44–6) in the semi–final, but lost to the Springboks (11–12), who became the first nation to win four World Cups, in the final of the 2023 Rugby World Cup tournament. They ended their season with a record of nine wins and three losses. This marked the end of the Ian Foster era.

=== Razor era ===
On March 21, 2023, Scott Robertson was named as All Blacks head coach from 2024. After the conclusion of the 2023 Rugby World Cup tournament, Robertson commenced the role of head coach from November 1, 2023.

2024

Robertson's first game as head coach took place against England in 2024. Robertson's All Blacks team defeated England (16–15) at Forsyth Barr Stadium, in Dunedin. A week later in Eden Park, in Auckland, the All Blacks defeated England again (24–17). The All Blacks then travelled to San Diego, California, to face Fiji and defeated them (47–5). In the 2024 Rugby Championship, the All Blacks compiled a 3–3 record as they struggled and were outscored in the last 20 minutes in 5 of the 6 games. They split against Argentina, were swept by South Africa and then went on to sweep Australia. In the All Blacks Northern end of year tour, they beat Japan (64–19) in Yokohama, beat England (24–22) at Allianz Stadium, Twickenham and swept them 3–0 in 2024, beat Ireland (23–13) at the Aviva Stadium and lost to France (29–30) in the Stade de France before bouncing back a week later and defeating Italy (29–11) in Turin to go 4 wins from 5 against the Northern Hemisphere teams. In 2024, Scott Robertson had a 10–4 record in his first season as head coach.

2025

The All Blacks kicked off their 2025 campaign with a 3-test series against France. They swept the French to win the series (3–0) with victories in Dunedin (31–27), Wellington (43–17), and Hamilton (29–19). In the 2025 Rugby Championship, the All Blacks compiled a (4–2) record. They split both games with Argentina with the All Blacks winning (41–24) in Córdoba, but suffered a first ever defeat to the Puma's on Argentine soil a week later with a (23–29) loss in Buenos Aires. The All Blacks also split both games with South Africa with New Zealand winning (24–17) in Eden Park, but were demolished a week later by the Springboks with a (10–43) loss in Wellington, which is their heaviest defeat in test match history, their worst ever loss at home and their worst ever defeat to the Springboks. South Africa broke their own record from 2 years prior when they gave New Zealand their previous worst defeat at Twickenham in London with a (35–7) victory over the All Blacks. They then went onto defeat the Wallabies twice to retain the Bledisloe Cup with a (33–24) victory at Eden Park, and a (28–14) win at Optus Stadium in Perth. In their Northern end of year tour, the All Blacks attempted their first grand slam since 2010. They defeated Ireland in Chicago (26–13), Scotland at Murrayfield (25–17), but failed at their attempt of a grand slam after losing to England (19–33) at Twickenham. They bounced back a week later by defeating Wales (52–26) in Cardiff to finish their season with 10 wins and 3 losses.

In January 2026, it was announced that Scott Robertson would be departing from the All Blacks head coach position following a mutual agreement with New Zealand Rugby.

=== Rennie era ===
On March 4, 2026, Dave Rennie was named as All Blacks head coach through to the 2027 Rugby World Cup.

== Uniform ==
All Blacks historic jerseys

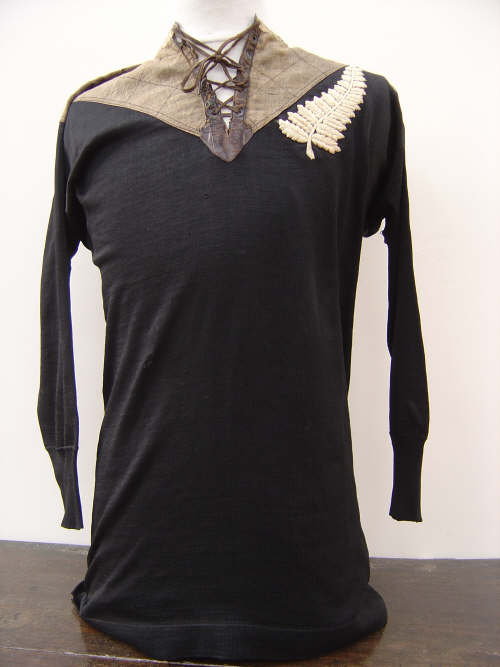
The 1905 "Originals" jersey

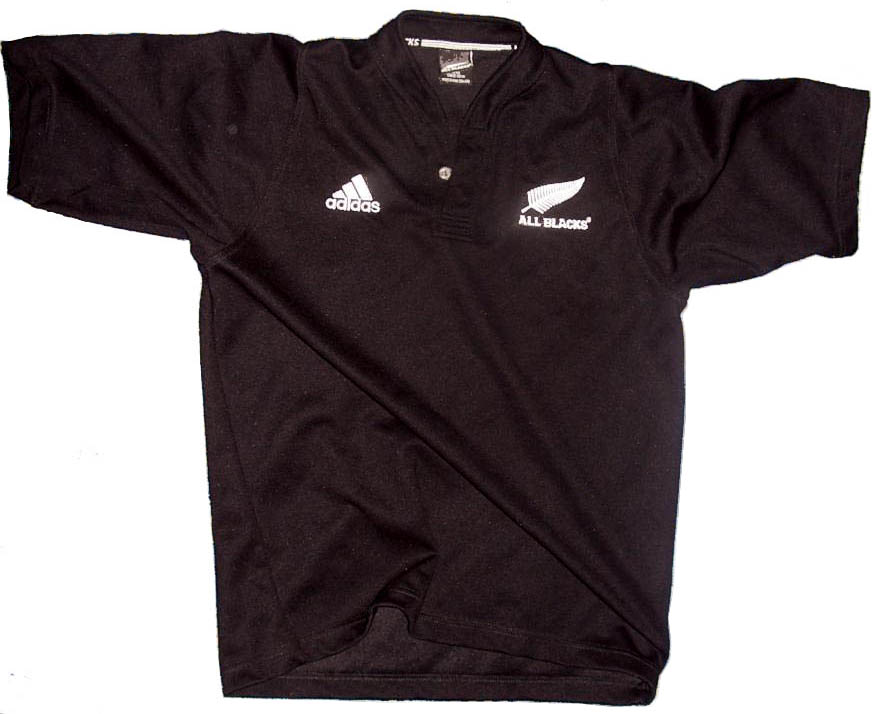
The Adidas July 2003 to August 2005 jersey

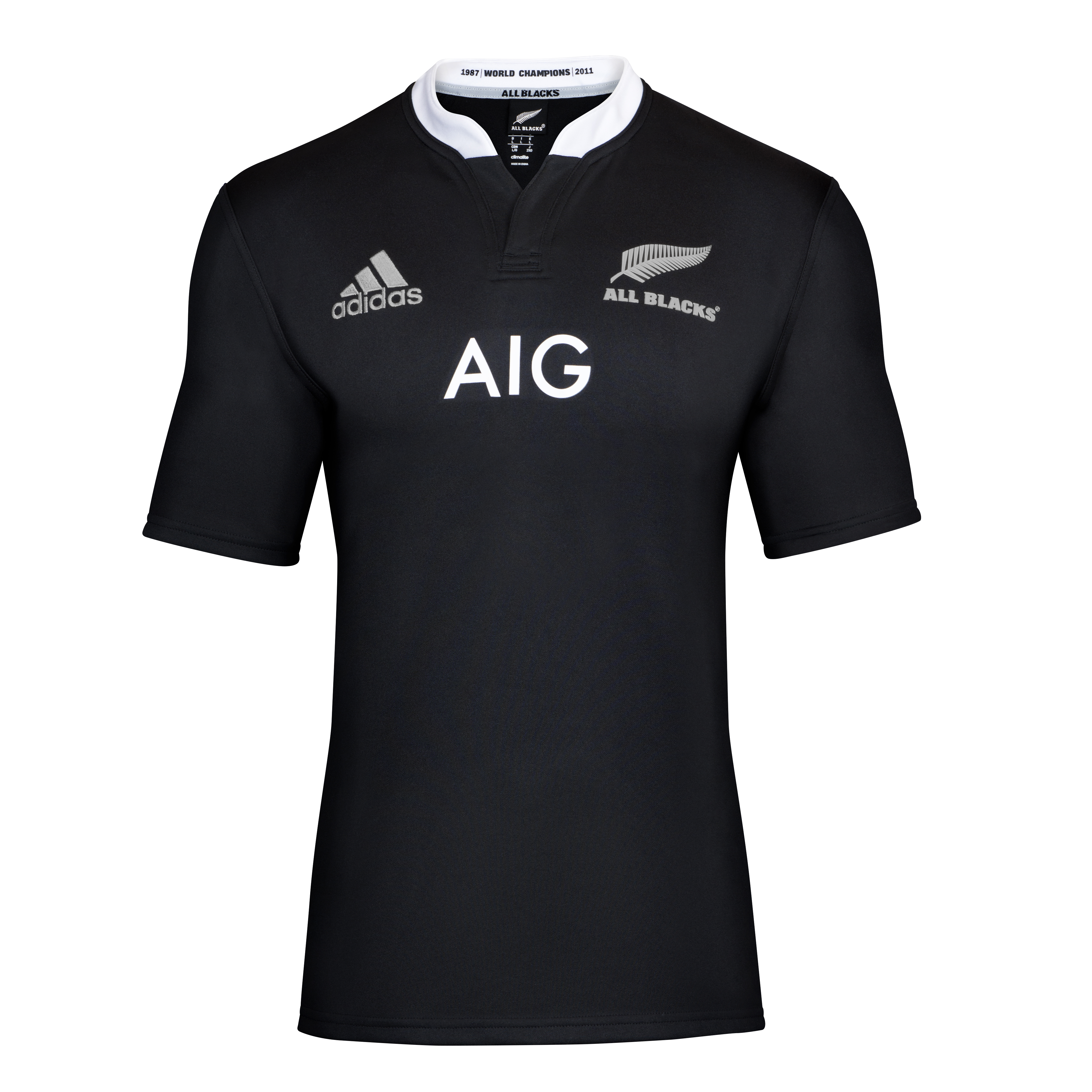
The 2012 jersey, sponsored by AIG

The current New Zealand jersey features a figure-hugging jersey and is entirely black except for sponsors' logos and the NZRU silver fern on the chest.

The team has not always played in black; for the 1884 tour of Australia which was the first overseas New Zealand rugby tour, the team donned a dark blue jersey, with a gold fern insignia on the left of the jumper.

The black jersey with silver fern had first been worn in Australia and the United Kingdom by the New Zealand Natives in 1888 and 1889, as well as various rugby clubs formed by New Zealanders in San Francisco and Sydney. In 1893, when the New Zealand Rugby Union was established, they stipulated that the uniform would be a black jersey with silver fern and white knickerbockers, although historic photographs suggest white shorts may have been used instead during these early years. There was a change some time after 1897, and in 1901 the team met New South Wales wearing an all black uniform for the first time - black jersey, a canvas top with no collar, and a silver fern, and black shorts.

In 2006, New Zealand wore an embroidered remembrance poppy on their jersey sleeve when playing France during the end-of-year tour. The poppy honours the ANZAC soldiers who died on the beaches of Gallipoli. Captain Richie McCaw said "We want to honour the overseas service of New Zealanders. It is an important part of our history as a country and a team."

During the 2011 Rugby World Cup, there was an image of the Webb Ellis Cup embroidered on the sleeve of the All Blacks' jerseys, with the year '1987' below it to signify the team's previous world title. Each of the four teams that had won the cup in previous years sported the same detailing on their jerseys.

=== Kit suppliers ===
Canterbury were kit suppliers to New Zealand from 1924 until 1999, when Adidas paid $70 million to clothe and shoe the All Blacks for five years. Nike also looked at sponsoring New Zealand at this time, but elected to sponsor Tiger Woods instead. In 2003, Adidas renewed this contract and paid the team US$200 million over nine years, expecting New Zealand to win around 75% of their matches. In 2008, this deal was extended to 2019 for an undisclosed amount, In 2017 this was again extended to 2023 in a deal estimated to be worth about $10 million a year. In 2023, the All Blacks and Adidas renewed their partnership ahead of the 2023 Rugby World Cup for an undisclosed amount and period.

Period	Kit manufacturer
1924–1999	Canterbury
1999–present	Adidas

=== Kit sponsors ===
Steinlager was the first sponsor to appear on the All Blacks' jersey, in the left breast of the jersey (on the opposite side to the silver fern), lasting from 1994 to 1999, when Adidas took over as supplier. In 2012, AIG became the first to sponsor on the centre-front of the All Black jersey in a deal estimated to be worth approximately $80 million over five years. AIG extended this sponsorship to 2021 in a deal thought to be worth about $15m a year. After AIG decided not to renew their sponsorship deal with the team, it was announced that the Altrad Group would be the new main sponsor of the All Blacks from 2022, with a 6-year deal reportedly worth more than $120 million.

== Haka ==
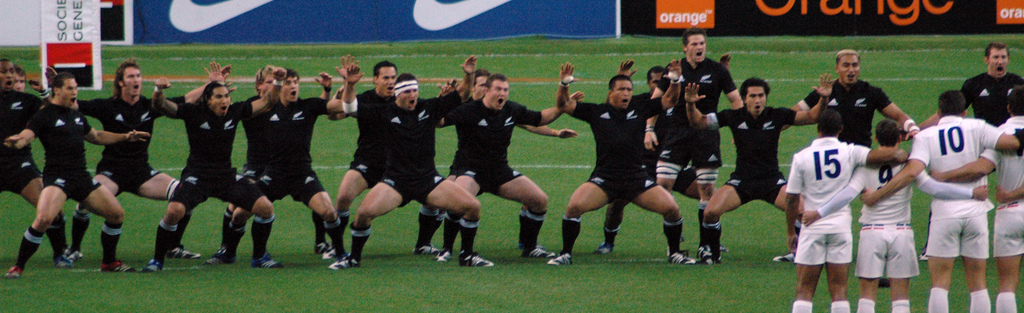
The New Zealand team performing Ka Mate, led by Richie McCaw, before a match against France in November 2006

The All Blacks perform a haka (a Māori challenge) before every international match. The tradition has been closely associated with New Zealand rugby ever since a tour of Australia and the United Kingdom by the New Zealand Natives in 1888 and 1889, and earlier with the 1884 New Zealand team that toured New South Wales who also performed a haka. The 1888–89 New Zealand native team used Ake Ake Kia Kaha, and a mocking haka, Tupoto koe, Kangaru!, was used by the 1903 team that visited Australia. In 1905, the All Blacks began the tradition of using Ka Mate, a haka composed in the 19th century by Te Rauparaha, leader of the Ngāti Toa tribe. The 1924 All Blacks used a specially composed haka, Ko Niu Tireni, but later All Blacks reverted to using Ka Mate.

In August 2005, before the Tri-Nations test match between New Zealand and South Africa at Carisbrook stadium in Dunedin, the All Blacks performed a new haka, Kapa o Pango, specially composed for the occasion by Derek Lardelli and intended to reflect the Polynesian-influenced multicultural make-up of contemporary New Zealand. Lardelli's haka was not designed to replace Ka Mate as it was only meant to be used for special occasions. Kapa o Pango concludes with a move that has been interpreted as a "throat slitting" gesture, which has led to accusations that the haka encourages violence and sends the wrong message to All Blacks fans. However, according to Lardelli, the gesture is meant to represent "drawing vital energy into the heart and lungs".

In November 2006, at the Millennium Stadium in Cardiff, Wales, the All Blacks performed the haka in the dressing room prior to the match – instead of on the field immediately before kick-off – following a disagreement with the Welsh Rugby Union, who had wanted Wales to sing their national anthem immediately after the haka. In 2008, New Zealand played Munster at Thomond Park; before the match, Munster's four New Zealand players challenged their opponents by performing their own haka before the All Blacks started theirs. On the same tour, Wales responded to New Zealand's haka by silently refusing to move afterwards, and the two teams simply stared at each other until the referee forced them to start the game.

== Record ==
=== Overall ===
Men's World Rugby Rankings Top 20 as of 16 November 2026
Rank	Change (Note: Change from the previous week)	Team	Points
1	Steady	South Africa	91.53
2	Steady	New Zealand	90.65
3	▲1	France	89.05
4	▼1	Ireland	88.70
5	Steady	England	86.99
6	Steady	Scotland	85.28
7	Steady	Australia	82.24
8	Steady	Argentina	82.09
9	▲1	Wales	79.37
10	▼1	Fiji	77.79
11	Steady	Italy	75.84
12	Steady	Japan	75.25
13	Steady	Georgia	74.23
14	▲1	United States	68.39
15	▼1	Portugal	68.24
16	▲3	Samoa	67.60
17	▲1	Chile	67.00
18	▼2	Spain	66.53
19	▼2	Tonga	65.58
20	Steady	Uruguay	65.17

**New_Zealand's historical rankings**

Source: World Rugby
Graph updated to 16 November 2026

New Zealand have been beaten by seven test nations (and drawing to an additional nation in Scotland) and two combined teams (the British & Irish Lions, and a World XV) and they are the only international team to have a winning record against every nation they have played. They have won 516 of their 675 test matches (76.44 per cent; see table below) and have lost at home only 43 times. Since World Rankings were introduced by World Rugby in October 2003, New Zealand have occupied the number one ranking the majority of the time. In the decade from 2000 to 2009, New Zealand won 100 tests (92% of their total games played).

New Zealand's longest winning streak is 18 test victories (a Tier 1 joint world record), achieved between 2015 and 2016. In 2013 they won every test they played during a calendar year. The All Blacks hold the record for most consecutive test wins at home, a 47–match winning streak, achieved between 2009 and 2017. Their longest unbeaten streak is 23 tests (from 1987 to 1990) with one game being drawn.

Their all-time points record for tests stands at 19,406 points for and 9,554 points against (updated 14 November 2026). Many national rugby union teams have suffered their heaviest defeats when playing against New Zealand, these being Argentina (91–8), Fiji (91–0), France (61–10), Ireland (60–0), Japan (145–17), Samoa (101–14), South Africa (57–0), Tonga (102–0, twice) and the British and Irish Lions (38–6). The All Blacks largest test win was a (145–17) victory against Japan in 1995, while their heaviest loss was a (10–43) defeat to the Springboks in 2025.

Below is a summary of New Zealand test results (updated 14 November 2026):

Opponent	Played	Won	Lost	Drawn	Win%	For	Aga	Diff
Argentina	41	36	4	1	87.8%	1,570	609	+961
Australia	183	130	45	8	71.04%	4,146	2,682	+1,464
British & Irish Lions	41	30	7	4	73.17%	700	399	+301
Canada	6	6	0	0	100%	376	54	+322
England	47	36	9	2	76.6%	1,100	706	+394
Fiji	8	8	0	0	100%	528	91	+437
France	68	52	15	1	76.47%	1,800	993	+807
Georgia	1	1	0	0	100%	43	10	+33
Ireland	40	34	5	1	85%	1,130	558	+572
Italy	18	18	0	0	100%	1,039	185	+854
Japan	6	6	0	0	100%	453	111	+342
Namibia	3	3	0	0	100%	200	26	+174
Pacific Islanders	1	1	0	0	100%	41	26	+15
Portugal	1	1	0	0	100%	108	13	+95
Romania	2	2	0	0	100%	99	14	+85
Samoa	7	7	0	0	100%	411	72	+339
Scotland	34	32	0	2	94.12%	1,021	410	+611
South Africa	114	64	46	4	56%	2,380	1,964	+416
Tonga	7	7	0	0	100%	520	42	+478
United States	4	4	0	0	100%	275	29	+246
Uruguay	1	1	0	0	100%	73	0	+73
Wales	39	35	4	0	89.74%	1,299	491	+808
World XV	3	2	1	0	66.67%	94	69	+25
Total	675	516	136	23	76%	19,406	9,554	+9,852

=== Rugby World Cup ===
Rugby World Cup record
Year	Round	Pld	W	D	L	PF	PA	Squad
(New Zealand) (Australia) 1987	**Champions**	6	6	0	0	298	52	Squad
(England) (France) (Ireland) (Scotland) (Wales) 1991	Third place	6	5	0	1	143	74	Squad
(South Africa) 1995	Runners-up	6	5	0	1	327	119	Squad
(Wales) 1999	Fourth place	6	4	0	2	255	111	Squad
(Australia) 2003	Third place	7	6	0	1	361	101	Squad
(France) 2007	Quarter-finals	5	4	0	1	327	55	Squad
(New Zealand) 2011	**Champions**	7	7	0	0	301	72	Squad
(England) 2015	**Champions**	7	7	0	0	290	97	Squad
(Japan) 2019	Third place	7	5	1	1	250	72	Squad
(France) 2023	Runners-up	7	5	0	2	336	89	Squad
(Australia) 2027	Qualified							
(United States) 2031	To be determined							
Total	—	64	54	1	9	2888	842	—
**Champions**; Runners–up; Third place; Fourth place; Home venue

During Typhoon Hagibis; New Zealand v Italy was to be cancelled and recorded as 0–0 draw New Zealand have won the World Cup three times. They beat France in the final of the 1987 inaugural competition held in New Zealand and Australia, defeated France again in the final of the 2011 tournament, also hosted in New Zealand, and most recently defeated Australia in England in 2015, making them the first team to win the World Cup in consecutive tournaments. In 1991, they lost their semi-final to Australia before winning the playoff for third. In 1995, they reached the final, before losing in extra time to hosts South Africa. They finished in fourth place in 1999, after losing their semi-final and then the third-place playoff game. In 2003, New Zealand were knocked out by hosts Australia in their semi-final, before finishing third. The 2007 World Cup saw their worst tournament, being knocked out in the quarter-finals by the host nation France; until this they were the only team to have reached the semi-finals of every tournament. As a result of the poor performance in the 2007 World Cup the NZRU commissioned a 47-page report to detail the causes of the failure. In 2019, they lost in the semi-finals against England in a (7–19) defeat, and then finishing in third-place after beating Wales in the 3rd spot playoff game (40–17). In 2023, the All Blacks were defeated by the Springboks (11–12) in the final. The All Blacks had won every World Cup pool match they had played in until 8 September 2023 when they lost their first ever pool match in the opening match of the 2023 Rugby World Cup against the host nation France, and have finished top of their pool in 9 out of the 10 tournaments.

New Zealand holds several World Cup records: most World Cup matches (63), most points in one match (145 versus Japan in 1995), most cumulative points over all World Cups (2,888), most tries overall (396), most conversions (289) and also the record for the most points scored in the first half of a knockout game at the Rugby World Cup (29, against France 2015) along with the largest knockout margin (49) in the same match. They currently hold the record for the most consecutive wins at a World Cup, with 18 straight wins, spanning from 2011 to 2019. Several individual players also hold World Cup records, Jonah Lomu for most World Cup tries (15 over two World Cups, tied with South Africa's Bryan Habana), Marc Ellis with most tries in a match (6 versus Japan in 1995), Grant Fox with most points in one tournament (126 in 1987), and Simon Culhane with most points in a single game (45 versus Japan in 1995).

=== Tri Nations and The Rugby Championship ===
New Zealand's only annual tournament is a competition involving the Southern Hemisphere's top national teams. From 1996 through 2011, they competed in the Tri Nations against Australia and South Africa. In 2012, Argentina joined the competition, which was renamed The Rugby Championship. New Zealand's record of 20 tournament wins (the most recent in 2023) and 107 match wins is well ahead of the other teams records. The Bledisloe Cup is contested between New Zealand and Australia, and the Freedom Cup between New Zealand and South Africa, as part of the Tri Nations and The Rugby Championship.

Tri Nations Series (1996–2011; 2020)
Nation	Matches				Points			Bonus points	Table points	Titles won
Nation	P	W	D	L	PF	PA	PD	Bonus points	Table points	Titles won
New Zealand	76	52	0	24	2,054	1,449	+605	35	**243**	**11**
Australia	76	30	3	43	1,591	1,817	−226	34	**160**	**3**
South Africa	72	28	1	43	1,480	1,831	−351	24	**138**	**3**
Argentina	4	1	2	1	56	84	–28	0	**8**	**0**

Source: lassen.co.nz – Tri-Nations, Australia, New Zealand, South Africa

Bonus points given by T – 4W − 2D, for T table points, W games won and D games drawn.

Rugby Championship (since 2012)
Nation	Matches				Points			Bonus points	Table points	Titles won
Nation	P	W	D	L	PF	PA	PD	Bonus points	Table points	Titles won
New Zealand	69	55	2	12	2,313	1,348	+965	43	**268**	**9**
South Africa	69	37	4	28	1,845	1,534	+311	33	**185**	**3**
Australia	69	28	3	38	1,563	1,900	−337	16	**141**	**1**
Argentina	69	14	1	54	1,358	2,277	−919	16	**66**	**0**

Updated: 4 October 2025
Source: lassen.co.nz – TRC, Argentina, Australia, New Zealand, South Africa
Bonus points given by T – 4W − 2D, for T table points, W games won and D games drawn.

All-time Tri Nations Series and Rugby Championship Table (since 1996)
Nation	Matches				Points			Bonus points	Table points	Titles won
Nation	P	W	D	L	PF	PA	PD	Bonus points	Table points	Titles won
New Zealand	145	107	2	36	4,367	2,797	+1,570	78	**511**	**20**
South Africa	141	65	5	71	3,325	3,365	–40	57	**323**	**6**
Australia	145	58	6	81	3,154	3,717	–563	50	**301**	**4**
Argentina	73	15	3	55	1,414	2,361	–947	16	**74**	**0**

Updated: 4 October 2025
Bonus points given by T – 4W − 2D, for T table points, W games won and D games drawn.

=== Series played ===
New Zealand's home and away series' played total
Team	Series stats					Home Series	Away Series
Team	P	W	D	L	%	Home Series	Away Series
Argentina	4	4	0	0	100.00	**1989**, **1997**	**1985**, **1991**
Australia	31	24	1	6	77.42	**1913**, **1936**, **1946**, 1949, 1952, **1955**, **1958**, **1962**, **1964**, **1972**, **1978**, **1982**, 1986, **1990**	**1907**, **1910**, **1914**, 1929, **1932**, 1934, **1938**, **1947**, **1951**, **1957**, **1962**, **1968**, **1974**, 1980, **1984**, **1988**, 1992
British & Irish Lions	12	10	1	1	83.33	**1904**, **1908**, **1930**, **1950**, **1959**, **1966**, 1971, **1977**, **1983**, **1993**, **2005**, 2017	
England (Note: Early in the history between the Home Nations meetings with Australia and the southern hemisphere teams (typically Australia, New Zealand and South Africa), New Zealand would play a one-off match in a tour against one, two, three or all four Home Nations teams. These were considered a tour and not a series.)	8	8	0	0	100.00	**1963**, **1985**, **1998**, **2004**, **2008**, **2014**, **2024**	**1997**
Fiji	1	1	0	0	100.00	**2021**	
France	18	11	6	1	61.11	**1961**, **1968**, 1979, **1984**, **1989**, 1994, **2007**, 2009, **2013**, **2018**, **2025**	1977, **1981**, 1986, **1990**, 1995, 2000, **2006**
Ireland	5	4	0	1	80.00	**1992**, **2002**, **2006**, **2012**, 2022	
Scotland	4	4	0	0	100.00	**1981**, **1990**, **1996**, **2000**	
South Africa	13	5	2	6	38.46	1921, 1937, **1956**, **1965**, **1981**, **1994**	1928, 1949, 1960, 1970, 1976, **1996**, 2026
Wales	4	4	0	0	100.00	**1969**, **1988**, **2010**, **2016**	
World XV	1	1	0	0	100.00	**1992**	
Total	101	76	10	15	75.25	Years	
Team	Series stats					Years	
Team	P	W	D	L	%	Years	
• **Bold text** denotes series was won by New Zealand • Italic text denotes series was drawn

== Players ==
=== Current squad ===
On 26 October, 2026, New Zealand named a 36-player squad ahead of the 2026 Nations Championship Northern Hemisphere Series.

Unavailable due to injury: Tamaiti Williams, Ruben Love, Patrick Tuipulotu, Ardie Savea, Luke Jacobson, Billy Proctor, Caleb Clarke, Ollie Norris, Samisoni Taukei'aho, Shannon Frizell, Tyrel Lomax, Leroy Carter.

On 16 November, 2026, Jamie Hannah and Quinn Tupaea were ruled out for the rest of the Nations Championship due to injury. Sam Darry and Billy Proctor were called in as replacements.

Head Coach: (New Zealand) Dave Rennie

- Caps Updated: 14 November 2026 (After New Zealand v Wales)

Player	Position	Date of birth (age)	Caps	Franchise/province
Codie Taylor (c)	Hooker	31 March 1991 (aged 35)	115	(New Zealand) Crusaders / Canterbury
Asafo Aumua	Hooker	5 May 1997 (aged 29)	29	(New Zealand) Hurricanes / Wellington
George Bell	Hooker	29 January 2002 (aged 24)	5	(New Zealand) Crusaders / Canterbury
Ethan de Groot	Prop	22 July 1998 (aged 28)	47	(New Zealand) Highlanders / Southland
George Bower	Prop	28 May 1992 (aged 34)	33	(New Zealand) Crusaders / Otago
Xavier Numia	Prop	29 November 1998 (aged 27)	7	(New Zealand) Hurricanes / Wellington
Fletcher Newell	Prop	1 March 2000 (aged 26)	45	(New Zealand) Crusaders / Canterbury
Pasilio Tosi	Prop	18 July 1998 (aged 28)	21	(New Zealand) Hurricanes / Bay of Plenty
Saula Ma'u	Prop	29 April 2000 (aged 26)	0	(New Zealand) Highlanders / Otago
Scott Barrett	Lock	20 November 1993 (aged 32)	93	(New Zealand) Crusaders / Taranaki
Josh Lord	Lock	17 January 2001 (aged 25)	19	(New Zealand) Chiefs / Taranaki
Fabian Holland	Lock	9 October 2002 (aged 24)	17	(New Zealand) Highlanders / Otago
Sam Darry	Lock	18 July 2000 (aged 26)	12	(New Zealand) Blues / Canterbury
Tupou Vaa'i	Lock	27 January 2000 (aged 26)	54	(New Zealand) Chiefs / Taranaki
Anton Segner	Loose forward	24 July 2001 (aged 25)	5	(New Zealand) Blues / Auckland
Leicester Fainga'anuku	Loose forward	11 October 1999 (aged 26)	13	(New Zealand) Crusaders / Tasman
Ethan Blackadder	Loose forward	22 March 1995 (aged 31)	16	(New Zealand) Crusaders / Tasman
Christian Lio-Willie	Loose forward	26 August 1998 (aged 28)	5	(New Zealand) Crusaders / Otago
Peter Lakai	Loose forward	4 March 2003 (aged 23)	18	(New Zealand) Hurricanes / Wellington
Wallace Sititi	Loose forward	7 September 2002 (aged 24)	27	(New Zealand) Chiefs / North Harbour
Cam Roigard	Half-back	16 November 2000 (aged 25)	27	(New Zealand) Hurricanes / Counties Manukau
Kyle Preston	Half-back	13 September 1999 (aged 27)	7	(New Zealand) Crusaders / Wellington
Cortez Ratima	Half-back	22 March 2001 (aged 25)	27	(New Zealand) Chiefs / Waikato
Richie Mo'unga	First five-eighth	25 May 1994 (aged 32)	58	(New Zealand) Crusaders / Canterbury
Damian McKenzie	First five-eighth	20 April 1995 (aged 31)	84	(New Zealand) Chiefs / Waikato
Josh Jacomb	First five-eighth	23 June 2001 (aged 25)	0	(New Zealand) Chiefs / Taranaki
Jordie Barrett	Centre	17 February 1997 (aged 29)	87	(New Zealand) Hurricanes / Taranaki
Billy Proctor	Centre	14 May 1999 (aged 27)	13	(New Zealand) Hurricanes / Wellington
Timoci Tavatavanawai	Centre	14 February 1998 (aged 28)	4	(New Zealand) Highlanders / Tasman
Anton Lienert-Brown	Centre	15 April 1995 (aged 31)	95	(New Zealand) Chiefs / Waikato
Rieko Ioane	Wing	18 March 1997 (aged 29)	93	(New Zealand) Blues / Auckland
Chay Fihaki	Wing	3 January 2001 (aged 25)	1	(New Zealand) Crusaders / Canterbury
Fehi Fineanganofo	Wing	31 August 2002 (aged 24)	2	(New Zealand) Hurricanes / Bay of Plenty
Josh Moorby	Fullback	11 July 1998 (aged 28)	9	(New Zealand) Hurricanes / Waikato
Will Jordan	Fullback	24 February 1998 (aged 28)	64	(New Zealand) Crusaders / Tasman
Beauden Barrett	Fullback	27 May 1991 (aged 35)	149	(New Zealand) Blues / Taranaki

=== Notable players ===
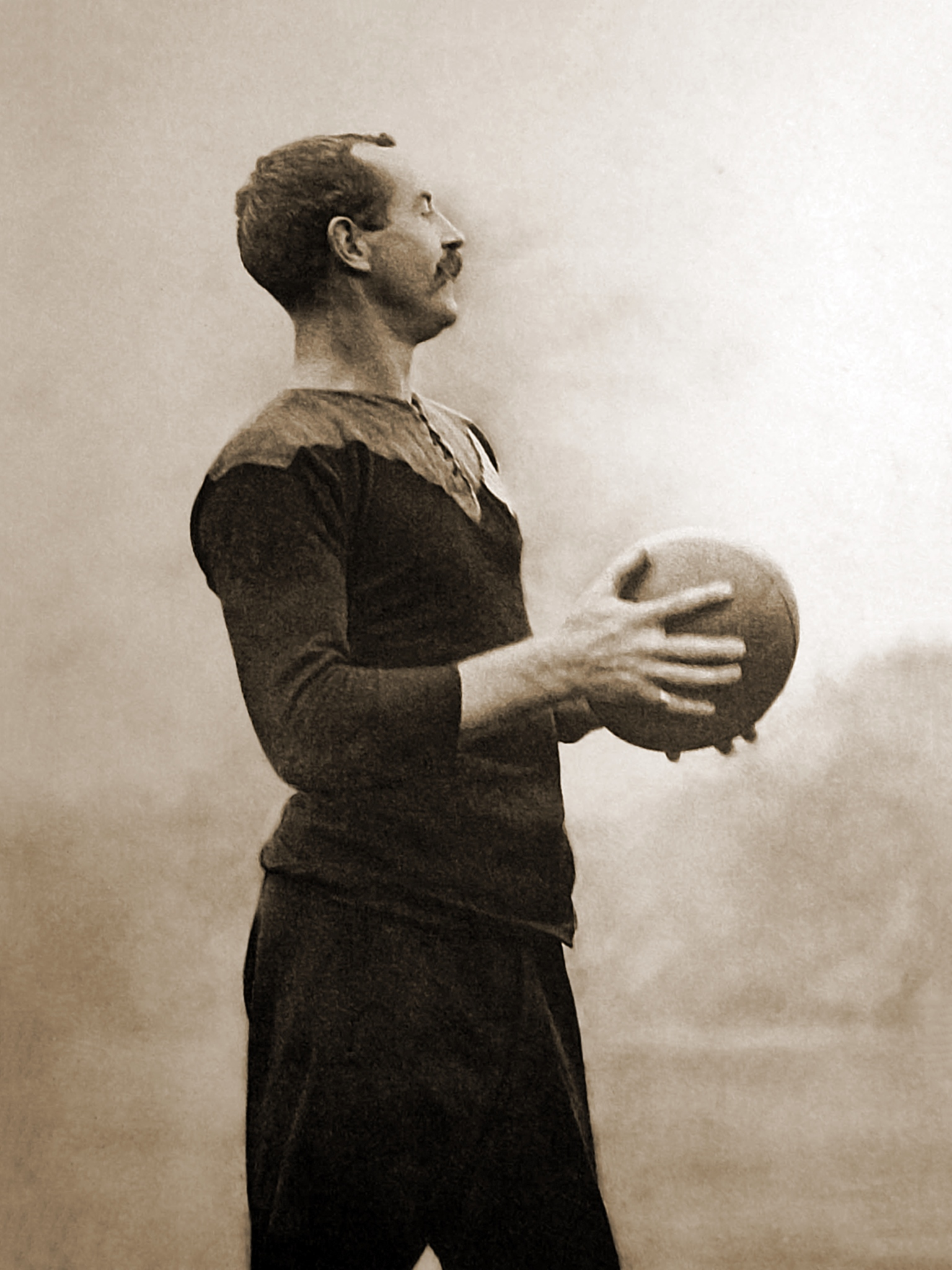
Captain of the "Original All Blacks" that toured the United Kingdom in 1905, Dave Gallaher is an inductee into the World Rugby Hall of Fame

Nineteen former All Blacks have been inducted into the World Rugby Hall of Fame: Sir Fred Allen, Dan Carter, Don Clarke, Sean Fitzpatrick, Grant Fox, Dave Gallaher, Sir Michael Jones, Ian Kirkpatrick, Sir John Kirwan, Sir Brian Lochore, Jonah Lomu, Richie McCaw, Sir Colin Meads, Graham Mourie, George Nēpia, Sir Bryan Williams, Sir Wilson Whineray, and Joe Warbrick.

Joe Warbrick represented New Zealand on their historic 1884 tour to Australia, but is better known for selecting and captaining the 1888–89 New Zealand Native football team that embarked on a 107-match tour of New Zealand, Australia and the British Isles. The New Zealand Natives were the first New Zealand team to wear black uniforms, and the first to perform a haka.

Dave Gallaher played in New Zealand's first ever test match in 1903 and also captained the 1905 Originals. Along with Billy Stead, Gallaher wrote the famous rugby book The Complete Rugby Footballer. At the age of only 19, George Nēpia played in all 30 matches on the Invincibles tour of 1924–25. Nēpia played 37 All Blacks games; his last was against the British Isles in 1930.

Sir Fred Allen captained all of his 21 matches for New Zealand, including six tests, between 1946 and 1949. He eventually moved on to coaching New Zealand between 1966 and 1968. New Zealand won all 14 of their test matches with Allen as coach.

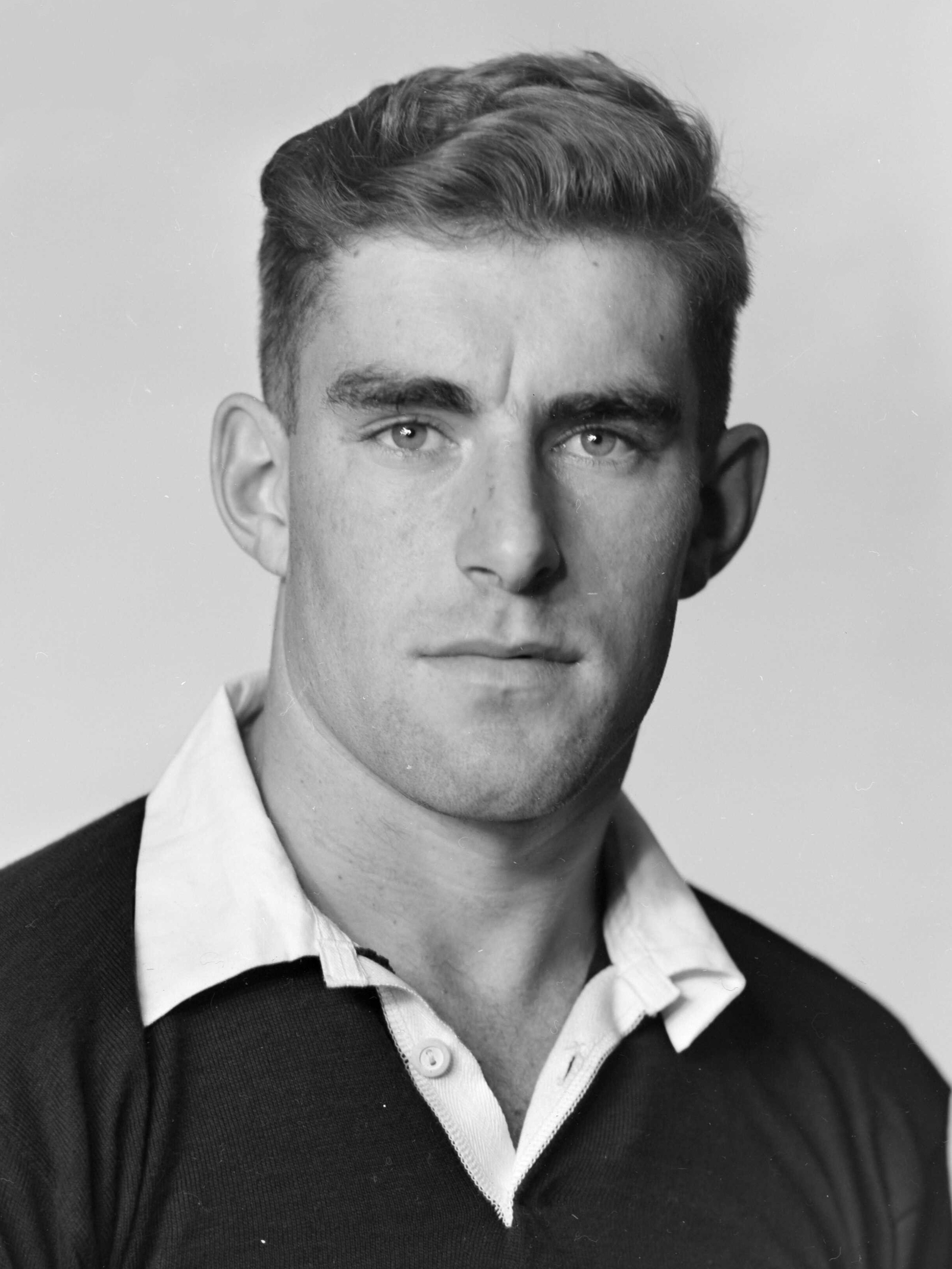
Colin Meads (pictured in 1956), New Zealand's player of the century

Five hall of Fame inductees, including the first New Zealander named to the World Rugby Hall of Fame, played during the 1960s. Don Clarke was an All Black between 1956 and 1964 and during this period he broke the record at the time for All Black test points. Clarke famously scored six penalties in one match – a record at the time – to give New Zealand an 18–17 victory over the British Isles at Dunedin in 1959. Sir Wilson Whineray played 32 tests, captaining New Zealand in 30 of them. He played prop and also number 8 between 1957 and 1965. New Zealand lost only four of their 30 tests with Whineray as captain. On 21 October 2007, Whineray became the first New Zealander to earn induction to the World Rugby Hall of Fame. In Sir Colin Meads' New Zealand Rugby Museum profile, he is described as "New Zealand's equivalent of Australia's Sir Donald Bradman or the United States of America's Babe Ruth". Meads, nicknamed Pinetree, played 133 games for New Zealand, including 55 tests. In 1999 the New Zealand Rugby Monthly magazine named Meads the New Zealand player of the century. Ian Kirkpatrick played 39 tests, including nine as captain, between 1967 and 1977. He scored 16 tries in his test career, a record at the time.

There were two players in the Hall of Fame to debut in the 1970s one was flanker Graham Mourie. He captained 19 of his 21 tests and 57 of his 61 overall All Blacks matches between 1976 and 1982. Most notably, in 1978 he was captain of the first All Blacks side to complete a Grand Slam over the four Home Nations sides.

The 1987 World Cup champions were coached by Sir Brian Lochore who had represented New Zealand in 25 tests between 1964 and 1971, including 17 as captain. He was knighted in 1999 for his lifetime services to rugby. Four of the 1987 World Cup squad that he had coached are also inductees in the Hall of Fame. Sir John Kirwan played a total of 63 tests between 1984 and 1994, scoring 35 tries, an All Blacks record at the time. In the 1987 World Cup opener against Italy, Kirwan raced 90 meters to score one of the tries of the tournament.

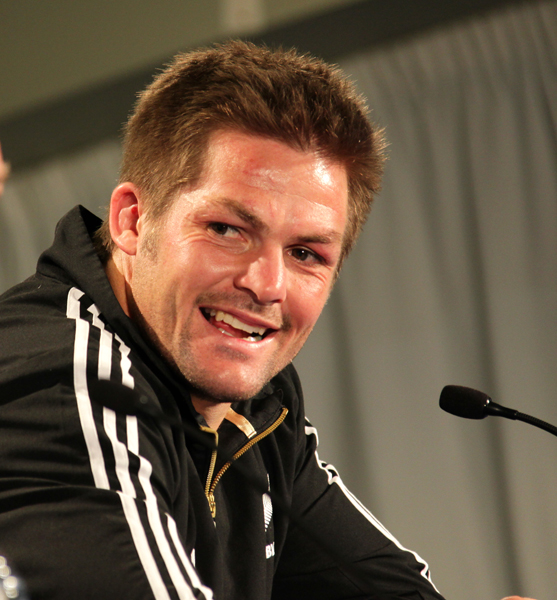
Richie McCaw is the fourth most capped rugby player of all time after Alun Wyn Jones, James Slipper, Sam Whitelock and Beauden Barrett, and was the first New Zealander to play 100 test matches

An All Black from 1984 to 1993, Grant Fox was one of New Zealand's greatest point-scorers with 1067 points, including 645 test points. Fox played 46 tests, including the 1987 World Cup final against France. Known as The Iceman, Michael Jones was one of the greatest open side flankers of all time. Born in Auckland, New Zealand, Jones first played international rugby for Samoa, then for New Zealand, playing 55 tests between 1987 and 1998. Due to his Christian faith, Jones never played rugby on Sundays, resulting in him not playing in the 1991 World Cup semi-final against Australia, and also in him not being picked for the 1995 World Cup squad.

For many years the most capped test All Black was Sean Fitzpatrick, with 92 appearances. He played in the 1987 World Cup after incumbent Andy Dalton was injured, and was appointed All Blacks captain in 1992, continuing in the role until his retirement in 1997. He played 346 first class rugby matches.

Jonah Lomu is generally regarded as the first true global superstar of rugby union. He was the youngest player ever to appear in a test as an All Black, making his debut at age 19 years, 45 days in 1994. Lomu, a wing, had unique physical gifts; even though he stood 1.96 metres (6 feet 5 inches) and weighed 119 kg (262 lb), making him both the tallest and heaviest back ever to play for New Zealand, he could run 100 metres in under 11 seconds. He burst on the international scene in the 1995 Rugby World Cup, scoring seven tries in the competition. Four of those tries came in New Zealand's semi-final win over England, including an iconic try in which he bulldozed England's Mike Catt on his way to the try line. He added eight more tries in the 1999 Rugby World Cup. Perhaps most remarkably, Lomu played virtually his entire top-level career in the shadow of a serious kidney disorder which ended his test career in 2002 and ultimately led to a transplant in 2004. Even with his career hampered and eventually shortened by his health issues, he scored 37 tries in 63 tests.

=== Player records ===
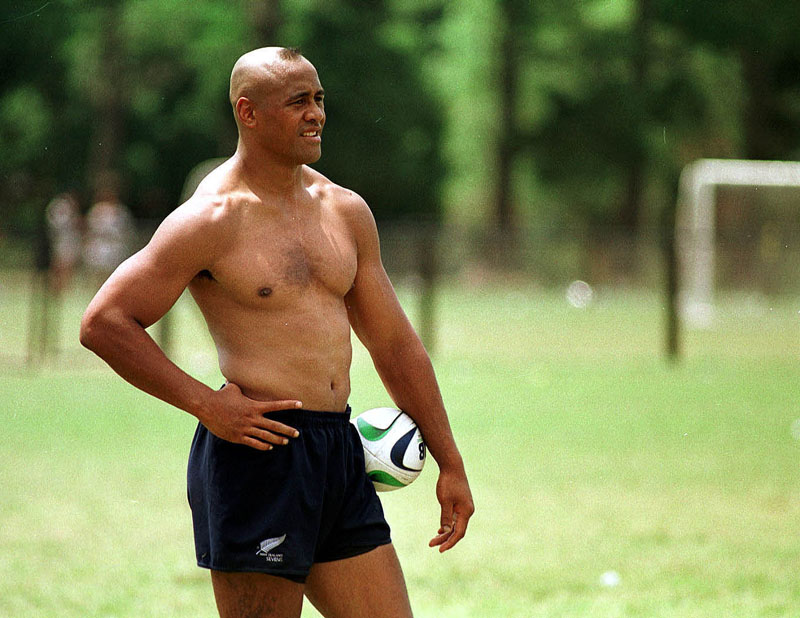
Jonah Lomu debuted with New Zealand at 19 years old. He is generally regarded as the first true global superstar of rugby union

The record for most test points for not only New Zealand, but any nation, is held by Dan Carter with 1,598 from 112 tests. He surpassed Andrew Mehrtens' All Black record total of 967 points from 70 tests in the All Blacks' win over England on 21 November 2009. On 27 November 2010 Dan Carter scored a penalty against Wales to pass Jonny Wilkinson's previous world record of 1,178 points. Carter also holds the record for points against Australia with 366.

The All Blacks' leading test try scorer is Will Jordan, who overtook previous record holder Doug Howlett in 2026. The world record for tries in a calendar year is held by Joe Rokocoko, with 17 tries in 2003; he also became the first All Black to score ten tries in his first five tests, as well as the first All Black to score at least two tries in each of four consecutive tests. In test matches, the most capped All Black is Sam Whitelock with 153 caps. The record for most tests as captain is held by Richie McCaw with 110. The youngest All Black in a test match was Jonah Lomu, capped at age 19 years, 45 days, whilst the oldest test player was Ned Hughes at 40 years, 123 days. (Note: The next oldest test player was Frank Bunce, aged 35 years, 305 days; over four years younger than Hughes.)

=== Award winners ===
The following New Zealand players have been recognised at the World Rugby Awards since 2001:

World Rugby Player of the Year (2001–12)
Year	Nominees	Winners
2002	Richie McCaw	—
2003	Richie McCaw (2)	—
2005	Dan Carter	Dan Carter
2005	Richie McCaw (3)	Dan Carter
2005	Tana Umaga	Dan Carter
2006	Dan Carter (2)	Richie McCaw
2006	Richie McCaw (4)	Richie McCaw
2007	Richie McCaw (5)	—
2008	Dan Carter (3)	—
2009	Richie McCaw (6)	Richie McCaw (2)
2010	Richie McCaw (7)	Richie McCaw (3)
2010	Mils Muliaina	Richie McCaw (3)
2011	Jerome Kaino	—
2011	Ma'a Nonu	—
2011	Piri Weepu	—
2012	Dan Carter (4)	Dan Carter (2)
2012	Richie McCaw (8)	Dan Carter (2)

World Rugby Player of the Year (2013–23)
Year	Nominees	Winners
2013	Kieran Read	Kieran Read
2013	Ben Smith	Kieran Read
2014	Brodie Retallick	Brodie Retallick
2014	Julian Savea	Brodie Retallick
2015	Dan Carter (5)	Dan Carter (3)
2015	Julian Savea (2)	Dan Carter (3)
2016	Beauden Barrett	Beauden Barrett
2016	Dane Coles	Beauden Barrett
2017	Beauden Barrett (2)	Beauden Barrett (2)
2017	Rieko Ioane	Beauden Barrett (2)
2018	Beauden Barrett (3)	—
2018	Rieko Ioane (2)	—
2019	Ardie Savea	—
2023	Ardie Savea (2)	Ardie Savea

World Rugby Breakthrough Player of the Year
Year	Nominees	Winners
2015	Nehe Milner-Skudder	Nehe Milner-Skudder
2016	Anton Lienert-Brown	—
2016	Ardie Savea	—
2017	Rieko Ioane	Rieko Ioane
2018	Karl Tu'inukuafe	—
2021	Will Jordan	Will Jordan
2023	Mark Tele'a	Mark Tele'a
2023	Tamaiti Williams	Mark Tele'a
2024	Wallace Sititi	Wallace Sititi
2025	Fabian Holland	Fabian Holland

World Rugby Dream Team of the Year
Year	No.	Players
2021	8.	Ardie Savea
2021	10.	Beauden Barrett
2021	14.	Will Jordan
2022	5.	Sam Whitelock
2022	14.	Will Jordan (2)
2023	5.	Scott Barrett
2023	8.	Ardie Savea (2)
2023	10.	Richie Mo'unga
2023	11.	Will Jordan (3)
2024	3.	Tyrel Lomax
2024	10.	Damian McKenzie
2024	15.	Will Jordan (4)
2025	9.	Cam Roigard
2025	15.	Will Jordan (5)

World Rugby Try of the Year
Year	Date	Scorer	Match	Tournament
2013	15 June	Beauden Barrett	vs. France	Summer Test Series
2015	17 October	Julian Savea	vs. France	Rugby World Cup
2018	18 August	Brodie Retallick	vs. Australia	Rugby Championship
2019	6 October	TJ Perenara	vs. Namibia	Rugby World Cup

== Coaches ==
The following table lists every head coach of the All Blacks, from 1949 to the present day. Every All Black head coach has been a New Zealander. Dave Rennie is currently New Zealand's head coach.

Name	Years	Tests	Won	Lost	Draw	Win %	All Black No.
Alex McDonald	1949	4	0	4	0	0%	128
Tom Morrison	1950, 55–56	12	8	3	1	66.7%	441
Len Clode	1951	3	3	0	0	100%	-
Arthur Marslin	1953–1954	5	3	2	0	60%	-
Dick Everest	1957	2	2	0	0	100%	-
Jack Sullivan	1958–1960	11	6	4	1	54.5%	428
Neil McPhail	1961–1965	20	16	2	2	80%	-
Ron Bush	1962	2	2	0	0	100%	-
Fred Allen	1966–1968	14	14	0	0	100%	449
Ivan Vodanovich	1969–1971	10	4	5	1	40%	568
Bob Duff	1972–1973	8	6	1	1	75%	523
JJ Stewart	1974–1976	11	6	4	1	54.5%	-
Jack Gleeson	1977–1978	13	10	3	0	76.9%	-
Eric Watson	1979–1980	9	5	4	0	55.6%	-
Peter Burke	1981–1982	11	9	2	0	81.8%	534
Bryce Rope	1983–1984	12	9	2	1	75%	-
Brian Lochore	1985–1987	18	14	3	1	77.8%	637
Alex Wyllie	1988–1991	29	25	3	1	86.2%	688
Laurie Mains	1992–1995	34	23	10	1	67.6%	697
John Hart	1996–1999	41	31	9	1	75.6%	-
Wayne Smith	2000–2001	17	12	5	0	70.6%	806
John Mitchell	2002–2003	28	23	4	1	82.1%	940
Graham Henry	2004–2011	103	88	15	0	85.4%	-
Steve Hansen	2012–2019	107	93	10	4	86.9%	-
Ian Foster	2020–2023	46	32	12	2	69.6%	-
Scott Robertson	2024–2025	27	20	7	0	74.1%	974
Dave Rennie	2026–present	12	7	5	0	58.3%	-

=== Award winners ===
The following All Blacks head coaches have been recognised at the World Rugby Awards since 2001:

World Rugby Coach of the Year
Year	Nominees	Winners
2005	Graham Henry	Graham Henry
2006	Graham Henry (2)	Graham Henry (2)
2008	Graham Henry (3)	Graham Henry (3)
2010	Graham Henry (4)	Graham Henry (4)
2011	Graham Henry (5)	Graham Henry (5)
2012	Steve Hansen	Steve Hansen
2013	Steve Hansen (2)	Steve Hansen (2)
2014	Steve Hansen (3)	Steve Hansen (3)
2015	Steve Hansen (4)	—
2016	Steve Hansen (5)	Steve Hansen (4)
2017	Steve Hansen (6)	—
2018	Steve Hansen (7)	—
2019	Steve Hansen (8)	—
2021	Ian Foster	—
2023	Ian Foster (2)	—

=== Current coaching staff ===
Position	Name
Head coach	Dave Rennie
Senior assistant coach	Neil Barnes
Forwards coach	Jason Ryan
Defence coach	Tana Umaga
Attack coach	Mike Blair
Head of performance	Phil Healey

== Home grounds ==
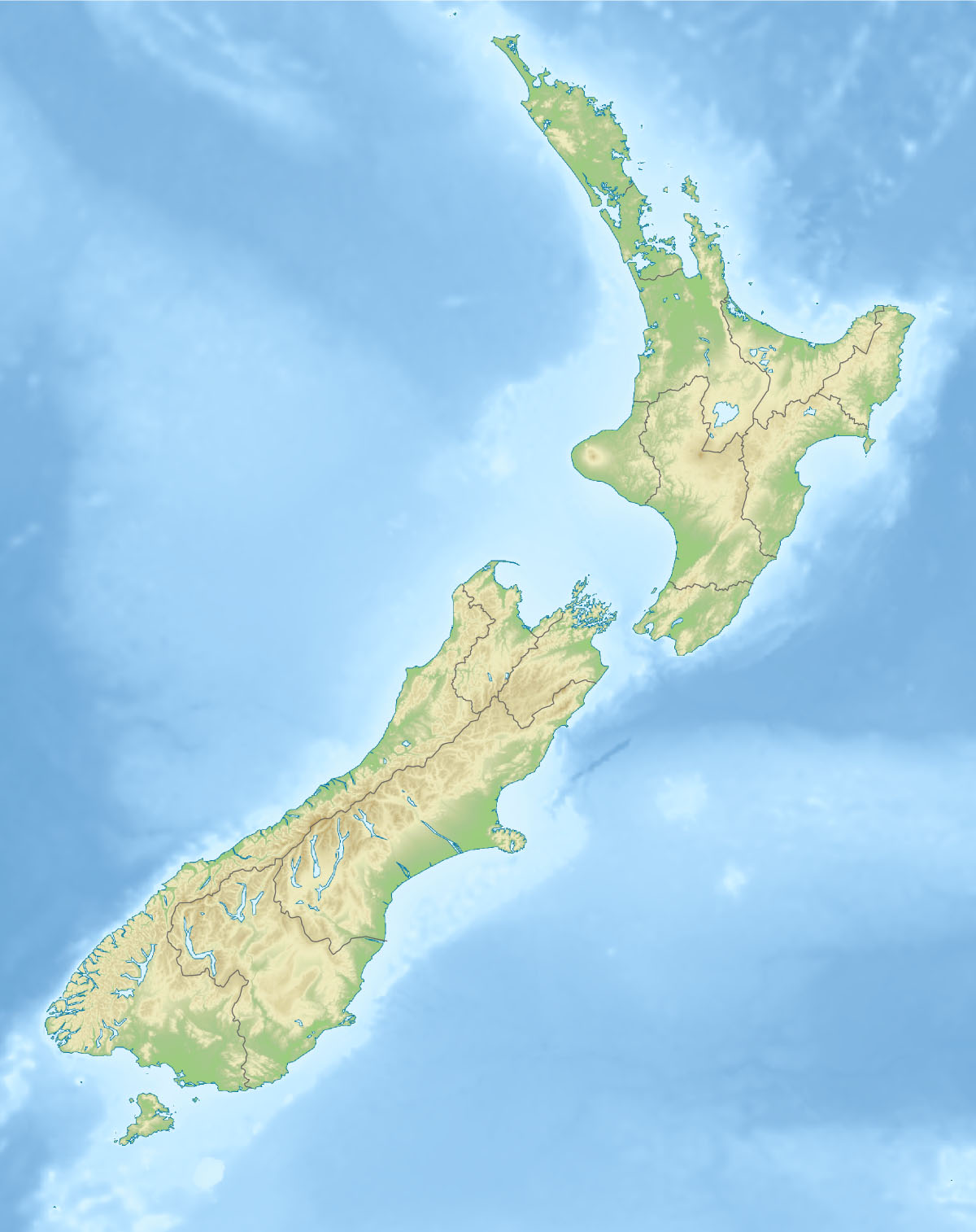
Map showing locations of current home grounds in New Zealand

Like other major rugby nations Argentina, Australia, France and South Africa, New Zealand does not have an official stadium for its national team. Instead, the All Blacks play their test matches at a variety of venues throughout New Zealand.

Prior to the construction of Westpac Stadium in 1999, Wellington's test venue was Athletic Park, which had served as the venue for the first All Blacks test match in New Zealand against Great Britain in 1904. The first home test match played outside the main centres of Auckland, Christchurch, Dunedin or Wellington was in 1996 at McLean Park in Napier.

Originally known as Rugby Park, the Hamilton venue was completely reconstructed in late 2000 to upgrade the facility, re-opening in early 2002 as Waikato Stadium.

Eden Park and Lancaster Park were upgraded in preparation for the 2011 Rugby World Cup. By that time, the NZRU no longer considered Carisbrook a suitable test venue, and a covered sports stadium (Forsyth Barr) was proposed as a replacement. Dunedin City Council approved the new stadium in March 2008, land acquisition proceeded from August to October of that year.

Ground	First Test	Last Test	Tests Held	Win%	Last Loss
Athletic Park, Wellington, North Island	1904 v British Lions	1999 v France	42	69%	25 July 1998
Tahuna Park, Dunedin, South Island	1905 v Australia	(1905)	1	100%	N/A
Potter's Park, Auckland, North Island	1908 v British Lions	(1908)	1	100%	N/A
Carisbrook, Dunedin, South Island	1908 v British Lions	2011 v Fiji	38	86%	13 June 2009
Lancaster Park, Christchurch, South Island	1913 v Australia	2010 v Australia	48	81%	1 August 1998
Christchurch Stadium, Christchurch, South Island	2012 v Ireland	2022 v Argentina	5	80%	27 August 2022
Te Kaha Stadium, Christchurch, South Island	2026 v France	2026 v France	1	100%	N/A
Eden Park, Auckland, North Island	1921 v South Africa	2026 v Australia	97	86%	3 July 1994
Epsom Showgrounds, Auckland, North Island	1958 v Australia	(1958)	1	100%	N/A
Forsyth Barr Stadium, Dunedin, South Island	2012 v South Africa	2025 v France	11	90%	9 July 2022
McLean Park, Napier, North Island	1996 v Western Samoa	2014 v Argentina	2	100%	N/A
Mt Smart Stadium, Auckland, North Island	2021 v Tonga	2023 v South Africa	2	100%	N/A
North Harbour Stadium, Auckland, North Island	1997 v Fiji	2017 v South Africa	7	100%	N/A
Hnry Stadium, Wellington, North Island	2000 v Australia	2026 v Italy	32	72%	13 September 2025
Waikato Stadium, Hamilton, North Island (Note: Includes one test match as Rugby Park, prior to its reconstruction in 2000 as Waikato Stadium)	1997 v Argentina	2025 v France	17	94%	12 October 2009
Taranaki Stadium, New Plymouth, North Island	2008 v Samoa	2017 v Argentina	4	100%	N/A
Trafalgar Park, Nelson, South Island	2018 v Argentina	(2018)	1	100%	N/A
Total			310	84%	

== See also ==
- New Zealand women's national rugby union team
- 1888–89 New Zealand Native football team
- Junior All Blacks
- List of New Zealand rugby union test matches
- All Blacks XV
- Māori All Blacks
- New Zealand Heartland XV
- New Zealand national team nomenclature based on the "All Blacks"
- Racism in New Zealand rugby union
- Ka Mate haka
- Kapa o Pango haka

== Works cited ==
- Fagan, Sean (2013). The First Lions of Rugby. Richmond, Australia: Slattery Media Group. ISBN 9780987500274.
- Gifford, Phil (2004). The Passion: The Stories Behind 125 Years of Canterbury Rugby. Wilson Scott Publishing. ISBN 978-0-9582535-1-2.
- Harding, Grant; Williams, David (2000). The Toughest of Them All: New Zealand and South Africa: The Struggle for Rugby Supremacy. Auckland, New Zealand: Penguin Books. ISBN 978-0-14-029577-1.
- Howell, Max (2005). Born to Lead: Wallaby test Captains. North Harbour, New Zealand: Celebrity Books. ISBN 978-1-877252-18-1.
- Howitt, Bob (2005). SANZAR Saga: Ten Years of Super 12 and Tri-Nations Rugby. Harper Collins Publishers. ISBN 978-1-86950-566-0.
- McCarthy, Winston (1968). Haka! The All Blacks Story. London: Pelham Books.
- McLean, Terry (1959). Great Days in New Zealand Rugby. Wellington, New Zealand: A. H. & A. W. Reed.
- McLean, Terry (1987). New Zealand Rugby Legends. Auckland, New Zealand: MOA Publications. ISBN 978-0-908570-15-7.
- Mulholland, Malcolm (2009). Beneath the Māori Moon: An Illustrated History of Māori Rugby. Huia Publishers. ISBN 978-1-86969-305-3.
- Palenski, Ron (2003). Century in Black: 100 Years of All Black test Rugby. Hodder Moa Beckett Publishers Limited. ISBN 978-1-86958-937-0.
- Peatey, Lance (2011). In Pursuit of Bill: A Complete History of the Rugby World Cup. New Holland Publishers. ISBN 9781742571911.
- Ryan, Greg (1993). Forerunners of the All Blacks. Christchurch, New Zealand: Canterbury University Press. ISBN 978-0-908812-30-1.
- Ryan, Greg (2011). "A Tale of Two Dinners: New Zealand Rugby and the Embrace of Empire, 1919–32". The International Journal of the History of Sport. 28 (10): 1409–25. doi:10.1080/09523367.2011.577641. S2CID 144270919.
- Slatter, Gordan (1974). Great Days at Lancaster Park. Christchurch, New Zealand: Whitcombe and Tombs. ISBN 978-0-7233-0389-3.
- Verdon, Paul (2000). Born to Lead – The Untold Story of the All Black test Captains. Auckland, New Zealand: Celebrity Books. ISBN 978-1-877252-05-1.
- Vincent, G. T. (1998). "Practical Imperialism: The Anglo-Welsh Rugby Tour of New Zealand, 1908". The International Journal of the History of Sport. 15 (1): 123–40. doi:10.1080/09523369808714015.

Awards
Preceded by Richard Hadlee	Halberg Awards – Supreme Award; 1987; 2011; 2015	Succeeded by Mark Todd
Preceded by All Whites	Halberg Awards – Supreme Award; 1987; 2011; 2015	Succeeded by Hamish Bond & Eric Murray
Preceded by Hamish Bond & Eric Murray	Halberg Awards – Supreme Award; 1987; 2011; 2015	Succeeded by Lisa Carrington
New award	Halberg Awards – New Zealand Team of the Year; 1987; 1996; 1997; 2006; 2011; 2013; 2015	Succeeded by Paul MacDonald & Ian Ferguson
Preceded by Team New Zealand	Halberg Awards – New Zealand Team of the Year; 1987; 1996; 1997; 2006; 2011; 2013; 2015	Succeeded by All Blacks
Preceded by All Blacks	Halberg Awards – New Zealand Team of the Year; 1987; 1996; 1997; 2006; 2011; 2013; 2015	Succeeded by Equestrian Eventing Team
Preceded by Nathan Twaddle & George Bridgewater	Halberg Awards – New Zealand Team of the Year; 1987; 1996; 1997; 2006; 2011; 2013; 2015	Succeeded by Men's Coxless Four
Preceded by All Whites	Halberg Awards – New Zealand Team of the Year; 1987; 1996; 1997; 2006; 2011; 2013; 2015	Succeeded by Hamish Bond & Eric Murray
Preceded by Hamish Bond & Eric Murray	Halberg Awards – New Zealand Team of the Year; 1987; 1996; 1997; 2006; 2011; 2013; 2015	Succeeded by Hamish Bond & Eric Murray
Preceded by Hamish Bond & Eric Murray	Halberg Awards – New Zealand Team of the Year; 1987; 1996; 1997; 2006; 2011; 2013; 2015	Succeeded by Peter Burling & Blair Tuke
