= 1960 New Zealand rugby union tour of Australia and South Africa =

Summary
| P | W | D | L |
Total
| 31 | 25 | 2 | 4 |
Test match
| 5 | 2 | 1 | 2 |
Opponent
| P | W | D | L |
South Africa
| 4 | 1 | 1 | 2 |
Rhodesia
| 1 | 1 | 0 | 0 |

The 1960 New Zealand rugby union tour of South Africa, was a series of rugby union matches played by the New Zealand national rugby union team (the All Blacks) in South Africa and Rhodesia.

== Results ==
The results of the tour were disappointing for the All Blacks, of whom much was expected after their victory in the 1956 home series. They lost the 4 test series 2 - 1, with one match drawn.

The New Zealand Rugby Football Union (NZRFU) complied with South Africa's apartheid-era, all-white policy by excluding Māori players, despite widespread protest, including a 150,000-signature petition against it. The "No Maoris, No Tour" campaign was the first major anti-tour movement, featuring protests at airports as the team departed.

== Later tours ==
The Springboks subsequently toured New Zealand in 1965, playing teams containing Māori players. However, a proposed 1967 tour to South Africa was cancelled by the New Zealand government, because Māori players were still excluded by South African authorities. Instead an All Black tour to Europe was hastily arranged to take its place.

=== In Australia ===
No tests were played

Scores and results list All Blacks' points tally first.

| Opposing Team | For | Against | Date | Venue | Status |
|---|---|---|---|---|---|
| New South Wales | 27 | 0 | 14 May 1960 | Moore Park, Sydney | Tour match |
| Queensland | 32 | 3 | 14 May 1960 | Moore Park, Sydney | Tour match |
| Victoria-South Australia | 30 | 6 | 17 May 1960 | Wade Park, Orange | Tour match |
| New South Wales Country | 38 | 6 | 17 May 1960 | Wade Park, Orange | Tour match |
| Western Australia | 57 | 0 | 21 May 1960 | Leederville Oval, Perth | Tour match |

=== In Africa ===
Scores and results list All Blacks' points tally first.

| Opposing Team | For | Against | Date | Venue | Status |
|---|---|---|---|---|---|
| Northern Universities | 45 | 6 | 28 May 1960 | Olen Park, Potchefstroom | Tour match |
| Natal | 6 | 6 | 31 May 1960 | Kings Park, Durban | Tour match |
| Griqualand West | 21 | 9 | 4 June 1960 | De Beers Stadium, Kimberley | Tour match |
| SW Africa | 27 | 3 | 8 June 1960 | South West Stadium, Windhoek | Tour match |
| Boland | 16 | 0 | 11 June 1960 | Boland Stadium, Wellington | Tour match |
| West. Prov. Universities | 14 | 3 | 15 June 1960 | Newlands, Cape Town | Tour match |
| Northern Transvaal | 27 | 3 | 18 June 1960 | Loftus Versfeld, Pretoria | Tour match |
| South Africa | 0 | 13 | 25 June 1960 | Ellis Park, Johannesburg | Test match |
| A Rhodesian XV | 13 | 9 | 29 June 1960 | Kitwe | Tour match |
| Rhodesia | 29 | 14 | 2 July 1960 | Slamis Stadium, Salisbury | Test match |
| Orange Free State | 8 | 9 | 6 July 1960 | Free State Stadium, Bloemfontein | Tour match |
| Junior Springboks | 20 | 6 | 9 July 1960 | Kings Park, Durban | Tour match |
| Eastern Province | 16 | 3 | 13 July 1960 | Boet Erasmus, Port Elizabeth | Tour match |
| Western Province | 20 | 8 | 16 July 1960 | Newlands, Cape Town | Tour match |
| SW District | 18 | 6 | 19 July 1960 | Oudtshoorn | Tour match |
| South Africa | 11 | 3 | 23 July 1960 | Newlands, Cape Town | Test match |
| Central Universities | 21 | 12 | 27 July 1960 | Border RU Ground, East London | Tour match |
| Eastern Transvaal | 11 | 6 | 30 July 1960 | PAM Brink, Springs | Tour match |
| SA Combined Services | 3 | 8 | 3 August 1960 | Loftus Versfeld, Pretoria | Tour match |
| Transvaal | 19 | 3 | 6 August 1960 | Ellis Park, Johannesburg | Tour match |
| Western Transvaal | 28 | 3 | 9 August 1960 | Olen Park, Potchefstroom | Tour match |
| South Africa | 11 | 11 | 13 August 1960 | Free State Stadium, Bloemfontein | Test match |
| North-Eastern Districts | 15 | 6 | 17 August 1960 | Aliwal North | Tour match |
| Border | 30 | 3 | 20 August 1960 | Border RU Ground, East London | Tour match |
| South Africa | 3 | 8 | 27 August 1960 | Boet Erasmus, Port Elizabeth | Test match |
| A Transvaal XV | 9 | 3 | 3 September 1960 | Ellis Park, Johannesburg | Tour match |

== Cultural reaction ==
The Howard Morrison Quartet released "My Old Man's an All-Black", a parody of My Old Man's a Dustman, which noted the absence of Māori players from the touring side:

Oh, my old man’s an All Black,
He wears the silver fern,
But his mates just couldn’t take him
So he’s out now for a turn.
Fi Fi Fo Fum, there’s no Horis in this scrum.

American satirist Tom Lehrer was touring New Zealand in April 1960 when Prime Minister Walter Nash officially refused to intervene in the New Zealand Rugby Football Union's plans to tour South Africa with only white players. On introducing his own song "Fight Fiercely, Harvard" in the Auckland Town Hall, he said "At this juncture of the evening's symposium, I wish to pay tribute to the New Zealand Rugby Football Union--for not allowing a little thing like human dignity to interfere with the great principles of the game." He would go on to pen original lyrics on the subject, which were published in the Auckland Star:

When the early missionaries first brought Rugby to New Zealand,
It became the state religion right away,
And to the ten commandments has been added an eleventh,
And it says: No matter what -- thou shalt play!

CHORUS:
Oh, Mr Nash, why so rash?
Is the Rugby Union so hard up for cash?
Though you talk about the Maori
In your phrases sweet and flow'ry
I'm afraid you've missed the point, Mr Nash.

When the team goes to South Africa, we all must act politely,
So to all their local problems, let's be mute.
It might be a friendly gesture as a token of affection
If we brought along some blacks for them to shoot.

CHORUS: Oh, Mr Nash, etc.

No, it doesn't really matter what New Zealand may have lost,
As long as Kiwi Rugby players are supreme,
And just think how glad they'd make us if they came back with the title
Of the World's Greatest Non-Pigmented Team!

CHORUS: Oh, Mr Nash, etc.
