= Rugby union in the Australian Capital Territory =

- Governing body: ACT and Southern NSW Rugby Union
- Professional team: Brumbies
- First played: c. 1907
- Registered players: 2,592 (2019)

Club competitions
- Super Rugby; ACTRU Premier Division

Rugby union is a popular sport in the Australian Capital Territory. The game was established in the area around what is now Canberra more than a century ago.

== History ==
Rugby football was played in the region around what is now known the Australian Capital Territory well before it separated from New South Wales on 1 January 1911.

The Goulburn Rugby Union Club was formed in 1872 and became a founding member of the Southern Rugby Union (now NSWRU) in 1874. Teams from Cooma and Snowy River played as early as 1876, and teams from Queanbeyan and Yass were playing by 1878.

The first match of the 1899 British Lions tour was held at the Goulburn Showgrounds, and the Central Southern RFU put up a strong showing before the visitors prevailed 11–3. Central Southern beat the reigning Sydney premiers Glebe the following year.

In 1913 Frederick Campbell, who was involved in the formative years of rugby union in Australia with the Wallaroo Football Club and Sydney University Football Club in the late 1860s and early 1870s, sold his country estate ‘Yarralumla’ to the Commonwealth government and is today’s Government House (residence of the Governor-General), Canberra. The Campbell family’s historic ‘Duntroon Estate’ is now the suburb of Campbell and the Royal Military College, Duntroon.

=== Beginnings ===
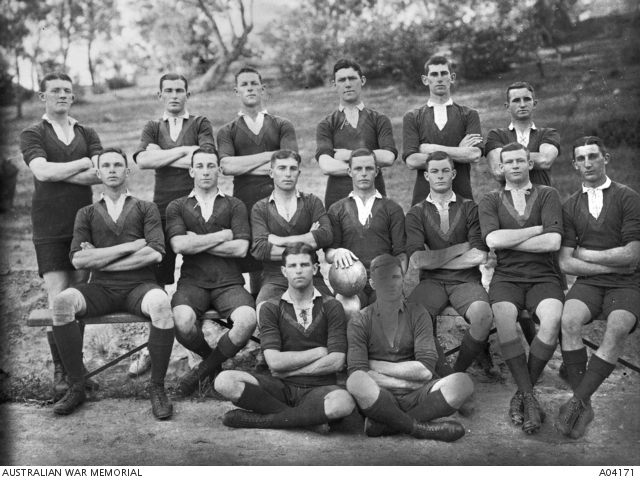
First Fifteen of Royal Military College in 1913.

A team from Hall was playing rugby by 1907. Royal Military College, Duntroon played the game from the year it was founded in 1911. The Federal City Club also played rugby union prior to the First World War, including matches against a Glenlee team from Bungendore and the Rovers and Warrigal clubs from Queanbeyan.

The dominant rugby code in the region after the first world war was rugby league. Although Royal Military College remained with rugby union, matches had to be arranged with Sydney teams for the college to play the game. A Federal Capital Territory (FCT) branch of the NSW Rugby Union was founded in 1927, but there was not sufficient support for the union code to warrant the establishment of a formal competition. Royal Military College played a series of matches that year against the newly-formed Canberra Rugby Union Club instead. The Canberra club had adopted a black and white strip.

The FCT Rugby Union had to be re-established in 1930, and re-established again in 1937. It was renamed the Australian Capital Territory Rugby Union in 1939. No rugby union matches were played in Canberra for the five years prior to 1936, in the period when the Royal Military College was forced to relocate to the Victoria Barracks, Sydney due to the economic downturn caused by the Great Depression. After returning to Duntroon, the Military College played a re-formed Canberra Rugby Club in 1937, ten years after the teams had first met.

The First Grade competition was started in 1938 with four clubs playing in the inaugural season. The Territory's representative team hosted the All Blacks at Manuka Oval in 1938, with the New Zealanders winning by 57–5.

=== Growth of amateur rugby: 1946 to 1995 ===
Rugby union expanded quickly after World War II, particularly in New South Wales. The Australian Capital Territory team grew in stature through the 1950s and 1960s as part of the NSW Country Rugby Union. ACT won the Caldwell Cup for the Country Championship for the first time in 1964 and went on to win it three times in a row. In 1966, five Canberra players were chosen in the squad for the Combined NSW Country team that gave the touring British Lions team a physical match, losing narrowly by 6–3 in front of a record crowd at Manuka Oval.

The 1970s was a breakthrough decade. The ACT claimed their first win over an international side, defeating Tonga by 17–6 in 1973. ACT Rugby Union separated from NSW Country after the 1974 season and became directly affiliated to the Australian Rugby Football Union. In 1975 the ACT team won promotion to top division of the Wallaby Trophy, Australia's provincial championship at the time. The triumph was cut short, however, as the tournament was cancelled in that season. In 1978, the ACT defeated the reigning Five Nations champions Wales at Manuka Oval, showing that they could compete with some of the world's best players.

After the ACT team had comprehensively beaten New South Wales in 1994, an invitation was issued for a Canberra club to play in the NSWRU Premiership for the following season. The ACT Rugby Union formed the Canberra Kookaburra Rugby Club in August 1994, with the Tuggeranong Vikings RUC as underwriters.

=== Professional era ===
Brumbies colours

== Brumbies ==
The Brumbies are the Australian Capital Territory's professional rugby union team and have competed in the transnational Super Rugby competition since the start of the professional era of rugby in 1996.

== Competitions ==
=== Super Rugby ===
The Brumbies play in the Super Rugby competition against other professional teams from Australia, New Zealand, South Africa, and now also Argentina and Japan. The Brumbies have won the Super Rugby competition twice (2001 and 2004), and finished as runner-up four times (1997, 2000, 2002, 2013).

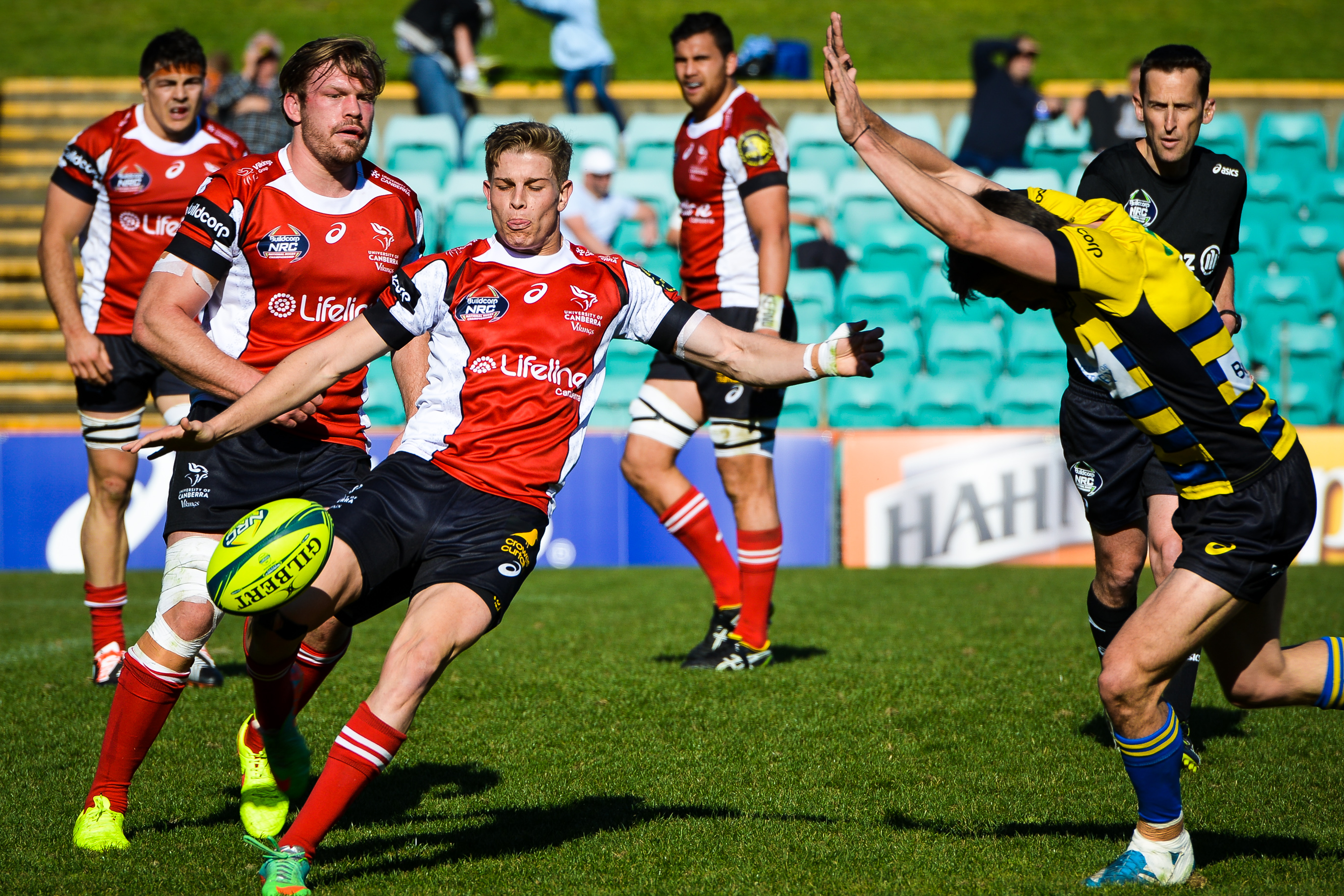
2014 NRC: Michael Dowsett, playing for the Vikings, kicks ahead against the Sydney Stars.

=== National Rugby Championship ===
The ACT had one team in the National Rugby Championship (NRC), before the competition was stopped:

- Canberra Vikings

=== ACTRU Premier Division ===
The Premier Division is contested in and around Canberra across four senior grades and three colts competitions. Club Championship trophies are also contested on overall results. The John I Dent Cup is the trophy for the first grade premiership competition, and the seven clubs currently competing for the premiership are:

- Canberra Royals
- Eastern Suburbs
- Gungahlin Eagles
- Queanbeyan Whites
- Tuggeranong Vikings
- Uni-Norths Owls
- Wests Lions

The John I Dent Cup, which was first played for in 1938, was a gift to the union by the pastoralist John I Dent. The competition finals are now held at Viking Park.
