= Sport in the Australian Capital Territory =

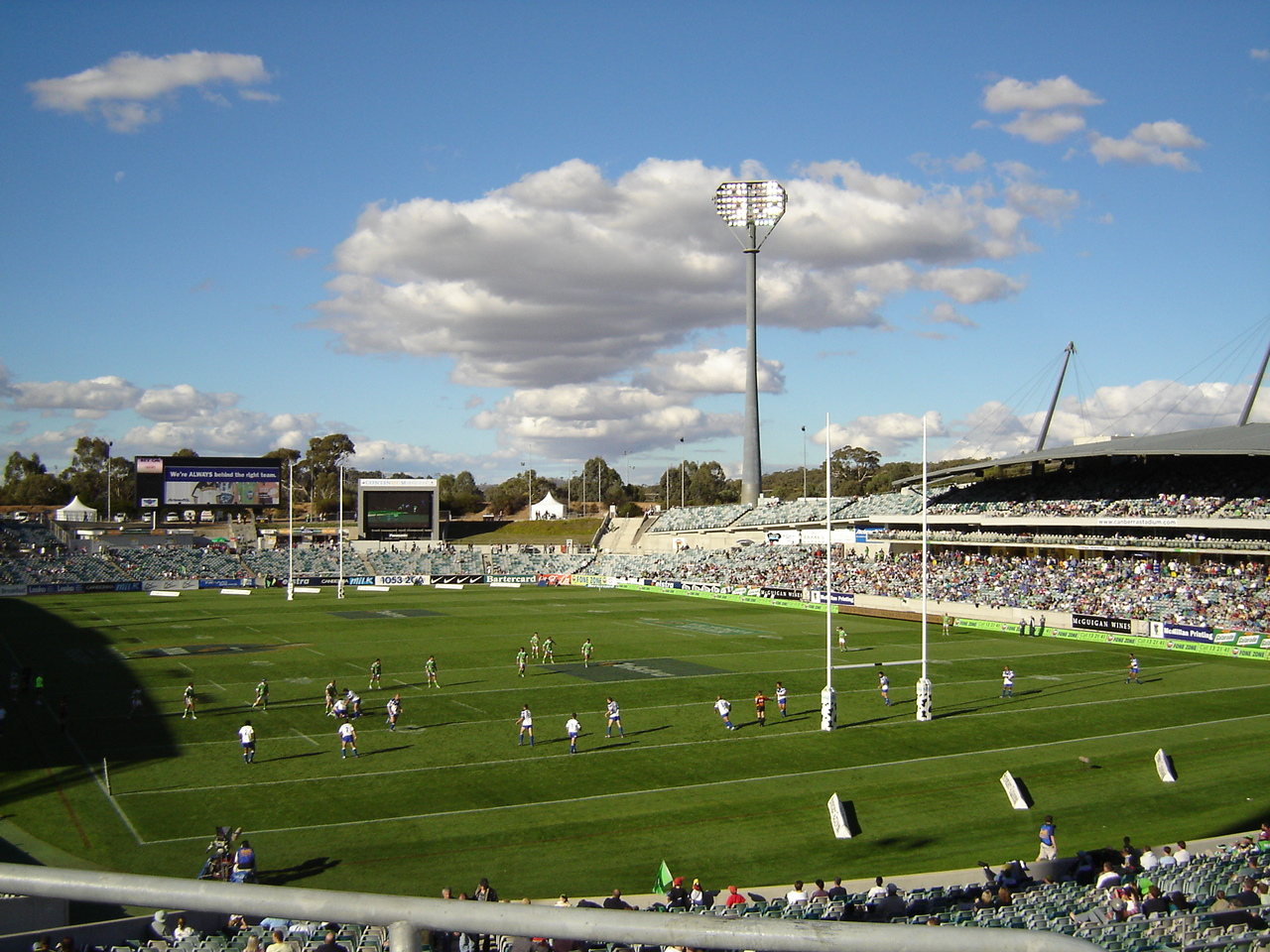
Canberra Raiders at Bruce Stadium

Sport in the Australian Capital Territory refers to the various sports played in the Australian Capital Territory. Teams represent the ACT in the national leagues of several sports, although the rugby league and rugby union teams receive far more local coverage than any of the other teams and are considered the main sports of the territory. The Australian Institute of Sport was set up in 1981, where many Olympic and other athletes are trained.

== Rugby Union ==
Rugby Union is a popular sport in the ACT with Canberra boasting a professional team, the ACT Brumbies.

The Brumbies, founded in 1996 and based at Canberra Stadium, are the local Super Rugby team. They are Australia's most successful Super Rugby franchise having won the competition three times, and reaching the playoffs on several occasions. The Brumbies hold the current crowd record at Canberra Stadium of 28,753 for the grand final match on 22 May 2004 against the Crusaders which the Brumbies won 47–38.

Result	Years
Champions	2001, 2004, 2020
Runners-up	1997, 2000, 2002, 2013
Losing Semi-finalist	2003, 2014, 2015, 2019

Rugby Union is played by several clubs at all levels and numerous schools at junior levels. The John Dent Cup is the premier local Rugby Union tournament while the ACTJRU is the local Rugby Union tournament for juniors. Both tournaments and other senior grades are administered by the ACT and Southern NSW Rugby Union, the local governing body for Rugby Union.

Professional Clubs	Other Rugby Clubs	Major Rugby Schools
Brumbies	Canberra Royals	St Edmund's College
Canberra Vikings	Eastern Suburbs	Marist College
	Gungahlin Eagles	Canberra Grammar School
	Queanbeyan Whites	Radford College
	Tuggeranong Vikings	Daramalan College
	Uni-Norths Owls	Royal Military College
	Wests Lions	Australian Defence Force Academy
	Hall Bushrangers	

== Soccer ==
The Canberra Cosmos represented Canberra between 1995 and 2001 in the National Soccer League. There are official plans to have a team in the A-League Men at the moment. Canberra United FC competes in the A-League Women (formerly known as the W-League), and have won a championship (2011–12) and two premierships (2011–12 and 2013–14). As an addition to the 2009 sporting calendar an international Asian Cup qualifier was scheduled between Australia and Kuwait at Canberra Stadium. It is the first international football game in Canberra in many years.

== Rugby League ==
Rugby League is one of the main sports in the A.C.T in terms of attendances and media coverage. The Canberra Raiders are Canberra's National Rugby League team and play the most matches in the capital out of any single sport, having been admitted to the competition in 1982. They are Canberra's most successful sports team and have won the premiership on three occasions - in 1989, 1990 and 1994. The team's current home ground is Canberra Stadium.

At a local level teams play for the Canberra Raiders Cup, covering the sports program of tens of thousands of local juniors. Players developed through the system are then eligible to play for the Country Origin team and the New South Wales Blues at representative level.

== Australian Rules ==
Australian Football League clubs have played matches at Manuka Oval since 2001 although there is still no official Canberra-based AFL team. From 2012 onwards the new Greater Western Sydney Giants AFL team has played three regular season matches a year and one pre-season match in Canberra at Manuka Oval. There is the local AFL Canberra competition and the former North East Australian Football League (NEAFL) competition in which both the Sydney Swans and Greater Western Sydney Giants reserves teams competed against clubs from Canberra, Sydney and South East Queensland. The Barassi International Australian Football Youth Tournament is also held in Canberra.

== Basketball ==
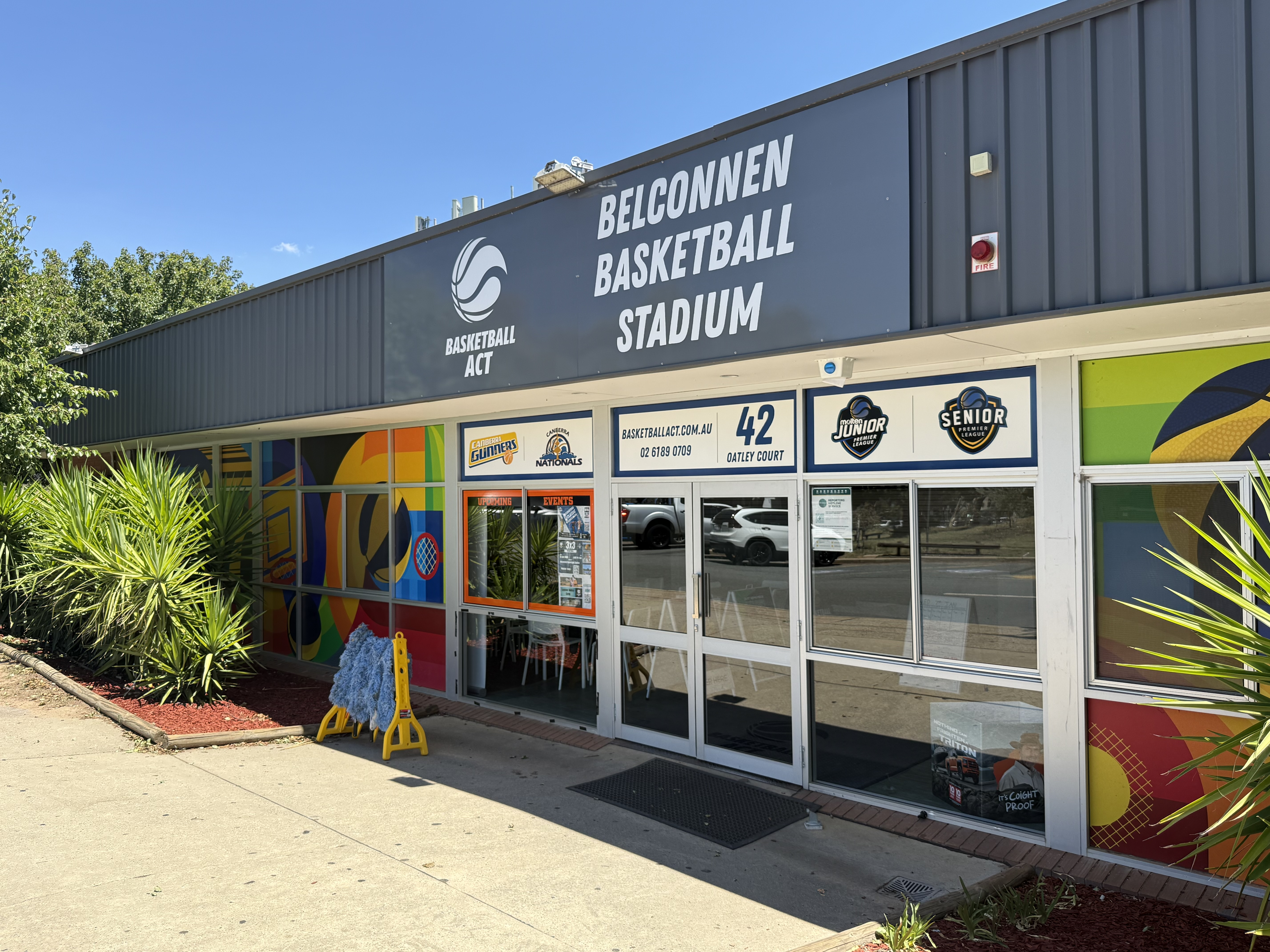
Belconnen Basketball Stadium, home of Basketball ACT, January 2026

The earliest record of basketball in Canberra was March 1942 when the Turner Drill Hall became the venue for physical fitness classes including basketball and for which two moveable backboards were installed. The first recorded game was between Army and YMCA in April 1942 and 6 teams formed a competition in May 1942.

The ACT Men's Amateur Basketball Association was formed on the initiative of Kel McGrath, the first Life member, the then director-general of the Australian Forestry School in the early 1950s with RMC Duntroon, the YMCA and the Australian Forestry School forming the nucleus of the embryo competition. The Ladies International Rules Basketball Association was formed in 1960 with both organisation coming together to form the ACT Amateur Basketball Association in 1961, the predecessor of today's Basketball ACT (BACT) which conducts it operation across some 10 courts with a registered senior & junior, male and female membership exceeding 6,500, it is one of the most integrated sports in the ACT.

At the National Level, Canberra competed in Australian Championships as a State from 1965 until the changing face of the sport led to the development of more favoured club championships, conferences and leagues.

The first interstate league in which Canberra (ACT) participated was the South Eastern Conference formed in 1967 until 1972. Its succession continues as the South East Australian Basketball League (SEABL) in which the premier men's basketball team in Canberra, the Canberra Gunners, currently participate. 1979 saw the creation of the Canberra Cannons was a National Basketball League team, one of the 10 founding clubs it competed between 1979 and 2002 when recurrent financial and management woes finally saw the teams demise, to be later resurrected as the Hunter Pirates and later still as the Singapore Slingers before finally disappearing from sight. Their brief but proud history records their fortunes as League runners-up in 1979 and 1989 and as League Champions three times in 1983, 84 and 88.

The Canberra Capitals are the Canberra-based Women's National Basketball League team. Founded in 1984, they play at the AIS Arena. The Capitals gained entry to the WNBL in 1985, the year in which they won the NSW Club Championship and the Australian Women's Basketball Conference premiership defeating Dandenong 61–59. Ownership of the BACT flagship Canberra Capitals program was transferred under controversial circumstances to the University of Canberra in 2014. BACT retains the Canberra Capitals Academy, its elite female basketball team, which competes in the South East Australian Basketball League (SEABL).

== Motor racing ==
From 2000 to 2002, V8 Supercars raced in Canberra on a temporary street circuit inside the Parliamentary Triangle, the Canberra Street Circuit. The event was held on the Queen's Birthday long weekend each June.

== Sporting venues ==
Bruce	McKellar	Bruce	Manuka	Narrabundah	Wanniassa	Deakin	Phillip	Phillip	Gungahlin
AIS Arena	McKellar Park	Canberra Stadium	Manuka Oval	Narrabundah Ballpark	Viking Park	Deakin Stadium	Phillip Ice Skating Centre	Woden Park	Gungahlin Enclosed Oval
Capacity: 5,200	Capacity: 3,500	Capacity: 25,011	Capacity: 15,000	Capacity: 1,500	Capacity: 8,000	Capacity: 1,500	Capacity: 1,000	Capacity: 1,000	Capacity: 1,150
Basketball	Football	Rugby league, Rugby union	Cricket, Australian rules football	Baseball	Rugby union	Football	Ice hockey	Football, Athletics	Football, Rugby union

== National Competitions ==
Several Canberra sporting teams have won national championships and leagues. These teams include:

Baseball
Canberra Cavalry	2012/13

Basketball
Canberra Capitals (Women)	1999/00, 2001/02, 2002/03, 2005/06; 2006/07, 2008/09, 2009/10;
Canberra Cannons (Men - last season 2002/03)	1983, 1984, 1988

Football
Canberra United (Women)	2011/12, 2013/14, 2014/15, 2016/17

Ice Hockey
CBR Brave	2018, 2022
Canberra Knights	1998

Rugby League
Canberra Raiders	1989, 1990, 1994

Rugby Union
Brumbies	2001, 2004

Softball
John Reid Shield (Men)	1989, 1990, 1993, 1996; 2001, 2003, 2006 2007; 2008, 2009, 2011 2012; 2013
Gilleys Shield (Women)	1978, 1979, 1863

Volleyball
Canberra Heat (Men)	2011, 2015

== Sports Awards ==
ACTSPORT established ACT Sports Star of the Year Awards in 1984. in 2015, these were renamed the Canberra Sport Awards when taken over by ACT Government after ACTSPORT ceased operations. In 1985, ACTSPORT established the ACT Sport Hall of Fame.

== See also ==
- CBR Brave, ice hockey team in the Australian Ice Hockey League.
- Canberra Knights, former ice hockey team in the Australian Ice Hockey League.
- AIS Canberra Darters, netball team that had competed in the Commonwealth Bank Trophy.
- Canberra Lakers (Men) and Canberra Strikers (Women), hockey teams in the Australian Hockey League.
- Canberra Bushrangers, baseball team that had competed in the Australian Baseball League.
- Canberra Cavalry, baseball team in the Australian Baseball League.
- ACT Gridiron, governing body for gridiron in the Australian Capital Territory.
- Canberra Roller Derby League (women) and Varsity Derby League (women and men), the Australian Capital Territory's flat track roller derby leagues.
