= ACT Brumbies =

Australian rugby union team

- Union: Rugby Australia (ACT and Southern NSW)
- Founded: 1995; 31 years ago
- Location: Canberra, Australian Capital Territory
- Region: Australian Capital Territory, Southern New South Wales
- Ground: Canberra Stadium (Capacity: 25,011)
- Coach: Stephen Larkham
- Captain: TBA
- Most caps: Ben Alexander (154)
- Top scorer: Stirling Mortlock (1,019)
- Most tries: Joe Roff (57)
- League: Super Rugby
- 2026: 6th overall Playoffs: Qualifying-finalist
| 1st kit | 2nd kit |

Official website
- brumbies.rugby

The ACT Brumbies (known from 2005 to 2022 as simply the Brumbies) is an Australian professional rugby union team based in Canberra, ACT. The team competes in Super Rugby and is named after the feral horses that roam wildly in the capital's hinterland. The team represents the ACT and the neighbouring Far South Coast and Southern Inland regions of New South Wales.

The Brumbies were formed in 1996 to provide a third Australian franchise for the Super 12 competition (now known as Super Rugby). It was predicted at the time that the Brumbies, made up of players not wanted by the two other Australian teams (NSW Waratahs and Queensland Reds), would perennially underperform. Since then, they have enjoyed more success than all the other Australian teams combined, reaching seven finals and winning three. The Brumbies are traditionally known for their strong tactical kicking, set piece play, ball retention, and pressuring of opponents in their own half. The Brumbies are one of only four Super Rugby teams to win 250 games.

The Brumbies play in navy blue, white and gold kits. The team plays at Canberra Stadium (formerly known as Bruce Stadium) in Canberra, and are currently coached by Stephen Larkham.

== History ==
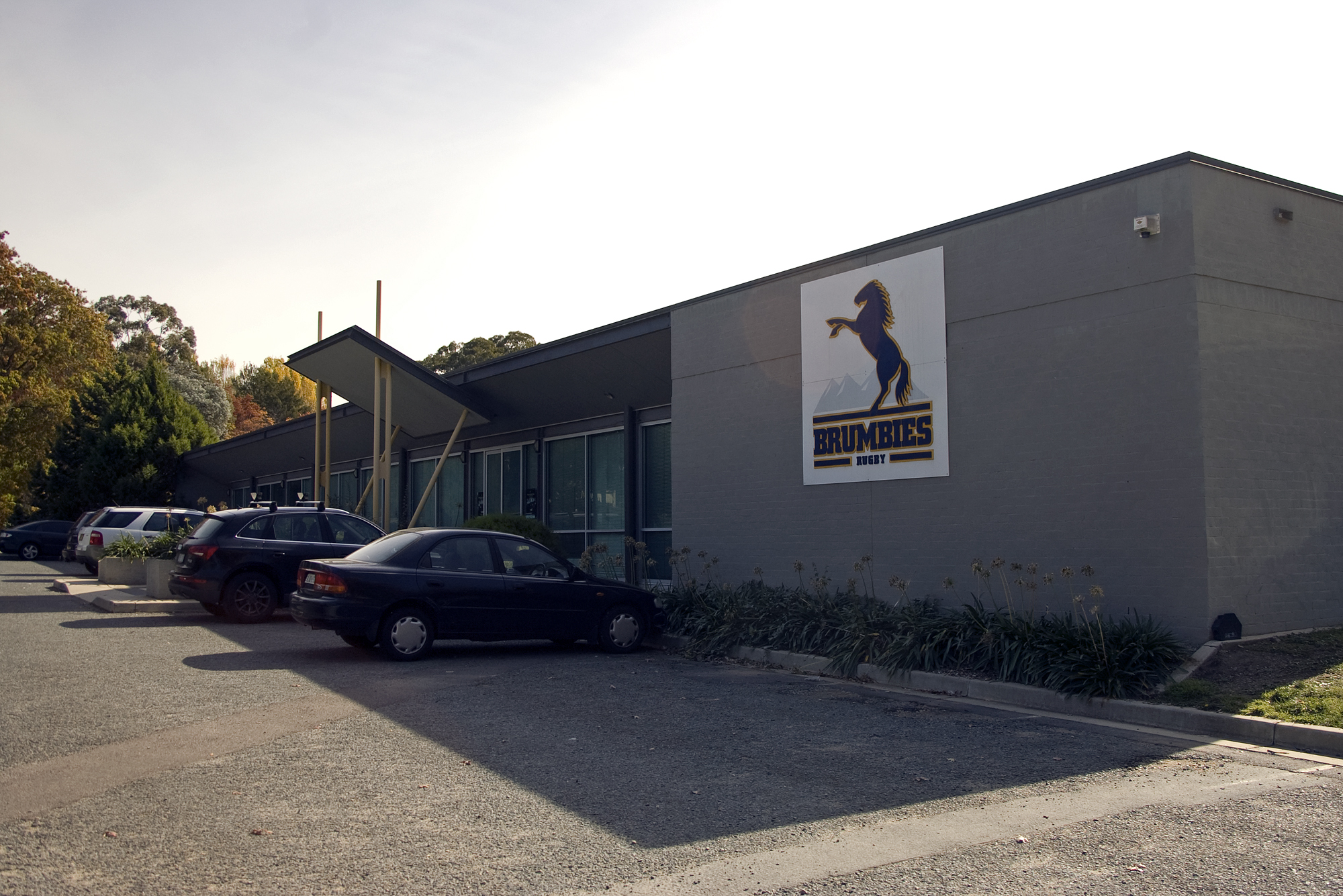
Brumbies previous headquarters in Griffith, Australian Capital Territory.

=== Early years of rugby in ACT ===
Rugby union football has a long history in the region around what is now Canberra. The British Isles opened their 1899 tour of Australia with a match in Goulburn. However, it was not until 1937 that the ACT Rugby Union (ACTRU) was finally established. Lieutenant-Colonel H. C. H. Robertson was the first president of the ACTRU.

The First Grade competition was started on 30 April 1938. Four clubs playing in the inaugural season: University, Easts, the Royal Military College (RMC), and Norths. There were strict eligibility rules for each of the four teams:

- University players were required to be graduates or undergraduates at a university (at the time, Canberra University College, operated by the University of Melbourne, was the only university in Canberra);
- Only service personnel, not members of RMC staff, were entitled join RMC; and,
- Easts and Norths players had to be residentially qualified for two months.

Also in 1938, a representative ACT side faced off against the All Blacks, with Frank Hassett scoring the ACT's only try in a 5–56 loss.

Five ACT players were chosen for New South Wales Country in their 1966 match against the British & Irish Lions at Manuka Oval:

- Barry Sibley (Canberra Royals);
- David Grimmond (Queanbeyan Whites);
- Mel Dunn (Ainslie Rugby Football Club);
- Peter Ryan (Queanbeyan Whites); and,
- Bruce Bailey (Goulburn Dirty Reds).

The first international victory for the ACT was in 1973, when they defeated Tonga 17–6 after trailing 0–3 at half time. The ACT team were praised for their hard work, stamina, and willingness to take shots at goal when they were on offer. In 1978, the ACT defeated Wales, who were Five Nations champions at the time, with a late penalty goal to win 21–20 after trailing 6–16 at half time. Head coach Colin Maxwell explained that his team beat the best team in the world by being "the first team in Australia to take them on up the guts", with the ACT forwards starving the Welsh of possession and the team ensuring territorial advantage through pressure on the Welsh kickers. Tactical kicking, ball retention, and pressuring opponents in their own half are still considered to be "The Brumbies' ... traditional strength[s]".

The ACT adopted the name 'Kookaburras' in 1989. The Kookaburras defeated the Waratahs 44–28 at Sydney's Concord Oval in 1994. The Waratahs team was filled with international representatives, which made the Kookaburras win all the more impressive, and led the way for the ACT becoming a professional franchise. Concerns over player depth in the ACT were assuaged when the ACT reserve team beat the New South Wales reserve team.

The ACT Brumbies was formally established on 9 December 1995 in Jindabyne, Southern New South Wales and became Australia's third provincial team with the start of Super Rugby.

=== Super 12 era: 1996–2005 ===
In the inaugural Super 12 season, under coach Rod Macqueen, the Brumbies finished fifth in the table after the regular season, narrowly missing out on a finals position. The following season was even more successful as the Brumbies entered the 1997 Super 12 Final, but lost to the Auckland Blues.

Eddie Jones took over as head coach in 1998, but the Brumbies fell to tenth place on the 1998 season ladder. However, the following season saw a big improvement, as they finished fifth for the second time in their Super rugby history, just missing out on the finals. In 2000, the Brumbies made it to the 2000 Super 12 Final for the second time, and were actually hosting it as well. They were however beaten by the Crusaders, losing 19 to 20.

In 2001 they backed up their good performance in 2000 to again enter the final, this time against the Sharks from Durban. The Brumbies won the match, and in doing so, became the first team outside of New Zealand to be crowned Super 12 champions (and the only such team in the Super 12 era; the Bulls of South Africa won the 2007 Super 14). That year the British Lions also came to Australia, and played a match against the Brumbies. The combined strength of four nations was pitted against the Brumbies Second XV with the tourists winning by just two points, 30 to 28.

David Nucifora took over as head coach at the Brumbies for the 2002 season. Under Nucifora the Brumbies entered their third Super 12 final in a row, again against the Crusaders who had defeated them in the 2000 final. The Crusaders won the match, 31 to 13. The following season, going for four straight final appearances, the Brumbies fell just short, being knocked out in the semi-finals by the Blues. They did however go on to beat Fiji and Tonga later that year.

In 2004 the Brumbies finished at the top of the Super 12 table, six points clear of the next best team. The Brumbies hosted the 2004 Super 12 Final as well, and were to face the Crusaders once again. Though this time, the Brumbies won, 47 to 38 in front of a record crowd at Canberra Stadium. During the off-season the ACT Rugby Union was renamed the ACT and Southern NSW Rugby Union, and the name of the team was changed to Brumbies Rugby.

Laurie Fisher took over as coach for the 2005 season. After an undefeated run in the early stages of the season, injuries began to mount up and the Brumbies eventually finished fifth, missing out on the finals. The following year the competition was expanded to the Super 14, introducing one new team from Australia and one new team from South Africa.

=== Super 14 era: 2006–2010 ===
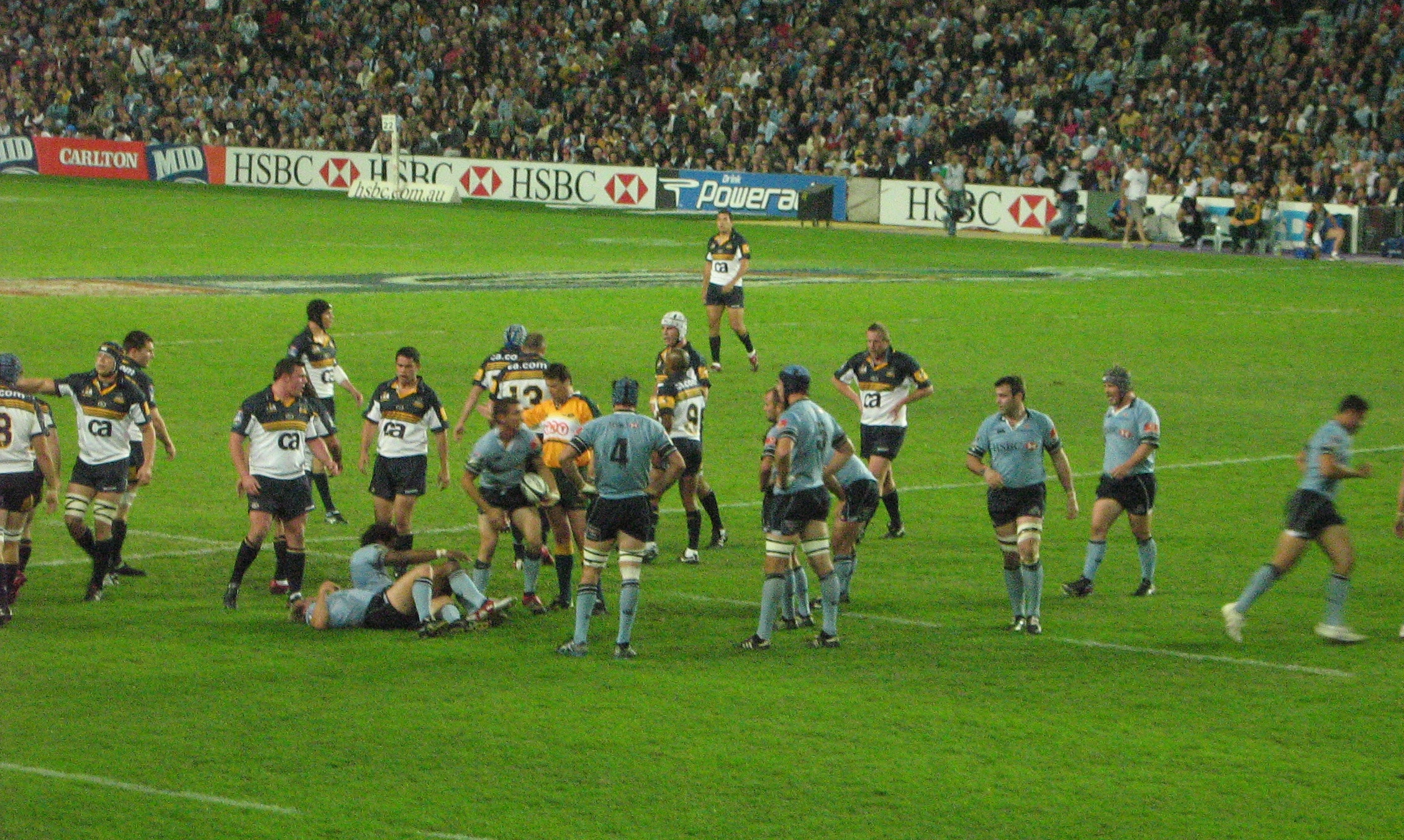
Brumbies vs Waratahs, April 2006

In 2006 the Brumbies finished sixth, missing out on the finals by 1 point, having never dropped out of the top four all season prior to the last round. Later that year the Brumbies played in the inaugural Australian Provincial Championship (APC). In their opening game they defeated the NSW Waratahs 14–13 at Viking Park. This win snapped a 3-game losing streak against their traditional rivals. They then went on to defeat the Western Force 25–10, again at Viking Park. Despite narrowly losing, 20–19, to the Queensland Reds on the road in Brisbane, the Brumbies won the right to face the Reds in the final back in Viking Park. They won this more comfortably, 42–17, securing the inaugural APC.

The side failed to make the playoffs at all during Super 14, though they never finished lower than ninth.

=== Super Rugby era: 2011–present ===
After a succession of coaches over the same period, including Laurie Fisher, Andy Friend and Tony Rea, former South Africa coach Jake White took over as coach of the side in April 2011, signing a four-year deal with the club. However, he was granted a release from his contract in September 2013, with two years left on his four-year contract.

In 2012, the Brumbies became the first Australian Super Rugby team to host an international fixture against a touring side. On 12 June, the Brumbies played Wales at Canberra Stadium while Wales was on their 2012 Summer tour. Wales won 25–15.

The Brumbies returned to form in the 2012, finishing second in the Australian conference, and seventh in the overall standings, narrowly missing the final-six and a place in the quarter finals.

In 2013, the Brumbies and the other Australian super rugby teams played the British & Irish Lions as part of the Lions' 2013 tour to Australia. The Brumbies earned a hard-fought 14–12 victory, the first defeat of the Lions on their tour.

The Brumbies continued their strong performances in 2013 by finishing first in the Australian conference and 3rd on the ladder to make their first finals appearance since they won the Super title in 2004. After defeating the Cheetahs in a close home final 15 – 13, the Brumbies travelled to Pretoria to face the Bulls and again achieved victory, 23–26. The team had to travel from South Africa to New Zealand to meet the Waikato Chiefs for the championship final the following week, and the Chiefs proved to be too strong, winning the final 27–22.

Following the end of the Super Rugby season the Brumbies sent a squad captained by Robbie Coleman to the invitational World Club 7s in England. The Brumbies won the series, defeating the Auckland Blues 17–14 in the final. Henry Speight was named the player of the tournament.

During the 2017 Super Rugby season, the Brumbies were one of three Australian franchises threatened with contraction when the Australian Rugby Union prevailed upon competition organiser SANZAAR to reduce the number of Australian sides in the competition from five to four after that season. The ARU later announced that the Brumbies would remain in the competition.

== Colours and name ==
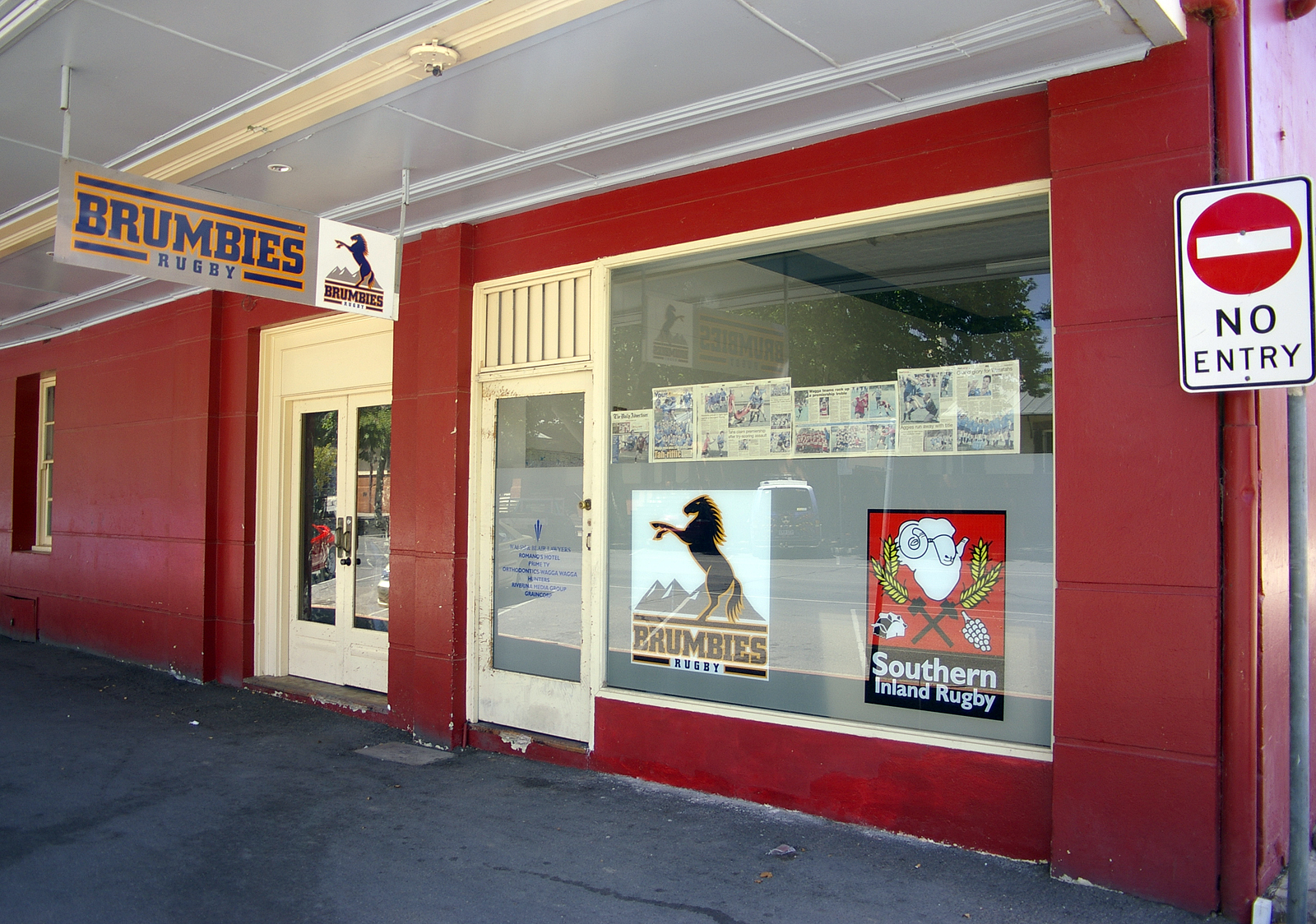
Brumbies and Southern Inland Rugby Union office in Wagga Wagga, New South Wales.

ACT Brumbies logo, used between 1996 and 2004.

The Brumbies traditional colours are navy blue, white and gold. Their primary jersey is navy with gold trim, with navy shorts and socks. The alternate jersey is gold and yellow, generally worn for away matches. The Brumbies also have a traditional jersey which is used for games against fellow Australian Super 12 foundation teams NSW and Queensland, which reflects the original home jersey worn between 1996 and 2005. This features a navy 'saddle' across the shoulders and white below chest level, with gold trim. The primary jersey sponsor is Safeguard Global, who signed a 3-year deal as naming rights sponsor of both men's and women's teams starting in 2023.

The team is named after the feral horses which inhabit Canberra's hinterland. The Brumbies mascot is Brumby Jack, with his counterpart Brumby Jill joining as a co-mascot in the 2010s. The Brumbies were originally known as the ACT Brumbies when they were accepted into the Super 12 for its inaugural season in 1996. Shortly after the 2004 season, two regional governing bodies in New South Wales – Far South Coast Rugby Union and Southern Inland Rugby Union, joined the ACT Rugby Union, which then renamed itself the ACT and Southern NSW Rugby Union. The team adopted a new name and logo for the 2005 season, dropping the "ACT" to become known simply as "The Brumbies". The name change identified that the team represented an area much larger than the Australian Capital Territory – with "Brumbies Territory" incorporating a number of regions through southern New South Wales including the Riverina, Shoalhaven, and Southern Highlands as well as the Sunraysia region incorporating parts of Victoria.

=== Shirt sponsors and manufacturers ===
| Period | Kit manufacturer | Major Sponsor | Other Jersey Sponsors | Shorts Sponsor |
|---|---|---|---|---|
| 1996 | Classic | Canberra Milk | n/a | n/a |
| 1997–1998 | Classic | Canberra Milk | CA | n/a |
| 1999–2000 | Canterbury | CA | n/a | n/a |
| 2001–2002 | Canterbury | CA | AAMI | n/a |
| 2003 | Canterbury | n/a | AAMI | n/a |
| 2004 | Canterbury | CA | Liberty Financial | n/a |
| 2005 | Canterbury | CA | Liberty Financial | Liberty Financial |
| 2006 | ISC | CA | Liberty Financial | Liberty Financial |
| 2007–2009 | ISC | CA | DHL | Royal Australian Navy |
| 2010–2011 | Kooga | CA | DHL | SG Fleet |
| 2012 | Kooga | University of Canberra | DHL, SG Fleet | All Homes |
| 2013 | BLK | University of Canberra | Land Rover, SG Fleet | All Homes |
| 2014 | Classic | University of Canberra | Land Rover, SG Fleet | All Homes |
| 2015 | Classic | Aquis Group | Land Rover, SG Fleet | All Homes |
| 2016 | Classic | Aquis Group | Land Rover, SG Fleet | Canberra Milk |
| 2017 | Classic | Plus500 | Aquis Group, Land Rover | Aquis Group |
| 2018 | Classic | Plus500 | Aquis Group, Land Rover | Austbrokers |
| 2019 | O'Neills | Plus500 | Aquis Group, Land Rover | Civium |
| 2020 | O'Neills | Plus500 | Land Rover, SG Fleet, Poplars | Vodafone |
| 2021 | O'Neills | Plus500 | SG Fleet, TAB, University of Canberra | All Homes |
| 2022 | O'Neills | Ray White | | DXC Technology |
| 2023 | O'Neills | Safeguard Global | ACT Government, Allhomes, O'Neills, SG Fleet, Shaw and Partners, TAB, Tiparra, University of Canberra | DXC Technology |
| 2024 | O'Neills | Safeguard Global | ACT Government, Allhomes, SG Fleet, Tiparra, University of Canberra | DXC Technology, O'Neills, Shaw and Partners |

== Stadium ==
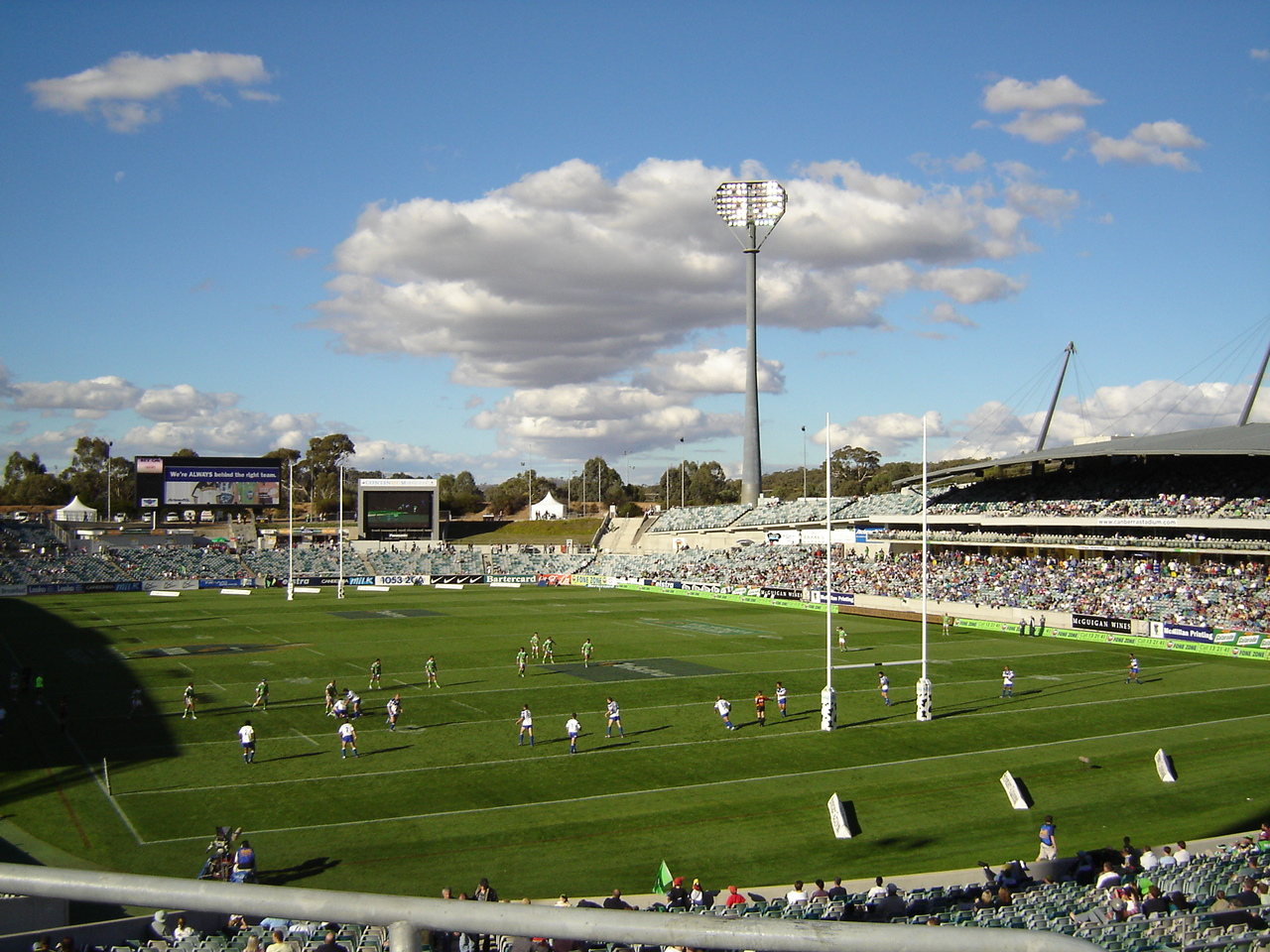
Canberra Stadium, the home of the Brumbies

The Brumbies play all their home fixtures at Canberra Stadium, located adjacent to the Australian Institute of Sport in Canberra. They share the ground with the Canberra Raiders rugby league team. Also, the Canberra Vikings, the Brumbies' affiliate in the short-lived Australian Rugby Championship, played one of their four regular-season home matches there. In 2003 matches from the 2003 Rugby World Cup were played at the stadium. Capacity is a nominal all-seated 25,011, however the largest crowd is actually 28,753, which was for the 2004 Super 12 Final. The Brumbies team did not use Canberra Stadium for their post-season APC games, instead taking their home fixtures to Canberra's Viking Park, which has a smaller capacity.

== Rivalries ==
=== New South Wales Waratahs ===
The Brumbies have traditionally had a fierce rivalry with the NSW Waratahs. Ascendency in the rivalry is now formally recognised by holding the Dan Vickerman Cup. The Brumbies are currently on a thirteen-game winning streak against the Waratahs.

In July 1994, before the formation of the Brumbies, the Canberra Kookaburras defeated the Waratahs 44–28 at Concord Oval in Sydney. The 1994 Waratahs side was otherwise unbeaten, but had missed an opportunity to compete for the 1994 Super 10 title due to a refusal to tour Apartheid South Africa. As a result, the Brumbies were the only team to beat the 1994 Waratahs.

The original Brumbies team was primarily made of players from the 1994 Kookaburras game, Waratahs 'rejects', and Queenslanders: all groups with reasons to dislike the Waratahs. Brisbane-born Brumby Troy Coker summed it up with "There was this entitlement thing around NSW rugby that the Canberra boys had a real distaste for." Ironically, despite being a team of 'rejects', the Brumbies have been the most successful Australian team in all competitions in the Super Rugby era.

Traditionally, the ACT-NSW rivalry was dominated by home victories (The only Brumbies away loss in the 2000 Season was against the Waratahs), with only two away victories in the Super 12 era, and none in the Super 14 era. The first away win in the rivalry came in the 2002 Semi Final, which the Brumbies won 51–10 at Sydney Football Stadium. The Waratahs won the first regular season away game in 2005. Dan Vickerman played for the winning team in both victories.

Since 2011, home dominance is no longer as significant: the first clash in the Super 15 era saw the Waratahs win 29–22 at Canberra Stadium, with the Brumbies getting revenge the following year with a 19–15 victory at the Sydney Football Stadium. Between the round 12 clash in 2015 and the round 17 clash in 2019, the home team lost six of the seven games.

The Waratahs got revenge for the 2002 Semi Final in the 2014 Semi Final, which they won 26–8. In the absence of Dave Dennis (their regular captain), the Waratahs were captained by Michael Hooper, who was named the Brumbies' best forward only two years earlier.

Brumbies fans took a lot of joy from beating the Waratahs 40–31 in the final round of 2018, as this prevented the Waratahs from finishing 2nd on the overall table. Daryl Gibson, head coach of the Waratahs, exclaimed that his side "was not focused on the job at hand, and getting ahead of itself in terms of already being in next week". Brumbies fans got additional joy from Gibson's post-match press conference, where he (incorrectly) claimed that the result did not affect the Waratahs playoffs picture.

Since 2016, the Brumbies have dominated the rivalry between the sides, winning in all but one of the last 17 meetings. The Brumbies' victory over the Waratahs in the last round of 2018 regular season kicked off a 13 match winning streak against their rivals, with the Waratahs unable to beat the Brumbies for 7 straight years. The Waratahs' victory over the Brumbies in Round 6 of 2025 broke the long losing streak and was described by former Waratahs player Morgan Turinui as ending "a decade of misery" for the NSW side. Despite the one-sided nature of the rivalry in recent years, the fixture has remained one of the most highly anticipated of the year for both teams.

=== Crusaders ===
The Brumbies have a historic rivalry with the Crusaders due to the two teams' predominance in early Super Rugby history. From 2010 to 2023, the Brumbies lost eleven games in a row against the Crusaders. In 2024, the Brumbies won their first game against the Crusaders in 15 years.

Between 1997 and 2006, every Grand Final included at least one of the Brumbies or the Crusaders. The two sides have met in three grand finals:

- 2000, at Bruce Stadium, Canberra, which the Crusaders won 20–19.
- 2002, at Jade Stadium, Christchurch, which the Crusaders won 31–13.
- 2004, at Bruce Stadium, Canberra, which the Brumbies won 47–38.

Former players and pundits likened the intensity of the clashes in the Super 12 and Super 14 era to Test match rugby, saying "It was basically the Wallabies v the All Blacks" and "Every time they met it was just great running rugby".

In common with the Waratahs rivalry, the away side rarely won in encounters during the Super 12 and Super 14 era. The Brumbies are the only team to have scored 50 points against the Crusaders (when they beat them in 2001), and have recorded the highest ever score in a grand final against them (47 points in the 2004 final). However, the Brumbies did not win a game against the Crusaders between 2009 and 2024, taking only two out of a maximum forty-five competition points from games against the Crusaders in the 2010s. The Brumbies were rarely criticised for their poor record against the Crusaders since 2009. Throughout the Brumbies streak of eleven losses against the Crusaders, the Brumbies were generally competitive with the Crusaders, having been within a score in their 2013, 2017, and 2021 fixtures.

Despite a long losing streak, the Brumbies remain one of few sides to have a (relatively) competitive win–loss record against the Crusaders. At the end of the Super 14 era, the Brumbies' record against the Crusaders was eight wins in eighteen games (44%). As on 18 May 2024, that record was nine wins in thirty games (30%). At that time, only two other current Super Rugby teams have a higher win rate against the Crusaders: the Hurricanes (15/46, or 33%), and the Chiefs (20/51, or 39%).

=== Queensland Reds ===
The 2020 Super Rugby AU final was contested by the Brumbies and the Reds, with the Brumbies winning 28–23. The Reds only won one game between these teams in the first fifteen years of Super Rugby. The Reds have the only away win in this rivalry since 2015, beating the Brumbies 40–38 in Canberra in a great Australian derby despite trailing 17-0 early in the game. The fierce rivals contested the 2021 Super Rugby AU final later that year. In a rematch of the previous year's fixture The Reds prevailed 19–16. The Brumbies led for almost the entire match and spent the final 10 minutes desperately defending their own line before a try by the Reds' captain James O'Connor five minutes into injury time handed the Reds victory and avenged the previous year's defeat.

The four years that Ewen McKenzie, who played for the Brumbies in Super 12, was coach of the Reds was considered the high water mark of the interstate rivalry. In 2010, 2012, and 2013, the Rod Macqueen Cup games decided whether either the Brumbies or the Reds made the playoff. In 2010, the Rod Macqueen Cup game was the difference between the Reds finishing 4th (in the playoffs) and 5th (not in the playoffs). In 2012 and 2013, if the losing team had won just one of the Rod Macqueen Cup games, they would have won the conference ahead of the other.

== Development teams ==
The Australian Capital Territory's two elite development squads just below full-time professional level are the Brumbies A and ACT Under 19 teams. These teams are closely aligned with the Brumbies and train at the same venue used by the Super Rugby squad. Many Brumbies players not involved in international rugby play for Canberra's team in the National Rugby Championship which also draws from the elite development squads. – See: Canberra Vikings

=== Brumbies A ===
The Brumbies A team plays matches against interstate and international representative teams, and has also competed in tournaments such as the Pacific Rugby Cup. Known by various names including ACT A, ACT XV, Brumbies A, and Brumby Runners, the team is selected from the best emerging rugby talent in the ACT and Southern NSW. The squad is composed of Brumbies contracted players, extended training squad members, ACT Under 19s, and selected Premier Division club players.

=== Under 19 ===
The Brumbies under 19 side plays in the URC competition. ACT teams played in the Southern States Tournament up until 2015 and also played occasional matches against other representative sides such as Pacific Rugby Cup teams. Prior to 2008, state colts teams at under 21 and under 21 age levels were fielded in national competitions. In 2018, an under 19 age limit was reinstated for the colts teams.

== Honours ==
International Provincial
| Competition | Winner | Runner up |
| Super Rugby | 2001, 2004 | 1997, 2000, 2002, 2013 |
| Australian Conference | 2013, 2016, 2017, 2019 | 2012, 2014, 2016 |
Australian Provincial
| Competition | Winner | Runner up |
| Super Rugby AU | 2020 | 2021 |
| Australian Provincial Championship | 2006 | |
| Ricoh National Championship | 1999 | 2000 |
International 7s
| Competition | Winner | Runner up |
| World Club 7s | 2013 | |
International 10s
| Competition | Winner | Runner up |
| World Club 10s | | 2014, 2016 |

== Season standings ==
| Super 12 | Super 14 | Super Rugby | COVID-affected seasons |

| Year | Competition | Table Position | Played | Won | Drawn | Lost | Points For | Points Against | Points +/- | Bonus Points | Try Bonus Points | Loss Bonus Points | Total Points | Finals Notes |
|---|---|---|---|---|---|---|---|---|---|---|---|---|---|---|
| 1996 Super 12 season | | 5th | 11 | 7 | 0 | 4 | 306 | 273 | +33 | 4 | 4 | 0 | 32 | Missed finals on tiebreakers (bonus points) |
| 1997 Super 12 season | | 2nd | 11 | 8 | 0 | 3 | 406 | 291 | +115 | 9 | 9 | 0 | 41 | Lost final to Blues |
| 1998 Super 12 season | | 10th | 11 | 3 | 0 | 8 | 248 | 364 | −166 | 5 | 3 | 2 | 17 | |
| 1999 Super 12 season | | 5th | 11 | 5 | 0 | 6 | 278 | 195 | +83 | 8 | 3 | 5 | 28 | Missed finals on head-to-head with Crusaders |
| 2000 Super 12 season | | 1st | 11 | 9 | 0 | 2 | 393 | 196 | +197 | 9 | 7 | 2 | 45 | Lost final to Crusaders |
| 2001 Super 12 season | | 1st | 11 | 8 | 0 | 3 | 348 | 204 | +144 | 8 | 6 | 2 | 40 | Defeated Sharks in final |
| 2002 Super 12 season | | 3rd | 11 | 7 | 0 | 4 | 374 | 230 | +144 | 10 | 7 | 3 | 38 | Lost final to Crusaders |
| 2003 Super 12 season | | 4th | 11 | 6 | 0 | 5 | 358 | 313 | +45 | 7 | 5 | 2 | 31 | Lost semi-final to Blues |
| 2004 Super 12 season | | 1st | 11 | 8 | 0 | 3 | 408 | 269 | +139 | 8 | 8 | 0 | 40 | Defeated Crusaders in final |
| 2005 Super 12 season | | 5th | 11 | 5 | 1 | 5 | 260 | 266 | −6 | 7 | 5 | 2 | 29 | Missed finals on head-to-head with Hurricanes |
| 2006 Super 14 season | | 6th | 13 | 8 | 1 | 4 | 326 | 269 | +57 | 4 | 3 | 1 | 38 | Missed finals on tiebreakers (bonus points and point differential) |
| 2007 Super 14 season | | 5th | 13 | 9 | 0 | 4 | 234 | 173 | +61 | 4 | 2 | 2 | 40 | Missed finals on tiebreakers (bonus points) |
| 2008 Super 14 season | | 9th | 13 | 6 | 0 | 7 | 277 | 317 | −40 | 6 | 4 | 2 | 30 | |
| 2009 Super 14 season | | 7th | 13 | 8 | 0 | 5 | 311 | 305 | +6 | 6 | 5 | 1 | 38 | Missed finals on tiebreakers (drawn games by Crusaders) |
| 2010 Super 14 season | | 6th | 13 | 8 | 0 | 5 | 358 | 291 | +67 | 5 | 3 | 2 | 37 | Missed finals on tiebreakers (drawn games by Crusaders) |
| 2011 Super Rugby season | | 13th | 16 | 4 | 1 | 11 | 314 | 437 | −123 | 7 | 3 | 4 | 33 | |
| 2012 Super Rugby season | | 7th | 16 | 10 | 0 | 6 | 404 | 331 | +73 | 10 | 5 | 5 | 58 | Missed finals on tiebreakers (win rate of Reds) |
| 2013 Super Rugby season | | 3rd | 16 | 10 | 2 | 4 | 430 | 295 | +135 | 8 | 5 | 3 | 60 | Lost final to Chiefs |
| 2014 Super Rugby season | | 4th | 16 | 10 | 0 | 6 | 412 | 378 | +34 | 5 | 4 | 1 | 45 | Lost semi final to Waratahs |
| 2015 Super Rugby season | | 6th | 16 | 9 | 0 | 7 | 369 | 261 | +108 | 11 | 6 | 5 | 47 | Lost semi final to Hurricanes |
| 2016 Super Rugby season | | 4th | 15 | 10 | 0 | 5 | 425 | 326 | +99 | 3 | 3 | 0 | 43 | Lost quarterfinal to Highlanders |
| 2017 Super Rugby season | | 4th | 15 | 6 | 0 | 9 | 315 | 279 | +36 | 10 | 3 | 7 | 34 | Lost quarterfinal to Hurricanes |
| 2018 Super Rugby season | | 10th | 16 | 7 | 0 | 9 | 393 | 422 | -29 | 6 | 2 | 4 | 34 | Missed finals on tiebreakers (drawn games by Sharks) |
| 2019 Super Rugby season | | 3rd | 16 | 10 | 0 | 6 | 430 | 366 | +64 | 8 | 5 | 3 | 48 | Lost semifinal to Jaguares |
| 2020 | 2020 Total | N/A | 14 | 11 | 0 | 3 | 397 | 262 | +135 | 7 | 6 | 1 | 51 | 2020 Super Rugby season cancelled due to the COVID-19 pandemic, Brumbies second overall, first overall in points per game. Defeated Reds in 2020 Super Rugby AU season final. |
| 2020 | 2020 Super Rugby season | 2nd | 6 | 5 | 0 | 1 | 208 | 115 | +93 | 3 | 2 | 1 | 23 | 2020 Super Rugby season cancelled due to the COVID-19 pandemic, Brumbies second overall, first overall in points per game. Defeated Reds in 2020 Super Rugby AU season final. |
| 2020 | 2020 Super Rugby AU season | 1st | 8 | 6 | 0 | 2 | 189 | 147 | +42 | 4 | 4 | 0 | 28 | 2020 Super Rugby season cancelled due to the COVID-19 pandemic, Brumbies second overall, first overall in points per game. Defeated Reds in 2020 Super Rugby AU season final. |
| 2021 | 2021 Total | N/A | 13 | 7 | 0 | 6 | 349 | 317 | +32 | 6 | 3 | 3 | 34 | Lost 2021 Super Rugby AU season final to Reds. |
| 2021 | 2021 Super Rugby AU season | 2nd | 8 | 6 | 0 | 2 | 267 | 165 | +102 | 5 | 3 | 2 | 29 | Lost 2021 Super Rugby AU season final to Reds. |
| 2021 | Super Rugby Trans-Tasman | 6th | 5 | 1 | 0 | 4 | 82 | 152 | -70 | 1 | 0 | 1 | 5 | Lost 2021 Super Rugby AU season final to Reds. |
| 2022 Super Rugby Pacific season | | 4th | 14 | 10 | 0 | 4 | 404 | 306 | +98 | 4 | 3 | 1 | 44 | Lost semifinal to Blues |
| 2023 Super Rugby Pacific season | | 4th | 14 | 10 | 0 | 4 | 474 | 393 | +81 | 6 | 5 | 1 | 46 | Lost semifinal to Chiefs |
| 2024 Super Rugby Pacific season | | 3rd | 14 | 12 | 0 | 2 | 410 | 311 | +99 | 4 | 4 | 0 | 52 | Lost semifinal to Blues |
| 2025 Super Rugby Pacific season | | 3rd | 14 | 9 | 0 | 5 | 448 | 361 | +87 | 8 | 4 | 4 | 44 | Lost semifinal to Chiefs |

== Current squad ==
The squad for the 2027 Super Rugby Pacific season is:

2027 ACT Brumbies squad
| **Props**: (Australia) **Allan Alaalatoa**; (Australia) Tevita Alatini; (Australia) Darcy Breen; (Australia) Lington Ieli; (Australia) **Blake Schoupp**; (Australia) **James Slipper**; (Australia) Rhys van Nek; **Hookers**: (Australia) Liam Bowron; (Australia) **Lachlan Lonergan**; (Australia) **Billy Pollard**; **Locks**: (Australia) Harvey Cordukes; (Australia) **Nick Frost**; (Australia) Toby Macpherson; (Australia) **Lachlan Shaw**; (Australia) Aiden Stait | **Loose forwards**: (Australia) **Charlie Cale**; (Australia) Eli Langi; (Australia) Rory Scott; (Australia) TJ Talaileva; (Australia) Leafi Talataina; (Australia) **Rob Valetini**; **Scrum-halves**: (Australia) **Ryan Lonergan**; (Australia) Dan Nelson; (Australia) Klayton Thorn; **Fly-halves**: (Australia) **Tane Edmed**; (Australia) **Declan Meredith** | **Centres**: (Australia) David Feliuai; (Australia) **Len Ikitau**; (Australia) Jarrah McLeod; (Australia) Kadin Pritchard; **Outside backs**: (Australia) Andy Muirhead; (Australia) Kye Oates; (Australia) Triston Reilly; (Australia) Ollie Sapsford; (Australia) **Corey Toole**; (Australia) **Tom Wright** |
**Bold** denotes internationally capped players. * denotes players qualified to play for Australia on residency or dual nationality. Source:

=== Super Rugby AUS ===
The squad for the 2026 Super Rugby AUS competition is:

2026 ACT Brumbies Super Rugby AUS squad
| **Props**: (Australia) Tevita Alatini; (Australia) Finn Baxter; (Australia) Darcy Breen; (Fiji) Lington Ieli; (Australia) Rhys van Nek; **Hookers**: (Australia) Liam Bowron; (Australia) Ewald Kruger; (Australia) **Lachlan Lonergan** (Note: Lonergan wasn't named in the original Super Rugby AUS squad, but was announced in the side for Round 3.); **Locks**: (Australia) **Nick Frost**; (Australia) Tavita Loughland; (Australia) **Lachlan Shaw** (Note: Shaw wasn't named in the original Super Rugby AUS squad, but was announced as a late inclusion in the side for Round 1.); (Australia) Josh Townsend; (New Zealand) Tu'ukalilkali Vaipulu; (Australia) Jack Wright | **Loose forwards**: (Australia) Oscar Cleary; (Australia) Darcy Fogarty; (Australia) Eli Langi; (Australia) Toby Macpherson **(c)**; (Fiji) Judah Saumaisue; (Australia) TJ Talaileva; **Scrum-halves**: (Australia) Dan Nelson; (Australia) Klayton Thorn; (Fiji) **Moses Sorovi**; **Fly-halves**: (Australia) **Tane Edmed**; (Australia) Chace Oates | **Centres**: (Australia) Dylan Bretton; (Samoa) David Feliuai *; (Australia) Jarrah McLeod; (Australia) Kadin Pritchard; **Outside backs**: (Australia) Triston Reilly; (Australia) Ollie Sapsford; (Australia) Oscar Shaw; (Australia) **Corey Toole**; (Australia) Will Trostel |
**(c)** denotes the team captain. **Bold** denotes internationally capped players. * denotes players qualified to play for Australia on residency or dual nationality. Source:

== Captains ==
As of 10 April 2022, there have been nineteen Brumbies captains. Ten of those captains were club captains, and eleven of those had been game-day only captains.

Ben Mowen captained the side on 51 occasions, more than any other Brumbies captain. He was captain for every game in his Brumbies career, and only missed two games in that period: against the Lions in 2012, and against the Rebels in 2013.

Only four players under 26 have captained the Brumbies: Owen Finegan, George Gregan, Nic White, and Ryan Lonergan. Nic White became the youngest Captain in Brumbies history when he captained the side against the Rebels on 7 June 2013. He was 22 years and 359 days old at the time.

Only four players over the age of 32 have captained the Brumbies: Owen Finegan, Stephen Moore, Scott Fardy, and Nic White. Stephen Moore became the oldest Captain in Brumbies history when he captained the side against the Reds on 13 February 2015 - at 32 years and 24 days old. With his final game for the Brumbies against the Highlanders on 22 July 2016, he set the current record for oldest Brumbies captain at 33 years and 184 days.

George Gregan is the only Brumbies captain to play every game of his captaincy tenure. Allan Alaalatoa is the only Brumbies captain to miss games of his captaincy tenure due to suspension.

There are more caps as captain than there are Brumbies games. This is because the Brumbies adopted a co-captaincy model between 2016 and 2018.

=== Club Captains ===
- Brett Robinson: 1996–2000
- George Gregan: 2001–2003
- Stirling Mortlock: 2004–2008
- Stephen Hoiles: 2009–2010
- Matt Giteau: 2011
- Ben Mowen: 2012–2014
- Stephen Moore: 2015
- Christian Lealiifano & Stephen Moore: 2016
- Sam Carter & Christian Lealiifano: 2017–2018
- Christian Lealiifano: 2019
- Allan Alaalatoa: 2020–present

(Correct as of 6 October 2026)

== Notable players ==
=== All Time Brumbies XV ===
During the gap between Super Rugby 2020 and the 2020 domestic competition, the Brumbies ran a fan poll to select an All Time Brumbies XV.

All Time Brumbies XV

1. Scott Sio; Loosehead Prop | 2. Jeremy Paul; Hooker | 3. Allan Alaalatoa; Tighthead Prop
4. Rory Arnold; Lock | 5. Radike Samo; Lock
6. Owen Finegan; Blindside Flanker | 8. Ben Mowen; Number 8 | 7. George Smith; Openside Flanker
9. George Gregan; Scrum half
10. Stephen Larkham; Fly-half
12. Matt Giteau; Inside centre
13. Stirling Mortlock; Outside centre
11. Joe Roff; Left wing | 14. Henry Speight; Right wing
15. Andrew Walker; Fullback
Reserves: 16. Stephen Moore, 17. Bill Young, 18. Ben Alexander, 19. David Giffin, 20. Scott Fardy, 21. Nic White, 22. Christian Lealiifano, 23. Mark Gerrard
Coach: Eddie Jones

=== List of individual accolades ===
Several Brumbies players have gone on to achieve greater recognition in the Rugby community, achieving such things as:

- **Being nominated for World Rugby Player of the Year**
  - George Gregan - Nominated in 2001
  - George Smith - Nominated in 2001
  - Matt Giteau - Nominated in 2004, 2009
  - David Pocock - Nominated in 2010, 2011, 2015
- **Being inducted to the World Rugby Hall of Fame**
  - George Gregan - Inducted in 2013 George Gregan
  - Stephen Larkham - Inducted in 2018 Stephen Larkham
  - George Smith - Inducted in 2023 George Smith
- **Winning the John Eales Medal**
  - Rob Valetini - Won in 2023
  - David Pocock - Won in 2010, 2018
  - Matt Giteau - Won in 2009
  - George Smith - Won in 2002, 2008
  - Jeremy Paul - Won in 2005
- **Winning the Rugby World Cup**
  - Joe Roff - Won in 1999
  - Rod Kafer - Won in 1999
  - Stephen Larkham - Won in 1999
  - George Gregan - Won in 1999
  - Brett Robinson - Won in 1999
  - Jim Williams - Won in 1999
  - David Giffin - Won in 1999
  - Owen Finegan - Won in 1999
  - Jeremy Paul - Won in 1999
  - Ewen McKenzie - Won in 1991
- **Winning Australian Super Rugby Player of the Year**
  - Rob Valetini - Won in 2022
  - David Pocock - Won in 2015
  - George Smith - Won in 2009, 2008, 2007, 2006
  - Joe Roff - Won in 2003, 1999
  - Stirling Mortlock - Won in 2002
  - Stephen Larkham - Won in 1998
- **Winning the Brett Robinson Award**
  - James Slipper - Won in 2023
  - Allan Alaalatoa - Won in 2022, 2020 and 2019
  - Rob Valetini - Won in 2021
  - Rory Arnold - Won in 2018
  - Henry Speight - Won in 2017
  - Christian Lealiifano - Won in 2016
  - David Pocock - Won in 2015
  - Jarrad Butler - Won in 2014
  - George Smith - Won in 2013, 2010, 2009, 2008, 2007, 2006, 2005, 2004, 2003, and 2001
  - Stephen Moore - Won in 2012
  - Matt Giteau - Won in 2011
  - Stirling Mortlock - Won in 2002
  - Jim Williams - Won in 2000
  - George Gregan - Won in 1999 and 1997
  - Stephen Larkham - Won in 1998
  - Owen Finegan - Won in 1996
- **Winning the Nick Farr-Jones Spirit of Rugby Award**
  - Garry 'Quinzo' Quinlivan - Won in 2020
  - Scott Fardy - Won in 2018

=== 100 Club ===
- 154 – Ben Alexander
- 150 – Christian Lealiifano
- 142 – George Smith
- 136 – George Gregan
- 136 - Tevita Kuridrani
- 123 – Stirling Mortlock
- 122 – Henry Speight
- 122 - Sam Carter
- 117 – Stephen Moore
- 116 – Stephen Larkham
- 116 - **Scott Sio**
- 112 – Jeremy Paul
- 102 – Mark Chisholm
- 100 – Bill Young

Note: Accurate as of 30 January 2020. Players in Bold are still playing for the Brumbies. Players in Bolded Italics are still playing Super Rugby.

== Coaches ==
Also see Category:ACT Brumbies coaches.

Brumbies Super Rugby Coaches
| Coach | Tenure | Games | Wins | Losses | Draws | Win % | Finals Appearances | Titles |
|---|---|---|---|---|---|---|---|---|
| (Australia) Rod McQueen | 1996–1997 | 24 | 16 | 8 | 0 | 67% | 1997 | None |
| (Australia) Eddie Jones | 1998–2001 | 48 | 28 | 20 | 0 | 58% | 2000, 2001 | 2001 |
| (Australia) David Nucifora | 2002–2004 | 38 | 24 | 14 | 0 | 63% | 2002, 2003, 2004 | 2004 |
| (Australia) Laurie Fisher | 2005–2008, 2014 | 68 | 38 | 28 | 2 | 56% | 2014 | None |
| (Australia) Andy Friend | 2009–2011 | 28 | 17 | 11 | 0 | 61% | None | None |
| (Australia) Tony Rea | 2011 | 14 | 3 | 11 | 0 | 21% | None | None |
| (South Africa) Jake White | 2012–2013 | 35 | 22 | 11 | 2 | 63% | 2013 | None |
| (Australia) Stephen Larkham | 2014–2017, 2023- | 96 | 58 | 38 | 0 | 60% | 2014, 2015, 2016, 2017, 2023 | None |
| (Australia) Daniel McKellar | 2018–2022 | 80 | 49 | 31 | 0 | 61% | 2019, 2020, 2021, 2022 | 2020 AU |

As of 18 May 2024.

== Team records ==
- Individual records sourced from 2020 Brumbies Official Sourcebook.
- Team records sourced from SAANZAR Results records.

=== Individual Records ===
As of 26 September 2021.
Players in bold currently play for the Brumbies.

Individuals who have scored 150 points in their Brumbies Career
| Player | Points Scored | Games played | Points per Game |
|---|---|---|---|
| Stirling Mortlock | 1019 | 117 | 8.7 |
| Christian Lealiifano | 958 | 150 | 6.4 |
| Joe Roff | 588 | 86 | 6.8 |
| Matt Giteau | 458 | 67 | 6.8 |
| Mark Gerrard | 306 | 78 | 3.9 |
| Andrew Walker | 246 | 47 | 5.2 |
| David Knox | 242 | 35 | 6.9 |
| Henry Speight | 230 | 122 | 1.9 |
| Stephen Larkham | 226 | 127 | 1.8 |
| Wharenui Hawera | 190 | 36 | 5.3 |
| **Nic White** | 170 | 85 | 2.0 |
| **Tom Banks** | 157 | 73 | 2.2 |
| **Noah Lolesio** | 155 | 23 | 6.7 |

Individuals who have scored 25 tries in their Brumbies Career
| Player | Tries Scored | Games played | Tries per Game |
|---|---|---|---|
| Joe Roff | 57 | 86 | 0.66 |
| Stirling Mortlock | 53 | 117 | 0.45 |
| Henry Speight | 46 | 122 | 0.37 |
| Stephen Larkham | 33 | 127 | 0.26 |
| Andrew Walker | 31 | 47 | 0.66 |
| **Tom Banks** | 31 | 73 | 0.42 |
| **Folau Fainga'a** | 29 | 52 | 0.56 |
| Owen Finegan | 29 | 90 | 0.32 |
| Tevita Kuridrani | 28 | 136 | 0.21 |
| Mark Gerrard | 27 | 78 | 0.35 |
| Joe Tomane | 25 | 68 | 0.37 |

Individuals who have scored 150 points in a season
| Player | Points Scored | Season |
|---|---|---|
| Christian Lealiifano | 231 | 2013 |
| Stirling Mortlock | 194 | 2000 |
| Joe Roff | 182 | 2004 |
| Matt Giteau | 171 | 2011 |
| Christian Lealiifano | 170 | 2015 |
| Christian Lealiifano | 163 | 2016 |

Individuals who have scored 10 tries in a season
| Player | Tries Scored | Season |
|---|---|---|
| Joe Roff | 15 | 1997 |
| Andrew Walker | 13 | 2000 |
| **Folau Fainga'a** | 12 | 2019 |
| Stirling Mortlock | 10 | 2004 |
| Mark Gerrard | 10 | 2004 |

=== Team Records ===
As of 18 May 2024.
Drua and Moana Pasifika to be added to home/away sections after at least five fixtures in each.

Best Home Results against each opponent
| | Blues | Bulls | Cheetahs | Chiefs | Crusaders | Force | Highlanders | Hurricanes | Lions | Rebels | Reds | Sharks | Stormers | Sunwolves | Waratahs |
|---|---|---|---|---|---|---|---|---|---|---|---|---|---|---|---|
| **Team** | **Blues** | **Bulls** | **Cheetahs** | **Chiefs** | **Crusaders** | **Force** | **Highlanders** | **Hurricanes** | **Lions** | **Rebels** | **Reds** | **Sharks** | **Stormers** | **Sunwolves** | **Waratahs** |
| **Highest Score** | 46–25 (2002) | 73–9 (1999) | 61–15 (2010) | 55–31 (2003) | 51–16 (2001) | 47–25 (2014) | 70–26 (1996) | 52–10 (2016) | 68–28 (2004) | 39–17 (2013); 39–26 (2020) | 51–8 (2004) | 51–10 (2000) | 40–25 (2001) | 66–5 (2016) | 61–10 (2021) |
| **Best Margin** | 37–15 (2009) | 73–9 (1999) | 61–15 (2010) | 49–6 (2001) | 51–16 (2001) | 41–7 (2013) | 70–26 (1996) | 52–10 (2016) | 64–0 (2000) | 37–6 (2012) | 47–3 (2015) | 51–10 (2000) | 37–15 (1999) | 66–5 (2016) | 61–10 (2021) |
| **Least Conceded** | 26–9 (2014) | 23–6 (2016) | 20–3 (2015) | 49–6 (2001) | 15–6 (2007) | 41–7 (2013) | 31–3 (2010) | 52–10 (2016) | 64–0 (2000) | 32–3 (2017) | 36–0 (2006) | 16–9 (2014) | 17–10 (2009) | 33–0 (2019) | 23–6 (2012); 35–6 (2013) |

Best Away Results against each opponent
| | Blues | Bulls | Cheetahs | Chiefs | Crusaders | Force | Highlanders | Hurricanes | Lions | Rebels | Reds | Sharks | Stormers | Sunwolves | Waratahs |
|---|---|---|---|---|---|---|---|---|---|---|---|---|---|---|---|
| **Team** | **Blues** | **Bulls** | **Cheetahs** | **Chiefs** | **Crusaders** | **Force** | **Highlanders** | **Hurricanes** | **Lions** | **Rebels** | **Reds** | **Sharks** | **Stormers** | **Sunwolves** | **Waratahs** |
| **Highest Score** | 35–7 (2001) | 45–35 (2002) | 40–27 (2009) | 45–17 (2000) | 32–33 (2002) | 39–38 (2022) | 33–31 (2009) | 37–49 (2005); 37–25 (2012) | 34–29 (2005); 34–20 (2012) | 30–3 (2024) | 52–13 (2009); 52–24 (2023) | 29–10 (2013) | 39–19 (2015) | 47–14 (2020) | 51–10 (2002) |
| **Best Margin** | 35–7 (2001) | 45–35 (2002); 38–28 (2018) | 40–27 (2009) | 45–17 (2000) | 29–7 (1996) | 24–0 (2020) | 29–10 (2007) | 37–25 (2012) | 34–20 (2012) | 30–3 (2024) | 52–13 (2009) | 29–10 (2013) | 36–15 (2002) | 47–14 (2020) | 51–10 (2002) |
| **Least Conceded** | 35–7 (2001) | 28–19 (2000) | 25–18 (2016) | 7–10 (2009) | 29–7 (1996) | 24–0 (2020) | 15–9 (1997); 8–9 (1999) | 10–11 (2007) | 14–9 (2007) | 30–3 (2024) | 29–0 (2015) | 29–10 (2013) | 36–15 (2002); 33–15 (2004); 15–15 (2006) | 47–14 (2020) | 51–10 (2002) |

Worst Home Results against each opponent
| | Blues | Bulls | Cheetahs | Chiefs | Crusaders | Force | Highlanders | Hurricanes | Lions | Rebels | Reds | Sharks | Stormers | Sunwolves | Waratahs |
|---|---|---|---|---|---|---|---|---|---|---|---|---|---|---|---|
| **Team** | **Blues** | **Bulls** | **Cheetahs** | **Chiefs** | **Crusaders** | **Force** | **Highlanders** | **Hurricanes** | **Lions** | **Rebels** | **Reds** | **Sharks** | **Stormers** | **Sunwolves** | **Waratahs** |
| **Lowest Score** | 12–18 (2017) | 7–19 (2007) | 15–13 (2013) | 13–16 (1999) | 8–21 (2018) | 14–12 (2007) | 9–15 (2016) | 13–23 (2010) | 6–13 (2017) | 8–13 (2015) | 16–12 (2022) | 16–9 (2014) | 3–16 (2011) | 33–0 (2019) | 6–10 (2005) |
| **Worst Margin** | 16–30 (2012) | 7–19 (2007) | 24–23 (2012) | 23–48 (2016) | 14–40 (2016) | 16–25 (2009) | 12–33 (2021) | 16–35 (2017) | 20–29 (2011) | 27–34 (2019) | 17–27 (2014) | 23–41 (1998) | 3–16 (2011) | 41–31 (2018) | 22–29 (2011); 17–24 (2018) |
| **Most Conceded** | 40–34 (1996) | 32–31 (2009) | 29–23 (2008); 24–23 (2012) | 23–48 (2016) | 14–40 (2016) | 42–45 (2025) | 12–33 (2021) | 16–35 (2017) | 20–29 (2011) | 27–34 (2019) | 38–40 (2021) | 23–41 (1998) | 40–25 (2001) | 41–31 (2018) | 22–29 (2011) |

Worst Away Results against each opponent
| | Blues | Bulls | Cheetahs | Chiefs | Crusaders | Force | Highlanders | Hurricanes | Lions | Rebels | Reds | Sharks | Stormers | Sunwolves | Waratahs |
|---|---|---|---|---|---|---|---|---|---|---|---|---|---|---|---|
| **Team** | **Blues** | **Bulls** | **Cheetahs** | **Chiefs** | **Crusaders** | **Force** | **Highlanders** | **Hurricanes** | **Lions** | **Rebels** | **Reds** | **Sharks** | **Stormers** | **Sunwolves** | **Waratahs** |
| **Lowest Score** | 0–17 (2005) | 7–24 (1998) | 20–38 (2007) | 7–10 (2009) | 3–33 (2006); 3–34 (2008) | 13–13 (2011) | 8–9 (1999) | 7–56 (2009) | 14–9 (2007) | 10–33 (2018) | 6–3 (2007) | 14–35 (2009) | 3–34 (1998) | 32–25 (2018) | 7–32 (1998); 7–41 (2011) |
| **Worst Margin** | 7–46 (2024) | 23–44 (2014) | 20–38 (2007) | 12–46 (2024) | 10–52 (2011) | 22–29 (2008) | 19–45 (2003); 17–43 (2018) | 7–56 (2009) | 24–42 (2018) | 10–33 (2018) | 14–36 (2019) | 14–35 (2009) | 3–34 (1998) | 32–25 (2018) | 7–41 (2011) |
| **Most Conceded** | 7–46 (2024) | 32–50 (2010) | 36–47 (2011) | 12–46 (2024) | 10–52 (2011) | 39–38 (2022) | 19–45 (2003) | 7–56 (2009) | 24–42 (2018) | 10–33 (2018) | 14–36 (2019) | 24–36 (2005) | 22–35 (2013) | 32–25 (2018) | 7–41 (2011) |

- Note: The Brumbies also played four Super Rugby fixtures against the Jaguares and two Super Rugby fixtures against the Southern Kings, but due to their small sample size, their results are not included in this table.

== See also ==
- University of Canberra Vikings
- Canberra Raiders

| Preceded by Crusaders | Super 12 Champions; 2001 | Succeeded by Crusaders |
| Preceded by Blues | Super 12 Champions; 2004 | Succeeded by Crusaders |
