= Harvey Cordukes =

Australian rugby union player

- Born: 13 September 2004 (age 22) Sydney, Australia
- Height: 202 cm (6 ft 8 in)
- Weight: 115 kg (254 lb; 18 st 2 lb)
- School: St Augustine's College, Sydney
- University: University of Canberra

Rugby union career
- Position: Lock
- Current team: Brumbies / Auckland
Senior career
Years	Team	Apps	(Points)
2026–	Brumbies	0	(0)
2026–	Auckland	7	(0)
- Correct as of 1 November 2026
International career
Years	Team	Apps	(Points)
2024	Australia U20	6	(5)
- Correct as of 1 November 2026

Harvey Cordukes (born 13 September 2004) is an Australian rugby union player, who plays for the Brumbies. His preferred position is lock.

== Early career ==
Cordukes was born in Sydney. He attended St Augustine's College, Sydney where he captained the rugby side, and studied at the University of Canberra, while playing rugby for the Uni-Norths Owls. He was named in the Australia U20 squad in 2024.

== Professional career ==
Cordukes performances at club level and in the Brumbies academy earned him selection for the Brumbies squad for the 2025 Super Rugby AUS competition. before being named in the full squad for the 2026 Super Rugby Pacific season, although he did not make an appearance in the competition. Cordukes skipped the 2026 Super Rugby AUS season, instead opting to play for Auckland in the 2026 Hilux NPC competition. He was then again named in the Brumbies side for the 2027 Super Rugby Pacific season.
