= Tuggeranong Vikings =

Australian rugby union club, based in Tuggeranong, ACT

(Australia) Tuggeranong Vikings RUFC
- Union: ACT & Sthn NSW Rugby Union
- Founded: 1973; 53 years ago
- Ground: Viking Park (Capacity: 8,000)
- President: Georgie Prasad
- Coach: Ryan Schultz
- League: ACTRU Premier Division
Team kit

Official website
- www.vikingsrugby.com.au

The Tuggeranong Vikings are a rugby union club based in Tuggeranong, Australian Capital Territory. It is supported by 4 licensed clubs based in Wanniassa, Greenway, Conder, Chisholm. The club has been successful in local and national competitions.

The Tuggeranong Vikings were the premiers of the ACTRU Premier Division competition in the 2009 season, defeating the Queanbeyan Whites.

== Notable players ==
- Justin Harrison - 34 test caps for Australia
- **Christian Lealiifano** - 101 caps for the ACT Brumbies. 16 test caps for Australia
- Joe Roff - 82 caps for the ACT Brumbies. 86 test caps for Australia
- Julian Salvi - 63 caps for the ACT Brumbies. 8 caps for Australia A from 2005 to 2007.
- **Tyrel Lomax** - 13 caps for the Melbourne Rebels, 31 caps for the Highlanders, 75 caps for the Hurricanes. 51 test caps for the All Blacks.

Note - Players highlighted in bold have not yet retired.

== See also ==
- ACTRU Premier Division
