= Ben Alexander (rugby union) =

Australian Rugby Union and Finska player

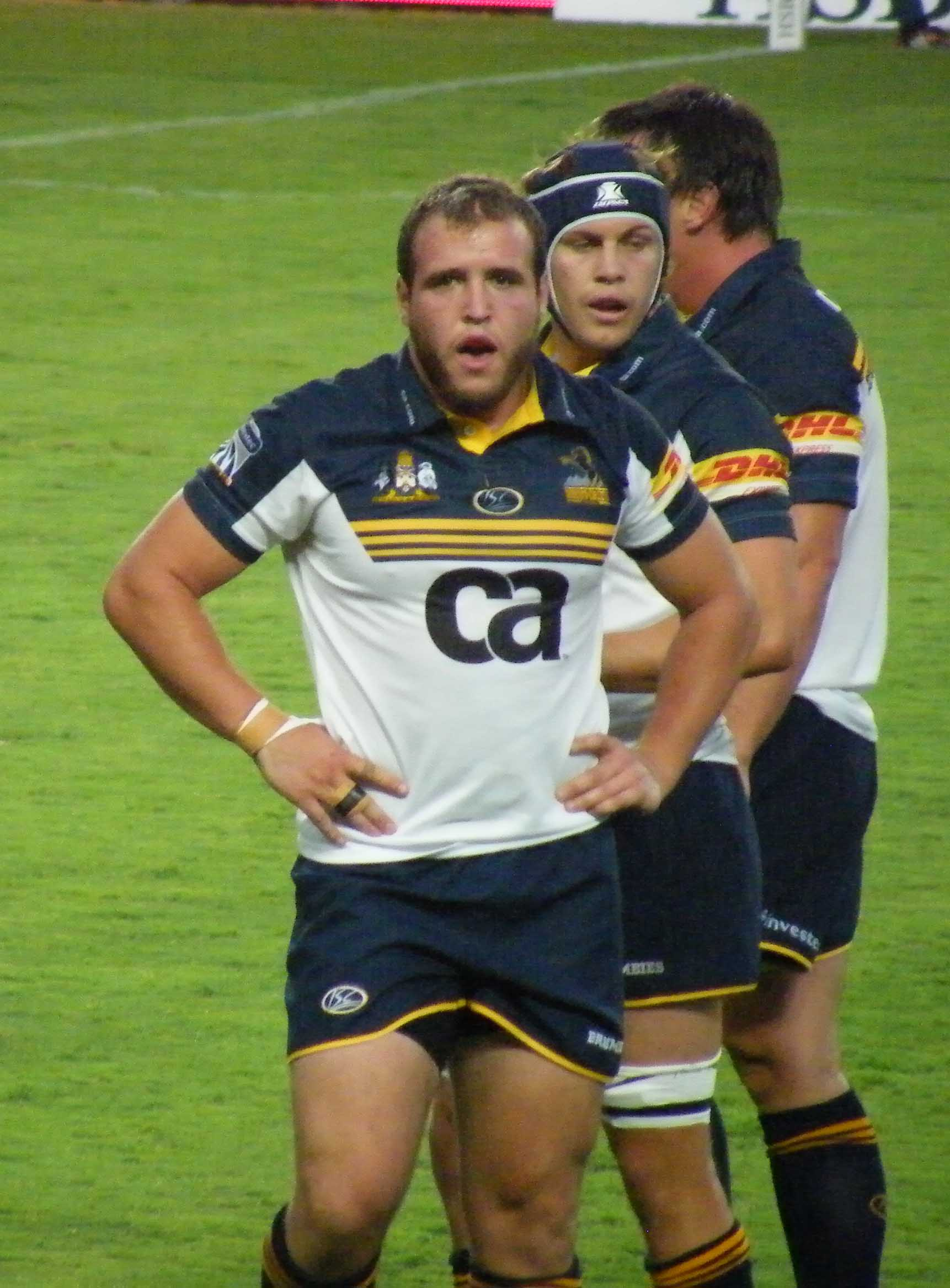
- Born: Ben E. Alexander; 13 November 1984 (age 42) Sydney, New South Wales, Australia
- Height: 189 cm (6 ft 2 in)
- Weight: 105.2 kg (16 st 8 lb; 232 lb)
- School: Knox Grammar School

Rugby union career
- Position: Tighthead Prop
Amateur team(s)
| Years | Team | Apps | (Points) |
| 2003–2018 | Uni-Norths Owls | 35 | |
Senior career
| Years | Team | Apps | (Points) |
| 2006–2007 | Bedford Blues | | |
| 2007 | Western Sydney Rams | 7 | (20) |
| 2014 | Greater Sydney Rams | 0 | (0) |
| 2015 | Canberra Vikings | 9 | (5) |
- Correct as of 22 February 2017
Super Rugby
| Years | Team | Apps | (Points) |
| 2008–2018 | Brumbies | 154 | (105) |
- Correct as of 14 July 2018
International career
| Years | Team | Apps | (Points) |
| 2008–2014 | Australia | 72 | (20) |
| 2005 | Australia U21 | | |
- Correct as of 30 November 2014
Medal record
Men's rugby union
Representing Australia
Rugby World Cup
| Bronze medal – third place | 2011 New Zealand | Squad |

Ben Alexander (born 13 November 1984) is an Australian former professional rugby union player. He played for the Greater Sydney Rams in the Australian domestic National Rugby Championship competition and for the Brumbies in the Super Rugby competition. Alexander has also played for the Australian national rugby union team, the Wallabies.

In 2025, he was awarded ACT Local Hero Australian of the Year for his contribution to mental health. On 2025, he was inducted into the University of Canberra Sport Walk of Fame. He completed a Bachelor of Sports Media at the University.

== Career ==
He played with Beecroft Cherrybrook Rugby club and played his colts rugby with the UC Owls in Canberra where he was selected to play for the Australian U21 and the Brumby Runners.

Alexander played for the Western Sydney Rams in the now defunct Australian Rugby Championship. Alexander's competition teammates included Kurtley Beale, Tatafu Polota-Nau, Lachie Turner and Josh Holmes.

Alexander also played for the Bedford Blues in what was National Division 1 (now rebranded the RFU Championship) in England during the 2006–07 season.

Alexander made his Brumbies debut in round 3 of the 2008 Super 14 season off the bench in round three against the Queensland Reds, scoring a try to the delight of the Brumbies home crowd, in particular the punters. He went on to play six games off the bench in that season. When the Wallaby squad was named by new coach Robbie Deans Alexander was a surprise inclusion after playing only six games for the Brumbies. He made his test debut against France in Sydney. In 2009, he played in all 13 games for the Brumbies and in all 14 games for the Wallabies.

Alexander became the top try scorer for the Brumbies in 2010, scoring 7 tries from 13 games. Although injury hindered his test season that year, he recovered to play all 5 tests in the Spring Tour.

== Super Rugby statistics ==
As of 14 July 2018

| Season | Team | Games | Starts | Sub | Mins | Tries | Cons | Pens | Drops | Points | Yel | Red |
|---|---|---|---|---|---|---|---|---|---|---|---|---|
| 2008 | Brumbies | 6 | 0 | 6 | 133 | 1 | 0 | 0 | 0 | 5 | 0 | 0 |
| 2009 | Brumbies | 13 | 9 | 4 | 817 | 3 | 0 | 0 | 0 | 15 | 0 | 0 |
| 2010 | Brumbies | 13 | 13 | 0 | 1036 | 7 | 0 | 0 | 0 | 35 | 0 | 0 |
| 2011 | Brumbies | 16 | 16 | 0 | 1207 | 3 | 0 | 0 | 0 | 15 | 0 | 0 |
| 2012 | Brumbies | 15 | 14 | 1 | 1031 | 2 | 0 | 0 | 0 | 10 | 0 | 0 |
| 2013 | Brumbies | 18 | 16 | 2 | 1251 | 0 | 0 | 0 | 0 | 0 | 1 | 0 |
| 2014 | Brumbies | 18 | 17 | 1 | 1176 | 0 | 0 | 0 | 0 | 0 | 1 | 0 |
| 2015 | Brumbies | 18 | 17 | 1 | 1012 | 3 | 0 | 0 | 0 | 15 | 0 | 0 |
| 2016 | Brumbies | 13 | 12 | 1 | 585 | 2 | 0 | 0 | 0 | 10 | 0 | 0 |
| 2017 | Brumbies | 15 | 5 | 10 | 0 | 0 | 0 | 0 | 0 | 0 | 0 | 0 |
| 2018 | Brumbies | 9 | 3 | 6 | 0 | 0 | 0 | 0 | 0 | 0 | 0 | 0 |
| Total | | 154 | 122 | 32 | 8248 | 21 | 0 | 0 | 0 | 105 | 2 | 0 |
