= Eastern Suburbs RUFC (Canberra) =

Australian rugby union club, based in Canberra, ACT

Easts Rugby Club Canberra
- Union: ACT & Sthn NSW Rugby Union
- Founded: 1938; 88 years ago
- Region: ACT
- Ground: Griffith Oval (Capacity: N/A)
- President: Nick Haralambous
- Coach(es): Caitlin Ryan, Sean Jones
- League: Canberra Suburban Cup

Official website
- www.eastsrugby.com

Easts Rugby Club Canberra, based in Griffith, Australian Capital Territory, is one of the foundation clubs of rugby union in the ACT. Established in 1938, the club has played a significant role in the development of rugby union in the region. Currently competing in the first division of the ACTRU competition, Easts previously fielded teams in the prestigious John I Dent Cup but have not participated at that level since 2020.

== History ==
Easts Rugby Club has a storied history within ACT rugby. The club was formerly affiliated with the Duntroon Rugby Club (RMC). Duntroon Rugby Club, benefiting from a strong pipeline of rugby talent. This affiliation allowed Easts to consistently field competitive teams. However, in the mid-1980s, RMC separated from Easts to establish its own independent rugby program, now competing in the ACT Division 1 competition.

Despite facing financial difficulties in the early 2000s, including the sale of its clubhouse in Manuka, Easts remained a competitive force on the field, regularly qualifying for finals. The club reached the grand final in 2008 but narrowly lost to the Queanbeyan Whites 22–15 in a closely contested match at Viking Park.

From 2009 to 2012, Easts struggled on the field, prompting efforts to revitalize the club. A notable initiative came in 2012 when Brumbies head coach Jake White, a Rugby World Cup-winning coach with the Springboks, sought to strengthen the local ACT rugby competition. As part of this initiative, several ACT Brumbies players were allocated to Easts, including Stephen Moore, Jerry Yanuyanutawa, Ben Hand, Michael Hooper, and Andrew Smith. This influx of talent helped bolster the squad, although the club's on-field success remained limited.

Further reinforcements came with the addition of high-profile players such as David Pocock, Clyde Rathbone, Jordan Smiler, Etienne Oosthuizen, Stephan Van der Walt, and Ruan Smith. Returning players Stephen Moore and Andrew Smith also rejoined the club during this period.

In 2012, Arch Vanderglas was elected club president, ushering in a period of administrative and coaching changes aimed at revitalizing Easts. He was re-elected for the 2013 season, a milestone year that saw the club celebrate its 75th anniversary, coinciding with Canberra's centenary celebrations.

== Participation ==
Easts currently compete in the Canberra Suburban Cup, maintaining a strong presence in Canberra's rugby scene. Despite their long history, the club has not secured a premiership title since 1947. Their closest attempt in recent years came in 2008 when they finished as runners-up to the Queanbeyan Whites.

Although Easts have faced challenges both on and off the field, the club remains a vital part of the ACT rugby community, continuing to foster talent and contribute to the region's rugby legacy.

== Notable players ==
Player	Professional rugby union club	International team
George Gregan	Brumbies, Toulon, Suntory	Australia
Guy Shepardson	Brumbies, Queensland Reds	Australia
Henry Vanderglas	Brumbies, FC Grenoble	N/A
Roland Suniula	North Harbour, FC Auch Gers, CS Vienne, RC Chalon, Ohio Aviators	United States
Stephen Moore	Brumbies, Queensland Reds, Queensland County	Australia
Matt Giteau	Brumbies, Western Force, Toulon, Suntory	Australia

== See also ==
- ACTRU Premier Division
