= 2013 World Club 7s =

- Host nation: England
- Date: 17-18 August 2013

Cup
- Champion: (Australia) ACT Brumbies
- Runner-up: (New Zealand) Auckland Blues
- Third: (Argentina) Buenos Aires

Plate
- Winner: (United States) New York
- Runner-up: (England) Gloucester

Shield
- Winner: (Russia) Kuban Krasnador
- Runner-up: (South Africa) Blue Bulls

Tournament details
- Matches played: 34

The 2013 World Club 7s was the first edition of the rugby sevens tournament and was hosted at Twickenham Stadium in London, England on 17 and 18 August 2013.

== Format ==
The teams were divided into pools of four teams, who played a round-robin within the pool. Points were awarded in each pool on the standard schedule for rugby sevens tournaments (though different from the standard in the 15-man game)—3 for a win, 2 for a draw, 1 for a loss. Following all the group games, the winner and runner up in each group progressed to the Knockout Stage along with the best two third-place teams.

== Teams ==
Team	Nation
ACT Brumbies	Australia
Auckland	New Zealand
Buenos Aires	Argentina
DHL Western Province	South Africa
Gloucester Rugby	England
Harlequins	England
Kuban Krasnodar	Russia
New York	USA
Northampton Saints	England
San Francisco	USA
Vodacom Blue Bulls	South Africa
VVA Saracens	Russia

== Pool Stage ==
Key to colours in group tables
quarter-final place

=== Pool A ===
Teams	Pld	W	D	L	PF	PA	+/−	Pts
(Russia) VVA Saracens Moscow	3	2	1	0	50	41	+9	8
(England) Gloucester Rugby	3	2	0	1	65	60	+5	7
(United States) New York	3	1	1	1	62	57	+5	6
(South Africa) DHL Western Province	3	0	0	3	53	72	−19	3

17 August 2013

DHL Western Province (South Africa)	19 – 26	(United States) New York

Twickenham Stadium, London

17 August 2013

Gloucester Rugby (England)	12 – 19	(Russia) VVA Saracens Moscow

Twickenham Stadium, London

17 August 2013

DHL Western Province (South Africa)	17 – 19	(Russia) VVA Saracens Moscow

Twickenham Stadium, London

17 August 2013

Gloucester Rugby (England)	26 – 24	(United States) New York

Twickenham Stadium, London

17 August 2013

New York (United States)	12 – 12	(Russia) VVA Saracens Moscow

Twickenham Stadium, London

17 August 2013

Gloucester Rugby (England)	27 – 17	(South Africa) DHL Western Province

Twickenham Stadium, London

=== Pool B ===
Teams	Pld	W	D	L	PF	PA	+/−	Pts
(Argentina) Buenos Aires	3	2	1	0	68	19	+49	8
(United States) San Francisco	3	2	0	1	59	62	–3	7
(England) Northampton Saints	3	1	0	2	29	56	–27	5
(South Africa) Vodacom Blue Bulls	3	0	1	2	33	52	−19	4

17 August 2013

Vodacom Blue Bulls (South Africa)	19 – 28	(United States) San Francisco

Twickenham Stadium, London

17 August 2013

Northampton Saints (England)	0 – 30	(Argentina) Buenos Aires

Twickenham Stadium, London

17 August 2013

Vodacom Blue Bulls (South Africa)	7– 7	(Argentina) Buenos Aires

Twickenham Stadium, London

17 August 2013

Northampton Saints (England)	12 – 19	(United States) San Francisco

Twickenham Stadium, London

17 August 2013

San Francisco (United States)	12 – 31	(Argentina) Buenos Aires

Twickenham Stadium, London

17 August 2013

Northampton Saints (England)	17 – 7	(South Africa) Vodacom Blue Bulls

Twickenham Stadium, London

=== Pool C ===
Teams	Pld	W	D	L	PF	PA	+/−	Pts
(New Zealand) Auckland	3	2	0	1	71	48	+23	7
(Australia) ACT Brumbies	3	2	0	1	71	50	+21	7
(England) Harlequins	3	2	0	1	69	57	+12	7
(Russia) Kuban Krasnador	3	0	0	3	36	92	−56	3

17 August 2013

Harlequins (England)	14 – 24	(Australia) ACT Brumbies

Twickenham Stadium, London

17 August 2013

Auckland (New Zealand)	33 – 5	(Russia) Kuban Krasnador

Twickenham Stadium, London

17 August 2013

Harlequins (England)	24 – 19	(Russia) Kuban Krasnador

Twickenham Stadium, London

17 August 2013

ACT Brumbies (Australia)	12 – 24	(New Zealand) Auckland

Twickenham Stadium, London

17 August 2013

ACT Brumbies (Australia)	35 – 12	(Russia) Kuban Krasnador

Twickenham Stadium, London

17 August 2013

Harlequins (England)	31 – 14	(New Zealand) Auckland

Twickenham Stadium, London

== Cup ==
=== Quarter-finals ===
18 August 2013

Buenos Aires (Argentina)	31 – 12	(United States) New York

Twickenham Stadium, London

18 August 2013

ACT Brumbies (Australia)	22 – 17	(Russia) WA Saracens Moscow

Twickenham Stadium, London

18 August 2013

Gloucester Rugby (England)	7 – 19	(England) Harlequins

Twickenham Stadium, London

18 August 2013

Auckland (New Zealand)	40 – 12	(United States) San Francisco

Twickenham Stadium, London

=== Semi-finals ===
18 August 2013

ACT Brumbies (Australia)	26 – 17	(Argentina) Buenos Aires

Twickenham Stadium, London

18 August 2013

Auckland Blues (New Zealand)	31–14	(England) Harlequins

Twickenham Stadium, London

=== Final ===
18 August 2013

ACT Brumbies (Australia)	17 – 14	(New Zealand) Auckland Blues

Twickenham Stadium, London

=== Third/fourth place match ===
18 August 2013

Buenos Aires (Argentina)	31 – 7	(England) Harlequins

Twickenham Stadium, London

== Plate (places 5 to 8) ==
=== Semi-finals ===
18 August 2013

Gloucester Rugby (England)	26 – 14	(United States) San Francisco

Twickenham Stadium, London

18 August 2013

New York (United States)	26–19	(Russia) VVA Saracens Moscow

Twickenham Stadium, London

=== Final ===
18 August 2013

New York (United States)	33 – 14	(England) Gloucester

Twickenham Stadium, London

=== Seventh/eighth place play-off ===
18 August 2013

San Francisco (United States)	12–33	(Russia) VVA Saracens Moscow

Twickenham Stadium, London

== Shield (places 9 to 12) ==
=== Semi-finals ===
18 August 2013

Western Province	19-31	Blue Bulls

Twickenham Stadium, London

18 August 2013

Northampton Saints	0–21	Kuban Krasnador

Twickenham Stadium, London

=== Final ===
18 August 2013

Kuban Krasnador	19–12	Blue Bulls

Twickenham Stadium, London

=== Eleventh/twelfth place play-off ===
18 August 2013

Western Province	31–7	Northampton Saints

Twickenham Stadium, London
