= Owen Butler (rugby union) =

Australia international rugby union player (born 1944)

- Born: Owen Frederick Butler; 31 May 1944 (age 82) Macksville, New South Wales

Rugby union career
- Position: lock
International career
Years	Team	Apps	(Points)
1969–71	Wallabies	7	(0)

Owen Frederick Butler (born 31 May 1944) was a rugby union player who represented Australia.

Butler, a lock, was born in Macksville, New South Wales and claimed a total of 7 international rugby caps for Australia.
