= David Grimmond =

Australia international rugby union & league player (1943–2024)

- Full name: David Noel Grimmond
- Born: 25 December 1943 Narrandera, New South Wales, Australia
- Died: 31 May 2024 (aged 80) Canberra, Australian Capital Territory, Australia

Rugby union career
- Position: Wing
Senior career
Years	Team	Apps	(Points)
–	Queanbeyan Whites		
International career
Years	Team	Apps	(Points)
1964	Australia	1	(0)
- Rugby league career

Playing information
- Position: Wing
Club
Years	Team	Pld	T	G	FG	P
1968	Queanbeyan Blues
1970	New South Wales
	Total	0	0	0	0	0

David Noel Grimmond (25 December 1943 – 31 May 2024) was an Australian rugby union international.

Grimmond, born in Narrandera, was educated at Canberra's St Edmund's College. He was a speedy winger, who in 1963 recorded a 10 seconds flat 100 yards run, while competing at the Country Athletics Championships.

A Queanbeyan Whites first-grade player, Grimmond gained Wallabies selection in 1964 for the tour of New Zealand. He was capped in the 2nd Test at Lancaster Park in Christchurch, playing on the left wing. He has Wallaby #494. The following year he was restricted by injury, then in 1966 he was considered unfortunate to miss selection for the British Lions Tests, with the uncapped George Ruebner preferred due to his goal-kicking skills.

Grimmond switched to rugby league in 1968 and played for the Queanbeyan Blues, later turning down an offer to join Penrith. He made the New South Wales state team in 1970 and had a two-try performance in a win over Queensland in Sydney, putting him in contention for national selection.

Grimmond's son David represented the ACT, Canberra Kookaburras and Australia 7s in rugby union.

== See also ==
- List of Australia national rugby union players
