= ACT and Southern NSW Rugby Union =

Rugby union governing body in Australia

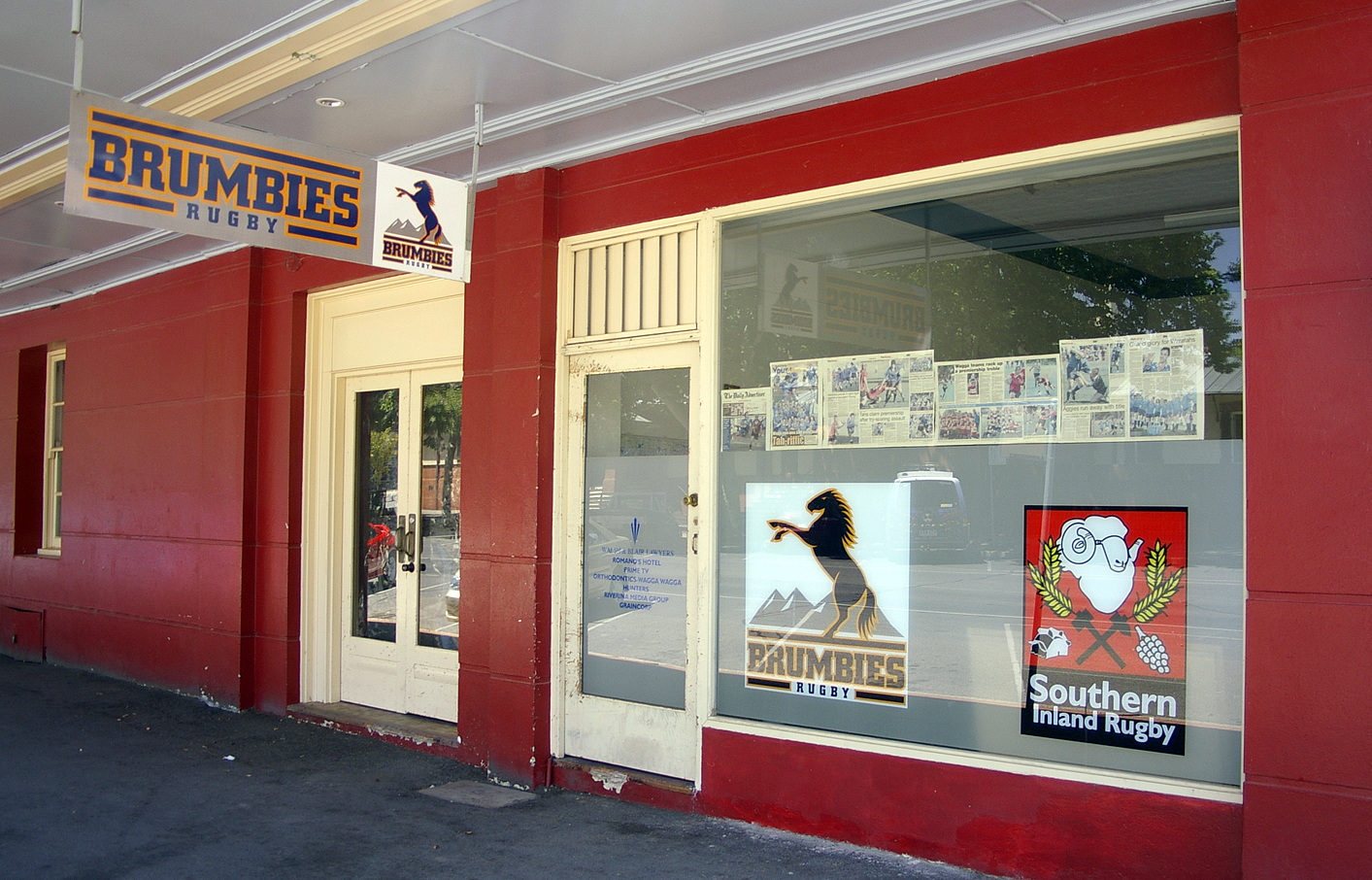
- Sport: Rugby union
- Founded: 1937 (as Federal Capital Territory RU)
- Rugby Australia affiliation: 1972
- Headquarters: Canberra
- Men's coach: Stephen Larkham
- Women's coach: Adam Butt

The ACT and Southern NSW Rugby Union is the governing body for rugby union in the Australian Capital Territory and southern regions of New South Wales. The union is represented by one team in the Super Rugby competition, the Brumbies. The ACT is also home to the Canberra Vikings in the National Rugby Championship.

== History ==
The union was founded in 1937 as the Federal Capital Territory Rugby Union (FCTRU). It became the Australian Capital Territory Rugby Union (ACTRU) in 1939, and eventually the ACT and Southern NSW Rugby Union. It received its current name prior to the 2005 Super 12 season, when the Far South Coast and Southern Inland unions of New South Wales joined the ACT and Monaro Rugby Unions. This change also led to the former ACT Brumbies being renamed Brumbies Rugby.

== Jurisdiction ==
The ACT and Southern New South Wales Union has jurisdiction over the southern-most bordering towns of New South Wales from the eastern coast over to Albury-Wodonga and Deniliquin. It also includes Griffith, Young, Yass, Taralga, as well as Goulburn, Batemans Bay, Wagga Wagga and Canberra.

== Competitions ==
The ACT and Southern NSW Rugby Union administers three senior competitions:

- ACT Rugby Union
- Far South Coast Rugby Union
- Southern Inland Rugby Union

== ACTRU Premier Division (John I Dent Cup) ==
ACTRU 1st XV Teams
Team	City/Suburb/Town	Home Ground
Canberra Royals	Canberra	Canberra Rugby Club
Gungahlin Eagles	Gungahlin	Gungahlin Enclosed Oval
Queanbeyan Whites	Queanbeyan	Campese Field
Tuggeranong Vikings	Tuggeranong	Viking Park
Uni-Norths Owls	Australian National University	University Oval
Wests Lions	Belconnen	Wests Rugby Club

=== Former teams ===
- Easts ACT
- Penrith Emus

== First Division ==
Team	City/Suburb/Town	Home Ground
ADFA	Australian Defence Force Academy	Dowsett Rugby Fields
Cooma Red Devils	Cooma	Rotary Oval
Easts ACT	Griffith, Australian Capital Territory	Griffith Oval
Goulburn Dirty Reds	Goulburn	Simon Poidevin Rugby Park
Hall Bushranger	Hall	Hall Sportsground
Royal Military College	Royal Military College, Duntroon	Portsea Oval

== Far South Coast Rugby Union (Incorporated into ACTRU Lower Grades) ==
This union is officially affiliated with the ACT and Southern NSW Rugby Union instead of the NSW union.

Team	Nickname
ADFA	ADFA
Batemans Bay-Broulee	Boars
Braidwood	Redbacks
Bungendore	Mudchooks
Cooma	Red Devils
Crookwell	Dogs
Hall	Bushrangers
Jindabyne	Bushpigs
Milton-Ulladulla	Platypi
Taralga	Tigers
Yass	Rams

=== Junior Teams ===
- Bermagui
- FSC Falcons (Tathra)

=== Former Teams ===
- Broulee Dolphins

== Southern Inland Rugby Union ==
This union is officially affiliated with the ACT and Southern NSW Rugby Union instead of the NSW union.

=== Clubs ===
Club	City	Home Ground	1st Grade Premierships	Ref
1st Grade
Albury-Wodonga Steamers	Albury/Wodonga	Murrayfield, Alexandra Park	1999-2000, 2013, 2015	
Charles Sturt University Reddies	Wagga Wagga	Conolly Park	2005	
Griffith Blacks	Griffith	Exies Oval No.1	1995, 2002–03, 2014	
Tumut Bulls	Tumut	Jarrah Sportsground	None	
Wagga Agricultural College	Wagga Wagga	Conolly Park	1997, 2007, 2009, 2012	
Wagga City	Wagga Wagga	Conolly Park	2020	
Wagga Waratahs	Wagga Wagga	Conolly Park	2001, 2004, 2008, 2010–11, 2016, 2018, 2019	
Leeton Phantoms	Leeton	Leeton No.1 Oval	2017	
3rd Grade Only
Hay Cutters	Hay	Hay Park Oval	1998	

=== Affiliated Clubs ===
- Hillston Hogs (invitational team)

=== Former clubs ===
- Condobolin (moved to Central West Rugby Union)
- Cootamundra Tri-Colours (moved to Central West Rugby Union)
- Deniliquin Drovers (fields only junior teams since 2025)
- Grenfell Panthers (moved to Central West Rugby Union)
- Junee Rams (folded 2016)
- Temora Tuskers (moved to Central West Rugby Union)
- West Wyalong Weevils (moved to Central West Rugby Union)
- Young Yabbies (moved to Central West Rugby Union)

=== Premiers (1995-present) ===
Riverina Zone/SIRU Premiers 1995–present
Year	1st Grade Premiers	2nd Grade Premiers	3rd Grade Premiers	Women's Premiers
1995	Griffith	Griffith	Griffith	N/A
1996	Army	Rivcoll	N/A	N/A
1997	Wagga Ag College	Griffith	N/A	Wagga City
1998	Hay	Rivcoll	N/A	Griffith
1999	Albury	Waratahs	N/A	Leeton
2000	Albury	Grenfell	N/A	Leeton
2001	Waratahs	Waratahs	N/A	Wagga City
2002	Griffith	Grenfell	N/A	N/A
2003	Griffith	Rivcoll	N/A	N/A
2004	Waratahs	Rivcoll	N/A	N/A
2005	Rivcoll	Rivcoll	N/A	N/A
2006	Cootamundra	Rivcoll	N/A	N/A
2007	Wagga Ag College	Rivcoll	N/A	N/A
2008	Waratahs	Waratahs	Wagga Ag College	N/A
2009	Wagga Ag College	Tumut	Wagga Ag College	N/A
2010	Waratahs	Waratahs	Griffith	N/A
2011	Waratahs	Waratahs	Hay	N/A
2012	Wagga Ag College	Wagga Ag College	Waratahs	N/A
2013	Albury	Waratahs	Junee	Leeton
2014	Griffith	CSU	Junee	Wagga City
2015	Albury	Leeton	Griffith	Leeton
2016	Waratahs	Waratahs	Waratahs	Leeton
2017	Leeton	Wagga City	Deniliquin	Leeton
2018	Waratahs	Waratahs	Waratahs	CSU
2019	Waratahs	Waratahs	Griffith	Griffith
2020	Wagga City	Leeton	N/A	Wagga Ag College
2022	Wagga City	Wagga City	Wagga City	Wagga Reddies
2023	Waratahs	Wagga City	Hay	Waratahs
2024	Waratahs	Wagga City	Hay	Tumut
2025	Waratahs	Wagga City	Wagga City	Waratahs

== ACT representative teams ==
The Territory's representative team hosted the All Blacks at Manuka Oval in the winter of 1938. The Canberra side managed to score a try before the interval and trailed the visitors at half time by 24–5 before the New Zealanders went on to win by 57–5. Coached by Frank O'Rourke, the home team had played its inaugural match only three months earlier.

The team's original strip featured an all gold jersey with two green bands. They defeated the Hawkesbury College at the Country Carnival earlier in 1938, and later that season won against the Bathurst side. Three players from the Territory team were selected for NSW Combined Country to play Sydney that year. The Australian Capital Territory team, often referred to simply as "Canberra", grew in stature in the decades following the Second World War. ACT won the Caldwell Cup for the Country Championship for the first time in 1964 and retained it for the following two seasons.

1990s Kookaburras rep team kit and logo.

Rugby in Canberra came of age in the 1970s. ACT scored a 17–11 away win over Queensland in 1972, and then had their first win over a national side, defeating Tonga by 17–6 in 1973.In 1975, ACT won promotion for the following season to the top division of the Wallaby Trophy, Australia's provincial championship at that time. The triumph was short-lived, however, because the planned tournament for 1976 was officially cancelled.

When Wales toured Australia in 1978, the ACT defeated them in a rousing 21–20 come-from-behind victory. The win over the reigning Five Nations champions showed that ACT could compete against the top tier of rugby players in the world.

The name "Canberra Kookaburras" was used for the ACT representative team from 1989, but it was to be a further five years before the Canberra Kookaburra club was officially founded. When the ACT comprehensively beat New South Wales by 44–28 in 1994, an invitation was issued for a Canberra club to play in the expanded 14-team NSWRU Premiership sponsored by AAMI for the following season.

=== Australian Rugby Shield ===
The Vikings entered the Australian Rugby Shield in 2006, playing as the "ACT & Southern NSW Vikings" following the renaming of the ACT Rugby Union after its expansion into Southern New South Wales the previous season. The team had two close matches against NSW Country and Perth Gold during the season, but managed to progress undefeated through the three pool games, semi-final and final to win the competition and take the shield. The Vikings played the Melbourne Axemen in the grand final at Viking Park and never looked back after the third minute when inside centre Josh Staniforth scored the first of the side's five tries for the match in a 36–10 win.

In 2022, with the Revival of Australian Rugby Shield ACT and Southern New South Wales Griffins were crowned champions defeating NSW Country 34-31 in the Grand Final at Brighton Oval, Adelaide.

Historical Kit

=== Honours ===
- Australian Rugby Shield Winners (2006, 2022)

== See also ==
- Rugby union in the Australian Capital Territory
- Brumbies
- ACTRU Premier Division
- ACT Veterans Rugby Club
