= Uni-Norths Owls =

Australian rugby union club, based in Canberra, ACT

(Australia) Uni-Norths
- Full name: Uni-Norths
- Union: ACT & Sthn NSW Rugby Union
- Nickname: Owls
- Founded: 1937 University (CUC) 1937 Northern Suburbs 1998 Universities (ANU-UC) 2001 Uni-Norths Owls
- Ground: ANU North Oval
- League: ACTRU Premier Division

Official website
- owlsrugby.com

The Uni-Norths Owls is a rugby union club located on the campus of the Australian National University (ANU) in Canberra, Australian Capital Territory. The club was a result of the merger of ANU and University of Canberra rugby clubs in 1998, with Northern Suburbs joining in 2001. The club's colours are navy, gold and green.

The Uni-Norths home playing fields and clubhouse, known as ‘The Barn’, are located on the grounds of the Australian National University and are within a few minutes walk of the Canberra CBD. The clubhouse has a second-floor balcony which overlooks the Rugby and Cricket No. 1 Oval, with a licensed bar facility and a large catered function centre.

== History ==
The rugby clubs of Northern Suburbs and Canberra University College (CUC, which later integrated with the ANU) were foundation members of the Federal Capital Territory Rugby Union (FCTRU). The FCTRU, which later became the ACTRU and eventually the ACT and Southern NSW Rugby Union, was formed in 1937. The Canberra grade competition began in 1938.

The Northern Suburbs club played in a myrtle green jersey and was known as the Galloping Greens. Norths won the John I Dent Cup for the premiership seven times between 1940 and 1972. Notable players for Norths include Owen Butler, who was selected for the Wallabies in 1969.

The ANU club wore a jersey with blue and white hoops, and started playing in the first grade competition in 1960 after an amalgamation of existing ACTRU grade clubs from Canberra University College (entered first grade in 1938) and Australian Forestry School (entered first grade in 1949). Notable ANU players include Laurie Fisher who captained the first grade team to win the John I Dent Cup in 1992 and later became the coach of the Brumbies.

In 1998 the ANU Rugby Club was amalgamated with the University of Canberra Rugby Club (UC Killer Bees). The UC club had fielded teams in the Monaro Division competition and was founded in 1971 at the Canberra College of Advanced Education (CCAE), which became the University of Canberra in 1990.

Norths ceded from the ACTRU Premier competition in 2001 and formed a coalition with the new university club. Although not a legal merger, the coalition proved successful, with the Norths Junior Owls receiving additional coaching and administrative resources and junior players progressing through to the senior club.

== Recent events ==
The club won the Queanbeyan Rugby Sevens Tournament in both the men's and women's competitions in 2009.

The Owls won the Laffan Cup, awarded to the winning team of the Australian Universities Rugby Championship in 2011.

The Owls Women's premier division side (XV's) won the 2019 Grand Final defeating Royals 40–19.

== Honours ==
=== John I Dent Cup ===
Uni-Norths Owls
Premierships (1): 2025
Australian National University (1959–98)

Premierships (1): 1992.

Northern Suburbs (1938–2000)

Premierships (7): 1972, 1971, 1967, 1963, 1956, 1948, (Note: 1948 joint winners Northern Suburbs & Royal Military College Duntroon) 1940.

Notes

Women's Premier - Premierships (4): 2006, 2010, 2015, 2019.

== Coaches ==
The Owls' current coaches are:

- 1sts Coach: Russell Ingram, Assistant: Sam Rolfe, Manager: Deon Norval
- Women: Greg Ritchie,
- 2nds Coach: Wayne Giddings
- Colts Coaches: Charlie Fairfield-Smith
- 3rds & 4ths Coach: Dave Oliver

== Notable members ==
Players who have gone on to gain international or provincial caps:

- Owen Butler (Norths) – Australia 1969–71.
- Laurie Fisher (ANU) – ACT representative team 1985–92, Brumbies coach 2005–08, 2014.
- Ben Alexander (Uni-North Owls) – Brumbies & Wallabies
- David Pocock (Uni-North Owls) - Western Force, Brumbies & Wallabies

(list may be incomplete)
