= Peter Ryan (rugby union, born 1940) =

Australia international rugby union player

- Born: Peter Francis Ryan; 2 April 1940 (age 86) Queanbeyan, New South Wales
- School: St Joseph's College

Rugby union career
- Position: fullback
International career
Years	Team	Apps	(Points)
1963–66	Wallabies	4	(6)

Peter Francis Ryan (born 2 April 1940) was a rugby union player who represented Australia.

Ryan, a fullback, was born in Queanbeyan, New South Wales and claimed a total of 4 international rugby caps for Australia.

== Published sources ==
- Howell, Max (2006) Born to Lead - Wallaby Test Captains (2005) Celebrity Books, New Zealand
