= Wests Lions =

Australian rugby union club, based in Canberra, ACT

(Australia) Wests Lions
- Full name: Western District RUFC, ACT
- Union: ACT & Sthn NSW Rugby Union
- Nickname: Lions
- Founded: 1962; 64 years ago
- Ground: Jamison Oval
- President: David Bensley
- Coach: Marco Cecere
- League: ACTRU Premier Division
- 2005: Premiers
Team kit

Official website
- www.westslions.com.au

The West Lions are a rugby union club based in the Belconnen area of Canberra, Australian Capital Territory.

In 2005, Wests won grand finals across every grade.

The team's colours are Maroon and Blue.

== Honours ==
WESTS LIONS (1962–present)

- John I Dent Cup – Premierships (13): 1969, 70, 73, 74, 75, 76, 78, 93, 96, 2000, 01, 02, 05.

== See also ==
- ACTRU Premier Division
