= ACTRU Premier Division =

Rugby union competition in Canberra, Australia

- Sport: Rugby Union
- Founded: 1973
- No. of teams: 6
- Country: Australia
- Most recent champion: Tuggeranong Vikings
- Most titles: Canberra Royals
- Website: Website

The ACTRU Premier Division is a rugby union club competition based in Canberra, Australia, and conducted by the region's governing body, the ACT and Southern NSW Rugby Union. It contains four Senior Grades of competition plus Colts, and is competed by the six ACT Premier Division clubs, plus a team from the ADFA, which fields teams in Colts and 3rd Grade only. First Grade teams compete for the John I Dent Cup. The silver cup, which was first played for in 1938, was a gift to the union by the pastoralist John I Dent. The competition finals are now held at Viking Park.

== Premier Division clubs ==
Team	City/Suburb/Town	Home Ground
Canberra Royals	Canberra	Canberra Rugby Club
Gungahlin Eagles	Gungahlin	Gungahlin Enclosed Oval
Easts Beasts (in recess)	Griffith	Griffith Oval, Easts Rugby Club
Queanbeyan Whites	Queanbeyan	David Campese Field Queanbeyan
Tuggeranong Vikings	Tuggeranong	Viking Park
Uni-Norths Owls	Canberra (A.N.U)	University Oval
Wests Lions	Belconnen	Wests Rugby Club

== John I Dent Cup winners ==
Year	Premiers
2026	Tuggeranong Vikings
2025	Uni-Norths Owls
2024	Canberra Royals
2023	Gungahlin Eagles
2022	Queanbeyan Whites
2021	Cancelled due to COVID-19 (Note: Play-offs cancelled in 2021 due to the impact of COVID-19. Tuggeranong Vikings were minor premiers.)
2020	Canberra Royals
2019	Canberra Royals
2018	Tuggeranong Vikings
2017	Canberra Royals
2016	Tuggeranong Vikings
2015	Canberra Royals
2014	Tuggeranong Vikings
2013	Tuggeranong Vikings
2012	Tuggeranong Vikings
2011	Tuggeranong Vikings
2010	Queanbeyan Whites
2009	Tuggeranong Vikings
2008	Queanbeyan Whites
2007	Queanbeyan Whites
2006	Tuggeranong Vikings
2005	Wests Lions
2004	Tuggeranong Vikings
2003	Gungahlin Eagles
2002	Wests Lions
2001	Wests Lions
2000	Wests Lions
1999	Tuggeranong Vikings
1998	Tuggeranong Vikings
1997	Tuggeranong Vikings
1996	Wests Lions
1995	Tuggeranong Vikings
1994	Tuggeranong Vikings
1993	Wests Lions
1992	ANU
1991	Canberra Royals
1990	Canberra Royals
1990	Canberra Royals
1989	Canberra Royals
1988	Canberra Royals
1987	Canberra Royals
1986	Daramalan
1985	Canberra Royals
1984	Daramalan
1983	Queanbeyan Whites
1982	Queanbeyan Whites
1981	Queanbeyan Whites

Year	Premiers
1980	Canberra Royals
1979	Canberra Royals
1978	Wests Lions
1977	Canberra Royals
1976	Wests Lions
1975	Wests Lions
1974	Wests Lions
1973	Wests Lions
1972	Northern Suburbs
1971	Northern Suburbs
1970	Wests Lions
1969	Wests Lions
1968	Canberra Royals
1967	Northern Suburbs
1966	Canberra Royals
1965	Canberra Royals
1964	Canberra Royals
1963	Northern Suburbs
1962	RMC
1961	RMC
1960	RMC
1959	Queanbeyan Whites
1958	Canberra Royals
1957	Canberra Royals
1956	Northern Suburbs
1955	RMC
1954	Canberra Royals
1953	RMC
1952	RMC
1951	RMC
1950	RMC No. 2
1949	RMC
1948	RMC & Northern Suburbs
1947	Eastern Suburbs
1946	RMC
1945	RMC
1944	RMC
1943	RMC
1942	RMC
1941	Eastern Suburbs & RMC
1940	Northern Suburbs
1939	Royal Military College (RMC)
1938	Royal Military College (RMC)

== See also ==
- Rugby union in the Australian Capital Territory
- List of Australian club rugby union competitions
