= Queanbeyan Whites =

Australian rugby union club, based in Queanbeyan, New South Wales

(Australia) Queanbeyan RUFC
- Union: ACT & Sthn NSW Rugby Union
- Founded: 1954; 72 years ago
- Ground: Campese Field
- President: Mick Pini
- Coach: Sam French
- League: ACTRU Premier Division
Team kit

Official website
- whitesrugby.com

The Queanbeyan Rugby Union Football Club is a rugby union club based in Queanbeyan, New South Wales. They have earned the nickname 'Queanbeyan Whites' due to the colour of their playing jersey. The club competes in the ACTRU Premier Division.

== Club history ==
The Queanbeyan Rugby Union Football Club was formed in 1954 and commenced playing in the ACT Rugby Union Competition in 1955. In the Club’s first season, Queanbeyan went on to become joint Canberra Cup Premiers. Queanbeyan won their first Premiership in 1959, defeating Royals 21-14 in the Grand Final. More recently they broke a 24-year premiership drought by winning the ACTRU Premier Division John I Dent Cup Grand Final in 2007 in which they defeated the Gungahlin Eagles 33-12. The following season proved to be arguably the finest in the club's history with First, Second and Colts grades finishing the season as minor premiers. The club was also awarded the honour of Champion Club and Club Champions for the first time ever.

The club have won the ACTRU Premiership (John I Dent Cup) several times; including a run of three successive premierships from 1981-1983. The Whites were John I Dent Premiers in 1959, 1981, 1982, 1983, 2007, 2008, 2010 and 2022.

== Notable players ==
The club has produced several professional and international rugby union stars.

Player	Professional rugby union club	International team
David Campese	New South Wales Waratahs	Australia
Robbie Coleman	Brumbies	N/A
Anthony Fainga'a	Brumbies, Canberra Vikings, Queensland Reds	Australia
Saia Fainga'a	Brumbies, Canberra Vikings, Queensland Reds	Australia
Ipolito Fenukitau	Brumbies	Tonga
Matt Giteau	Brumbies, Western Force, RC Toulonnais	Australia
David Grimmond	N/A	Australia
Anthony Hegarty	Brumbies, Canberra Vikings, FC Grenoble	N/A
Viliame Iongi	Brumbies, Nottingham R.F.C., Scarlets	Tonga
Jack Lam	Tasman, Waikato, Wellington, Bristol Rugby	Samoa
Peter Ryan	N/A	Australia
James Stannard	Brumbies, Western Force, Perth Spirit	N/A
Ricky Stuart	Canberra Raiders, Canterbury Bulldogs (NRL)	Australia
Nic White	Brumbies, New South Wales Country Eagles, Montpellier	Australia
