= Gungahlin Eagles =

Australian rugby union club, based in Gungahlin, ACT

(Australia) Gungahlin Eagles RUFC
- Union: ACT & Sthn NSW Rugby Union
- Founded: 1967; 59 years ago
- Region: North Canberra - Gungahlin
- Ground: Nicholls Oval
- President: Lee O'Sullivan
- Coach: Robbie Coleman
- League: ACTRU Premier Division
- 2017: -
Team kit

Official website
- www.gungahlineagles.com.au

Nicholls Oval
- Location: Nicholls, Australian Capital Territory
- Surface: Grass

Tenant
- Gungahlin Eagles (1999 - present)

The Gungahlin Eagles is a rugby union club based in Gungahlin, Australian Capital Territory.

== Club history ==
The club was founded as the Daramalan RUFC club in 1967, going on to win two premierships. In 1999 the club moved to Gungahlin, where the club has continued to grow, including winning the 2003 premiership.

- 1967 Entered Sub-District Competition; B Grade Minor Premiership and Premiers
- 1969 Entered District Competition in 4th Grade; Won Minor Premiership
- 1970 3rd Grade Minor Premiership and Premiers
- 1973 Attained 1st Grade status; Jon Hardy first Senior Representative
- 1975 Club Champions; 1st Grade Pre-season Knockout winners
- 1976 Sub-District Premiers (Quinn Cup); first time in 1st Grade semi-finals
- 1978 Club Champions; Reserve Grade Minor Premiership; 4th Grade Minor Premiership and Premiers
- 1980 3rd Grade Premiers
- 1981 Club Champions; Reserve Grade Minor Premiership and Premiers; 1st Grade Pre-season Knockout winners
- 1982 Club Champions; Reserve Grade, 3rd Grade and 4th Grade Minor Premiership; 3rd Grade Premiers; first time in 1st Grade Grand Final
- 1983 Club Champions; 1st Grade Minor Premiership; Reserve Grade and 3rd Grade Premiers; 1st Grade Pre-season Knockout winners
- 1984 1st Grade Minor Premiership and Premiers; Reserve Grade Premiers
- 1985 Reserve Grade Premiers
- 1986 1st Grade Premiers; 3rd Grade Minor Premiership and Premiers; Craig Morton first player chosen in Australian Sevens and later chosen to join Wallaby tour of New Zealand
- 1989 1st Grade Minor Premiership
- 1990 Reserve Grade Premiers
- 1991 1st Grade Minor Premiership; Reserve Grade Minor Premiership and Premiers; 3rd Grade Premiers
- 1994 3rd Grade Premiers; Marco Caputo first player to earn a Test Cap for Australia
- 1995 3rd Grade Premiers
- 1996 Colts Minor Premiership; Adam Friend and Marco Caputo join inaugural ACT Brumbies
- 1997 Colts Premiers
- 1998 3rd Grade Minor Premiership
- 2003 1st Grade Premiers
- 2017 First Division 1st Grade Premiership
- 2018 Wagga Super 7s rugby tournament (Women's) Champions
- 2019 2nd Grade & 1st division 1st
- Grade premiers (including minor premierships), Colts minor premiers & ACT Rugby Union Club Champions.
- 2023 1st Grade Premiers; 4th Grade Minor Premiership and Premiers

== Notable players ==
- Peter McGrath
- Craig Morton
- Leigh Donnellen
- Murray Harley
- Marco Caputo
- Adam Friend
- Matt Hall
- Adam Harley
- Tom Ross
- Mack Hansen
- Edward Field-Wilson

== See also ==
- ACTRU Premier Division
