= Canberra Royals =

Australian rugby union club, based in Canberra, ACT

(Australia) Canberra Royals Rugby Union Football Club
- Union: ACT & Sthn NSW Rugby Union
- Founded: 1949; 77 years ago
- Ground: Phillip Oval
- President: Jim Taylor
- Coach: Joe Kolokihakaufisi
- League: ACTRU Premier Division
- 2024: Premiers
Team kit

Official website
- www.royalsrugby.com.au

The Canberra Royals Rugby Football Club is an Australian rugby union club, based in Canberra.

== Club history ==
Canberra Royals identifies closely with the Royals Foundation Team of 1949. The current Club Patron is life member, John Kelsey.

Royals has produced over 20 Australian representatives including 11 Wallabies, 14 Wallaroos, and more than two dozen representatives Australia wide.

The Club has featured in 70 percent of all grand finals since the establishment of rugby in Canberra, and has won 20 First Grade Premierships. The women's team has won 14 premierships contested to date and was undefeated in 2000 and 2001.

Royals is renowned for its rugby innovation and a number of its former players, coaches and managers have gone on to establish careers in the Brumbies (which is an acknowledged world class organisation) and with interstate and overseas rugby clubs.

Players include; Brumbies contract players, Connal McInerney, Andy Muirhead and Rory Scott. Former Bluebagger, Tom Staniforth, is currently playing pro rugby in France.

== See also ==
- ACTRU Premier Division
