= Viking Park =

Stadium in Australia

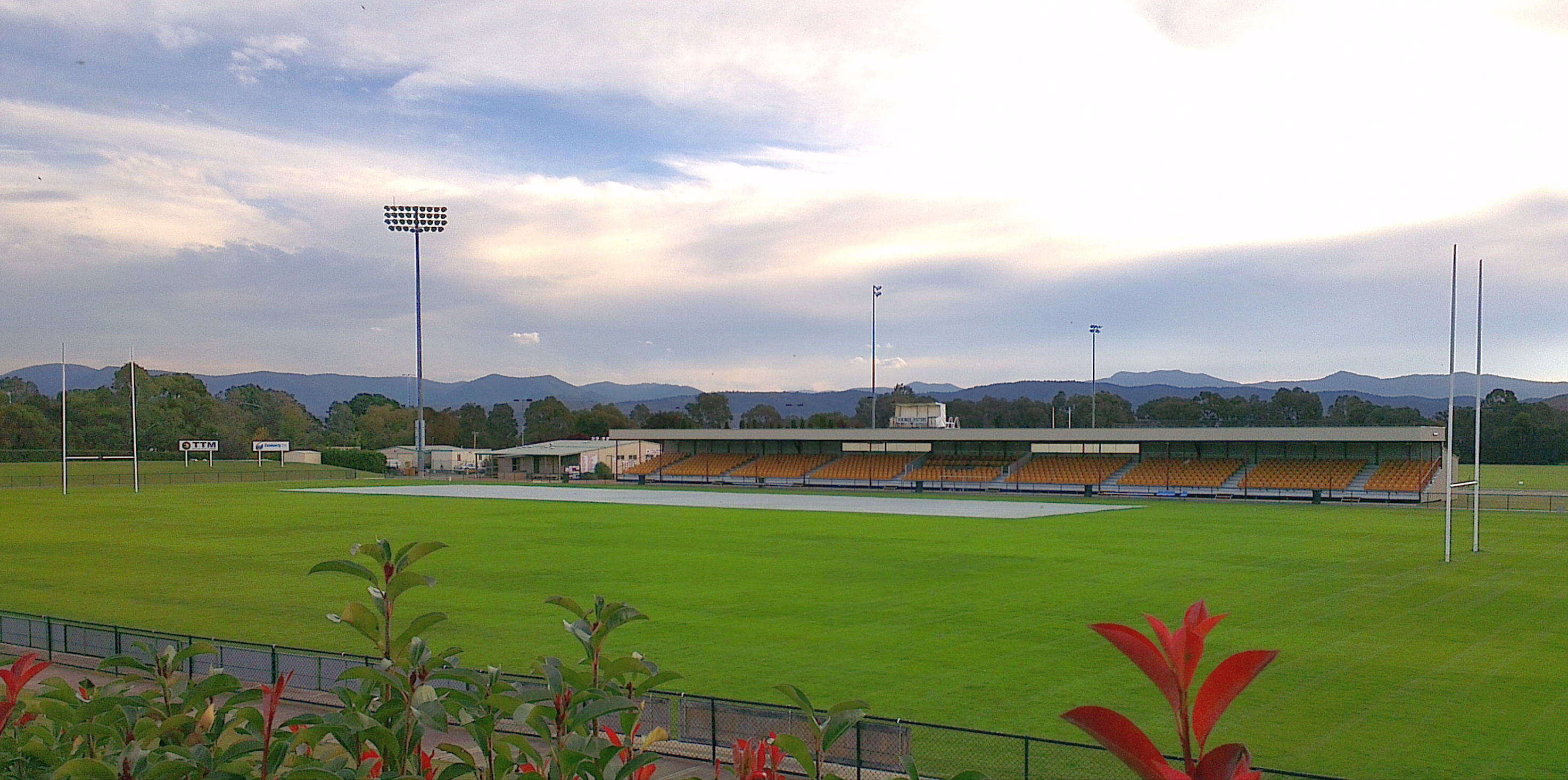
- The Home of Rugby in the Tuggeranong Valley
- Interactive map of Viking Park
- Location: 4 Amsinck St, Wanniassa, Australian Capital Territory
- Coordinates: 35°24′19″S 149°5′44″E
- Owner: Vikings Group
- Capacity: 7,000
- Surface: Grass
- Scoreboard: Yes
- Record attendance: 5,581 (Canberra Olympic vs. Sydney FC FFA Cup Semi Final

Construction
- Cost: $6m

Tenants
- Tuggeranong Vikings (ACTRU Premier Division); ACT Brumbies (Super Rugby AUS)

Website
- Viking Park Home

Viking Park is an 7,000 capacity (1,000 seated) multi-sport stadium located in the Tuggeranong Valley suburb Wanniassa, Canberra, Australia. It has a rectangular playing surface which is used primarily to host rugby union matches but additionally has hosted rugby league, Association football and baseball. It is home to the Tuggeranong Vikings and all matches of the ACTRU Premier Division finals, the Canberra Vikings who compete in the National Rugby Championship and the Tuggeranong Vikings Baseball Club. Viking Park is also regularly utilised by ACT-based Super Rugby club The Brumbies, who use the venue for training and who used to play home matches in the Australian Provincial Championship there.

== Stadium Facilities ==
The $6 million complex has two fields: a training field and a main field with a 1,000-seat grand stand. State of the art lighting lights up both the main ground and the training ground with the lighting for the main ground meeting TV broadcast requirements and the lighting for the training ground meeting Super Rugby training requirements. There are six large dressing room sheds, first-aid medical room for strapping and massage, canteen, numerous storage facilities and state of the art training equipment for scrum work and contact drills as well as a baseball diamond. There is direct access to the Vikings Erindale Club from the venue.

== Primary Use ==
Viking Park is primarily used as a rugby union venue with primary tenants Tuggeranong Vikings playing their home matches in the ACTRU Premier Division and Canberra Vikings playing in the National Rugby Championship (NRC). In the summer months, it is converted into a baseball park and serves as the home venue for the highly successful Tuggeranong Vikings Baseball Club.

== Events History ==
=== 2006 Tri-Nations training camp ===
In 2006, the Wallabies used the ground in preparation for an upcoming game in the Tri Nations against New Zealand. They held an open training session on 10 August 2006 at Viking Park. As part of the training camp, Australia 'A' played a match at Viking Park against Tonga U18s on August 15, 2006.

=== 2008 Women's Rugby International Test Series ===
7 July 2008, Australian Rugby Union (ARU) announced a twin test match series between the Wallaroos (Australia) and the Black Furns (New Zealand) to be played in Canberra at Viking Park in October 2008. The announced series was the first women's rugby internationals played in Australia since the 2001 Test against England in Newcastle.

14 October 2008, In the first test match, Australia started brightly but soon found themselves second best as New Zealand's forward pack led the visitors to run in three tries before half time to take a 19-3 lead into the break. After half time the Black Furns added another two tries to finish the match 37-3 victors.

18 October 2008, the second game on the Saturday night was a lot closer than the opening match a few days earlier. Australia led 10-8 early in the first half before New Zealand scored two tries to fight back into the lead at half time. The match remained tight but New Zealand were too strong for Australia in the end as they won the match 22-16 and clinched the series 2-0.

=== 2014 FFA Cup ===
22 August 2014, Tuggeranong United drew A-League powerhouse Melbourne Victory in the round of 16 FFA Cup draw, giving the team from Canberra's south a home 2014 FFA Cup round of 16 match. Tuggeranong United could not use their normal home ground due to its inadequate lighting and facilities so the ACT NPL club announced Viking Park as the venue for the high-profile match. The draw also enabled the opportunity for an emotional homecoming for former Tuggeranong United junior and Socceroo midfielder Carl Valeri.

In the lead-up to the Tuesday fixture, Tuggeranong United's players put their day jobs on hold and went into camp at the Alpha Hotel to prepare for the match at Viking Park against the Victory.

16 September 2014, Viking Park hosted its first Association football match between Tuggeranong United and Melbourne Victory in the 2014 FFA Cup. 5150 people turned out in what was the record breaking crowd for Viking Park until Olympic's 2016 FFA Cup fixture against Sydney FC. Tuggeranong United was put to the sword by a very strong Melbourne Victory team. A-League star and Victory marquee, Besart Berisha, scored a hat-trick on the night to lead Victory to a 6-0 drubbing of the home team. The venue and match were declared as a success with only one minor hiccup occurring at the match when a Melbourne Victory fan let off a flare. The man was arrested by ACT Police and received a fine and five-year ban.

=== 2016 FFA Cup ===
29 September 2016, Viking Park was announced as the host venue for the FFA Cup semi-final clash between Canberra Olympic FC and Sydney FC after Olympic deemed the financial costs of hosting the game at Canberra Stadium to be too high as well as a better atmosphere at Viking Park being achievable.

19 October 2016, Viking Park played host to an FFA Cup semi-final for the first time in 2016. Canberra Olympic FC took on A-League heavyweights Sydney FC after playing the previous three rounds at smaller venue Deakin Stadium. 5,581 turned out to watch the match, which set a new record crowd for Viking Park. Canberra Olympic were the final NPL club left in the competition and they proved good competition for Sydney, especially in the early stages of the match. However, Olympic were not good enough to contain the star-studded Sydney-siders who played all their marquee signings against the Canberrans. Filip Hološko, Bobô and returning Socceroo Bernie Ibini all starred for Sydney as they scored three goals to claim a three to nil victory over the home side. And with the loss, Olympic's unlikely dream 2016 FFA Cup run ended at Viking Park.

== Records ==
Record attendance: 5,581 (Canberra Olympic FC vs Sydney FC, 19 October 2016, FFA Cup semi-final)
