= Forest Rugby Club =

Australian rugby union club, based in Forestville, NSW

Forest
- Full name: Forest Rugby Football Club
- Nickname: Forest
- Founded: 1958; 68 years ago
- Location: Forestville, Sydney, Australia
- Ground: Melwood Oval
- League: NSWSRU
Team kit

Official website
- forestrugby.com.au

The Forest Rugby Club is an Australian rugby union club in Forestville, New South Wales, established in 1958. It serves the community as a rugby club and supports youth development in The Forest area.

The club now fields junior teams from U6s to U17ss. The senior club has become one of NSW strongest and now fields 6 senior teams in the NSW Suburban Rugby Union 1st Division Kentwell Cup. The Kentwell Cup is the second tier of club Rugby and is a Sydney wide competition.

== History ==
In 1957 the Forest Rugby story began when a small group of men from the Frenchs Forest area, who used to meet for a drink after work in a Chatswood Hotel, decided they would like their sons to play rugby. As there was no organised rugby in the area, one of the fathers Bill Holmes, formed a team of boys to enter the Gordon, Northern Districts competition. The team was coached by Dick Healy and managed by Bill Holmes and Les Cowan.

By 1958 the number of players, officials and supporters increased and it was decided to form a club. The first meeting was held in Soldiers Hall, Forestville on 10 February 1958. The club's colours of Bottle Green and White were chosen. The home ground would be French's Forest Primary School Oval.

Throughout the 60's the club progressed further by drafting and having accepted a constitution, increasing their junior teams to 14 and re-locating to the permanent home ground of The War Memorial Playing Fields, Melwood Oval, Forestville. Notably, in 1966 the club's numbers had grown to 300 with 16 teams being fielded and Peter Sullivan being the first player from the club to be selected to play for NSW (and later went on to captain Australia).

In 1972 the club entered its first team in the Sydney Sub-District Competition where they stayed until 1979 where they were invited to join the newly formed 3rd Division. After several years of playing in the higher division it was decided to return to Sub-District competition in 1982 after difficulty fielding teams in all 4 grades due to the vast amount of traveling involved.

The club has been a centre of community activity throughout the 80's, 90's and into the millennium staging junior rugby training camps, golden oldies tournaments and fierce and competitive local rugby.

== Honours ==
- NSW Suburban Club of the Year: 1998

=== 1st Division ===
- Sutherland Cup (5th Grade): 2000
- Barbour cup (Colts) : 2023

=== 2nd Division ===
- Club Championship: 1989, 1998, 2019
- Barraclough Cup (1st Grade): 1978, 1996, 1998, 2015, 2019
- Stockdale Cup (2nd Grade): 1976, 1988, 1989, 1995, 1997, 1998, 2015, 2018
- Blunt Cup (3rd Grade): 1987, 1995, 1998
- Halligan Cup (5th Grade): 1998
- Robertson Cup (Colts): 2019
- Richardson Cup (4th Grade ): 2025

=== 3rd division ===
- Club Championship: 1983, 1984
- McClean Cup (1st Grade): 1983, 1984
- Grose Cup (2nd Grade): 1984

=== Colts ===
- Sydney Colts Competition (2nd Division): 1980

== Honour Board ==
=== Life Members ===
- 1969 - W Holmes
- 1972 - C Ferguson
- 1973 - H Derwin
- 1975 - Dave Powell
- 1980 - G Hough
- 1982 - Ron Hughes
- 1990 - Dudley Barter
- 1991 - Barry Sullivan
- 1994 - David Dickerson
- 1999 - Alan Astley
- 2000 - Martyn Penny
- 2004 - Mick Herringe

=== Presidents ===
- 1959 - 60: W Holmes
- 1961 - 62: B MacKenzie
- 1963 - 64: C Ferguson
- 1965 - 65: R Oldland
- 1966 - 68: H Derwin
- 1969 - 71: D Powell
- 1972 - 75: G Hough
- 1976 - 77: N Brown
- 1978 - 79: J Goddard
- 1980 - 83: R Hughes
- 1984 - 85: B Manuel
- 1986 - 87: G Armstrong
- 1988 - 95: D Dickerson
- 1996 - 00: M Penny
- 2001 - 03: S Tiatia
- 2004 - 05: S Ledbury
- 2006 - 08: G Allan
- 2009 - 10: D McAndrew
- 2011 - 18: D Dickerson
- 2019 - Current: M Driessen

== See also ==
- New South Wales Suburban Rugby Union
- New South Wales Rugby Union
