= Petersham RUFC =

Australian rugby union club, based in Sydney

(Australia) Petersham
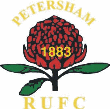
- Full name: Petersham Rugby Union Football Club
- Nickname: Shammies
- Founded: 1883; 143 years ago
- Location: Petersham, Sydney, Australia
- Ground(s): Camperdown Oval, Mallett St, Camperdown
- President: Paul Roseworn
- League: NSWSRU
Team kit

Official website
- www.petershamrugby.com

Petersham Rugby Union Football Club is a rugby union club based in the inner west of Sydney, New South Wales. The club, also known as "The Shammies", currently field 5 teams in the 2nd Grade Division of the New South Wales Suburban Rugby Union competition (Subbies) and a senior women’s X’s team in Joy Johnson cup blue. Petersham RUFC was founded in 1883, making it the oldest surviving suburban rugby club in Australia.

== History ==
=== Early years: 1883–1907 ===
The Sydney rugby institution that is the Petersham Football Club first took to the playing fields in the winter of 1883. At that time, Sydney club rugby was organised on two levels, known simply as Senior and Junior. The Senior club competition had been running since 1874, but Junior contests prior to the mid-1880s were somewhat disorganised. In fact, the Southern Rugby Union (NSWRU) only started involving itself in Junior rugby in 1882, and did not get around to establishing a formal competition for Junior clubs until 1886. By that time Petersham had affiliated to the Union, and was a participant in that first official second-tier competition.

Over the next few years Junior football continued to grow in popularity, and the new competition had to be regularly expanded to accommodate a rapidly increasing number of clubs. Petersham became entrenched at the top level and contested every First Junior competition from 1886 to 1895, winning it in 1889 and making the semi-finals on four other occasions. During this period the club also boasted an impressive role of Junior representative players and supplied a steady stream of quality footballers to the Senior competition. Two of these, Arthur Braund and Rush Nelson, later went on to play many tests for New South Wales and, in the latter case, Queensland.

By the late 1890s however, the Sydney rugby scene was changing. In 1897 a new body, the Metropolitan Rugby Union (MRU), had been formed to oversee the Sydney club competitions. A natural consequence of this was the extinction of a large number of Junior clubs, and indeed by the start of the 1898 season over twenty founding members of the new union, including the entire Fourth Junior competition, had disappeared from its books. Petersham, who had been suffering from a drain of quality players to the Senior competition anyway, was a more significant and probably unintended casualty of this policy.

Fortunately however, the club was strong enough to survive the setback. While most of the Junior clubs disenfranchised by the MRU from 1897 to 1900 simply ceased to exist, a few, including Petersham, continued to play amongst themselves outside the jurisdiction of the MRU and NSWRU. This competition was formalised in 1901 as the City and Suburban Association, the direct ancestor of modern Subbies rugby. Petersham is the only surviving founding member of that competition - the basis of our claim to be Australia's oldest Subbies club! Petersham played in the new competition from 1901 to 1905, winning it in 1904.

In 1906, Petersham followed the example of previous City and Suburban premiers and switched to the MRU's Borough competition, which had been established in 1902 to counter the threat of the new rebel union. Petersham played in the Borough competition for two years, until it was discontinued at the end of the 1907 season. At this time the club ceased operation for the first time since its inception, and there follows a gap of some years before becoming one of the first Sydney clubs to reform after the Great War. This is the only discontinuity in the history of the club.

=== Subbies: 1919–1945 ===
The Petersham club officially returned in 1923, entering and winning the Third Grade competition. While a Petersham team appears in the 1922 first grade competition, this was the 1900 founded Newtown District RUFC playing in their royal blue jerseys under the re-branded name of the Petersham District RUFC (in what became its final season as the NSWRU redistributed its area to other district clubs).

Following the 1923 premiership victory Petersham were elevated to the Reserve Grade B competition. The Kentwell Cup had been presented to the winners of this competition for the first time the previous year, and so began Petersham's long association with that coveted trophy.

In 1929, the New South Wales Rugby Union split its competition in two, forming separate District and Non-District competitions. Petersham stayed with the Non-District competition, which was reconstituted in 1933 as the Metropolitan Sub-District Rugby Union. In 1934 Petersham won the Kentwell Cup for the first time, defeating Roseville in the grand final. At this time the New South Wales Rugby Union was looking fill a vacancy in the District competition, and so dominant were the Petersham and Roseville clubs that it was decided whichever of them won the Kentwell Cup in 1935 should be promoted forthwith. Needless to say the pair met in the grand final once more, but this time Roseville took the honours. They subsequently merged with Chatswood and Gordon to form the Gordon District Rugby Club. Petersham remained in Subbies.

=== Ron McLean patronage: 1946–1992 ===
After the Second World War, Petersham came under the patronage of the famous and mercurial Ron McLean, a veritable legend of Subbies rugby. Ron first pulled on a boot for Petersham in 1935, and later went on to serve as club president and secretary for a total of 47 years. His contributions to the club were manifest, but probably the most significant was the instigation of the famous Petersham World Tour. Petersham had been a touring club since the 1880s, but in 1966 it became the first club side in world rugby history to actually circle the globe on a football tour. The feat has been repeated on numerous occasions since, and the various touring sides have boasted many prominent New South Wales and Australian representative players.

In 1971, the Sydney Sub-District Rugby Union was established and was reorganised over three divisions. Petersham entered the 1st Division, and in 1972 made the Kentwell Cup grand final for the third time, only to lose it to Hunters Hill. However they made up for it with a win over Lindfield in 1973, then backed up to exact vengeance on the black and white hoops in 1974. This side included many top quality players, and is one of only a small number ever to win back to back Kentwells. At the end of 1974 however, an internal dispute saw many of the dual premiership players leave the club, and within two years Petersham had dropped to 3rd Division. Thus began a long period of exile in the lower divisions. This was a tough time for the club, and ultimately saw it on the verge of extinction. However a century of rugby breeds resilience, and tough times seem to bring out the best in Petersham.

=== Modern club: 1993 to present ===
The 1993 season saw both a committee reshuffle and an influx of new players. Over the next couple of years the club progressed steadily, and eventually found itself back up in 3rd Division in 1996. There followed a period of success, winning the Campbell Cup in 1997, the Farrant and Nicholson Cups in 1999 and the Clark, Farrant and joint Campbell Cups in 2000. The latter year also saw the club win the Keith Harris Shield for the 3rd Division club championship and achieve promotion to 2nd Division.

The sojourn in 2nd Division was not as successful as would have been hoped however, as the club gradually lost its recent momentum and started to slide. The period had its highlights, in particular the establishment of a highly successful U21 Colts team, but overall the club failed to live up to expectations. The adventure ultimately came to an end in 2005 after a disastrous run of injuries and plain old bad luck finally took its toll and saw Petersham relegated back to 3rd Division.

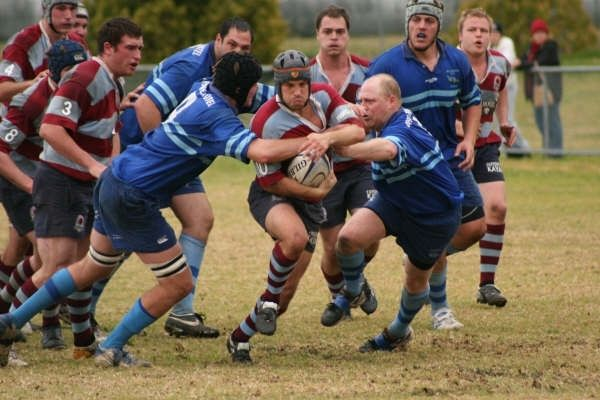
Petersham player in traditional sky blue and maroon jersey runs with the ball in traffic, 2009

2006 was a much more successful year, with the club returning to winning form. 3rd Grade and 4th Grade both made the finals with the 3rd XV subsequently winning the Campbell Cup over Blue Mountains in one of the biggest grand final upsets of 2006. This was followed in 2007 by Farrant and Nicholson Cups.

2008 was celebrated with Petersham Rugby's 125th anniversary. The multitude of off-field events celebrating the club's historic milestone was manifested with success on field with all four grades showcasing in the 3rd division grand finals in poor weather conditions in Sydney. Petersham won the Farrant and Campbell cups that day, however the entire 5 grades celebrated the history of their club.

== Colours ==
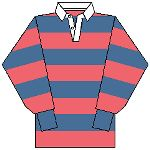
Original colors, 1883

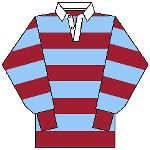
Maroon & light blue, 1929–

The original 19th century colours of the Petersham RUFC are described as "Bismarck and Coral, 4 in. bars".

These colours were used from the club's inception in 1883 up until the disbanding of the Metropolitan Rugby Union Borough Competition at the end of 1907. After the World War I, the club reformed and played initially in Dark Green. This strip was eventually overshadowed by the Myrtle Green of Randwick however, and so when Petersham joined the newly formed New South Wales Rugby Union Non-District Competition in 1929, the colours were changed to the modern "Sky Blue and Maroon, 4 in. bars" in deference to the playing colours of the New South Wales and Queensland Rugby Unions:

Nearly eight decades later, the only other change has been the addition of the famous Waratah flower crest of New South Wales (the only suburban club sanctioned to do so), emblazoned with the club's founding date of 1883.

== Premierships ==
Petersham has won premierships and club championships across multiple competitions since 1889:

NSW Suburban Rugby Union - 1st Division

- 2018 - Kentwell Cup Winners
- 2017 - Kentwell Cup Winners
- 2017 - Club Champions
- 2017 - Barbour Cup Winners

NSW Suburban Rugby Union - 2nd Division

- 2013 - Club Champions
- 2013 - Stockdale Cup Winner
- 2013 - Blunt Cup Winner
- 2025 - Club Champions
- 2025 - Stockdale Cup Winners

NSW Suburban Rugby Union - 3rd Division

- 2009 - 2nd Grade Farrant Cup
- 2008 - 2nd Grade Farrant Cup, 3rd Grade Campbell Cup
- 2007 - 2nd Grade Farrant Cup, 4th Grade Nicholson Cup
- 2006 - 3rd Grade Campbell Cup
- 2000 - Club Champions: Keith Harris Shield, 1st Grade Clark Cup, 2nd Grade Farrant Cup, 3rd Grade Campbell Cup (joint premiers)
- 1999 - 2nd Grade Farrant Cup, 4th Grade Nicholson Cup
- 1997 - 3rd Grade Campbell Cup

Sydney Sub-District Rugby Union - 3rd Division

- 1988 - 3rd Grade Walker Cup
- 1984 - 2nd Grade Farrant Cup

Metropolitan Sub-District Rugby Union

- 1974 - 1st Grade Kentwell Cup
- 1973 - 1st Grade Kentwell Cup, 4th Grade Judd Cup
- 1967 - 2nd Grade Burke Cup
- 1961 - 4th Grade Premiers
- 1956 - 2nd Grade Burke Cup
- 1934 - 1st Grade Kentwell Cup
- 1933 - 2nd Grade Burke Cup

New South Wales Rugby Union

- 1923 - 3rd Grade Premiers

City and Suburban Association

- 1904 - Premiers

Southern Rugby Union

- 1889 - Metropolitan 1st Junior Premiers

== Life members ==
- Brett Conroy
- Marty Davis
- Richard Harvey
- Thomas Jones
- Dave Kelly
- Adam Dunn
- Heath Clark
- Greg Matsin
- Andrew McKinney
- Kent Prusas
- Matthew Robinson
- Paul Stokoe
- Matthew Adams
- Phil Newman

== Representative players ==
The following Petersham players have been selected for representative honours:

New South Wales Suburban Rugby Union

- 2025 Max Lindsey, Bryn Jago, Taylor Phillips, Charlie Kassapian, Stuart Martin, Jonas Cook (U21), Donny Aiono (U21)
- 2007 Dave Sato, Monty Simes (U19)
- 1992 Johnny McCabe

Sydney Sub-District Rugby Union

- 1974 Geoff Foster, Keith Scott, Shayne Wolfe
- 1973 Geoff Foster, Shayne Wolfe
- 1972 Shayne Wolfe

Metropolitan Sub-District Rugby Union

- 1968 Harry Potts

Metropolitan Sub-District Rugby Union Combined Kentwell Cup

- 1934 F. Cowley, J. Jacobs

Southern Rugby Union Combined Junior Competitions

- 1895 T.G. Bate, T.O. Dadswell, G.A. McMahon, E. Newton, C. Oake
- 1894 T.O. Dadswell, H. Faunce, A. Fredericks, W. Perry
- 1893 Crowe Kelk, A.E. Moore, E. Newton, W. Perry
- 1892 H. Blanchard Scouller
- 1891 A. Clarkson, W.C. Kerr, A.E. Moore
- 1890 F. Newman, W. Smith
- 1889 B. Fitzpatrick Lister, R.G. Maiden, H. Nelson, S.J. Simpson

Jack Riley Wallabies (2025)

== Player milestones ==
300 Games

- Marty Davis, Richard Harvey, Dave Kelly, Paul Stokoe, Andrew McKinney, Greg Matsin

200 Games

- Adam Dunn, Matt Robinson, Gerry Schiemer, Danny Zachariou, Alex Major, Paul Lancie-Townes, Lucas Cordingly, Ben Di Qual, Paul Jamison, Michael Ristau, Nick Hearfield, Adam Ritchie, Matthew Travis, Darren Barlow

== Coaching Awards ==
- 2013 NSW Suburban Rugby Union : Coach of the Year : Lord Steve 'Snicks' Nicholls (Petersham, 2nd Division, 1st Grade)
- 2018 NSW Suburban Rugby Union : Coach of the Year : Lord Steve 'Snicks' Nicholls (Petersham, 1st Division, 1st Grade)
- 2019 NSW Suburban Rugby Union : Coach of the Year : Lord Steve 'Snicks' Nicholls (Petersham, 1st Division, 1st Grade)
- 2020 NSW Suburban Rugby Union : Coach of the Year : Lord Steve 'Snicks' Nicholls (Petersham, 1st Division, 1st Grade)
- 2021 NSW Suburban Rugby Union : Coach of the Year : Lord Steve 'Snicks' Nicholls (Petersham, 1st Division, 1st Grade) (Note: First and only man in human history to achieve 4 'NSW Suburban Rugby Union : Coach of the Year' awards consecutively)

== Location ==
Training and home games take place at Camperdown Oval, located between Mallett St and Australia St at Camperdown, just south of Parramatta Rd. The nearest train station is Newtown Station, about a 10-minute walk south down Australia St.

Training takes place on Tuesday and Thursday evenings from 6.30pm. After match and training functions reconvene at sponsor pub The Lady Hampshire, on Parramatta Road.
