= Fotu =

Fotu is a Tongan name. Notable people with this name include:

== Given name ==
- Fotu Auelua, also known as Fotunuupule Auelua, Australian rugby union player
- Fotu Lokotui (born 1992), Tongan rugby union player

== Surname ==
- Isaac Fotu (born 1993), New Zealand basketball player
- Kini Fotu (born 1965), Tongan rugby union player
- Leki Fotu (born 1998), Tongan-American football defensive tackle
- Siaosi Taimani Fotu (died 1967), Tongan politician and magistrate
- Teuila Fotu-Moala, New Zealand rugby league footballer

== See also ==
- Fotu La, India
