= Brothers Rugby Club Sydney =

Australian rugby union club

Brothers
- Full name: Brothers Old Boys Rugby Football Club
- Nickname: Brothers
- Founded: 1947; 79 years ago
- Location: Roseville, Sydney, Australia
- Ground: Roseville Chase Oval
- League: NSWSRU
Team kit

Official website
- www.brothersrugby.com.au

Brothers Rugby Club is an Australian rugby union club that is based in Roseville, a suburb on the North Shore region of Sydney.

Brothers Rugby Club Sydney is an Australian rugby union club based at Roseville Chase Oval on Sydney's North Shore, New South Wales. Established in 1947 by former students of St Pius X College in Chatswood, the club was originally known as Christian Brothers Old Boys (CBOBs). In 2005, it adopted the name Brothers Rugby Club Sydney.

The club competes in the Sydney suburban rugby union competition and has won premierships across several grades. Its activities include senior men's, women's and Colts rugby, alongside social sporting activities.

== History ==
=== Formation and early years (1947–1960s) ===
Brothers Rugby Club Sydney was established in 1947 by former students of Christian Brothers College in Chatswood, which was subsequently renamed St Pius X College. The club was originally known as Christian Brothers Old Boys (CBOBs).

The club was involved in the development of junior rugby union on Sydney's North Shore through the Gordon-Northern Districts Junior Rugby Union competition. Its original playing colours were royal blue and gold, with a gold V on the jersey. The club initially used Beauchamp Park in Chatswood as its home ground, sharing the venue with Chatswood Rugby Club.

The club's published honours list records an Under-19 premiership in 1947 and an undefeated Under-19 premiership, together with the Metropolitan premiership, in 1948.

The club subsequently expanded its participation in senior suburban rugby competitions, establishing a continuing presence in Sydney's sub-district rugby structure.

=== Development and premiership success (1970s–2000s) ===
Brothers continued to compete in Sydney suburban rugby competitions, winning premierships across several grades.

Recorded achievements during this period include the 1970 Judd Cup, the 1974 Stockdale Cup, the 1981 Barraclough Cup, the 1984 and 1986 Stockdale Cups, and the 1990 Barraclough Cup.

The club also won the Clark Cup in 2004.

=== Name change and modern era (2005–2019) ===
In 2005, Christian Brothers Old Boys adopted the name Brothers Rugby Club Sydney. The change reflected the club's connections with the wider Brothers rugby network in Australia and the Marist rugby community internationally.

The club experienced a successful period in the Sydney suburban competition between 2010 and 2014, winning several premierships and club championships.

Its recorded premierships during this period included the Nicholson Cup in 2010, the Grose Cup and McLean Cup in 2011, the Clark Cup in 2012, and the Barraclough Cup in 2013 and 2014. The 2014 Barraclough Cup was shared with Newport.

The club has maintained connections with other Brothers rugby organisations throughout Australia and with the Marist Rugby Federation, which links clubs in countries including New Zealand, Fiji, Tonga and Samoa.

=== Recent history (2020–present) ===
Following the disruption to community sport caused by the COVID-19 pandemic, Brothers continued to develop its rugby program and community activities.

The club's 2025 season update outlined preparations for rebuilding its senior men's, women's and Colts programs ahead of the following season.

The 2026 season marked the club's 80th year, commemorating its establishment in 1947. The club continued to operate senior men's, women's and Colts rugby programs and community sporting activities.

== Club identity and community ==
Brothers has traditionally operated as a community-oriented rugby club, emphasising participation, enjoyment and social connections alongside competitive rugby.

The club represents former students of St Pius X College as well as players from the wider Sydney community. It welcomes players of different abilities and levels of experience.

Through its association with the wider Brothers and Marist rugby networks, the club maintains connections with rugby organisations in Australia and internationally.

== Home ground ==
The club is based at Roseville Chase Oval on Sydney's North Shore. The ground serves as its principal training and home match venue and is used for club activities and community events.

== Premierships ==
The following premierships are recorded in the club's published honours list:

Year	Competition
1947	GNDJRU Under-19
1948	GNDJRU Under-19
1951	Burke Cup
1952	GNDJRU A Grade (Under-21)
1954	GNDJRU A Grade (Under-21)
1957	Anderson Shield – First Grade
1970	Judd Cup
1974	Stockdale Cup
1981	Barraclough Cup
1984	Stockdale Cup
1986	Stockdale Cup
1990	Barraclough Cup
2004	Clark Cup
2010	Nicholson Cup
2011	Grose Cup
2011	McLean Cup
2012	Clark Cup
2013	Barraclough Cup
2014	Barraclough Cup (joint with Newport)

== See also ==
- Rugby union in Australia
- Rugby union in New South Wales
- St Pius X College
