= Taki Toa Shield =

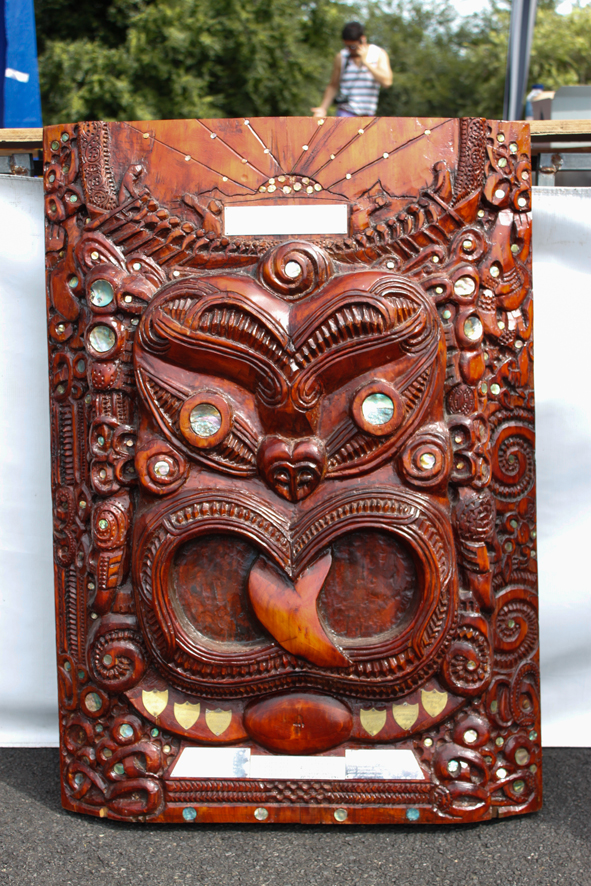
Carved shield for annual Rugby Competition

The Taki Toa Shield is an annual rugby union tournament played among semi-professional clubs and an invitational New Zealand Māori community team in Sydney, Australia. The event also includes a netball tournament, pōwhiri, haka and food stalls.

The shield itself is a perpetual trophy awarded to the winning team, which is then returned the following year. The name Taki Toa is an abbreviation of the Māori phrase, "Te Rōpū Toa o Te Takitini Iwi Maori" meaning "The Brave Group of the Many Māori People".

== History ==
In 1983, due to the growing number of New Zealanders playing rugby in Sydney, a competition was set up in accordance with traditional Māori sports competitions in New Zealand.

The tournament was established by Manukau 'Manu' Nepia Sutherland, a former Waverley Rugby Club player, and other New Zealanders playing rugby in Sydney.

There has been some perception that the tournament has been in decline in recent years, perhaps due to competition with other events such as the Pacific Unity Festival.

== The Shield ==
Manu Sutherland's father Henare carved the shield, which stands over one metre tall and signifies the new migration of Māori and the coming together of Māori and Australians.

=== Carvings ===
The carving at the top of the shield depicts the sun and its far reaching beams. Rising above the horizon are the peaks of Mount Taranaki, Ngauruhoe, Tongariro, Ruapehu and Aoraki / Mount Cook representing New Zealand (Aotearoa) as a whole. The Pacific Ocean (Moana-nui-a-Kiwa) lies between the mountains, with dipping canoes below, indicating space, quest and traditions.

The old spiritual carvings (Takapau) were borrowed from ancient designs, such as the marakihau to lock in the canoes, the seas, the mountains and the guiding stars of the heavens.

One side of the lower phrase shows the genealogical tribal and family signs, and the other shows manaia guarding the central figure and the takarangi designs interlocking the security of the central design.

The series of designs at the bottom edge depict the participation of women in social and recreational events.

=== The central figure ===
The central figure of the carving is depicted with glaring eyes and protruding tongue to accept and give challenge. The distended mouth space gives room for championship medallions. The space below is separated by a football involving the codes being played. The name TAKI TOA RUGBY CHALLENGE SHIELD fills in the space.

At the bottom are four simple adornments indicating the whakataukī "Ngā hau e whā" (literally meaning "The four winds", i.e. North, South, East and West).

== See also ==
- Rugby union in New South Wales
- Rugby union in Australia
- Rugby union in New Zealand
- Māori Australians
