= Lane Cove Rugby =

Australian rugby union club, based in Sydney

Lane Cove Old Ignatians
- Full name: Lane Cove Old Ignatians Rugby Football Club
- Union: Australian Rugby Union
- Founded: 1949; 77 years ago
- Location: Lane Cove, Australia
- Region: New South Wales
- Ground: Tantallon Oval
- League(s): 5th Division; New South Wales Suburban Rugby Union

Official website
- www.lanecoverugby.com.au

Lane Cove Old Ignatians is an Australian rugby union club that participates in the New South Wales Suburban Rugby Union competition. The original Lane Cove Rugby Club (founded in 1949) merged in 2024 with the neighbouring Old Ignatians Rugby Club (founded in 1969). The club is situated in Lane Cove on Sydney's Lower North Shore. The home ground is Tantallon Oval.

The Lane Cove Rugby Club was successful in Sydney Rugby through the 1950s and 1960s and competitive in Division One Sub-Districts into the 1980s with victories including the Under 21 New South Wales State Premiership, the Bruce Graham Shield, Kentwell Cup, Whiddon Cup, Judd Cup trophies among others. Notable players have included Wallabies Ken Yanz and Saxon White, and Kangaroo Greg Florimo. Having been historically a Division One Club, Lane Cove seniors currently plays in New South Wales' Subbies' Division Five, while the thriving Lane Cove Juniors participate in the Gordon Juniors competition.

== Club history ==
=== Early years ===
Lane Cove men began playing regularly at Tantallon Oval in 1949, and in 1950 the club entered a team in the Burke Cup, before amalgamating with Artarmon to form the Lane Cove-Artarmon team. The distinguished New South Wales rugby player and sports administrator J. Darvall-Hunt served as Lane Cove's first Club Patron, with P. Siccard as President. Lane Cove Juniors began in 1951. Lane Cove Lane Cove just missed making the final four in its inaugural year in the Burke Cup competition in 1950, being defeated on averages by the Briars Club for fourth position.

The Club achieved notable successes in Sydney rugby through the 1950s and 1960s. Big name players of these early years included Wallabies Ken Yanz and Saxon White. Ken Yanz began playing in the original Lane Cove-Artarmon juniors in the 1940s and later played for Lane Cove in the Whiddon Cup and Burke Cup. Later selected for Gordon Rugby Club, he became a long-standing player and captain for this Sydney Grade Club and was selected as a Wallaby in 1957. White played Burke Cup for the club in the 1963 season, after his retirement from international rugby.

Lane Cove's juniors enjoyed strong success through the 1950s and their Under 21 side were New South Wales State Champions in 1958 after winning the North Harbour Competition and then defeating the winners of the South Harbour competition.

=== 1960s and 1970s: Sub-Districts success ===
The New South Wales Suburban Rugby Union is affiliated to the New South Wales Rugby Union and runs the competition known as "Subbies" rugby, the major trophy for which is the Kentwell Cup, awarded to the first grade premiers of the first division competition. Lane Cove won the Whiddon Cup in 1965, Kentwell Cup in 1967 and 1968 and Judd Cup in 1968 and 1977. The Club won the Bruce Graham Shield as Division One Club Champions in 1968. Australian rugby league captain Johnny Raper assisted as coach of the 1977 Judd Cup winning side, whose players included advertising magnate John Singleton.

=== Recent years ===
LCRUFC logo 2007–23

While Lane Cove was prominent in Division One rugby through the 1950s and 1960s and competitive into the 1980s, the club no longer competes in Division One. Lane Cove won the Division Five Jeffrey Cup in 1982. In 2006, the club won the Division 4 Club of the Year.

In 2011, the seniors fielded a team in Division Five of the New South Wales Suburban Rugby Union Competition. The Club now has a separately administered Juniors Club. The Juniors have won many competitions through the six decade history of Lane Cove Rugby. They participate in the Gordon Juniors competition, which is responsible for developing Junior Rugby in the Gordon District of Sydney's Northern Suburbs.

In 2012, former player Rob Sinclair commissioned an historical documentary by Theo Clark Media, and a trophy cabinet was opened at The Longueville Sporting Club to celebrate the heritage of Lane Cove Rugby. LCRUFC's two Wallabies Saxon White and Ken Yanz, and Kangaroo Greg Florimo participated in the film and attended the launch.

Lane Cove are part of the player pool for Gordon Rugby Football Club, a leading club in the New South Wales Grade Competition (Shute Shield). A number of Lane Cove players have played Grade rugby for Gordon.

== Jersey and club colours ==
The club colours are white, blue & gold.

For decades, the club was one of the rare rugby clubs that had a V design on the jersey. The blue and gold V on a white jersey was a Lane Cove trademark. The current jersey still uses the blue and gold V design.

== Alliance ==
Lane Cove Rugby shares an alliance with London club, Belsize Park Rugby Football Club. Belsize Park Rugby Football club was one of the founding clubs of the Rugby Football Union in 1871.

== Notable players and coaches ==
Players:

- Ken Yanz – Rugby union international (Wallaby).
- Saxon White – Rugby union international (Wallaby).
- John Singleton (Australian entrepreneur)
- Greg Florimo – Rugby league international (Kangaroo).

Coaches:

- Johnny Raper, Rugby League International (Kangaroo).

== See also ==
- New South Wales Rugby Union
- Australian Rugby Union
- Rugby union in Australia
