= Taimani (surname) =

Taimani is a surname. Notable people with the surname include:

- Siaosi Taimani ʻAho (died 2018), Tongan diplomat
- Siaosi Taimani Fotu (died 1967), Tongan politician
- Taki Taimani (born 1999), American football player
