= New South Wales Suburban Rugby Union =

Australian rugby union organisation

New South Wales Suburban Rugby
Subbies
- Sport: Rugby union
- Founded: 1933; 93 years ago as "Metropolitan S.D.R.U."
- NSWRU affiliation: 1933
- Headquarters: Daceyville, NSW
- Website: rugby.net.au

The New South Wales Suburban Rugby Union, or NSWSRU, is affiliated to the New South Wales Rugby Union and runs the competition affectionately known as "Subbies" rugby.

There are around 7,500 players and 55 clubs competing across 6 divisions, making "Subbies" the largest centrally administered rugby competition in the world. The major trophy in "Subbies" is the Kentwell Cup that is awarded to the first grade premiers of the first division competition. The NSWSRU selects representative sides to compete against New South Wales Country for the Maher-Ross Cup, and Queensland Suburban for the Barraclough Shield.

== History ==
Football under rugby rules began to be played in the 1860s in Sydney's schools. Some of these former students wanted to go on playing and, along with an increasing population of new arrivals in Sydney, this led to the start of club football. After 1872, rugby football clubs grew rapidly in number.

=== The first 'Junior' clubs: 1872 to 1900 ===
Sydney rugby in the early years was played by Senior teams and Junior teams (where Junior denoted the second tier, not the age of the players). The Senior competition was run by the Southern Rugby Union (SRU, later to become the NSWRU) and had been in existence from 1874, but matches for Junior sides were arranged on an ad hoc basis until after the 1885 season. The SRU only began to involve itself in rugby for Junior teams in 1882, and only established a formal Junior competition in 1886.

Some of the clubs in the original Junior competition were Petersham (who still exist in the Suburban competition today), Manly Federals, the Warrigals and Wentworth. Most of these clubs fielded one team and the competition received coverage in Sydney's newspapers under "Other matches". By 1896, in an early sign of what later led to the schism with rugby league, tensions emerged with suggestions that Senior clubs were trying to poach players with talent at Junior clubs using ‘incentives’ and that Junior players were being paid a match fee.

A new branch of the NSWRU called the Metropolitan Rugby Union (MRU) was formed in 1897 to administer the Sydney competitions and re-organise the clubs along district lines. The previous Junior clubs and players were essentially merged into new district clubs. More than twenty Junior clubs, including foundation members of the union, vanished from the books in 1898.

=== City and Suburban Association formed in 1901 ===
Most clubs that were disenfranchised in the move to district football between 1897 and 1900 simply went out of existence but a few, such as Petersham, continued playing matches between themselves beyond the control of the MRU and NSWRU. In 1901 the competition was formally organised under the City and Suburban Association, making it the earliest forerunner of today's Subbies rugby.

To counter this new rebel association, the MRU created its own Borough competition in 1902. Several of the leading City and Suburban clubs switched to this competition but, with the start of rugby league in 1908, it did not continue. With the advent of the Great War in 1914, most rugby union clubs ceased playing altogether and rugby league had won ascendancy in New South Wales.

=== Post-war reformation in 1919 ===
After the war was ended, the NSWRU established one competition for the 1919 season with divisions for both non-district and district clubs. The Mosman Rugby Club, as the winner of the Reserve Grade B division (effectively the first grade for non-district clubs), was presented with a cup donated by W.H. Kentwell in 1923. This began the long history of the Kentwell Cup which is now awarded to the NSWSRU first grade premiers in first division. The Burke Cup, was first presented to the Mosman club's second grade winning side in 1924 by James A. Burke, and is now contested by NSWSRU second grade teams in first division.

=== Sub-Districts Rugby Union ===
The NSWRU formed a separate non-district club competition in 1929, which became the Metropolitan Sub-Districts Rugby Union in 1933. The Whiddon Cup was inaugurated in 1933 by Horace Whiddon of the Briars Club, and is now awarded to the NSWSRU third grade premiers.

At the start of the war in 1939 the NSWRU decided to cancel representative games but continue with club competitions. This was an attempt to ward off a repeat of the setback caused by the cessation of rugby during the previous war. All sports were ravaged during the war. Players and officials died or were injured during battle or as prisoners of war but, as at least a restricted form of the game was continued, rugby union was able to be successfully revived in 1946.

After the war, Subbies rugby grew strongly. In 1966 Petersham made history as being the first club to circle the world on a rugby tour. The Sydney Sub-Districts Rugby Union was established in 1971, and the Subbies competition was rearranged into three divisions.

=== New South Wales Suburban Rugby Union ===
In 1990, the Subbies became known as the New South Wales Suburban Rugby Union. The second division of the Sydney district competition was absorbed into Subbies in 1993 and 18 clubs contested the Kentwell Cup in that year. Drummoyne, Mosman, University of NSW and Hornsby, Hawkesbury Agricultural College, Canterbury, Dundas Valley, Hawkesbury Valley are former district clubs that moved to Subbies.

Most current clubs are based on a local community, links with schools, or voluntary groups. Old Ignatians, St Patricks, Barker Old Boys, Knox Rugby Club, Waverley, Kings Old Boys, and Oakhill are or were formed from ex-students of schools. The Bronte and Manly Savers clubs are composed of members of surf lifesaving clubs.

Promotion and relegation is based on club championship results down to third division.

== Recent events ==
There have been problems in recent years fielding a 4th Division competition (clubs with 3 grade teams). 4th Division was disbanded after the 2008 season, where only six clubs participated, and was further weakened with the withdrawal of two of the 3rd grade teams. The 4th Division was resurrected in 2011, again with six clubs, but again was afflicted with the withdrawal of two 3rd grade teams, although a Halligan Cup team – Colleagues Convicts – stepped up into the grade. In 2012 the season was played without a 4th division competition again.

The 4th Division competition was revived in 2014, but with it came the demise of the 5th Division (clubs with 2 teams). This means that clubs who were hoping to have 2 teams this year must either downsize to one team (Division 6) or hope for a 3rd grade team and push for the revived Division 4, making clubs either make players miss out on playing if unable to find a Halligan Cup fixture (lack of a 2nd grade) or trying to create a 3rd grade (possibly making players play 2 or more games of rugby).

== Trophies ==
Cross Divisional

- Champion Club – Cowboy Cup

Cowboy Cup is competed by every team in Suburban Rugby. Each team, including Halligan Cup and Radford Cup competitions which are not included within divisional club championship competitions, earns points for the club. The winner of the Cowboy Cup is the club across all divisions who earn the most points throughout the season.

First Division

- Club Champion – Bruce Graham Shield
- 1st grade – Kentwell Cup
- 2nd grade – Burke Cup
- 3rd grade – Whiddon Cup
- 4th grade – Judd Cup
- 5th grade – Sutherland Cup
- Colts – Barbour Cup

Second Division

- Club Champion – Reliance Shield
- 1st grade – Barraclough Cup
- 2nd grade – Stockdale Cup
- 3rd grade – Blunt Cup
- 4th grade – Richardson Cup
- Colts – Robertson Cup

Third Division

- Club Champion – Harris Shield
- 1st grade – Clark Cup
- 2nd grade – Farrant Cup
- Colts – Nicholson Cup (prior to 2017, Nicholson Cup was contested by 3rd Division 4th Grade)

Fourth Division

- Club Champion – Herlihy Shield
- 1st grade – Jeffrey Cup
- Colts – Radfield Cup

Fifth Division – reinstated 2017 after a four season absence

- 1st grade – McLean Cup
- 2nd grade – Grose Cup

Sixth Division

- 1st grade – Meldrum Cup

Additional Cups

- Halligan Cup – contested between extra teams (e.g. 2nd or 3rd Division 5th grade), organised by the clubs themselves. The winner is the leading team after the final round of Division 1. During 2012, 19 clubs took part in Halligan Cup fixtures.
- Radford Cup – contested by 1st grade colts teams from 4th division and below, but is open to second grade colts teams from 1st and 2nd division clubs. In addition, it is open to Premiership clubs who have additional colts.
- Under 85 kg Cup – mid-week competition played between teams where all players are 85 kg or less. The competition was played between 6 teams in 2012, but has not been contested since then.
- Rugby Club Cup – contested between Under 19's teams associated with Suburban and Premiership clubs. Has not been played since 2007.

== Clubs ==
For the 2026 season, clubs compete in the following divisions:

First Division (8)

Blue Mountains
Colleagues
Drummoyne
Hunters Hill
Lindfield
Mosman
Petersham
Waverley

Second Division (6)

Briars
Forest
Newport
St Patrick's
Sydney Irish
University of NSW

Third Division (6)

Beecroft
Hornsby
Knox
Lane Cove Old Ignatians
Renegades Rugby
Wakehurst/Old Barker

Fourth Division (10)

Balmain
Brothers
Chatswood
Kings Rugby
Macquarie Uni
Manly Savers
North Cronulla
Redfield Old Boys
St Ives
Sydney Convicts

Fifth Division (12)

Blacktown
Canterbury
Chifley Chiefs
Epping
Georges River
Hawkesbury Valley
Hills
Merrylands
Oatley
Penrith
Sydney Harlequins
Sydney Harbour

Halligan Cup

To be confirmed

== Representative team ==
NSW Subbies kit

A representative NSW Suburban team is selected from players within the competition to play against other amateur representative sides. The Maher-Ross Cup is contested by NSW Suburban and NSW Country, and the Barraclough Shield is awarded to the winner of the interstate match between the NSW Suburban and Queensland Suburban teams. The Barraclough Shield was contested annually from 1966, until 2016.

== See also ==
- Rugby union in New South Wales
- List of Australian club rugby union competitions

== Bibliography ==
- Hickie, Tom V: The Game for the Game Itself!: The Development of Sub-District Rugby in Sydney, (1983) Sydney Sub-District Rugby Union. ISBN 978-0959194104
- Horton, Peter (2009). "Rugby Union Football in the Land of the Wallabies, 1874–1949: same game, different ethos" (PDF). The International Journal of the History of Sport. 26 (11): 1611–1629. doi:10.1080/09523360903169925. Archived from the original on 7 April 2016.
- Mulford, John G: Guardians of the Game: The History of the New South Wales Rugby Union 1874-2004. (2005) ABC Books. ISBN 0-7333-1625-5
- Pollard, Jack: Australian Rugby: The game and the players. (1994) Pan Macmillan. ISBN 0-330-35619-4
