= St Patrick's Rugby Club =

Australian rugby union club, based in Strathfield, NSW

St Patrick's
- Full name: St Patrick's Rugby Club
- Founded: 1964; 62 years ago
- Location: Strathfield, Sydney
- Ground(s): Hudson Park, Homebush
- League: NSWSRU
1st kit	2nd kit

Official website
- www.sprc.com.au

St Patrick's Rugby Club, also known as St Pats, is a rugby union club based in Strathfield, New South Wales. The club, formerly known as St Patrick's Old Boys, currently field six teams in the second division of the NSW Suburban competition, known as "Subbies". St Pats was formed in 1964 and since their elevation to first division had not been relegated until 2017. The club was formed by ex-students of St Patrick's College, Strathfield but now has members from various backgrounds including a number of international players.

== History ==
The club was founded in 1964, but initially played rugby league. After St Patrick's College changed to being a rugby union school in 1965, St Pats Rugby Club fielded an under 20s rugby union side in the Western Sydney Junior competition in 1966.

The club had expanded to field three teams by 1969, with two sides playing in the NSW Subbies second division. John O’Rourke was the coach. Because Knox Rugby Club also played in black, St Pats made a jersey change to include gold hoops. The club added a fourth team in 1971 as the competition expanded, but was still training at St Patrick's College during those years.

St Pats won the Club division two championship in 1973 (as well as the C.W. Blunt Cup for the second grade premiership) and gained promotion to play in Subbies division one for the following season. The club's training location was moved to Ashfield Centenary Sports Ground in 1974 and the Illinois Hotel was the de facto clubhouse. The black jersey with a gold collar (as used by St Patrick's College) was adopted in 1979.

In 1980, the club moved home ground again, this time to Hudson Park and a new clubhouse was built and opened the following year. Field lighting was installed in the 1990s and upgraded in 2005 to allow night matches to be played. The St Pats club currently fields six teams in the NSW Subbies competition .

== Premierships ==
The club has won twenty six premierships across various grades. The Kentwell Cup trophy has been won on four occasions; in 1975 – coached by Don Loughry, in 1993 – coached by Paul Donnellan, in 2013 – shared with Balmain after a 33-all extra-time draw, and in 2014 after a 40–5 trouncing of Drummoyne

- 2020 Robertson Cup
- 2018 Robertson Cup
- 2014 Kentwell Cup
- 2013 Kentwell Cup (Note: 2013 joint winners St Patrick's and Balmain.)
- 2013 Judd Cup
- 2012 Burke Cup
- 2011 Barbour Cup
- 2010 Burke Cup
- 2001 Judd Cup
- 2000 Whiddon Cup
- 2000 Judd Cup
- 1999 Whiddon Cup
- 1999 Judd Cup
- 1998 Sutherland Cup
- 1998 Burke Cup
- 1997 Whiddon Cup
- 1996 Barbour Cup
- 1995 Burke Cup
- 1994 Burke Cup
- 1993 Kentwell Cup
- 1989 Whiddon Cup
- 1988 Whiddon Cup
- 1985 Whiddon Cup
- 1976 Whiddon Cup
- 1976 Judd Cup
- 1975 Kentwell Cup
- 1973 Blunt Cup
- 1969 Under 20s

== Club Championships ==
St Patrick's has won the Club Championship Trophy on six occasions. The Second Division "Reliance Shield" in 1973, and the Club Championship in the First Division in 1976, 1994, 1996, 1998, 2013, and 2014.

The club also won the interdivisional championship, known as the Cowboy Cup, in 2013.

== Notable players ==
- Steve Devine – St Pat's Best and Fairest (1989), Australia 7s (1998), All Blacks (2002–03).

Don Burke of Burke's Backyard fame was a former first grade coach at the club.
