= Kentwell Cup =

Australian rugby union tournament in NSW

- Organiser(s): NSWSRU
- Founded: 1923; 103 years ago
- Region: New South Wales
- Teams: 8
- Current champions: Hunters Hill (9 titles)
- Most championships: Colleagues (16 titles)

The Kentwell Cup is the major trophy for the New South Wales Suburban Rugby Union (NSWSRU), colloquially known as the "Subbies" competition. It is awarded to the first grade premiers of the first division competition.

The Kentwell Cup was originally presented by W.H. Kentwell, president of the Mosman Rugby Club in 1923 and is still presented to the first grade premiers in first division. The first winners of the Kentwell Cup out of a field of eight was Mosman.

Teams that have played in the competition include those linked by geographical location, such as Drummoyne DRFC, Lane Cove RUFC, and Petersham RUFC; some are linked by connections to schools, such as Old Ignatians, Newington Old Boys (NOBs), St Patrick's Rugby Club and Knox Old Boys; while others have been linked by occupation, like Fire Brigades, Royal Australian Artillery, CBC Bank and Bondi Life Savers.

== Premiers ==
List of Kentwell Cup Premiers since 1923:

Year	Premiers
2025	Hunters Hill (Note: Undefeated Season)
2024	Blue Mountains
2023	Blue Mountains
2022	Colleagues
2021	Season cancelled
2020	Drummoyne
2019	Mosman
2018	Petersham
2017	Petersham
2016	Mosman
2015	Balmain
2014	St Patrick's
2013	St Patrick's & Balmain (Note: 2013 joint winners Balmain and St Patrick's.)
2012	Drummoyne
2011	Colleagues
2010	Drummoyne
2009	Knox Old Boys
2008	Drummoyne
2007	Drummoyne
2006	Drummoyne
2005	Knox Old Boys
2004	Drummoyne
2003	Dundas Valley
2002	Old Ignatians
2001	St Ives
2000	Drummoyne
1999	Newport
1998	University NSW
1997	Hunters Hill
1996	Colleagues
1995	Hunters Hill
1994	University NSW
1993	St Patrick's
1992	St Leos
1991	Waverley & Matraville (Note: 1991 joint winners Matraville and Waverley.)
1990	Waverley
1989	Waverley

Year	Premiers
1988	Matraville
1987	Hunters Hill
1986	Matraville
1985	Matraville
1984	Colleagues
1983	Bronte
1982	Colleagues
1981	Hunters Hill
1980	Colleagues
1979	Hunters Hill
1978	Hunters Hill
1977	Hunters Hill (Note: Undefeated Season)
1976	St Ives
1975	St Patrick's
1974	Petersham
1973	Petersham
1972	Hunters Hill
1971	Bondi Savers
1970	Colleagues
1969	Newington Old Boys
1968	Lane Cove
1967	Lane Cove
1966	Colleagues
1965	Briars
1964	Briars
1963	Colleagues
1962	Colleagues
1961	University NSW
1960	Colleagues
1959	Colleagues
1958	Western Suburbs
1957	Colleagues
1956	Western Suburbs

Year	Premiers
1955	Colleagues
1954	Mosman
1953	Western Suburbs
1952	Briars
1951	Moore Park
1950	Colleagues
1949	Briars
1948	Concord West
1947	Drummoyne
1946	Epping
1945	Not Contested
1944	Not Contested
1943	Not Contested
1942	Not Contested
1941	Colleagues
1940	Briars
1939	Bondi Savers & Artillery (Note: 1939 joint winners Bondi Savers & Royal Australian Artillery)
1938	Fire Brigades
1937	Bondi Savers
1936	North Steyne
1935	Roseville
1934	Petersham
1933	Coogee
1932	Waverley
1931	Coogee
1930	Fire Brigade
1929	North Steyne
1928	Manly Life Savers
1927	Mosman
1926	Coogee
1925	Coogee
1924	Manly Life Savers
1923	Mosman

Notes

Summary of Kentwell Cup Premierships since 1923:

Premierships	Club
16	Colleagues
9	Hunters Hill
9	Drummoyne
5	Briars
5	Mosman
5	Petersham
4	Coogee
4	Matraville
4	St Patrick's
4	Waverley
3	Bondi Savers

Premierships	Club
3	University NSW
3	Western Suburbs
2	Blue Mountains
2	Fire Brigade
2	Knox Old Boys
2	Lane Cove
2	Manly Life Savers
2	North Steyne
2	St Ives
2	Balmain
1	Bronte

Premierships	Club
1	Concord West
1	Dundas Valley
1	Epping
1	Moore Park
1	Newington Old Boys
1	Newport
1	Old Ignatians
1	Roseville
1	St Leo's
1	Artillery

== See also ==
- Rugby union in New South Wales
- List of Australian club rugby union competitions
