= New South Wales Country Cockatoos =

Australian rugby union club, based in NSW

(Australia) New South Wales Country
- Union: New South Wales Rugby Union
- Branch: NSW Country Rugby Union
- Founded: 1895 (NSW Country team) 1996 (NSW Country Cockatoos)
- Region: NSW, excl. Sydney & Southern Regions
- League: NCR Div.2
- 2019: Runner-up
Team kit

The New South Wales Country Cockatoos is an amateur representative rugby union football team. Players in the team are selected by the New South Wales Country Rugby Union from regions of New South Wales excluding Sydney and Southern NSW. New South Wales Country plays regular fixtures with other representative sides including City-Country matches with New South Wales Suburban for the Maher-Ross Cup, and the "Battle of the Borders" Cup against the Queensland Country Heelers.

The NSW Country team adopted a logo featuring a Cockatoo in 1996. These native birds are common throughout regional areas of New South Wales. The team colours are orange (amber) and black.

== NSW Country Under 20 ==
The New South Wales Country Under 20 team competes in the Southern States Championship and also plays occasional matches against other representative sides. Prior to 2008, country colts teams at under 21 and under 19 age levels were fielded in national and state competitions.

== History ==
=== Early Years: 1895 to 1949 ===
The New South Wales Country team first played the Metropolitan Sydney side when the New South Wales Rugby Union inaugurated the Country Week carnivals in 1895. Sydney won in the first two years by 14–11 and 23–8, but in 1897 the Country team won by 16–3. The Country Week matches continued until 1914 with just two drought-affected years missed.

The onset of the First World War in 1914, and the growth of rugby league brought rugby union to a halt in New South Wales. Rugby league took many of the ground tenures and, as the only football code played during the war, the majority of young men that left school. Although rugby union survived, the game languished in country parts of the state for many decades.

Country Week matches were re-established in 1929, after a 15-year gap. New Zealand's All Blacks also toured in 1929, playing the NSW Country team in Armidale and winning 27–8. However, the 1930s Depression years had a debilitating effect on amateur sports including rugby, particularly in country areas with reduced prices for rural products. At the outset of the Second World War, the NSWRU decided that some club rugby would be maintained. A few matches were arranged and country teams managed their own games of mostly reserve team fixtures. Schoolboy matches were played, but representative rugby was discontinued.

=== Expansion and tours: 1950 to 1999 ===
Rugby union in country regions of NSW expanded in the 1950s and 1960s. The NSW Country Rugby Union was founded in 1954. The NSW Country team defeated Sydney 17–8 in 1956, and lost to the touring South Africa by six points. The team drew 14–all with the Queensland Country team before playing a 16–all draw with Queensland in 1964.

The 1970s was a golden period. NSW Country won the Wallaby Trophy in 1970. Under innovative coach Daryl Haberecht they won again in 1974 (beating Sydney, Queensland and Victoria), and again in 1975 (being undefeated). NSW Country also won matches against the England and Japan touring sides in 1975. The team undertook tours to New Zealand, Canada and the United States in 1974 and again in 1977, winning 13 from 15 matches and 7 from 13 matches respectively, including wins over Waikato and Counties in New Zealand.

Periods of drought affected Country rugby in the early 1980s, but the NSW Country team toured New Zealand in 1980 and 1981, and United Kingdom and Europe in 1985. The Cockatoos name was adopted in 1996. The team toured to Ceylon in 1997, winning the Singer Cup when in Colombo.

=== Recent events: 2000 to present ===
The Australian Rugby Union started the Australian Rugby Shield competition in 2000, which NSW Country won four times; in 2001, 2002, 2004, and 2008. After the suspension of the competition at the end of 2008, the focus of the NSW Country Cockatoos returned to annual City-Country fixtures against NSW Suburban, and the "Battle of the Borders" Cup against the Queensland Country Heelers. The Cockatoos won the cup in five of the seven years to 2013. From 2019 the team participates in National Rugby Championship Division 2.

=== Honours ===
- 2019 NRC Division 2 Runner Up
- Australian Rugby Shield Winners (2001, 2002, 2004, 2008)

== See also ==
- Rugby union in New South Wales
- 2001 British & Irish Lions tour to Australia
