= Old Ignatians' Rugby Football Club =

Australian rugby union club, based in Sydney, NSW

Old Ignatians'
- Full name: Old Ignatians Rugby Club
- Union: Australian Rugby Union
- Nickname(s): Iggies, Redmen
- Founded: 1969; 57 years ago
- Location: Sydney, Australia
- Region: New South Wales
- Ground: Ryde Oval
Team kit

The Old Ignatians' Rugby Football Club was a rugby union club based in Sydney, Australia that merged with neighbouring Subbies club Lane Cove in 2024 to form the Lane Cove Old Ignatians.

== History ==
The Old Ignatians' Rugby Football Club was founded in 1969. The club was founded by and is associated with, the Old Ignatian's Union, the ex-students association of Saint Ignatius' College, Riverview, a Jesuit school for boys, established in 1880 and located on Sydney's lower North Shore. The school has been an active participant in the Athletic Association of the Great Public Schools of New South Wales, which has one of the oldest rugby competitions in Australia. The club won the New South Wales Suburban Rugby Union competition's Division One trophy, the Kentwell Cup in 2002. The club has also won a number of other Division One trophies, including Burke Cup in 2003 and 1999.

== Club colours and home ground ==
The club colours are red, white and blue and the home ground is at Ryde Oval.

== Premierships ==
Old Ignatians' Rugby Football Club Premierships
YEAR	DIVISION	CUP	GRADE	VENUE	OPPOSITION	FOR	AGAINST
1974	Second	Blunt	3	Drummoyne Oval	Tobians	18	3
1978	Sixth	Meldrum	1	TG Millner #2	Rockdale	15	6
1979	Fourth	Jeffrey	1	Hassall Park	CBC Bank	13	8
1986	Third	Grose	2	Wills Ground	Willoughby	12	12
1987	Third	McLean	1	Macquarie University	Sydney Welsh	13	6
1988	Second	Barraclough	1	Macquarie University	Knox Old Boys	19	6
1995	Second	Richardson	4	Rat Park	Matraville	6	3
1996	Second	Blunt	3	Macquarie University	Briars	23	5
1996	Second	Richardson	4	Macquarie University	Matraville	8	5
1996	Open	Halligan	5	N/A	First Past The Post		
1996	Second	Robertson	C	Macquarie University	Oatley	25	7
1997	Open	Halligan	6	N/A	First Past The Post		
1997	First	Judd	4	Waratah Stadium	Waverley	8	5
1998	First	Whiddon	3	Waratah Stadium	UNSW	24	17
1999	First	Burke	2	Waratah Stadium	Mosman	13	11
1999	First	Sutherland	5	Macquarie University	Newport	15	0
2000	First	Barbour	C	David Phillips Field	Hunters Hill	11	11
2001	First	Burke	2	TG Millner	St Patricks Old Boys	34	10
2001	First	Sutherland	5	TG Millner	Drummoyne	8	3
2001	First	Barbour	C	TG Millner #2	Mosman	24	5
2002	First	Kentwell	1	Wentworth Park	Drummoyne	23	14
2002	First	Whiddon	3	Wentworth Park	Colleagues	15	3
2002	First	Judd	4	Wentworth Park	Colleagues	24	0
2003	First	Burke	2	Wentworth Park	Colleagues	27	7
2003	First	Judd	4	Wentworth Park	Colleagues	11	7
2003	First	Sutherland	5	Wentworth Park	Colleagues	12	6
2004	First	Judd	4	TG Millner	Colleagues	15	14
2004	First	Sutherland	5	TG Millner	Colleagues	14	0
2005	First	Judd	4	TG Millner	Colleagues	12	6
2005	First	Sutherland	5	TG Millner	Drummoyne	8	0
2006	Open	Halligan	6	N/A	First Past The Post		
2006	First	Judd	4	TG Millner	Drummoyne	22	10
2006	First	Sutherland	5	TG Millner	Drummoyne	27	0
2008	First	Judd	4	TG Millner	Campbelltown	23	21
2008	First	Sutherland	5	TG Millner	UNSW	18	3
2008	First	Barbour	C	TG Millner	Colleagues	24	21
2009	First	Judd	4	TG Millner	Mosman	57	7
2010	First	Barbour	C	TG Millner	Mosman	25	10
2013	First	Sutherland	5	TG Millner	Colleagues	23	0
2014	First	Barbour	C	TG Millner	Mosman	47	35
2017	Third	Farrant	2	TG Millner	Newport	17	10
2020	Third	Campbell	3	Macquarie University	Newport	18	7

== Life Members ==
No: 1 Peter Ryan, inducted 1991

No: 2 Les Kirkpatrick, inducted 1992

No: 3 Mark Richards, inducted 1992

No: 4 John Bain, inducted 1993

No: 5 Dr Terry Horgan, inducted 1994

No: 6 Richard Mort, inducted 1998

No: 7 Joe Brown, inducted 1999

No: 8 Paul Timmins, inducted 1999

No: 9 Tim Richards, inducted 2003

No: 10 Michael Fahey, inducted 2004

No: 11 Damian Peppitt, inducted 2007

No: 12 Charles Perrignon, inducted 2009

No: 13 Matthew Perrignon, inducted 2009

No: 14 Dave Bryant, inducted 2013

No: 15 Guy Coleman, inducted 2013

No: 16 Gerard Hogan, inducted 2017

No: 17 Peter Cahill, inducted 2019

No: 18 Dominic Lombardo, inducted 2019

== Notable players ==
- John Tighe – Italy (2009), OIRFC club captain (2007), Judd Cup premiership captain (2009)
- Mickey Palmer - Sydney (2002)3rd grade “Whiddon cup” premier, (2003) 2nd grade “Burke cup” premier, (2006 - 2015) colts coach - premiers Barbour cup (2008, 2010, 2014)

== See also ==
- Rugby union in New South Wales
- List of Riverview Old Ignatians
