= Wallaroo FC =

Rugby Union Football club

Wallaroo Rugby
- Full name: Wallaroo Football Club
- Nickname: The Marsupials
- Founded: 1870
- Ground: Sydney Cricket Ground
- Last season: 1899 Sydney first grade
Home colours

Wallaroo Football Club is a former rugby union club based at Moore Park in Sydney, Australia. Founded in May 1870, it is historically recognised as "Australia's original rugby club" and the first football club in the country to formally adopt rugby rules at its inaugural meeting. Prior to Wallaroo's establishment, club football in Sydney lacked unified rules, frequently operating under informal combinations of Victorian rules or shifting captaincy agreements. Wallaroo is recognised as playing the leading role in the development of the rugby union code in New South Wales (NSW) and Queensland over the last quarter of the nineteenth century and the creation of the Southern Rugby Football Union (the NSWRU) in 1874. In honour of the Wallaroo FC as the first club to adopt rugby rules, Rugby Australia in 1994 named the Australian women's rugby team the "Wallaroos".

== History ==
The Wallaroo club was a membership-based football club founded at a meeting in Sydney in May 1870 held by William 'Monty' Arnold, Richard Arnold, George Deas-Thomson, Tom Brown and Septimus Stephen. The decision was made at the meeting for the club to only play by the football rules of rugby, which were subsequently published by the club and circulated to the Sydney University FC and others.

Wallaroo played their first match on 18 June 1870 at the Military and Civil Cricket Ground (now Sydney Cricket Ground) against a combined team of British 'Army & Navy' officers and men, in what was the first contemporary newspaper documented game played under rugby rules in Australia.In July 1871 the club played the first 15-a-side rugby game in Australia when they met a team of citizen-soldiers from the No.10 Battery of Volunteer Artillery. To actively foster the expansion of the code via new clubs, in 1872 Wallaroo intentionally capped its membership to 50 players, and formed a second XV to provide new clubs with a regular opponent.

Wallaroo FC consolidated its status as Sydney's guiding rugby influence during the 1870s, serving as a vital anchor for the development of the sport in Australia. In June 1874 the club's officials played the lead organising role in the creation of the NSWRU and ensuring the adoption without amendment of the football rules of England's Rugby Football Union (RFU).

Throughout the 1880s and 1890s, the "Marsupials" functioned as the primary source of representative talent, with Wallaroo men consistently filling the NSW team (now Waratahs) for early inter-colonial and international fixtures against Queensland (Reds), New Zealand (All Blacks), Victoria and Great Britain (British Lions). The club holds the elite historical distinction of producing both the very first Waratahs captain James Brodie in 1882, and first Australian (now Wallabies) captain Frank Row in 1899. While studying law at Oxford University, Wallaroo player Charles Wade was capped eight times for England over 1882 to 1886.

At club football level Wallaroo was the most successful club prior to the start of the twentieth century, securing a total of 13 premiership titles, ahead of their traditional rivals Sydney University FC with nine. The club captured its final major senior premiership title (now Shute Shield) in 1899, with the competition called off early due to their unassailable lead on the points table.

However, after the 1899 season, decade-long concerns about the strength of the member-based clubs in Sydney gave rise to the introduction by the Metropolitan Rugby Union (under the NSWRU) of a "District Scheme" which restricted club eligibility strictly to the geographic areas where players lived. Introduced just prior to the start of the 1900 football season, this abruptly left Wallaroo FC out of the first grade competition and effectively defunct, despite being Sydney's reigning premiers.

== Colours and mascot ==
The Wallaroo club initially played in various colours, including red, white and blue hoops in 1872-74, the first tricolours jersey used in Australia in any football code. In 1876 the club permanently settled upon a tricolour jersey design of black, crimson and gold hoops in the same style as Richmond FC in England.The Australian common wallaroo marsupial was the source of the club name and the cap emblem mascot.

== Grounds ==
The Wallaroo club played the majority of its Sydney games at the various grounds within the Moore Park precinct including the Moore Park West open fields, Sydney Cricket Ground and Sydney Showground.

== Legacy ==
=== National teams nicknames ===
In 1908 proposals put forward for a possible nickname for the Australian men's team included "the Wallaroos" alongside "the Waratahs" and others, however a vote of the players decided upon "the Wallabies". In recognition of the Wallaroo club's pioneering role in shaping Australian rugby history, in 1994 the Australian women's team was officially named the "Wallaroos" by the Australian RFU (now Rugby Australia).This enduring legacy ensures that the historic moniker of Sydney's earliest rugby powerhouse continues to be represented on the modern international stage.

=== Whistle (referee) ===
On 15 August 1883, current Wallaroo FC and NSWRU official W. ('Monty') Arnold was the first referee in the world to control a rugby game with a whistle, in a match at Eagle Farm Racecourse in Brisbane between NSW (now Waratahs) and Queensland (now Reds). The RFU mandated the use of the whistle by rugby referees late in 1885, effectively coming into universal operation in 1886.

=== Namesake clubs ===
The prestige of the original Sydney club inspired the formation of numerous namesake clubs across NSW and Queensland during the late 19th and early 20th centuries. In Queensland, Brisbane's Wallaroo FC was founded in 1879 initially playing Victorian rules before transitioning exclusively to rugby in 1885 and playing a pivotal role in establishing the code. Another prominent Queensland namesake was formed in Maryborough in 1893 and then switched to rugby league in 1910, and as the Maryborough Wallaroos remain today as the only surviving club to have adopted the moniker while the original Sydney club was still competing. In NSW, a prominent Wallaroo FC was established in Goulburn in 1890, remaining a major local side until 1913. Other regional rugby clubs also adopted the Wallaroo name, including clubs in Wickham (c. 1888), Rockhampton (c. 1889), Dumaresq (c. 1895), Newcastle (c. 1900), Lithgow (c. 1902), Roma (c. 1906), Broken Hill (c. 1907), Orange (c. 1912), and Braidwood (c. 1913). By contrast, the Australian rules club currently known as Wallaroo FC in South Australia was until 1880 the Wallaroo Bay FC, taking its name from the Wallaroo area (which is not derived from the wallaroo marsupial).

=== NSW Waratahs badge ===
In 1895, Wallaroo FC co-founder and current official Richard Arnold successfully lobbied the NSWRU to adopt a red waratah flower badge for the NSW team jerseys. The waratah has remained the team's badge and emblem ever since and in 1991 became known as the NSW Waratahs.

=== Australian Wallabies records ===
In the inaugural Australian Test series against the 1899 British Lions touring team, Wallaroo FC supplied seven players across the four matches, setting a record that remains the highest number from any single club in a Wallabies home series, one more than six from Brisbane's Brothers Rugby Club in 1914. In the opening Test match the club also provided the first Australian Test captain, Frank Row, the first Australian Test try-scorer (Alfred Kelly) and the first place-kicked goal (Stephen Spragg).
