= Andrew Kellaway (rugby union) =

Australia international rugby union player

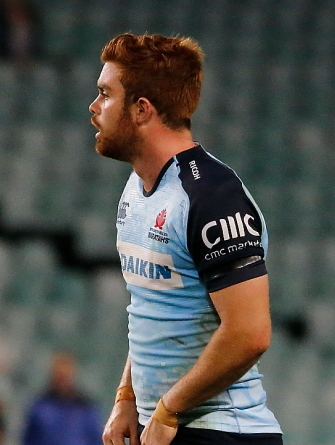
- Kellaway with the Waratahs in 2017
- Full name: Andrew John Kellaway
- Born: 12 October 1995 (age 31) Sydney, New South Wales, Australia
- Height: 1.86 m (6 ft 1 in)
- Weight: 94 kg (207 lb; 14 st 11 lb)
- School: The Scots College

Rugby union career
- Position(s): Fullback, Wing, Centre
Youth career
- Hunters Hill Rugby Club
Amateur team(s)
Years	Team	Apps	(Points)
2014–2018	Randwick	36	(145)
- Correct as of 16 July 2022
Senior career
Years	Team	Apps	(Points)
2014–2017	NSW Country Eagles	28	(80)
2016–2018	Waratahs	22	(15)
2018–2019	Northampton Saints	18	(20)
2019	Counties Manukau	10	(0)
2020–2024	Rebels	50	(90)
2021	Green Rockets Tokatsu	4	(5)
2025–2026	Waratahs	20	(25)
- Correct as of 30 May 2026
International career
Years	Team	Apps	(Points)
2012–2013	Australia Schoolboys	8	(0)
2014–2015	Australia U20s	12	(70)
2021–2025	Australia	49	(74)
- Correct as of 15 November 2025

Andrew John Kellaway (born 12 October 1995) is an Australian former professional rugby union player who last played for the New South Wales Waratahs in Super Rugby. He also previously played for the Melbourne Rebels and English club Northampton. Kellaway has been capped for Australia's national team, the Wallabies. His regular playing positions were fullback and wing.

== Early life ==
After beginning his junior rugby at the Hunters Hill Rugby Club, Kellaway went on to represent Australia at schoolboy and under-20 level. His total of ten tries at the 2014 IRB Junior World Championship broke the tournament record previously held by Julian Savea and Zac Guildford. He then captained the under-20 side in 2015.

Kellaway is a proficient piper, learning the bagpipes at Scots College.

== Career ==
In late 2014, Kellaway began playing for the New South Wales Country Eagles in the National Rugby Championship. He made his Super Rugby run-on debut for the Waratahs against the Brumbies in April 2016. The following week, he signed a further two-year contract with the Waratahs.

Kellaway joined English club Northampton Saints for the 2018–19 season. He then signed with the Melbourne Rebels ahead of the 2020 season, but first playing for Counties Manukau in late 2019 alongside Sonny Bill Williams in New Zealand.

Following a stint in Japan with NEC, Kellaway returned to the Rebels for the 2021 Super Rugby Trans-Tasman competition and was selected in the Wallabies squad for the mid-year tests by national coach Dave Rennie. He made his international debut against France in July 2021 at Suncorp Stadium.

That was the beginning of a successful year for Kellaway. He scored the second most tries (9) in a Wallabies’ debut season and walked away with Rugby Australia’s Rookie of the Year award.

In August 2023, Kellaway was named in 33-man Wallabies squad for 2023 Rugby World Cup in France.

On 11 October 2026, Kellaway announced his retirement from professional rugby via his Instagram.

=== International tries ===
As of 13 September 2025.

Try	Opponent	Location	Venue	Competition	Date	Result	
1	New Zealand	Auckland, New Zealand	Eden Park	2021 Summer International	7 August 2021	Loss	33–25
2	New Zealand	Auckland, New Zealand	Eden Park	2021 Rugby Championship	14 August 2021	Loss	57–22
3	New Zealand	Auckland, New Zealand	Eden Park	2021 Rugby Championship	14 August 2021	Loss	57–22
4	South Africa	Gold Coast, Australia	Robina Stadium	2021 Rugby Championship	12 September 2021	Win	28–26
5	Argentina	Townsville, Australia	North Queensland Stadium	2021 Rugby Championship	25 September 2021	Win	27–8
6	Argentina	Gold Coast, Australia	Robina Stadium	2021 Rugby Championship	2 October 2021	Win	32–17
7	Argentina	Gold Coast, Australia	Robina Stadium	2021 Rugby Championship	2 October 2021	Win	32–17
8	Argentina	Gold Coast, Australia	Robina Stadium	2021 Rugby Championship	2 October 2021	Win	32–17
9	Wales	Cardiff, Wales	Principality Stadium	2021 Autumn International	20 November 2021	Loss	29–28
10	New Zealand	Melbourne, Australia	Docklands Stadium	2022 Rugby Championship	15 September 2022	Loss	37–39
11	New Zealand	Melbourne, Australia	Docklands Stadium	2022 Rugby Championship	15 September 2022	Loss	37–39
12	Argentina	Santa Fe, Argentina	Estadio Brigadier General Estanislao López	2024 Rugby Championship	7 September 2024	Loss	67–27
13	England	London, England	Twickenham Stadium	2024 Autumn international	9 November 2024	Win	37–42
14	Argentina	Sydney, Australia	Sydney Football Stadium	2025 Rugby Championship	13 September 2025	Loss	26–28

== Super Rugby statistics ==
As of 3 June 2023

Season	Team	Games	Starts	Sub	Mins	Tries	Cons	Pens	Drops	Points	Yel	Red
2016	Waratahs	11	10	1	790	2	0	0	0	10	0	0
2017	Waratahs	9	6	3	521	1	0	0	0	5	1	0
2018	Waratahs	2	2	0	113	0	0	0	0	0	0	0
2020	Rebels	6	5	1	444	7	0	0	0	35	0	0
2020 AU	Rebels	8	8	0	612	0	0	0	0	0	0	0
2021 TT	Rebels	4	2	2	226	1	0	0	0	5	0	0
2022	Rebels	11	11	0	824	2	0	0	0	10	0	0
2023	Rebels	9	8	1	603	2	0	0	0	10	0	0
Total		60	52	8	4,133	15	0	0	0	75	1	0
