= Hunters Hill Rugby Club =

Rugby Union club in Hunters Hill, New South Wales

(Australia) Hunters Hill RUFC
- Latin: Facta non Verba ("Deeds not Words")
- Full name: Hunters Hill Rugby Union Football Club
- Nickname: Hillies
- Founded: 1892; 134 years ago
- Location: Hunters Hill, Sydney, Australia
- Ground(s): Boronia Park, Hunters Hill
- League: NSWSRU
Team kit

Official website
- www.huntershillrugby.org.au

The Hunters Hill Rugby Union Football Club, is an Australian rugby union club based in Hunters Hill, New South Wales. The club currently fields six teams in the NSW Suburban Rugby Union competition, known as "Subbies". Hunters Hill was formed in 1892, and is amongst the oldest rugby clubs in Australia.

The club aims to achieve a balance of success and camaraderie on and off the field as well as encouraging people all of ages and genders to enjoy their rugby. As of 2025, Hunters Hill has won fourteen Club Championships and forty five Premierships within the various divisions of the Subbies competition, and is the only club to achieve an undefeated season in the Kentwell Cup, having done so twice in 1977 and 2025.

== History ==
=== Early years: 1892–1914 ===
Hunters Hill RUFC was founded in 1892. Sydney club rugby in the early years was organised on two levels, known simply as Senior and Junior, where Junior denoted second tier teams, not the age of the players. A Senior club competition had been running since 1874, but Junior contests prior to the mid-1880s were somewhat disorganised. There was no formal competition for 'Junior' clubs until 1886 and matches were agreed by arrangement of the clubs (or between schools and clubs).

The City and Suburban Association, formed in 1901, organised a competition for Junior clubs outside the jurisdiction of the Metropolitan and New South Wales Rugby Unions, and the Hunters Hill club joined this competition from at least as early as 1906. The club's present black and white hoops were adopted in 1907 but colours of dark blue and sky blue were used from the mid-1890s.

=== Subbies: 1919–1956 ===
Following the re-establishment of New South Wales rugby in 1919 after the war, a new combined competition formed. Hunters Hill won the premiership for non-district clubs in 1919. At the beginning of the 1923 season, W.H. Kentwell, president of the Mosman Rugby Club, presented the Kentwell Cup perpetual trophy for what was effectively the first grade competition of the non-district clubs at the time. Eight teams competed in 1923 and the cup was won by Mosman with Hunters Hill as the runners-up. Hunters Hill played the finals in 1930 and 1932, and again in 1938 – but were not to win the Kentwell Cup until 1972. The club did however win the second grade finals of 1925 and 1926 for the G.B. Burke Cup.

After the war, Hunters Hill won the G.B. Burke Cup again in 1955. The club won the H.W. Whiddon Cup for the third grade competition, in 1949, 1951, and 1955. The club fell away, however, and no senior rugby sides were fielded for nine seasons from 1957. Outside of the World Wars this was the senior club's only break of continuity, but the junior club had remained strong with up to ten teams playing.

=== Comeback and Golden era: 1966–1991 ===
In 1966, Hunters Hill made a return to Subbies and over the next six years expanded from one senior team to three. The club won the Division II first grade in 1971 for the John Barraclough Cup (as well as the Reliance Shield club championship) and fielded four teams after promotion to Division I in 1972. Coached by former the NSW and Wallaby player John Francis, the club achieved immediate success by winning the Division I first grade premiership in 1972 for the Kentwell Cup.

Through the 1970s and 1980s, Hunters Hill had a golden period in Division I, securing Kentwell Cup victories in 1972, 1977–79, 1981, and 1987. The club won the Bruce Graham Shield four times for the Division I Club Championship in 1977, 1979–81, and 1987. Eventually the club was relegated to Division II in 1991.

=== Centenary and regrowth: 1992 to 2010 ===
Hunter's Hill undertook a recruitment drive to boost playing members ahead of the Club's centenary in 1992. In that season, the first grade team wore jerseys which incorporated the two blue colours from the 1900s. The Hunters Hill club also travelled to the Hong Kong Sevens tournament. In 1994, "The Cats" team for over-35s was formed. The club gained promotion to Division I for the 1995 season. A colts team was also formed in 1995, and the club entered and won the NSW Sevens tournament. The Hunters Hill club moved up and down between divisions. The 1st Grade side tasted success in 1995 and 1997, winning the Division I 'Kentwell Cup'.

=== Recent times: 2010 to present ===
In 2011, Hunters Hill won the interdivisional Cowboy Cup, as well as the Division II Club Champions Reliance Shield and first grade John Barraclough Cup, to gain promotion once again to Division I in 2012.

In 2016, Hunters Hill won the Subbies 7's Tournament, beating Blacktown 15–5 in the final, before claiming the Barraclough Cup once again as the first grade premiers in Division II.

2017 saw all four senior grades participate in the finals, with 1st grade and 3rd grade claiming the minor premierships. Hunter's Hill was awarded the Division II Club Champions Reliance Shield. This success has provided Hunters Hill promotion to Tier I for the 2018 season.

== NSW Suburban Rugby Union Premierships ==
Hunters Hill has won club championship and premiership titles across multiple competitions since 1919:

=== Club Championships ===
==== Interdivisional ====
- 2025 - Interdivisional Club Champions: Cowboy Cup
- 2011 - Interdivisional Club Champions: Cowboy Cup

==== Division I ====
- 2025 - Club Champions: Bruce Graham Shield
- 1987 - Club Champions: Bruce Graham Shield
- 1981 - Club Champions: Bruce Graham Shield
- 1980 - Club Champions: Bruce Graham Shield
- 1979 - Club Champions: Bruce Graham Shield

==== Division II ====
- 2020 - Club Champions: Reliance Shield
- 2017 - Club Champions: Reliance Shield
- 2011 - Club Champions: Reliance Shield
- 1994 - Club Champions: Reliance Shield
- 1993 - Club Champions: Reliance Shield

==== Division III ====
- 2009 - Club Champions: Doc Harris Shield

=== Premierships ===
==== Division I ====
- 2025 - 1st Grade Kentwell Cup*
- 2024 - Colts Barbour Cup
- 2000 - Colts Barbour Cup (Joint Premiers: Old Ignatians)
- 1997 - 1st Grade Kentwell Cup
- 1995 - 1st Grade Kentwell Cup
- 1987 - 1st Grade Kentwell Cup, 2nd Grade Burke Cup
- 1986 - 3rd Grade Whiddon Cup
- 1985 - 4th Grade Judd Cup
- 1983 - 3rd Grade Whiddon Cup, 4th Grade Judd Cup
- 1982 - 3rd Grade Whiddon Cup
- 1981 - 1st Grade Kentwell Cup
- 1980 - 2nd Grade Burke Cup, 3rd Grade Whiddon Cup, 4th Grade Judd Cup
- 1979 - 1st Grade Kentwell Cup, 4th Grade Judd Cup
- 1978 - 1st Grade Kentwell Cup, 3rd Grade Whiddon Cup
- 1977 - 1st Grade Kentwell Cup*, 2nd Grade Burke Cup, 3rd Grade Whiddon Cup
- 1972 - 1st Grade Kentwell Cup
- 1969 - 3rd Grade Whiddon Cup
- 1955 - 3rd Grade Whiddon Cup
- 1954 - 2nd Grade Burke Cup
- 1951 - 3rd Grade Whiddon Cup
- 1949 - 3rd Grade Whiddon Cup

==== Division II ====
- 2020 - 1st Grade Barraclough Cup *, 2nd Grade Stockdale Cup *
- 2019 - 2nd Grade Stockdale Cup, 4th Grade Richardson Cup
- 2017 - 3rd Grade - Blunt Cup
- 2016 - 1st Grade Barraclough Cup
- 2011 - 1st Grade Barraclough Cup
- 2010 - 2nd Grade Stockdale Cup, 4th Grade Richardson Cup
- 1994 - 3rd Grade Blunt Cup
- 1992 - 2nd Grade Stockdale Cup

==== Division III ====
- 2005 - 4th Grade Nicholson Cup, Colts Rugby Club Cup
- 2008 - 4th Grade Nicholson Cup

_{NSWRU: Reserve Grade B division}

- 1926 - 2nd Grade Burke Cup*
- 1925 - 2nd Grade Burke Cup (Joint Premiers: Briars)
- 1919 - 1st Grade Premiers

=== Subbies Preseason 7s ===
- 2019 - Cup Winner
- 2017 - Cup Winner

Notes:

* indicates undefeated season.

== Notable players ==
Hunters Hill players who have gone on to gain international or provincial caps:

- Andrew Kellaway – Australia and New South Wales
- Sosene Anesi – ex-All Black.
- Angus Bell – Australia and New South Wales.
- Will Harris – New South Wales.

== Sources ==
- Horton, Peter (2009). "Rugby Union Football in the Land of the Wallabies, 1874-1949: same game, different ethos". The International Journal of the History of Sport. 26 (11): 1611–1629. doi:10.1080/09523360903169925. S2CID 143976861.
- Horton, Peter. "Rugby Union Football in the Land of the Wallabies, 1874-1949: same game, different ethos". htmlpublish.
- Hickie, Tom V: The Game for the Game Itself!: The Development of Sub-District Rugby in Sydney, (1983) Sydney Sub-District Rugby Union. ISBN 978-0959194104
- Mulford, John G: Guardians of the Game: The History of the New South Wales Rugby Union 1874-2004. (2005) ABC Books. ISBN 0-7333-1625-5
- Pollard, Jack: Australian Rugby: The game and the players. (1994) Pan Macmillan. ISBN 0-330-35619-4
