= Kini Fotu =

Tongan rugby union player

- Born: Tevita Kinisiliti Fotu circa 1965 Kolofo'ou, Tongatapu
- School: Tonga College

Rugby union career
- Position: Number 8
Amateur team(s)
Years	Team	Apps	(Points)
1984-198?	Tonga College		
Senior career
Years	Team	Apps	(Points)
198?-1994	Hornsby Rugby Union Club		
International career
Years	Team	Apps	(Points)
1986-1994	Tonga	8	(4)

Tevita Kinisiliti Fotu, also known as Kini Fotu (born circa 1965) is a Tongan former rugby union player. He played as number 8. He represented Tonga in the international rugby union scene between 1986 and 1994.

== Career ==
Although being first called up for the national team in 1994, Fotu had his first international test cap for Tonga during the 1987 Rugby World Cup, in the match against Ireland in Napier, on 24 May 1987, which was the only match in the tournament he played. His last international test cap was against Samoa, in Apia, on 17 June 1990. At club level he played for Hornsby Rugby Union Club, with which he won the Best & Fairest Award in 1991.

== After career ==
In 2003, Fotu undertook a Diploma in Sports Development course at Port Macquarie TAFE and was the development officer for Tonga. A year before, he coached the Tonga national under-20 rugby union team.
