= Warren Livingstone =

Australian businessman (born 1973)

- Born: Warren Livingstone; 1973 (age 52–53); Sydney, Australia
- Known for: Founder of Fanatics
- Board member of: Fanatics; Balmain Rugby Club; Sydney Stars

Warren Livingstone (born September 1973 in Sydney) is an Australian businessman, sports administrator and publican. He is the founder and managing director of the Australian sports organisation Fanatics, the former president of Balmain Rugby Club and Sydney Hotel owner.

Livingstone played NSW Schoolboys Rugby League and Cricket and attended Sydney Technical High School in Bexley. He started out as a copy boy for Sydney's Daily Telegraph newspaper, whilst at Sydney University studying Politics.

He was a pioneer in the early dot-com boom in Australia before moving to San Francisco in 2000 as founder and CEO of writtenbyme.com a Sydney-based dot-com which was funded by a large group of investors including Kevin Weldon and Michael Ball before exiting with a sale to US publisher Simon & Schuster

A successful businessman and social scene regular he often featured in Cleo magazine's 50 Most Eligible Bachelors in the late 1990s.

In 2004 he re-established the Balmain Rugby Club (first formed in 1873 but folded in 1919) and bankrolled the club with a roster of high-profile players including Wallabies Drew Mitchell, Matt Giteau, Ryan Cross, Matt Dunning and French star Sebastian Chabal. Livingstone formed a joint venture between Balmain and the Sydney University club in 2014 to enter the Sydney Stars team in Australia's inaugural National Rugby Championship.

Fanatics

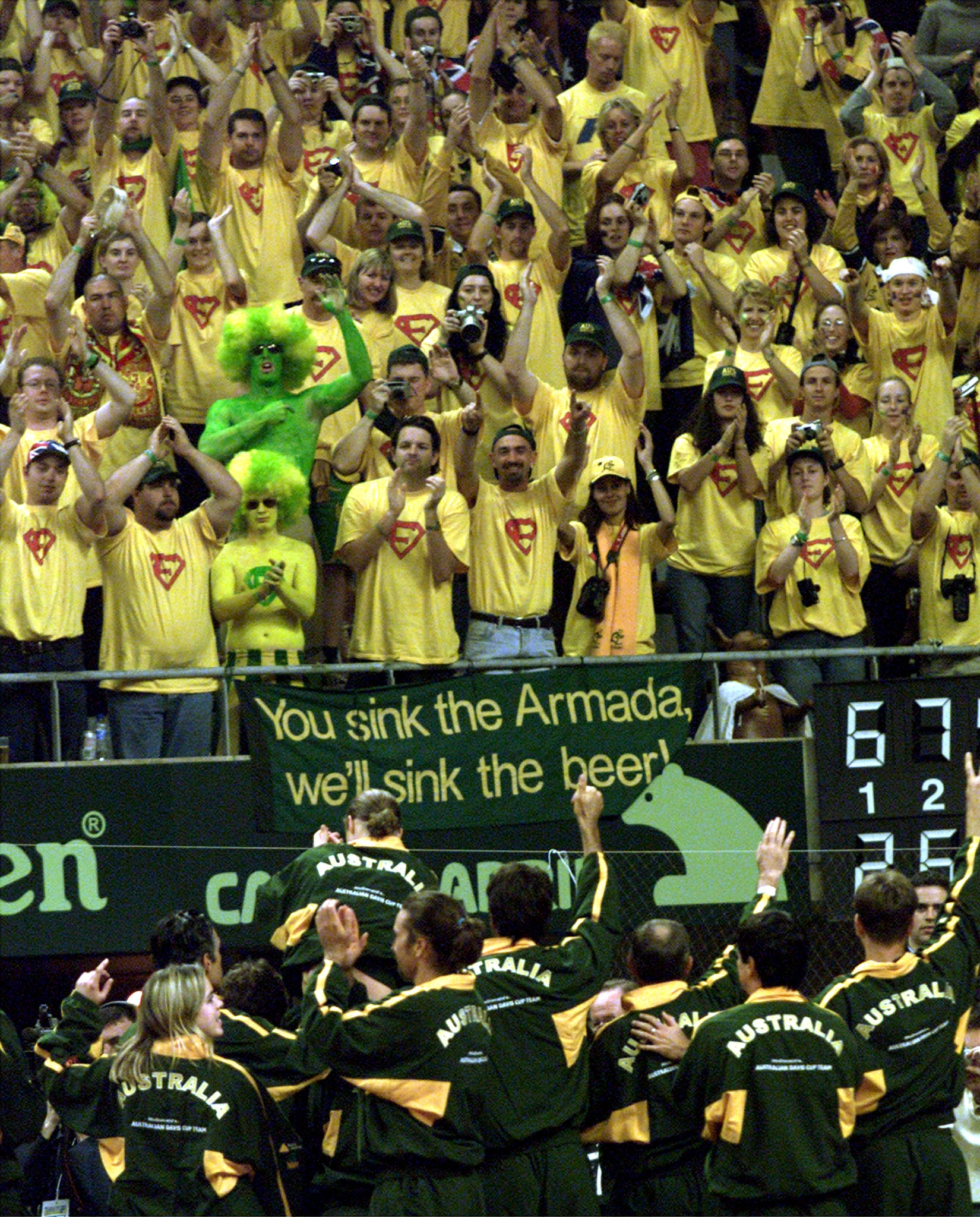
Fanatics in full force at the Davis Cup in Barcelona, December 2000

In 1997 he founded the Fanatics to cater for sports fans that follow Australian teams and athletes around the world.

The first sports travel business of its kind, the Fanatics gained notoriety for organizing thousands of fans to attend Australian sporting events around the world. The Fanatics became the official supporter group for Australia men's cricket team, Australia national football team, Australia national rugby union team, and the Australia Davis Cup team

Such was the influence of the Fanatics that players demanded they be supported by sports administrators and sometimes withdrew from events in a show of solidarity when they were not taken care of. Lleyton Hewitt was said to have pulled out of the Davis Cup over the treatment of his unofficial supporters at the Australian Open

Fanatics opened offices in Sydney in 1997 and London in 2002 where they sold sports apparel and ran tours to sporting events and the large European cultural events such as Oktoberfest Running of the bulls, La Tomatina and Croatia sailing trips. The London office was closed due to the COVID-19 pandemic.

As of 2024, the Fanatics has over 380,000 members and has organised travel for more than 300,000 fans to sporting events including cricket, football, rugby league and rugby union matches, and also major tennis tournaments and cultural European festivals.

Hotels

In 2014 Livingstone purchased the Charing Cross Hotel in Waverley and renovated it as a gastro pub with a 2 hatted chef; Matt Kemp. In 2018 he purchased Hotel William on William St, Darlinghurst and reopened it as Hyde Park House after a $5 million overhaul. In 2020 he purchased the Captain Cook Hotel in Botany for $17 million. In 2022 he purchased the Rose and Crown in Parramatta for $42 million and in 2023 he purchased the Australian Hotel in McGraths Hill for $12 million

Court Case

In 2022 Livingstone's company FanFirm (Fanatics) sued the American mega sports merchandise company Fanatics LLC in the Federal Court of Australia for trademark infringement. The long and very public trademark battle ended in victory to Livingstone's Australian company FanFirm The US company appealed the loss to the High Court of Australia but lost that appeal again in a monumental David v Goliath victory for the Australians. As a result all Fanatics LLC branded sports apparel is banned from sale in Australia including NFL, NBA, MLB and NHL.
