= Balmain RFC =

Australian rugby union club, based in Sydney

Balmain
- Full name: Balmain Rugby Club
- Nickname: Muzzled Wolves
- Founded: 2005; 21 years ago
- Location: Balmain, Sydney, Australia
- Ground(s): Billy Murdoch Field, Glover Street, Lilyfield (Capacity: 5.000)
- League: NSWSRU
Team kit

Official website
- www.balmainrugby.com

The Balmain Rugby Club is an Australian rugby union football club, based in Balmain, Sydney, New South Wales. The original Balmain Football Club was founded in 1873 and was one of the earliest rugby clubs established in Sydney and Australia.

Balmain FC was one of the founding members in 1874 of the Southern Rugby Union, later renamed the New South Wales Rugby Union, which was the first governing body for the sport in the Southern Hemisphere. The club's colours that season were dark blue and white hoops. Billy Murdoch, who would later go on to captain the Australian cricket team, was Balmain's first captain, and he represented the club at the Southern Rugby Union's formation.

In 1900 under the city's new district clubs scheme a Balmain club was included, adopting new colours of black and gold stripes. Over the ensuing decade Balmain provided several players who have represented Australia in international rugby, including Bob Craig, Robert Graves, and Herbert Moran, who was captain of the 1908 Australian side and served as Balmain's president in 1911–12. Bill McKell who would later become Australia's Governor General also played for Balmain in 1909–10.

During the First World War the Balmain club and the neighbouring Glebe district club merged to form what is now the Drummoyne DRFC.

Re-established in 2005 by Warren Livingstone as the Balmain Rugby Club, it attracted international players including Wallabies Drew Mitchell, Matt Giteau, Matt Dunning and Ryan Cross, and French representative Sébastien Chabal.

Balmain currently competes in the New South Wales Suburban Rugby Union competition and won the first grade premiership Kentwell Cup in 2013, shared with St Patrick's Rugby Club after a 33-all extra-time draw. The club won the Kentwell Cup two years later with a 43–29 win over Knox in the 2015 Grand Final.

== Bibliography ==
- Mulford, John G. (2005a). Guardians of the Game: The History of the New South Wales Rugby Union 1874-2004. ABC Books. ISBN 0-7333-1625-5. Archived from the original on 19 January 2015.
- Mulford, John G. (2005b). Men in scarlet: history of the Balmain, Glebe and Drummoyne Rugby clubs 1874-2004. John Mulford MacMasters Beach, N.S.W. ISBN 0-646-44931-1.
- Pollard, Jack: Australian Rugby: The game and the players. (1994) Pan Macmillan. ISBN 0-330-35619-4
