= Lindfield Rugby Club =

Australian rugby union club, based in Lindfield, NSW

Lindfield
- Full name: Lindfield Rugby Club
- Nickname: Soldiers
- Founded: 1919; 107 years ago
- Location: East Lindfield, Sydney
- Ground(s): Soldiers Memorial Park, Tryon Road, East Lindfield
- President: Tom Parisj
- Coach(es): James Barkell, Rory Toemoe, Joel Thorpe
- League: NSWSRU
Team kit

Official website
- lindfieldrugby.com

The Lindfield Rugby Club is an Australian rugby union football club in Lindfield, a suburb on Sydney's Upper North Shore. The club's home ground is in the neighbouring suburb of East Lindfield which shares the same postcode as Lindfield. Lindfield competes in the NSWSRU competition. The Lindfield Juniors Rugby club is also one of the largest for junior players in Australia.

== History ==
The Lindfield Rugby Club was founded in 1919 by soldiers returning from the first world war. The club played in local rugby competitions before being admitted to the Metropolitan Sub-Districts Rugby Union in 1948 and winning the minor premiership in that year.

Lindfield remained in first division for most of the next five decades, being relegated once for the 1987 season before returning to the top level for another eight seasons until 1995. The club then spent most of the next twenty years in lower divisions, aside from two seasons in first division for 2009 and 2010. Lindfield finally secured promotion to the top level again for 2016, but the club was found to have breached amateur status a few weeks before the end of the season and was prohibited from playing for the remainder of the year before being relegated to second division for 2017. After winning the Bareaclogh cup in 2023, Lindfield returned to Division one. This time they brought with them Lindfield Legacy - the clubs recently formed Ladies Team.

in 2024 first grade finished 4th making the finals in their first year under the guidance of chip Carrol, Rory Toemoe and Jack McGregor.

in Season 2025 the club experienced huge success with the Legacy making the grand final and finishing runners up. The men’s first grade team spent most of the season in the top 4, eventually finishing 4th, bowing out in the first week of the finals. The team had a phenomenal season beating the other top 4 teams in 5 games out of 6. In addition club stalwart Jeremy Well was named NSW subbies player of the year. Both Jeremy and captain Sam Reimer making the NSW Suburban Rugby side playing in the Australian Rugby Shield.

.

== International players ==
The first Lindfield player to be selected for Australia in international rugby was Bruce Taafe in 1969. More recently, players including Wallabies Stirling Mortlock, Andrew Blades, and Cameron Blades, Canadian international Evan Olmstead and Italian international Daniel Costa (109 Tests) have been Lindfield club members.

== Bibliography ==
- Mulford, John G. (2005). Guardians of the Game: The History of the New South Wales Rugby Union 1874–2004. ABC Books. ISBN 0-7333-1625-5. Archived from the original on 19 January 2015.
- Pollard, Jack: Australian Rugby: The game and the players. (1994) Pan Macmillan. ISBN 0-330-35619-4
