= Blue Mountains Rugby Club =

Australian rugby union club, based in Lapstone, NSW

Blue Mountains
- Full name: Blue Mountains Rugby Club
- Nickname(s): Blueys, Mountain Goats
- Founded: 1956; 70 years ago
- Location: Blue Mountains, Sydney
- Ground(s): Lapstone Oval, Explorers Road, Lapstone
- League: NSWSRU
Team kit

Official website
- bluemountains.rugby.net.au

Blue Mountains Rugby Club is based in the township of Lapstone within Greater Sydney, Australia. The club plays rugby union in the first division of the New South Wales Subbies competition and currently fields teams in five men's grades, plus women's and colts teams.

The Blue Mountains Rugby Club also has an associated junior club known as the Blue Tongues for young players ranging from under-6 to under-18 age groups, including both boys and girls.

== History ==
Blue Mountains Rugby Club was founded in 1956. The club played friendly matches before being admitted to the Sub-Districts Rugby Union in 1968. Blue Mountains was promoted to the first division in 1983, staying up for seven seasons before being relegated at the end of 1989. In 1991 the club went straight back to first division where they remained for two seasons until being relegated at the end of 1992. Blue Mountains spent most of the next three decades in lower divisions before securing promotion to the top level again for the 2019 season after winning the Reliance Shield for the second division club championship in 2018. On September 2, 2023, the club reached the Kentwell Cup Grand Final, culminating in a maiden Premiership with a 44–40 victory over Hunters Hill Rugby Club at Concord Oval, NSW.

== Notable players ==
Blue Mountains players who have gone on to gain international or provincial caps:

- Alan Cardy – Australia and New South Wales

== Bibliography ==
- The Double Blue Jumper: History of Blue Mountains Rugby. 2005.
- Pollard, Jack: Australian Rugby: The game and the players. (1994) Pan Macmillan. ISBN 0-330-35619-4
- Mulford, John G. (2005). Guardians of the Game: The History of the New South Wales Rugby Union 1874–2004. ABC Books. ISBN 0-7333-1625-5.
