= Woollahra Colleagues RFC =

Australian rugby union club, based in Woollahra, NSW

(Australia) Colleagues
- Full name: Woollahra Colleagues Rugby Union Football Club
- Nickname: Blue Giants
- Founded: 1933; 93 years ago
- Location: Woollahra, Sydney, Australia
- Ground(s): Woollahra Oval No. 2 & 3, Manion Ave, Rose Bay
- Coach: Ben Waters
- League: NSWSRU
Team kit

Official website
- www.colleaguesrugby.com.au

The Woollahra Colleagues Rugby Union Football Club, known as Colleagues, is a rugby union club based in Woollahra, in Sydney, Australia. The club was founded in the 1930s and currently plays in the First Division of the NSWSRU competition.

== History ==
A stalwart of the Woollahra Colleagues club and New South Wales Suburban Rugby for many years was Lindley John Forbes (John) Barraclough AM (1926–2005), a former New South Wales MP. The Barraclough Shield, which is the trophy for interstate matches between the New South Wales Suburban and Queensland Suburban representative teams, was named after him and has been contested annually since 1966.

== Colours and home ground ==
The Woollahra Colleagues club has the nickname "Blue Giants" and plays in a sky blue jersey and navy shorts. The club's home grounds are Woollahra Ovals No. 2 and 3 at Rose Bay.

== Alliance ==
Colleagues shares an alliance with London club, Belsize Park Rugby Football Club. Belsize Park Rugby Football club was one of the founding clubs of the Rugby Football Union in 1871.

== Premierships ==
Colleagues have won the Bruce Graham Shield on 25 occasions, and the Kentwell Cup on 16 occasions: 1941, 1950, 1955, 1957, 1959, 1960, 1962, 1963, 1966, 1970, 1980, 1982, 1984, 1996, 2011 and 2022.
