= Ken Yanz =

Australian rugby union player (1929–2019)

- Born: Kenneth Yanz; 18 May 1929 Hornsby, New South Wales
- Died: 5 February 2019 (aged 89) Sydney, New South Wales

Rugby union career
- Position: flanker
Amateur team(s)
Years	Team	Apps	(Points)
- Gordon RFC
International career
Years	Team	Apps	(Points)
1958	Wallabies	1	(0)

Kenneth Yanz (18 May 1929 – 5 February 2019) was a rugby union player who represented Australia.

Yanz, a flanker, was born in Hornsby, New South Wales and claimed 1 international rugby cap for Australia on the Wallabies' 1957–58 Australia rugby union tour of Britain, Ireland and France and played for New South Wales.

== Career ==
Born in the Sydney suburb of Hornsby, Yanz learned his rugby playing for the Lane Cove Rugby Club and Gordon Juniors. After high school, he worked his way up through Gordon. He played regularly in North Harbour v South Harbour matches and for the Sydney XV and was selected for the Australia national rugby union team 1957–58 Australia rugby union tour of Britain, Ireland and France. He played in the Test against France in Paris. He later played for the New South Wales Team and was appointed Captain of Gordon, where he set a club record for games played. In 2012, Yanz recalled his playing days for a documentary about the history of Lane Cove Rugby by Theo Clark Media.
