= Barraclough Shield =

- Organising body: (New South Wales) NSWSRU (Queensland) QSRU
- Founded: 1966
- Abolished: 2016; 9 years ago
- Region: New South Wales; Queensland
- Number of teams: 2
- Most successful team(s): New South Wales (43)

The Barraclough Shield is the trophy for interstate rugby union matches between the New South Wales Suburban and Queensland Suburban representative teams, colloquially known as "Subbies". The Barraclough Shield was first contested in 1966 and was named after Lindley John Forbes (John) Barraclough AM (1926-2005), a former New South Wales MP and stalwart of New South Wales Suburban Rugby.

== History ==
As of 2020, New South Wales have won the Barraclough Shield on forty three occasions, Queensland have won five, with three matches drawn. Recent matches have usually been played at Ballymore Stadium in Brisbane, but the match in the 50th year of Subbies Rugby in Queensland was played at Suncorp Stadium as the curtain-raiser to the Queensland Reds match against the British and Irish Lions.

List of winners since 1966:

Year	Winner
since 2017	Not contested
2016	New South Wales 38 d Queensland 3
2015	New South Wales 62 d Queensland 13
2014	New South Wales 60 d Queensland 19
2013	New South Wales 45 d Queensland 0
2012	New South Wales 35 d Queensland 16
2011	New South Wales 12 d Queensland 9
2010	Draw 22-22
2009	New South Wales 41 d Queensland 21
2008	Queensland 31 d New South Wales 28
2007	New South Wales 33 d Queensland 19
2006	Queensland 17 d New South Wales 12
2000–05	New South Wales
1993–99	New South Wales
1992	Queensland 18 d New South Wales 13
1991	New South Wales
1990	Not contested
1986-89	New South Wales
1985	Queensland 22 d New South Wales 13
1979–84	New South Wales
1978	Draw 6-6
1973–77	New South Wales
1972	Queensland 13 d New South Wales 12
1969-71	New South Wales
1968	Not contested
1967	New South Wales
1966	Draw 12-12

== See also ==
- Rugby union in Australia
- List of Australian club rugby union competitions
