= Hornsby Rugby Union Club =

Australian rugby union club, based in Sydney, NSW

Hornsby
- Full name: Hornsby Rugby Club
- Union: Rugby Australia
- Nickname: Lions
- Founded: 1962; 64 years ago
- Location: Sydney, New South Wales, Australia
- Ground(s): Waitara Oval, Waitara Ave, Hornsby
- League: NSWSRU
Team kit

Official website
- www.hornsbyrugby.com.au

The Hornsby Rugby Union Football Club is a rugby union team from Hornsby in Sydney, Australia. The club plays in the New South Wales Suburban Rugby Union competition, and has historically competed in the Central Coast competition.

== History ==
The club was formed in 1962 when Sydney Rugby Union established a Second Division of the Sydney Grade Competition. That competition was absorbed into the New South Wales Suburban Rugby Union 'Subbies' competition in 1993 bringing Hornsby, Mosman, Drummoyne and UNSW with it. In their first year in the new competition Hornsby won the 1st Division Club Championship (Bruce Graham Shield) along with the 2nd Grade, 3rd Grade and Colts Premierships. Hornsby was relegated to Second Division in 1998 and to Third Division in 2012. Hornsby transferred to the Central Coast Rugby Union's competition for the 2015 season.

== Club information ==
Club Name: Hornsby Rugby Union Football Club
Nickname: The Lions, HRC
Founded: 1962
Home Ground: Waitara Oval
Club Colors: Red, Black & Gold

== Honours ==
1st Grade: 1991 (Sydney 2nd Div) 2024 (Div 4)

Women's: 2024, 2025 and 2026 (Joy Johnson Cup)

2nd Grade: 1993 Burke Cup Premiers (Div 1), 1966 & 1984 (Sydney 2nd Div), 2026 Farrant Cup (Div 3)

3rd Grade: 2009, 2000 and 1999 Blunt Cup Premiers (Div 2), 1993 Whiddon Cup Premiers (Div 1), 1985, 1991 and 1990 Premiers (Sydney 2nd Div)

4th Grade: 2006 and 1999 Richardson Cup Premiers (Div 2), 1992 Premiers (Sydney 2nd Div), 1971 Premiers (Sydney 2nd Div)

Colts - Under 21s: 2009 and 2007 Robertson Cup Premiers (Div 2), 1993 Barbour Cup Premiers (Div 1), 1991 Premiers (Sydney 2nd Div)

Colts - Under 21s 2nd Grade: 1987 Premiers (Sydney 2nd Div)

== Bibliography ==
- New South Wales Suburban Rugby Union. Annual Report 2004, 2005, 2006, 2007, 2008, 2009, 2010
- The game for the game itself: The History of sub-district rugby in Sydney – Thomas V. Hickie and Anthony T. Hughes
- Men in Scarlet: The History of the Balmain, Glebe & Drummoyne Rugby Clubs 1874-2004 – John Mulford
