= Knox Rugby Club =

Australian rugby union club, based in Sydney

Knox
- Full name: Knox Rugby Club
- Union: Australian Rugby Union
- Founded: 1959; 67 years ago
- Location: West Pymble, Sydney, Australia
- Region: New South Wales
- Coach: Harry Chapman
- Captain: Max Glover
- League: NSWSRU
Team kit

Official website
- www.knoxrugby.com.au

The Knox Rugby Club, formerly known as Knox Old Boys RUFC, is a rugby union football club which plays in Division Three of the New South Wales Suburban Rugby Union and is based in West Pymble on Sydney's Upper North Shore. The club has won the Kentwell Cup, among other trophies.

== History ==
The club was founded by and is associated with the ex-students association of Knox Grammar School, a Uniting Church day and boarding school for boys, located in Wahroonga, an upper North Shore suburb of Sydney. The club won the New South Wales Suburban Rugby Union's Kentwell Cup in 2005 and 2009.

== Notable players ==
- Ross Turnbull – Australia (1968)
- Nathan Charles - Australia (2014)
- Richard Woolf - NSW (2017)
- Michael Ainsworth – Brazil (2024)

Two Knox players became Chairman of the Australian Rugby Union; Ross Turnbull and David Clark.

== Past Premierships ==
=== Club Championships (8) ===
Division	Year Won
Division 1 – Bruce Graham Shield	2006, 2009, 2010
Division 2 – Reliance Shield	1992, 2004
Division 3 – 'Doc' Harris Shield	2003, 2024
Division 4 – Herlihy Shield	2002

=== 1st Grade Premierships: 6 ===
Premiership	Year Won
Division 1 – Kentwell Cup	2005, 2009
Division 2 – Barraclough Cup	1991, 2004
Division 3 – Clark Cup	2003
Division 4 – McLean Cup	2002

=== 2nd Grade Premierships: 7 ===
Premiership	Year Won
Division 1 – Burke Cup	1966, 2006, 2007, 2008
Division 2 – Stockdale Cup	2004
Division 4 – Grose Cup	1987, 2002

=== 3rd Grade Premierships: 10 ===
Premiership	Year Won
Division 1 – Whiddon Cup	1961, 1962, 2012, 2013, 2018, 2019
Division 2 – Blunt Cup	1988, 1992
Division 4 – Walker Cup	1987, 2002

=== 4th Grade Premierships: 2 ===
Premiership	Year Won
Division 1 – Judd Cup	2017
Division 2 – Richardson Cup	1986*, 1988

*Denotes joint premiership with Waverley.

=== 5th Grade Premierships: 1 ===
Premiership	Year Won
Division 1 – Sutherland Cup	2012

=== Colts Premierships: 8 ===
Premierships	Year Won
Division 1 – Barbour Cup	2009, 2012, 2013, 2016
Division 2 – Robertson Cup	1995, 1998
Division 3 - Nicholson Cup	2024, 2025
Sydney U/19s Cup	2003

== See also ==
- Rugby union in New South Wales
- List of Old Knox Grammarians
