= Mosman Rugby Club =

Australian rugby union club, based in Sydney

(Australia) Mosman
- Full name: Mosman Rugby Club
- Union: Rugby Australia
- Nickname: Mosman Whales
- Founded: 1893; 133 years ago
- Location: Mosman, Australia
- Region: New South Wales
- Ground(s): Rawson Oval; Balmoral Oval
- League(s): 1st Division; New South Wales Suburban Rugby Union
Team kit

Official website
- www.mosmanrugby.com.au

Mosman Rugby Club (known as The Mosman Whales) is an Australian rugby union club. It is based is Mosman on the Lower North Shore of Sydney. Home games are played at Rawson Oval and Balmoral Oval. Mosman won the first Kentwell Cup in 1923 and Mosman continues to compete in Division One of the New South Wales Suburban Rugby Union.

== Early years ==
Mosman's first rugby team was formed in 1893 and played its first match wearing a variety of dark jumpers with single white stars stitched on the front. It did not become a club or compete in official competitions until the following year.

The suburb's first rugby club was formed in 1894 as Mosman's Bay Junior Football Club and entered the Third Junior 'B' Division involving ten teams. The club's colours were officially listed as 'Navy with 4 inch Pink Band'.

Mosman played its first match on 26 May 1894 against 'Union', a junior club from inner-Sydney, and finished its inaugural season in 7th place with four wins and five losses.

With the introduction in Sydney rugby union in 1900 of the district clubs scheme and residential rules, all of the 1899 clubs were disbanded (other than the Sydney University FC). Mosman club entered the Borough competition in 1902 when it replaced the third grade level of the district clubs. Mosman contested in second or third grade until 1914.

One of Mosman's foundation players was Denis 'Dinny' Lutge who would become Mosman's only dual rugby international. After joining North Sydney district club in 1900 he played in Australia's inaugural Rugby Union test against New Zealand in August 1903 and three tests against the visiting Great Britain side in 1904.

In 1908 Lutge joined the switch to Rugby League and played against New Zealand in Australia's first official Rugby League series. When the first Kangaroos were selected to visit Great Britain in 1908–09, he was elected tour captain by the players.

In 1915 the Mosman club participated in the NSWRU's season of non-competition games against many of the 1914 first grade clubs. In 1920 the first grade competition (now Shute Shield) included a Mosman district club, however that was its only season (in 1928 the Mosman club made an application for admission to first grade however it was rejected by the NSWRU).

Sydney's sub-districts rugby (now known as the New South Wales Suburban Rugby Union or Subbies) gained its first major trophy in 1923, when W. H. Kentwell, then president of Mosman Rugby, presented the Kentwell Cup. Eight teams competed in that first Kentwell Cup, with Mosman the winner. It remains the trophy of Subbies First Division. In 1924, Mosman's vice-president, James A. Burke, presented the Burke Cup for subdistricts second graders.

== Recent developments ==
In 1989 the Club embarked on its most ambitious project, the refurbishment of its home ground facilities at Rawson Park. This required a huge effort on the part of the Committee of the day - dealing with Local Council and State and Federal Governments of different political persuasions proved interesting. Four years and $500,000 later, and with the help of Mosman Council and Telecom, the doors to the Clubhouse were opened on 26 September 1992.

In 2019, Mosman fielded seven grade teams and 3 Colts teams (Under 21s) in the NSW Suburban Rugby Union's 1st Division as well as 35 junior teams. Registrations in general represent over 200 grade players, 80 colts players and over 450 juniors drawn predominantly from the local area.

== Premierships ==
- Division One Club Championships: 1927, 1954, 1996, 2018, 2019
- Cowboy Cup 2018, 2019, 2020
- Kentwell Cup (1st Grade): 1923, 1927, 1954, 2016, 2019
- Burke Cup (2nd Grade): 1924, 1953, 1996, 2009, 2015, 2018, 2020
- Whiddon Cup (3rd Grade): 2003, 2007
- Judd Cup (4th Grade): 2007, 2020
- Sutherland Cup (5th Grade): 1995, 2017, 2018, 2019, 2020
- Halligan Cup (6th Grade): 1999, 2009, 2011, 2012
- Barbour Cup (Colts): 2002, 2004, 2007, 2018, 2020
- Under 85 kg: 2007, 2009, 2012
- Non District Seconds (1st Grade): 1922 (Mosman's first premiership)
- District Second Division (1st Grade): 1972, 1975, 1977
- District Second Division (2nd Grade): 1971, 1974, 1978
- District Second Division (3rd Grade): 1971, 1973, 1976, 1977
- District Second Division (4th Grade): 1972, 1973, 1976, 1977
- District Third Division (1st Grade): 1979
- District Third Division (2nd Grade): 1979
