= Waverley Rugby Club =

Australian rugby union club, based in Bondi, NSW

Waverley
- Full name: Waverley Rugby Football Club
- Union: Australian Rugby Union
- Founded: 1971; 55 years ago
- Location: Bondi, Australia
- Region: New South Wales
- Ground: Waverley Oval
- League(s): 1st Division; New South Wales Suburban Rugby Union
Team kit

Official website
- www.waverleyrugby.com.au

The Waverley Rugby Football and Sporting Club (Waverley RF&SC) is an Australian rugby club that was founded in 1971 by ex-students of the neighbouring Waverley College and their friends from other local schools. As the Club developed during the 1970s and 1980s, the name "Waverley", its players and supporters, became synonymous with diversity, reflecting the multiculturalism of the Waverley municipality. The club also developed into a sporting club playing netball, softball, touch football, volleyball and, in 2001, women's rugby. It is plays in the New South Wales Suburban Rugby Union, the largest rugby union football competition in New South Wales. The club is based in Bondi in the eastern suburbs of Sydney. In 2020, in its 50th season, Waverley's 1st and 3rd Grades reached the grand finals of the Kentwell and Whiddon Cups (1st Gde and 3rd Gdes, 1st Div.) of the NSW Suburban Rugby Union competition. In 2022, Waverley had all 5 men's open teams reach the semi-finals as well as the U21s, playing in 5 grand finals and winning three: 2nds, 3rds & U21s. In 2023, Waverley had all 5 men's open teams again reach the semi-finals, playing in 3 grand finals and winning all three: 3rds, 4ths & 5ths. Waverley won the division 1 club championship in 2022 & 2024. Waverley had all 6 men’s grades playing finals in 2025, winning the Burke cup & Sutherland cup.

Waverley has a proud history in the New South Wales Suburban Rugby Union competition since the club's foundation in 1971, having won the Inter-Divisional Club Championship, 10 Divisional Club Championships, played in 83 Grand Finals and won 53 Premierships (52 men's and 1 women's). Waverley has won the 1st Division Championship 5 times (in three of which the club also won the 1st Grade title), 2nd Division 4 times, and 3rd Division once. Alongside its men's teams, Waverley Rugby women's team were premiers in 2006, grand finalists in 2007 and NSW 7s Champions in 2016.

In Knock-out competitions, Waverley has won the Taki Toa Challenge Shield for Men 18 times (1983, 1986, 1987, 1988, 1989, 1990, 1991, 1992, 1993, 1994, 1995, 1997, 1999, 2003, 2004, 2006, 2007, 2009). In the NSW Suburban Rugby Union, Waverley has won the Men's Open 7s Knockout in 2023 (Plate) and Men's Under 21s in 2021.

== Club information ==
Club Name: Waverley Rugby Football & Sporting Club Inc.
Founded: 1971
Home stadium: Waverley Oval, Bondi Road
President: Craig Askham
1st Grade Coach: Dion Spice
Club Captain: Callum Bidmead
Uniform colours: Royal Blue and Gold

== Club history ==
The club was founded in 1971

- 2016 2nd Division "Club of the Year"
- 2015 3rd Division "Club of the Year"
- 1988 1st Division "Most Social" & "Best Host"
- 1987 1st Division "Most Social" & "Best Host"
- 1986 2nd Division "Most Social", "Best Host" & "Best Administered"
- 1985 2nd Division "Most Social" & "Best Host"
- 1984 1st Division "Most Social" & "Best Host"

== Premierships ==
Men's Divisional Club Champions: 10 and Inter-Divisional Club Champions: 1.

Total Premierships: 53 - Men's Premierships: 52. Women's Premierships: 1.

- 2023 Whiddon Cup (3rd Grade, 1st Div.) – Minor Premiers & Premiers
- 2023 Judd Cup (4th Grade, 1st Div.) – Premiers
- 2023 Sutherland Cup (5th Grade, 1st Div.) – Premiers

2022 Winners Ian "Cowboy" Ross Cup Inter-Divisional Club Championship &

2022 Winners Bruce Graham Shield 1st Division Club Championship

- 2022 Burke Cup (2nd Grade, 1st Div.) – Minor Premiers & Premiers
- 2022 Whiddon Cup (3rd Grade, 1st Div.) – Minor Premiers & Premiers (Undefeated)
- 2022 Barbour Cup (U21s, 1st Div.) – Premiers
- 2019 Judd Cup (4th Grade, 1st Div.) – Premiers
- 2017 Burke Cup (2nd Grade, 1st Div.) – Minor Premiers & Premiers

2016 Winners Reliance Club Shield 2nd Division Club Championship

- 2016 Stockdale Cup (2nd Grade, 2nd Div.) – Minor Premiers & Premiers
- 2016 Blunt Cup (3rd Grade, 2nd Div.) – Minor Premiers & Premiers
- 2016 NSW Women's "7-a-side" State Champions
- 2016 Richardson Cup (3rd Grade, 2nd Div.) – Minor Premiers
- 2015 Farrant Cup (2nd Grade, 3rd Div.) – Premiers
- 2015 Campbell Cup (3rd Grade, 3rd Div.) – Minor Premiers
- 2014 Farrant Cup (2nd Grade, 3rd Div.) – Minor Premiers & Premiers
- 2013 Campbell Cup (3rd Grade, 3rd Div.) – Premiers
- 2013 Nicholson Cup (4th Grade, 3rd Div.) – Premiers
- 2012 Farrant Cup (2nd Grade, 3rd Div.) – Premiers
- 2010 Richardson Cup (4th Grade, 2nd Div.) – Minor Premiers & Premiers (Undefeated)
- 2009 Richardson Cup (4th Grade, 2nd Div.) – Minor Premiers & Premiers (Undefeated)

2007 Dr Harris Shield 3rd Division Club Champions

- 2007 Clark Cup (1st Grade, 3rd Div.) – Minor Premiers & Premiers
- 2006 Sydney Women's Plate (1st Grade, 2nd Div.) – Premiers

2002 Winners Reliance Club Shield 2nd Division Club Championship

- 2002 Blunt Cup (3rd Grade, 2nd Div.) – Premiers (Undefeated)
- 2001 Barraclough Cup (1st Grade, 2nd Div.) – Premiers
- 2000 Richardson Cup (4th Grade, 2nd Div.) – Premiers
- 1998 Judd Cup (4th Grade, 1st Div.) – Premiers
- 1997 Sutherland Cup (5th Grade, 1st Div.) – Premiers
- 1995 Whiddon Cup (3rd Grade, 1st Div.) – Premiers
- 1995 Judd Cup (4th Grade, 1st Div.) – Premiers
- 1994 Judd Cup (4th Grade, 1st Div.) – Premiers

1992 Winners Bruce Graham Shield 1st Division Club Championship

- 1992 Whiddon Cup (3rd Grade, 1st Div.) – Minor Premiers & Premiers
- 1992 Judd Cup (4th Grade, 1st Div.) – Minor Premiers & Premiers

1991 Winners Bruce Graham Shield 1st Division Club Championship

- 1991 Kentwell Cup (1st Grade, 1st Div.) – Minor Premiers & Joint Premiers
- 1991 Burke Cup (2nd Grade, 1st Div.) – Premiers
- 1991 Whiddon Cup (3rd Grade, 1st Div.) – Premiers
- 1991 Judd Cup (4th Grade, 1st Div.) – Minor Premiers & Premiers

1990 Winners Bruce Graham Shield 1st Division Club Championship

- 1990 Kentwell Cup (1st Grade, 1st Div.) – Minor Premiers & Premiers
- 1990 Burke Cup (2nd Grade, 1st Div.) – Minor Premiers & Premiers
- 1990 Judd Cup (4th Grade, 1st Div.) – Minor Premiers & Premiers

1989 Winners Bruce Graham Shield 1st Division Club championship

- 1989 Kentwell Cup (1st Grade, 1st Div.) – Minor Premiers & Premiers
- 1989 Judd Cup (4th Grade, 1st Div.) – Minor Premiers & Premiers
- 1989 Sutherland Cup (5th Grade, 1st Div.) – Minor Premiers & Premiers
- 1987 Sutherland Cup (5th Grade, 1st Div.) – Minor Premiers & Premiers (Undefeated)

1986 Winners Reliance Club Shield 2nd Division Club Championship

- 1986 Barraclough Cup (1st Grade, 2nd Div.) – Minor Premiers & Premiers
- 1986 Richardson Cup (4th grade, 2nd Div.) – Minor Premiers & Premiers
- 1986 Sutherland Cup (5th Grade, 2nd Div.) – Minor Premiers & Premiers
- 1985 Richardson Cup (4th Grade, 2nd Div.) – Minor Premiers & Premiers (Undefeated)
- 1983 Sutherland Cup (5th Grade, 1st Div.) – Premiers
- 1982 Judd Cup winners (4th Grade, 1st Div.) – Minor Premiers & Premiers
- 1981 Judd Cup winners (4th Grade, 1st Div.) – Premiers

1979 Winners Reliance Club Shield 2nd Division Club Championship

- 1979 Stockdale Cup winners (2nd Grade) 2nd Div. – Minor Premiers & Premiers
- 1979 Blunt Cup winners (3rd Grade) 2nd Div. – Minor Premiers & Premiers
- 1977 Blunt Cup winners (3rd Grade) 2nd Div. – Premiers
- 1974 Grose Cup (2nd Grade) 3rd Div."A"– Minor Premiers & Premiers
- 1972 Walker Cup (1st Grade) 3rd Div."B" – Minor Premiers & Premiers (Undefeated)

== Life Members ==
- 1990 Dr T.V. Hickie & M.N. Sutherland (deceased)
- 1991 R.P. Eardley (deceased) & D.J Hickie
- 1992 P.F. Finegan (deceased) & J.M. Finegan (deceased)
- 1994 S.F. Finegan
- 1998 B.P. Heavener
- 1999 B. Kennedy
- 2001 T.T. Endemann
- 2002 R.T. Mohi
- 2008 D.R. Beaver
- 2011 A.K. Collingridge
- 2012 P.A. Baker
- 2014 M.B.W. Holani & S. Wright
- 2015 K.L Christie
- 2017 R. Willoughby
- 2018 K.R. Brown
- 2019 G.J. Campbell OAM
- 2021 A.L. Coates & R.K. McCoy
- 2022 M.C. Jackson
- 2024 E. Shelton

== Players of note ==
Internationals who began at Waverley

- Owen Finegan – Australia (56 Caps & 1999 Rugby World Cup Winner)
- Sebastian Valech Alonso – Chile (10 Caps)
- Emma McBride – Scotland (Women's)
- Finn M. Wright – Australian Schoolboys 2017 (2 Caps)

Internationals selected from Waverley

- Annita Flannery – Australia (Women's)
- Ruan Sims – Australia (Women's)
- Noella Green – Australia (Women's)

Internationals who later played at Waverley

- Josia Taqiri - Fiji (1 Cap)
- Ben R. Evans – Wales (27 Caps)
- Eddie Paea – Tonga (3 Caps)

== Presidents ==
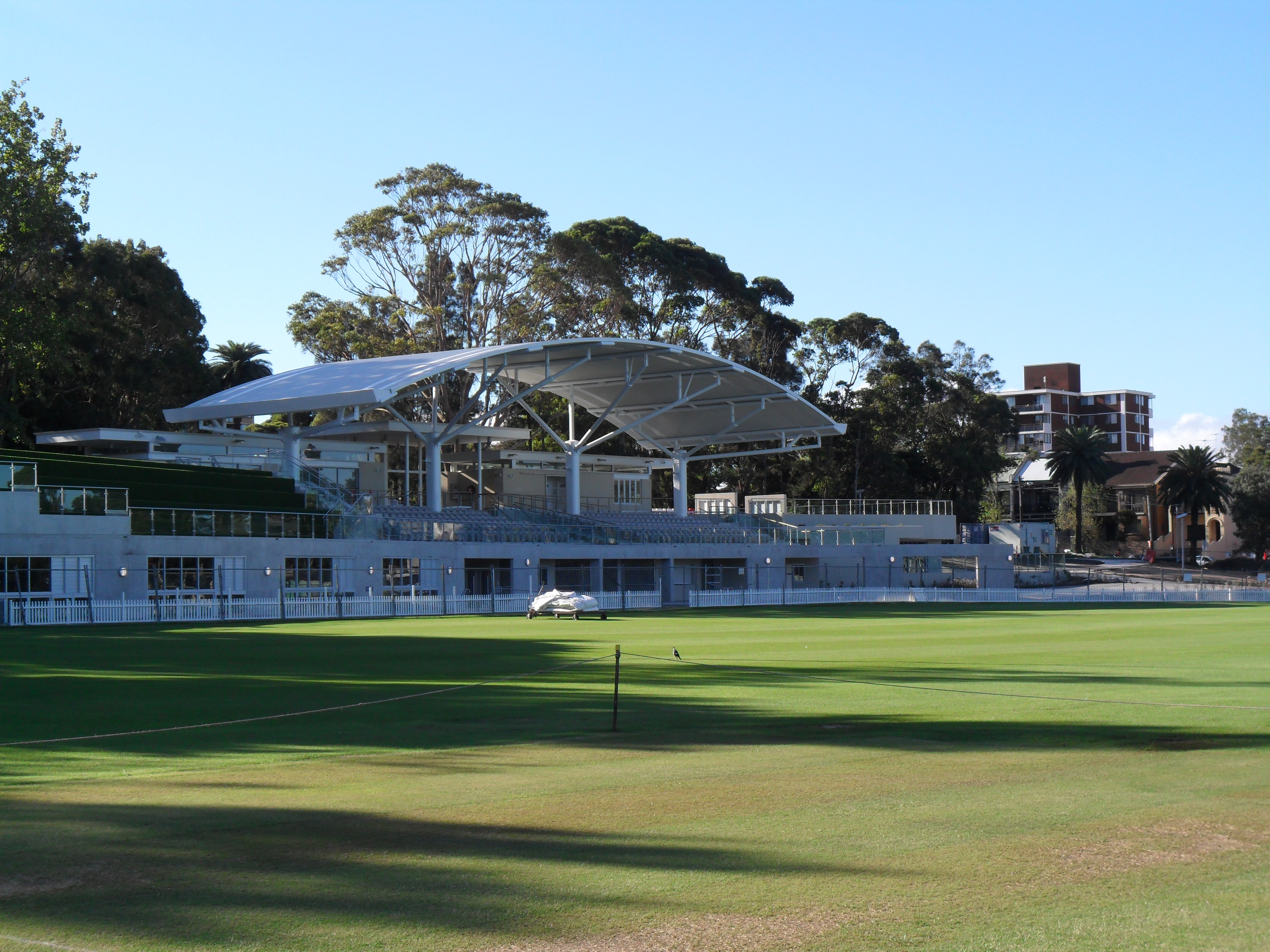
Waverley Oval

- 1971–73: Dr William R. Deverall
- 1974–78: Christopher J. Delohery
- 1979–80: David C. Hawkins
- 1981: Christopher J. Delohery
- 1982: Stephen A. Williamson
- 1983–88: Dr Thomas V. Hickie
- 1989: Brian P. Heavener
- 1990: Samuel P. Post
- 1991–93: Shaun F. Finegan
- 1994: Brian P. Heavener
- 1995–97: Patrick P. O'Shea
- 1998: Brian P. Heavener
- 1999–2000: Craig J.B. Miller
- 2001–03: Michael Hassey
- 2004: Matthew B.W. Holani
- 2005: Matthew G. Brown
- 2006: Ruan Sims OAM
- 2007: Peter Brown
- 2008–09: Kevin Nagle
- 2010: Tivoli T. Endemann
- 2011: James McMillan & Robert Willoughby
- 2012–13: Robert Willoughby
- 2014–17: Kenneth R. Brown
- 2018–20: Edward P.J. Shelton
- 2021–26: Craig G. Askham

== Nearby Clubs ==
- Randwick DRUFC
- Eastern Suburbs RUFC
- Woollahra Colleagues RFC
