= Rugby union in New South Wales =

Rugby Union in New South Wales
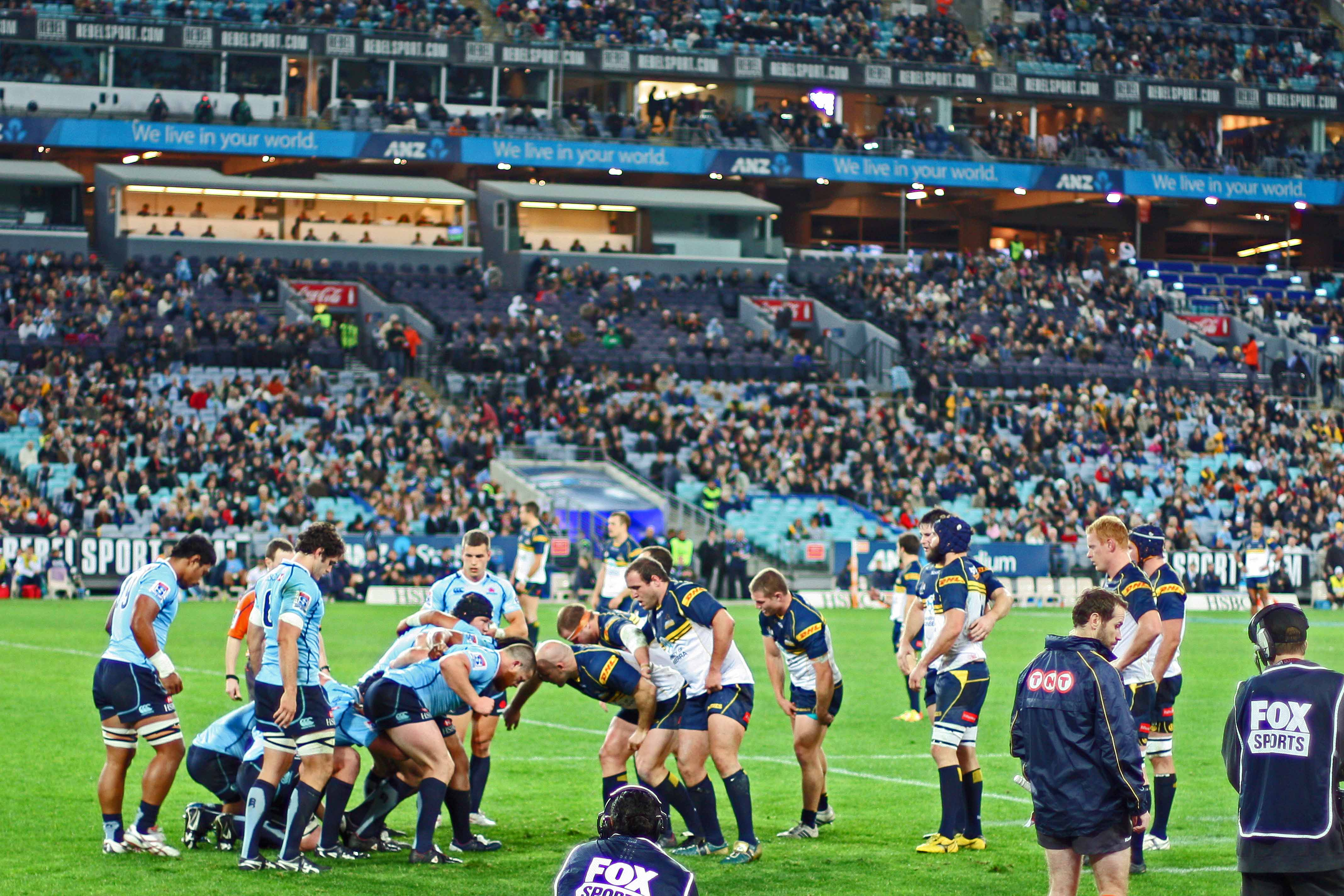
- Waratahs vs Brumbies at ANZ Stadium, 2012.
- Governing body: New South Wales Rugby Union
- State team: New South Wales Waratahs
- First played: 1860s
- Registered players: 35,043

Club competitions
- Super Rugby; National Rugby Championship; Shute Shield; Suburban Rugby

Audience records
- Single match: 109,874 (2000) Australia v New Zealand Stadium Australia, Sydney

Rugby union in New South Wales (NSW) has been played since the 1860s when it was established in the schools and Sydney University. The first recorded game under rugby rules was played by the Wallaroo Football Club in Sydney in 1870. The code dominated until 1908 when huge gate-takings led to a split over professionalism. The code endured and Sydney hosted the 2003 Rugby World Cup Final. In recent decades, Rugby union has struggled to shake its reputation of being a private school game and suffers from the immense popularity of the rival code of Rugby league there.

== History ==
Reports of football being played in the Colony of NSW date from at least as early as 1829 in Sydney at what is now Wynyard Park. In 1841 NSW Governor George Gipps threatened to ban football in Sydney if the playing of the game continued to flout Sunday observance standards.

The city's first football clubs were established in 1865 under Australian rules or variants thereof. Between 1865 and 1869 games were occasional and included matches played by soldiers at Sydney's barracks, against the crews of visiting ships, and teams from the Sydney University. The rules were variable and negotiated by the captains before each game.

=== Rugby beginnings ===
Football played under versions of the Rugby School rules was brought to Australia by Old Boys of the English public schools. Some settlers would have been familiar with earlier forms of the game even before it was formally codified at Rugby School in 1845. The Rugby code was introduced to schools in Sydney from the early 1860s.

=== Club rugby established and formation of the NSWRU (1870 to 1899) ===
Players familiar with the game from the Sydney schools, along with increased arrivals from England and elsewhere, soon led to organised club rugby commencing in Sydney via the arrival of the Wallaroo FC in 1870. The first documented match to have been played under rugby rules was held on 18 June 1870 between Wallaroo FC and combined team of British 'Army & Navy' officers and men played at the Sydney Cricket Ground.

After the Wallaroo FC was founded in 1870 there was a rapid growth in the formation of rugby football clubs across Sydney and NSW's regional towns. The movement that gave birth to the Southern Rugby Football Union (SRFU) and its adoption in toto of England RFU's rugby union laws began with a meeting of clubs held on 5 June 1874 in Sydney at Gannon’s Oxford Hotel. The clubs present at the first meeting were Wallaroo, Goulburn, Waratah FC, Balmain, The King’s School, Newington College, Camden College and St Leonards (North Shore). The SRFU was renamed the New South Wales Rugby Union (NSWRU) in 1892.

=== District rugby clubs in Sydney ===
The Sydney club landscape changed permanently ahead of the 1900 season when the Metropolitan Rugby Union introduced a "District Scheme" using strict residential qualification rules where footballers were only permitted to play with the newly created local club for their allocated area. This brought into being current Shute Shield clubs Eastern Suburbs, Northern Suburbs and West Harbour, along with now defunct districts Glebe, Balmain, South Sydney and Newtown. As a consequence all of the Sydney region's existing clubs (at all levels) were forced out of existence, including 1899 premiership winner Wallaroo FC, with only the Sydney University FC granted an exemption. In 1901 a number of the disbanded and/or new rugby clubs established a new unofficial body outside of the NSWRU called the City and Suburban Association, a forerunner to the present day NSW Suburban Rugby Union ("Subbies Rugby') competitions and its affiliated rugby clubs.

An event that was to greatly shape rugby union's future in NSW was the onset of World War I in 1914. Rugby competitions were suspended due to an overwhelmingly high percentage of rugby players enlisting to serve in the Australian Imperial Force. The NSWRU also established the Rugby Union Rifle Club in Sydney in 1915, an organisation to assist in the training of the rugby men (current and retired) in military skills and physical fitness, to aid and encourage enlistment and local protection roles. This involved each of the first grade rugby clubs forming their own rifle club arm, including Eastern Suburbs Rugby Union Rifle Club, Northern Suburbs and Sydney University. The rugby men trained in marksmanship, drill and bayonet work, often combined with inter-club competitions, as well as rugby matches. Similar clubs were formed in the major centres of NSW and Queensland that had rugby union clubs. Such was its success, the movement fell away as most participants had enlisted. A Sydney newspaper reported: "According to figures prepared by Mr W. W. Hill, secretary of the NSWRU, 197 out of 220 regular first grade players are on active service, or 90 percent."

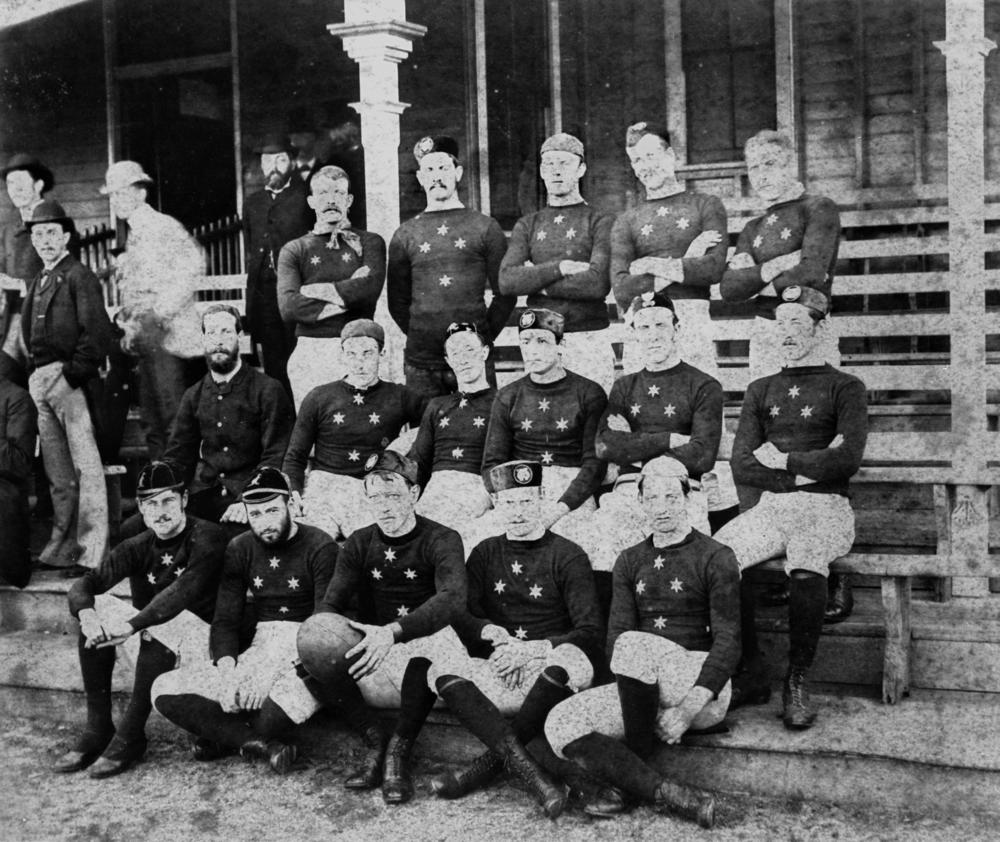
New South Wales team, ca. 1883

== Participation ==
Registered players
2019	2023/24
56,987	35,043

== New South Wales state team ==
Waratahs colours

The New South Wales Waratahs team is the representative team of the NSWRU. Their debut game was in 1882 against Queensland (now Reds) and the first NSW team captain was James Brodie of the Wallaroo FC. The team has traditionally always worn light blue jerseys since 1891. In 1927-28 the Waratahs conducted a world tour encompassing Sri Lanka, Great Britain, France and Canada. The Waratahs have competed in the transnational Super Rugby competition since the start of the professional era of rugby in 1996.

== Competitions ==
=== Super Rugby ===
The New South Wales Waratahs play in the Super Rugby competition against other professional teams from Australia, South Africa, New Zealand and Argentina. The Waratahs team won the Super Rugby title for the first time in 2014, after having previously reached the final in 2005 and 2008.

=== National Rugby Championship ===
New South Wales has two teams in the National Rugby Championship:

- New South Wales Country
- Sydney

=== Shute Shield ===
Premiership Rugby is contested in Sydney across four senior grades and three colts competitions. Club Championship trophies are also contested on overall results. The Shute Shield is the trophy for the first grade premiership competition, and the eleven clubs currently competing for the premiership are:

- Eastern Suburbs
- Eastwood
- Gordon
- Manly
- Northern Suburbs
- Randwick
- Southern Districts
- Sydney University
- Warringah
- West Harbour
- Western Sydney

Over the many years of competition for the NSW premiership, a number of formerly notable clubs became defunct. Some of the early ones include: Glebe (Australian Club Champions in 1908), Pirates, The Sydney Football Club (est. 1865), and Wallaroos.

The Tooheys New Cup, which was the other recent first grade competition, ran from 2002 to 2006. An abbreviated Shute Shield competition was played in the latter part of the season during those years. When the Tooheys New Cup competition was disbanded, the Shute Shield competition was expanded again for the 2007 season.

=== Suburban rugby ===
Below the NSWRU grade competition is the New South Wales Suburban Rugby Union (commonly known as Subbies). With over 6,000 players and 55 clubs this is believed to be the largest centrally organised rugby union competition in the world.

=== Country Rugby ===
Cockatoos colours

The New South Wales Country Rugby Union is affiliated with the NSWRU and administers game in the majority of non-metropolitan areas of NSW. The union is split into nine zones with 100 clubs and over 16,000 players. NSW Country is represented by the New South Wales Country Cockatoos team.

=== Women's Rugby ===
Club competitions for women's 15-a-side teams are run in Sydney and Newcastle. A representative team from Sydney is regularly selected to play the NSW Country Corellas and the Australian Army women's team. The NSWRU also sends women's 15-a-side and 7-a-side representative teams to the ARU National Championships each year. The six clubs in the Sydney women's competition, as of 2014, are:

- Parramatta Two Blues
- Penrith Emus
- Rockdale Rangers
- Sydney University
- Warringah Rugby Club
- Waverley Rugby Club

=== Schoolboy Rugby ===
The Waratah Shield is a rugby union knock-out competition for high school teams from New South Wales, Australia. First contested in 1963, it is organised by New South Wales Rugby Union in conjunction with NSW Schools' Rugby Union and NSW Combined High Schools and attracts around 100 entries each year.

=== Taki Toa Shield ===
The Taki Toa Shield is a rugby union tournament played among semi-professional clubs and an invitational New Zealand Māori community team in Sydney which started in 1983.

== Bibliography ==
- Hickie, Tom V (1983). The Game for the Game Itself; The Development of Sub-District Rugby in Sydney. Sydney Sub-Districts Rugby Union. ISBN 978-0959194104.
- Horton, Peter A (1990). A history of Rugby Union football in Queensland 1882-1891 (PhD thesis 101MB). The University of Queensland.
- Mulford, John G. (2005). Guardians of the Game: The History of the New South Wales Rugby Union 1874-2004. ABC Books. ISBN 0-7333-1625-5.
