= Siaosi Taimani Fotu =

Tongan politician

Minister of Works and Police

Minister without Portfolio

Personal details
- Died: 30 August 1967 Nukuʻalofa, Tonga

Siaosi Taimani Fotu (died 30 August 1967) was a Tongan politician and magistrate. He served as Minister of Works and Police and Minister without Portfolio during the 1950s and 1960s.

== Biography ==
After serving as a Police Magistrate in Nukuʻalofa, Taimani was appointed to the cabinet during the reign of Sālote Tupou III, serving as both Minister of Works and Police and Minister without Portfolio. He was also involved with the church, and was appointed by Salote to the Tonga Traditions Committee.

Taimani died in Nukuʻalofa in August 1967 at the age of 82, and was given a state funeral. He was married with one child, 'Oto'ota 'Eva. His wife had died in 1956.
