= New South Wales Rugby Union =

Rugby union governing body in New South Wales, Australia

NSW Rugby Union
- Sport: Rugby union
- Founded: 1874; 152 years ago (Note: Known as the “New South Wales Rugby Union” since 1893.)
- ARFU affiliation: 1949; 77 years ago
- Headquarters: Daceyville, Sydney, New South Wales
- Location: 33.9298°S 151.2241°E
- Chairman: Anthony Crawford
- President: Matt Burke
- Website: nsw.rugby

The New South Wales Rugby Union (NSWRU), formerly known as the Southern Rugby Football Union (SRFU) between 1874 and 1892, is the governing body of rugby union within most of the state of New South Wales in Australia. It is a member and founding union of Rugby Australia, known as the Australian Rugby Football Union (ARFU) at the time of its founding in 1949. Within Australia the NSW state body is considered the strongest Union. It has the largest player base, biggest population, most suburban clubs, and the oldest running club rugby competition in the country. The New South Wales Rugby Union is the third oldest continuous rugby union ever, behind only the Rugby Football Union (RFU 1871) and the Scottish Rugby Union (SRU 1873).

The southern areas of New South Wales encompassing the Monaro, Far South Coast, and Southern Inland unions are no longer affiliated with the NSWRU. They are now within the ACT and Southern NSW Rugby Union.

The first meeting to form the New South Wales Rugby Union (then called the Southern Rugby Football Union) and adopt the playing laws of the Rugby Football Union was held between clubs on 5 June 1874. The clubs present were Wallaroo, The King’s School, Newington College, Goulburn, Waratah, Balmain, St Leonards (North Sydney) and Camden College. Sydney University missed the first meeting. The clubs over June-July 1874 drafted explanatory text to support local understanding of the fifty-nine rugby union laws. The Union's first general meeting was held on 28 July 1874 where newly formed clubs Mudgee and Victoria (South Sydney) were also present. The uniform playing laws then came into immediate effect.

At this early stage the Union had no other role, until through the 1880s it began to be involved in organising Sydney club competitions, regional branches and representative teams and visits.

== Structure ==
=== Clubs ===
- Super Rugby Pacific:
- • New South Wales Waratahs
- Shute Shield:
- • Eastern Suburbs
- • Eastwood
- • Gordon
- • Manly
- • Northern Suburbs
- • Western Sydney Two Blues
- • Southern Districts
- • Sydney University
- • Warringah
- • West Harbour
- • Hunter Wildfires

== Jurisdiction ==
Due to the merging of Union's by the ACT and Southern NSW Rugby Union, the New South Wales Rugby Union does not encompass all of New South Wales. However, it does include major cities and towns, making up roughly two-thirds (and/or more) of the state. Such cities and towns include: Newcastle, the Central Coast, Wollongong, Coffs Harbour, Port Macquarie, Tamworth, Orange, Dubbo, Bathurst, Lismore, Tweed Heads, Byron Bay, and Sydney.

New South Wales Rugby Union jurisdiction

== See also ==
- Rugby union in New South Wales
- New South Wales Waratahs
