= List of rugby union clubs in Australia =

- Governing body: Rugby Australia
- First played: 25 July 1839, Sydney, New South Wales
- Registered players: 82,818 (total); 38,010 (adult)
- Clubs: 848

Club competitions
- Super Rugby; Shute Shield; Queensland Premier Rugby; ACTRU Premier Division; Dewar Shield

Audience records
- Single match: 109,874; Australia v New Zealand, (Telstra Stadium); 15 July 2000

The highest level of provincial rugby union in Australia is Super Rugby. There are five Australian teams in this competition, which also features teams from New Zealand and Fiji.

Australia currently has no national club competition. The first attempt at such a competition, the Australian Rugby Championship, was launched in 2007 with eight teams, but lasted only one season before the nation's governing body, the Australian Rugby Union (now Rugby Australia), decided to discontinue the competition due to financial losses. The second and most recent attempt at forming a national domestic league, the National Rugby Championship, was launched in 2014 with nine teams and lasted six years until it was disbanded in 2020. The current top level competitions in Australia are the Shute Shield in Sydney and the Queensland Premier League in Brisbane. Numerous club and representative competitions serve the rugby playing community below these two competitions.

While there were rugby clubs in Melbourne in 1858 (who became Australian rules clubs), the first formed forerunners of today's rugby union clubs in Australia began in 1870 in Sydney with the Wallaroo FC and Sydney University FC. The first association of clubs was founded in Sydney in 1874 and called the Southern Rugby Football Union (SRFU). The clubs and schools present at the first SRFU meeting were Wallaroo, Goulburn, Waratah FC, Balmain, The King’s School, Newington College, Camden College and St Leonards (North Shore). The SRFU was renamed the New South Wales Rugby Union (NSWRU) in 1892.

Many foundation dates displayed on Australian rugby club badges and websites citing the late 19th century reflect the broader local rugby provenance of the area or a namesake predecessor, rather than an unbroken, continuous history of the current club.

== Super Rugby ==
- New South Wales Waratahs
- Queensland Reds
- ACT Brumbies
- Western Force

Former:

- Melbourne Rebels (2011-2024)

== National Competitions ==
=== National Rugby Championship ===
The National Rugby Championship (2014−2020) was a former annual competition held between professional teams from each state.

- Brisbane City
- Canberra Vikings
- Melbourne Rising
- New South Wales Country Eagles
- Western Force
- Queensland Country
- Sydney Rays
- Sydney Stars (2014–2015)
- Perth Spirit (2014–2017)
- Greater Sydney Rams (2014–2017)

=== Australian Rugby Shield/NRC Division 2 ===
The Australian Rugby Shield (2000-2008) and NRC Division 2 (2018-2020) were former annual competitions held between amateur representative teams from each state.

- ACT & Southern NSW Vikings (only in Australian Rugby Shield)
- Adelaide Black Falcons
- Northern Territory Mosquitoes
- Victoria Country Barbarians (formerly Melbourne Axemen)
- New South Wales Country Cockatoos
- Perth Gold
- Queensland Country Heelers
- Tasmania Jack Jumpers

== New South Wales and Australian Capital Territory ==
=== New South Wales Rugby Union ===
==== Shute Shield ====
- Eastern Suburbs
- Eastwood
- Gordon
- Hunter Wildfires
- Manly
- Northern Suburbs
- Parramatta
- Randwick
- Southern Districts
- Sydney University
- Warringah
- West Harbour

Former:

- Central Coast Waves
- Canberra Kookaburras
- Penrith
- Wallaroo FC

==== New South Wales Country Rugby Union ====
===== Central Coast Rugby Union =====
- Avoca Beach
- Gosford Kariong
- Lake Macquarie
- Northlakes United
- Ourimbah Razorbacks
- Terrigal
- The Bay
- Warnervale
- Woy Woy

Former:

- The Entrance
- Gosford
- Kariong

===== Central Northern Rugby Union =====
- Barraba Rams & Gwydir River Rats
- Gunnedah Red Devils
- Inverell Highlanders
- Moree Weebolla Bulls
- Narrabri Blue Boars
- Quirindi Lions
- Scone Brumbies
- Tamworth Pirates
- Walcha Rams

Former:

- Tamworth Rugby Union Sporting Club
- Croppa Creek Crows

===== Central West Rugby Union =====
- Bathurst Bulldogs
- Bathurst City
- Blayney
- Canowindra Pythons
- Coolah
- Coonabarabran Kookaburras
- Cowra Eagles
- CSU - Bathurst
- Cudal Cobras
- Dubbo Kangaroos
- Dubbo Rhinos
- Forbes Platypi
- Geurie Goats Rugby Club
- Molong Magpies
- Mudgee Wombats
- Narromine Gorillas
- Orange City
- Orange Emus
- Orange Waratahs
- Parkes Boars
- Trangie Tigers
- USO - Orange
- Wellington Redbacks
- Yeoval

Former:

- Blackheath Wildfires
- Cudal
- Lithgow Devils
- Oberon
- Rydal Razorbacks

===== Far North Coast Rugby Union =====
- Ballina
- Bangalow
- Byron Bay
- Casino
- Casuarina
- Evans River
- Iluka
- Kyogle
- Lennox Head
- Lismore
- Mullumbimby
- Murwillumbah
- Richmond Range
- Southern Cross University
- Wollongbar/Alstonville
- Woolgoolga Whitepointers
- Yamba

===== Illawarra Rugby Union =====
- Albion Park
- Avondale
- Bowral
- Bundanoon
- Camden Rams
- Lions Rugby
- Kiama
- Shamrocks
- Shoalhaven
- Tech Waratahs
- University
- Vikings
- Wollondilly

===== Mid North Coast Rugby Union =====
Northern Division:

- Bishop-Druitt College Coffs Harbour Barracudas
- Bowraville Goannas
- Coffs Harbour Snappers
- Grafton Redmen
- Hastings Valley Vikings
- Kempsey Cannonballs
- Port Macquarie Pirates
- Southern Cross University Marlins

Southern Division:

- Forster-Tuncurry Dolphins
- Gloucester Cockatoos
- Manning River Ratz
- Old Bar Clams
- Wallamba Bulls
- Wauchope Thunder

Former:

- Urunga-Bellinger valley rugby club (Northern)
- Nambucca River Breakers R.U.F.C (Northern)

===== New England Rugby Union =====
- Glen Innes Rugby Club
- Robb Rugby Club
- St Albert's College Rugby Club
- Armidale Blues Rugby Club
- Barbarians R.U.F.C.
- Walcha R.U.F.C.
- Tamworth Rugby Union Sporting Club

Former:

- Armidale City
- Armidale Old Boys
- City United
- Earle Page College
- Guy Fawkes Ebor
- Guyra Ghosts
- Gwydir River Rats
- Hillgrove
- Page-Wright Barbarians
- Teachers College
- Tenterfield Bumblebees
- University College
- United Colleges
- Uralla Miners
- Wright College Redmen

City-United Historical note: During the 1994 pre-season, it became clear that neither United nor Armidale City would have enough players to field four grades or be competitive. Given that quite a few of City's squad were former United players, NERU Secretary and former United President Dick Croft encouraged the two clubs to join forces, and City United was born. The new club competed strongly for the next eight years before merging with Armidale Old Boys for the 2002 season. This resulted in the new Armidale Blues Rugby Club, which combines the history and tradition of City, the professionalism and competitiveness of Old Boys, and the spirit and student depth of United.

===== Newcastle and Hunter Rugby Union =====
- Singleton
- Nelson Bay
- Waratahs
- Wanderers
- Merewether Carlton Rugby Club
- Hamilton Hawks
- University
- Maitland
- Southern Beaches
- Muswellbrook
- Pokolbin
- Southern Lakes
- Griffins

===== Southern Inland Rugby Union =====
This union is also affiliated with the ACT union instead of a NSW body.

===== Western Plains Rugby Union =====
- Bourke Rams
- Brewarrina Brumbies
- Cobar Camels
- Coonamble Rams
- Gulargambone Galahs
- Bogan Bulls (Nyngan)
- Walgett Rams
- Warren Pumas

==== New South Wales Suburban Rugby Union ====
Division 1

- Blue Mountains Rugby Club
- Colleagues
- Drummoyne
- Hunters Hill Rugby Club
- Lindfield
- Mosman
- Newport
- Waverley

Division 2

- Briars
- Forest
- Petersham
- Sydney Irish
- St Patrick's
- University of New South Wales Rugby union Club

Division 3

- Beecroft
- Blacktown
- Hills
- Hornsby
- Knox
- Lane Cove Old Ignatians Rugby Football Club

Division 4

- Balmain
- Chatswood
- Kings Old Boys
- Macquarie Uni
- St Ives
- Wakehurst

Division 5 - McLean Cup

- Canterbury Rugby Club
- Epping
- Hawkesbury Valley Rugby Club
- Maccabi
- Redfield Old Boys Rugby Club
- Renegades Rugby
- Sydney Harlequins Rugby Football Club
- Western Raptors Rugby Club

Division 6 - Meldrum Cup

- Burraneer Rugby Club
- Georges River Rugby Club
- Manly Savers Rugby Club
- Merrylands Rugby Club
- North Cronulla S.L.S.C.
- Oatley Rugby Club
- Penrith Rugby Club
- Sydney Harbour Rugby Club

Clubs not currently competing with first grade XVs

- Old Barker Rugby Club
- Collaroy
- Dee Why
- ICMS
- Lane Cove
- Roseville
- Terrey Hills
- UWS Hawkesbury
- Brothers
- Colleagues Convicts
- Alexandria
- Engadine
- Clovelly
- Fairvale/Lansvale
- Menai
- Wollondilly

== Australian Capital Territory (including areas of southern New South Wales) ==
=== ACT and Southern NSW Rugby Union ===
==== ACTRU Premier Division ====
- Easts
- Gungahlin Eagles
- Queanbeyan Whites
- Canberra Royals
- Tuggeranong Vikings
- Uni-Norths Owls
- Wests Lions

The following teams compete in first and second division competitions

- Boorowa Rugby Club
- Bungendore RUFC
- Cooma Rugby Club
- Crookwell Rugby Club
- Defence Academy Rugby Club
- Goulburn Rugby Union
- Hall Rugby Club
- Harden RUFC
- Jindabyne Rugby Club
- RMC Rugby Club
- Taralga RUFC
- Yass RUFC

==== South Coast Zone ====
- Batemans Bay RUFC
- Bega Valley RUFC
- Bermagui-Cobargo Sharks RC
- Bombala Rugby Club
- Braidwood RUFC
- Broulee Dolphins RUFC
- Milton Rugby Club
- Narooma & Districts Whales RC

==== Southern Inland Zone ====
- Albury-Wodonga RUFC
- Cootamundra RUFC
- Denilquin Drovers
- Grenfell Rugby Club
- Griffith RUFC
- Hay Cutters
- Leeton Phantoms RUFC
- Rivcoll Red RUFC
- Temora RUFC
- Tumut RUFC
- Wagga Agricultural College RUFC
- Wagga City RUFC
- Wagga Wagga Crows Junior Rugby Union
- Wagga Waratahs RUFC
- West Wyalong Junior Rugby Union
- Young RUFC

== Northern Territory ==
=== Northern Territory Rugby Union ===
==== Darwin Club Rugby ====
The following clubs run teams in both A and B Grade Men's competitions and a team in the Women's competition:

- Casuarina Cougars
- Darwin Dragons
- Palmerston Crocs
- South Darwin Rabbitohs
- Swampdogs
- University Pirates

==== Central Australian Club Competition ====
- Dingo Cubs RUFC
- Devils RUFC
- Eagles RUFC
- Kiwi Warriors RUFC

== Queensland ==
=== Queensland Rugby Union ===
==== Queensland Premier Rugby ====
- Brothers Old Boys
- Easts Tigers Rugby Union
- Bond University Rugby Club
- GPS
- North Brisbane Rugby Club
- Souths
- Sunnybank Rugby Union Club
- University of Queensland Rugby Club
- Wests

==== Queensland Country Rugby Union ====
===== Bundaberg and District Rugby Union =====
- Alloway Falcons
- Bundaberg Barbarians
- East Coast Buccaneers
- Isis Crushers

===== Cairns and District Rugby Union =====
- Barron-Trinity Bulls
- Brothers Rugby Union (Cairns)
- Cairns Old Crocs Rugby Union
- Cairns Wanderers
- Innisfail & District Rugby
- JCU Mariners
- Port Douglas Rugby Union
- Southside Crusaders Sports & Culture
- Tablelands Rugby

===== Central Highlands Rugby Union =====
- Capella Rugby Union
- Clermont Rugby Union
- Emerald Rugby
- Moranbah Bulls
- Rolleston Rugby Union

===== Central Queensland Rugby Union =====
- Biloela Rugby
- Blackwater Rugby
- Brothers Rugby Union (Rockhampton)
- Capricorn Coast Rugby
- Colts Rugby Club
- Dawson Valley Rugby Club
- Frenchville Pioneers
- Gladstone Rugby Club
- Mount Morgan Rugby
- Rockhampton Boars
- University Central Queensland Rugby

===== Darling Downs Rugby Union =====
- Condamine Rugby Union
- Dalby and District Rugby Union Football Club
- Goondiwindi Rugby
- Highfields Redbacks Rugby Union
- Roma Rugby Union
- South Burnett Rugby
- St George & District Rugby
- Toowoomba Bears Rugby
- Toowoomba Rangers Rugby
- University Of Southern Queensland Rugby
- Warwick & Districts Rugby

===== Mackay District Rugby Union =====
- Bowen Rugby
- Brothers Rugby Union (Mackay)
- City Rugby Club (Mackay)
- Kuttabul Rugby
- Proserpine/Whitsunday Rugby Union
- Slade Point Rugby

===== Mt Isa Rugby Union =====
- Cloncurry Rugby
- Euros Rugby Union
- Keas Rugby
- Warrigals Rugby

===== Gold Coast District Rugby Union =====
- Beaudesert Rugby Football Club
- Bond University Rugby Club
- Bond Pirates Rugby Club
- Casuarina Beach Rugby Club
- Colleges Rugby Club
- Coolangatta Tweed Barbarians
- Coomera Crushers RU
- Gold Coast Eagles
- Griffith University Colleges Knights Rugby Union Club
- Helensvale Hogs RUC
- Hinterland Celtics Rugby Club
- Nerang Bulls RUC
- Palm Beach Currumbin Alleygators RUC
- Surfers Paradise Dolphins
- Tamborine Mountain Rugby

===== Sunshine Coast Rugby Union =====
- Caboolture Rugby Union
- Caloundra Rugby Union
- Fraser Coast Rugby Union
- Gympie Rugby Union
- Maroochydore Rugby Union
- Nambour Rugby Union
- Noosa District Rugby Union
- University of the Sunshine Coast Rugby Union

===== Townsville and Districts Rugby Union =====
- Brothers Rugby Union (Townsville)
- Burdekin Rugby Union
- Charters Towers Rugby Union
- Ingham Rugby Union
- James Cook University of North Queensland Rugby Union
- North Ward Old Boys Rugby
- Ross River Redskins
- Teachers West Rugby Union
- Western Suburbs Rugby Union

===== Western Queensland Rugby Union =====
- Barcaldine Rugby Union
- Collegians Rugby Union
- Longreach Rugby Union

==== Queensland Suburban Rugby Union ====
List does not include Queensland Premier Rugby clubs that also field teams in the Suburban competitions.

- Ag Vet Rugby Union
- Beenleigh and District Rugby Union
- Brisbane Irish Rugby Football Club
- Easts Longhorns Rugby Union
- Everton Park Rugby Union
- Goodna Rugby Union
- Ipswich Rangers Rugby Club
- Logan City Rugby Union
- Med XV Rugby Union
- Nerang Rugby Union
- Pine Rivers Boars Rugby Union
- Pine Rivers Pumas Rugby Union
- Redcliffe Rugby Union
- Redlands Rugby Union
- Riverside Rugby Union Club
- Southern Bay Rugby Union
- Springfield Rugby Union
- St Leo's College Old Boys Rugby Union
- TC Beirne School of Law Rugby Union
- UQ - Gatton Rugby Union
- Wynnum Rugby Union Club

== South Australia ==
=== Rugby Union South Australia ===
==== SA Club Rugby ====
- Adelaide University RUFC
- Barossa Rams RUFC
- Brighton RUFC
- Burnside RUFC
- Elizabeth RUFC
- North East Districts RUFC
- North Torrens RUFC
- Old Collegians Rugby Club
- Onkaparinga RUFC
- Port Adelaide RUFC
- Souths Suburbs RUFC
- Woodville RUFC

== Tasmania ==
=== Tasmanian Rugby Union ===
- Australian Maritime College Rugby Union Club
- Burnie Emus
- Devonport Bulls
- Eastern Suburbs Roosters
- Glenorchy Stags
- Hobart Harlequins
- Hobart Lions
- Launceston Bees
- Taroona Blues
- University of Tasmania Redmen

== Victoria ==
=== Rugby Victoria ===
- Victorian Club Rugby
- Ballarat Rugby Union Football Club
- Bendigo Rugby Club
- Border Army RUFC
- Boroondara RUFC
- Box Hill Rugby Club
- Cerberus RUFC
- Cobram Rugby Union Club
- Deniliquin RUFC
- Echuca Moama Barbarians
- Eltham Rugby Club
- Endeavour Hills Rugby Club
- Footscray Rugby Club
- Geelong Rugby Club
- Harlequin Rugby Club
- Kiwi Hawthorn Rugby Union
- Maroondah RUFC
- Melbourne Unicorns
- Melbourne University Rugby Football Club
- Melton Rugby Club
- Monash University Rugby Club
- Moorabbin Rugby Club
- Northern Rugby Club
- Power House RUFC
- Puckapunyal Rugby Club
- Shepparton Rugby Union Club
- Southern Districts RUFC
- Warrnambool Plovers Rugby Union Club
- Wyndham City Rhinos RUC

== Western Australia ==
=== Rugby Western Australia ===
==== RugbyWA Competition ====
- Arks Rugby Club
- Associates Rugby Club
- Bunbury Rugby Club
- Cottesloe Rugby Club
- Curtin University Rugby Union Football Club
- Joondalup Brothers RUFC
- Kalamunda Rugby Club
- Mandurah Rugby Club
- North Coast Rugby Union
- Midland Hills Rugby Club
- Nedlands Rugby Club
- Palmyra Rugby Club
- Perth Bayswater Rugby Club
- Rockingham Rugby Club
- Southern Lions RUFC
- University of Western Australia RUFC
- Wanneroo Rugby Club
- Wests Subiaco RUFC

==== WA Country RU ====
===== Eastern Goldfields WA Competition =====
- Boulder RUFC
- Bushwackers RUFC
- Esperance RUFC
- Kalgoorlie Stormers Rugby Club
- Kambalda RUFC

===== Great Southern Rugby Union =====
- Albany RUFC
- Denmark Brothers RC
- Dryandra-Narrogin RUFC
- Katanning RC

===== Northern Division RU =====
- Geraldton Internationals RC
- Paraburdoo RC

===== South West WA Competition =====
- Bridgetown RUFC
- Bunbury City RUFC
- Collie RC
- Dunsborough RUFC
- Leeuwin-Margaret River RUFC

== Other teams ==
- Australian Police Rugby Union
- Australian Schools Rugby Union

== See also ==
- List of basketball clubs in Australia
- List of cricket clubs in Australia
- List of rowing clubs in Australia
- List of yacht clubs in Australia
- List of Australian rugby union stadiums by capacity
- List of Australian club rugby union competitions
- Rugby Union in Australia
