= List of Australian club rugby union competitions =

In Australia, what is considered the third tier of Rugby is often referred to as club rugby, grade rugby or premier rugby. Club Rugby often focuses on the major metropolitan areas of the respective unions, with teams representing various districts and suburbs. The teams represented in the first grade can and have changed over time, and are open to change at the discretion of the governing body.

== Sydney Premiership ==
The Shute Shield is a rugby union competition in Sydney, New South Wales. It is the premier grade rugby trophy in Sydney rugby. The shield is contested by 11 Sydney Rugby Union clubs and one from Newcastle and Hunter Rugby Union.

The first Sydney club competition was held in 1874, contested by Balmain, Newington College, University of Sydney and The King's School, Parramatta. The Shute Shield is seen as the traditional successor to this competition.

The shield was donated to the New South Wales Rugby Union in 1923 by Sydney University Football Club, and was named in honour of Robert Elliott Stewart Shute who died while playing for The Rest v NSW XV on 5 June 1922.

Current clubs

Club	Colour	Jersey	Nickname	Region	Est.	Premierships	Most recent	Note(s)
Eastern Suburbs			Beasties	Rose Bay (Eastern Suburbs)	1900	10	2024; 2 years ago	(Note: Competed in the Sydney rugby premiership every season since 1900, apart from when relegated to the 2nd division in 1981 and 1984.)
Eastwood			Woodies	Marsfield (Hills District)	1947	6	2015; 11 years ago	(Note: Promoted to the Sydney rugby premiership in 1947, and competed in the premiership every season since then, apart from when relegated to the 2nd division in 1981. Epping Subbies and Eastwood subbies combined to create Eastwood Rugby.)
Gordon			Highlanders, Stags	Chatswood (North Shore)	1936	9	2020; 6 years ago	(Note: Not linked to the Gordon club that won the Sydney premiership in 1886. Competed in the Sydney rugby premiership every season since 1936, and never relegated to 2nd division.)
Manly			Marlins	Manly (Northern Beaches)	1906	7	1997; 29 years ago	(Note: Competed in the Sydney rugby premiership every season since 1906, and never relegated to 2nd division.)
Northern Suburbs			Shoremen, Norths	North Sydney (Lower North Shore)	1900	7	2016; 10 years ago	(Note: Originally formed as North Sydney. Competed in the Sydney rugby premiership every season since 1900, except for 1919 and when relegated to 2nd division from 1982–1989. Changed name to Northern Suburbs in 1928.)
Western Sydney Two Blues			Two Blues	Merrylands (Parramatta)	1934	3	1986; 40 years ago	(Note: Originally formed in 1879 as Cumberland, then played as Parramatta, in the Sydney rugby premiership up until the end of the 1899 season. Re-joined Sydney premiership in 1934 and played every season since. Never relegated to 2nd division. Rebranded as the Western Sydney Two Blues for the 2020 season.)
Randwick			Galloping Greens, The Wicks	Coogee (Eastern Suburbs)	1914	29	2023; 3 years ago	(Note: Originally formed in 1882 and played in the Sydney rugby premiership up to the end of the 1899 season, winning 4 premierships. Re-joined Sydney premiership in 1914, but did not play from 1919–22. Played every season since then and never relegated to 2nd division. Has won 28 premierships in post-1900 Sydney rugby premiership.)
Southern Districts			Rebels, Souths	Sylvania Waters (Sutherland Shire)	1989	0		(Note: Formed from merger of St. George (founded 1906) and Port Hacking (founded 1957 as North Cronulla SLSC rugby club).)
Sydney University			Students	Camperdown (Inner West)	1900	33	2022; 4 years ago	(Note: Originally formed in 1863 and played in the Sydney rugby premiership from its start in 1874, winning 9 premierships up until the end of the 1899 season. Competed in the Sydney rugby premiership every season since 1900, except for when relegated to 2nd division in 1979 and 1983. Has won 32 premierships in post-1900 Sydney rugby premiership.)
Warringah			Rats	Warriewood (Northern Beaches)	1963	2	2025; 1 year ago	(Note: Formed in 1963 and played in 2nd division from 1964–1970, then promoted to 1st division in 1971. Never relegated to 2nd division.)
West Harbour			Pirates	Concord (Inner West)	1900	2	1929; 97 years ago	(Note: Originally formed as Western Suburbs. Competed in the Sydney rugby premiership every season from 1900 except for 1919, until relegated at the end of 1951. Played in the Sydney Sub-Districts competition (now the NSWSRU competition) from 1952–1961, then joined the 2nd division when it started in 1962. Played in 2nd division from 1962–65, then promoted to 1st division in 1966 and remained in the Sydney rugby premiership since, except for when relegated to 2nd division in 1980. Changed name to West Harbour in 1995.)
Hunter			Wildfires	Newcastle (Hunter Region) Location is outside the Sydney-Metro and outer-region area.	1995	0		(Note: Played in Sydney rugby premiership as 'Newcastle Wildfires' from 1995–1999. Re-admitted as Hunter Wildfires in 2020.)

== Queensland Premier Rugby ==
Queensland Premier Rugby is the top club competition in Queensland. Nine clubs take part: eight from Brisbane and a club each from the Gold Coast.

The first club rugby competition in Queensland was the Hospital Football Challenge, which began in 1899. It was an annual fund-raising venture for the Brisbane Hospital, but the game fell away during and after WWI, and rugby union was abandoned in Queensland after 1919.

The competition was restored in 1929 and the original trophy, the magnificent Hospital Cup became the premiership trophy again. It is now awarded to the winner of the Premier Rugby grand final.

Teams in Queensland Premier Rugby
Est.	Club	Location	Home Ground	Nickname	Admitted to Premier Grade	Premierships (most recent)
1996	Bond University	Gold Coast (Varsity Lakes)	Bond University Field	Breakers	1997	2 (2025) (in 2004 as Gold Coast Breakers)
1905	Brothers	North-East Suburbs (Albion)	Jack Ross Oval	Butcher Boys, The Brethren, The Filth	1905	30 (2024)
1947	Eastern Districts	Eastern Suburbs (Coorparoo)	David Wilson Field	Tigers, Easts	1950	5 (2020)
1931	GPS Old Boys	Inner West (Ashgrove)	Ashgrove Sports Ground	Jeeps	1931	6 (2018)
1931	North Brisbane	North Brisbane (Wooloowin)	Hugh Courtney Oval	Eagles, Norths	1991 (1933 — Eagle Jctn, 1961 — Teachers, 1974 — Teachers-Norths)	2 (1976)
1911	University of Queensland	Inner West (St Lucia)	University Field 5A	Red Heavies, The Students	1912	33 (2021)
1948	Southern Districts	Southern Brisbane (Annerley)	R.A. "Chipsy" Wood Oval	Magpies, Souths	1948	10 (2015)
1969	Sunnybank	Sunnybank and Logan	Oldmac Oval, Macgregor	Dragons	1989	3 (2011)
1951	West Brisbane	Inner West (Toowong)	Sedgman Oval	Bulldogs, Wests	1955	4 (2022)

== ACTRU Premier Division ==
The ACTRU Premier Division is the top rugby club competition in Canberra. It is conducted by the region's governing body, the ACT and Southern NSW Rugby Union.

The competition was first held in 1938. There are currently, six ACT clubs that compete in the top division. The trophy awarded to the winner of the grand final is the John I Dent Cup, named after the benefactor who donated it to the union. All of the finals are played at Viking Park.

Teams that compete for the John I Dent Cup
Est.	Club	Location	Home Ground	Nickname	Admitted to Premier Grade	Premierships (most recent)
1949	Canberra Royals	Woden Valley	Phillip Oval	Blue Baggers	1949	22 (2024)
1967	Gungahlin Eagles	Gungahlin	Nicholls Oval	Eagles	1967	4 (2023) (2 as Daramalan RUFC)
1965	Penrith Emus Rugby	Penrith	Nepean Rugby Park	The Emus	2022	
1954	Queanbeyan Whites	Queanbeyan	Campese Field	Whites	1955	8 (2022)
1973	Tuggeranong Vikings	Tuggeranong	Viking Park	Vikings	1973	14 (2018)
1988	Uni-Norths Owls	North Canberra	ANU North Oval	Owls	1988 (1938 – University, Norths)	9 (2025) (7 as Northern Suburbs)
1962	Wests Lions	Belconnen	Jamison Oval	Lions	1962	13 (2005)

== RugbyWA Premier Grade ==
The RugbyWA Premier Grade is contested by 14 teams from the Greater Perth Area.

The teams currently in the RugbyWA Premier Grade are:

RugbyWA Premier Grade
Est.	Club	Location	Home Ground	Premierships (most recent)
1975	ARKs Harrisdale Rugby Club	Harrisdale	Harrissdale Community Oval	N/A
1948	Associates	Swanbourne	Allen Park	10 (2024)
1893	Cottesloe Rugby Union Football Club	Cottesloe	Harvey Field	12 (2021)
1998	Joondalup Brothers Rugby Club	Joondalup	Arena Joondalup	N/A
Unknown	Kalamunda	Forrestfield	Hartfield Park	1 (2008)
1934	Nedlands	Nedlands	Charles Court Reserve	16 (2015)
1934	Palmyra	Alfred Cove	Tompkins Park	3 (2023)
1906	Perth Bayswater	Morley	Pat O'Hara Reserve	3 (2007) (1 as Perth-Suburbs)
1973	Rockingham	Rockingham	Lark Hill	N/A
Unknown	Southern Lions	Success	Success Oval	N/A
1929	UWA	Mount Claremont	UWA Sports Park	5 (2014)
1981	Wanneroo	Kingsway	Kingsway Reserve	1 (2025)
1930	Wests Scarborough Rugby Union Football Club	Doubleview	Bennett Park	12 (2022) (5 as Western Suburbs and 2 as Wests-Scarborough)

== Victorian Premier Division ==
The Dewar Shield is contested by 10 teams from the Greater Melbourne Area. After the first Round the Top Five teams continue competing for the Deward Shield and the Bottom Five compete for the Ward Shield

Teams that compete for the Dewar Shield
Est.	Colours	Club	Location	Home Ground	Nickname	Admitted to Premier Grade	Premierships (most recent)
1958		Box Hill	Box Hill	RHL Sparks Reserve	Broncos	1966	3 (2001)
1979		Endeavour Hills	Endeavour Hills	Frog Hollow Reserve	Eagles	2007	
1928		Footscray	Footscray	Henry Turner Memorial Reserve	Bulldogs	1928	3 (1937)
1928		Melbourne Harlequins	Ashwood	Ashwood Reserve	Quins	1930	12 (2023)
1909	Nátaga	Melbourne Unicorns	Armadale	Romanis Reserve, Orrong Park	Unicorns	1929	20 (2019)
1909		Melbourne University	Parkville	Royal Park	Students	1910	6 (1967)
1965		Moorabbin	Moorabbin	Keys Rd Reserve	Rams	1965	15 (2012)
1933		Power House	Albert Park	Noel Clarke Field	House, The Society	1936	14 (2026)
1923	.	Kiwi Hawthorn	Hawthorn	Lewin Reserve	Kiwis	1987, (1923 as The Kiwi Club)	13 (1996)
2011		Brimbank	Deer Park	Bon Thomas Reserve	Bucks	2026	

== South Australian Premier Grade ==
The Cooper Premier Grade is contested by 9 teams.

Teams that compete for the Cooper Premier Grade
Club	Nickname	Home Ground	Entered competition	Premierships (most recent)
University of Adelaide	Blacks	Waite Oval	1932	
Brighton RUFC	Tigers	Brighton Oval	1950	13 (2022)
Burnside RUFC	Burnside	Parkinson Oval	1946	5 (2025)
Elizabeth	Lizzies	Womma Park	1958	
Old Collegians RFC	Old Colls	Tregenza Oval	1936	4 (2016)
Onkaparinga RUFC	Onkas	Wilfred Taylor Reserve	1968	1 (2015)
Port Adelaide RUFC	Pirates	Riverside Oval	1933	1 (2002)
Southern Suburbs RUFC	Bulls	Bailey Reserve	1946	2 (2007)
Woodville RUFC	Wasps	Gleneagels Reserve	1933	

As of 2018, there are fourteen clubs which make up RUSA, eleven of these clubs field senior men's sides, eight field senior women's sides and 11 field junior sides. There is also a golden oldies club for players 35+, and a rugby sevens club for women and girls (12+).

== Tasmanian Division One ==
As at the end of 2019, there are 13 clubs which make up the TRU. Teams currently in the Tasmanian Division One are:

Club	Colours	Teams	Nickname(s)	Home Ground	Entered Union
Burnie RUFC	Blue & Red	Men's	Emus	Upper Burnie Sports Ground	1961 (reformed 1997)
Devonport RUFC	Green with Black	Men's, Women's, Junior's	Bulls	Don Oval	1964
Eastern Suburbs RUFC	Maroon with White	Men's, Women's, Juniors, Golden Oldies (35+)	Roosters, Chicks	North Warrane Oval	1964
Glenorchy RUFC	Black	Men's, Women's, Juniors	Stags	Eady Street Sports Ground	1935
Hobart Convicts RUFC	Grey & Black	Golden Oldies (35+)	Convicts	No set Ground	???
Hobart Harlequins RUFC	Green, Blue, Red & Black	Men's, Women's, Golden Oldies (35+)	Quins, Queens	Rugby Park	1933
Hobart Hutchins Lions RUFC	Grey, Black, Yellow & Magenta	Men's, Juniors (assoc. with The Hutchins School)	Lions	War Memorial Oval	1974
Launceston RUFC	Black & Red	Men's	Tigers	Royal Park	1999
North West RUFC	Purple with Black	Women's	Panthers	Upper Burnie Sports Ground	2018
Tamar Valley RUFC	Orange & Teal	Women's	Vixens	Royal Park	2017
Taroona RUFC	Blue & White	Mens, Women's, Juniors, Golden Oldies (35+)	Penguins	Rugby Park	1947
University of Tasmania RUFC	Red	Men's, Women's	Red Men, Red Women	UTAS Rugby Ground	1933
Australian Maritime College RUFC currently in recess	Light Blue with Royal Blue Trim	Men's	Vikings	Royal Park	2012

Ten of these clubs field senior men's sides, eight field senior women's sides, and five field junior sides. There is also a "golden oldies" club for players aged 35+.

== Darwin First Grade ==
The First Grade competition is contested by 5 teams from the Darwin area.

- Casuarina Cougars
- Darwin Dragons
- Palmerstown Crocs
- South Darwin Rabbitohs
- University Pirates

== Newcastle and Hunter Rugby Union Premiership ==
The Newcastle and Hunter Rugby Union is based around the NSW city of Newcastle, located ~160 km north of Sydney.

The earliest report of a football match in Newcastle was in 1860, when 'a lover of the old English games has offered one of Mrs. O’Hagan’s most fashionable bonnets as a prize to the fortunate party who shall give the winning (final) kick in a game of foot-ball, to be played on the new cricket ground, near St. John's Church'. A precursor to the formation of a local union, the Raysmith Challenge Cup was commenced in 1887 and was contested by Newcastle, Waratah, Advance, Orientals, Union, Ferndale, West Maitland, Raymond Terrace, East Maitland Imperial, Singleton and East Maitland clubs.

In 1888 the Northern Branch of the NSW Rugby Football Union was established, later renamed the Newcastle Rugby Union. The competition was suspended during World War 1, reforming in 1925. The 1925 competition comprised Cook's Hill Old Boys, Newcastle High School Old Boys, Great Public Schools' Old Boys (later Wanderers), Lysaght's Limited, Northern Suburbs and Mayfield. The NHRU currently sponsors Premier Rugby, Divisional Men’s, Social Men’s, Women’s, Juniors and Schools competitions. The 2019 Premier Rugby competition was contested by nine clubs across 3 men’s grades.

Premier Rugby Clubs in the NHRU (2019)

Club	Location	Home ground	Nickname	Founded (Seniors)
Hamilton	City West	Passmore Oval, Wickham	Hawks	1968
Lake Macquarie	North Lake Macquarie	Walters Park, Speers Point	Roos	1929 (as Boolaroo)
Maitland	Lower Hunter Valley	Marcellin Park, Lorn	Blacks	1872 (as Albion Football Club)
Merewether Carlton	City Beaches	Townson Oval, Merewether	Greens	1930 (as Cooks Hill Carlton 1887)
Nelson Bay	Port Stephens	Bill Strong Oval, Nelson Bay	Gropers	1983
Singleton	Upper Hunter Valley	Rugby Park, Singleton	Bulls	1967
Southern Beaches	Lake Macquarie Beaches	Ernie Calland Oval, Gateshead	Beaches	1997
University	University of Newcastle	Bernie Curran Oval, University Of Newcastle	Students	1955
Wanderers	City East	No 2 Sportsground, Cooks Hill	Two Blues	1924 (as GPS Old Boys)

== See also ==
- List of Australian rugby union stadiums by capacity
- List of Australian rugby union teams
