= History of rugby union in Australia =

Rugby union (rugby) has a long history in Australia, dating back to the late 1840s. The first formally established rugby rules club was the Wallaroo FC in Sydney in 1870. The same club led the formation in 1874 of the Southern Rugby Football Union (now the NSWRU), the first rugby union body outside of England (1871) and Scotland (1873), and later Queensland (1883). In the 1880s and 1890s the sport surged in popularity in both New South Wales and Queensland which, along with the later formed Australian Capital Territory (ACT), remain today as the code's strongholds in the country per the Waratahs (NSW), Reds (Queensland) and Brumbies (ACT).

Throughout the 20th century, Australia (the "Wallabies") became a top international team, frequently exchanging tours with rugby union in the British Isles, South Africa and New Zealand. Australia holds tier-one status with World Rugby and has been a core participant in the Tri Nations Series/Rugby Championship. Domestically the country has four professional teams that compete in the Super Rugby and runs its own separate competition known as Super Rugby AUS, organised by the governing body Rugby Australia (RA). Australia co-hosted the first Rugby World Cup (RWC) alongside trans-Tasman neighbour New Zealand in 1987. They were sole hosts of the 2003 edition and were awarded the hosting rights for 2027.

== Early history and nineteenth century ==
=== Pre-codification football ===
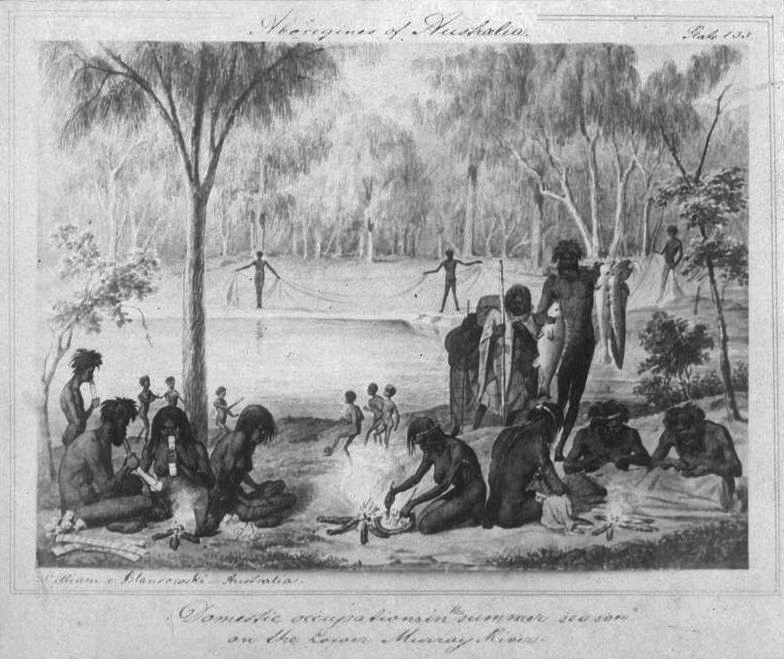
William Blandowski's 1857 depiction of traditional recreation of the Jarijari (Nyeri Nyeri) people near Merbein, Victoria, with a form of kick and catch game of football being played in the background.

There is some evidence of indigenous Australian forms of football being played in Australia, before the European arrival. Some of these involved kick and catch games. Early Europeans may well have played their own forms of traditional football as well, which involved kicking and handling. With the arrival of Europeans, a form of football was played very early on with matches being played in by 1829 in Sydney, Melbourne by 1840, Brisbane by 1849, and Tasmania by 1851. Most of these early games took part at local festivals, with no clear set of rules being used, and no codified version of any game being played.

The first reports of football being played in Australia date back to the 1820s when visiting ship crews would play army teams at Barrack Square (now Wynyard Park). In 1841 NSW Governor George Gipps threatened to ban football in Sydney if the playing of the game continued to flout Sunday observance standards.

The versions played locally in this period borrowed elements from the various codes that are present today including Australian rules, soccer and rugby with the rules played being decided prior to the start of the match. However the Cambridge Rules were predominant in country in the Colony of Victoria from 1841 and Harrow football was the predominant code in Colony of South Australia from 1843.In Van Diemen's Land (Tasmania) rugby was being played at Christ College in Bishopsbourne in the late 1840s.

=== Rugby football and Australian rules football ===
In 1858, inspired by the popularity of the novel Tom Brown's School Days and its depiction of life at Rugby School, English public school football games began to be played in Melbourne and surrounding districts. The earliest known such match was played on 15 June 1858 between Scotch College and Melbourne Grammar School on the St Kilda foreshore. On 25 September 1858 the South Yarra FC and a team composed of members of the Melbourne Cricket Club (forerunner of the Melbourne FC) met in what many regard as the first club rugby game in Australia.

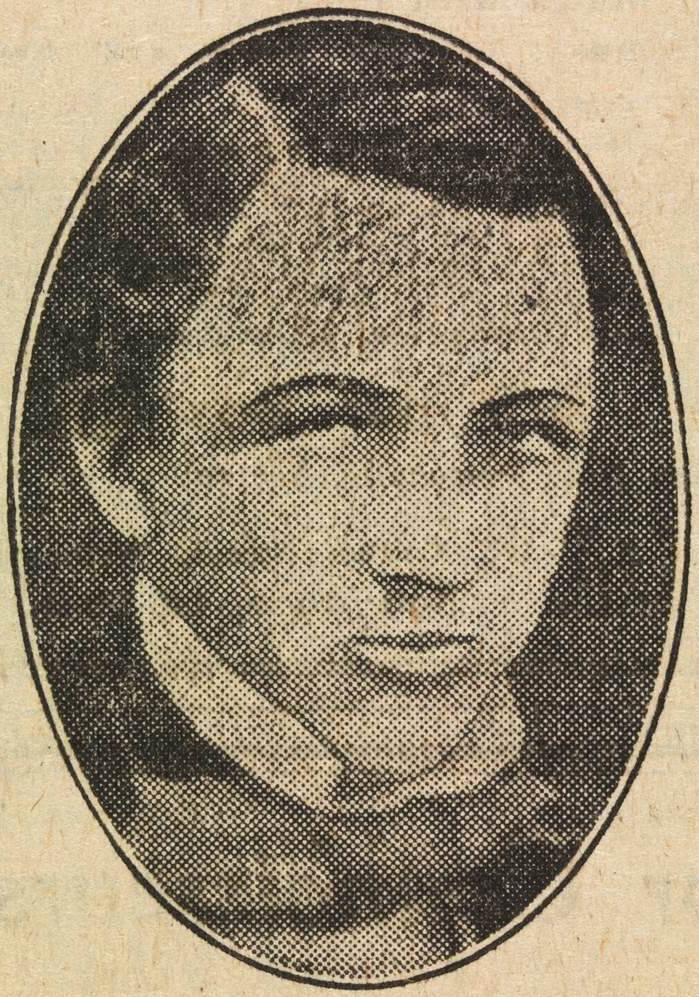
Daguerreotype of Tom Wills, taken during his time at Rugby School

Reacting to concerns about the dangers and complexity of the rugby game and its rules, Australian rules football was (as the Melbourne FC rules) devised at meeting on 17 May 1859. One of the co-founders of the game was Tom Wills. At the age of 14, Wills was sent to England to attend Rugby School, where he became captain of Rugby's cricket team and a star at the football game.

Even Wills, who favoured many rules of Rugby School football, saw the need for compromise for Victoria. He wrote to his brother Horace: "Rugby was not a game for us, we wanted a winter pastime but men could be harmed if thrown on the ground so we thought differently."

=== Rugby football in Australia and popularity ===
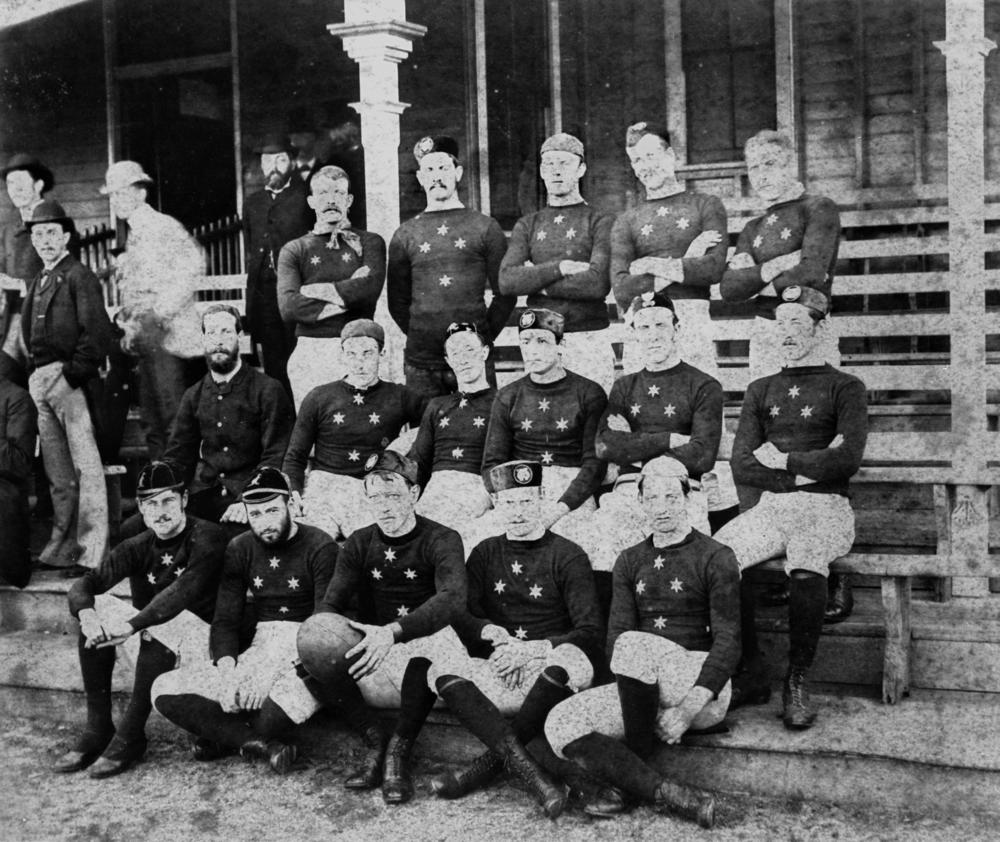
The New South Wales team, 1883

The first football clubs established in Sydney in 1865-69 had adopted from Melbourne the Australian rules game. While the Sydney University FC cites it was founded in 1863 and the birthplace of rugby in Australia, there is no clear evidence of what its playing rules in the 1860s were. By 1869, interest in football in Sydney football had declined to only two games were recorded. Both were played under improvised, mixed rules between teams of the University and the crew of the visiting British naval ship, HMS Rosario.

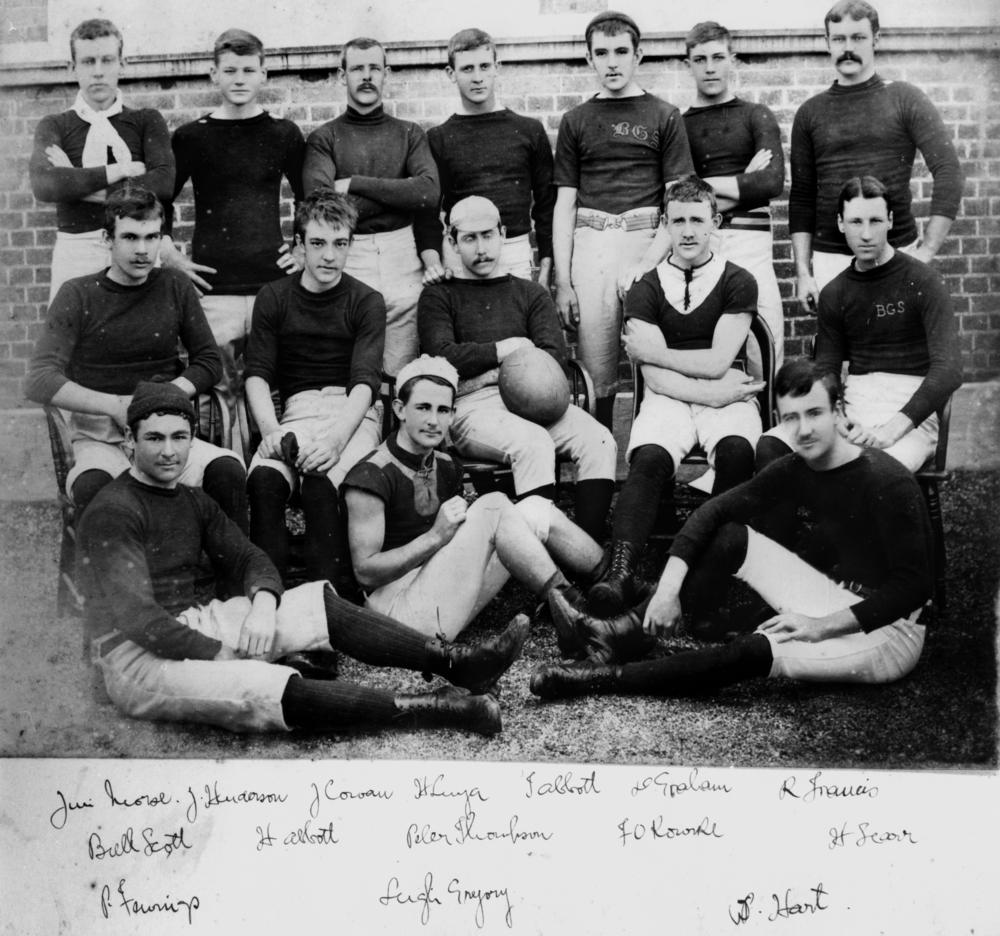
Brisbane Grammar School's first Rugby Union team, 1887.

This left the city as an open field when Sydney's first formally established rugby club the Wallaroo FC was founded in 1870 by former Rugby School students. The club declared it would not play any other football code. In what is now Australia's first confirmed game under rugby rules, Wallaroo played against British 'Army & Navy' team on 18 June 1870 at the Sydney Cricket Ground. The club's first rules famously included at Rule XXIII a provision which prohibited the "throttling or strangling" of opponents. The club's only other opponents in rugby games in 1870 were a team from the University. On 23 June 1871 a meeting was held at the Metropolitan Hotel to formally establish the Sydney University FC who today are Australia's oldest rugby union club.

In 1874 the Wallaroos led the formation of the Southern Rugby Football Union (now the NSWRU) ensuring its unaltered adoption of England's rugby union rules and a by-law that members (clubs and schools) could not play against non-members. This effectively discouraged any new club forming under a rival code as it would have no one to play. The other clubs with Wallaroo at the founding meeting were Goulburn, Waratah FC, Balmain, St. Leonards, The King’s School, Camden College and Newington College. In the oldest remaining rivalry game in Australian rugby union, The King's School and Newington still play each other annually via the AAGPS (NSW) Rugby competition. Growth in new clubs continued at a pace from the mid-1870s onwards, in both Sydney and regional centres alike.

The first inter-colonial (now inter-state) football match in Australia under any code occurred on 23 June 1877 when the Waratah FC met Victoria's Carlton FC in a rugby game held at the Albert Cricket Ground in Sydney. The clubs met again two days later under Victorian rules. The following season Waratah and Carlton played two further games in Melbourne under each other's code.

Rugby was first played in Queensland in Brisbane in 1876, however by the late 1870s the only code was Australian rules. In the early 1880s agitation saw the Queensland Football Association (QFA / Australian rules) allow its member clubs to play occasional games in Brisbane under rugby rules. The first of what immediately became annual inter-colonial rugby games occurred in Sydney in 1882 after the Southern Rugby Football Union (SRFU / now NSWRU) enticed a party of rugby-aligned players from the Queensland clubs to make a visit. New South Wales (now Waratahs) defeated Queensland (now Reds) by 28 points to 4 at the Sydney Cricket Ground (SCG) in front of 4,000 spectators.

The visit was reciprocated in 1883, boosting support for rugby union in Brisbane and Ipswich. The tour also saw the first use of a whistle by a referee in a rugby union game anywhere in the world, when W. 'Monty' Arnold (Wallaroo FC and NSWRU official) oversaw the NSW versus Queensland match at Eagle Farm Racecourse. The success of the tour culminated in the formation of the Northern Rugby Football Union (NRFU / now the QRU) at a meeting held on 2 November 1883 at the Exchange Hotel in Brisbane. The NRFU formed two in-house teams (Wanderers and Fireflies) and were soon joined by new clubs (including Wasps FC) and converts from the QFA (such as Brisbane's Wallaroo FC).

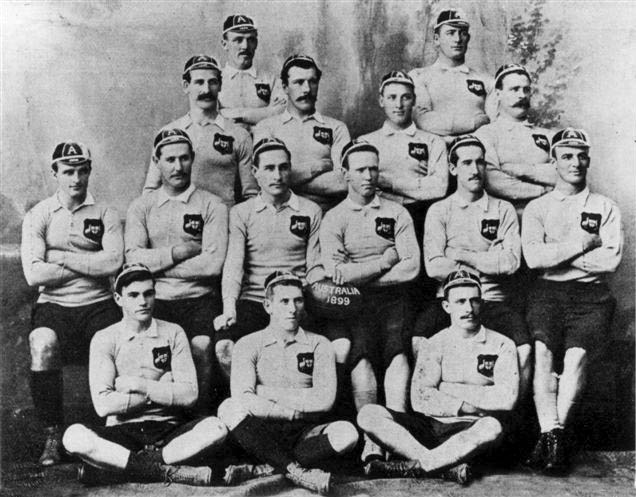
The Australia national team in 1899.

As a result of the formation of the NRFU, several prominent GPS schools took up rugby as opposed to Melbourne Rules.

Meanwhile in 1882 the first rugby clubs in Western Australia were founded in Perth and Fremantle. At the end of the 1882 season the SRFU undertook its inaugural NSW team tour of New Zealand, and in 1884 a New Zealand team travelled to NSW for matches in Sydney, Bathurst and Newcastle, commencing a regular exchange of tours between the colonies.

In 1888 the first British and Irish Lions tour took place, and although unsanctioned by official bodies in Europe, the 21-man squad travelled to both Australia and New Zealand. The 1888 and 1889 seasons visits to Australia from the New Zealand Native team. These international visits gave rise to the founding of the first Melbourne RFC formed in Victoria in 1888. In 1892, the rugby bodies in Australia dropped Southern and Northern from their titles, adopting New South Wales and Queensland respectively.

In 1893, Frank Ivory was the first Indigenous Australian to play representative rugby union (for Queensland).

In and around 1900 club rugby union in the major cities and towns across New South Wales and Queensland, including Sydney, Brisbane and Newcastle, introduced district clubs football with geographic residential qualification rules, and in the process caused the disbanding of the established clubs. In Sydney the resultant club competition in 1900 included present day Shute Shield clubs Northern Suburbs (North Sydney), Eastern Suburbs and West Harbour (Western Suburbs).

While many clubs claim to have been founded in the last quarter of the 1800s, almost all do not have a continuous unbroken existence, primarily due to the impact of the dominance of rugby league between the 1910s and 1950s. Northern Suburbs and Eastern Suburbs have played every season since 1920, making them the oldest continuously present rugby union clubs in Australia outside of the schools and universities.

The earliest formed rugby union club outside of the schools and universities that is still playing are the Maryborough Wallaroos who were founded in 1893 and then in 1910 swapped codes to rugby league. The earliest (oldest) rugby-playing provenance, including schools and universities, is held by the University of Tasmania's Christ College ('known as the Black Pigs') dating back to the students first playing in 1847.

== Birth of the Wallabies ==
The Australia's national rugby union team (now Wallabies), played its debut test match at the Sydney Cricket Ground in 1899, versus a touring British Lions side. The first Australian team captain was Frank Row of the Wallaroo FC. In 1903, Australia played its first test against the New Zealand All Blacks, in front of a crowd of 30,000 at the Sydney Cricket Ground. In 1907, Australia again played the All Blacks, at the same venue.

The team's first international tour to the Northern hemisphere was organised for 1908-09, when a squad of players travelled for nine months through England, Wales, France and North America. At a pre-tour function in Sydney it was announced the team would be called "the Rabbits", which British newspapers soon picked up on. The side played two matches on the way to England, but after arrival decided to hold a team meeting to choose an alternative name, with the "Wallabies" ultimately voted upon to replace "Rabbits". Invited to play in the rugby union tournament that was a part of the 1908 Summer Olympics in London, Australia won the gold medal, defeating the English team (Cornwall).

Throughout the 1908-09 tour the team performed a war cry that was claimed at the time to have Aboriginal Australians origins.Subsequent tours by Australian teams briefly continued this tradition until it was last seen in 1913.

At first "Wallabies" only pertained to the 1908-09 squad, until the 1930s when it came into official and popular for all overseas tours by the national team. The fashion to call all Australian teams the "Wallabies", whether home or away, came in the wake of the success of the 1984 Grand Slam Wallabies tour.

=== Arrival of rugby league ===
By the time England's new "Northern Union game" arrived in Australia it was fundamentally different from rugby union, with lineouts, rucks and two players from each team having already been removed, and the play-the-ball introduced.

In 1907, the schism that more than a decade earlier, had torn the Northern Rugby Football Union from the Rugby Football Union, arrived on Australia's doorstep. Rugby union's amateur high ideals, irked the working class rugby players who sought compensation for time away from work, especially after games in 1907 at the Sydney Cricket Ground drew high levels of gate-money for the NSWRU from crowds of up to 52,000. Assisted by professional cricketer Victor Trumper, a meeting took place at Bateman's Crystal Hotel in Sydney on 8 August 1907, where a resolution was made to form the New South Wales Rugby Football League. They played their first season in 1908.

Such was the impact of the arrival of rugby league, that in 1908, when the touring Wallabies team returned from England, the majority of the players joined rugby league teams.. By 1910 rugby league had overtaken rugby union in popularity.

=== Recovery ===
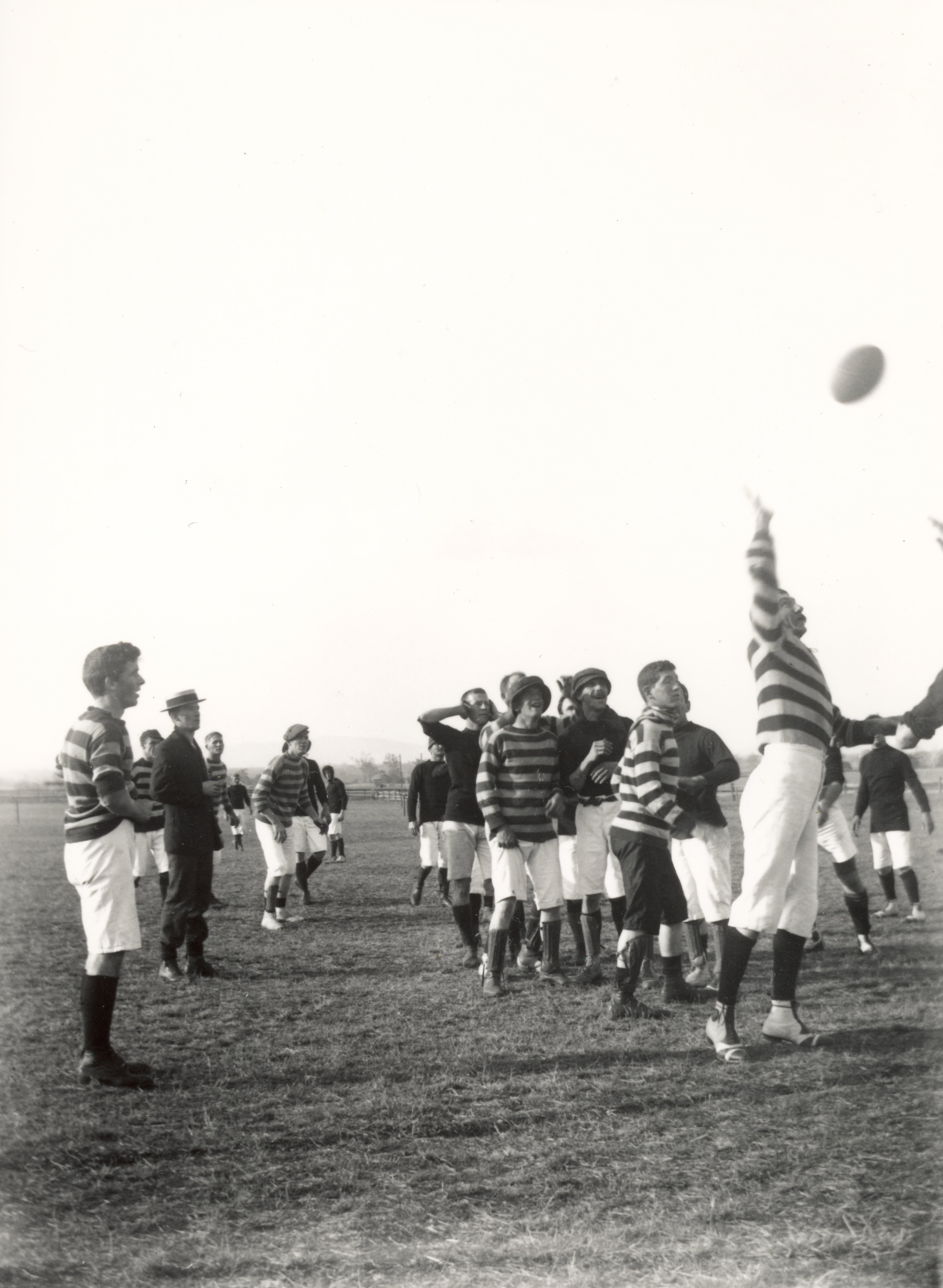
A rugby game in Queensland during the early 1900s.

Crowd numbers enjoyed at the beginning of the century would not be surpassed again by rugby union at the Sydney Cricket Ground after the start of rugby league in 1908. The SFS commenced as the Sydney rectangular venue for rugby league and union in 1988.

By the time of the 1910 British Lions rugby league tour, rugby league was well entrenched as the major winter sport in all of Queensland, New South Wales and the Australian Capital Territory, surpassing rugby union. This was a position from which rugby union would never recover in Australia.

=== Impact of World War I ===
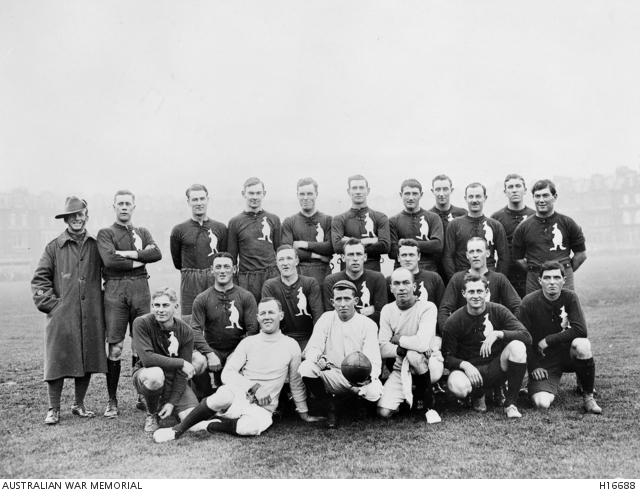
Australian Training Units team, formed by soldiers. That team played a charity game of Australian Rules football — known as the "Pioneer Exhibition Game" — held at Queen's Club in South Kensington on 28 October 1916 to raise money for British and French Red Cross.

Heavy enlistments took their toll on the playing population of Rugby Union in Australia during World War I. The Queensland Rugby Union dissolved, and was only able to reorganise again in 1928. Such was the drop in playing numbers that the only players available during the 1920s for representing Australia were the Waratah players.

An event that was to greatly shape rugby union's future in Australia was the onset of World War I in 1914. While rugby league, which had been introduced to Australia in 1908, continued to play in the form of NSWRL competitions, rugby union competitions were suspended due to an overwhelmingly high percentage of rugby union players enlisting to serve in the Australian Imperial Force.

The NSWRU also established the Rugby Union Rifle Club in Sydney in 1915, an organisation to assist in the training of the rugby men (current and retired) in military skills and physical fitness, to aid and encourage enlistment and local protection roles. This involved each of the first grade rugby clubs forming their own rifle club arm, including Eastern Suburbs Rugby Union Rifle Club, Northern Suburbs and Sydney University. The rugby men trained in marksmanship, drill and bayonet work, often combined with inter-club competitions, as well as rugby matches. Similar clubs were formed in the major centres of NSW and Queensland that had rugby union clubs. Such was its success, the movement fell away as most participants had enlisted. A Sydney newspaper reported: "According to figures prepared by Mr W. W. Hill, secretary of the NSWRU, 197 out of 220 regular first grade players are on active service, or 90 percent."

Weakened by the loss of its players to the war effort, the Queensland Rugby Union was dissolved in 1919. In the aftermath of the war, a large number of national representatives would defect to rugby league, giving rugby league a strong position in the states of New South Wales and Queensland, which it continues to maintain to this day.

=== Post World War I ===
In 1928 the QRU reformed, and the GPS and major clubs returned to rugby union. By the establishment of rugby clubs the code also gained permanent footing in the capital cities of Tasmania, South Australia and Western Australia. In 1931, the governor of New Zealand donated a sporting trophy called the Bledisloe Cup, named appropriately after Charles Bathurst, 1st Viscount Bledisloe, for competition between Australia and New Zealand. The first game was held that year at Eden Park, though the official start of the competition is disputed between that game and the 1932 New Zealand tour to Australia.

During the 1930s, the playing of sport on Sunday was banned in most of the country outside South Australia. During the 1930s, rugby league, which had gone professional, began to overtake rugby union in popularity in Queensland, with the league being the dominant spectator code by 1937.

The late 1940s saw the construction of a national governing body, as opposed to the NSWRU being the main organisation. In 1949, the Australian Rugby Union joined the world governing body, then known as the International Rugby Football Board (IRFB). Since 2017, the national governing body has been known as Rugby Australia.

=== 1980s and 1990s ===
In 1987, the first ever Rugby World Cup was held in both Australia and New Zealand, as a result of both the respective rugby bodies putting forth the idea to the IRFB. Australia was defeated by France in the semifinal stage.

In 1995, rugby union became openly professional in Australia following an agreement between SANZAR countries and Rupert Murdoch regarding pay television rights for the game. Australia won two world cups in the 90s, the 1991 Rugby World Cup defeating England in the final, and the 1999 Rugby World Cup defeating France in the final.

With rugby union becoming an openly professional sport in 1995, after more than a century of being a professed amateur code, major changes were seen in both the club and international game. The Super 12 rugby competition was born that year. The tournament involved 12 provincial sides from three counties; New Zealand, South Africa and Australia. Australia entered three sides into the competition; ACT Brumbies, Queensland Reds and the New South Wales Waratahs. The year also saw the Tri Nations Series, between the three Super 12 countries.

In 1999, the Bledisloe Cup match between Australia and the New Zealand All Blacks was staged at the Homebush Olympic Stadium, now known as ANZ Stadium. The game attracted a then world record crowd of 107,042 for a rugby union match. In 2000 this was bettered when a crowd of 109,874 witnessed the 'Greatest ever Rugby Match' when a Jonah Lomu try sealed a 39–35 All Blacks win over the Wallabies. The All Blacks had led 24-nil after 11 minutes only to see Australia draw level at 24 all by half time.

The Wallabies were champions of the 1999 Rugby World Cup in Wales, claiming their second Webb Ellis Cup trophy. In doing this, Australia became the first multiple winners of the tournament.

== The new millennium ==
The year 2003 saw the staging of the Rugby World Cup in Australia. Prior to the tournament, three high-profile Kangaroo rugby league players switched codes; Wendell Sailor, Mat Rogers and Lote Tuqiri. The fifth Rugby World Cup was held in various Australian cities from October to November in 2003. Matches were played all across the country, in Sydney, Brisbane, Melbourne, Canberra, Adelaide, Perth, Townsville, Gosford, Wollongong and Launceston. The tournament was hailed as a huge success, an estimated 40,000 international spectators travelled to Australia for the event, some estimations said that a $100 million may have been injected into the Australian economy. The Australian Rugby Union said that revenues exceeded all expectations, the tournament surplus was estimated to be at $44.5 million. The hosting of the World Cup in Australia also saw an increase in Super 12 crowds and junior participation. In 2005, to celebrate a decade of professional rugby union in Australia, the Wallaby Team of the Decade was announced.

In 2007, the ARU launched a national competition, the Australian Rugby Championship, with eight teams—three from New South Wales, two from Queensland, and one each from the ACT, Victoria and Western Australia. The ARC was scrapped after only one season due to higher-than-expected losses of $4.7 million.

In late 2013, the ARU announced plans to launch a new national competition to be known as the National Rugby Championship. Originally scheduled to launch in September 2014, after the Super Rugby season and much of The Rugby Championship, the competition was expected to involve 10 teams. Player payments were expected to be considerably lower than in the former ARC, and the NRC has a broadcast contract with Fox Sports. The ARU officially unveiled the NRC in March 2014 for an August launch with nine teams; the geographic distribution was identical to that of the former ARC, with the exception of a fourth NSW team. Since then, the competition has lost one domestic team but added the Fijian Drua, a developmental side for that country's national team.

In 2017, the Australian Rugby Union was renamed Rugby Australia, coinciding with relocating to their new premises in Moore Park, Sydney.

== Founding of a national union ==
Before 1947, all administration of Australian international rugby events was performed by the New South Wales Rugby Union. State unions in 1947 determined that Australia should be served by a national union in these matters. In 1948, World Rugby, then known as the International Rugby Football Board, extended the invitation to Australia and not the New South Wales Rugby Union, to take a seat on its board. This precipitated into the formation of the Australian Rugby Football Union (ARFU). Eleven delegates from the unions in New South Wales, Queensland, South Australia, Western Australia, Tasmania and Victoria met on 25 November 1949 for ARFU's inaugural meeting.

== Co-hosting the first Rugby World Cup ==
The idea of a world cup tournament for rugby had arisen several times. Possibly as early as the 1950s murmurings of a world cup tournament were made by Harold Tolhurst. In 1979 Australian Rugby Union's president Bill McLaughlin was requesting that Australia host a Rugby World Cup in conjunction with its Bicentennial celebrations in 1988. The IRFB had turned down all of these requests, forbidding any member unions from planning or attending any such events. Two separate objections have been noted, the first that the IRFB felt that the underlying amateur principle of rugby would be effected, the second that they did not want a rugby tournament being run by commercial interests.

These objections were laid aside in 1984, after receiving separate requests from New Zealand and Australia, to host a world cup, the IRFB decided to approve a feasibility study of a Rugby World Cup. Joining forces, New Zealand and Australia began their study on 1 December 1984. Presenting their findings to the IRFB at the Paris meeting in March 1985, the approval for a joint Rugby World Cup was hard-won. With an IRFB split evenly, it took a detractor John Kendall-Carpenter to change his vote to the affirmative, to allow the World Cup to take place.

The Rugby World Cup was held between 22 May to 20 June 1987.

== See also ==
- Origins of Australian rules football
- History of rugby league
- Rugby league in Australia
- Super Rugby
