= 1886 Southern Rugby Union season =

1886 Sydney Rugby Premiership
- Duration: May to September
- Teams: 16
- Premiers: Gordon (1st title)
- Runners-up: Sydney University
- Wooden spoon: Goulburn (1st spoon)
- Top point-scorer: John Wood (53)
- Top try-scorer: John Wood (7)

MacGregor Cup
- Number of teams: 15
- Premiers: Oxford
- Runners-up: Randwick

The 1886 Southern Rugby Football Union season was the 13th season of the Sydney Rugby Premiership. This was the fourth competition for the Gardiner Challenge Cup which was awarded to the winners of the premiership. The football season was from May till September 1886. The season culminated in the premiership, which was won by Gordon who were newly formed at the beginning of the year. Gordon were crowned premiers by a committee of the Union.

== Teams ==
For the 1886 season, the Union decided to elevate 5 Junior clubs into the senior competition. Albion, Balmain Wellington, Glebe, Parramatta and Rosedale had performed well during the previous season. In addition, they also included 3 regional clubs from Newcastle, Bathurst and Goulburn. These clubs had successfully competed against metropolitan clubs prior to their admission. A new club, exclusively for New Zealand players, was formed and successfully petitioned to be included in the senior competition. This club took on the name Gordon. Many of their players had competed previously for other clubs. After poor performance during the previous season, the St. Leonards club was not reformed and thus did not participate in the Gardiner Challenge Cup.

Club	Colors	Formed	Ground	Captain
Albion		c.1885	Rushcutters Bay Oval	George Foster
Arforma		prior to 1883	None	EC Ebsworth
Balmain		c.1873	None	C Hawkins
Balmain Wellington		c.1884	None	Armit
Bathurst		prior to 1883	Railway Oval, Bathurst	Yeomans
Burwood		prior to 1883	Burwood Park	Samuel Chapman
Glebe		prior to 1883	Wentworth Park	Bourke
Gordon		26 February 1886	None	James O'Donnell
Goulburn		22 July 1872	Eastgrove Park, Goulburn	Unknown
Newcastle		prior to 1883	Newcastle Cricket Ground	AB Ford
Newtown		prior to 1883	MacDonaldtown Park	P Allen
Parramatta		c.1879	None	W Coates
Redfern		24 May 1878	None	James Cleeve
Rosedale		c.1884	None	James McMahon
Sydney University		c.1863	University Oval	James MacManamey
Wallaroo		19 May 1871	None	George Graham

== Rule Changes ==
With the addition of regional clubs and the promotion of junior clubs, the Sydney Rugby Premiership saw sixteen teams compete for the Gardiner Challenge Cup. This increase in teams competing for the cup caused many of the senior clubs to limit their games to only those which would count towards the final results. Previous competitions between junior and senior clubs were thus rare. Growing crowd numbers saw games moving from the open Moore Park to more enclosed fields. The Royal Agricultural Society of NSW arranged for three fields to be available upon their grounds, however the third area was of poor quality. The Association Cricket Ground was made available from July.

== Season summary ==
In their first season of football, the Gordon Football Club performed well against the more established senior clubs. In fifteen games, the club was only defeated once by the Balmain team. Amongst their victories during the season, Gordon had defeated Sydney University, Redfern, Burwood and Wallaroo FC who were amongst the best teams. Much of their success was attributed to their captain, James O'Donnell. At the conclusion of the season a committee of the union awarded Gordon the premiership with Sydney University recognised as coming second.

In 1885, Balmain Wellington had been the premier junior club. Now in the senior ranks, the club performed well displaying improvement as the season progressed. Many of their games were played on inferior grounds with the club not once playing on the Association Cricket Ground. the club had the benefit of all of their players remaining fit for the entire season. Their game against Gordon was a highlight of the year.

The new regional clubs that had been added to the premiership only played a handful of games. At a meeting of the Union in September, it was suggested that branch unions be formed in the Newcastle, Bathurst and Goulburn regions to deal with disputes.

== Ladder ==
=== 1886 Gardiner Challenge Cup ===
	Team	Pld	W	D	L	B	PF	PA	PD
1	Gordon	15	11	3	1	0	124	15	+109
2	Sydney University	13	11	0	2	0	182	26	+156
3	Arfoma	15	9	3	3	0	104	36	+68
4	Wallaroo	16	8	2	6	0	98	67	+31
5	Balmain Wellington	12	7	2	3	0	54	39	+15
6	Burwood	10	4	2	4	0	38	74	-36
7	Rosedale	10	4	1	5	0	28	43	-15
8	Balmain	11	3	5	3	0	39	29	+10
9	Redfern	11	3	1	7	0	29	124	-95
10	Newcastle	6	2	0	4	0	21	44	-23
11	Glebe	10	3	4	3	0	27	26	+1
12	Parramatta	5	1	1	3	0	23	27	-4
13	Newtown	11	2	2	7	0	7	85	-78
14	Albion	9	1	2	6	0	29	77	-48
15	Bathurst	2	0	1	1	0	2	13	-11
16	Goulburn	2	0	0	2	0	4	29	-25

- The ladder shown above was calculated using results of games published in newspapers of the period. Only games indicated as Gardiner Challenge Cup games or games between cup teams were included. Games against non-cup teams were not included. Ladders published in newspapers of the period included games against teams not included in the cup. Inconsistencies occur between the ladders published and the results recorded. This may be due to the Union altering results as a result of protests.

== Lower Grades ==
In 1886, a Sydney businessman donated a cup for the development of a Junior Rugby Football competition. The MacGregor Junior Challenge Cup was open to clubs not participating in the senior competition. Fifteen clubs submitted applications to enter the competition. The competition was due to begin 24 May and run each Saturday until 1 August. Each club was balloted with a game for each weekend. It was planned that the best 8 clubs would then be matched up with another ballot. The final for the MacGregor Cup occurred on 4 September between Oxford and Randwick. Oxford won the match 5 points to nil to win the cup.

Balmain Loretto	Cammeray	Cleveland	Double Bay	Harrowgate
Imperial	Manly	Oxford	Parramatta Union	Petersham
Randwick	Strathfield	Summer Hill	Sydney Grammar	Victoria House

== Representative Games ==
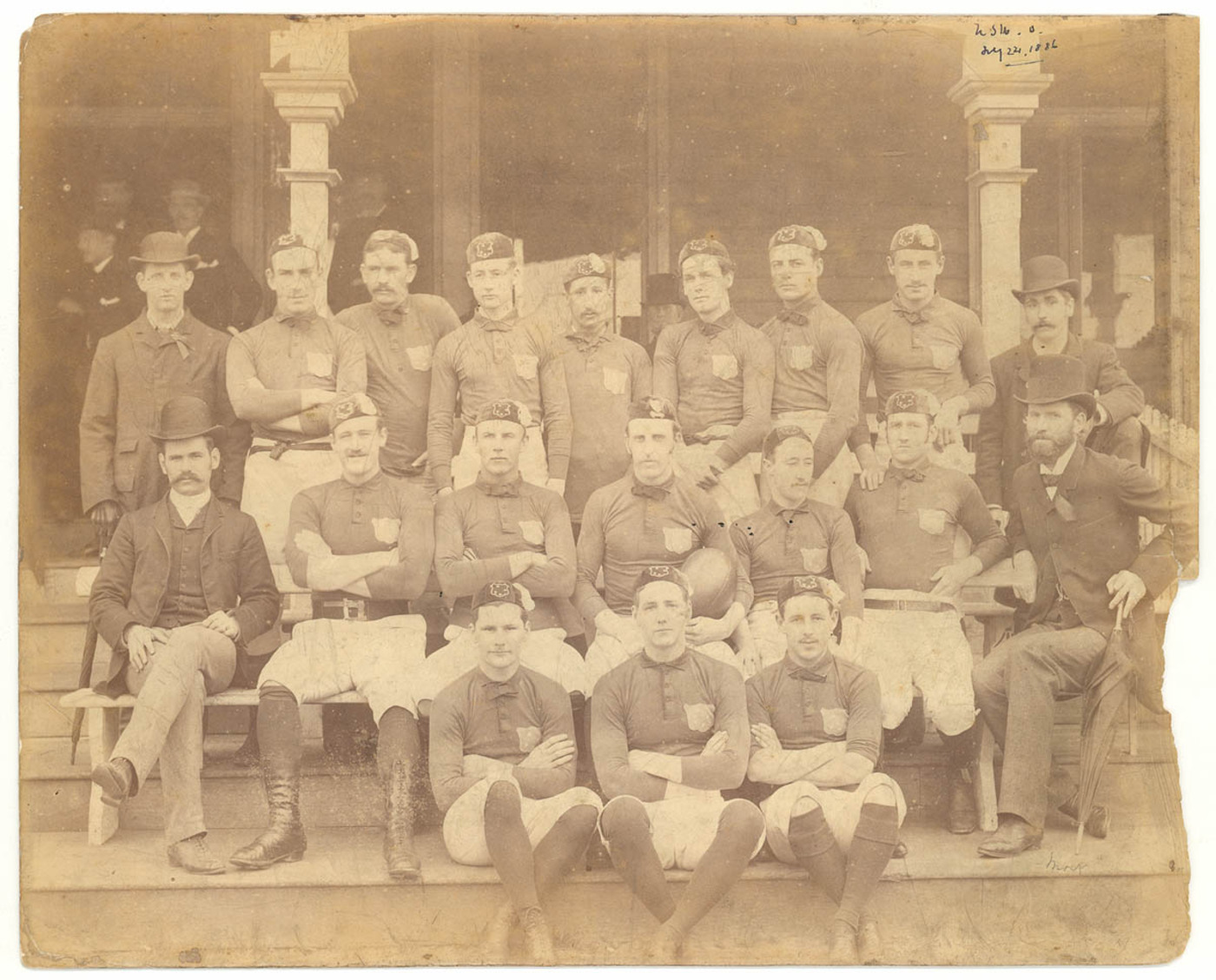
NSW Rugby Team at the Association Cricket Ground prior to their first match against Queensland.

=== Intercolonial Matches ===
In late July, the Gardiner Cup took a break in order to play two matches against a visiting Queensland team. When the visitors arrived in Sydney, it was obvious that they were far larger and heavier than the local players. The first match saw showers, making the ground and ball slippery. During the game, when the play was of a more tight nature, the Queenslanders were dominate. However once the play moved into being more open, the two teams were more equal. In the end an exciting game saw Queensland victors 4 points to 2. After making some changes for the second match, New South Wales were superior to the Queensland team winning the match 26 points to 5.

9th New South Wales - Queensland Intercolonial Football Match

24 July 1886

New South Wales	2 - 4	Queensland
Tries: GW McArthur; Goals: JR Wood (0/1)		Tries: AJ Hickson, A Stacey; Goals: P Roberts (0/2)

Association Cricket Ground
Attendance: 4000
Referee: RW Thallon

10th New South Wales - Queensland Intercolonial Football Match

31 July 1886

New South Wales	26 - 5	Queensland
Tries: EM Cameron (3), FA Baylis, GW McArthur, CL Tange, E Hungerford; Goals: EM Cameron (2/2), JA O'Donnell (1/4), FA Baylis (1/1); Drop goals: GW Walker (0/1)		Tries: T Manson; Goals: P Roberts (1/1)

Association Cricket Ground
Attendance: 5000
Referee: RW Thallon

=== The New South Wales Tour of New Zealand ===
In 1886 a team of New South Wales players were chosen and sent to New Zealand to play a number of matches against the local teams. The NSW team departed Sydney at the conclusion of the Gardiner Cup. No games were scheduled to play against a New Zealand team with games being against only local clubs. Unfortunately, the tourists did not fare well with a number of disappointing results. The merit of sending a team of young and inexperienced players was questioned and it was hoped that the results would not cause opposing teams to not value the New South Wales rugby players.

== Team & Player Records ==
=== Top 10 Point Scorers ===
Pts	Player	T	G	FG
53	John Wood	7	13	0
38	Byers	5	8	1
15	Harris	0	5	0
15	Wiseman	2	1	2
14	Fred Hillyar	5	0	1
14	George Walker	1	0	3
14	Robert Warren	7	0	0
14	George McArthur	7	0	0
13	Fred Weaver	3	1	1
12	E Hungerford	3	2	0

=== Top 10 Try Scorers ===
T	Player
7	John Wood
7	Robert Warren
7	George McArthur
5	Byers
5	Fred Hillyar
5	Joseph Doyle
5	Leo Neill
5	William Bennett
4	Francis Baylis
4	Jenkins

=== Most points in a match (Team) ===
Pts	Team	Opponent	Venue	Date
30	Sydney University	Redfern	Agricultural Society Ground	10 July
28	Gordon	Redfern	Agricultural Society Ground	3 July
22	Arfoma	Goulburn	Eastgrove	24 May
22	Wallaroo	Albion	Agricultural Society Ground	29 May
19	Sydney University	Wallaroo	Norwood Park	19 June
19	Sydney University	Newtown	Agricultural Society Ground	3 July
19	Glebe	Redfern	Redfern Ground	14 August

=== Greatest Winning Margin ===
Pts	Team	Score	Opponent	Venue	Date
30	Sydney University	30 - 0	Redfern	Agricultural Society Ground	10 July
28	Gordon	28 - 0	Redfern	Agricultural Society Ground	3 July
22	Arfoma	22 - 0	Goulburn	Eastgrove	24 May
22	Wallaroo	22 - 0	Albion	Agricultural Society Ground	29 May
19	Sydney University	19 - 0	Newtown	Agricultural Society Ground	3 July

== Participating Clubs ==
Club	Senior Grade		Junior Grade
Club	1st	2nd	Junior Grade
Albion Football Club	Y	Y	
Arfoma Football Club	Y	Y	
Balmain Rugby Football Club	Y	Y	
Balmain Harrowgate Football Club			Y
Balmain Loretto Football Club			Y
Balmain Wellington Football Club	Y		
Bathurst Football Club	Y	Y	
Burwood Football Club	Y	Y	
Cammeray Football Club			Y
Cleveland Football Club			Y
Double Bay Football Club			Y
Glebe Football Club	Y	Y	
Gordon Football Club	Y	Y	
Goulburn Football Club	Y		
Imperial Football Club			Y
Manly Football Club			Y
Newcastle Football Club	Y		
Newtown Football Club	Y	Y	
Oxford Football Club			Y
Parramatta Football Club	Y		
Parramatta Union Football Club			Y
Petersham Rugby Football Club			Y
Randwick Football Club			Y
Redfern Football Club	Y	Y	
Rosedale Football Club	Y		
Strathfield Football Club			Y
Summer Hill Football Club			Y
Sydney Grammar School			Y
Sydney University Football Club	Y	Y	
Victoria House Football Club			Y
Wallaroo Football Club	Y	Y	
