= Cornelian Bay, Tasmania =

Cornelian Bay
- Suburb
- Interactive map of Cornelian Bay
- Coordinates: 42°51′11″S 147°19′9″E
- Country: Australia
- State: Tasmania
- City: Hobart
- LGA: City of Hobart
- Postcode: 7008
Suburbs around Cornelian Bay
Moonah	Lutana	River Derwent
New Town	Cornelian Bay	River Derwent
New Town	Domain	River Derwent

Cornelian Bay is a small suburb in Hobart, Tasmania, Australia. It lies just north of the urban parkland, the Queens Domain. The bay itself is a safe anchorage for yacht owners.

== History ==
Tasmanian Aboriginal people of the Mouheneenner band lived by the River Derwent in the Cornelian Bay area for 8000 years – their shell middens can still be seen in the dark sands near the top of the low cliffs of Cornelian Point.

The first English navigator to explore the River Derwent was Lieutenant John Hayes – in 1793 he came ashore at this location and named the bay for the semi-precious cornelian stones found on the beach.

Soon after Sullivans Cove was settled in 1804, the Cornelian Bay site became the Government Farm, supplying fresh vegetables and other produce for the first residents of Hobart Town.

== Industries and business ==
A waterfront restaurant and boathouses line the foreshore.

An oil refinery and fuel storage depot with port facilities were built on reclaimed land at Self's Point in 1951, between New Town Bay and Cornelian Bay.

== Cornelian Bay Cemetery ==
Cornelian Bay Cemetery and Crematorium, dominates the surrounding hillside.

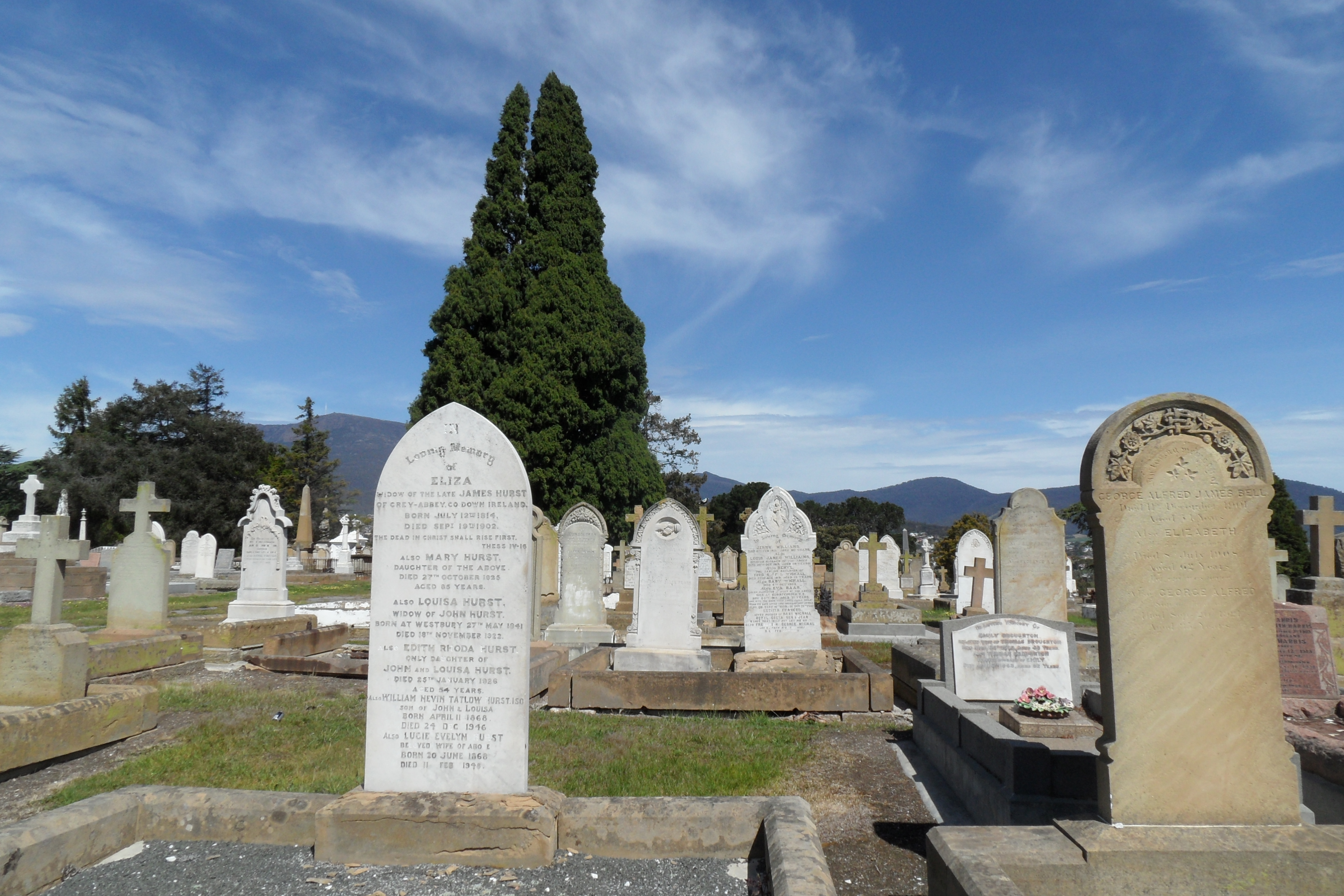
Cornelian Bay Cemetery with Mt Wellington in the background

The cemetery contains 124 Commonwealth war graves of service personnel, 49 from World War I and 75 from World War II; 40 of the graves are in a plot known as the Hobart War Cemetery, the remainder scattered throughout the cemetery. The Commonwealth War Graves Commission also erected a memorial to 18 Australian service personnel - 16 soldiers, one sailor and one airman - who were cremated at the Crematorium in the latter war, as well as the Tasmania Cremation Memorial, to four service personnel whose ashes were scattered elsewhere in Tasmania. John Vincent Holland, V.C., has his grave in the cemetery. William Nevin Tatlow Hurst, Secretary for Lands (1925–1938) is buried in Section W, in his family's grave number 224.

== Sporting facilities ==
Cornelian Bay is home to many sports fields and sports headquarters.

The Tasmanian Rugby Union oval at Rugby Park is the home ground for Hobart Harlequins Rugby Union Club, Hobart Lions Rugby Club and Taroona Rugby Club.

The headquarters of Hockey Tasmania is at the Tasmanian Hockey Centre, the location of all Hockey South roster matches. Hockey Tasmania has two teams in the Australian Hockey League, the men's Tasmanian Tigers and the women's Tasmanian Van Demons.

Sport and Recreation House, the headquarters of Basketball Tasmania is also located at the Rugby Park.

The Tasmanian University Boat Club and other rowing clubs are based at Newtown Bay.
