= Jason Spice =

New Zealand rugby union player

- Born: 7 December 1974 (age 51) Matamata, New Zealand
- Height: 1.80 m (5 ft 11 in)
- Weight: 85 kg (13 st 5 lb)
- School: Matamata College
- University: Waikato University

Rugby union career
- Position: Halfback/Scrum-half
Senior career
Years	Team	Apps	(Points)
1995–1998	Waikato		
1999–2000	Wellington		
2009–2010	Bristol		
2010	Launceston RUFC		
Provincial / State sides
Years	Team	Apps	(Points)
2004–2007	Ospreys	78	(62)
2007–2009	Cardiff Blues	46	(30)
Super Rugby
Years	Team	Apps	(Points)
1998–1999	Blues		
1999–2003	Hurricanes		
International career
Years	Team	Apps	(Points)
2001	New Zealand	0	

Jason Edward Spice (born 7 December 1974) is a New Zealand international rugby union player and first-class cricketer. His position of choice is as a scrum-half.

Spice was born in Matamata, NZ. He is a former New Zealand age-group cricketer who played for Hamilton in the Hawke Cup, then the Northern Districts Knights at first-class level, mainly as a left-arm spinner and lower-order batsman, before his position in the team was taken by Daniel Vettori.

Spice then turned his attention to rugby, which he had also starred at in secondary school. He made the Waikato NPC team and played six games for the Blues in 1998 before transferring to Wellington, where he played 61 games for the province and 66 for the Hurricanes Super Rugby franchise. Spice was a New Zealand A tourist to Europe in 2000. He was called up as a substitute for the All Blacks against Argentina in 2001 and was again on standby for the 2002 end of season tour.

After leaving the Hurricanes in 2004, he played three seasons and 77 games for the Ospreys in Wales, 48 games for Cardiff and a staggering 31 games in one season with Bristol. Spice joined Bristol RFC from the Cardiff Blues in May 2009. He was considered a good signing for Bristol Rugby because as well as playing his regular position of scrum half he could also cover at fly half, which became evident as the Ospreys struggled with injuries and international call-ups for that position. In June 2010, Spice bought out the remainder of his contract with Bristol Rugby after it was announced that Bristol was asking their players to take a 50% pay cut following their failure to regain promotion to the Aviva Premiership. He then picked up short-term contracts with Leicester, Launceston and Newcastle before returning home to New Zealand.
