= John Cleeve =

- Born: John Kingdon Cleeve; 14 February 1864 Woolloomooloo, New South Wales
- Died: 7 April 1952 (aged 88) Penrith, New South Wales
- School: Newington College
- Notable relative: James Cleeve

Rugby union career
- Position: Half–back
Provincial / State sides
Years	Team	Apps	(Points)
- NSW Waratahs
International career
Years	Team	Apps	(Points)
1884	Australia		

John Kingdon Cleeve (14 February 1864 – 7 April 1952) was an Australian rugby union player. The Australian Rugby Union’s records show him playing just one Test match for New South Wales, in 1884. He won representative caps for the colony against New Zealand in 1884 and Queensland in 1885. Playing as a halfback, he was described by the Sydney Morning Herald as ‘...a decided acquisition [for the 1884 match against New Zealand], as he is a resolute and hard-working player.’

Cleeve and his twin brother, James Cleeve (14 February 1864 – 7 February 1909) were born in Woolloomooloo, New South Wales to John Cleeve, Police magistrate of Penrith, New South Wales, and Frances "Fanny" (née Oatley). The Cleve boys attended Newington College in 1881 and 1882 whilst the cricketer Joseph Coates was Headmaster.
