= Bruce Bailey (rugby union) =

- Full name: Bruce Gilbert Bailey
- Born: 7 May 1940 Sydney, NSW, Australia
- Died: 12 January 1999 (aged 58)

Rugby union career
- Position: Prop
International career
Years	Team	Apps	(Points)
1963	Australia		

Bruce Gilbert Bailey (7 May 1940 – 12 January 1999) was an Australian international rugby union player.

A wool-classer from country New South Wales, Bailey was known by the nickname "Broody" and played as a prop.

Bailey was captain-coach of Goulburn in 1963 when he earned a Wallabies call up for their 1963 tour of South Africa and featured in eight fixtures during the tour, but none of the Tests against the Springboks. He later lived in Melbourne through his work, winning premierships as both a player and coach with Box Hill.

== See also ==
- List of Australia national rugby union players
