= South Eastern Tasmania Eightball Association =

Governing body for the South Eastern Tasmania in Australia for Eightball pool

South Eastern Tasmania Eightball Association is the governing body for the South Eastern Tasmania, Australia or the "Eastern Shore" of Hobart for the sport of Eightball pool, a cue sport and is affiliated with Eightball Tasmania.

== Members ==
=== Current ===
- Beltana Hotel, Lindsifarne
- Campania Tavern
- Dodges Ferry Cafe
- Eastern Suburbs RUFC, North Warrane
- Richmond Hotel
- Sorell RSL
- Hobart Workers Club
- Shoreline Hotel, Howrah

=== Former ===
- Campania Hotel - Hotel no longer exists through Fire
- Clarence Hotel, Bellerive
- Foreshore Tavern, Lauderdale
- Gordon Highlander, Sorell
- LewishamTavern
- Pines Resort, Seven Mile Beach
- Sun Valley Inn, Mornington
- Village Green Tavern, Rokeby
- Willows Tavern, Risdon - Hotel Demolished 2015
- Horse Shoe Inn, Cambridge
- Pembroke Hotel, Sorell
- Midway Point Tavern
- Derwent Tavern

== Notable Representative Title ==
=== World Titles ===
2015 World Junior Team World Champions - Australia - Alexander Pace(ESRUFC)

=== Runner Up ===
- 2010 World Junior Singles Final - Anthony Adams

=== Australian Team Representation ===
- 2015 Australian Team Captain - Jeremy McGuire(Midway Point Tavern)
- 2015 Australian Junior Team Vice Captain - Alexander Pace(ESRUFC)
- 2015 Australian Junior Team Representative - Alexander Pace(ESRUFC)
- 2010 Australian Junior Team Captain - Anthony Adams (Belatana)
- 2008 Australian Junior Team Representative - Anthony Adams (Beltana)
- 2009 Australian Junior Team Representative - Anthony Adams (Belatana)
- 2010 Australian Junior Team Representative - Anthony Adams (Belatana), Chris Forsyth (Foreshore)

=== Australian Titles ===
- 2017 Australian Masters Champion - Greg Lawry (Midway Point Tavern)
- 2011 Australian Junior Team Champions - Tasmania - Manager Cyrill Triffett (Beltana)
- 2010 Australian Under 18 Singles Champion - Anthony Adams(Beltana/Tasmania)
- Australian Junior Team Champions - Tasmania - Manager Cyrill Triffett(Beltana), Anthony Adams(Beltana), Alexander Pace(ESRUFC)

=== Tasmanian Titles ===
==== Singles Title ====
- 2015 Tasmanian State Singles Title - Jeremy McGuire(Midway Point Tavern)
- 2015 R/U Tasmanian State Singles Title - Alexander Pace(ESRUFC)
- 2013 Tasmanian State Singles Title - Anthony Adams (Beltana)
- 2011 Tasmanian State Singles Title - Anthony Adams (Beltana)
- 1999 Tasmanian State Singles Title - Jeremy McGuire
- 1994 Tasmanian State Singles Title - Justin Van Diepen
- 1991 Tasmanian State Singles Title -Geoff Youd

==== Masters Singles Title ====
- 2008 Tasmanian State Masters Singles Title -Geoff Youd

==== Open Doubles Title ====
- 2012 Tasmanian State Open Doubles Title - Dallas Nichols / Justin Van Diepen
- 2003 Tasmanian State Open Doubles Title - Dallas Nichols / Justin Van Diepen
- 2002 Tasmanian State Open Doubles Title - Dallas Nichols / Justin Van Diepen

=== State Teams Event ===
- 2013 Beltana GTR's
- 2011 Foreshore Tavern Breakers
- 2002 Shoreline Hotel
- 1994 Foreshore Tavern Black
- 1992 Foreshore Tavern Black

=== State Teams Event - B Grade ===
- 2024 Dodges Ferry Ladz
- 2023 ESRUFC Pacey Hookers

== Bill Johnston Memorial Shield A Grade Premiers ==
Year	Premiers	Runner up
2017	Midway Point Tavern	Beltana Hotel Dragons
2016	Shoreline Hotel Red	Beltana Hotel Dragons
2015		
2014	Shoreline Hotel Red	Rugby Club Breakers
2013	Beltana Hotel GTR's	Rugby Club Breakers
2012	Beltana Hotel GTR's	Shoreline Showbags
2011	East's Rugby Club Breakers	Sorell RSL Club
2010	Foreshore Breakers	Beltana Hotel Saints
2009	Shoreline Ducks	Beltana Hotel Saints
2008	Shoreline Ducks	
2007	Willow's Hurricane's	
2006	Shoreline Ducks	
2005	Beltana Hotel	
2004	Shoreline Hotel	
2003	Willow's Hurricane's	
2002	Willow's Hurricane's	
2001	Shoreline Hotel	
2000	Willow's Hurricane's	Clarence Blue
1999	Clarence Blue	
1998	Clarence Blue	
1997	Clarence Blue	
1996	Clarence Blue	
1995	Clarence Blue	
1994	Foreshore Black	Clarence Blue
1993		Clarence Blue
1992	Foreshore Black	Clarence Blue
1991		Shoreline Hotel
1990		Clarence Blue
1989	Clarence Blue	Shoreline Hotel
1988	Clarence DFC (Red)	Clarence Blue
1987	Clarence Blue	
1986	Clarence Blue	
1985		Shoreline Hotel
1984		Shoreline Hotel
1983		Shoreline Hotel
1982	Shoreline Hotel 1	
1981	Shoreline Hotel 1	
1980	Shoreline Hotel 1	
1979	Foreshore Tavern 1	
1978	Shoreline Hotel 1	
1977	Foreshore Tavern	
1976-77		Shoreline Hotel 1
1975-76		Shoreline Hotel 1
1975	Sun Valley Inn	

== Ernie Doring Memorial Shield B Grade Premiers ==
Year	Premiers	Runner up
2023	Rugby Bears	Dodges Ferry Ladz
2022		
2021		
2020		
2019		
2018		
2017	Richmond Convicts	Shoreline Hotel Blue
2016	Richmond Convicts	
2015	Richmond Convicts	
2014	Richmond Convicts	Shoreline Hotel White
2013	Shoreline Hotel White	Willow's Sharks
2012	Shoreline Hotel White	Richmond Convicts
2011	Shoreline Hotel White	Willow's Sharks
2010	Foreshore Villain's	Sorell RSL Crispa's
2009	Village Green Sharks	Pembroke Hotel
2008	East's Rugby Club White	Village Green Rebels
2007	East's Rugby Club White	
2006		
2005	Pembroke Hotel	Willow's Tavern Puma's
2004	Sorell RSL Club	Campania Tavern
2003	Village Green Bears	
2002	Richmond Convicts	Campania "A"
2001	Shoreline Hotel	Village Green Bears
2000	Midway Tavern	
1999	Beltana Hotel	Shoreline White
1998	Rokeby Gold	Foreshore Panthers
1997	Willows Tavern	Clarence Cougars
1996	Rokeby Rebels	Campania Tavern
1995	Willows Tavern	Lewisham Dolphins
1994	Foreshore Raiders	Lewisham Gold
1993	Rokeby Gold	Shoreline White
1992	Gordon Highlander	Campania Tavern
1991	Midway Tavern	Horseshoe Inn
1990	Lewisham Blue	Rokeby Gold
1989	Clarence Hotel	Campania Tavern
1988	Lewisham Blue	Foreshore Tavern
1987	Clarence DFC (Red)	Rokeby Gold
1986	Foreshore Black	Clarence DFC (Red)
1985	Clarence DFC (Red)	Midway Tavern
1984	Clarence DFC (Red)	
1983		
1982		
1981		
1980		
1979	Rokeby Tavern Green	
1978	Rokeby Tavern Green	
1977	Rokeby Tavern Green	
1976		

== Venue External links ==
- http://www.beltanahotel.com.au/ Beltana Hotel
- https://web.archive.org/web/20160107080524/http://easts.rugbynet.com.au/ Eastern Suburbs Rugby Union Football Club
- http://midwaypointtavern.com.au/ Midway Point Tavern
- http://www.pembrokehotel.com.au/ Pembroke Hotel
- http://www.richmondarmshotel.com.au/ Richmond Arms Hotel
- http://www.shorelinehotel.com.au/ Shoreline Hotel
