= Eastern Suburbs RUFC (Tasmania) =

Australian rugby union club, based in Warrane, Tasmania

(Australia) Eastern Suburbs
- Nickname: The Roosters or Easts
- Founded: 1964; 62 years ago
- Location: Warrane, Tasmania, Australia
- Ground: North Warrane Oval
- League: Tasmanian Rugby Union
1st kit	2nd kit

Official website
- eastsrugby.club

Eastern Suburbs Rugby Union Football Club is a rugby union club in Tasmania. Established in 1964, the club is a member of the Tasmanian Rugby Union and Tasmanian Rugby Union Juniors, affiliated with the Australian Rugby Union and plays in the Tasmanian Rugby Union Statewide League. The club has two eightball teams that represent the club in the South Eastern Tasmanian Eightball Association.

The club's home ground is at North Warrane Oval in the City of Clarence. Known as the Roosters or Easts, the club colours are maroon and white. The club currently fields senior men's and women's teams, as well as juniors.

== Premierships ==
=== Senior team ===
Player uniform logo

- Premiers First Grade 1981
- Premiers Second Grade 2019
- R/U First Grade 2016
- Statewide Premiers First Grade 1987
- Minor Premiers First Grade 1987
- Premiers Reserve Grade 1968, 1973, 1974, 1994, 2002
- Minor Premiers Reserve Grade 1999
- Finalist First Grade 2014

=== Juniors ===
- Under 20: 1979
- Under 18: 1983
- Under 16: 2009
- Under 14: 2007, 2008

== Eightball ==
Eastern Suburbs Rugby Union Football Club Inc. fields two teams in the South Eastern Tasmania Eightball Association which is affiliated with Eightball Tasmania, Australian Eight Ball Federation and the World Eightball Pool Federation.

Eastern Suburbs Rugby Union Football Club Inc. fields a team the Warrane Warriors in the Hobart Eightball Association.

=== Premierships ===
==== State ====
2023 State B Grade Teams Event ESRUFC Pacey Hookers
