= John Klem =

- Full name: John Robert Klem
- Born: 12 February 1943 (age 83) Sydney, NSW, Australia
- Height: 164 cm (5 ft 5 in)
- Weight: 66 kg (146 lb)

Rugby union career
- Position: Scrum–half
Provincial / State sides
Years	Team	Apps	(Points)
- New South Wales
International career
Years	Team	Apps	(Points)
1963	Australia		

John Robert Klem (born 12 February 1943) was an Australian international rugby union player.

Born in Sydney, Klem was of South African descent through his father David, a native of Vereeniging. He attended Balgowlah High School and Hawkesbury Agricultural College.

Klem, a pocked sized scrum–half, was a surprise selection by the Wallabies, having been restricted to Sydney's second division in matches with his college XV. He gained his call up in 1963, to be a reserve five-eighth on their tour of South Africa, behind Phil Hawthorne. After debuting in a fixture against North Eastern Districts, Klem scored a try in his next match, partnering with Ken Catchpole for a win over Rhodesia. The selectors stuck with Hawthorne through the Test series and he finished the tour with nine uncapped appearances.

== See also ==
- List of Australia national rugby union players
