= Tasmanian Rugby Union =

TRU
- Sport: Rugby union
- Founded: 1934
- RA affiliation: 1949 (founding member)
- Website: www.tasrugby.com.au

The Tasmanian Rugby Union, or TRU, is the governing body for the sport of rugby union within the state of Tasmania in Australia. The Tasmanian Rugby Union was first formed in 1934 and incorporated in 1975. It is a member of Rugby Australia.

Currently, the Tasmanian Rugby Union holds a variety of competitions for male and female players, in several age groups and divisions. The headquarters for the Tasmanian Rugby Union are at Rugby Park, Cornelian Bay, Tasmania.

Prior to the state's first rugby clubs in 1933, the sport's history in Tasmania dates back to the late 1840s, but remained largely sporadic due to the dominance of alternative football codes.

From its founding in 1934 and over its first decades the Tasmanian Rugby Union was in effect operated by the Northern Rugby Union (Launceston) and Southern Rugby Union (Hobart). These bodies jointly organised North vs South contests, a state club championship game, and Tasmanian representation as a precursor to the formal incorporation of the TRU and a statewide club competition.

== Rugby in Tasmania before the TRU founding (1934) ==
Rugby football was first played in Tasmania in 1847-49 by students at Christ College in Bishopsbourne. The college's headmaster was Rugby School old boy John Philip Gell. This remains the earliest known instance of the game being played in Australia, giving the current Christ College rugby union side (playing in the University of Tasmania in-house competition) the oldest rugby provenance of any club or team in the nation.

Rugby union rules, traditions, and features were contextually part of the colony's 1860s–1870s experimentation with various codes of football, and many early matches often leaned heavily toward rugby, including use of a cross-bar. Reports of Launceston FC's debut games in 1875 suggest it began as a rugby club, with matches on Windmill Hill Reserve featuring long runs while carrying the ball, scoring "touchdowns" (tries), and attempting subsequent conversion goal-kicks.

Despite no domestic rugby union presence, three Tasmanians gained international honours in the sport, namely Lyndhurst Giblin (for England 1896-97), Allan 'Bill' Stewart (Scotland 1913-14) and Henry Yule Braddon (New Zealand in 1884). Tasmanian-born brothers John 'Jack' Ford and Eric E. Ford who moved to Sydney when young boys, later played for Australia (now the Wallabies) in the 1920s.

Local club rugby union football in Tasmania began in 1933 under the Northern Rugby Union (Launceston) and Southern Rugby Union (Hobart). The first North v South representative game was played in August 1933 at South Hobart Oval.

== Affiliated Clubs ==
As at the end of 2019, there are 13 clubs which make up the TRU.

Ten of these clubs field senior men's sides, eight field senior women's sides, and five field junior sides. There is also a "golden oldies" club for players aged 35+.

Club	Colours	Teams	Nickname(s)	Home Ground	Entered Union
Burnie RUFC	Blue & Red	Men's	Emus	Upper Burnie Sports Ground	1961 (reformed 1997)
Devonport RUFC	Green with Black	Men's, Women's, Junior's	Bulls	Don Oval	1964
Eastern Suburbs RUFC	Maroon with White	Men's, Women's, Juniors, Golden Oldies (35+)	Roosters, Chicks	North Warrane Oval	1964
Glenorchy RUFC	Black	Men's, Women's, Juniors	Stags	Eady Street Sports Ground	1935
Hobart Convicts RUFC	Grey & Black	Golden Oldies (35+)	Convicts	No set Ground	???
Hobart Harlequins RUFC	Green, Blue, Red & Black	Men's, Women's, Golden Oldies (35+)	Quins, Queens	Rugby Park	1933
Hobart Hutchins Lions RUFC	Grey, Black, Yellow & Magenta	Men's, Juniors (association with The Hutchins School)	Lions	War Memorial Oval	1974
Launceston RUFC	Black, Red & Gold	Men's	Tigers	Royal Park	1999
North West RUFC	Purple with Black	Women's	Panthers	Upper Burnie Sports Ground	2018
Tamar Valley RUFC	Orange & Teal	Women's	Vixens	Royal Park	2017
Taroona RUFC	Blue & White	Men's, Women's, Juniors, Golden Oldies (35+)	Penguins	Rugby Park	1947
University of Tasmania RUFC	Red	Men's, Women's	Red Men, Red Women	UTAS Rugby Ground	1933
Australian Maritime College RUFC currently in recess	Light Blue with Royal Blue Trim	Men's	Vikings	Royal Park	2012

The Tasmanian Rugby Union Referee's Association is also directly affiliated with the TRU.

=== Defunct clubs ===
- Associates
  - The club was formed in 1964 as the University Associates Rugby Football Club. The club won six First Grade Southern and State Premierships in 1965, 1967, 1970, 1971, 1972 and 1984. The club also won 3 Reserve Grade Premierships in 1965, 1981 and 1982.
- West Coast
- George Town
- Wellington
- Port Dalrymple
- Glen Dhu
- Riverview
  - Glen Dhu and Riverview merged in 1998 to become the Launceston Rugby Union Club (Tigers)
- Williamsford
- Australian Maritime College Vikings
- Army Rugby Club
  - Reportedly played in a dark green jumper with a white V

== Divisions ==
Rugby Union in Tasmania consists of the following divisions: Men's Premiership (First Grade), Men's Championship (Reserve Grade), Women's, Junior Under 18, Junior Under 16, Juniors Under 14 and Tassie Devils (under 12).

== Partnerships ==
=== Rugby Balls ===
The Tasmanian Rugby Union uses W RUGBY branded rugby balls across all divisions during matches.

== 2019 Senior Men's competition ==
There were 11 teams from 9 clubs competing in the club rugby divisions These were:

Premiership Grade

- Devonport Rugby Union Club
- Glenorchy Rugby Union Club
- Hobart Harlequins Rugby Union Club
- Hobart Lions Rugby Union Club
- Taroona Rugby Union Club
- Australian Maritime College Rugby Union Club – withdrawn from competition prior to start of season

Championship Grade

- Burnie Rugby Union Club
- Eastern Suburbs Rugby Union Club
- Hobart Harlequins Rugby Union Club
- Launceston Rugby Union Club
- Taroona Rugby Union Club
- University of Tasmania Rugby Union Club

Tasmanian Rugby Union
- Sport: Rugby union
- Number of teams: 9
- Holders: Premiership Launceston Championship Eastern Suburbs (2019)
- Most titles: Glenorchy Rugby Union Football Club Est.1935 "The Black Stags" (10+ titles)

=== Premierships ===
Season	Grand Final winners
Season	Premiership/First Grade	Championship/Reserve Grade
2024	Launceston	Hobart Lions
2023	Launceston
2022	Launceston	Launceston
2021	Devonport	Launceston
2020	Taroona	Launceston
2019	Devonport	Eastern Suburbs
2018	Taroona	Glenorchy
2017	Devonport	University of Tasmania
2016	Taroona
2015	Taroona
2014	Devonport
2013	Hobart Harlequins	University of Tasmania
2012	Taroona
2011	Glenorchy
2010	Taroona
2009	Hobart Lions
2008	Glenorchy
2007	Taroona
2006	Launceston
2005	University of Tasmania
2004	Launceston
2003	Glenorchy
2002	Glenorchy
2001	Glenorchy
2000	University of Tasmania
1999	Launceston
1998	Launceston
1997	No record	Riverview (Launceston)
1996	No record
1995	Glenorchy
1994	Glenorchy
1993	Glenorchy
1992	Glenorchy	Glenorchy
1991	Glenorchy	Glenorchy
1990	University
1989	No record
1988	Hobart Harlequins
1987	Taroona
1986	Glenorchy
1985	Glenorchy
1984	No record
1983	Taroona	Glenorchy
1982	Taroona
1981	Eastern Suburbs
1980	Glenorchy
1979	Taroona	Glenorchy
1978	No record
1977	Glenorchy
1976	Glenorchy	Glenorchy
1975	Glenorchy
1974	Hobart Harlequins
1973	Glenorchy
1968	Taroona
1967	No record	Glenorchy

== 2019 Senior Women's competition ==
Generally, senior women's competitions consist of a series of sevens tournaments spread across the year along with several games of 15s format. There were nine clubs competing in the club rugby divisions

These were:

- Devonport Rugby Club
- Eastern Suburbs RUFC, identified from the men's team as "the Chicks"
- Glenorchy Rugby Union Football Club
- Hobart Harlequins Rugby Union Club, identified from the men's team as "the Queens"
- North West Panthers Rugby Club
- Tamar Valley Vixens Rugby Club
- Taroona Rugby Club
- University of Tasmania Rugby Union Club, identified from the men's team as the "Red Women"

== Representative teams ==
Tasmania

Names
- Nickname: Jackjumpers
- Former nickname: Bumble Bees

Club details
- Competition: Australian Rugby Shield
- Ground: Rugby Park

Jack Jumpers colours

The senior men's state representative side for the Tasmanian Rugby Union are the Tasmanian Jack Jumpers, named for the jack jumper ant (Myrmecia pilosula), a species of venomous bull ant commonly found in Tasmania.

From 2018 an additional competition was formed for teams from so-called "Minor States", called the Emerging States Championship, featuring the Jack Jumpers, Northern Territory Mosquitoes, Adelaide Black Falcons and Victoria Country Barbarians. The first Competition was held in Adelaide in September 2018, and the Black Falcons were the inaugural winners.

- 2018 NRC Division 2 Runner Up

== Notable players ==
- Adam Coleman, Wallaby 895, and currently playing for London Irish
- Eddie Jones, Head Coach of the Wallabies, Japan Sakuras and England national team, born in Burnie, Tasmania
- Jack Ford, Wallaby 224, 11 caps, born in Sheffield, Tasmania
- Eric E. Ford, Wallaby 240, 7 caps, born in Launceston, Tasmania
- Justin Collins, Flanker – Chiefs 1998–1999 (10 caps), Blues 1999–2009 (92 caps)
- Ollie Atkins, Waratahs, Edinburgh, Scotland A, Exeter Chiefs, Rouen-Normandie

== See also ==
- National Rugby Sevens Championships
- List of Australian club rugby union competitions
