= Harold Tolhurst =

- Full name: Harold Ambrose Tolhurst
- Born: 4 July 1911 Brewarrina, NSW, Australia
- Died: 13 October 1988 (aged 77)

Rugby union career
- Position: Wing
International career
Years	Team	Apps	(Points)
1931	Australia	2	(0)

Harold Ambrose Tolhurst (4 July 1911 — 13 October 1988) was an Australian rugby union international.

Raised in rural New South Wales, Tolhurst was born in Brewarrina and attended St. Joseph's School, Nyngan.

Tolhurst played his rugby in Sydney and was a product of Drummoyne juniors. He briefly played first-grade for Glebe-Balmain, before transferring to Manly in 1930. A winger, Tolhurst gained a Wallabies call up for the 1931 tour of New Zealand, where he featured in Tests against NZ Maori in Palmerston North and the All Blacks in Auckland.

Retiring as a player in 1939, Tolhurst went on to referee the two Sydney Tests in the 1951 Bledisloe Cup and received praise after the series from All Blacks team manager Stan Botting for his handling of the matches.

== See also ==
- List of Australia national rugby union players
