= James Cleeve =

Australian cricketer

Personal information
- Born: 14 February 1864; Sydney, Australia
- Died: 8 February 1909 (aged 44); Moree, New South Wales, Australia
- Source: ESPNcricinfo, 24 December 2016

James Oatley Cleeve (14 February 1864 – 8 February 1909) was an Australian cricketer. He played three first-class matches for New South Wales between 1882/83 and 1883/84 while still a student at Newington College.

Cleeve and his twin brother, John Cleeve (14 February 1864 – 7 April 1952) were born in Woolloomooloo, New South Wales to John Cleeve, Police magistrate of Penrith, New South Wales, and Frances "Fanny" (née Oatley). The Cleve boys attended Newington College from 1881 until 1884 whilst the cricketer Joseph Coates was Headmaster.

== See also ==
- List of New South Wales representative cricketers
