= Eightball Tasmania =

Eightball Tasmania, formed in 1983 is the governing body in Tasmania, Australia for the sport of Eightball pool, a cue sport.

Tasmania became a founding member in 1983 of the Australian Eight Ball Federation.

The federation holds annual championships for team and individual for men's and ladies representation for Tasmania at the annual National championships of Australia.

== Member associations ==
- Devonport Eightball Association
- Burnie / Somerset Eightball Association
- Esk Eightball Association
- Northern Tasmanian Eightball Association
- South Eastern Tasmania Eightball Association
- Southern Tasmanian Eightball Association

== Notable Representative Title ==
World Titles

- 2015 World Junior Team World Champions - Australia - Alexander Pace (ESRUFC)

Runner Up

- 2010 World Junior Singles Final - Anthony Adams

Australian Team Representation

- 2015 Australian Team Captain - Jeremy McGuire (SETEBA/Midway Point Tavern)
- 2015 Australian Junior Team Vice Captain - Alexander Pace (SETEBA/ESRUFC)
- 2015 Australian Junior Team Representative - Alexander Pace (SETEBA/ESRUFC)
- 2010 Australian Junior Team Captain - Anthony Adams (SETEBA/Belatana)
- 2008 Australian Junior Team Representative - Anthony Adams (SETEBA/Beltana)
- 2009 Australian Junior Team Representative - Anthony Adams (SETEBA/Belatana)
- 2010 Australian Junior Team Representative - Anthony Adams (SETEBA/Belatana), Chris Forsyth (SETEBA/Foreshore)

Australian Titles

- 2011 Australian Junior Team Champions - Tasmania - Manager Cyrill Triffett (SETEBA/Beltana)
- 2010 Australian Under 18 Singles Champion - Anthony Adams (SETEBA/Beltana/Tasmania)
- 2009 Australian Junior Team Champions - Tasmania -Manager Cyrill Triffett (SETEBA/Beltana), Anthony Adams (SETEBA/Beltana), Alexander Pace (SETEBA/ESRUFC)

Tasmanian Titles

- 2015 Tasmanian State Singles Title - Jeremy McGuire (Midway Point Tavern)
- 2015 R/U Tasmanian State Singles Title - Alexander Pace (ESRUFC)
