= Australian Eight Ball Federation =

The Australian Eight Ball Federation (or Eight Ball Federation Incorporated), formed in 1983 is the governing body in Australia for the sport of eight-ball pool, a cue sport also standardised under the name blackball, and distinct from the American-style game of eight-ball, itself subject to international competition.

Australia became a founding member in 1992 of the World Eightball Pool Federation.

The federation holds annual championships for team and individual for men's and ladies representation for Australia at the annual world championships.

== Member organisations ==
Founding Members (1983):

- Northern Territory – Northern Territory Eightball Association
- Queensland – Queensland Eight Ball Federation
- South Australia – Eight-Ball Association of SA
- Tasmania – Eightball Tasmania
- Victoria – Pool Victoria
- Western Australia – West Australian Eightball Federation (Inc)

Later members:

- New South Wales (1987) – NSW 8 Ball Federation
- Australian Capital Territory (1990) – ACT Eight Ball Association (ACTEBA)
