= Australian Police Rugby Union =

Blue Tongues
- Sport: Rugby union
- Founded: 1998; 2006 (re-estd.)
- ARU affiliation: 1998
- Website: www.apru.rugbynet.com.au

The Australian Police Rugby Union is a volunteer, not for profit organisation aimed at promoting the sport of rugby union and the fostering of relations amongst serving police officers from across Australia and other rugby union playing nations.

== History ==
The Australian Police Rugby Union Association Inc. (A.P.R.U.) was first established in 1998 with a view to travelling to the 1999 IRB Rugby World Cup in Wales, Ireland and England. A team comprising representatives predominantly from New South Wales and the Australian Federal Police departed and played a number of games against the London Metropolitan Police, Irish Garda, Welsh and Combined British Police sides, with mixed success. Shortly after this Tour, the A.P.R.U. was disbanded.

After a number of years in the wilderness, the A.P.R.U. were re-established in 2006, with a view to selected players from across Australia competing in several representative matches each year.

In 2007, the A.P.R.U. again travelled to the United Kingdom and Ireland in a Tour to coincide with the 2007 IRB Rugby World Cup. The players on this Tour represented all states and territories of Australia. Matches were played against the London Metropolitan, Welsh, Scottish, Irish Garda and Combined British Police teams. The A.P.R.U. were highly competitive winning two games and being narrowly defeated in two others.

Following the 2008 National Championships, a representative was chosen to travel to New Zealand for a Tour coinciding with the Bledisloe Cup. The A.P.R.U. were unfortunate to be beaten by better sides in their first 2 encounters, but bounced back to take the third game against Northland Police.

The Blue Tongues team undertook a short two-game tour of Fiji in 2011, playing the Fiji Police in Nadi and Suva.

== National Championships ==
The A.P.R.U. National Championships are held bi-annually, with Police teams from states and territories within Australia competing.

| Year | Location | Men's Champion | Women's Champion | Ref |
|---|---|---|---|---|
| 2006 | Coffs Harbour, New South Wales | New South Wales | | |
| 2008 | Melbourne, Victoria | Queensland | | |
| 2010 | Kawana Waters, Queensland | New South Wales | | |
| 2012 | Cottesloe, Western Australia | Western Australia | | |
| 2014 | Clarence Gardens, South Australia | New South Wales | | |
| 2016 | Canberra, Australian Capital Territory | New South Wales | | |
| 2018 | Wollongong | Queensland | Victoria | |

== See also ==
- Australian Defence Force Rugby League
