= Lars Hedberg =

- Full name: Lars Eric Christian Hedberg
- Born: 20 September 1948 (age 78) Sydney, NSW, Australia

Rugby union career
- Position: Prop
Provincial / State sides
Years	Team	Apps	(Points)
- New South Wales
International career
Years	Team	Apps	(Points)
1974	Australia		

Lars Eric Christian Hedberg (born 20 September 1948) is an Australian former international rugby union player.

Born in Sydney, Hedberg learned his rugby as a Cranbrook School pupil and afterwards played for Hawkesbury Agricultural College, which had a team in the second division of Sydney rugby. He was subsequently employed by the Soil Conservation Service, basing him in country New South Wales.

Hedberg, a prop, started out in country rugby with Goulburn and earned ACT representative honours. This was followed by selection to the NSW Country XV, through which he gained experience against international opposition, including the 1971 Springboks. He debuted for the NSW Waratahs in 1972 and two years later made the Wallabies squad for the second international against the touring 1974 All Blacks, replacing reserve prop Ron Graham who came into the XV for an injured John Meadows. On the bench for two Test matches, Hedberg never got a chance to take the field.

== See also ==
- List of Australia national rugby union players
