= Goulburn Rugby Union =

Australian rugby union club, based in Goulburn, NSW

(Australia) Goulburn Rugby Union
- Full name: Goulburn Rugby Union Football Club
- Union: ACT & Sthn NSW Rugby Union
- Nickname: Reds
- Founded: 22 July 1872; 154 years ago
- League(s): First Division (ACT & Sthn NSW)

Official website
- goulburnrugbyunion.com

Goulburn Rugby Union Football Club (Goulburn RUFC) is a rugby union club based in the city of Goulburn, New South Wales. The original Goulburn FC was formed in 1872 and two years later was a founding member of the Southern Rugby Football Union (now the NSWRU). The present Goulburn RUFC was reformed in 1957 and on a rugby-provenance basis is per 1872 the oldest country (regional) club in Australia.

== The beginning ==
The Goulburn Rugby Club was initially formed in Goulburn on Monday 22 July 1872 at a meeting held at Payten's Commercial Hotel in Goulburn. The driving force behind the club's formation was Valentine Blomfield Riley, a Bowral born former Sydney University FC player and captain who had moved to Goulburn in 1872 to open a surveying company with his father. It was Riley who called the meeting to found the club, took on the position of secretary and then spread the gospel of rugby throughout the Southern Tablelands and Monaro regions through his travels in his role as a surveyor.

Goulburn was the second rugby club to be founded in regional Australia, just weeks after the Albion FC in Maitland. The Goulburn club's first match against an external opponent was in 1873 against the Garroorigang School (a boarding and day school for boys located in Goulburn). In 1874 it joined Australia's original rugby body, the Southern Rugby Union, and teams from the various Sydney clubs frequently travelled to Goulburn to play or welcomed Goulburn as visitors to play them. In 1882, fleet-footed Goulburn winger Stuart H Belcher became the first ever country based player to play in the NSW side. His first match was against Queensland and he celebrated his selection with a try.

== Local competition ==
By 1893 Goulburn was itself a complete branch of the NSW Rugby Union (as the Southern Rugby Union had been known since 1892) and hosted a strong rugby competition of its own. In 1900, the Goulburn representative team, known as Central Southern Rugby Union, played the reigning Sydney premiers, the Glebe Dirty Reds and beat them by 26–6. While Goulburn pre-dates the Glebe club (later the Drummoyne Rugby Club), Goulburn would later adopt the Dirty Reds title as their own due to the maroon jumper they have worn since 1959.

In 1914 a rugby league exhibition match between Annandale and Western Suburbs was played in Goulburn and such was the interest that league clubs were set to form almost instantly. The issue was deemed so important that a town meeting was called with the mayor suggesting that the town could only support one of the rugby codes and should put all of its resources behind that code. Rugby league won although the first world war was to deprive Goulburn of both codes.

Rugby took some time to become re-established in towns after the war, and Goulburn was no exception. There were several attempts during the 1920s and 1930s, and by 1939, the competition had once again become Goulburn-based. The best players from that team played against a Canberra representative side and defeated them 30–10, but then the war came and disrupted the competition once again. After the war, it again took some time for rugby to resume, with a few more false starts before things were up and running again in the 1950

The club was operating with limited success in 1952 and in 1953 there was again a Goulburn-based competition but midway through 1954 it folded again. In 1957 the present Goulburn club was established, taking part in the ACT competition, and lost to Royals in the Canberra Cup grand final.

== Current incarnation ==
In 1957, the Goulburn Rugby Union Football Club was officially reformed. It played with one side, then in 1959 two sides and in 1967 consisted of three grades. From 1957 until 1973 Goulburn played in the ACT competition. From 1974 until 1978 it competed in the now defunct Southern Tablelands Rugby competition, which was for the latter part of that period headquartered in Goulburn. From 1979 until 1982 Goulburn played in the Illawarra competition, before returning to the ACT from 1983 to 1985. In 1986 it was back to the Illawarra where Goulburn stayed until 1989, before finally moving to its current home, the Monaro Rugby competition.

Despite numerous grand final appearances, premierships have been elusive. There were no premierships in the 50s and 60s but the club's most successful period wasn't far off. During the period Goulburn played in the Southern Tablelands competition they won four successive first grade premierships ('74, '75, '76, '77) with a handful of premierships in reserves and Colts at the same time. In 1981, the Reds won the Illawarra reserve grade grand final against arch enemies Vikings and Goulburn's next piece of grand final silverware came its way in 1992 when third grade beat Canberra Uni.

In 2007 Goulburn finally climbed to the top of the mountain again with a first grade grand final win over Tuggeranong and a reserve grade victory over Royals, both at Poidevin Oval. First grade made it back to back titles in 2008 when they beat Cooma, also at Poidevin Oval and made it three in a row in 2009 with a last gasp win against ADFA. All three grand finals were under the coaching of Matt O'Rourke who had begun his association with the Goulburn club in 1986 as a player.

In 1996 the club officially christened and opened Poidevin Oval, the main ground at Goulburn Rugby Park that had been owned through Rugby Park Trust since the early '70s, and then in 2011 the club opened its new expanded clubhouse.

Goulburn Rugby Union Football Club now operates teams across all ages and genders, starting with the Fizzy Reds competition (Under 6 – Under 12), the Tablelands Reds (Under 13 – Under 18), Dirty Reds (senior first and second grade teams), Fermented Reds (Over 35s) and Flirty Reds (women's team).

== Representative players ==
Among Goulburn's greatest representative players are such names as Simon Poidevin, Peter Lucas, John Klem, John Langford, Geoff Richardson, Warwick Watkins, Bruce Bailey, Lars Hedberg, Ken Player, John Shiel, Vince Fester, Gordon Cabot, Paul Southwell, Garry Brims, and Bruce Blackley.
