= Hobart Harlequins Rugby Union Club =

Tasmanian rugby union team

(Australia) Hobart Harlequins Rugby Club
- Nickname: Harlequins or 'Quins'
- Founded: 1933; 93 years ago
- Location: Cornelian Bay, Tasmania, Australia
- Ground: Rugby Park
- League: Tasmanian Rugby Union
Team kit

Official website
- www.harlequins.com.au

Hobart Harlequins Rugby Club is a rugby union club based in Cornelian Bay, Tasmania, Australia. Established in 1933, the club is a member of the Tasmanian Rugby Union and Tasmanian Rugby Union Juniors, affiliated with the Australian Rugby Union and plays in the Tasmanian Statewide League.

The club's home ground is at Rugby Park in Cornelian Bay. Known as the Harlequins or Quins, the club colours are Blue, Red, Green and Black. The club currently fields a teams in Men's First and Second Divisions, a Senior Women's squad and junior teams. Notable player is Adam Coleman.

Premierships

Senior Team

- Premiers First Grade 1936,1937,1938,1946,1947,1948, 1953,1957,1959,1963;1964,1974,1988,2013
- Premiers Second Grade 1949, 1995, 2006
- Premiers u16 2010

(Recess 1940–1945)

== See also ==
- List of sports clubs inspired by others
