= Australian Maritime College Rugby Union Club =

Australian rugby union club, based in Launceston, Tasmania

(Australia) Australian Maritime College Rugby Union Football Club
- Nickname: AMC or The Vikings
- Founded: 2012; 14 years ago
- Location: Launceston, Tasmania, Australia
- Ground: Royal Park
- League: Tasmanian Rugby Union
Team kit

Official website
- amcvikings.rugbynet.com.au

Australian Maritime College Rugby Union Football Club is a rugby union club based in Launceston, Tasmania, Australia. Established in 2012, the club is a member of the Tasmanian Rugby Union, affiliated with the Australian Rugby Union and played in the Tasmanian Statewide League until 2019.

The club's home ground was at Royal Park in the Launceston. Known as the Vikings or AMC, the club colours are navy blue and white. The club formerly fielded a team in the Men's First Division.
