= Onkaparinga Rugby Union Football Club =

Onkaparinga Rugby Union Football Club, established 1968, is located at Wilfred Taylor Reserve, Sports Park Drive in Morphett Vale, South Australia.

Also known as "The Red Devils", Onkaparinga plays in all grades of the South Australian Rugby Union competition. This includes senior men and women and junior grades from under 7 through to under 18. Onkas also host a touch football competition during the summer months for open and mixed grades.

== Club Profile ==
The Onkaparinga Rugby Union Football Club is one of 13 rugby clubs in South Australia. The club was established in 1968 and moved to its present grounds at Wilfred Taylor Reserve in 1982.

The club rooms are built on council property. In 2009, the club underwent a substantial building extension at a cost of approximately $700,000. The ground lights were upgraded at a cost of $140,000.

== Premierships ==
Onkaparinga have won two First Division premierships, in 1987 and 2015.
