= Port Adelaide RUFC =

Australian rugby union club, based in Adelaide, SA

Port Adelaide Pirates
- Union: Rugby Union South Australia
- Nickname: Pirates
- Founded: 1933; 93 years ago
- Location: Port Adelaide, South Australia
- Ground(s): Riverside Oval, Langham Place, Port Adelaide, SA 5015
Team kit

Port Adelaide Rugby Union Football Club, also known as The Pirates, is a rugby union club in Adelaide, South Australia. The team was founded in 1933. They play at Riverside Oval in black and white hooped jerseys.

== History ==
The Port Adelaide Rugby Club was formed in 1933 to play in the South Australian Rugby Union competition, as reported in Adelaide's newspaper, The Advertiser:

A newly formed Rugby club, Port Adelaide, played its first match against the Navy at Pennington. The result of the match, although in favour of the more experienced club, speaks very highly for the possibilities of the newcomers to the game. Messrs. Case and Copeman, formerly of the Adelaide club, have raised the club and coached the team. Navy won by 19 to 9.

— The Advertiser, Adelaide, 10 July 1933.

Since its inception, the club has won the 1st Division premiership twice. Port Adelaide's first premiership, won in an undefeated 12-match season in 1946, was regarded as "unofficial" as no full-strength competition was conducted during World War 2. However, in 2002, Port Adelaide won the grand final 27–16 against Old Collegians to claim the official premiership.

Port Adelaide Rugby Union Football Club is the only club affiliated with all navy ships and they regularly play friendly matches against visiting Australian and Foreign ships.
