= Glenorchy Rugby Union Football Club =

Australian rugby union club, based in Glenorchy, Tasmania

(Australia) Glenorchy Rugby Union Football Club
- Nickname: The Stags
- Founded: 1935; 91 years ago
- Location: Glenorchy, Tasmania, Australia
- Ground: Eady Street
- League: Tasmanian Rugby Union
Team kit

Official website
- glenorchy.rugbynet.com.au

Glenorchy Rugby Union Football Club is a Rugby Union club in Tasmania. Established in 1935, the club is a member of the Tasmanian Rugby Union, affiliated with the Australian Rugby Union and plays in the Tasmanian Statewide League.

The club's home ground is at Eady Street in the Glenorchy, Tasmania. Known as The Stags, the club colours are black and white. The club currently fields teams in Men's First Division and Juniors competitions

Premierships

Senior Team

- Statewide Premiers First Grade 1939, 1991, 1992, 1993, 1994, 1995, 1996, 2001, 2002, 2003, 2008, 2011
- Statewide Premiers Reserve Grade

2018

Women's Team

- Statewide Premiers First Grade 2008

Juniors

- Under 18 Premiers 2008
- Under 14 Premiers 2005
- Under 16 Premiers 2024
