= Taroona Rugby Club =

Australian rugby union club, based in Cornelian Bay, Tasmania

(Australia) Taroona Rugby Club
- Nickname: The Penguins or The Blues
- Founded: 1947; 79 years ago
- Location: Cornelian Bay, Tasmania, Australia
- Ground: Rugby Park
- League: Tasmanian Rugby Union
1st kit	2nd kit

Official website
- taroonarugby.rugbynet.com.au

Taroona Rugby Club is a rugby union club in based in Cornelian Bay, Tasmania, Australia. Established in 1947, the club is a member of the Tasmanian Rugby Union and Tasmanian Rugby Union Juniors, affiliated the Australian Rugby Union, and plays in the Tasmanian Statewide League.

The club's home ground is at Rugby Park in Cornelian Bay. Known as the Penguins or Blues, the club colours are blue, white and red. The club currently fields teams in Men's First and Second Divisions, a Senior Women's squad and the Juniors competitions.

Premierships

Senior Team

Statewide First Grade

1968, 1979, 1982, 1983, 1986, 1987, 2007, 2010, 2012, 2015, 2016, 2018, 2020

Reserves Grade Premiers

1968, 1978, 1980, 1981, 1982, 1986, 1988, 1989, 1993, 2007, 2010, 2011, 2012

Juniors Under 18 Boys Premiers

2011

Juniors Under 16 Boys Premiers

2015,2018

Juniors Under 14 Boys Premiers

2013, 2014,2018
