= Devonport Rugby Club =

Australian rugby union club, based in Devonport, Tasmania

(Australia) Devonport Rugby Club
- Nickname: The Bulls
- Founded: 1964; 62 years ago
- Location: Devonport, Tasmania, Australia
- Ground: The Don Rugby Oval
- League: Tasmanian Rugby Union
Team kit

Official website
- devonportbulls.rugbynet.com.au

Devonport Rugby Club Est. 1964 is a Rugby Union club at the Don in Devonport, Tasmania. The club is a member of the Tasmanian Rugby Union and Tasmanian Rugby Union Juniors, affiliated with the Australian Rugby Union and plays in the Tasmanian Statewide League.

The club's home ground is at The Don Rugby Oval in Devonport, Tasmania. Known as The Bulls, the club colours are green and black. The club currently fields teams in Men's First Division and Juniors competitions

Premierships

Senior Team

- Statewide Premiers First Grade: 2014, 2017, 2019 & 2021
- Statewide Premiers Second Grade: 1999, 2000, 2001, 2005, 2007
- Northern Premiers: 1984, 1985

In 2016, Devonport were booted from the finals series after being found guilty of playing an unregistered player in their home final against Eastern Suburbs.

In 2017, the Devonport Bulls recovered from a disappointing end to their 2016 campaign to once again make the statewide grand final, beating the Taroona Penguins who were entering the Grand Final undefeated.
