= Burnie Rugby Union Club =

Tasmanian rugby union team

(Australia) Burnie Rugby Union Club
- Nickname: The Emus
- Founded: 1961, Recess 1988, Reformed 1997
- Location: Burnie, Tasmania, Australia
- Ground: Upper burnie sports centre
- League: Tasmanian Rugby Union
Team kit

Official website
- burnie.rugbynet.com.au

Burnie Rugby Union Club is a rugby union club based in Burnie, Tasmania, Australia. It was established in 1961, was dormant in the late 1980s and reformed in 1997. The club is a member of the Tasmanian Rugby Union, affiliated with the Australian Rugby Union, and plays in the Tasmanian Statewide League men's First Division.

The club's home ground is at Upper Burnie sports centre in the Burnie. Known as "the Emus", the club colours are blue and red. The club fields a team in Men's First Division along with a Women's team in the statewide competition.

== History - post-reformation ==
The club was reformed in 1997 after a seven-year absence from competition. With the encouragement of Ron Willet, a prop forward and Northern Tasmanian President from Launceston, meetings commenced with Ken Allan & Shane Bentley at Burnie’s Beach hotel. Former Burnie president Brett "Crusty" Kershaw came on board as player and treasurer. Peter Letcher was recruited as coach for the side. Warren and Robbie Taylor came on board as manager and secretary respectively.

Past player Fergie Baird assisted in locating some lost funds that had been set aside for future club use. Kershaw paid for the club's first insurance bill and the Emus were reestablished.

The Northern Competition at that time comprised Burnie, Devonport, two Launceston teams, Georgetown, and the West Coast Miners (the last two are now defunct). The Emus played in the Acton Rugby and Softball ground which they shared in and developed. In 2003, the club moved to the Montello Sporting Grounds, the home of the Burnie United Soccer Club. After six years the club parted ways with Montello and moved to the McKenna Park Regional Sporting Complex in early 2009.

Burnie has played in three Northern Grand Finals since 1997, winning one in 2003 defeating Launceston at Montello Sporting Ground in a memorable 14 -10. Big Willie Johnson scored the winning try under the posts with Josh Baldwin converting to secure the victory on the day. Burnie had narrowly lost in two grand finals to the Devonport Bulls.

In 2008, after its first season of the Statewide Second Division, Burnie won the championship with a more than convincing victory over Glenorchy.

In 2009, the Emus participated in the revised Statewide First Division Competition. Burnie is back in the Statewide First Division after a 20-year absence.

== Officials ==
The current President is Isabella Hardy, the first female and youngest person to ever take on the role. Women's coach Brett "Crusty" Kershaw is Vice President. Vanessa Davies is the current Secretary and Melissa Coull is the Treasurer.

== Premierships ==
Senior Team

- Northern Championship: 1964, 2003
- Statewide Second Division: 2008
- Statewide First Division: 1979,1986
