= University of Tasmania Rugby Union Club =

Australian rugby union club, based in Sandy Bay, Tasmania

(Australia) University of Tasmania Rugby Union Club
- Nickname: The Reds
- Founded: 1933; 93 years ago
- Location: Sandy Bay, Tasmania, Australia
- Ground: University of Tasmania
- League: Tasmanian Rugby Union
1st kit	2nd kit

Official website
- www.universityrfc.com

University of Tasmania Rugby Union Club is a rugby union club in Sandy Bay, Tasmania, Australia. Established in 1933, the club is a member of the Tasmanian Rugby Union, affiliated with the Australian Rugby Union and plays in the Tasmanian Statewide League. The club was a founding member of the Tasmanian Rugby Union.

The club's home ground is at the University of Tasmania on Sandy Bay Road in Sandy Bay. Known as The Red Men, the club colours are red and white. The club currently fields a team in Men's First and Reserve Division competitions.

Premierships

Senior Team

- Premiers First Grade 1934, 1935 ....
- Reserves Grade 2013

(Recess 1940–45)
