= Launceston Rugby Union Football Club =

Australian rugby union club, based in Launceston, Tasmania

(Australia) Launceston Rugby Union Football Club
- Nickname: The Tigers or "Tiga-Tiga"
- Founded: 1999; 27 years ago
- Location: Launceston, Tasmania, Australia
- Ground: Royal Park
- League: Tasmanian Rugby Union
Team kit	2nd kit

Official website
- launceston.rugbynet.com.au

Launceston Rugby Union Football Club is a rugby union club based in Launceston, Tasmania, Australia. Established in 1998, the club is a member of the Tasmanian Rugby Union and Tasmanian Rugby Union Juniors, affiliated with the Australian Rugby Union and plays in the Tasmanian Statewide League.

The club's home ground is at Royal Park in the Launceston. Known as the Tigers the club colours are red, yellow and black, with a Tasmanian Tiger adorning the club's logo. The club currently fields two teams in Men's First Division ("Premiership"), a team in Women's First Division and an under 16 Boys team.

The club resulted from a merger of the Glen Dhu Rugby Club and the Riverview Rugby Club in 1998 following an undefeated run by Riverview in 1997 winning the Reserves grade against West Coast with a score of 62-10. The merger of the two Launceston based clubs resulted in back to back Premierships for Launceston in 1998 and 1999 before losing the State Grand Final to the University of Tasmania in 2000. They then won the title again in 2004 and 2006.

After "fifteen long years" the club won the 2022 Statewide Premiership with a successful penalty kick after the siren by John "Hot Tip" Dunbar. They then followed up with premierships in 2023 and 2024. T J Pieters won best afield honours each year of this threepeat, with all three victories being over the Taroona Penguins at Rugby Park.

Premierships

Senior team

- Statewide Premiers First Grade 1998, 1999
- Statewide Runners up First Grade 2000
- Statewide Premiers First Grade 2004
- Statewide Premiers First Grade 2006
- Statewide Runners up First Grade 2011
- Statewide Runners up First Grade 2021
- Statewide Premiers First Grade 2022, 2023, 2024 (season undefeated)

Reserve grade

- Riverview - Northern Premiers 1997 (season undefeated)
- Championship Winners 2019, 2020, 2021, 2022

Under 18

- Premiers 2007

Under 14

- Premiers 2006

Women's team

- Women's Sevens Spring Premiers 2016

*"fifteen long years" attributed to former Club President Ian Derson*
