= Hobart Lions Rugby Club =

Australian rugby union club, based in Sandy Bay, Tasmania

(Australia) Hobart Hutchins Lions Rugby Club
- Nickname: The Lions
- Founded: 1983; 43 years ago
- Location: Sandy Bay, Tasmania, Tasmania, Australia
- Ground: Rugby Park/ Hutchins War Memorial Oval
- President: Aleem Khalfan
- Coach: TBC
- League: Tasmanian Rugby Union
1st kit	2nd kit

Official website
- hobartlionsrugby.com.au

Hobart Lions Rugby Club (Officially Hobart Hutchins Rugby Union Football Club) is a rugby union club based in Sandy Bay, Tasmania, Australia. Established in 1983, the club is a member of the Tasmanian Rugby Union, is affiliated with the Australian Rugby Union, and plays in the Tasmanian Statewide Premiership League.

The club splits its home games between Rugby Park and the WMO. Known as the Lions, the club colours are grey, yellow, black and magenta. The club currently fields a team in the Men's First Division. The junior team is from the Hutchins School.

Premierships

Senior Team: 2009

Reserves: 1984, 2024
