= University of Western Australia Rugby Club =

UWA Rugby Club
- Full name: University of Western Australia Rugby Football Club
- Founded: 1929; 96 years ago
- Location: Mount Claremont, Perth
- Ground(s): UWA Sports Park (Capacity: 4,000)
- President: Zach de Graaf
- Coach(es): Greg Holmes
- Most appearances: Damian O'Donnell (503)
- Top scorer: Michael Hughes (2,107)
- Most tries: Ryan Lenegan (103)
- League(s): RugbyWA Premier Grade
- 2024: 1st of 5 (Conference B), Quarter-finals

Official website
- www.uwarugby.com

The University of Western Australia Rugby Club, also known as the UWA Rugby Club, is an Australian semi-professional rugby club based in Perth, Western Australia and is associated with the University of Western Australia (UWA). The club competes in the RugbyWA Premier Grade, the highest-tier of rugby exclusively played within the state of Western Australia.

The club was created in 1929 ahead of a match between Claremont-Cottesloe No. 2 that was played on Claremont Oval. This was also the teams first season. The club won two out of ten games in the A Grade division, finishing second-last. Cottesloe is also acknowledged to be the oldest rival of UWA, known as the "Original Feud".

Since the inclusion of the Perth-based Western Force rugby team into the Super Rugby competition in 2006, many players from the Western Force are "allocated" or "assigned" to a Premier Grade club such as the UWA Rugby Club.

== Honours ==
=== Premier Grade Premierships ===
| Year | Premiers | Score | Runners-up | Refs. |
|---|---|---|---|---|
| 2014 | UWA | 16–13 | Cottesloe | |
| 2011 | UWA | 15–13 | Nedlands | |
| 1972 | UWA | 7–6 | Western Suburbs | |
| 1968 | UWA | 9–8 | Western Suburbs | |
| 1967 | UWA | 30–9 | Nedlands | |
| 1958 | UWA | 11–8 (Note: after extra time.) | Western Suburbs | |
| 1954 | UWA | 20–6 | Cottesloe | |
| 1951 | UWA | 31–13 | Western Suburbs | |
| 1947 | South Perth | 17–18 | UWA | |
| 1941 | UWA | 13–10 | RAAF | |
| 1935 | UWA | 9–8 | Perth | |

== International representatives ==
As of 10 August 2024.

=== Australia ===
- Art Turnbull (1961)
- John Welborn (1996)
- Ryan Cross (2008)
- David Pocock (2008)
- Carlo Tizzano (2024)

== See also ==
- RugbyWA Premier Grade
- Rugby union in Western Australia
