= Jonah Placid =

Australian rugby union player

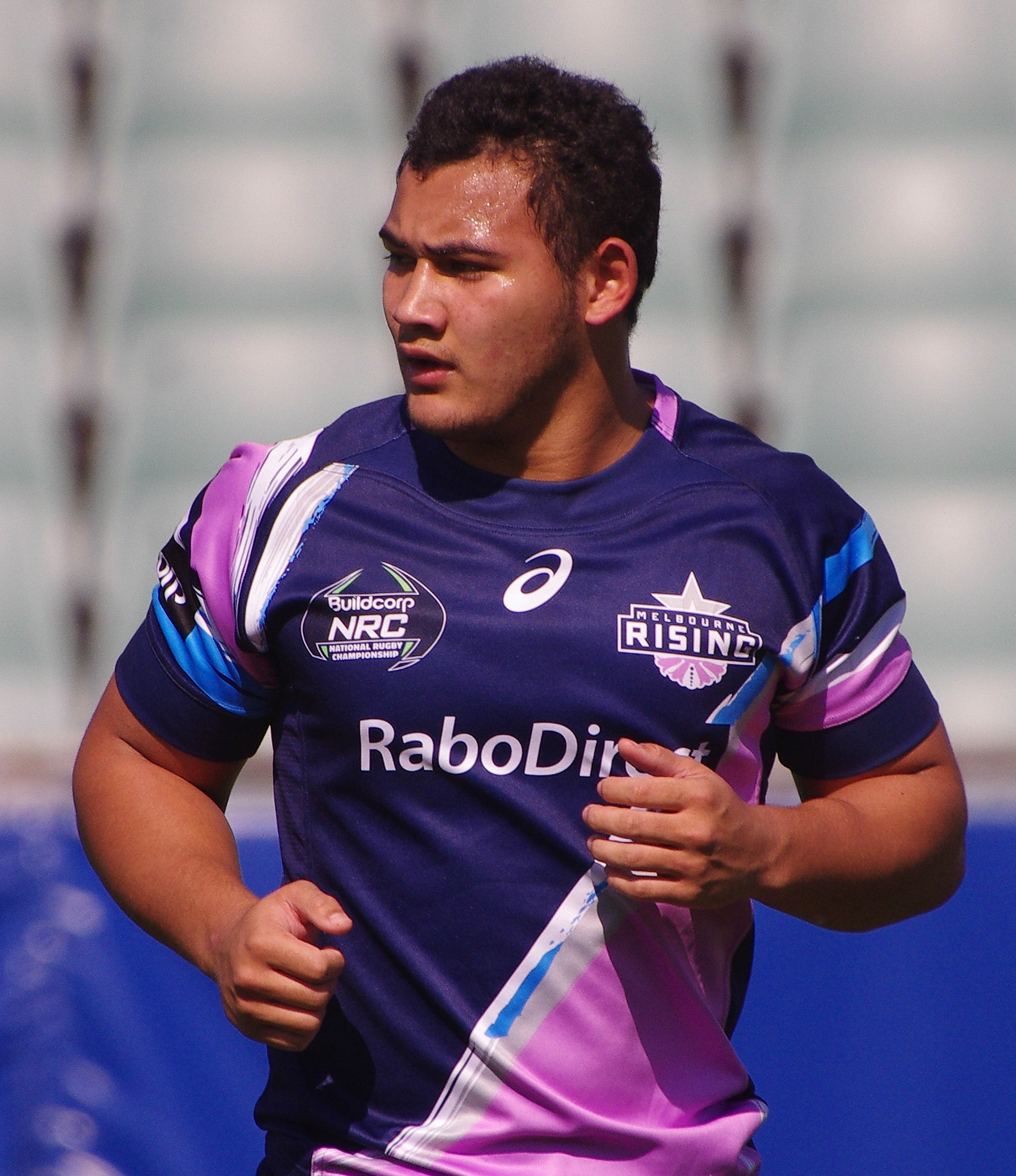
- Placid in 2014 playing for Melbourne Rising
- Born: Jonah Placid; 14 May 1995 (age 31) Orange, New South Wales, Australia
- Height: 1.81 m (5 ft 11 1/2 in)
- Weight: 96 kg (15 st 2 lb)
- School: Nudgee College

Rugby union career
- Position: Fullback
Amateur team(s)
Years	Team	Apps	(Points)
- Easts Wests Scarborough
Senior career
Years	Team	Apps	(Points)
2017–2020	Toulon	11	(0)
2019–2020	Western Force		
Provincial / State sides
Years	Team	Apps	(Points)
2014–2016	Melbourne Rising	24	(57)
- Correct as of 15 October 2016
Super Rugby
Years	Team	Apps	(Points)
2014	Reds	1	(0)
2015–2017	Rebels	18	(35)
- Correct as of 7 July 2017
International career
Years	Team	Apps	(Points)
2012	Australian Schoolboys	4	(0)
2013–2015	Australia U20	13	(25)
- Correct as of 20 June 2015

Jonah Placid (born 14 May 1995) is an Australian retired professional rugby union player. He played at fullback for the Rebels in Super Rugby. Domestically, he played for Easts in the Queensland Premier Rugby tournament.

== Career ==
Born in New South Wales, but raised in Rockhampton, Queensland, Placid first came to prominence playing for Easts Tigers and he helped them win the 2013 Queensland Premier Rugby Title. This saw him named in the Queensland Reds wider training squad for the 2014 Super Rugby season. Although this was largely a development contract and he seemed unlikely to be given any game time during the campaign, an injury crisis saw him make his Super Rugby debut as a second-half replacement against the Western Force on 5 April 2014. It was to prove an unhappy debut as his side went down to 32-29 defeat and he himself had to be substituted with a chest injury following a heavy collision with Force fullback Jayden Hayward. He is currently playing for Wests Scarborough in the RugbyWA Premier Grade.

== International ==
Placid played a starring role for the Australian Schoolboys during their successful 2012 season. This included playing a part in his team´s historic victory away to New Zealand, only the second time they´d ever won on the other side of the Tasman. As a reward he was selected for the Australia Under-20 side which competed in the 2013 IRB Junior World Championship in France.

== Super Rugby statistics ==
As of 14 September 2017

Season	Team	Games	Starts	Sub	Mins	Tries	Cons	Pens	Drops	Points	Yel	Red
2014	Reds	1	0	1	6	0	0	0	0	0	0	0
2015	Rebels	1	1	0	80	1	0	0	0	5	0	0
2016	Rebels	12	7	5	697	4	0	0	0	20	0	0
2017	Rebels	5	2	3	204	2	0	0	0	10	0	0
Total		19	10	9	987	7	0	0	0	35	0	0
