= Carlo Tizzano =

Australian rugby union player (born 2000)

- Full name: Carlo Francesco Leonardo Tizzano
- Born: 2 February 2000 (age 26) Perth, Western Australia, Australia
- Height: 1.80 m (5 ft 11 in)
- Weight: 101 kg (223 lb; 15 st 13 lb)
- School: Hale School; Trinity College, Perth

Rugby union career
- Position: Flanker
- Current team: Western Force
Youth career
- –2019: RugbyWA Academy
Amateur team(s)
Years	Team	Apps	(Points)
2017–	UWA Rugby	31	(115)
2020–2022	West Harbour	10	(15)
- Correct as of 2024
Senior career
Years	Team	Apps	(Points)
2019	Western Force	8	(15)
2020–2022	Waratahs	18	(5)
2022–2023	Ealing Trailfinders	14	(75)
2023–	Western Force	43	(150)
- Correct as of 30 May 2026
International career
Years	Team	Apps	(Points)
2017–2018	Australian Schoolboys	2	(5)
2019	Australia U20	7	(5)
2024–	Australia	18	(20)
- Correct as of 17 October 2026
Medal record
Men's rugby union
Representing Australia
Oceania U20 Championship
Winner	2019 Gold Coast
Junior World Cup
Runner-up	2019 Argentina

Carlo Francesco Leonardo Tizzano (Italian pronunciation: [kˈarlo tit͡sːˈaːno]; born 2 February 2000) is an Australian professional rugby union player who currently plays as a flanker for Super Rugby club Western Force and the Australia national team.

== Youth career and personal life ==
Tizzano was born and raised in Perth in the Australian state of Western Australia to Italian parents. Tizzano's father migrated to Australia from Naples, Italy when he was 21-years-old, while his mother grew up in Perth and is of Italian descent. Tizzano's family comes from Ischia, Campania, Italy.

Tizzano played rugby union and Australian rules football in his youth, being selected for state teams in both sports. He has mentioned that his role in Australian rules football was a tagger. Tizzano also attended the Hale School and Trinity College, Perth. In 2020, speaking to The Daily Telegraph, Tizzano proclaimed, "I was an AFL player and I am a massive AFL fan, but I got sick and tired of players running away from me and not into me. I do love the contact. I really love it. I don't worry about getting hurt. This may sound a bit primate, but I like to have a battle and see who comes out top dog." Speaking on the Scrumbags Rugby Podcast in January 2025, Tizzano stated that in his youth his main playing positions were centre, wing and fullback, and that he didn't play as a flanker permanently until 2017. On the same podcast Tizzano credited the "orientation day"-style pathway presentation he received for rugby state try-outs in his teenage years as what 'got him over the line' in deciding between which sport to pursue professionally.

By 2017, Tizzano, then playing with the RugbyWA Academy and the University of Western Australia (UWA) in Perth's Premier Rugby competition, had been selected for the Australian Schoolboys team. However a week before the team's scheduled tour he suffered a knee injury and was subsequently ruled out.

In 2018, Tizzano made two appearances for the Australian Schoolboys on their tour of Great Britain and Ireland, scoring a try against Scotland U19s in a 46–14 win. Tizzano was also a member of the Australian under-20s squad to lift the Oceania U20 Championship title for the first time, playing in all three of their matches, including the 24–0 final win over New Zealand.

In 2025 Tizzano revealed that he was diagnosed with attention deficit hyperactivity disorder (ADHD) as an adult, having sought treatment in 2023.

Tizzano is a fan of combat sports, particularly boxing, mixed-martial arts, and wrestling.

== Career ==
In 2019, Tizzano made his professional debut with the Western Force in the Global Rapid Rugby. Starting at openside flanker in the team's 42–10 victory against the Asia Pacific Dragons, Tizzano scored a try in the tenth minute. Tizzano played seven games with the Western Force in their 2019 National Rugby Championship (NRC) campaign, scoring two tries in the process en route to the title. The Western Force defeated the Canberra Vikings 41–3 in the Final.

=== Waratahs ===
In September 2019, Tizzano was confirmed to join the Waratahs from the Force on a two-year deal beginning the following season (2020), alongside Michael McDonald and Andrew Deegan.

Tizzano was named in the Waratahs' senior squad ahead of the season, and later made his debut in their opening round match against the Crusaders. This was Tizzano's only minutes of the season for the Waratahs, as the season was later cut short due to the COVID-19 pandemic. He was released at the conclusion of the Super Rugby season and made his Shute Shield debut for the West Harbour Pirates in July 2020, where his impressive physicality and fitness were noted.

In 2021, Tizzano emerged as one of the Waratahs' standout loose forwards. In a mid-season interview with The Sydney Morning Herald he spoke of his motivation in joining the team the previous year and his goal of earning the No. 7 position ahead of Wallabies captain Michael Hooper, stating: "Literally the only reason I came here [New South Wales] is because I wanted to take his spot," adding, "I could have stayed at home, been comfortable... but I genuinely thought to myself I could have taken his spot last year. It's obviously shooting for the stars and that's never going to happen, but if I have that mindset, even if I don't do it, I'm going to get somewhere close."

Tizzano began the 2021 Super Rugby AU season as the starting Waratahs No. 7, playing a total of 600 minutes across eight matches. After the opening three rounds, Tizzano had made 64 tackles, 18 more than the second-highest player. By the season's end, he had the most tackles in the competition, and the second-most carries. Having started in every round of the Super Rugby AU, Tizzano was moved to the bench for the Waratahs' opening match of the Super Rugby Trans-Tasman against the Hurricanes. Despite a breakthrough debut season for the Waratahs, the team finished the year without a win, recording a 0–13 campaign across the Super Rugby AU, and Super Rugby Trans-Tasman, the first Australian team in the competition to achieve this feat.

In 2022, Tizzano was largely made a replacement for flanker Charlie Gamble, whom had a breakout season with the Waratahs in the back row. Tizzano played in just five matches during the season, and averaged no more than 27 minutes a match.

=== Ealing Trailfinders ===
In May 2022, Tizzano was confirmed as one of the Ealing Trailfinders's latest signings ahead of the 2022–23 Championship season. At the time of his transfer, Ealing were the defending Championship winners, having won the title on the final matchday. Ealing's Director of Rugby Ben Ward spoke highly of Tizzano upon his signing, stating: "We are very pleased to sign a player of Carlo's quality. He's an excellent young player, adds power and experience to our back-row and will become a crucial member of our squad. He has proven playing experience in Australia and we're excited to watch him develop even further."

Tizzano scored his first try for the club in their opening match against the Doncaster Knights in September 2022. Coming off the bench in the 53rd minute, Tizzano scored an 80th minute try to seal the bonus-point victory for the team. By October, Tizzano scored his first double and became the team's top try-scorer. By December, Tizzano had scored eleven tries as Ealing remained undefeated after nine rounds. At the end of the season, Tizzano had scored 15 tries in 14 matches for the club, the joint top try-scorer in the competition. Ealing finished runners-up, being two points off the Jersey Reds whom finished as champions.

=== Force ===
With the 2023 Super Rugby season already underway, the Force announced the return of Tizzano on a two-year deal in April of that year. It was later revealed 1 year and 110 days later that Tizzano had a meeting with newly-appointed Force coach Simon Cron on Christmas Eve in 2022 (while at Ealing) in an attempt to convince him to move back to the Force.

Tizzano played his first match in round ten against domestic rivals, the Queensland Reds. He later played every remaining match of the season for the Force, scoring two tries.

In 2024, Tizzano started in every match of the Force's season. After just three rounds, Tizzano was leading successful tackles in the Force squad, and was the competition leader in arrivals at the ruck (58). By round twelve, although the Force had won just two games, Tizzano had scored three tries, one of which sealed a bonus-point win against the Crusaders to end a ten-year drought, and was the competition leader in successful tackles (171). At the conclusion of the season, Tizzano had scored a further two tries and finished the competition leader in tackles with 240. In addition to tackling, Tizzano was also among the top ranks in the competition for tackle success rate and turnovers. Such was Tizzano's successful domestic season that he earnt a Wallabies call-up, making his Test debut in August 2024.

Continuing his outstanding form into 2025, Tizzano finished 2025 as the competition's leading try scorer with 13 tries, the most in Super Rugby season by a forward. He became the first Western Force player to be named Rugby Australia's Super Rugby Pacific Player of the Year, while also receiving consecutive club MVP honours for a second year in a row. At international level, Tizzano built on his Wallabies debut from the previous year, becoming a regular member of Australia's matchday squad throughout the Rugby Championship.

== International career ==
Tizzano was chosen to represent Australia at the 2019 World Rugby Under 20 Championship, making his first international appearance against Italy.

On 10 August 2024, Tizzano made his Wallabies debut in a 2024 Rugby Championship match against South Africa at Suncorp Stadium in Brisbane. The Wallabies suffered a heavy defeat of 33-7 to start their Rugby Championship campaign as South Africa scored 5 tries to 1.

Tizzano was involved in a controversial incident during the final moments of Australia’s defeat in the second test of the 2025 British & Irish Lions tour to Australia. Moments before the Lions would score the match-winning try, while counter-rucking near his own try line, Tizzano was cleared-out by Lions player Jac Morgan. Although the clear out was legal, with no contact being made with Tizzano’s head or neck, the Australian flanker appeared to feign a head injury in an apparent attempt to secure his side a match-winning penalty. However, after TMO review, it was correctly deemed that there had been no foul play and that Morgan’s actions were legal. Australia coach Joe Schmidt stated in Tizzano's defence that "-there were just over 54Gs of force, direct force that went through the neck, along with almost 2200 rads of rotational force." Schmidt’s claim remains disputed and no evidence was provided to support his assertion. Tizzano was criticised throughout the rugby community for his reaction to the contact, with many observers labelling Tizzano’s actions as unsportsmanlike.

== Career statistics ==
=== Club ===
As of 30 May 2026.

Statistics by club, season and competition
Club	Season	League			
Club	Season	Division	Apps	Tries	Points
Force	2019	Global Rapid Rugby, National Rugby Championship	8	3	15
Waratahs	2020	Super Rugby	1	0	0
Waratahs	2021	Super Rugby AU, Trans-Tasman	12	1	5
Waratahs	2022	Super Rugby Pacific	5	0	0
Waratahs	Total		18	1	5
Ealing Trailfinders	2022–23	Championship	14	15	75
Force	2023	Super Rugby Pacific	6	2	10
Force	2024	Super Rugby Pacific	14	5	25
Force	2025	Super Rugby Pacific	11	13	65
Force	2026	Super Rugby Pacific	12	10	50
Force	Total		43	30	150
Career total			83	49	245

=== International ===
As of 30 May 2026.

Statistics by team and year
Team	Year	Statistic		
Team	Year	Apps	Tries	Points
Australia	2024	5	1	5
Australia	2025	9	3	15
Total		14	4	20

=== International tries ===
List of international tries scored by Carlo Tizzano
No.	Opponent	Location	Competition	Date	Result	Ref.
1	Argentina	Estadio Brigadier General Estanislao López, Santa Fe	2024 Rugby Championship	7 September 2024	27–67	
2	British & Irish Lions	Lang Park, Brisbane	2025 British & Irish Lions tour of Australia	19 July 2025	19–27	
3	New Zealand	Eden Park, Auckland	2025 Rugby Championship	27 September 2025	24–33	
4	Japan	Japan National Stadium, Tokyo	2025 Autumn International	25 October 2025	19–15	

== Awards and honours ==
Force

- National Rugby Championship: 2019

Australia U20

- Oceania U20 Championship: 2019

Individual

- Australian Super Rugby Pacific Player of the Year: 2025
- Super Rugby Pacific Team of the Year: 2025 (honorary)
- RugbyWA Premier Grade Best & Fairest: 2017
