= Wests Scarborough Rugby Union Football Club =

Western Australia rugby union club

Wests Scarborough RUFC
- Full name: Wests Scarborough Rugby Union Football Club
- Unions: Australian Rugby Union
- Union: RugbyWA
- Nickname: Wests
- Emblem: Heraldic Boar
- Founded: 1930
- Disbanded: 1939 - 1956
- Location: Doubleview, Western Australia
- Ground: Bennett Park
- President: Chris Burch
- Coach: Scott Batters
- League: RugbyWA Premier Grade
Team kit

Official website
- www.westsscarboroughrugby.com.au

Wests Scarborough Rugby Union Football Club, often shortened to Wests Scarborough or just "Wests", is a rugby union club based in Doubleview, Scarborough, Perth, Western Australia. They have several teams competing in RugbyWA competitions and have one side playing in the RugbyWA Premier Grade.

The club, established in 1930 and reformed in 1950, trains and plays at Bennett Park in Doubleview. The club has a newly renovated clubhouse, with a kitchen, licensed bar and changing facilities, overlooking the two rugby pitches.

== History ==
The club was formed in 1930 as the Western Suburbs Rugby Union Club, winning its first premiership in 1932. The club folded during World War II but was reformed in 1950. From 1970 to 1974 four consecutive premierships were captured by the club, during these years members of the club were selected to play for Australia. From the 1970s onwards Wests started their first juniors (schoolboy) teams to capture young talent.

The club was renamed Wests Subiaco in 2000, and the quality of play within the club greatly improved during this period, based at Rosalie Park. Wests saw 5 teams make the finals in 2002 with the premier team winning the minor premiership. In 2003 first grade won both the minor and major premiership flags. Wests became the dominant club in premier grade competition in the early to late 2000's. The club moved north to Bennett Park in 2013 after a dispute with the Subiaco Soccer Club, and took on the Wests Scarborough name.

== Honours ==
- Premier Grade (12)

1932, 1971, 1974, 1975, 1976, 1977, 2003, 2004, 2005, 2006, 2016, 2017, 2022

== Notable players ==
- John Welborn - Western Suburbs, UWA, Western Australia, Australia.

== See also ==
- RugbyWA
- City of Stirling
- Perth
- Rugby Union in Western Australia
- Rugby Union in Australia

== Sources ==
- Hays, Kevin (30 January 2010). "Sponsor Document" (PDF). Wests Scarborough. Archived from the original on 26 March 2018.
