= Lionel Gouly =

Australian cricketer

Personal information
- Born: 12 February 1873; Woolloomooloo, Australia
- Died: 15 April 1911 (aged 38); Perth, Australia
- Source: Cricinfo, 13 July 2017

Lionel Gouly (12 February 1873 – 15 April 1911) was an Australian cricketer. He played four first-class matches for Western Australia from 1905/06 till 1907/08. He was also secretary of the Karrakatta Cricket Club.

Gouly was also an organiser of rugby union in Western Australia, playing for and captaining the Swan Rugby Club in Perth, and as Secretary of the WARU.

He served with the 3rd Western Australian (Bushmen) Contingent, a mounted military unit raised during the Second Boer War.

Gouly passed away due to cancer in April 1911.

== See also ==
- List of Western Australia first-class cricketers
