= Football in Western Australia =

There are numerous codes of Football in Western Australia.

The code most commonly referred to as football in Western Australia is Australian rules football, but other codes are also known as football on a national and international basis:

- Australian rules football in Western Australia
- Football (soccer) in Western Australia
- Rugby union in Western Australia
- Rugby league in Western Australia
