= Jermaine Ainsley =

Australian rugby union player (born 1995)

- Born: 8 August 1995 (age 31) Cromwell, New Zealand
- Height: 181 cm (5 ft 11 in)
- Weight: 125 kg (19 st 10 lb; 276 lb)
- School: Otago Boys' High School

Rugby union career
- Position: Prop
- Current team: Otago, Highlanders
Senior career
Years	Team	Apps	(Points)
2015–2017	Perth Spirit	16	(5)
2016–2017	Force	17	(0)
2018–2020	Rebels	43	(0)
2018–2019	Melbourne Rising	10	(0)
2021–	Otago	7	(0)
2022–	Highlanders	13	(0)
- Correct as of 16 July 2022
International career
Years	Team	Apps	(Points)
2018	Australia	3	(0)
2022	Māori All Blacks	1	(0)
- Correct as of 16 July 2022

Jermaine Ainsley (born 8 August 1995) is a New Zealand professional rugby union footballer who currently plays as a prop for the Highlanders in the Super Rugby competition after previously being with the Rebels.

== Early life ==
Born and raised in New Zealand, Ainsley moved to Western Australia in search of his big break in the game. He represented Western Australia at under-20 level before turning out for the Force's A team. He played an important role in the Nedlands club's victory in the Pindan RugbyWA Premier Grade (1st Grade) competition in 2015.

== Rugby career ==
Ainsley was selected by the Perth Spirit for the 2015 National Rugby Championship season. He played in nine matches in total for the Spirit in 2015, starting two of them and this secured him a spot in the Western Force's wider training group ahead of the 2016 Super Rugby season.

Injuries to props Tetera Faulkner and Francois van Wyk gave Ainsley the opportunity to earn valuable game time during his debut campaign. He earned his first cap in Round 1 against the Melbourne Rebels and played in nine of the Force's fifteen matches that year, one of which was as a starter. This form earned him a new 2-year contract to keep him at the Force until 2018.

After the Force were excluded from the Super rugby competition, Ainsley moved to join the Melbourne Rebels in 2018 and, later that year, signed an extended deal with the club to stay in Melbourne through to 2020.

== Super Rugby statistics ==
As of 12 September 2020

Season	Team	Games	Start	Sub	Mins	T	C	PG	DG	Pts	YC	RC
2016	Force	9	1	8	155	0	0	0	0	0	0	0
2017	Force	8	7	1	406	0	0	0	0	0	0	0
2018	Rebels	15	9	6	664	0	0	0	0	0	0	0
2019	Rebels	15	8	7	609	0	0	0	0	0	0	0
2020	Rebels	5	4	1	265	0	0	0	0	0	0	0
2020 AU	Rebels	8	5	3	429	0	0	0	0	0	0	0
Total		60	34	26	2537	0	0	0	0	0	0	0

== Personal life ==
Ainsley is a New Zealander of Māori descent (Te Rarawa and Te Arawa descent).
