= Richard Hardwick =

Namibian rugby union player (born 1994)

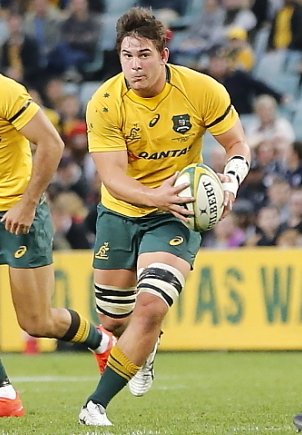
- Hardwick with Australia in 2017
- Born: 31 May 1994 (age 32) Windhoek, Namibia
- Height: 1.83 m (6 ft 0 in)
- Weight: 102 kg (16 st 1 lb; 225 lb)
- School: Churchlands Senior High School

Rugby union career
- Position: Loose forward
- Current team: Grenoble
Amateur team(s)
Years	Team	Apps	(Points)
2011−2016	UWA Rugby Club	93	(45)
Senior career
Years	Team	Apps	(Points)
2014–2017	Perth Spirit	27	(30)
2016−2017	Force	19	(10)
2018–2023	Rebels	67	(40)
2018–2019	Melbourne Rising	11	(15)
2023–2024	Ealing Trailfinders	16	(30)
2024–	Grenoble	33	(20)
- Correct as of 15 May 2026
International career
Years	Team	Apps	(Points)
2011	Australia A Schools		
2017	Australia	2	(0)
2022–	Namibia	7	(0)
- Correct as of 24 October 2023

Richard Hardwick (born 31 May 1994) is a Namibian professional rugby union player who plays as a loose forward for Pro D2 club Grenoble and the Namibia national team. He previously played for the Western Force and the Melbourne Rebels in the Super Rugby, while he played for Perth Spirit and Melbourne Rising in the National Rugby Championship (NRC), as well as the Australia national team in 2017.

== Early life ==
Hardwick was born in Namibia, but raised in Western Australia. He attended Churchlands Senior High School in Perth and was selected for the Australia 'A' Schoolboys team in 2011. Hardwick earned his stripes playing for University of Western Australia in the local Premier Grade (1st Grade) competition. He previously played in the Juniors for UWA. In addition he spent two years with the Future Force squad preparing to become a Super Rugby player.

== Career ==
Named as a member of the Force's wider training group ahead of the 2016 Super Rugby season, Hardwick didn't have to wait long for his debut, arriving as it did in a match away to the Highlanders at the end of March. He made two starts and two substitute appearances during the season.

Hardwick won the Phil Waugh Medal in the grand final of the 2016 National Rugby Championship for his man of the match performance on the way to Perth Spirit's first NRC title win.

In late 2017 Hardwick signed with the Rebels, along with fellow Wallabies teammates, Bill Meakes and Matt Philip. Hardwick signed a two-year deal which will take him through the 2019 World Cup.

== Super Rugby statistics ==
As of 3 June 2023

Season	Team	Games	Starts	Sub	Mins	Tries	Cons	Pens	Drops	Points	Yel	Red
2016	Force	4	2	2	193	0	0	0	0	0	0	0
2017	Force	15	7	8	757	2	0	0	0	10	1	0
2018	Rebels	8	1	7	207	0	0	0	0	0	0	0
2019	Rebels	12	8	4	634	0	0	0	0	0	0	0
2020	Rebels	6	4	2	286	1	0	0	0	5	0	0
2020 AU	Rebels	9	6	3	511	0	0	0	0	0	0	0
2021 AU	Rebels	8	7	1	521	0	0	0	0	0	0	0
2021 TT	Rebels	5	3	2	225	0	0	0	0	0	0	0
2022	Rebels	10	6	4	489	2	0	0	0	10	0	0
2023	Rebels	9	9	0	651	5	0	0	0	25	0	0
Total		86	53	35	4,474	10	0	0	0	50	1	0
