= Rugby union in Australia =

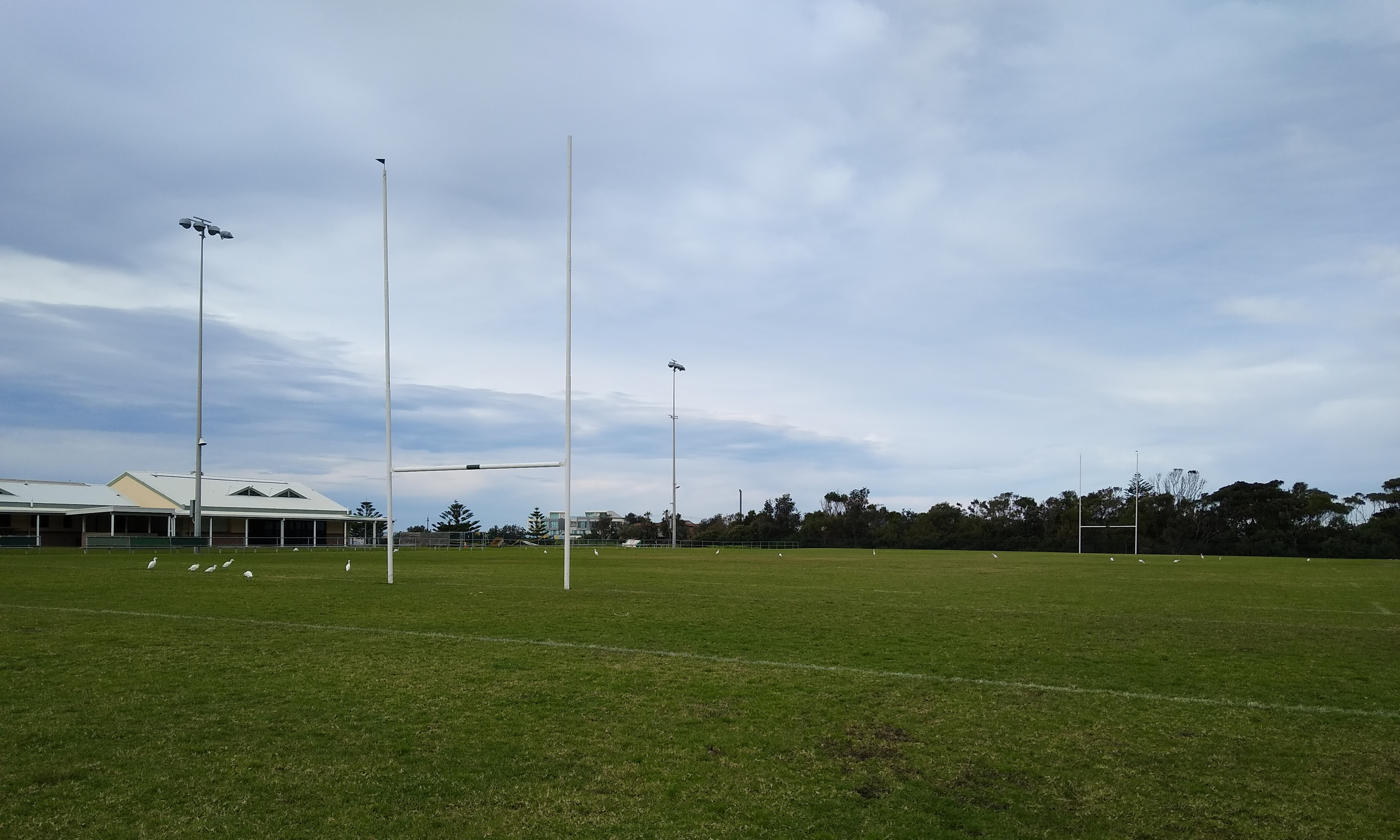
- A rugby union pitch in Woonona, New South Wales.
- Country: Australia
- Governing body: Rugby Australia
- National team: Australia
- Nickname: Wallabies
- First played: 18 June 1870 Sydney, New South Wales
- Registered players: 85,059 (Club XV); 32,119 (Club 7s); 12,067 (Touch 7s); ~60,000 (School XV & 7s); 56,150 (Sporting Schools Program/Get Into Rugby)
- Clubs: 770

Club competitions
- Super Rugby; Super W; Shute Shield; Queensland Premier Rugby; ACTRU Premier Division; RugbyWA Premier Grade

International competitions
- Rugby World Cup; Women's Rugby World Cup; The Rugby Championship; Rugby World Cup Sevens; World Rugby Sevens Series; World Rugby Women's Sevens Series; Sydney Sevens

Audience records
- Single match: 109,874; Australia v New Zealand, (Telstra Stadium); 15 July 2000

Rugby union (rugby) in Australia has a history of organised competition dating back to the early 1870s in Sydney with the first clubs Sydney University FC and Wallaroo FC. The New South Wales Rugby Union was founded in 1874, modeled on England's Rugby Football Union. Although traditionally most popular in Australia's rugby football strongholds of New South Wales, Queensland and the ACT, the sport is played throughout the nation.

The principal provincial competition in Australian rugby is Super Rugby, which is a multi-national competition across the South Pacific. Australia enters four teams: the Reds of Queensland, the Waratahs of New South Wales, the Brumbies of the Australian Capital Territory and the Western Force of Western Australia.

Currently there is no nationwide domestic club competition for rugby union in Australia following the disbandment of the National Rugby Championship in 2020. Competitions below the level of Super Rugby are traditional capital city competitions, such as the Shute Shield of Sydney, Queensland Premier Rugby of Brisbane, the ACTRU Premier Division in Canberra, and Perth's RugbyWA Premier Grade. These city-based club competitions have traditionally formed the highest level of domestic competition for the sport in Australia.

The national governing body of Rugby Australia launched a new top-level women's 15s competition known as Super W in 2018 featuring five clubs branded as state/territorial teams—the ACT, New South Wales, Queensland, Victoria and Western Australia.

The men's national team are the Wallabies, who have won the Rugby World Cup twice, in 1991 and in 1999. The women's national team are the Wallaroos achieving a best result of third place in 2010 during the Women's Rugby World Cup.

Rugby union holds the match attendance record of any football code in New South Wales (109,874), Western Australia (61,241) and the Australian Capital Territory (28,753).

Australia has also achieved success in numerous Rugby Sevens tournaments with the women's sevens team winning the Rugby World Cup Sevens once in 2009, winning gold at the 2016 Olympics, and winning the World Rugby Women's Sevens Series three times. While the men's sevens team has been runners-up twice in the Rugby World Cup Sevens.

== History ==
=== 19th century ===
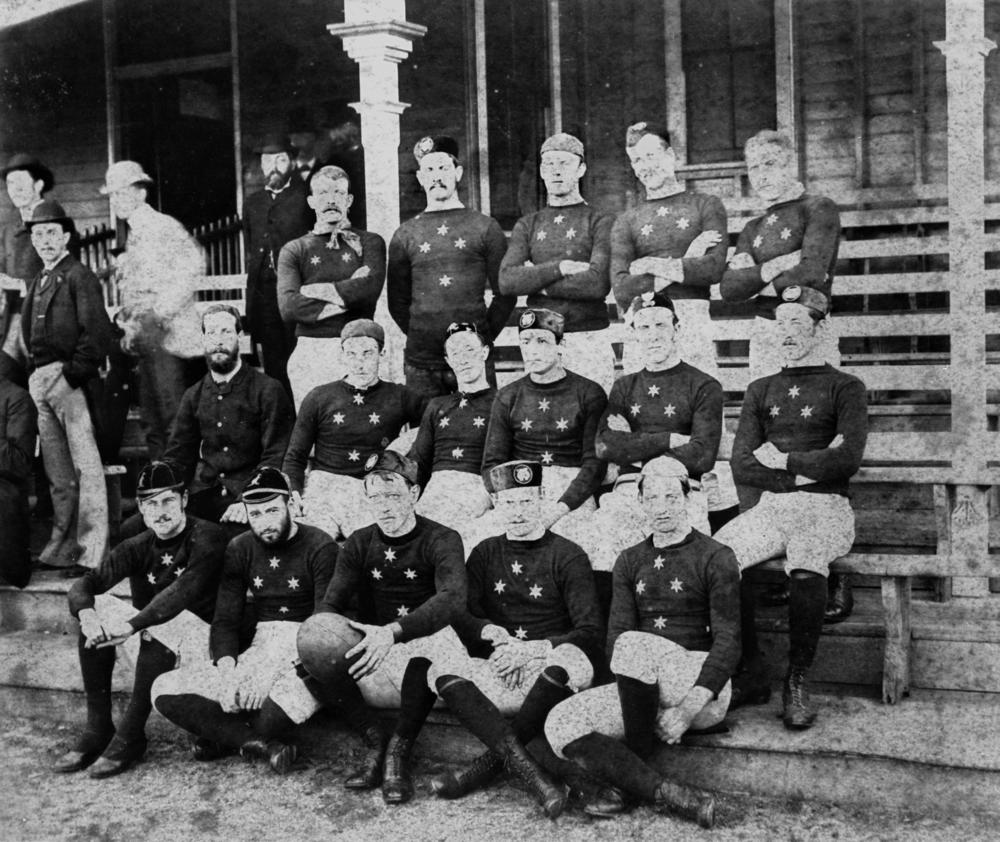
The NSW team, 1883.

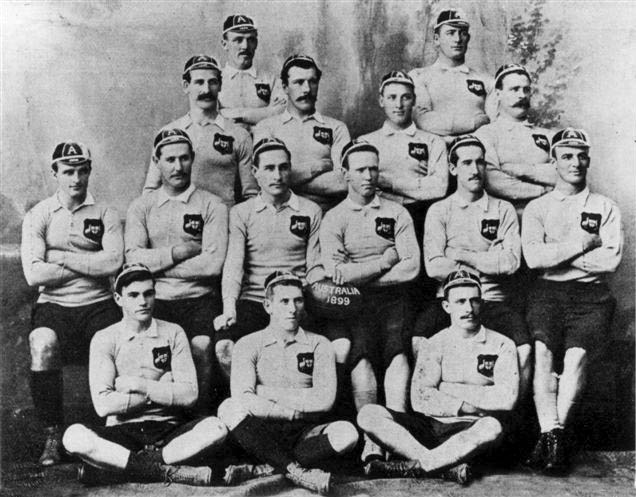
The Australia national team in 1899.

The first two appearances in Australia of football played per the rules of Rugby School do not have any continuing linkage to the development of the code. The first was in Van Diemen's Land (Tasmania) at Christ College in Bishopsbourne in 1847-49, however the College then closed. In Melbourne in the Colony of Victoria, in 1858 rugby football, popularised by cricketer Tom Wills, who had attended Rugby School, and the novel Tom Brown's School Days, was played by South Yarra FC, teams (of cricket clubs) and schools. Concerns about the number and complexity of the laws of rugby football, as well as risk of injury, led to the Melbourne FC in May 1859 devising its own football rules, which in time became Australian rules football.

In Sydney football of unknown rules had been played over the last half of the 1860s by students at Sydney University, short-lived clubs and military sides. Players familiar with the rugby game from the Sydney schools, along with increased arrivals from England and elsewhere, soon led to organised club rugby football commencing in Sydney after the formation of the Wallaroo FC in 1870. The club's first rules famously included at Rule XXIII a provision which prohibited the "throttling or strangling" of opponents. The first recorded game played under rugby rules was held in Sydney on 18 June 1870 between Wallaroo FC and a British 'Army & Navy' team.On 23 June 1871 a meeting was held at the Metropolitan Hotel to formally establish the Sydney University FC who today are Australia's oldest rugby union club.

In 1874 the Wallaroo FC led the formation of a body to oversee agreed rugby rules for the clubs called the Southern Rugby Football Union (now the NSWRU). The other clubs present with Wallaroo at the founding meeting were Goulburn, Waratah, Balmain, St. Leonards, The King’s School, Camden College and Newington College. This was the first such governing body formed anywhere in the world after England and Scotland. In the oldest remaining rivalry game in Australian rugby union, The King's School and Newington still play each other annually via the AAGPS (NSW) Rugby competition.Growth in new clubs continued at a pace from the mid-1870s onwards, in both Sydney, Brisbane and NSW regional centres alike.

The first intercolonial football match in Australia under any code occurred on 23 June 1877 resultant of the 'Waratah' FC inviting Australian rules football club, the Carlton Football Club, to Sydney to play two matches, one under rugby rules and one under Australian rules. On Saturday 23 June 1877, 3,000 spectators watched Waratah beat Carlton at rugby at the Albert Cricket Ground in Redfern. In the return leg, Carlton defeated Waratah under Australian rules. The two clubs met again in 1878 in Melbourne.

In 1877 the Sydney University FC unsuccessfully attempted to have the Southern Rugby Football Union and its members clubs swap codes to Australian rules football.The initiative fueled interest in the rival code, culminating in 1880 in the formation of New South Wales Football Association (now AFL) and clubs in Sydney. Prominent southern Melbourne football clubs including Albert Park and South Melbourne strongly advocated for rugby rules throughout the 1860s and 1870s, however this did not meet favour with the more powerful clubs in the colony.

The earliest record of rugby games and formation of rugby clubs in the Colony of Queensland was in Brisbane in 1876. The first of annual inter-colonial rugby games between NSW (now Waratahs) and Queensland (now Reds) occurred on 12 August 1882, when rugby players from the four Queensland Football Association (now AFL) clubs travelled to Sydney. NSW won by 28 points to 4 at the Association Ground (later to be renamed the Sydney Cricket Ground) in front of 4,000 spectators. Later that same year, the Southern Rugby Union undertook its inaugural tour of New Zealand, winning four of its seven matches.

On 2 November, in 1883, the Northern Rugby Union (now QRU) was formed as the rugby body in Queensland after a meeting at the Exchange Hotel. As a result of the formation of the new body, several prominent grammar schools took up rugby as opposed to Melbourne Rules. The following year, a New Zealand party went to Australia and the first club competition was held in Queensland. In 1888 the Melbourne Rugby Union was formed in Victoria. That year the first British and Irish Lions tour was carried out. Although unsanctioned by official bodies in Europe, the 21-man squad went to both Australia and New Zealand. In 1892, the rugby bodies in Australia dropped Southern and Northern from their titles, adopting New South Wales and Queensland respectively.

In 1893, Frank Ivory was the first Indigenous Australian to play representative rugby union when he was chosen for Queensland.

In 1899, the national team of Australia (now Wallabies) played their first match, and the Hospital's Cup became an annual competition in Queensland.

=== 1900s to 1940s ===
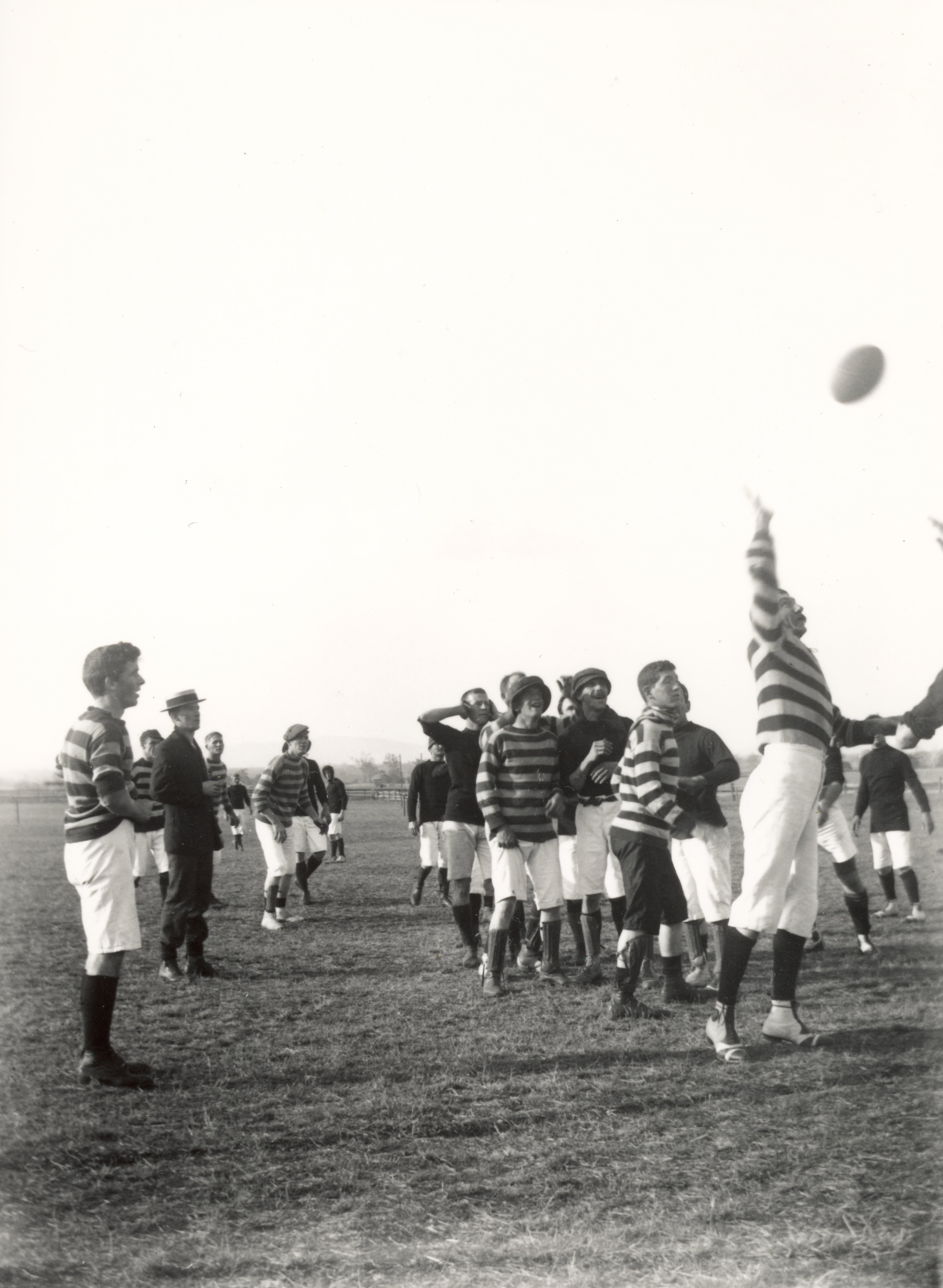
A rugby game in Queensland during the early 1900s.

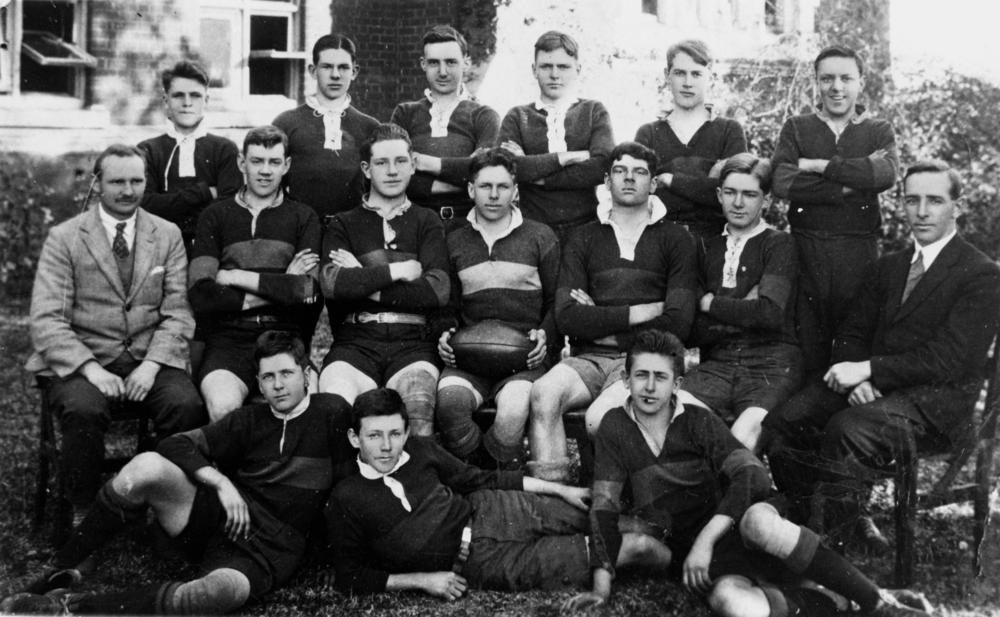
Toowoomba Grammar School Rugby Union Team, 1927.

Australia played its first test against New Zealand in 1903 in front of a crowd of 30,000 at the Sydney Cricket Ground. In 1907, Australia again played New Zealand, at the same venue as the 1903 match, with crowd numbers reaching 50,000. This figure would not be surpassed again in Australian rugby union until after the game turned professional.

The British Isles team visited Australia in 1904 and 1908, and at the 1908 Summer Olympics, the Australian team defeated England to win the gold medal in rugby. That same year, the New South Wales Rugby League broke away from the NSWRU, with the Queensland Rugby League following suit from the QRU in 1909.

An event that was to greatly shape rugby union's future in Australia was the onset of World War I in 1914. Rugby competitions were suspended due to an overwhelmingly high percentage of rugby players enlisting to serve in the Australian Imperial Force.

The NSWRU also established the Rugby Union Rifle Club in Sydney in 1915, an organisation to assist in the training of the rugby men (current and retired) in military skills and physical fitness, to aid and encourage enlistment and local protection roles. This involved each of the first grade rugby clubs forming their own rifle club arm, including Eastern Suburbs Rugby Union Rifle Club, Northern Suburbs and Sydney University. The rugby men trained in marksmanship, drill and bayonet work, often combined with inter-club competitions, as well as rugby matches. Similar clubs were formed in the major centres of NSW and Queensland that had rugby union clubs. Such was its success, the movement fell away as most participants had enlisted. A Sydney newspaper reported: "According to figures prepared by Mr W. W. Hill, secretary of the NSWRU, 197 out of 220 regular first grade players are on active service, or 90 percent."

Weakened by the loss of its players to the war effort, the Queensland Rugby Union was dissolved in 1919. It was not until 1928 that the union was re-formed and the Brisbane clubs and Great Public Schools returned to playing the rugby union code.

In 1931, Charles Bathurst, 1st Viscount Bledisloe, as Governor of New Zealand, donated a sporting trophy called the Bledisloe Cup for competition between Australia and New Zealand. The first game was held that year at Eden Park, though the official start of the competition is disputed between that game and the 1932 New Zealand tour to Australia.

Until the late 1940s, the administration of the Australian team, including all tours, was handled by New South Wales, being the senior union. A national body, the Australian Rugby Football Union was formed at a conference in Sydney in 1945, acting initially in an advisory capacity only, and in 1949 was formally constituted and joined the International Rugby Football Board (IRFB), representing Australia.

Apparently Australian rugby union then existed in a state of suspended animation until the 1980s.

=== 1980s to present ===
In 1987, the first ever Rugby World Cup was held in both Australia and New Zealand, as a result of both the respective rugby bodies putting forth the idea to the IRB. Australia was defeated by France in the semifinal stage.

The 1991 Rugby World Cup took place in Europe, and saw Australia defeat England 12-6 in the Final, winning their first World Cup after having triumphed over their fierce rivals New Zealand in the semifinal.

With rugby union becoming an openly professional sport in 1995, after more than a century of a professed amateur status, major changes were seen in both the club and international game. The Super 12 rugby competition was born that year. The tournament involved 12 provincial sides from three countries; New Zealand, South Africa and Australia. Australia entered three sides into the competition; ACT Brumbies, Queensland Reds and the New South Wales Waratahs. The year also saw the first Tri Nations Series, between the three Super 12 countries.

In 1999, the Bledisloe Cup match between Australia and New Zealand was staged at the Homebush Olympic Stadium, now known as ANZ Stadium. The game attracted a then world record crowd for a rugby union match of 107,042 to see Australia win with its greatest margin over New Zealand by 28–7. In 2000 this record was raised again when a crowd of 109,874 witnessed the 'Greatest ever Rugby Match'. New Zealand took an early lead of 24-nil after 11 minutes only to see Australia draw level at 24 all by half time, and the match was decided by a Jonah Lomu try to finish in favour of New Zealand by 39–35.

The Wallabies were champions of the 1999 Rugby World Cup in Wales, claiming their second Webb Ellis Cup trophy. In doing this, Australia became the first team to win multiple world cups.

The year 2003 saw the staging of the Rugby World Cup in Australia. The fifth Rugby World Cup was held in various Australian cities from October to November in 2003. Matches were played all across the country, in Sydney, Brisbane, Melbourne, Canberra, Adelaide, Perth, Townsville, Gosford, Wollongong and Launceston. The tournament was hailed as a huge success, an estimated 40,000 international spectators travelled to Australia for the event, some estimations said that a $100 million may have been injected into the Australian economy. The Australian Rugby Union said that revenues exceeded all expectations, the tournament surplus was estimated to be at $44.5 million. The hosting of the World Cup in Australia also saw an increase in Super 12 crowds and junior participation. In 2005, to celebrate a decade of professional rugby union in Australia, the Wallaby Team of the Decade was announced.

== Popularity concerns ==
In recent years, rugby union’s popularity in Australia has failed to keep pace with that of its rival sporting codes, sparking fears that the sport is in decline. Competition from other winter sports, including soccer, Australian rules football and rugby league, has seen rugby union’s grassroots participation, television audience and match attendance fall dramatically in the past two decades. The success of the Matildas has helped soccer attract young women and girls in particular. The AFL and NRL have also made significant inroads into the sporting landscape of New South Wales - the state in which Rugby Union has historically been most popular. Unlike its rival leagues, almost all rugby union matches in Australia are broadcast on subscription-based streaming services, rather than free-to-air television, making the sport less accessible to prospective fans. Rugby union has also suffered from its perceived association with Australia’s upper class, as its professional teams continue to rely largely on elite private schools to supply talent and fans. Commentators widely regard Super Rugby, the tournament in which its domestic teams play, as moribund. Better competition and more lucrative contracts in Europe and Japan routinely siphon potential stars abroad.

Under these conditions the Wallabies, Australia’s national rugby union team, have underperformed, sinking to an historic low with a first-time early exit from the 2023 Rugby World Cup, and dropping to 9th in the World Rugby rankings. Despite this, the NRL and AFL's lack of viable overseas competition means that the Wallabies remain prestigious and popular, with international fixtures in Australia maintaining good match attendance and high television viewership. Australia will also host the 2027 Rugby World Cup which, depending partly on the Wallabies' performance, is expected to boost the sport’s popularity.

== Organisation ==
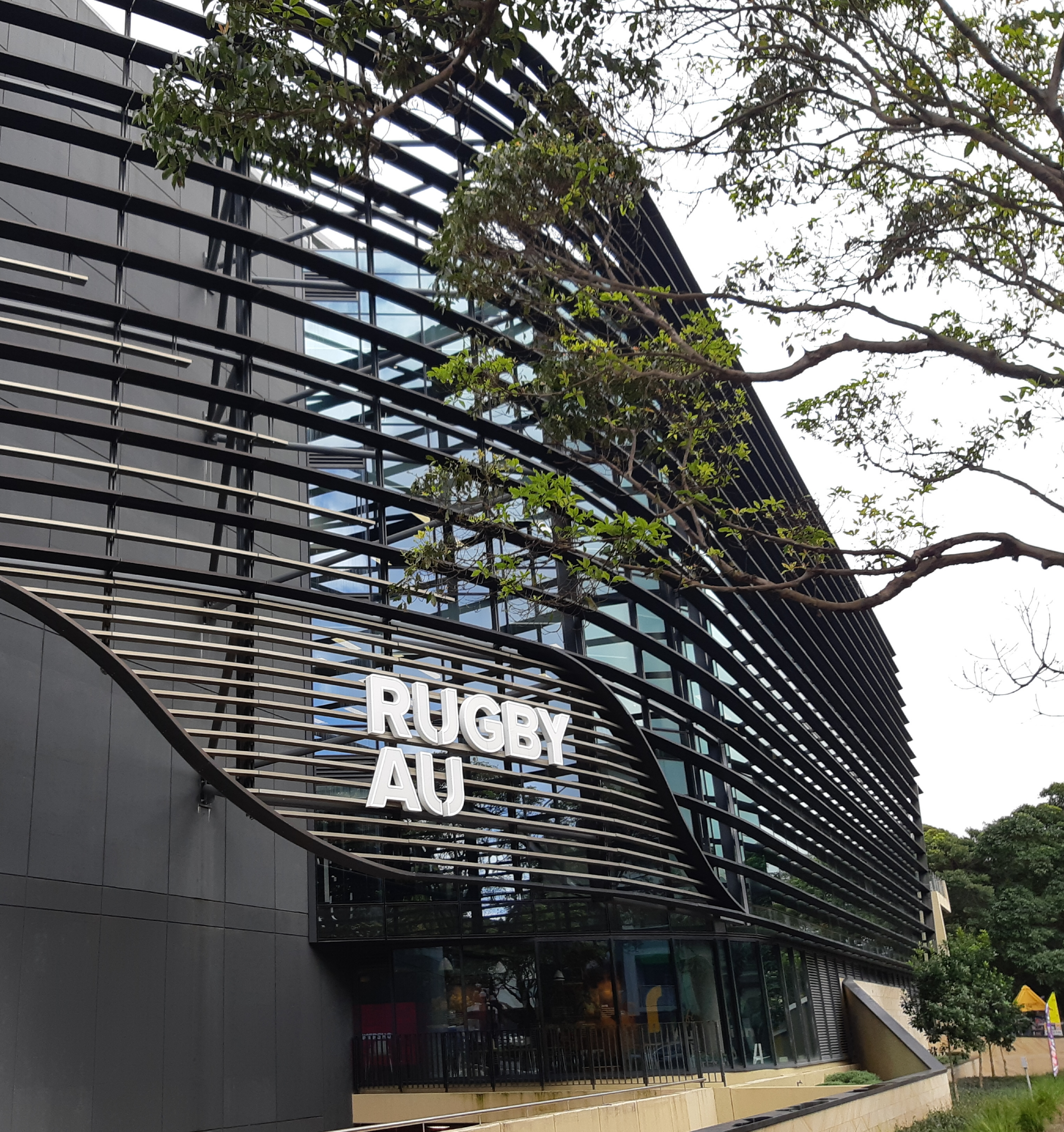
The Headquarters of Rugby Australia. Moore Park, Sydney

Rugby union in Australia is governed by Rugby Australia, which is a member of World Rugby (WR). There are constituent state and territory unions with the New South Wales Rugby Union and Queensland Rugby Union traditionally being the dominant members, reflecting the games higher status in these states. However, every state and territory in Australia is represented by their respective union, and in recent years, the ACT and Southern NSW Rugby Union has elevated itself to competitive equality with NSW and Queensland—though not in governance, as NSW and Queensland have more representatives on the ARU board than the other state and territorial unions. Rugby Australia was formed in 1949 as the Australian Rugby Union; before this time the NSWRU was responsible for international fixtures for Australian teams.

=== Rugby Union Players Association ===
Past and present professional Australian rugby players are represented by the Rugby Union Players Association.

== Participation ==
In 2000, figures from World Rugby (then the IRB) show there were just over 38,000 registered adult rugby union players in Australia, of which the states of New South Wales and Queensland accounted for 82.3% of all senior players. The highest participation rate was 0.8%, in the Australian Capital Territory.

The Rugby Au Annual Report 2019 records participation figures for club XV as 85,059 and club 7s as 32,119 resulting in a total club rugby participation figure of 117,178.

Rugby in Australia has enjoyed traditional support within inter-school competitions with the first school match being played by Newington College against Sydney University in 1869. Major rugby playing independent school sports associations include Great Public Schools Association of Queensland, Associated Southern Colleges, Athletic Association of the Great Public Schools of New South Wales, Combined Associated Schools and Independent Schools Association (Australia). The most renowned of these competitions in New South Wales being the GPS involving The King's School, St Ignatius' College, Riverview and St Joseph's College, Hunters Hill.

Whilst regularly positioned as an exclusively private school sport, 61% of schools delivering Rugby programs in 2018 were government schools. In a concerted effort to build game awareness and increase club participation opportunities, Rugby AU has engaged in a National Schools Strategy to grow school based XV participation (to link with local clubs) that saw five new XV competitions launched in 2019 alone for students attending 17 non-traditional Rugby schools. As at 2019, the total number of school students playing either XV or 7s rugby was almost 60,000.

Australian Schools representative sides have been selected since 1969 with that year's team having toured South Africa. The Australian Schools Rugby Union is an independent incorporated association run by volunteer members of the teaching profession and supporters who believe rugby has a unique ethos and benefits that contribute to the broader education of young people. The association first ran the Australian Schools Championship in 1975 and since then some 170 schools representatives have gone on to play for the Wallabies with countless more representing their State or playing professionally across the world.

The popularity of Rugby for women has been growing steadily in recent years following increased visibility of women's pathways and representative teams such as Buildcorp Wallaroos and national 7s teams. As at 2019, females account for approximately 27% of total playing participation.

Region/State/Territory	Registered players 2019	Registered players 2016	Registered players 2021-22	Registered players 2023-24	Registered players 2024-25
(New South Wales) National	117,118	141,545	139,100	70,015	75,330
New South Wales		57,490	58,940	35,043	32,255
(Victoria (state)) Victoria		9,243	12,135	6,514	6,271
Queensland		50,486	44,266	21,234	24,687
Western Australia		13,371	12,253	2,785	5,794
South Australia		5,384	3,793	972	2,641
Tasmania		1,499	1,598	318	828
Australian Capital Territory		2,086	3,120	2,754	1,908
Northern Territory		1,987	2,966	395	847

== National teams ==
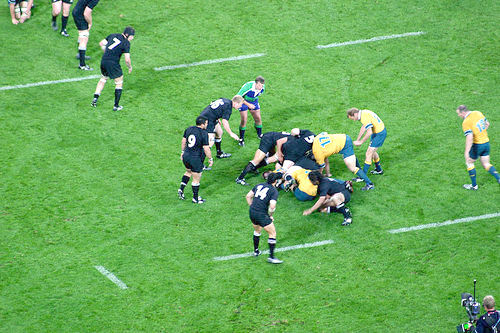
The Wallabies playing the New Zealand All Blacks

=== Wallabies ===
The Wallabies is Australia's national rugby union team. Australia has won the World Cup on two occasions, in 1991 against England in England, and then again in 1999 in Wales against France. The team plays in green and gold, which have traditionally been Australia's sporting colours. Australia has been playing internationals since 1899, when they played a visiting British Isles team on 24 June, defeating them by 13 points to 3.

The Wallabies play in the Southern Hemisphere's principal international competition. From 1996 through 2011, this was the Tri Nations, also involving the New Zealand All Blacks and the South Africa Springboks. Since 2012, the tournament has been renamed The Rugby Championship and features the Argentina Pumas.

The rivalry with the New Zealand All Blacks is considered the marquee rivalry for the game of Rugby in Australia and the teams contest the Bledisloe Cup on an annual basis. The biggest crowd for a Bledisloe match was 109,874 in Sydney.

In addition to participating in The Rugby Championship, the Wallabies host Northern Hemisphere sides in the "July Window" such as France, England, Ireland etc., and tour to the Northern Hemisphere in the "November Window". Whilst the July Window will usually see a series of test matches played against one foreign team such as the 2021 French three-test-tour, the end of year tours will generally see a number of one-off games against different national sides. End of year tour games above the three required by World Rugby can generate as much as $1.5 million in revenue for Rugby AU.

=== Wallaroos ===
The women's team, the Wallaroos have been playing international rugby since 1994, and have competed at four Women's Rugby World Cups. Their best finish was third in 2010.

=== Other representative teams ===
==== Australia A ====
Australia A is a team of players who are being developed as future Wallaby players. They play matches against touring teams as well as compete in the Pacific Nations Cup.

==== Sevens ====
Australia also has a successful sevens team which competes in the World Rugby Sevens Series, Rugby World Cup Sevens and the Commonwealth Games. They have won the Hong Kong Sevens event on five occasions, and are also a "core team" that participates in all rounds of the Sevens World Series.

The country has hosted one leg of the Sevens World Series in each season since 2006–07. From 2007 through 2011, the Adelaide Sevens was held in that city in March or April. Starting with the 2011–12 season, the Australian leg moved to the Gold Coast and was renamed the Gold Coast Sevens. In addition, the event moved to November, becoming the first tournament of each season. The tournament moved to October beginning in the 2012–13 season, but remained the season opener through 2014–15. Since the 2015–16 series, the event has been held in Sydney, and is now fourth on the series schedule.

==== Women's Sevens ====
The women's sevens team were champions of the inaugural Women's World Cup Sevens in 2009. They have also been a core team in the World Rugby Women's Sevens Series since its inaugural 2012–13 season, and won the gold medal for inaugural Olympic sevens tournament at Rio de Janeiro in 2016.

==== Age-level representation ====
Australia also has an under 21 side, an under 20 side, an under 19 side and a schoolboys team.

== Competitions, tournaments and tours ==
=== International tournaments ===
==== Rugby World Cup ====
Australia co-hosted the first Rugby World Cup, along with New Zealand in 1987. It acted as host for the second time in 2003. Australia has won twice, in 1991 and 1999.

==== Tri Nations and The Rugby Championship ====
The Tri Nations Series was an annual tournament held between Australia, New Zealand, and South Africa from 1996 through 2011. With Argentina's entry into the tournament in 2012, the competition has been renamed The Rugby Championship.

==== Bledisloe Cup ====
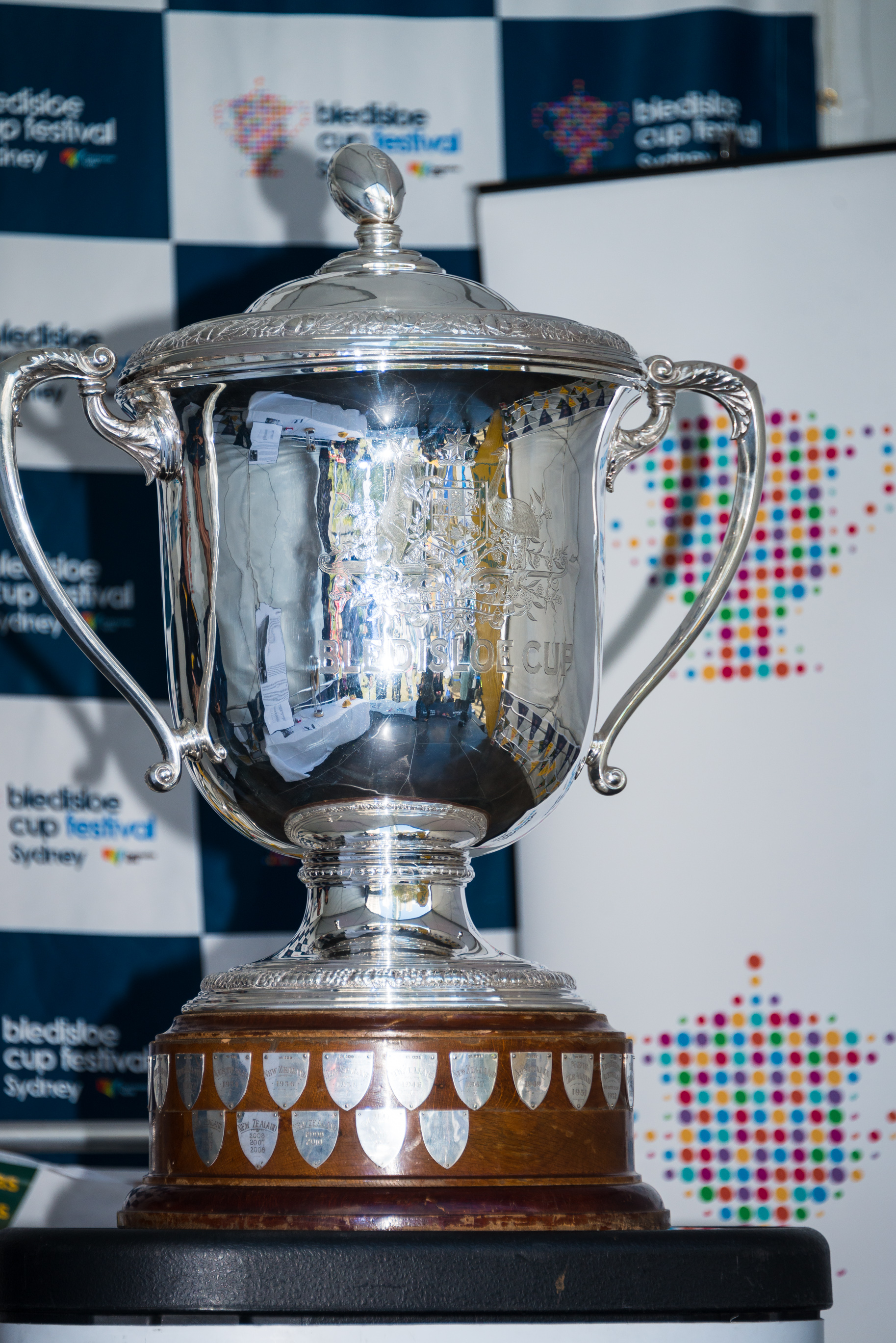
The Bledisloe Cup

The Bledisloe Cup is a trophy introduced by the Governor General of New Zealand, Lord Bledisloe, in 1947 to honour the rivalry between New Zealand and Australia. The Cup is awarded to the winner of each annual series of test matches played. Matches played at Rugby World Cups do not count towards the competition.

==== End-of-year tests ====
The Australian rugby team annually plays a test series against other squads, either at home acting as host nation to visiting teams, or touring overseas.

=== Rugby's domestic presence in Australia ===
When Australia became one of the world's best sides in the 1980s, the team was largely drawn from the NSW Waratahs and Queensland Reds. The ACT Brumbies had become another strong province by the 1990s and joined the Super 12 competition with the Waratahs and Reds in 1996, playing against the top rugby provinces from New Zealand and South Africa. The Western Force, based in Perth, joined the competition in 2006 when it expanded to become the Super 14, and the Melbourne Rebels were added when it became Super Rugby in 2011.

The strongholds of the game are still in New South Wales and Queensland where rugby football, initially rugby union and later rugby league, has been the dominant code since the 1880s. Rugby was introduced to other cities and regions at around the same time but Melbourne rules (now Australian football) was preferred in the southern states. Rugby union had a diminished national profile for many decades after rugby league became the more popular football code in Sydney and Brisbane prior to the first world war. The game gradually expanded its reach again after the second world war, and rugby union was re-established in most areas of the country by the 1970s, however rugby league is by far the more dominant code in NSW, Victoria and Queensland.

==== Super Rugby ====
After many changes in format, Super Rugby now involves four Australian sides (Queensland Reds, New South Wales Waratahs, ACT Brumbies, and Western Force), along with 5 New Zealand sides and two Pacific Island teams.

Prior to the creation of professional Super Rugby in 1996, there were a number of other Oceania-African competitions that featured representative teams from both Queensland and New South Wales, such as the Super 10 competition, which Queensland won twice. Before that there was the South Pacific Championship, also known as the Super 6. State teams have been playing each other in representative matches since the late 1800s, with the first match being played on the 12th of August 1882 at the Sydney Cricket Ground between New South Wales and Queensland. The match ending in a 26-4 victory for New South Wales.

===== Australian Provincial Championship and Australian Rugby Championship =====
The Australian Provincial Championship (APC) began in 2006, running for 1 year and featured the 4 Australian Super 14 teams, with the ACT Brumbies crowned APC champions. In 2007 this competition became the Australian Rugby Championship (ARC) and featured 8 new teams created specifically for the new league. The championship would only last for 1 year, playing out the whole 2007 season, before the decision was made by the Australian Rugby Union to fold the championship due to losses of $4.7 million for the 2007 season, and forecast losses for a 2008 season standing at a further $3.3 million. The Central Coast Rays were the only ARC champions defeating the Melbourne Rebels in the final.

The championship included teams which would go on to appear in other Rugby competitions. The Melbourne Rebels would join Super Rugby in 2011 and 3 teams would later join the National Rugby Championship.

==== National Rugby Championship ====
In late 2013, Rugby Australia (then known as the Australian Rugby Union) announced plans to launch a new domestic competition to be known as the National Rugby Championship (NRC) with the goal of bridging the gap between club rugby and Super Rugby. Originally expected to involve 10 teams, and ultimately unveiled in March 2014 with nine teams, the NRC began play in August 2014, with the season running through to November. The inaugural NRC teams included four in NSW, two in Queensland and one each in Canberra, Melbourne and Perth. After the 2016 season, one of the NSW teams was dropped from the competition and was replaced by the Fijian Drua, an effective developmental side for the Fiji national team. The competition was disbanded in 2020.

==== Club competitions ====
Each major city and many country areas support club rugby competitions in Australia. The club competitions in NSW and Queensland are the oldest and most prestigious. The NSWRU runs the Shute Shield, the highest level in New South Wales along with also running the NSW Country Championships played by regional representative teams from country areas in NSW. Similarly the QRU runs the Queensland Premier Rugby competition, which is the top Brisbane club competition, as well as the Queensland Country Championships for representative teams in the major regions of greater Queensland. All other states also run their own club competitions of varying strength, but the NSW and Queensland competitions have historically been regarded as the major domestic competitions below Super Rugby

== Television coverage ==
The Nine Network owns the broadcast rights to the majority of major Australian and Southern Hemisphere competitions and airs them on through streaming service Stan, as well as providing select coverage on its free-to-air television channels.

Within the first year of the new deal, Super Rugby games were regularly gathering more than 120 000 on 9Gem and Stan Sport had more than 250 000 subscribers. The Super Rugby AU Final between Queensland and the ACT pulled more than 1.3 million viewers across all platforms. Rugby Australia Chairman Hamish McLennan hailed it as a turning point for the sport. 2023 figures are 71,000 for Round 1 of Super Rugby 2023.

=== Free-to-air on Nine ===
- The Rugby Championship (Wallabies home matches and Bledisloe cup matches)
- Wallabies internationals
- Super Rugby Pacific (select matches and grand final)
- Shute Shield (select matches)
- Queensland Premier Rugby (select matches)

=== Stan Sport ===
- The Rugby Championship
- Six Nations
- Wallabies internationals
- New Zealand, South Africa and Argentina home internationals
- Super Rugby Pacific
- Super W
- Super Rugby Aupiki
- Mitre 10 Cup
- Currie Cup
- Shute Shield
- Queensland Premier Rugby
- RugbyWA Premier Grade
- July and November Internationals
- Premiership Rugby
- Japan Rugby League One

=== Other content ===
==== BeIN Sports ====
- Six Nations
- England, Scotland, Wales, Ireland, France and Italy home internationals
- European Rugby Champions Cup

==== RugbyPass ====
- United Rugby Championship

== See also ==
- Sport in Australia

== Bibliography ==
- Godwin, Terry; Rhys, Chris (1981). The Guinness Book of Rugby Facts & Feats. Enfield: Guinness Superlatives Ltd. ISBN 0-85112-214-0.
- Hibbins, Gillian; Ruddell, Trevor (2009). ""A Code of Our Own": Celebrating 150 Years of the Rules of Australian Football" (PDF). The Yorker (39). Archived (PDF) from the original on 2 April 2015.
- Hickie, Tom V (1983). The Game for the Game Itself; The Development of Sub-District Rugby in Sydney. Sydney Sub-Districts Rugby Union. ISBN 978-0959194104.
- Horton, Peter A (1990). A history of Rugby Union football in Queensland 1882-1891 (PhD thesis 101MB). The University of Queensland.
- Richards, Huw (2007). A Game for Hooligans: The History of Rugby Union. Edinburgh: Mainstream Publishing. ISBN 978-1-84596-255-5.
