= Rugby union in Western Australia =

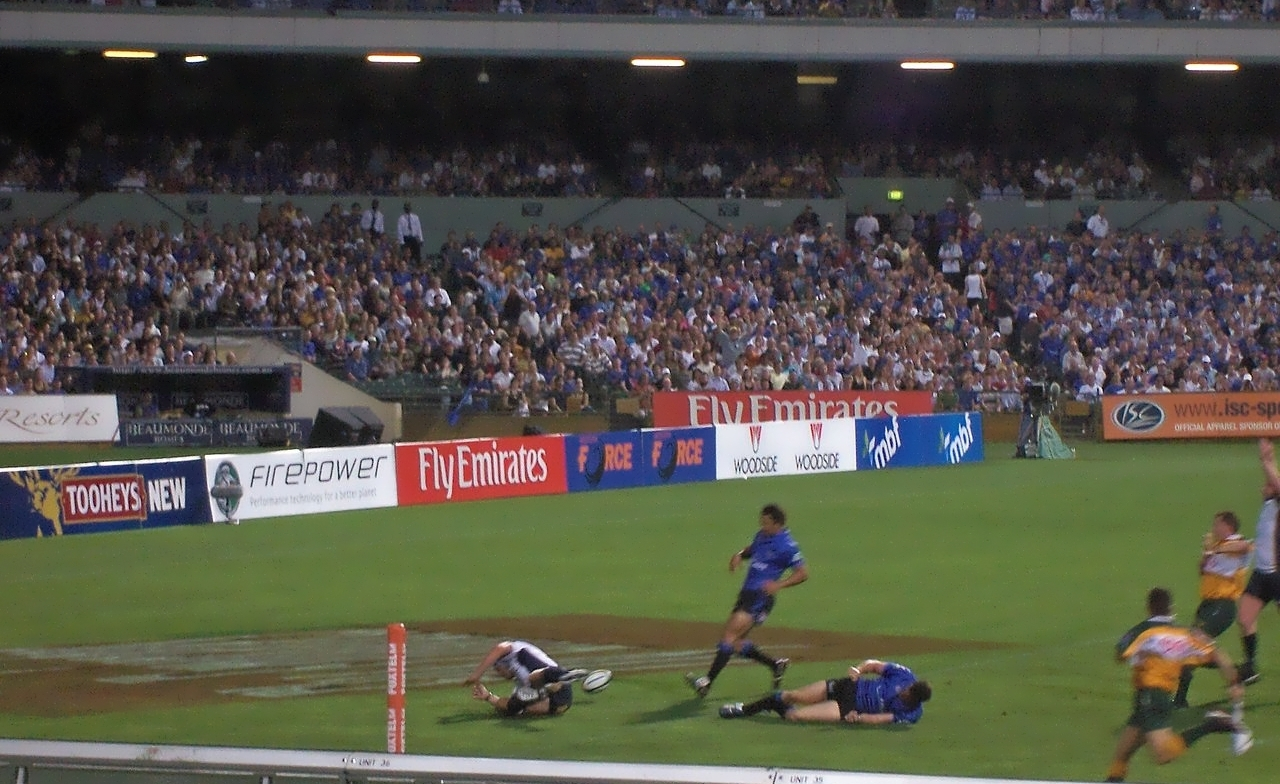
- Western Force play the Brumbies at Subiaco in 2006.
- Governing body: RugbyWA
- State team: Western Force
- First played: 1868, Perth, Western Australia
- Registered players: 2,785 (adult); 1,003 (child)

Club competitions
- Super Rugby; National Rugby Championship; RugbyWA Premier Grade

Audience records
- Single match: 61,241 (2019) Bledisloe Cup, Australia v New Zealand

Rugby union in Western Australia describes the sport of rugby union being played and watched in the state of Western Australia. First introduced some time in 1868 it was the most popular football code until it was overtaken by Australian rules there in 1885. After a period of decline and recess between 1909 and 1927 it grew throughout the 20th century. The governing body is the Western Australia Rugby Union (RugbyWA).

Rugby clubs are centred on the metropolitan Perth and Fremantle, the game is uncommon elsewhere. While rugby is less popular with spectators in Western Australia than Australian rules football and cricket, it holds the record attendance of any sporting event in the state, with 61,241 attending the Bledisloe Cup at Optus Stadium in 2019.

Western Australia is the home of the Western Force, a franchise in the Super Rugby competition since 2006. Their home ground is HBF Park, which has a capacity of 20,500 spectators. The development team is the Perth Spirit, which has competed in the Australian Rugby Championship in 2007 and the National Rugby Championship since 2014.

== History ==
=== Early history: 1860-1892 ===
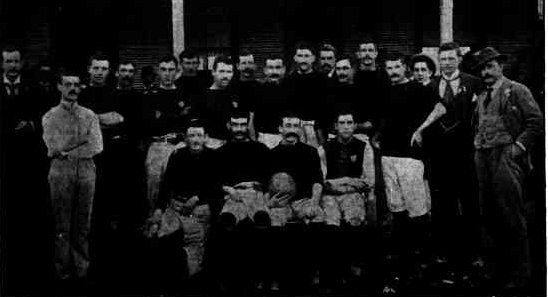
Coolgardie rugby football team in 1896

Rugby was first played in the Colony of Western Australia in the late 1860s and early 1870s.

Matches under rugby influenced military rules were played in 1868 by a team from West Yorkshire Regiment against a local sides in Perth (on the grounds of the Bishop’s Collegiate School) and Fremantle.

The first documented football games in the colony under rugby union laws took place in 1878 at the Bishop’s Collegiate School in Perth, primarily due to the influence of Lieutenant St John St George Ord, son of the Governor of Western Australia, Sir Harry Ord. The following year rugby was taken up by the schoolboys at Perth's The High School.

Club football began in Perth in 1882, and while rugby union was initially and for a time the dominant code, over the remainder of the decade was in battle with Australian rules for the allegiance of players and clubs. By 1888 rugby union was not being played.

=== Rugby Revival and Interstate matches: 1893-1908 ===
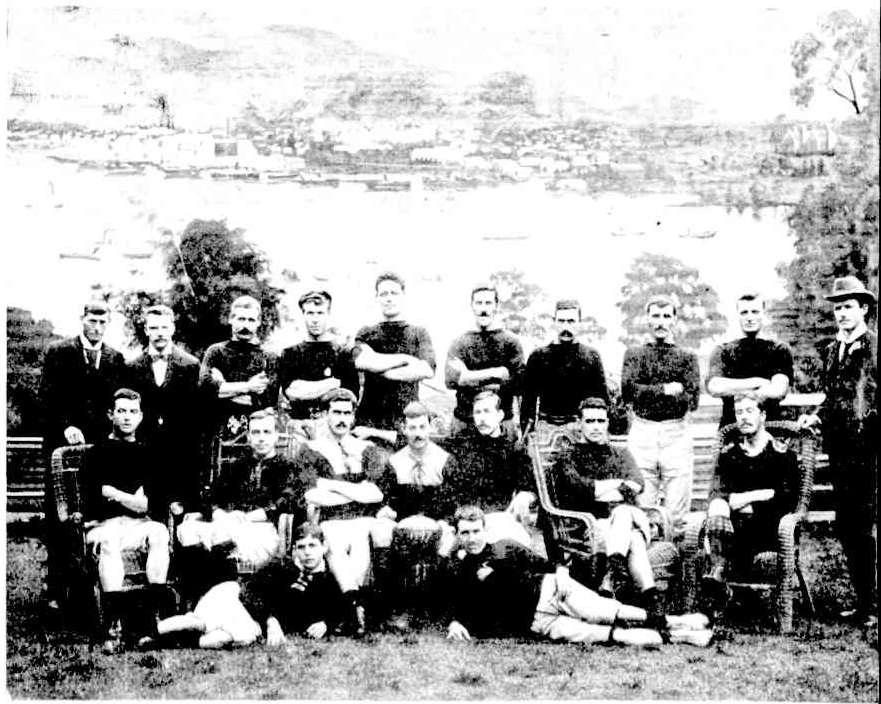
Swan rugby football team in 1897

Led by West Australian cricketer Lionel Gouly and the westward migration impacts of the Western Australian gold rushes, the 1890s saw a revival in West Australian rugby and it continued to be played by a small number of clubs sufficient to form the Western Australian Rugby Union in 1893.

A four team competition commenced in 1895 with the I Zingari, Fremantle, Swans and Midland Junction Club's taking part. These clubs were joined by a Goldfields Association consisting of the Coolgardie Rugby Football Club and Kalgoorlie Rugby Football Club (Goldfields) (1896). Other Perth based clubs to form later included the Pirate Football Club (1898) and Metropolitan Rugby Football Club (1900).

At the turn of the 20th Century, Rugby was rapidly growing in popularity, with a combined Metropolitan vs Districts matches being played interstate matches including the Goldfields and a schools competition begun.

From 1905, Perth, Pioneers and Swan competed for the Levinson Cup, the competition was able to gain access to play on Australian rules football grounds and crowds grew to thousands with some games rivaling the popularity of Australian rules.

In 1907 the NSWRU sent a NSW representative team on a four match tour, defeating ‘Metropolitan’ at Fremantle, ‘Gold Fields’ at Kalgoorlie, and Western Australia twice in Perth.The following year the 1908-09 Australian team on their sea voyage from Sydney to Great Britain played a match against a combined 'Western Australian' side at Fremantle Oval.

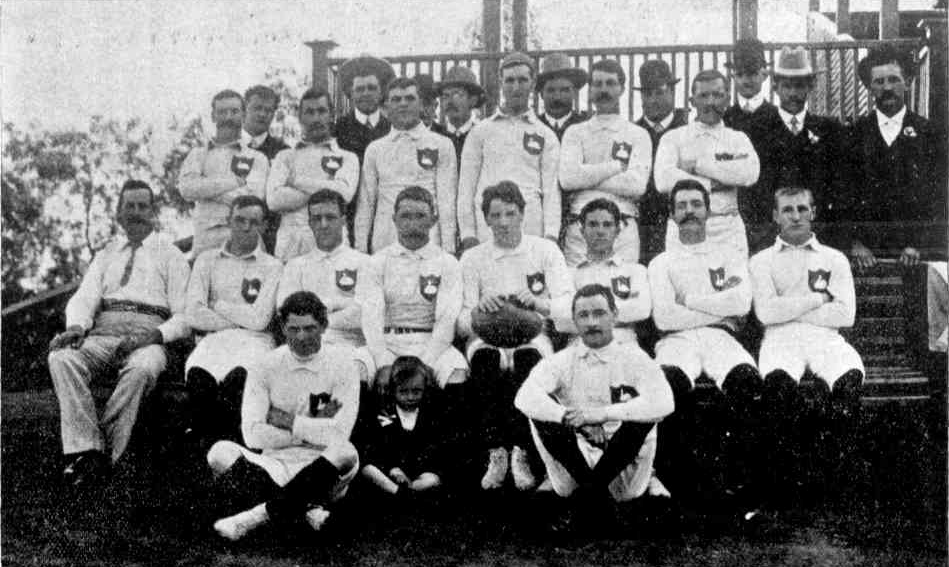
Goldfields Rugby Football Team that played New South Wales in 1908

=== Decline and Hiatus: 1909-1927 ===
Competition in Perth waned severely in 1909, though the game continued to be played in the Goldfields region, particularly by the Kalgoorlie Rugby Club.

The popularity of rugby faded slowly, with only sporadic competition. Though teams from Sydney continued to tour and promote the game Western Australia's rugby teams were not nearly competitive against New South Wales, however Western Australia's Australian Football team proved it could be competitive against Victoria taking out the Jubilee Australasian Football Carnival in 1908. While the school competitions were initially thriving, the code suffered substantially with the successful lobbying of the Young Australia League resulting in the introduction of Australian rules football into Western Australian schools and rugby union junior numbers virtually non-existent. As rugby in the remote mines also faded, Australian rules clubs were beginning to incorporate some of the rugby rules including vigorous tackling.

In the face of dwindling numbers, in Perth only two clubs remained: Fremantle and Central. Matches were played at the Esplanade. A visiting Sydney side played Central in June 1909 in front of a large crowd at the Esplanade.

=== Modern revival: 1928- ===
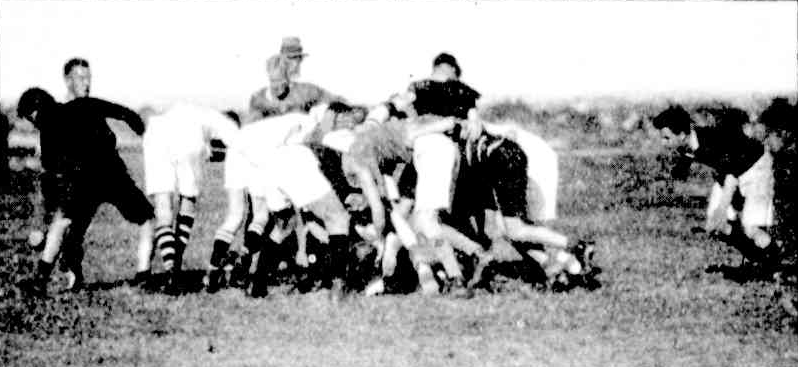
Rugby match in Perth in 1928

The international success and playing style of the 1927/28 NSW Waratahs revitalised interest in rugby union across the whole of Australia for the 1928 winter, including in Western Australia. In Fremantle in May 1928 enthusiasts for the code watched the New Zealand All Blacks train during a brief stopover on their way to South Africa. A meeting was then held to restablish the WARU.

Rugby had not been played in WA for 23 years however it was revived in June 1928 when two teams contested a match in Perth. It was followed by a restarted school competition and the formation of Perth and Fremantle clubs who played at Cottesloe. They were joined by a Northern Suburbs team.

A state team was once again assembled in 1929 to compete against a visiting team from HMAS Canberra. Rugby in 1930 was once again attracting record crowds, and a 4 team competition was in full swing. The competition was strong enough to field a West Australian team to compete against the touring Great Britain however they were beaten 71 to 3 in front of a crowd of 6,000.

=== 21st Century ===
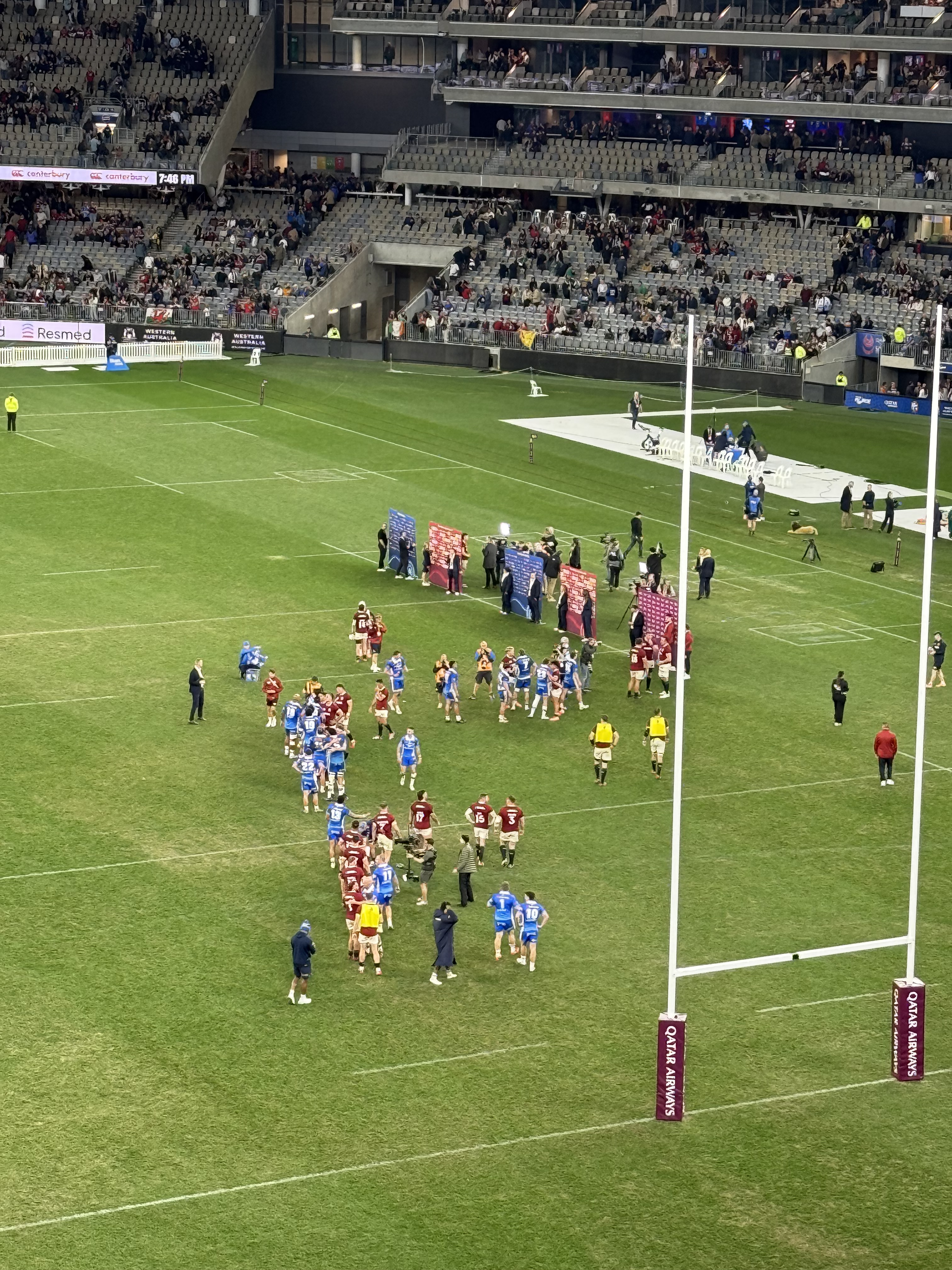
Match between the Western Force and the British & Irish Lions in 2025

Rugby was relegated to a minor sport until it experienced a revival in the 2000s aided by international migration. In 2006 the Perth-based Western Force club was formed and entered the Super Rugby competition.

== Participation ==
Category	2021/22	2023/24	2025
Adult Male		2,348	
Adult Female		437	
Junior		5549	
Total Female			1,700
Total	12,550	2,785	14,000

== Notable players ==
- Bob Thompson first player selected to play for the Wallabies from a WA Club
- John Welborn (retired, first Western Australian born to represent the Wallabies) - NSW Waratahs, Sharks (Currie Cup), Leicester Tigers, CA Brive, Western Force, Australia
- Brett Sheehan - NSW Waratahs, Queensland Reds, Western Force, Australia
- Adam Wallace-Harrison - ACT Brumbies, Queensland Reds, Australia A
- Kyle Godwin - Western Force, Australia under-20, Australia
- Kieran Longbottom - Western Force
- Dane Haylett-Petty - Western Force, Melbourne Rebels, Australia under-19, Australia
- Luke Burton - Western Force, Australia under-20
- Ross Haylett-Petty - Western Force, Melbourne Rebels, Australia under-20
- Scott Higginbotham - Queensland Reds, Melbourne Rebels, Australia
- David Collis - Queensland Reds
- Harry Scoble - Western Force, Australian Schoolboys, Australia under-20
- Darren Murphy - Queensland A
- Curtis Rona - Western Force, Australia; New Zealand under-20 rugby league, New Zealand Māori rugby league
- Will Brock - Perth Spirit, Australia sevens
- Jake Ball - Western Force, Wales
- Richard Hardwick - Western Force, Melbourne Rebels, Australia "A" Schoolboys, Australia, Namibia
- Daniel Montagu - Nottingham R.F.C., Leicester Tigers
- Ryan Tyrrell - Perth Spirit
- Dan Bailey - Perth Spirit
- John Trend - Perth Spirit

== See also ==
- RugbyWA
- RugbyWA Premier Grade
- Perth Spirit
- Western Force

== Sources ==
- Bloomfield, John (2003). Australia's Sporting Success: The Inside Story. UNSW Press. ISBN 978-0-86840-582-7.
