= Pekahou Cowan =

Pek Cowan
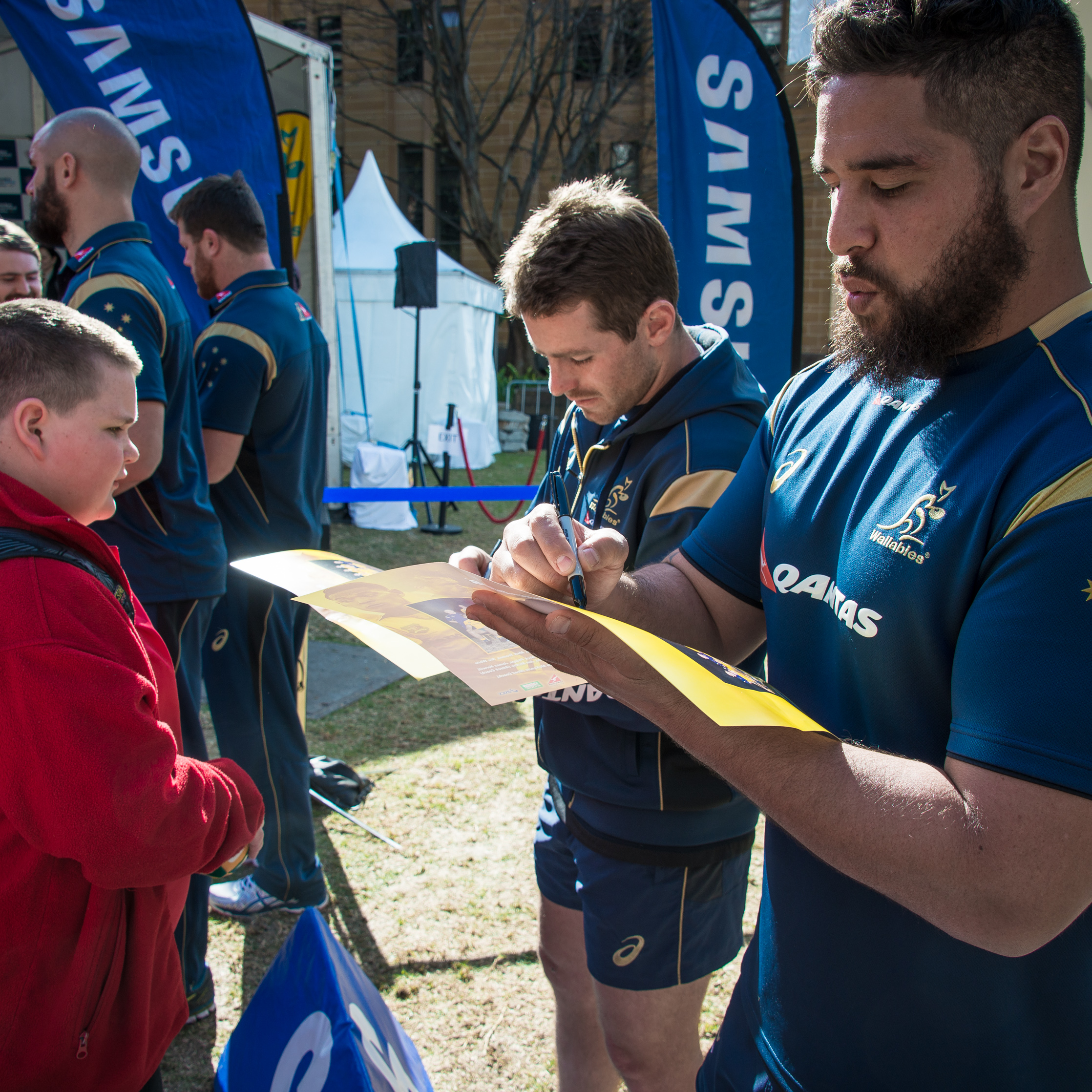
- Born: Pekahou J. M. Cowan; 2 June 1986 (age 40) Wellington, New Zealand
- Height: 1.85 m (6 ft 1 in)
- Weight: 116 kg (256 lb)
- Notable relative: Blair Cowan (cousin)

Rugby union career
- Position: Prop / Hooker
- Current team: Nedlands
Senior career
Years	Team	Apps	(Points)
2007, 2014, 2016–2017	Perth Spirit	17	(5)
2019−2020	Shimizu Blue Sharks	8	(5)
Super Rugby
Years	Team	Apps	(Points)
2006–2017, 2020	Western Force	135	(25)
2021	NSW Waratahs	1	(0)
- Correct as of 13 June 2021
International career
Years	Team	Apps	(Points)
2009–2014	Wallabies	10	(0)
2008	Australia A		
2003–2004	Australian Schools		
- Correct as of 14 September 2014

Pekahou J. M. Cowan (born 2 June 1986) is an Australian rugby union footballer who plays for Wellington in New Zealand's National Provincial Championship. His usual position is prop and he can play on both sides of the scrum.

== Early life ==
Cowan was born in Wellington, New Zealand but moved with his family to Sydney when he was 13 years of age. He was a young golfing talent with a handicap of four at the age of 15, and won a scholarship with the Long Reef Golf Club. Attending Narrabeen Sports High School, he was selected for the Australian Schoolboys rugby union team in 2003 and 2004.

== Career ==
He moved to Perth to further his rugby career and played for the Nedlands club before signing with the Western Force in 2006. He played for the Perth Spirit in the Australian Rugby Championship in 2007.

Cowan made his test debut for the Wallabies against Italy in Melbourne on 20 June 2009 shortly after his 23rd birthday.

After the Western Force were axed from the Super Rugby competition in 2017, Cowan played two seasons in Japan for the Top East League side Shimizu Blue Sharks.

He rejoined the Western Force in 2020 when the team was admitted to Super Rugby AU, then signed with the NSW Waratahs in 2021. Later that year, he returned to his birthplace of Wellington to play in New Zealand's National Provincial Championship.

== Super Rugby statistics ==
As of 22 November 2017

Season	Team	Games	Starts	Sub	Mins	Tries	Cons	Pens	Drops	Points	Yel	Red
2008	Force	9	8	1	567	0	0	0	0	0	0	0
2009	Force	12	11	1	822	0	0	0	0	0	0	0
2010	Force	9	8	1	580	1	0	0	0	5	1	0
2011	Force	12	11	1	762	0	0	0	0	0	0	0
2012	Force	16	13	3	1160	0	0	0	0	0	0	0
2013	Force	15	15	0	1174	2	0	0	0	10	0	0
2014	Force	16	14	2	955	1	0	0	0	5	0	0
2015	Force	14	14	0	934	1	0	0	0	5	0	0
2016	Force	12	11	1	718	0	0	0	0	0	1	0
2017	Force	15	7	8	613	0	0	0	0	0	0	0
2020 AU	Force	5	4	1	286	0	0	0	0	0	0	0
2021	Waratahs	1	0	1	27	0	0	0	0	0	0	0
Total		136	116	20	8805	5	0	0	0	25	2	0
