= Cottesloe Rugby Union Football Club =

Australian rugby union club, based in Perth, Western Australia

(Australia) Cottesloe RUFC
- Full name: Cottesloe Rugby Union Football Club
- Unions: Australian Rugby Union
- Union: RugbyWA
- Nickname(s): Cotts, Cott, The Seagulls
- Emblem: Seagull
- Founded: 1893; 133 years ago
- Disbanded: 1939–1948
- Location: Cottesloe, Western Australia
- Ground: Harvey Field
- President: Sam Diamond
- Director of Rugby: Craig Fairhall
- Coach: Ryan Westaway
Team kit

Official website
- www.cottrugby.com

Cottesloe Rugby Union Football Club, often shorted to "Cottesloe", "Cott" Cotts" or "The Seagulls", is a rugby union club based in Cottesloe, Perth, Western Australia. The club claims to be the oldest club currently competing in the RugbyWA Premier Grade, on the basis it was formed as "The Pirates" in 1893, making it older than the West Australian Rugby Union itself (RugbyWA). The club moved to Harvey Field in 1930 and have kept this as their home since. In 1930 the club also changed their colours to their current "Two Blue strip" and became known as the Seagulls or just "Gulls".

== History ==
=== Early years ===
The original Pirates club was formed in 1893 and donned a black jersey with the insignia of a skull and crossbones over the left breast. It played in the local Perth-Fremantle competition 1893 to 1901 and again in 1905. There was no club rugby union between 1913 and 1927, with the WARU founded in 1928 who divided its players into four teams. In March 1929 the Cottesloe-Claremont RFC was founded at the Cottesloe Surf Life Saving Club.

When the club joined the WARU they changed their name to the seagulls and retained the black and white jerseys for 2 years until adopting their current club colours that of the "Two Blue strips". When WW2 broke out most of the clubs disbanded (like a lot of clubs) and Cott combined with Perth (now Perth Bayswater) for a few years in a small competition. The club was reformed in 1948 by pre-war members.

=== Post War Years ===
The 1950s were very successful for Cottesloe, achieving a minor Premiership in 1954 and major premiers in 1955 and 1956. The mid 60's was dire times fore Cottesloe, becoming a victim of the restructuring of the competition, players dwindled, debts were high and the death of the club looked near. The club borrowed money from the union, bought a set of jumpers and an SOS was sent out for players. Although the club finished last in the 1962 season, for the first time in their history, their debts had gone and the club was no longer in financial trouble. The club had an emphasis on schoolboy rugby, with many of the states best schoolboy players playing exclusively for Cottesloe. Up until 1963 the club trained on The Esplanade, sharing a small change room with Western Suburbs (Now Wests Scarborough). In 1964 training on Thursday nights was moved to Cottesloe and training on Tuesday nights continued at The Esplanade. In 1965, lights were installed at Cottesloe Oval and so the club moved there for training on both nights and for games. From 1971 to 1974, renovations at an old house on Broome Street, overlooking the pitch, became the clubs current clubhouse. The 1980s were a very successful time for the club, Premiers from 1984 to 1985 and again in 1988. The nineties saw another Premiership in 1992 and the formation of the Cottesloe Women's team (The Shegulls) in 1996 with them, themselves winning their first Premiership in 1999.

== Honours (Since 1967) ==
- Premier Grade (12)

1979, 1982, 1983, 1984, 1985, 1988, 1992, 2001, 2009, 2019, 2020, 2021

- Championship (Second) Grade (8)

1976, 1986, 1987, 1992, 1993, 1994, 2019, 2020

- Third Grade (6)

1977, 1987, 1990, 1994, 2003, 2008

- Fourth Grade (8)

1974, 1984, 1987, 1995, 1998, 2011, 2012, 2015

- Fifth Grade (2)

2013, 2014

- Colts (2)

1967, 2010

- Women's (5)

1998, 2005, 2006, 2013, 2021, 2022

== Notable players ==
Men

- Dane Haylett-Petty – Western Force, Australia.
- Ollie Hoskins – Western Force, Australia.

Women

- Rebecca Clough – Australia.
- Natasha Haines – Australia.
- Debby Hodgkinson – Australia
