= Nedlands Rugby Union Football Club =

Australian rugby union club, based in Nedlands, WA

(Australia) Nedlands RUFC
- Full name: Nedlands Rugby Union Football Club
- Unions: Australian Rugby Union
- Union: RugbyWA
- Nickname: Neddies
- Emblem: Heraldic Lion Rampant
- Founded: 1934; 92 years ago
- Location: Nedlands, Western Australia
- Ground: Charles Court Reserve
- League: RugbyWA Premier Grade
Team kit

Official website
- www.nedlandsrugby.com.au

Nedlands Rugby Union Football Club, often referred to as Neddies, is a rugby union club based in Nedlands, Western Australia, with several teams competing in the local RugbyWA competitions including the RugbyWA Premier Grade.

The club trains and plays its home games at Charles Court Reserve located on the banks of the Swan River in Nedlands. The club has a large function centre and licensed bar facility which overlooks the rugby grounds.

== History ==
Established in 1934, Nedlands RUFC represents an area not much older than the club itself. In 1931, the Claremont Roads Board split and formed the Nedlands Road Board, later becoming Nedlands Municipal Council and then City of Nedlands. Land in the area had initially been settled in the 1850s by Captain John Bruce, and he bequeathed the land to his son Edward – hence the area became known as Ned’s Land, later morphing into Nedlands. The club's emblem – the rampant lion, is thought to have derived from the badge of the Bruce family.

Nedlands RUFC was formed at a meeting in Alec E Davies’ tearooms on the corner of Broadway and The Esplanade called by Cliff Stark, at 7:45 pm on 5 April 1934. In that first season, the club fielded just one team with players wearing a black jumper with a large gold N on the chest. The jumper was changed to blue and gold in 1962 to conform with the colours of the original Claremont Road Board.

The club initially played on a ground made up from four vacant blocks on Aberdare Rd. After nearly 20 years of temporary fields, Neddies was finally granted a permanent home on the Nedlands Foreshore in 1951, after using it unofficially since 1946. The Foreshore had been reclaimed from the Swan River before and after World War 1, and in the 1930s was a highly popular camping and holiday ground. But as West Australians became more mobile after WW2, the demand for its use fell away and it became a sports ground. Initially, the park was shared between the Nedlands and Associates clubs, but Associates moved to a ground of their own in the 1980s.

After finding its feet in the 1934 season, the Club won the 1935 B Grade grand-final. With success, membership rose from 24 in 1935 to 55 in 1936. With teams in both the B and C grade, the club pushed for promotion to A grade. This was granted in 1939, and the following year, Nedlands won the 1940 A Grade grand final. This team included some of the significant names in the club's history with Cliff Stark, Bob McMillan, Laurie Simmonds. John Poor and Joe Poynton all featuring in the club's records in the years to come. Captain Laurie Simmonds’ son Ken featured in the club's third A Grade premiership team thirty years later in 1970. 80 years after their great grandfather led Neddies, another generation of Simmonds are turning out.

World War 2 and its aftermath brought hard times to Nedlands, compounded by a breakaway group who went to rugby league in the early 1950s. While some of these players returned to the fold, and the Club won a famous A Grade premiership in 1957, this was a difficult period for Nedlands. For a time, they were only kept alive by the determination and great work of men like Joe Poynton, Jim Stitfall and Jim Macauley. Charlie Duncan and his wife Jess were also key in holding the club together, with Jess serving as both club secretary and Colts coach for a number of years.

== 1960-1999 ==
The club's fortunes began to change in 1963, with the arrival of Peter Bailey. Bailey, known as the father of the modern Nedlands club came to Perth for the Commonwealth Games in 1962 and fell in love with the city and with Nedlands. He introduced a “kiwi connection” to the club and in the ensuing years served in a wide range of roles from player to coach to president, in the process building the foundations of the powerhouse that Nedlands has become. Many of the people who were to contribute to and lead the club in the next 40 years were nurtured by Bailey, including Steve Takiari, Terry Bradbury, Peter Shaw, Dave Walsh and Chris Lowson, together with great clubmen Rex Julian and Garry Ash who started the Thursday night dinners from the then tiny kitchen. Players such as Englishmen Dave Brock and Dave Rosewall, and Kiwi imports John Walker, Tim Lowson, Bradbury, Rob McKenzie, Peter Rowan, Graeme Holmes, Phil Hobbs and many others made huge on-field contributions to Nedlands through this period.

The 80s and 90s, along with the holding of the Americas Cup yacht races in Perth saw another influx of players to Nedlands, such as All Black Paul Koteka, and representative-level players like Peter Chadwick, Peter Roberts, Gavin Bermingham, Reg Walters, Nudge Edwards, Mike Ryburn, Glen Thompson, John O’Callaghan, and Tom Fearn. With coaches like Viv Booker, Wayne Hill, Dave McKnight, and Fearn guiding them, these men were successful in a highly competitive sport. When the WA State team went on tour, there were so many members from Nedlands that paying their tour levy to WARU placed severe financial strain on the club. The club's honours boards attested to the huge number of Nedlands players who have represented their state and even their country. During the 90s, a powerful Neddies Women's team swept all before it, and the club, in particular great stalwarts Sue Roberts and Freda Black, are keen to resurrect that team. The key administrator to emerge from these times was long-standing patron Richard Vaughan, who has contributed to the club in a myriad of ways.

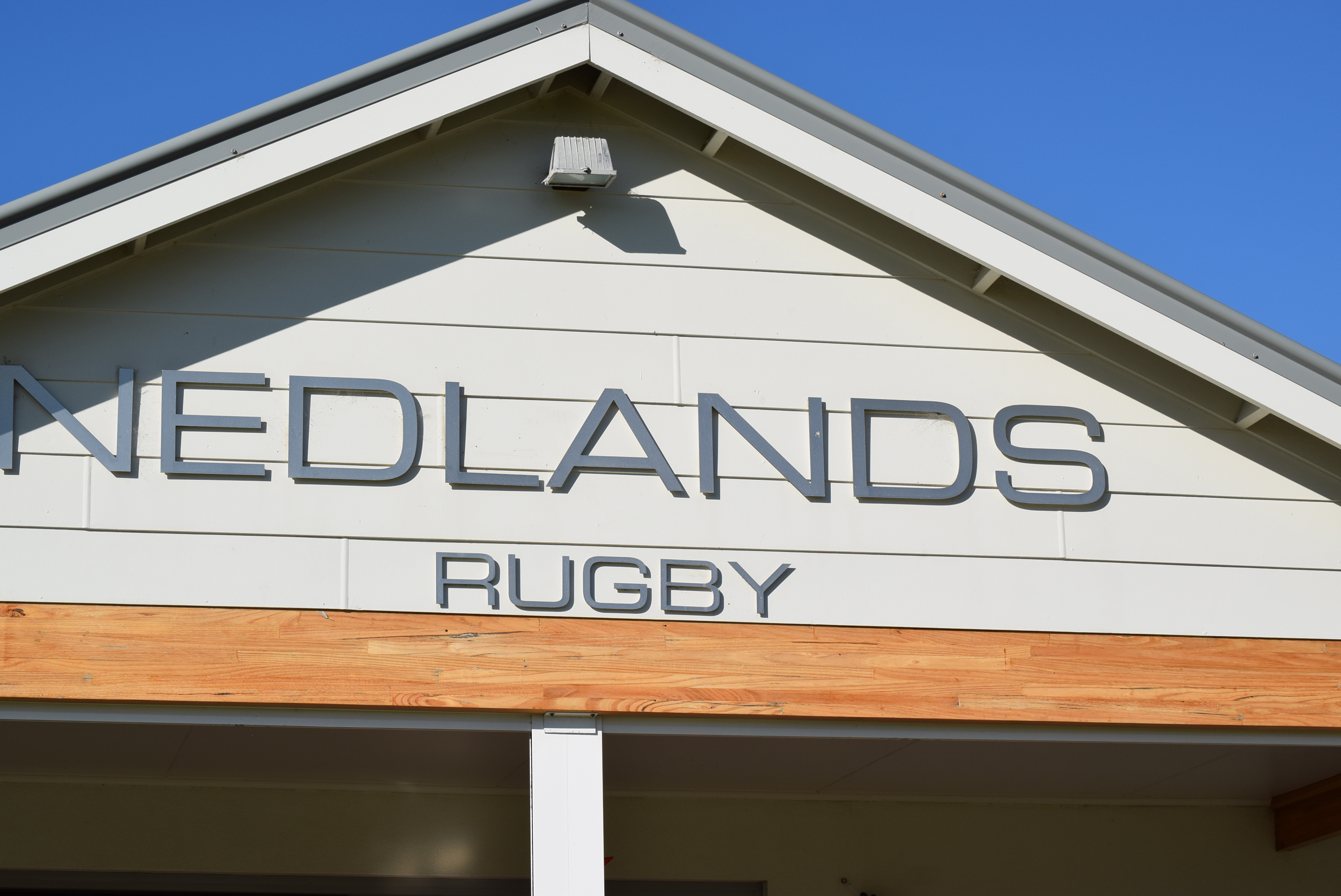
The current Nedlands clubrooms are at Charles Court Reserve.

== 21st Century ==
The 21st Century has seen another group represent and contribute to Nedlands. Tony and Rod Ball – sons of Life Member Kevin and themselves Life Members, and Terry Bradbury's son Steve – have been key members, along with Wendy Hickman, Lisa Vaughan, Craig Holdcroft and leaders Murray McLean, Hans Sauer, and Peter Malcolm. In 2009 the club celebrated its 75th Anniversary, marked by the publication of the book “Neddies – The First Seventy Five Years” written by Life Member Mark Drummond. The book included an earlier version “The Golden Lion” by Bob Messenger, which had been written to celebrate Nedlands’ 50th Anniversary. In 2013 the club changed its administration model from the traditional committee to a Board of Management. Past President and long-term sponsor Rick Wolozny guided the formation of the board of trustees to oversee the club's finances, and ensure that financial resources are put away for future projects. On the field Nathan Roberts has played more than 200 games for Nedlands, while Richie Naylor, Brad Wilkinson, Joe (Peanut) Ritchie, Alvin (Stardust) Lau, Trefor Thomas, Chris Naylor, and Dylan Loversidge have all made significant contributions. In 2017, the club had three members of the 1st grade team. Michael Ruru, Anaru Rangi and Jermaine Ainsley were offered contracts with the Western Force. After the demise of the Force, all three players have gone on to pursue their professional careers worldwide.

Nedlands members have also made contributions outside of the club. Many Nedlands administrators, including Sauer, Takiari, Lowson and Josh Aislabie have gone on to serve on the board of Rugby WA. Bradbury and Bailey were awarded Life Membership of organisation for their service.

== Coaches ==
Nedlands' head coach for 2023 in Premier Grade is Sam Rarasea, a former Nedlands Premier Grade player. Assisting him is Tony Ball as reserve grade head coach.

== Honours ==
- Premier Grade (18)

1940, 1957, 1970, 1973, 1978, 1980, 1981, 1986, 1989, 1990, 1993, 1994, 1995, 1999, 2000, 2010, 2013, 2015

== Notable members ==
Nedlands players to have gained international caps include:

- Jermaine Ainsley – Wallabies (2018)
- Callum Sauer – Germany (2011–2012)
- Pek Cowan – Wallabies (2009–2010)
- Robert Boulle – Mauritius (2009, 2011)
- Julien Le Blanc – Mauritius (2009, 2011)
- Olivier Baissac – Mauritius (2010–2011)
- Simon Harel – Mauritius (2011)
- John De Commarmond – Mauritius (2011)
- Adrian Bourgault – Mauritius (2011)
- Francois Audibert – Mauritius (2009–2010)
- Nicky Tyrone Little – Fiji (1996–2011)
- Tohoa Tauroa (Paul) Koteka – All Blacks (1981–1982)
- Geoff Valli – All Blacks (1980)
- Murray Watts – All Blacks (1979–1980)
- Spencer Brown – Wallabies (1952–1953)

== See also ==
- RugbyWA
- City of Nedlands
