= John Welborn =

Australia international rugby union player

- Born: 8 September 1970 (age 56) Perth, Western Australia
- Height: 1.97 m (6 ft 5 1/2 in)
- Weight: 120 kg (260 lb)

Rugby union career
- Position: Lock
Senior career
Years	Team	Apps	(Points)
1999	Leicester	6	(0)
2003–2005	CA Brive	33	(10)
Provincial / State sides
Years	Team	Apps	(Points)
1989–1991	Western Australia	15	
1994–2000	Waratahs	63	(35)
Super Rugby
Years	Team	Apps	(Points)
1996–1999	Waratahs	25	(25)
2006	Western Force	10	(0)
International career
Years	Team	Apps	(Points)
1996–1999	Australia	6	(0)
1996	Australia A		

John Welborn (born 8 September 1970) is a former Australian rugby union player, who played at the lock position. He is a former Wallaby. He was the first Western Australian-born player to represent Australia in rugby union, and played six matches for the Wallabies.

During his career, Welborn played for CA Brive in Ligue Nationale de Rugby's TOP 14 division, the Sharks in the Currie Cup, Leicester Tigers in the Guinness Premiership, and for the Western Force in Super Rugby.

== Early life ==
Welborn grew up in Perth, Western Australia, where he attended Scotch College. After gaining a Bachelor of Commerce degree from the University of Western Australia and representing the state in 15 senior rugby games, he moved to Sydney in 1992 to follow his ambition of playing rugby for Australia.

== Rugby career ==
In New South Wales, Welborn earned 63 caps for the Waratahs from 1994 to 2000, remaining their most capped second row forward of all time. Representing the Wallabies between 1996 and 1999, he played six tests for Australia. He also had successful playing stints with the Sharks in South Africa and the Leicester Tigers in the UK before moving to France where he played five seasons for famous French club Brive. In 2006, he was a founding member of the Western Force.

== Post-rugby career ==
Following his retirement from professional rugby, Welborn worked as an investment banker. In 2010, he was appointed to the board of Tourism WA.

In June 2025, Welborn was appointed chairperson of RugbyWA, following a stint as president of the organisation.
