= RugbyWA =

Australian governing body of rugby union

- Sport: Rugby union
- Jurisdiction: Western Australia
- Founded: 1893; 132 years ago
- Affiliation: Rugby Australia
- Affiliation date: 1949
- Headquarters: WA Rugby Centre, Mount Claremont
- President: Josh Aislabie
- Chairman: John Welborn
- CEO: Simon Taylor
- (founded): Western Australia Rugby Union

Official website
- wa.rugby
- (Western Australia)

The Western Australia Rugby Union (RugbyWA) is the governing body of rugby union in Western Australia. The organisation develops and fosters rugby in Western Australia, from junior level to professional level. As of 2024, more than 13,923 people played rugby union in Western Australia across 33 clubs and 275 teams. As of 2019, the state government provided around $160,000 a year towards RugbyWA's operating costs.

The highest competition run by the organisation is the RugbyWA Premier Grade.

== History ==
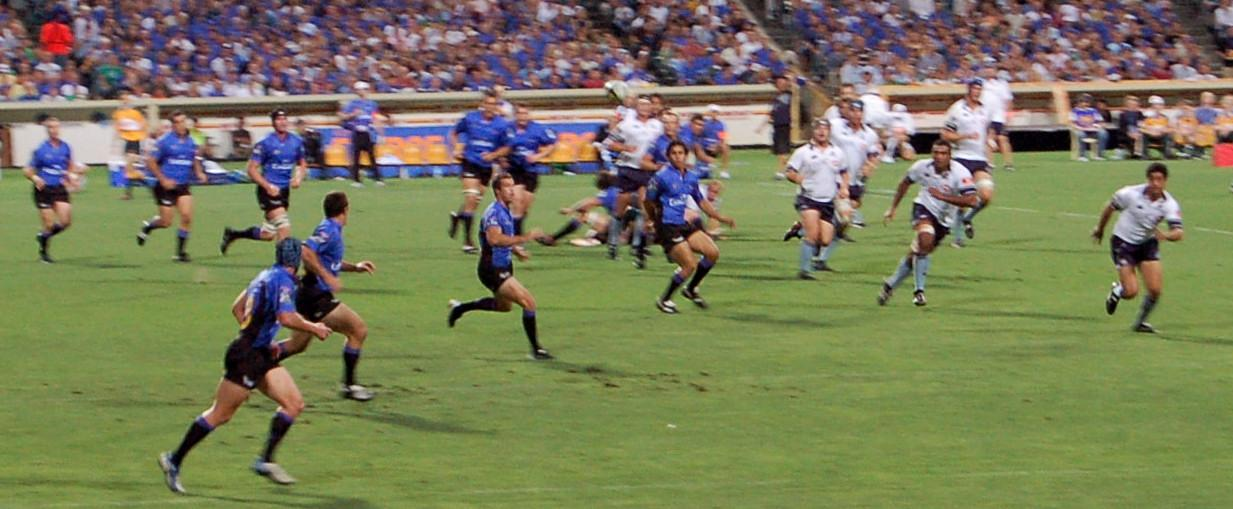
A Western Force game in 2006

RugbyWA was founded in 1893. The organisation's inaugural competition commenced in 1895 with four teams: the I Zingari, Fremantle, Swans and Midland Junction Club. The WARU Senior Grade competition was contested from 1895 to 1913.

The Rugby Football code went into recess in the west from the 1914 season until 1928 when 4 Clubs; Wanderers, Rangers, Wallabies and Fremantle revived the First Grade Club Competition.

In 2004, RugbyWA successfully secured the fourth Australian Super 12 licence, entering a team in the expanded Super 14 competition from 2006, called the Western Force.

In 2009, RugbyWA were given a $2.4 million interest-free loan to upgrade nib Stadium. As of 2019, RugbyWA were still $1 million in debt to the state government.

In 2016, Rugby Australia bought the Force intellectual property – including naming rights, colours and branding – from RugbyWA in an $800,000 deal to help the franchise out of financial difficulty. The move effectively handed ownership of the Force to Rugby Australia. The following year, Rugby Australia cut the Force from the Super Rugby competition. RugbyWA took legal action to try to save the team, but was ultimately unsuccessful and the organisation was unable to afford to pay legal costs. As a result, RugbyWA briefly went into voluntary administration. Rugby Australia ultimately agreed to hand back its licence and to waive a $1 million legal bill. The club name and IP was leased back to RugbyWA as part of the deal.

== Representative teams ==
In addition to the Western Force, who currently compete in Super Rugby, RugbyWA also established the Perth Spirit in 2007. The team competed in the Australian Rugby Championship and National Rugby Championship before disbanding in 2018. In the National Rugby Championship, the Spirit won in 2016 while the Force won in 2019.

== Clubs ==
=== Premier Grade (1st Grade) ===
Est.	Colours	Club	Location	Home ground	Premierships*
1948		Associates	Swanbourne	Allen Park	10 (2024)
1893		Cottesloe	Cottesloe	Harvey Field	12 (2021)
1998		Joondalup Brothers	Joondalup	HBF Arena	N/A
1974		Kalamunda	Forrestfield	Hartfield Park	1 (2008)
1934		Nedlands	Nedlands	Charles Court Reserve	16 (2015)
1934		Palmyra	Alfred Cove	Tompkins Park	3 (2023)*
1906		Perth Bayswater	Morley	Pat O'Hara Reserve	3 (2007)*
1987		Southern Lions	Success	Success Oval	N/A
1929		Uni. of WA	Mount Claremont	UWA Sports Park	5 (2014)
1981		Wanneroo	Kingsway	Kingsway Reserve	1 (2025)
1930		Wests Scarborough	Doubleview	Bennett Park	12 (2022)
1995	-	Mandurah Pirates	Mandurah	Meadow Springs	N/A

- 1 of the 3 premierships won by Perth Bayswater was won as Perth-Suburbs
- 5 of the 12 premierships won by Wests Scarborough were won as Western Suburbs and 3 of the 12 premierships won by Wests Scarborough as Wests-Scarborough

*"(year)" Denotes the last year they won the premiership.

=== Championship & Community Grade ===
Est.	Colours	Club	Location	Homeground
1973		Rockingham	Rockingham	Lark Hill
1975		ARKs Harrissdale	Harrissdale	Harrissdale Community Oval
2019		Bunbury Barbarians	Australind	Leschenault leisure Centre
N/A		Bunbury City Bulls	Bunbury	Hay Park North
2016		Perth Irish	Belmont	Centenary Park
1969		Curtin University	Bentley	Edinburgh oval
1996		Dunsborough Busselton	Busselton	Barnard Park
2010		Kwinana Wolves	Wellard	Wellard Oval
2007		North Coast	Butler	Halesworth Park

== See also ==
- List of Australian club rugby union competitions
- Perth Spirit
- Rugby union in Western Australia
- Western Force
