= RugbyWA Premier Grade =

- Sport: Rugby union
- Formerly known as: West Australian Rugby Union First Grade
- Instituted: 1928
- Number of teams: 11
- Holders: Wanneroo (2025)
- Most titles: Nedlands (16)
- Relegation to: RugbyWA Championship Grade

The RugbyWA Premier Grade, known as the Fortescue Premier Grade under a naming rights deal, is the highest level of domestic club rugby played in Western Australia. It was formed in 1928 and was the first consistent competition for rugby union in Western Australia. It is competed annually from early April to the end of August. An annual pre-season tournament, the Challenge Cup is played in March. The competition is managed by RugbyWA. The Premier Grade is contested by 11 teams from the Greater Perth area.

The RugbyWA Premier Grade is offered in two competitions – the Men's Premier Grade and Women's Premier Grade. The Women's Premier Grade runs from early May until the end of August, with seven teams forming the competition.

In 2022, RugbyWA partnered with Stan Sport to broadcast one Premier Grade game per round, with occasional double headers alongside the Women's competition.

== Current Men's Premier Grade clubs ==
The following 11 Rugby Union Clubs play in the RugbyWA Fortescue Premier Grade.

Est.	Colours	Club	Location	Ground	Premierships*
1948		Associates	Swanbourne	Allen Park	10 (2024)
1893		Cottesloe	Cottesloe	Harvey Field	12 (2021)
1998		Joondalup Brothers	Joondalup	HBF Arena	N/A
1974		Kalamunda	Forrestfield	Hartfield Park	1 (2008)
1934		Nedlands	Nedlands	Charles Court Reserve	16 (2015)
1934		Palmyra	Alfred Cove	Tompkins Park	3 (2023)
1906		Perth Bayswater	Morley	Pat O'Hara Reserve	3 (2007)*
1987		Southern Lions	Success	Success Oval	N/A
1929		UWA	Mount Claremont	UWA Sports Park	5 (2014)
1981		Wanneroo	Kingsway	Kingsway Reserve	1 (2025)
1930		Wests Scarborough	Doubleview	Bennett Park	12 (2022)*

- 1 of the 3 premierships won by Perth Bayswater was won as Perth-Suburbs
- 5 of the 12 premierships won by Wests Scarborough were won as Western Suburbs and 3 of the 12 premierships won by Wests Scarborough as Wests-Scarborough

*"(year)" Denotes the last year they won the premiership.

== Current Women's Premier Grade clubs ==
The Fortescue Women's Premier Grade was instituted in 1995, and comprises seven teams.

The following seven Rugby Union Clubs play in the RugbyWA Fortescue Women's Premier Grade.

Est.	Colours	Club	Location	Ground	Premierships*
1893		Cottesloe	Cottesloe	Harvey Field	7 (2022)
1974		Kalamunda	Forrestfield	Hartfield Park	2 (2023)
1934		Palmyra	Alfred Cove	Tompkins Park	1 (2018)
1987		Southern Lions	Success	Success Oval	N/A
1929		UWA	Mount Claremont	UWA Sports Park	N/A
1981		Wanneroo	Kingsway	Kingsway Reserve	7 (2025)
1930		Wests Scarborough	Doubleview	Bennett Park	N/A

- Perth Bayswater have previously competed in this competition, and are now part of the Women's Community Xs competition. They have 7 previous Premier Grade Premierships.
- Nedlands have previously competed in this competition, having won 7 previous Premierships.

== Men's Premiers ==
Year	Champion
2025	Wanneroo
2024	Associates
2023	Palmyra
2022	Wests Scarborough
2021	Cottesloe
2020	Cottesloe
2019	Cottesloe
2018	Associates
2017	Wests Scarborough
2016	Wests Scarborough
2015	Nedlands
2014	UWA
2013	Nedlands
2012	Associates
2011	UWA
2010	Nedlands
2009	Cottesloe
2008	Kalamunda
2007	Perth Bayswater
2006	Wests Subiaco
2005	Wests Subiaco

Year	Champion
2004	Wests Subiaco
2003	Wests Subiaco
2002	Associates
2001	Cottesloe
2000	Nedlands
1999	Nedlands
1998	Associates
1997	Associates
1996	Perth Bayswater
1995	Nedlands
1994	Nedlands
1993	Nedlands
1992	Cottesloe
1991	Palmyra
1990	Nedlands
1989	Nedlands
1988	Cottesloe
1987	Palmyra
1986	Nedlands
1985	Cottesloe
1984	Cottesloe

Year	Champion
1983	Cottesloe
1982	Cottesloe
1981	Nedlands
1980	Nedlands
1979	Cottesloe
1978	Nedlands
1977	Western Suburbs
1976	Western Suburbs
1975	Western Suburbs
1974	Western Suburbs
1973	Nedlands
1972	UWA
1971	Western Suburbs
1970	Nedlands
1969	Perth Bayswater
1968	UWA
1967	UWA
1966	Associates
1965	Associates
1964	Associates
1963	Associates
