= Shute Shield =

Rugby union competition in Sydney, Australia

- Sport: Rugby union
- Founded: 1874; 152 years ago (Note: The date for the formation of the Southern Rugby Football Union was 1874 and was held by numerous different clubs from Sydney. The first formal season didn't start until 1883. The competition adopted the "Shute Shield" name in 1923.)
- Organising body: New South Wales Rugby Union
- No. of teams: 12
- Country: Australia
- Headquarters: Daceyville, Sydney, New South Wales
- Region: Sydney; Hunter
- Most recent champion: Eastern Suburbs (2026)
- Most titles: Sydney University (33 titles)
- Broadcasters: Stan; Nine Network
- Website: shuteshield.rugby

The Shute Shield, currently known as the Blue Crane Capital Shute Shield, is a semi-professional rugby union competition in the Australian city of Sydney. It is the premier club competition in the state of New South Wales (NSW). Established in 1874, the competition has been known as the Shute Shield since 1923. The naming was after a trophy Sydney University had made in honour of Robert Elliot Shute, a World War I veteran and Sydney University player who died after being tackled during a match in 1922. The trophy was donated to the New South Wales Rugby Football Union (NSWRFU).

== History ==
Club-based football played under rugby rules began in Sydney in 1870 with the founding of the Wallaroo FC. The three earlier clubs founded in Sydney between 1865 to 1868 were under Melbourne rules (Australian rules football).

On 5 June 1874 a meeting of delegates from clubs and schools to form a governing body called the Southern Rugby Football Union (SRFU / now the NSW Rugby Union) was held in Sydney, with those present: Wallaroo, Goulburn, Waratah, Balmain, St. Leonards, The King’s School, Camden College and Newington College. Later meetings in June-July 1874 were attended by Sydney University, Mudgee and Victoria (South Sydney). The SRFU adopted without alteration the playing laws of the Rugby Football Union in England and they came into immediate use before the end of the 1874 season.

Although a governing body had now been formed, there was no centrally controlled competition until many years later. Clubs were given "senior" or "junior" status which could change from season to season.

=== The Sydney Rugby Premiership (1874 to 1899) ===
Initially, a competition was loosely arranged by the SRFU where the clubs, colleges and schools were in charge of organising their own fixture card of matches. This would result in not playing the same teams or the same number of teams. A "Premier Club of the Colony" was declared by the Union at an end of year meeting. It was not necessarily given to the team that had the best results on the field. Results mattered, but other criteria may have also been used. What these were are not known, other than the colleges and schools were not considered to be clubs and were ineligible, apart from Sydney University.

In 1883, the Gardiner Challenge Cup was introduced with a mixture of "senior" and "junior" clubs competing. Foundation clubs included Redfern, Sydney University, Wallaroo, Newtown, Burwood, Oriental, Glebe, Balmain, St. Leonards, Parramatta, Arfoma and Paddington. The first Cup was won by Redfern who were undefeated. At the beginning of the season, a proposal was put to the SRFU to change the rules determining how a game was decided. Prior to the 1883 season, a game was decided by the number of goals scored. The amendment that was successfully passed by the SRFU declared that games would be decided by number of points scored. A try was awarded 2 points, a conversion was 3 points and a goal kicked from the field of play 4 points.

Within a few years of the Gardiner Cup beginning, the Premiership had developed to become a more structured competition with a centralised list of fixtures and rounds. An official ladder was produced and maintained with points given for wins, draws and byes. By the 1890s a finals system was introduced to assist in determining the premiership winner.

In 1892 the SRFU was renamed the NSWRU. In 1897 the NSWRU formed a branch called the Metropolitan Rugby Union (MRU) and given responsibility to manage the Sydney club premiership and related competitions. In 1899 the teams in the Senior (first grade) competition were Buccaneer, Marrickville, Pirates, Parramatta, Randwick, Sydney University and Wallaroo (the latter winning the 1899 premiership).

=== The Sydney District Clubs Competition (1900 to 1914) ===
As early as 1893 it had been suggested to change the current structure of the premiership to a district-based formula. In early 1900, a meeting of the MRU was held and a recommendation to establish district football in the coming season was made. Seven residential-based clubs competed in the inaugural eight-clubs first grade premiership, each with three grades: Balmain, Glebe, Newtown, South Sydney, North Sydney (now Northern Suburbs), Western Suburbs (now West Harbour), Eastern Suburbs and Sydney University (confined to graduates and undergraduates). The first district competition was won by Glebe who were successful in all three grade competitions. The district boundaries in first grade were at times re positioned to accommodate or to dissolve clubs, with new clubs Sydney city (1905 to 1910), Manly and St. George (both added 1906) and Randwick (added 1914).

It was during this period, in 1907, that the supremacy of the Sydney Rugby Premiership was threatened. The imminent arrival of a professional football team from New Zealand sparked heated discussion about professionalism and compensation pay for lost time at work. In August of that year, the NSW Rugby Football League was formed. During the following season, a professional league competition was begun. Over the next few years, players switched across to the professional competition resulting in crowd numbers falling at Union matches.

Despite this, the district competition continued to run, rebuilding its supporter base, until the outbreak of World War 1 with the last season held during 1914. With the outbreak of war, competition was suspended.

=== The Return of the Premiership (1918 to 1922) ===
During the war informal matches between clubs were played, and some districts combined including Glebe-Balmain (now Drummoyne) and Newtown-Eastern Suburbs. At the conclusion of the war, the Sydney Rugby Premiership was recommenced in 1918. With the MRU defunct, club competition was once under the control of the NSWRU, the residential rules were temporarily abandoned, and six clubs were entered: Cambridge, Newtown-Eastern Suburbs, Glebe-Balmain, Manly, Sydney University and YMCA. In 1919 the competition included the return of Northern Suburbs, as well as Newtown (who absorbed Cambridge) and Eastern Suburbs having dissolved their merger. In 1922 an unsuccessful attempt to have South Sydney re-admitted culminated in Randwick gaining admission for 1923.

=== The Shute Shield (est. 1923) ===
The Shute Memorial Shield was struck in honour of the late Robert Elliott Stewart Shute, who died on 6 June 1922, aged 23, following a match at Manly Oval. Shute enlisted in April 1917 and served as a gunner in 30th Battery, Field Artillery A.I.F. during World War One.

On his return to Australia, Shute took up his engineering studies at the University of Sydney and joined the Sydney University rugby club as a front row forward in the first XV. Of Shute's death from a fractured skull and cerebral haemorrhage, the Sydney Morning Herald, Wednesday 7 June 1922 reported:

As a result of injuries received while playing at Manly in the Rugby football match between the team which toured New Zealand and the Next 15, Robert Elliott Shute, a front row forward in the latter team, died at a private hospital at Manly yesterday morning. The accident occurred during the latter portion of the first spell of the match. Shute secured the ball and when tackled fell heavily. He was removed to a private hospital, where it was ascertained that he was suffering from cerebral hemorrhage. Without recovering consciousness he died at 6am. A former pupil of Sydney Grammar School, Shute, who was 23 years of age, was a third year student at Sydney University and he played for the University first fifteen. He served in the AIF for four years.

The university club had the shield made following his death and donated it in 1923 to the NSWRFU to be used as a perpetual trophy for the Sydney first grade competition.

In 1966, the Sydney Rugby Union was formed to administer the running of Sydney rugby including the Shute Shield.

The Shute Shield marked its 100th year in 2022.

=== The NSW Championship ===
In late 1986, the Sydney Rugby Union (SRU) approved a new competition structure for the Shute Shield. The SRU were concerned about the falling number of clubs involved in the lower divisions. The new structure involved distributing all teams in the three competitions evenly across three new divisions with some teams earning the right to play for the premiership in the first division.

The clubs that made up first division were opposed to the new structure and sought the opportunity to form a breakaway competition affiliated directly with the NSWRFU. This resulted in the formation of a 10 club competition called the NSW Championship, while the remaining lower division clubs remained with the SRU Championship. Both competitions ran during the 1987 and 1988 seasons.

For the 1989 season, the NSW Championship clubs returned to the SRU and the Shute Shield.

In 1992, the NSW Rugby Union again took over the administration of the Shute Shield competition. In 2011, the SRU was reformed to take control of the competition once again.

=== Toohey's New Cup and the Australian Rugby Championship ===
From 2002 through 2006 the Toohey's New Cup was run to fill the void between Grade Rugby and Super Rugby in Australia. This became the Sydney Premiership competition, with the Shute Shield becoming the First Grade pre-season competition. However, in 2004 the Shute Shield was awarded to the Second Grade competition.

In 2007 the Toohey's New Cup was merged into the Shute Shield to become the Toohey's New Shute Shield when an attempt at an Australian wide domestic rugby competition, the Australian Rugby Championship, was started. The Australian Rugby Championship only lasted the one season.

== Clubs ==
=== Current clubs ===
Club	Colour	Jersey	Moniker	Region	Established	Joined	Titles	Stadium	Capacity	Notes
Eastern Suburbs			Beasties	Rose Bay (Eastern Suburbs)	1900; 126 years ago	1900	11	Woollahra Oval	5,000	(Note: Competed in the Sydney rugby premiership every season since 1900, apart from when relegated to the 2nd division in 1981 and 1984.)
Eastwood			Woodies	Marsfield (Hills District)	1947; 79 years ago	1947	6	TG Millner Field	5,000	(Note: Promoted to the Sydney rugby premiership in 1947, and competed in the premiership every season since then, apart from when relegated to the 2nd division in 1981. Epping Subbies and Eastwood subbies combined to create Eastwood Rugby.)
Gordon			Highlanders; Stags	Chatswood (North Shore)	1936; 90 years ago	1936	9	Chatswood Oval	9,000	(Note: Not linked to the Gordon club that won the Sydney premiership in 1886. Competed in the Sydney rugby premiership every season since 1936, and never relegated to 2nd division.)
Hunter			Wildfires	Newcastle (Hunter Region) (Note: Location is outside the Sydney-Metro and outer-region area.)	1995; 31 years ago	1995; 2020		Newcastle No.2 Sportsground	5,000	(Note: Played in Sydney rugby premiership as "Newcastle Wildfires" from 1995–1999. Re-admitted as Hunter Wildfires in 2020.)
Manly			Marlins	Manly (Northern Beaches)	1906; 120 years ago	1906	7	Manly Oval	5,000	(Note: Competed in the Sydney rugby premiership every season since 1906, and never relegated to 2nd division.)
Northern Suburbs			Shoremen; Norths	North Sydney (Lower North Shore)	1900; 126 years ago	1900	7	North Sydney Oval	10,000	(Note: Originally formed as North Sydney. Competed in the Sydney rugby premiership every season since 1900, except for 1919 and when relegated to 2nd division from 1982–1989. Changed name to Northern Suburbs in 1928.)
Randwick			Galloping Greens; Wicks	Coogee (Eastern Suburbs)	1882; 144 years ago	1882; 1914	33	Coogee Oval	5,000	(Note: Originally formed in 1882 and played in the Sydney rugby premiership up to the end of the 1899 season, winning 4 premierships. Re-joined Sydney premiership in 1914, but did not play from 1919–22. Played every season since then and never relegated to 2nd division. Has won 29 premierships in post-1900 Sydney rugby premiership.)
Southern Districts			Rebels; Souths	Sylvania Waters (Sutherland Shire)	1989; 37 years ago	1989		Forshaw Park	5,000	(Note: Formed from merger of St. George (founded 1906) and Port Hacking (founded 1957 as North Cronulla SLSC rugby club).)
Sydney University			Students	Camperdown (Inner West)	1863; 163 years ago	1874	42	Sydney University Football Ground	2,500	(Note: Originally formed in 1863 and played in the Sydney rugby premiership from its start in 1874, winning 9 premierships up until the end of the 1899 season. Competed in the Sydney rugby premiership every season since 1900, except for when relegated to 2nd division in 1979 and 1983. Has won 33 premierships in post-1900 Sydney rugby premiership.)
Warringah			Rats	Warriewood (Northern Beaches)	1963; 63 years ago	1971	2	Pittwater Park	6,000	(Note: Formed in 1963 and played in 2nd division from 1964–1970, then promoted to 1st division in 1971. Never relegated to 2nd division.)
West Harbour			Pirates	Concord (Inner West)	1900; 126 years ago	1900; 1966	2	Concord Oval	5,000	(Note: Originally formed as Western Suburbs. Competed in the Sydney rugby premiership every season from 1900 except for 1919, until relegated at the end of 1951. Played in the Sydney Sub-Districts competition (now the NSWSRU competition) from 1952–1961, then joined the 2nd division when it started in 1962. Played in 2nd division from 1962–65, then promoted to 1st division in 1966 and remained in the Sydney rugby premiership since, except for when relegated to 2nd division in 1980. Changed name to West Harbour in 1995.)
Western Sydney			Two Blues	Merrylands (Parramatta)	1879; 147 years ago	1879; 1934	3	Eric Tweedale Stadium	5,000	(Note: Originally formed in 1879 as Cumberland, then played as Parramatta, in the Sydney rugby premiership up until the end of the 1899 season. Re-joined Sydney premiership in 1934 and played every season since. Never relegated to 2nd division. Rebranded as the Western Sydney Two Blues for the 2020 season.)

Shute Shield team locations

=== Former clubs ===
Club	Colour	Moniker	Region	Established	Joined	Notes
Balmain		Watersiders	Balmain	1873; 153 years ago	1874; 1892	(Note: Won premiership (voted as premier club) in 1875. Currently playing in the NSWSRU Jeffrey Cup.)
Balmain District		Watersiders	Balmain	1900; 126 years ago	1900	(Note: Beginning as an offshoot of the Balmain Rugby Football Club in 1900; merged with Glebe to form Glebe-Balmain in 1919.)
Burwood			Burwood	1876; 150 years ago		(Note: Won premiership in 1884.)
Cambridge			Stanmore		1919	
Canberra		Kookaburras; Vikings	Australian Capital Territory	1994; 32 years ago	1995; 2004	(Note: Played in Sydney rugby premiership as Canberra Kookaburras from 1995–1998 and Canberra Vikings from 1999–2000 and 2004–2005. Grand finalists in 1995. Didn't play in Sydney premiership in 2001–2003, when they instead played in and won the Brisbane club premiership all 3 years. Played in the National Rugby Championship from 2014–2019.)
Drummoyne		Dirty Reds	Drummoyne	1919; 107 years ago	1919	(Note: Originally Glebe-Balmain and won 1 premiership under that name. Renamed in 1931 as Drummoyne and won 1 premiership under that name. Played every season in the Sydney rugby premiership from 1919–1978, until relegated to 2nd division, where it played from 1979–1990. Promoted to 1st division in 1991 and played in the premiership from 1991–1994, playing in 1994 as UTS-Drummoyne. Moved to NSWSRU in 1995 and remained there since, currently playing in the NSWSRU First Division competition.)
Glebe		Dirty Reds	Glebe	1900; 126 years ago	1900	(Note: Won 7 premierships from 1900–1914. Merged with Balmain to form Glebe-Balmain in 1919.)
Gordon				1886; 140 years ago	1886	(Note: Won premiership in 1886. Not linked to Gordon club that entered Sydney rugby premiership in 1936 and still exists today. A majority of the players were from New Zealand who had settled in Sydney.)
GPS Old Boys					1921	
Hornsby		Lions	Waitara	1962; 64 years ago	1976	(Note: 1962 when it joined the newly created 2nd division. Promoted to 1st division in 1976, and remained there until relegated to 2nd division after 1978. Promoted back to 1st division for 1981 season, but relegated after that season. Remained in 2nd division until it was dissolved after 1992, although Hornsby unsuccessfully took legal action against the Sydney Rugby Union before the 1992 season seeking promotion at Drummoyne's expense. After the 1992 season, Drummoyne beat Hornsby in playoffs involving all grade teams and a colts' team to remain in 1st division. Hornsby joined the NSWSRU competition in 1993 and remained there until it left to join the Central Coast RU competition in 2015.)
Illawarriors		Warriors	Illawarra	2006; 20 years ago	2007	
Macquarie University			Macquarie Park	1967; 59 years ago	1976	(Note: Established in 1967 and played in the Sub-Districts competition until the club joined 2nd division in 1971, before being promoted to 1st division in 1976. Played in 1st division until relegated to 2nd division after 1978. Played in 2nd division in 1979 but then relegated to 3rd division for the 1980 season, and stayed there until that division was dissolved after 1986. Macquarie Uni then joined the NSWSRU competition in 1987, where it remains, now in the lower divisions.)
Mosman		Whales	Mosman	1893; 133 years ago	1920	
Newtown		Royal Blues; Blue Bags	Newtown	1900; 126 years ago	1900	(Note: Won premierships in 1908 and 1910–11. Played every season in the Sydney rugby premiership from 1900–1921, except for 1919, when a team called Cambridge, based in Newtown, played instead.)
Penrith		Emus	Penrith	1965; 61 years ago	1995; 2020	(Note: Founded in 1965 as Nepean and changed name to Penrith in 1981. Joined Sydney premiership 2nd division in 1966 and played in that division from 1966–1980. Relegated to 3rd division in 1981 and played in that division from 1981–1983. Promoted to 2nd division in 1984 and played in that division from 1984–1992, when the division ended. Joined NSWSRU competition in 1993. Promoted to Sydney rugby premiership in 1995. *Removed from the Sydney premiership early in the 2018 season due to a failure to "meet the standards set for all clubs to compete at the premiership level". Returned in 2020, before being dropped from the competition again ahead of the 2022 season.)
Petersham		Shammies	Camperdown	1883; 143 years ago	1922	
The Pirates			North Sydney	1893; 133 years ago	1893	(Note: Won premiership in 1898, were runners-up in 1897, and won 3 RAS Shields from 1897–1899. Combined with Wallaroo to form North Sydney (now Northern Suburbs) as a district club to enter the Sydney rugby premiership in 1900.)
Police	—N/a				1929	
Port Hacking			Cronulla	1957; 69 years ago	1971	(Note: Formed in 1957 as North Cronulla SLSC rugby club. Joined 2nd division when it started in 1962 and played there from 1962–1970, then promoted to 1st division in 1971. Played in 1st division from 1971–1978, then relegated to 2nd division in 1979 and played in that division from 1979–1982. Promoted to 1st division in 1983 and played in that division from 1983–1985. Relegated in 1986 and played in 2nd division from 1986–1988. Merged with St George to form Southern Districts before 1989 season.)
Redfern		Redferns	Redfern	1883; 143 years ago	1883	(Note: Won premiership (undefeated) in 1883.)
South Sydney		Rabbitohs	Redfern	1900; 126 years ago	1900	(Note: Established in 1900. Won premiership in 1905. Disbanded in 1916.)
St George			St George	1906; 120 years ago	1906	(Note: Formed in 1906 and played in Sydney premiership from 1906-1914 and then again from 1928 onwards, except for when relegated to 2nd division in 1979 and 1985. Merged with Port Hacking to form Southern Districts before 1989 season.)
Sydney District				1905; 121 years ago	1905	(Note: Runners-up in 1906.)
University of New South Wales			Kensington	1949; 77 years ago	1966	(Note: Formed in 1949 and joined the Sydney Sub-Districts competition (now the NSWSRU competition) in 1951. Joined the Sydney premiership 2nd division in 1963 and played in that division from 1963–65. Promoted to 1st division in 1966 and played in that division from 1966–1979. Relegated to 2nd division in 1980 and played in that division from 1980–1992, when 2nd division ended. Moved to NSWSRU in 1993 and remained there since, currently playing in the NSWSRU Second Division competition.)
Wallaroo				1870; 156 years ago	1874	(Note: Won 7 premierships in period from 1876–1899, including the last premiership (1899) before the Sydney rugby premiership became a district competition in 1900. Also won 1 RAS Shield and 1 SCG Trophy. Combined with Pirates to form North Sydney (now Northern Suburbs) as a district club to enter the Sydney rugby premiership in 1900.)
Waratah				1874; 152 years ago	1874	(Note: Won premiership (voted as premier club) in 1874 (first Sydney rugby premiers). Were runners-up in 1876 and 1878.)
YMCA	—N/a				1919; 1923	

== Media coverage ==
From 1957 until 2014, the Australian Broadcasting Corporation had broadcast the Match of the Day from the Shute Shield competition in NSW/ACT every Saturday afternoon and replayed nationally on Tuesday mornings. The ABC ended its 57-year partnership with the competition at the completion of the 2014 season, following the Australian Government's decision to cut funding to the national broadcaster.

On 17 March 2015, Sydney Rugby formally announced that the Seven Network would become the new free-to-air Match of the Day broadcasters of the Shute Shield in NSW, commencing on 21 March on 7TWO showing a match between Eastern Suburbs and Gordon. The Prime Network broadcasts to regional areas of NSW. This agreement has since been renewed, with the current contract running through the 2024 season.

On 9 November 2020, Nine Network confirmed their broadcast deal with Rugby Australia, giving them the rights to the Shute Shield. Beginning in 2021, 4 games a season will be televised live on one of Nine's free-to-air channels. The remainder of the games will be broadcast live on streaming service Stan.

== Competition format ==
The competition format currently involves an 18-week round-robin competition which is followed by a three-week play-off series culminating in a grand final. The playoffs are contested by the top six placed teams following the round-robin. The first week of the play-offs sees 1st play 6th, 2nd play 5th and 3rd play 4th. The lowest two losers are eliminated and the three winners plus the highest ranked loser proceed to week 2 of the play-offs. The two winners from week 2 proceed to the Grand Final in week 3.

== Premiership results ==
- Up until 1886, the premiers were declared by the Union at an end-of-year meeting. It is not clear how the premiership was decided at these meetings.
- From 1886 to 1889, the season consisted of a round of games organised as a round-robin, with the premiership awarded to the team who finished the season at the top of the ladder. However, in 1887 there was a final to decide the premier.
- In 1890 and 1891, there was a final played after a round robin.
- From 1892 to 1898, after the round-robin first round, there were knockout competitions held to determine the winners of the RAS Shield and the SCG Trophy, with the results counting for premiership points and with the premiership awarded to the team who finished the season at the top of the ladder. In 1899 the results of the knockout matches did not count for premiership points.
- From 1900 onwards, the season consisted of either one or two rounds of round-robin games. The premiership was awarded to the team who finished the season at the top of the ladder. After 1907 there was a final played in some years after the round-robin.
- In 1919 and 1920, the premiership returned to the previous structure of a round-robin. Again, the premiership was awarded to the team who finished the season at the top of the ladder.
- From 1921, there was a final played in some years after the round robin.
- From 1932, the premiership was decided by a Grand Final.
- For 1987-88 a NSW Championship existed alongside the Shute Shield. The first grade teams played for the rebel NSW Championship, while the Shield contained clubs from the lower grades.
- In 2000 a challenge shield in the name of Sir Roden Cutler VC was introduced, with the holders to defend it each time they play a 'home' game. It was initially awarded to Eastwood in recognition of their Shute Shield win in 1999.
- From 2002 to 2006, the Shute Shield was awarded for a pre-season competition.

=== The Premier Club of the Colony ===
Season	Premiers	Runners-up
1874	Waratah	
1875	Balmain	
1876	Wallaroo	
1877	Wallaroo	
1878	Wallaroo	
1879	Wallaroo	
1880	Wallaroo	
1881	Sydney University	
1882	Sydney University	

=== The Gardiner Challenge Cup ===
Season	Final			Minor Premiers
Season	Premiers	Score	Runners-up	Minor Premiers
1883	Redfern (Note: Undefeated.)	No final	Sydney University	
1884	Burwood	No final	Sydney University	
1885	Sydney University	No final	Wallaroo	
1886	Gordon	No final	Sydney University	
1887	Sydney University	12-0	Arfoma	Sydney University
1888	Sydney University	No final	Arfoma	
1889	Sydney University	No final	Strathfield	

=== The Royal Agricultural Society Shield & The Sydney Cricket Ground Trophy ===
Season	Final			Minor Premiers	RAS Shield	SCG Trophy
Season	Premiers	Score	Runners-up	Minor Premiers	RAS Shield	SCG Trophy
1890	Sydney University	31-6 (Note: Royal Agricultural Society Final displayed)	Strathfield	Sydney University	Sydney University	
1891	Sydney University	28–8	Zealandia	Sydney University	Sydney University	
1892	Wallaroo	3–0	Sydney University	Wallaroo	Wallaroo	Randwick
1893	Sydney University	3–0	Randwick	Sydney University	Sydney University	Sydney University
1894	Randwick	8–0	Wallaroo	Wallaroo	Randwick	Randwick
1895	Randwick	13–8 (Randwick bt Wallaroo in RAS final)	Sydney University	Randwick	Randwick	Sydney University
1896	Randwick (Note: Randwick did not make the RAS final. However, they remained on the top of the ladder after the games had been run and won.)	9–0 (Wentworth bt Wallaroo in RAS final)	Wentworth	Randwick	Wentworth	Randwick
1897	Randwick	17–6	Pirates	Randwick	Pirates (Note: The Pirates were declared winners of the RAS Shield as Randwick had fielded an illegal player.)	Randwick
1898	Pirates	9–3	Sydney	Wallaroo	Pirates	Randwick
1899	Wallaroo	10–0 (Pirates bt Wallaroo in RAS final)	Randwick	Wallaroo	Pirates	Wallaroo

=== The District Premiership ===
Season	Final			Minor Premiers
Season	Premiers	Score	Runners-up	Minor Premiers
1900	Glebe	No final	Sydney University	Glebe
1901	Glebe; Sydney University (Note: Sydney University and Glebe agreed to not play a final due to an international tour to New Zealand. Both teams were declared joint premiers.)	No final		Sydney University
1902	Western Suburbs	No final	Sydney University	Western Suburbs
1903	Eastern Suburbs	No final	Glebe	Eastern Suburbs
1904	Sydney University	No final	North Sydney	Sydney University
1905	South Sydney	No final	Glebe	South Sydney
1906	Glebe	No final	Sydney District	Glebe
1907	Glebe	13–10	Sydney University	Glebe
1908	Newtown	17–0	Sydney University	Sydney University
1909	Glebe	17–6	South Sydney	Glebe
1910	Newtown	No final	South Sydney	Newtown
1911	Newtown	27–10	Sydney University	Sydney University
1912	Glebe	6–5	Western Suburbs	Sydney University
1913	Eastern Suburbs	No final	Glebe	Eastern Suburbs
1914	Glebe	No final	South Sydney	Glebe
1915	No Competition			
1916	No Competition			
1917	No Competition			
1918	No Competition			
1919	Sydney University	No final	Glebe-Balmain	Sydney University
1920	Sydney University	No final	Eastern Suburbs	Sydney University
1921	Eastern Suburbs	9–6	Manly	Manly
1922	Manly	6–6	Glebe-Balmain	Manly

=== The Shute Shield ===
Season	Final			Minor Premiers	Grand final venue	Crowd
Season	Premiers	Score	Runners-up	Minor Premiers	Grand final venue	Crowd
1923	Sydney University	23–14	Glebe-Balmain	Glebe-Balmain		
1924	Sydney University	18–0	Western Suburbs	Western Suburbs		
1925	Glebe-Balmain	No final	Western Suburbs	Glebe-Balmain		
1926	Sydney University	19–15	Randwick	Randwick		
1927	Sydney University	No final	YMCA Sydney	Sydney University		
1928	Sydney University	38–11	YMCA Sydney	YMCA Sydney		
1929	Western Suburbs	18–9	Northern Suburbs	Northern Suburbs		
1930	Randwick	No final	Glebe-Balmain	Randwick		
1931	Eastern Suburbs	16–9	Manly	Manly		
1932	Manly	12–9	Drummoyne	Manly		
1933	Northern Suburbs	8–6	Manly	Manly	Sydney Cricket Ground	
1934	Randwick	13–12	Manly	Randwick	Sydney Cricket Ground	
1935	Northern Suburbs	22–5	Manly	Manly	North Sydney Oval	
1936	Drummoyne	19–18	Sydney University	Randwick	North Sydney Oval	
1937	Sydney University	14–3	Western Suburbs	Western Suburbs		
1938	Randwick	26–12	Western Suburbs	Randwick		
1939	Sydney University	25–17	Randwick	Gordon	North Sydney Oval	
1940	Randwick	20–10	Manly	Randwick		
1941	Eastern Suburbs	9–6	Sydney University	Eastern Suburbs		
1942	Manly	22–6	Sydney University	Sydney University	North Sydney Oval	
1943	Manly	5–0	Eastern Suburbs	Manly		
1944	Eastern Suburbs	7–3	Sydney University	Randwick	North Sydney Oval	
1945	Sydney University	11–3	Parramatta	Randwick	North Sydney Oval	
1946	Eastern Suburbs	23–12	Randwick	Randwick		
1947	Eastern Suburbs	32–6	Manly	Manly		
1948	Randwick	27–14	Manly	Randwick		
1949	Gordon	12–3	Sydney University	Gordon		
1950	Manly	21–15	Gordon	Gordon	North Sydney Oval	10,000
1951	Sydney University	22–16	Eastern Suburbs	Sydney University		
1952	Gordon	19–6	Manly	Gordon		
1953	Sydney University	29–6	Eastern Suburbs	Eastern Suburbs		
1954	Sydney University	22–17	St. George	St. George		
1955	Sydney University	21–8	Gordon	Gordon		
1956	Gordon	13–11	St. George	Gordon		
1957	St. George	21–3	Gordon	Gordon		
1958	Gordon	13–3	Manly	Manly; Gordon (Joint Minor Premiers)		
1959	Randwick	16–0	Northern Suburbs	Randwick		
1960	Northern Suburbs	21–3	Manly	Northern Suburbs	Sydney Sports Ground	
1961	Sydney University	6–0	Drummoyne	St. George	Sydney Sports Ground	7,241
1962	Sydney University	14–0	Randwick	Sydney University	Sydney Sports Ground	6,213
1963	Northern Suburbs	21–12	Sydney University	Randwick	Sydney Sports Ground	
1964	Northern Suburbs	27–13	Sydney University	Drummoyne		
1965	Randwick	26–5	Northern Suburbs	Sydney University		
1966	Randwick	30–11	Eastwood	Randwick		
1967	Randwick	19–16	Gordon	Randwick		
1968	Sydney University	22–6	Manly	Sydney University		
1969	Eastern Suburbs	16–12	Gordon	Eastern Suburbs		
1970	Sydney University	24–14	Eastern Suburbs	Eastern Suburbs		
1971	Randwick	21–3	Manly	Randwick		
1972	Sydney University	10–6	Gordon	Sydney University		
1973	Randwick	15–12	Western Suburbs	Western Suburbs		
1974	Randwick	10–9	Parramatta	Parramatta		
1975	Northern Suburbs	9–6	Parramatta	Randwick		
1976	Gordon	33–4	Eastwood	Gordon		
1977	Parramatta	17–9	Randwick	Parramatta	Sydney Cricket Ground	10,068
1978	Randwick	22–10	Eastern Suburbs	Randwick	Sydney Sports Ground	9,216
1979	Randwick	34–3	Parramatta	Parramatta	Sydney Sports Ground	
1980	Randwick	41–3	Gordon	Randwick		
1981	Randwick	33–15	Manly	Randwick	Sydney Sports Ground	
1982	Randwick	21–12	Warringah	Manly		
1983	Manly	12–10	Randwick	Randwick		
1984	Randwick	21–9	Parramatta	Warringah		
1985	Parramatta	19–12	Randwick	Randwick		
1986	Parramatta	30–12	Randwick	Randwick		

=== The NSW Championship ===
Season	Final			Minor Premiers	Grand final venue	Crowd
Season	Premiers	Score	Runners-up	Minor Premiers	Grand final venue	Crowd
1987	Randwick	19–16	Warringah	Warringah		
1988	Randwick	26–13	Warringah	Randwick		

=== The Sydney Rugby Premiership ===
Season	Final			Minor Premiers	Grand final venue	Crowd
Season	Premiers	Score	Runners-up	Minor Premiers	Grand final venue	Crowd
1989	Randwick	19–6	Eastwood	Randwick		
1990	Randwick	32–9	Eastern Suburbs	Randwick		
1991	Randwick	28–9	Eastern Suburbs	Randwick	Concord Oval	11,000
1992	Randwick	28–14	Gordon	Gordon		
1993	Gordon	23–19	Warringah	Gordon		
1994	Randwick	36–16	Warringah	Randwick		
1995	Gordon	24–11	Canberra	Gordon		
1996	Randwick	28–6	Warringah	Warringah	Sydney Football Stadium	
1997	Manly	34–19	Eastwood	Manly		
1998	Gordon	40–17	Northern Suburbs	Gordon		
1999	Eastwood	34–17	Sydney University	Sydney University		
2000	Randwick	36–33	Sydney University	Eastern Suburbs	Concord Oval	
2001	Sydney University	27–20	Eastwood	Northern Suburbs	Sydney Football Stadium	12,088
2002	Eastwood	19–15	Sydney University	Eastwood	Sydney Football Stadium	
2003	Eastwood	29–14	Randwick	Eastwood	Sydney Football Stadium	
2004	Randwick	35–22	Eastwood	Randwick	Sydney Football Stadium	12,418
2005	Sydney University	41–5	Eastwood	Sydney University	Pittwater Park	
2006	Sydney University	16–10	Randwick	Randwick	TG Millner Field	
2007	Sydney University	34–11	Eastern Suburbs	Sydney University	Sydney Football Stadium	
2008	Sydney University	45–20	Randwick	Sydney University	Concord Oval	
2009	Sydney University	24–19	Randwick	Sydney University	Sydney Football Stadium	7,312
2010	Sydney University	46–6	Randwick	Eastwood	Concord Oval	5,410
2011	Eastwood	19–16	Sydney University	Eastwood	Concord Oval	7,372
2012	Sydney University	15–14	Southern Districts	Eastwood	Concord Oval	
2013	Sydney University	51–6	Eastwood	Eastwood	Concord Oval	
2014	Eastwood	33–13	Southern Districts	Manly	Concord Oval	
2015	Eastwood	15–12	Manly	Manly	Concord Oval	
2016	Northern Suburbs	28–15	Sydney University	Sydney University	North Sydney Oval	
2017	Warringah	30–25	Northern Suburbs	Manly	North Sydney Oval	
2018	Sydney University	45–12	Warringah	Sydney University	North Sydney Oval	15,500
2019	Sydney University	21–16	Warringah	Sydney University	Western Sydney Stadium	
2020	Gordon	28–8	Eastwood	Gordon	Leichhardt Oval	5,000
2021	Competition cancelled - COVID-19 pandemic					
2022	Sydney University	26–19	Gordon	Northern Suburbs	Leichhardt Oval	
2023	Randwick	17–15	Northern Suburbs	Northern Suburbs	Leichhardt Oval	
2024	Eastern Suburbs	36–35	Northern Suburbs	Eastern Suburbs	Leichhardt Oval	
2025	Warringah	37–24	Eastern Suburbs	Eastern Suburbs	Leichhardt Oval	
2026	Eastern Suburbs	31-15	Warringah	Eastern Suburbs	Leichhardt Oval	

=== Sir Roden Cutler VC Shield (commenced 2000) ===
Arthur Roden Cutler (1916–2002) was awarded the Victoria Cross for gallantry in Syria in 1941 during WWII, knighted in 1965 after many diplomatic postings and is the longest-serving governor in the history of NSW.

Introduced at the beginning of the 2000 season, this trophy honours a great supporter of the game of rugby. The Shield was initially held by Eastwood (1999 premiers) and is defended at each home game by the current holder

Year	Winner/Defender	Round in which Shield was won	Number of successful defences	Notes
2000	Eastwood	0	0	Shute Shield winner 1999
	Southern Districts	1	5	
	Eastwood	12	4+	Holder end 2000
2001	West Harbour			Details to come
2002	Sydney University			Details to come
	Eastern Suburbs			Details to come
2003	Randwick			Details to come
2004	Randwick			Details to come
2005	Sydney University			Details to come
2006	Sydney University			33+ successful defences
2007	Sydney University			
2008	Sydney University			
2009	Sydney University			
2010	Randwick	1	1	
	Eastern Suburbs	3	0	
	Manly	5	1	
	Sydney University	9	6	
2011	Eastwood	2	11	
2012	Eastern Suburbs	4	2	
	Sydney University	10	0	
	Eastwood	11	1	
	Manly	14	1	
	Northern Suburbs	18	2	
2013	Southern Districts	5	1	
	Sydney University	7	6	
2014	Manly	4	17	
2015	Manly			
2016	Sydney University	4	0	
	West Harbour	6	0	
	Randwick	7	1	
	Southern Districts	11	2	
	Randwick	16	0	
	Warringah	18	0	
2017	Northern Suburbs	1	3	
	Randwick	8	2	
	Warringah	13	2	
	Manly	16	1	
2018	Northern Suburbs	2	3	
	Eastern Suburbs	10	1	
	Southern Districts	14	0	
	Sydney University	16	1	
2019	Eastern Suburbs	1	0	
	Warringah	2	7	
2020	Sydney University	1	2	
	Southern Districts	5	0	
	Randwick	6	0	
	Eastwood	7	3	
	Gordon	13	3	
2021	Eastwood	9	4	Short year - COVID-19
2022	Randwick	1	0	
	Manly	3	5	
	Wildfires	15	0	
	Randwick	16	2	
2023	Northern Suburbs	3	1	
	Eastwood	6	2	
	Sydney University	10	1	
	Parramatta	14	0	
	Randwick	16	9	
2024	Eastwood	17	3	
2025	Northern Suburbs	4	5	
	Eastern Suburbs	11	5	

n.b. records are very incomplete (2000–2009) and will be progressively updated

== Individual awards ==
=== Ken Catchpole Medal ===
Year	Player	Team
1981	(Australia) Neale Murphy	Western Suburbs
1982	(Australia) Geoff Richards	Eastern Suburbs
1983	(Australia) Peter Lucas	St. George
1984	(Wales) Richard Moriarty	Western Suburbs
1985	(Australia) Phillip Cox	Manly
1986	(Australia) Peter Lucas	St. George
1986	(United States) David Niu	St. George
1986	(Tonga) Sione Tahaafe	Eastwood
1987	(Australia) Steve Lidbury	Warringah
1988	(Australia) Jim Fewtrell	Warringah
1989	(Australia) Simon Poidevin	Randwick
1990	(Australia) Matt Foldi	Warringah
1991	(Australia) Marty Roebuck	Eastwood
1992	(Australia) Ross Reynolds	Gordon
1993	(Australia) Phil Kearns	Randwick
1994	(Australia) Mark Catchpole	Warringah
1995	(Australia) Nick Harvey	Northern Suburbs
1996	(Australia) Dirk Williams	Eastern Suburbs
1997	(Australia) Adam Leach	Eastwood
1998	(Australia) Mark Catchpole	Sydney University
1999	(Australia) Peter Besseling	Penrith
1999	(Ireland) Keith Gleeson	Northern Suburbs
2000	(New Zealand) Sam Harris	Warringah
2001	(Samoa) Des Tuiavi'i	West Harbour
2002	(Australia) Scott Fava	Eastwood
2003	(Australia) Scott Fava	Eastwood
2004	(Australia) Scott Fava	Eastwood
2005	(Australia) Tim Donnelly	Eastwood
2006	(Australia) Peter Hewat	Manly
2007	(United States) Gavin DeBartolo	Eastern Suburbs
2008	(Australia) Scott Fardy	Warringah
2008	(Brazil) Dave Harvey	Gordon
2009	(Australia) Andrew Smith	Northern Suburbs
2010	(Australia) Brendan McKibbin	Eastern Suburbs
2011	(Brazil) Dave Harvey	Northern Suburbs
2012	(Australia) Hamish Angus	Warringah
2013	(Australia) Hugh Perrett	Eastwood
2014	(Australia) Hamish Angus	Warringah
2015	(Australia) David Horwitz	Randwick
2016	(Australia) Will Miller	Northern Suburbs
2017	(New Zealand) Tayler Adams	West Harbour
2018	(Italy) Adrian Musico	Two Blues
2019	(Australia) Hamish Angus	Warringah
2020	(Australia) Mahe Vailanu	Gordon
2021	Not Awarded	
2022	(Australia) Max Douglas	Manly
2023	(Australia) Michael Icely	Eastwood

=== Fairfax/Herald Cup ===
Year	Player	Team
1949	(Australia) Bill Barry	Manly
1950	(Australia) Alan Cameron	St. George
1951	(Australia) R. Jacobs	Sydney University
1952	(Australia) Brian Johnson	Gordon
1953	(Australia) Boyd Blackburn	Northern Suburbs
1954	(Australia) Alan Cameron	St. George
1955	(Australia) Ray Love	Drummoyne
1956	(Australia) David Emanuel	Eastern Suburbs
1957	(Australia) Don Logan	Gordon
1958	(Australia) Ken Thornett	Randwick
1959	(Australia) Ken Catchpole	Randwick
1960	(Australia) Ken Catchpole	Randwick
1961	(Australia) David Jackson	Eastwood
1962	(Australia) Alan Cameron	St. George
1962	(Australia) Terry Casey	St. George
1963	(Australia) Jim Briggs	Randwick
1964	(Australia) Ivan Mann	Parramatta
1965	(Australia) Jim Briggs	Randwick
1966	(Australia) Bill Harris	UNSW
1966	(Australia) Bruce Battishall	St. George
1967	(Australia) Ken Catchpole	Randwick
1968	(Australia) Peter Crittle	Eastern Suburbs
1969	(Australia) Michael Stynes	Randwick
1970	(Australia) Rex Batterham	Gordon
1971	(Australia) Russell Fairfax	Randwick
1972	(Australia) Ray Price	Parramatta
1973	(Australia) Wayne Florentine	Manly
1974	(Australia) Bruce Buchan	Port Hacking
1975		
1976	(Australia) Ken Bousfield	Western Suburbs
1977	(Australia) Rupert Rosenblum	Sydney University
1978	(Australia) Geoff Richards	Eastern Suburbs
1979	(Australia) Grant Andrews	Warringah
1980	(Australia) Grant Andrews	Warringah
1981	(Australia) Peter Lucas	St. George
1982	(Australia) Geoff Richards	Eastern Suburbs
1983	(Australia) Mick Mathers	Eastwood
1984	(Wales) Richard Moriarty	Western Suburbs
1985	(Australia) Neale Murphy	Western Suburbs
1986	(Australia) Peter Lucas	St. George
1987	(Tonga) Fetaiaki Langi	Western Suburbs

== See also ==
- Australian Club Championship
- List of Australian club rugby union competitions
- New South Wales Rugby Union
- New South Wales Waratahs
- List of oldest rugby union competitions

== Other sources ==
- Collins, Tony (2015). The Oval World: A Global History of Rugby. Bloomsbury Publishing. ISBN 978-1-40883157-1.
