= 1883 Southern Rugby Union season =

1883 Sydney Rugby Premiership
- Duration: May to August
- Teams: 18
- Premiers: Redfern (1st title)
- Runners-up: Sydney University

The 1883 Southern Rugby Union season was the 10th season of the Sydney Rugby Premiership. Twelve clubs competed from May till August 1883. The season culminated in the Premiership, which was won by Redfern, ahead of Sydney University FC and Wallaroo FC. This was the first premiership in which the winner was awarded the Gardiner Cup. Redfern were crowned Premiers at a committee meeting of the Union.

== Teams ==
By the beginning of the season, the Southern Rugby Football Union had 37 clubs signed up as part of the Union.

=== Sydney ===
Out of the 37 affiliated clubs, 24 resided within the Sydney area with 6 representing a school or college. This left 18 clubs based within Sydney, independent of any school. Some of these clubs were considered to be "Senior" Clubs with the others called "Junior" Clubs.

It is not clear whether all clubs were eligible for the Premiership or a select group were. According to the Sydney Club Rugby discussion board on the Green and Gold Rugby website, 12 clubs competed for the Premiership. However, in the Australian Town and Country Journal, they state that these were only the principal clubs. This indicates that more clubs were considered when deciding upon the Premier Club. The Paddington Club was included in the list in the Australian Town and Country Journal, but was not included as a member club of the Union. They may have signed on at a later date.

Club	Colors	Formed	Ground	Captain	Seniority	AGM	Fixtures	AR
Arfoma		prior to 1883	None	unknown				
Balmain		c.1873	None	Henry Creer	Senior Club			
Burwood		c.1876	Burwood Park	W. Robberds	Senior Club			
Carlton		unknown	None	unknown				
Glebe		prior to 1883	None	James Colley				
Newtown		prior to 1883	Macdonaldtown Reserve	unknown				
Oaklands		unknown	None	unknown				
Oriental		prior to 1883	None	unknown				
Parramatta		c.1879	None	unknown				
Paramatta Union		c.1878	None	unknown				
Pyrmont		unknown	None	unknown				
Redfern		24 May 1878	Redfern Ground	George Walker	Senior Club			
Rugby		unknown	None	unknown				
Randwick		c.1882	None	unknown				
St. Leonards		June 1872	The Reserve	unknown				
Sydney University		c.1863	University Ground	Ted Raper	Senior Club			
Wallaroo		19 May 1871	Wallaroo Ground	Jim Brodie	Senior Club			
Wellesley		unknown	None	unknown				

=== Country ===
Club	Colors	Formed	Ground	Captain	Seniority	AGM	Fixtures	AR
Bathurst								
Goulburn				H.C. Baker				
Newcastle								

== Rule Changes ==
The rules were changed at the beginning of the season determining who was the victor in a match. Previously, games were decided by the number of goals scored irrespective of tries scored. The new system involved awarding points to tries and goals with the winner of the match being the team with the greatest number of points. As a result of this change, it was noticed that game tactics had changed with players working towards tries rather than goals. Some lamented this and suggested that the system be improved to encourage more kicking.

== Season summary ==
The 1883 SRFU Sydney Rugby Premiership was the first season to award the Premiers with the Gardiner Cup. This was a trophy sponsored by Mr W Gardiner for a football competition known as a 'challenge cup'. Unfortunately, the Union found it difficult to organise such a competition due to the lack of suitable playing fields and the disorganisation of club engagements. One of the biggest problems with matches was the encroachment of spectators onto the playing field. This would result in games being suspended. Police intervention was sought after to ensure games could continue uninterrupted. At the beginning of the season, the Union was able to arrange for a section of the grounds at Moore Park in the control of the Agricultural Society of NSW to be used for football matches.

The organisation for the Gardiner Cup was still unsettled by 14 June. At a meeting of the Southern Rugby Football Union, a suggestion was made to award the Cup to the Premiers of the season, as decided by the committee of the Union.

Premiers for 1883 were the Redfern Football Club. The first fifteen were undefeated for the season with only 11 points scored against them. Matches included games played against Junior teams. Their second game against Sydney University resulted in their opponents unable to form a team to play against them. President of the club was the Hon. Edmund Barton.

At the time, the Premiership was decided by a committee of the Union. It was not clear how the Union decided upon the Premier club. When the season had concluded, it was suggested that the relative positions of the clubs should not be left up to the allotment of the Union. It was suggested that a set of rules be arranged at the beginning of the season to determine the champion and what was needed to obtain the premiership.

== Ladder ==
=== 1883 Gardiner Cup ===
	Team	Pld	W	D	L	PF	PA	PD
1	Redfern	13	10	3	0	158	11	+147
2	Sydney University	17	11	4	2	188	40	+148
3	Wallaroo	19	8	2	9	136	125	+11
4	Newtown	14	9	2	3	189	72	+117
5	Burwood	12	5	3	4	87	52	+35
6	Oriental	12	8	1	3	101	35	+66
7	Glebe	13	9	1	3	117	39	+78
8	St. Leonards	10	3	1	6	40	40	+0
9	Parramatta	9	5	0	4	94	39	+55
10	Arfoma	13	5	0	8	69	75	-6
11	Paddington	9	4	2	3	28	21	+7

- The ladder shown above only includes the principal clubs competing during the season. Other clubs that may have competed and were eligible for the Premiership are not shown.

== Representative Games ==
=== Intercolonial Matches ===
After the success of the previous season's games, a New South Wales team was sent to Brisbane to compete against a Queensland team in two intercolonial matches. This was the first time that a representative team had been sent by the Southern Rugby Football Union. The first match saw a thrilling game with Queensland snatching the win 12 points to 11. Pratten ran the entire length of the field to score the winning try. At the conclusion of the game, the enthusiastic Queensland crowd carried Pratten from the field. The second match saw New South Wales win the game 13 points to nil surprising the Queensland crowd. The NSW forwards displayed superior power with the team showing superb passing.

3rd New South Wales – Queensland Intercolonial Football Match

15 August 1883

Queensland	12 – 11	New South Wales
Tries: W Shields, T Bond, T Pratten; Goals: W Shields (0/1), H Pritchard (2/2)		Tries: EM Cameron (2), SH Belcher, EJ Raper; Goals: EJ Raper (1/2), EM Cameron (0/2)

Eagle Farm Racecourse
Attendance: 3000

4th New South Wales – Queensland Intercolonial Football Match

23 August 1883

Queensland	0 – 13	New South Wales
		Goals: EM Cameron (1/1)

Eagle Farm Racecourse
Attendance: 3500
Referee: Lea

== Other football codes ==
Match reports and other relevant articles in 1883 newspapers generally did not make an immediately obvious distinction between football codes. Several clubs played Australian Rules Football under the auspices, and in affiliation with, the New South Wales Football Association. In many instances, the code being reported on in newspapers could be determined by tries and touch-downs in Rugby Union and behinds in Australian Rules.

=== Australian Rules Football ===
The following New South Wales clubs played Australian rules football in the 1883 season.

Club	AGM	Fixtures	AR
East Sydney			
Sydney			
Our Boys (Sydney)			
Petersham			
Waratahs			
Northumberland (West Maitland)			
Singleton			
Newcastle			
Wallsend			

The New South Wales Football Association made arrangements for Victorian club, South Melbourne to tour.

	1883 South Melbourne tour of New South Wales
Saturday, 7 July	Sydney 5.17	def. by	South Melbourne 6.16	Association Ground	Report
Tuesday, 10 July	East Sydney 2.6	def. by	South Melbourne 3.13	Association Ground (crowd: 500)	Report
Thursday, 12 July	Combined Team 2.5	def. by	South Melbourne 8.7	Association Ground	Report
Saturday, 14 July	New South Wales 4.6	def. by	South Melbourne 9.15	Association Ground (crowd: 5000)	Report
Tuesday, 17 July	Combined Northern District 5.10	def. by	South Melbourne 6.9	Albion Ground, West Maitland	Report

=== Soccer ===
The following New South Wales clubs played English Association Football (soccer) in the 1883 season.

Club	AGM	Fixtures	AR
Arcadian			
