= 1901 Metropolitan Rugby Union season =

1901 Sydney Rugby Premiership
- Duration: 11 May to 10 August
- Teams: 8
- Premiers: Glebe (2nd title)
- Premiers: Sydney University (10th title)
- Wooden spoon: Balmain (1st spoon)
- Top point-scorer: Harry Blaney (70)
- Top try-scorer: Andrew McDowell (10)

Second Grade
- Number of teams: 8
- Premiers: Sydney University
- Runners-up: Glebe

Third Grade
- Number of teams: 7
- Premiers: Balmain
- Runners-up: Glebe

The 1901 Metropolitan Rugby Union season was the 28th season of the Sydney Rugby Premiership. It was the second season run for clubs that represented a district. Eight clubs (seven representing a district, the remaining club representing Sydney University) competed from May till August 1901. The season culminated in the second district premiership, which was won by Glebe and Sydney University. Both teams had finished the season at the top of the premiership table and as a result were to play a final to determine the Premiership. However, both clubs decided not to play a final resulting in both being declared joint premiers.

== Teams ==
Eight clubs contested the season; seven clubs representing a district and one club representing Sydney University.

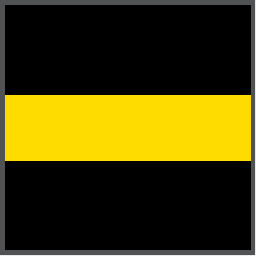
Balmain Formed on 26 March 1900; Ground: Birchgrove Oval; Captain: E Mullet

Eastern Suburbs Formed on 22 March 1900; Ground: Rushcutters Bay Oval; Captain: Percy Macnamara

Glebe Formed on 15 March 1900; Ground: Wentworth Park; Captain: Tom Costello

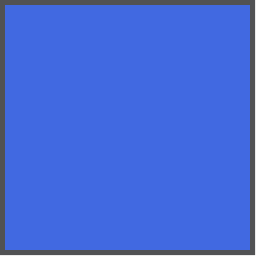
Newtown Formed on 22 March 1900; Captain: Fred Henlen

North Sydney Formed on 23 March 1900; Ground: North Sydney Oval; Captain: Iggy O'Donnell

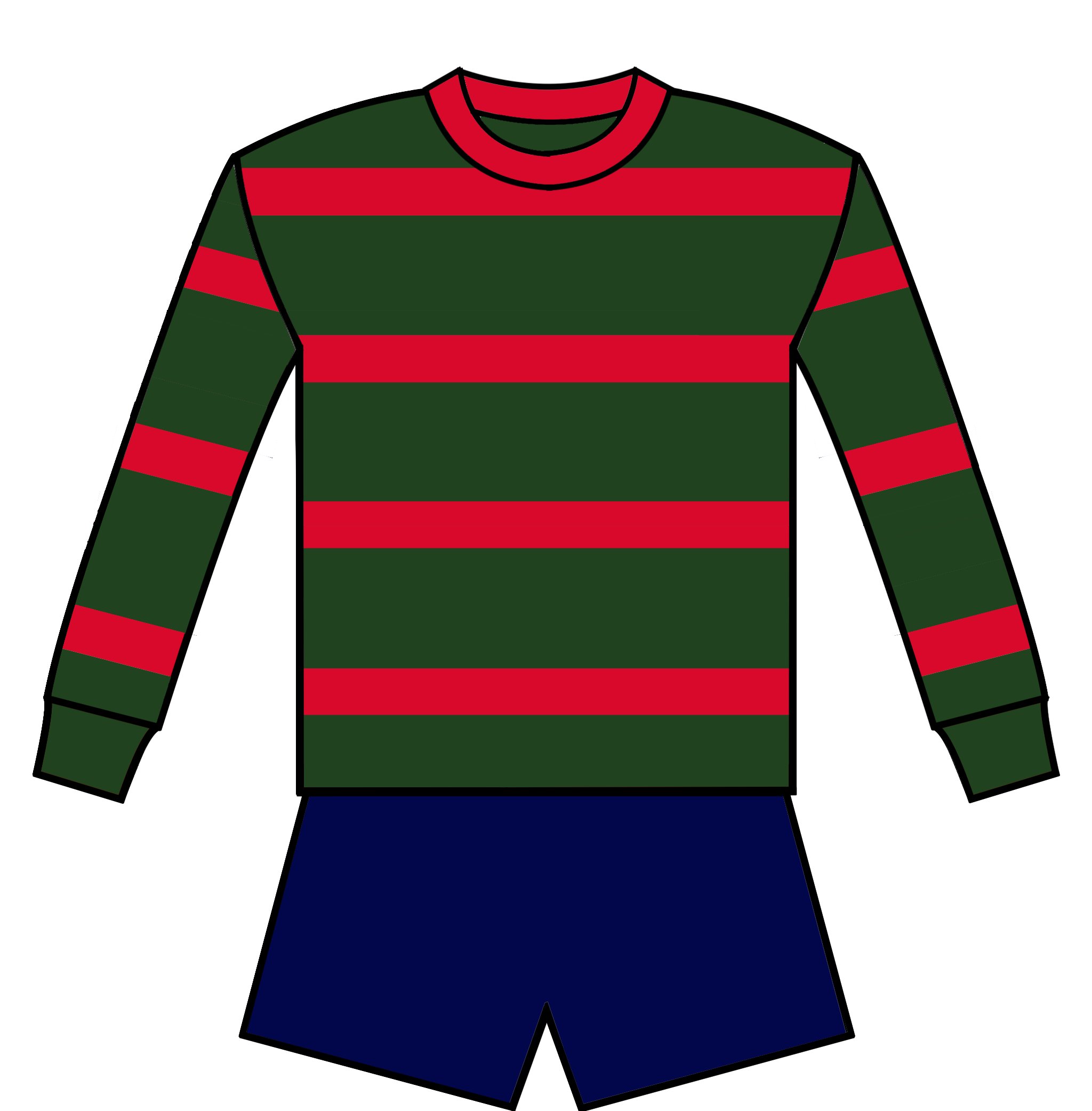
South Sydney Formed on 26 March 1900; Ground: RAS Showground; Captain: J Bourke

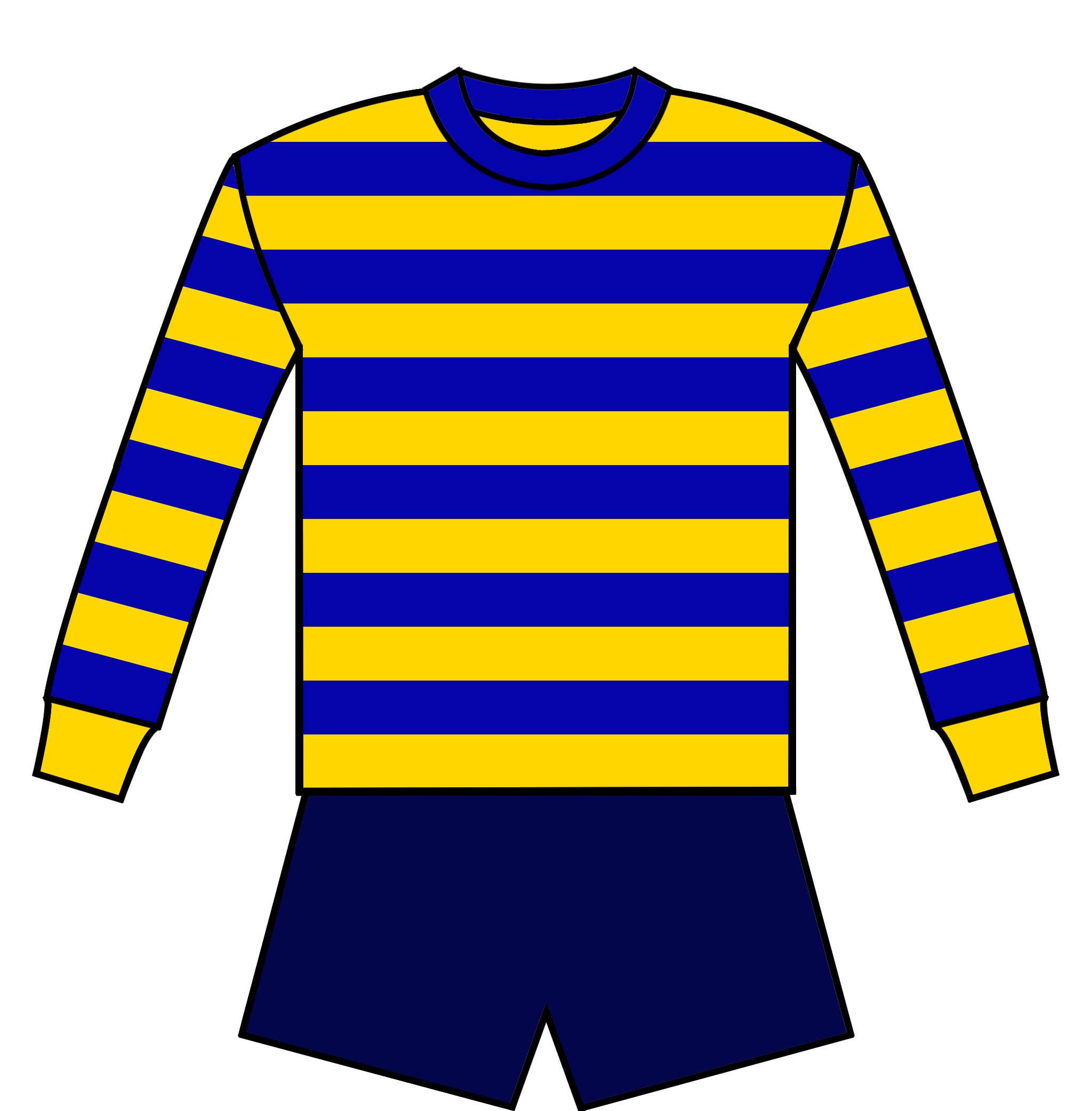
Sydney University Formed on 19 August 1865; Ground: University Oval; Captain: Horace Jones

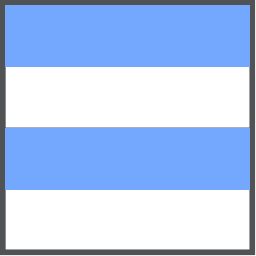
Western Suburbs Formed on 22 March 1900; Captain: William Shortland

== Season summary ==
The 1901 Sydney Rugby Premiership was deemed the greatest season ever seen in Sydney up to that time. Public interest was never before so keen with proceeds for the matches far exceeding previous seasons. The standard of play had improved with a new group of young players joining the senior grade teams and being chosen to play in representative matches.

At the end of the season, the two clubs Glebe and Sydney University finished tied at the top of the table. As per the rules of the period, the two teams were to face each other in a final to determine the premiership. To the disappointment of the public, both clubs decided not to play the final and were thus declared joint premiers. Both clubs had lost key players to the tour of New Zealand.

It was difficult to pick which of the two premiers were the better team. Both teams displayed consistency during the season. University winning 5 games in the first round and 5 in the second round. Together, three-quarters Harry Blaney, Arthur Fisher and Andrew McDowell scored the majority of the points for the "Varsity". Glebe were unbeaten in the second round of games and were considered to have a better forward pack. Unfortunately during the season they had the higher injury toll affecting their back line.

At the conclusion of the season, the football world was shocked by the sudden death of Western Suburbs captain, William Shortland. Shortland had only just returned from the rugby tour of New Zealand on Friday, 13 September. In the early hours of Tuesday, 17 September he succumbed to a, "cold of the kidneys" He was only 26 years of age.

== Ladder ==
	Team	Pld	W	D	L	B	PF	PA	PD	Pts
1	Sydney University	14	10	2	2	0	161	61	+100	22
2	Glebe	14	11	0	3	0	129	66	+63	22
3	South Sydney	14	9	1	4	0	92	95	-3	19
4	Eastern Suburbs	14	8	2	4	0	161	79	+82	18
5	North Sydney	14	4	2	8	0	64	116	-52	10
6	Western Suburbs	14	4	1	9	0	85	122	-37	9
7	Newtown	14	2	3	9	0	79	109	-30	7
8	Balmain	14	2	1	11	0	63	186	-123	5

=== Ladder Progression ===
- Numbers highlighted in blue indicates the team finished first on the ladder in that round.
- Numbers highlighted in red indicates the team finished in last place on the ladder in that round

	Team	1	2	3	4	5	6	7	8	9	10	11	12	13	14
1	Sydney University	2	4	6	8	10	11	11	11	13	14	16	18	20	22
2	Glebe	0	2	2	4	6	6	8	10	12	14	16	18	20	22
3	South Sydney	2	4	6	8	8	8	10	12	14	15	17	17	19	19
4	Eastern Suburbs	2	2	4	6	6	7	9	11	13	14	14	16	16	18
5	North Sydney	0	2	2	2	4	6	6	7	7	8	8	8	8	10
6	Western Suburbs	2	2	2	2	4	6	8	8	8	8	9	9	9	9
7	Newtown	0	0	2	2	2	3	3	4	4	6	7	7	7	7
8	Balmain	0	0	0	0	0	1	1	1	1	1	1	3	5	5

== Statistics ==
=== Points ===
	Player	Pl	T	G	FG	Pts
1	Harry Blaney	14	7	19	2	70
2	Leo Finn	11	5	10	4	53
3	Stanley Wickham	12	3	7	2	36
4	Arthur Fisher	14	9	2	0	31
5	Andrew McDowell	14	10	0	0	30
6	James Joyce	12	1	8	2	28
7	WA Hay	14	1	6	2	27
8	George Roberts	12	8	0	0	24
9	Harold Evers	12	1	5	2	23
10	Joseph McMahon	14	2	4	2	22

=== Tries ===
	Player	Pl	T
1	Andrew McDowell	14	10
2	Arthur Fisher	14	9
3	George Roberts	12	8
4	Harry Blaney	14	7
5	Patrick Higgins	13	6
6	Leo Finn	11	5
7	Stanley Rowley	11	5
8	William Lindsay	12	5
9	Louis D'Alpuget	14	4
10	EC Deering	9	4

== Lower Grades ==
The MRFU also conducted Second Grade and Third Grade competitions this season.

=== Second Grade ===
The eight clubs that were participating in First Grade entered a team for the Second Grade competition. At the end of the regular season games, Glebe and Sydney University finished on the same points at the top of the ladder. In the final, University won 9 points to 6 and were thus declared Premiers. Newtown did not see out the season, withdrawing after two rounds.

=== Third Grade ===
Seven of the First Grade clubs entered a team into the Third Grade competition. The only club missing was Western Suburbs. Balmain finished the season undefeated at the top of the ladder and were declared Premiers.

== Participating Clubs ==
Club	Grade		
Club	1st	2nd	3rd
Balmain District Football Club	Y	Y	Y
Eastern Suburbs District Rugby Football Club	Y	Y	Y
Glebe District Football Club	Y	Y	Y
Newtown District Football Club	Y	Y	Y
North Sydney District Rugby Football Club	Y	Y	Y
South Sydney District Football Club	Y	Y	Y
Sydney University Football Club	Y	Y	Y
Western Suburbs District Rugby Football Club	Y	Y	
