= 1890 Southern Rugby Union season =

1890 Sydney Rugby Premiership
- Duration: 31 May to 30 August
- Teams: 11
- Premiers: Sydney University (7th title)
- Minor Premiers: Sydney University (2nd title)
- Runners-up: Strathfield
- Wooden spoon: Elvira (1st spoon)
- Top point-scorer: Percy Colquhoun (56)
- Top try-scorer: Percy Colquhoun (8)

Junior Badges
- Number of teams: 11
- Premiers: Wentworth
- Runners-up: The Pirates

Union Badges
- Number of teams: 21
- Premiers: Glebe
- Runners-up: Fort Street College

The 1890 Southern Rugby Football Union season was the 17th season of the Sydney Rugby Premiership. This was the first competition for the new Agricultural Society Challenge Cup which was awarded to the winners of the premiership. The football season lasted from May to August. For the fourth season in succession, the Sydney University Football Club were declared premiers with the club remaining undefeated.

== Teams ==
The Agricultural Society Challenge Cup continued to be open to all members of the Southern Rugby Football Union. Also continuing alongside was the Junior Badges for those clubs who chose not to enter the senior competition, and the Union Badges for all remaining clubs and second fifteens of senior or junior clubs. When entries closed on 3 May, 11 teams had entered the senior competition, 11 teams had also entered the Junior Badges and 21 teams had entered the Union Badges.

Despite 1889 being its poorest season to date, Wallaroo FC returned for 1890. New to the senior competition in 1890 was the Sydney club. The club had been formed at the beginning of the season with some people expecting them to "lick" the other teams and come out on top of the table. Out of the four teams that dropped out of the premiership for the new season, only Double Bay survived, deciding to enter the Junior Badges instead. While Strathfield Rovers failed to last the season in 1889, both Newtown and Cammeray folded at the beginning of the current season.

Club	Icon	Formed	Ground	Captain
Arforma		prior to 1883	None	Unknown
Elvira		c.1887	None	Wallace
Parramatta		c.1889	Parramatta Park	J Fraser
Randwick		c.1882	Randwick Reserve	William Macpherson
Rosedale		c.1884	Redfern Oval	James McMahon
Strathfield		1 April 1886	Ashfield Recreation Ground	Henry Braddon
Sydney		c.1890	None	John Gee
Sydney University A		c.1863	University Oval	Leo Neill
Sydney University B		c.1863	University Oval	Unknown
Wallaroo		19 May 1871	None	Fred Weaver
Zealandia		8 April 1889	None	Galloway

== Rule Changes ==
With representative games interfering with the calendar drawn up for the past seasons, a dedicated finals system had not been in place since 1887. For the new season, the Union decided upon the inclusion of a top-4 finals system. After the closing date for entries into the three badge competitions, the Union drew up the seasons games for the weekend between 31 May and 16 August. It was decided that the teams would be ranked according to points with wins worth 4 points and draws 2 points. Byes were counted as wins. In the event of a tie, teams would be ranked first by points against then points scored. The Union decreed that all games played at Moore Park would begin at 3:00pm with games at suburban grounds beginning at 3:15pm. In addition, games would now consist of two halves of no more than 40 minutes with one umpire decided upon by the teams. With a visiting Queensland team playing two matches in July and a Metropolitan-Western Districts game also played that month, it was decided that all club matches would be postponed until the completion of these representative games.

For the coming season, the Agricultural Society of NSW offered a challenge cup to be competed for by the senior clubs. One condition of the offer was that the cup become the property of the club who held the cup for three seasons. They also offered a cheque for purchase of five honour caps to be awarded to the most deserving players of the club that was awarded the cup. The society also requested that all games be played on their ground. The society requested the right to approve the rules and code for the competition. This offer was accepted by the Union with an alteration that not all matches would be played on the Agricultural Ground.

== Season summary ==
The 1890 season was seen as one of the most interesting in recent time. It was believed that due to the presence of competitions for the clubs on three levels, that the state of play had improved with much of the unnecessary roughness stamped out. Crowd interest was increasing with much excitement towards the outcome of the contests. Unfortunately the weather for the matches played during June and July was awful. Rain caused some games to be postponed due to the unsatisfactory state of the grounds and the conditions. As a result, some of the matches were played during mid-week or when the representative matches were being played. However, the same poor weather conditions also interfered with those games as well.

Once again, Sydney University A emerged from the season undefeated and rightful premiers. Throughout the season they displayed themselves to be excellent proponents of the game. Their supremacy over their rivals was seen to be due to their thorough knowledge of the scientific parts of the game. They made a science of passing, an important feature of the game. At the beginning of the season JAK Shaw, the captain of the previous three seasons, retired from football. The club also lost the services of point-scoring master, Paddy Flynn who left the Sydney area. Despite these losses, the team performed unselfishly making it hard to point out individual performances. Percy Colquhoun, Harry Abbott, the Belbridge brothers and Leo Neill were the chief scorers.

For a consecutive year, Strathfield were runners-up to the Varsity. During the regular games, the club lost only to University A and Sydney. In the semi-final against Parramatta, they easily defeated their opponents to progress to the final. Up until this point the club were considered to be equal to the Varsity in performance. However the final saw the eventual premiers walk all over Strathfield to win the match by a large margin. Strathfield's poor performance in the final was disappointing. Robert Lusk, Henry Braddon and Harry Moses played consistently well for the entire season.

The Parramatta Football Club performed well to see themselves in a high position amongst the other senior clubs. The club was in its second year of existence and boasted a light pack in the competition. Playing a fast and effective game, Parramatta displayed stamina. The team were only beaten once by the Varsity and played two draws against Arfoma and Sydney.

Though not as successful as prior seasons, the Arfoma Football Club played well enough to find themselves in the semi-finals. A number of new players were enlisted at the beginning of the season resulting in the overall performance of the team falling short of previous form. Despite this, the Arfoma were only defeated by University A and Strathfield.

== Ladder ==
=== 1890 Agricultural Society Challenge Cup ===
	Team	Pld	W	D	L	B	PF	PA	PD	Pts
1	Sydney University A	10	10	0	0	1	139	24	+115	44
2	Strathfield	10	7	0	3	1	88	91	−3	32
3	Parramatta	9	5	2	2	1	57	32	+25	28
4	Arfoma	10	6	1	3	0	94	45	+49	26
5	Sydney	8	4	2	2	1	75	38	+37	24
6	Wallaroo	8	3	0	5	1	51	55	−4	16
7	Rosedale	9	4	0	5	0	52	61	−9	16
8	Sydney University B	8	2	1	5	1	21	100	−79	14
9	Zealandia	8	2	0	6	1	56	67	−11	12
10	Randwick	8	2	0	6	1	36	107	−71	12
11	Elvira	8	0	0	8	1	9	58	−49	4

=== Ladder Progression ===
	Team	Regular Season									Finals	
	Team	1	2	3	4	5	6	7	8	9	W1	W2
1	Sydney University A	4	8	12	**16**	16	20	28	32	36	40	44
2	Strathfield	0	4	8	12	12	12	20	24	**28**	32	32
3	Parramatta	4	8	12	14	14	18	**22**	26	28	28	
4	Arfoma	4	8	8	12	12	16	24	24	26	26	
5	Sydney	0	0	**4**	6	8	12	16	20	24		
6	Wallaroo	**4**	4	8	8	8	8	16	16	16		
7	Rosedale	4	4	8	12	12	16	16	16	16		
8	Sydney University B	0	0	0	4	6	6	6	**10**	14		
9	Zealandia	4	4	4	4	**8**	8	8	12	12		
10	Randwick	0	4	4	4	4	**8**	8	8	12		
11	Elvira	0	**4**	4	4	4	4	4	4	4		

- Numbers highlighted in blue indicates the team finished first on the ladder in that round.
- Numbers highlighted in green indicates the team finished in the top four on the ladder in that round.
- Numbers highlighted in red indicates the team finished in last place on the ladder in that round.
- Bold numbers indicate the team had the bye for that round.

== Finals ==
For the second time in history, and the first time in three years, a final series was included in the competition. At the conclusion of the main round of games, the teams were ranked according to the number of points they had earned. The top four teams progressed to the semi-finals on the 23 August, with the winners of both matches progressing to the final on 30 August. The semi finals were decided by ballot with both games scheduled to play at the Agricultural Society Ground.

Semi-finals
23 August – Agricultural Ground
Sydney University A	13
Arfoma	3
23 August – Agricultural Ground
Strathfield	18
Parramatta	4

Final
30 August – Agricultural Ground
Sydney University A	31
Strathfield	6

The largest crowd recorded at a football match was present at the ground for the two semi final clashes. The Arfoma-University game held the most interest, with many hoping for the Varsity to experience defeat. After initially leading the match, Arfoma became demoralised when Sydney University increased their efforts. The final score saw the Varsity win 13 points to 3. The second match saw Strathfield defeat Parramatta 18 points to 4. After this result, some were predicting that Strathfield would give University a lot of trouble in the final.

=== Final, 30 August ===
The final match for the inaugural Agricultural Society Challenge Cup was played on 30 August between Sydney University A and Strathfield. Approximately 4000 to 5000 people were in attendance to watch the contest with many predicting Strathfield to cause trouble for the undefeated Varsity. After a short delay, the game began and it wasn't too long before Strathfield scored through the efforts of Harry Moses. University raised their efforts and confined play for a while at the Strathfield end where two unanswered tries were scored. At halftime, the score showed the Varsity leading 8 points to 3. Immediately play began again with no half time rest taken. University maintained their onslaught upon the Strathfield line. The second half was almost entirely one sided with University scoring freely. The Varsity added 5 tries and a goal from the field to lift the score to 31 points to 3. In the last moments of the match Lusk bolted away and scored for Strathfield to bring their final score to 6 points. The final score was a surprise to most in attendance. As was usual, the Varsity players worked together like machinery displaying excellent passing. Percy Colquhoun scored 16 points during the game. Strathfield fumbled the ball and played a messy game. With this win the university maintained their four-year unbeaten run in the Sydney Rugby Premiership.

1890 Agricultural Society Challenge Cup Final

30 August 1890
3:30 pm

Sydney University A	31–6	Strathfield
Tries: JA Wood (2), PB Colquhoun (2), WC Belbridge, M Veech, JP Maloney; Goals: PB Colquhoun (3/5), HP Abbott (0/1), BA Newell (0/1); Drop goals: PB Colquhoun (1/2)	Report	Tries: HC Moses, RB Lusk; Goals: RB Lusk (0/2); Drop goals: RB Lusk (0/2)

Agricultural Society Ground
Attendance: 4000
Referee: AG Allen

== Lower Grades ==
=== Junior Badges ===
For the new season, the Junior Badges followed much of the same format as the senior competition. This was the fourth time that a competition was held for the Junior clubs. After entries closed, the eleven teams were included in a draw that covered the same period as the seniors. Teams were ranked according to points with the top four progressing to the semi-finals. For the competition, fifteen silver medals were offered by Mr AJ Torning to be awarded to the winners of the junior final. At the conclusion of the regular rounds, Wentworth finished at the top of the table with the Pirates, Eurotah and Oxford qualifying for the semi-finals. Both the Pirates and Wentworth won their respective matches to proceed to the final for the Junior Badges. The final saw one of the most exciting and fiercely contest matches on the Agricultural Ground with both teams of equal footing. Wentworth won the match 4 points to 3 to awarded the Junior Badges.

Balmain Ormonde	Double Bay	Eurotah	Oxford	Permanent Artillery	Petersham
The Pirates	Redfern	Summer Hill	Waratah	Wentworth	

=== Union Badges ===
Season 1890 saw the third competition for the Union Badges. As per previous seasons, clubs that chose not to participate in the Senior or Junior competitions and second teams for other clubs could participate. Any player who played in three or more games in the higher badges were not eligible to play in the Union Badges. Despite having 21 teams involved in the competition, the draw saw matches play the same span of weekends as the Senior Badges. When the regular games were completed, Glebe finished at the top of the table with Fort Street College, University 3rd and Clifton qualifying for the semi-finals. In the semi-finals Fort Street College easily defeated Clifton to proceed to the final. Glebe drew with University 3rd in the second semi final. A replay match was organised midweek which was won by Glebe. From the moment that the final began, it was clear that Fort Street were completely outclassed. Glebe defeated Fort Street 26 points to nil to win the badges.

Arfoma 2nd	Burwood	Carlton	Clifton	Eurotah 2nd	Fort Street College
Glebe	Hawkesbury	Manly	The Pirates 2nd	Randwick 2nd	Rosedale 2nd
Rosehill	Stanmore	Strathfield 2nd	Strathfield 3rd	Summer Hill 2nd	Sydney University 2nd
Sydney University 3rd	Wallaroo 2nd	Zealandia 2nd			

== Representative Games ==
=== Intercolonial Matches ===
The month of July saw two Intercolonial Matches played between New South Wales and Queensland on the Association Cricket Ground. The first match, played under fine weather, saw a bit of a one-sided affair. In front of a healthy crowd, the local team defeated the visitors 15 points to 3. The second match only a week later saw disagreeable weather with rain falling almost until the beginning of the match. After almost being called off, the game went ahead with a healthy crowd. The contest was a tight affair with both teams playing a fast a skilful game. Both teams failed to score in the wet a slippery conditions with the match ending in a draw.

17th New South Wales – Queensland Intercolonial Match

19 July 1890
3:30 pm

New South Wales	15–3	Queensland
Tries: W Sutherland (2), RB Lusk; Goals: HY Braddon (1/2), PB Colquhoun (0/1); Drop goals: HY Braddon (1/1)	Report	Tries: HP Abbott; Goals: McCowan (0/1)

Association Cricket Ground
Attendance: 3000
Referee: JWF McManamey

18th New South Wales – Queensland Intercolonial Match

26 July 1890
3:30 pm

New South Wales	0–0	Queensland
	Report

Association Cricket Ground

== Team & Player Records ==
=== Top 10 Point Scorers ===
Pts	Player	T	G	FG
56	Percy Colquhoun	8	10	3
29	Robert Lusk	7	4	0
26	Harry Abbott	6	2	1
22	George Lusk	0	5	3
21	Woods	3	4	1
20	Carr	6	1	0
13	Robert Whiteside	3	0	1
12	Harry Moses	4	0	0
12	William Belbridge	4	0	0
12	Fred Weaver	4	0	0

=== Top 10 Try Scorers ===
T	Player
8	Percy Colquhoun
7	Robert Lusk
6	Harry Abbott
6	Carr
4	Harry Moses
4	William Belbridge
4	Fred Weaver
3	Woods
3	Robert Whiteside
3	William McMurdoe

=== Most points in a match (Individual) ===
Pts	Player	Opponent	Venue	Date	T	G	FG
16	Percy Colquhoun	Strathfield	Agricultural Society Ground	30 August	2	3	1
13	Robert Whiteside	Sydney University B	University Oval	31 May	3	0	1
12	Robert Lusk	Parramatta	Agricultural Society Ground	23 August	2	3	0
11	Percy Colquhoun	Zealandia	Agricultural Society Ground	2 August	3	1	0
11	Robert Lusk	Sydney University B	Ashfield Recreation Ground	2 August	3	1	0

=== Most tries in a match (Individual) ===
T	Player	Opponent	Venue	Date
3	Percy Colquhoun	Zealandia	Agricultural Society Ground	2 August
3	Robert Lusk	Sydney University B	Ashfield Recreation Ground	2 August
3	Robert Whiteside	Sydney University B	University Oval	31 May

- Multiple players scored 2 tries in a match.

=== Most points in a match (Team) ===
Pts	Team	Opponent	Venue	Date
32	Zealandia	Sydney University B	University Oval	31 May
31	Sydney University A	Strathfield	Agricultural Society Ground	30 August
28	Sydney	Randwick	Randwick Reserve	9 August
27	Randwick	Sydney University B	Randwick Reserve	7 June
25	Arfoma	Randwick	Association Cricket Ground	9 July

=== Greatest Winning Margin ===
Pts	Team	Score	Opponent	Venue	Date
32	Zealandia	32–0	Sydney University B	University Oval	31 May
27	Randwick	27–0	Sydney University B	Randwick Reserve	7 June
25	Sydney University A	31–6	Strathfield	Agricultural Society Ground	30 August
25	Sydney	28–3	Randwick	Randwick Reserve	9 August
25	Arfoma	25–0	Randwick	Association Cricket Ground	9 July

- Data is incomplete as news reports were inconsistent with their reporting of matches.
