= 1898 Metropolitan Rugby Union season =

1898 Sydney Rugby Premiership
- Duration: May 14 to August 13
- Teams: 7
- Premiers: Pirates (1st title)
- Minor Premiers: Wallaroo (3rd title)
- Runners-up: Sydney
- Wooden spoon: Paddington (4th spoon)
- Top point-scorer(s): LW Appleby (32)
- Top try-scorer(s): Harry Blaney (8)

First Junior
- Number of teams: 10
- Premiers: Marrickville
- Runners-up: South Sydney

Second Junior
- Number of teams: 9
- Premiers: Glebe
- Runners-up: Waverley

The 1898 Metropolitan Rugby Union season was the 25th season of the Sydney Rugby Premiership. Seven clubs competed from May till August 1898. The season culminated in the premiership, which was won by the Pirates. The Pirates were crowned premiers by virtue of finishing the season on top of the table.

== Teams ==
Seven clubs signed up with the Metropolitan Rugby Football Union to play the Senior Premiership. Lost from last season was the Wentworth Club. Added to the premiership were two new Senior teams from Burwood and Sydney.

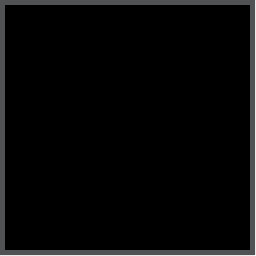
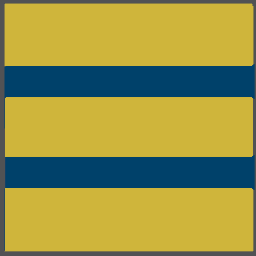
Burwood Formed on 22 March 1898; Captain: Unknown	Paddington Formed c. 1897; Captain: Unknown	Pirates Formed c. 1889; Captain: James Carson
Randwick Formed c. 1882; Ground: Randwick Reserve; Captain: James McMahon	Sydney Formed c. 1898; Captain: William Hardcastle	Sydney University Formed on 19 August 1865; Ground: University Oval; Captain: Harry Wood
Wallaroo Formed c. 1870; Captain: Paddy Lane

== Season summary ==
The early rounds of the 1898 Sydney Rugby Premiership underwent much upheaval. The first round of games began with 7 teams competing. However, by the second round, Burwood had struck trouble forfeiting their first game of the season (in round one they had the bye). Before round three could get underway, the Burwood club had withdrawn from the Premiership and disbanded. Burwood had not played a single game. This caused the Metropolitan Rugby Football Union to reorganise the draw for the season and readjust the points. Byes accumulated to that point were removed and the forfeit against Sydney University scratched from the ladder. Within two weeks, Paddington had also struck trouble and withdrew from the Premiership. The club disbanded soon after. The two remaining games they were scheduled to play resulted in forfeits being handed to the opposing teams. When the finals began for the two trophies, only five teams were still playing. As a result, Sydney received a bye during the first week.

The Pirates Football Club had been in existence since 1889 and had not much success in finals football. Climbing through the junior grades, they consistently missed out on winning the final prize. When they moved into senior football in 1893, they consistently showed moments of brilliance but lacked the consistency of a season. During the last season, they proved themselves second to Randwick and won the Agricultural Society Trophy only after protesting against winners, Randwick, on the grounds of player eligibility. In 1898, the Pirates steadily improved throughout the season. They lost the SCG Trophy semi final, but won their way through magnificently to the Agricultural Society Trophy final. They were worthy winners of the Premiership with all round skill shown across the paddock.

The Sydney Football Club had a tremendously successful first season in senior football. They began the year winning only one out of their first four games. Despite losing their captain to injury, the team won tough matches against strong teams to make their way into the Agricultural Society final. They came up against a classy Pirates team and went down 9 points to 3. Runners-up in their first season boded well for the future.

After spending the last four seasons as premiers, the Randwick Football Club found themselves on the wrong end of crowd favour. They began the season with such great potential but with spasmodic training and injuries to key players, the team lacked the success of previous seasons. Their defence was beside none, with the team allowing only seven tries against them all season. Randwick won the Sydney Cricket Ground Trophy to salvage a tough year.

== Ladder ==
	Team	Pld	W	D	L	B	PF	PA	PD	Pts
1	Pirates	8	5	0	3	1	98	65	+33	12
2	Sydney	8	4	1	3	1	68	66	+2	11
3	Randwick	8	4	2	2	0	58	32	+26	10
4	Sydney University	8	3	2	3	0	62	72	-10	8
5	Wallaroo	7	3	1	3	0	50	46	+4	7
6	Paddington	5	0	0	5	0	8	63	-55	0
7	Burwood	0	0	0	0	0	0	0	0	0

=== Ladder progression ===
- Numbers highlighted in blue indicates the team finished first on the ladder in that round.
- Numbers highlighted in red indicates the team finished in last place on the ladder in that round

	Team	Regular Season						MP	Finals			
	Team	1	2	3	4	5	6	MP	W1	W2	W3	W4
1	Pirates	0	0	2	4	4	6	6	6	8	10	12
2	Sydney	2	2	2	3	3	5	5	7	9	11	11
3	Randwick	2	4	4	5	6	6	6	8	10	10	
4	Sydney University	0	2	2	3	4	4	6	8	8	8	
5	Wallaroo	0	2	2	3	5	7	7	7			
6	Paddington	0	2	0	0	0	0	0				
7	Burwood	2	2									

- Ladder include finals matches.

== Trophy finals ==
=== Finals Week 1, 2 July ===
SCG Trophy semifinals
1	Wallaroo	0
3	Randwick	3
2	Pirates	3
4	University	13
RAS Trophy qualifying round
5	Sydney	Bye

==== Sydney Cricket Ground Trophy ====
The top four teams on the ladder qualified to compete for the Sydney Cricket Ground Trophy. Heavy rain caused the semi-finals to be played under difficult conditions. In the first game, Randwick played what was regarded as their best performance so far in the season. As a result, they beat the more fancied Wallaroo team 3 points to nil. The University-Pirates game was an example of good wet weather football. University scored 10 points to nil in the second half of the game to win the contest 13 points to 3. Both winning teams progressed to the final for the trophy.

==== Agricultural Society Trophy ====
After missing out on playing for the SCG Trophy, the Sydney Football Club still qualified for the Agricultural Society Trophy. As no other teams were still in existence to contend for the trophy, Sydney was given a bye and moved on to the next week of finals.

=== Finals Week 2, 9th, 14 July ===
SCG Trophy final		Rpy
Randwick	3	15
University	3	3
RAS Trophy qualifying round
Wallaroo	5	
Sydney	15	
Pirates	Bye	

==== Sydney Cricket Ground Trophy ====
The largest crowd in club football was in attendance for the final for the trophy on Saturday, 9th. The two teams, University and Randwick, were evenly matched and played an exciting game. The match resulted in a scoreless draw. As a result, the game was replayed on the following Thursday, 14th.

A perfect, warm afternoon saw approximately 3,000 attend the replay final. The game was an easy win for Randwick winning 15 to 3. University failed, unlike previous games against Randwick, to win the ball in the scrum. This resulted in the winning team having plenty of time to create scoring opportunities. The win gave Randwick their fourth SCG Trophy, the third in a row.

==== Agricultural Society Trophy ====
With the Pirates receiving a bye, only one game was played towards the Agricultural Society Trophy on Saturday, 9th. Wallaroo met the young Sydney club at the Agricultural Society Ground. The Sydney forwards controlled the ball in the scrum using dribbling rushes. This resulted in a win to the team 15 points to 5. Some rough play occurred near the end of the game which later saw Wallaroo protest the result on the grounds of incompetence on the part of the referee. The Union dismissed the protest and Wallaroo were eliminated from the competition.

=== Finals Week 3, 6 August ===
RAS Trophy semifinals
Randwick	3
Pirates	6
Sydney	19
University	0

==== Agricultural Society Trophy ====
The premiership was interrupted for a few weeks to play the Intercolonial matches, NSW v. Queensland. As a result, the semi-finals for the Agricultural Society Trophy were not played until Saturday, 6 August. The first semi saw the Premiers, Randwick, defeated by the Pirates 6 points to 3. Overall, the game disappointed with only one try each. A penalty goal gave the Pirates the win with them progressing to the final. The second semi resulted in an astonishing win for Sydney, 19 to nil. The University team played without their entire regular three-quarter line due to a measles epidemic. Sydney were the stronger team, progressing to meet the Pirates in the final.

=== Finals Week 4, 13 August ===
RAS Trophy final
Sydney	3
Pirates	9

==== Agricultural Society Trophy ====
The final was played in wonderful warm weather and attracted a sizeable crowd of 6,000. Both teams, the Pirates and Sydney, played strong games. There was little to differ between the two forward packs. The Pirates had the stronger backs, which assisted in giving them the win, 9 to 3. Once again, both teams scored a try, with the Pirates winning the match with two penalty goals. With this victory, the Pirates won the trophy for the second year. They were also awarded their first Premiership.

== Statistics ==
=== Points ===
	Player	Pl	T	G	FG	Pts
1	LW Appleby	7	0	14	0	32
2	Harry Blaney	8	8	0	0	24
3	Lonnie Spragg	6	4	3	0	18
4	Walsh	9	1	7	0	18
5	William Hardcastle	5	5	0	0	15
6	John Conlon	8	4	0	0	12
7	Rich	5	2	2	0	10
8	Charlie Evans	9	3	0	0	9
9	Fred Henlen	9	3	0	0	9
10	Ernest McMahon	7	3	0	0	9

=== Tries ===
	Player	Pl	T
1	Harry Blaney	8	8
2	William Hardcastle	5	5
3	Lonnie Spragg	6	4
4	John Conlon	8	4
5	Charlie Evans	9	3
6	Fred Henlen	9	3
7	Ernest McMahon	7	3
8	Syd Miller	9	3
9	Rich	5	2
10	Budgett	7	2

- Statistics include finals matches.

== Lower grades ==
The MRFU also conducted three junior competitions: First Juniors, Second Juniors and Third Juniors.

=== First Juniors ===
Nine clubs initially signed up for the First Junior Premiership. These were: Bulwara, Marrickville, Buccaneer, Manly Federal, Adelphi, Rockdale, North Sydney, Newtown and South Sydney. By the time of the first round, Wallaroo II had joined the competition making 10 teams. During the season, both North Sydney and Bulwara withdrew from the competition leaving only 8 teams competing for a spot in the finals. At the conclusion of the regular games, South Sydney, Rockdale, Newtown and Marrickville qualified for the semi-finals. The season ended with Marrickville winning the final against South Sydney 5 points to nil and being declared Premiers.

=== Second Juniors ===
In 1898, the Second Junior Premiership saw 9 teams sign up. These were: Endeavour, Newtown Orlando, Redfern Waratah, Forest Lodge Cambridge, Waverley, Homebush, University II, Glebe and Gladesville. By the end of the regular games, Forest Lodge Cambridge had withdrawn from the competition leaving 8 teams. Redfern Waratah and Glebe were tied at the top of the ladder with 6 wins and a draw each. The two teams faced Waverley and Newtown Orlando in the semi-finals. The final saw Glebe beat Waverley 13 to 5 at the Burwood Cricket Ground. Glebe were declared Premiers with an unbeaten record winning 8 of their matches and drawing 1.

=== Third Juniors ===
The 14 teams that signed up for the Third Junior Premiership were: Arncliffe, Botany, Endeavour II, East Sydney, Marrickville B, Summer Hill Oaklands, Victoria, Granville Royal, Willoughby Federals, Newtown Avenue, Buccaneer II, Forest Lodge Cambridge II, South Sydney B, Alexandria Premier. At the conclusion of the regular games, Botany, Granville Royal, Willoughby Federals and Forest Lodge Cambridge II qualified for the semi-finals. The final was played between Botany and Willoughby Federals which resulted in a scoreless draw. The game was replayed with Botany winning the game and the Premiership.

== Participating clubs ==
Club	Senior Grade	Junior Grade		
Club	Senior Grade	1st	2nd	3rd
Adelphi Football Club		Y		
Alexandria Premier Football Club				Y
Arncliffe Football Club				Y
Botany Football Club				Y
Buccaneer Football Club		Y		Y
Bulwara Football Club		Y		
Burwood Football Club	Y			
East Sydney Football Club				Y
Endeavour Football Club			Y	Y
Forest Lodge Cambridge Football Club			Y	Y
Gladesville Football Club			Y	
Glebe Football Club			Y	
Granville Royal Football Club				Y
Homebush Football Club			Y	
Manly Federal Football Club		Y		
Marrickville Football Club		Y		Y
Newtown Football Club		Y		
Newtown Avenue Football Club				Y
Newtown Orlando Football Club			Y	
North Sydney Football Club		Y		
Paddington Football Club	Y			
Pirates Football Club	Y			
Randwick Football Club	Y			
Redfern Waratah Football Club			Y	
Rockdale Football Club		Y		
South Sydney Football Club		Y		Y
Summer Hill Oaklands Football Club				Y
Sydney Football Club	Y			
Sydney University Football Club	Y		Y	
Victoria Football Club				Y
Wallaroo Football Club	Y	Y		
Waverley Football Club			Y	
Willoughby Federal Football Club				Y
