= 1891 Southern Rugby Union season =

1891 Sydney Rugby Premiership
- Duration: 30 May to 8 August
- Teams: 10

Agricultural Society Challenge Cup
- Premiers: Sydney University A (8th title)
- Minor Premiers: Sydney University A (3rd title)
- Runners-up: Zealandia
- Wooden spoon: Arfoma (1st spoon)
- Top point-scorer: Robert Lusk (36)
- Top try-scorer: Harry Abbott (7)

Junior Badges
- Number of teams: 11
- Premiers: Wentworth
- Runners-up: The Pirates

Second Junior Badges
- Number of teams: 22
- Premiers: Carlton
- Runners-up: Sydney University 2nd

The 1891 Southern Rugby Football Union season was the 18th season of the Sydney Rugby Premiership. This was the second competition for the Agricultural Society Challenge Cup which was awarded to the winners of the premiership. The football season lasted from May to August. The premiership was won for the fifth time in succession by the Sydney University Football Club, who were undefeated once again, winning the final against Zealandia. The Junior Badges saw Wentworth defeat the Pirates for the second year in succession. The Second Junior Badges, previously known as the Union Cup, saw Carlton defeat Sydney University 2nd in the final. A Third Junior Badges was created and won by Randwick Austral, who defeated Roslyn in the final.

== Teams ==
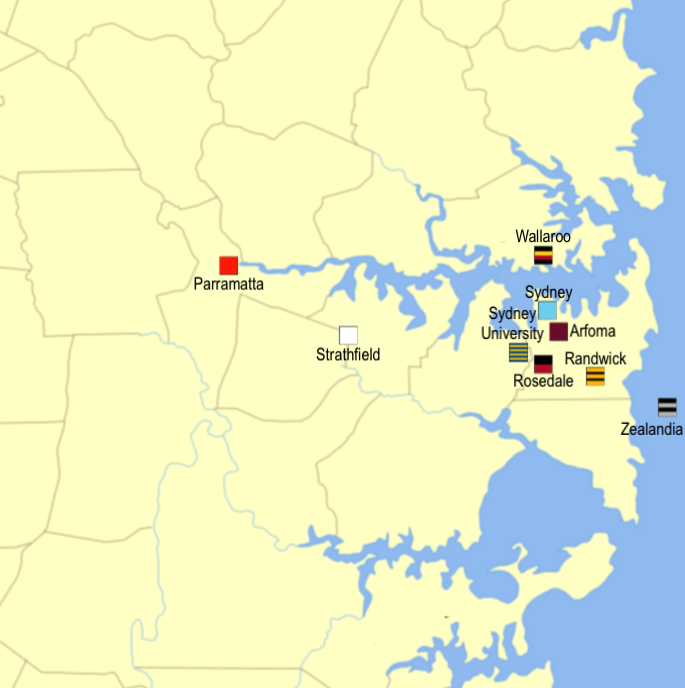
Location of teams playing for the 1891 Agricultural Society Cup.

For the 1891 premiership, 10 teams submitted entries for the senior cup. These teams had all competed in the premiership during the prior season. Of the teams that had participated last year, Elvira failed to survive into the new season. Unfortunately the decision was made by the club to not put together a team as many of their players had moved across to other clubs within the Balmain area.

Club	Icon	Formed	Ground	Captain
Arforma		prior to 1883	None	Albert Sefton
Parramatta		c.1889	Parramatta Park	John Fraser
Randwick		c.1882	Randwick Reserve	William Macpherson
Rosedale		c.1884	Redfern Oval	Unknown
Strathfield		1 April 1886	Ashfield Recreation Ground	Henry Braddon
Sydney		c.1890	None	John Gee
Sydney University A		c.1863	University Oval	Herb Lee
Sydney University B		c.1863	University Oval	Unknown
Wallaroo		19 May 1871	None	Unknown
Zealandia		8 April 1889	None	Unknown

== Rule Changes ==
With the new season, the Union decided to make changes in regards to the number of competitions for junior clubs. In addition to the Senior Cup, Junior Badges and Second Junior Badges (formally the Union Cup) the Union decided to add a Third Junior Badges. Clubs could submit entries to the competition of their choice with second fifteens not allowed to participate in the Junior Badges. The Agricultural Society Cup was to be handed to the winner of the senior competition. For the Junior Badges, AJ Torning supplied silver medals for the winners. Entries closed during the first week in May with the Union writing the draw for each of the four competitions. Games would begin on 30 May with regular season matches finishing on 25 July for the senior clubs and 15 August for the Junior Badges. At the conclusion of the regular matches the top four ranked teams would progress to the semi-finals.

== Season summary ==
During the season, it was seen that a few clubs struggled to field a team. As soon as a club began to encounter a few losses the players became dissatisfied and started to desert the club. Rather than working hard at turning around the performance of the team, these players began to fervently seek places at a winning club. As a result, some clubs became defunct. Calls were made for the Union to step in and stop this behaviour. Victims of this type of behaviour were Rosedale and Arfoma. Both clubs had seen much success in previous seasons. Prior to the premiership games starting, Arfoma were already losing prominent players with some failing to appear at trial matches. Albert Sefton, the club secretary, was doing his best at holding the club together. The same was happening at Rosedale with most of their prominent players having already deserted the club prior to the season. Players James McMahon and Arthur Braund had already signed up with the Sydney club. By the second round of games on 6 June, both clubs were barely existing. Arfoma forfeited their match against Parramatta that caused some poor feeling towards the struggling club. By the following week the club had ceased to exist with Sefton putting on the Randwick colours and seeing out the season with them. Rosedale were able to muster 13 men to play their second round match against Strathfield. Within the first few minutes Strathfield began to score freely causing the Rosedale players to lose heart. Players began to leave the field with Rosedale eventually left with only 9 players to stop their opponents from scoring more points. The game was called after 25 minutes in the favour of Strathfield. Rosedale soon withdrew their senior team from the premiership, releasing their players to join other clubs.

Sydney University had the fortune of receiving three forfeits during the regular games. With both games against Rosedale and Arfoma called off, the Zealandia also failed to muster a team to play the eventual premiers. This gave the Varsity an advantage during the middle of the season. Despite this, the team easily dispatched their opponents in most games. After being on a winning streak since 1887, the Varsity were finally held to a draw. Their match against Strathfield ended in a 3 all draw. This was their first draw since the first round of the 1887 season, ending their winning streak at 41. Despite this, the Varsity were firm favourites entering the final. The team left no doubt of their superiority with a commanding display to take their fifth premiership in as many years.

After winning their first game of the season, a mid-season slump nearly saw the Zealandia club miss out on the finals. However, a brace of wins in the final rounds of the qualifying games saw them in contention for the final spot. Zealandia secured their spot in the finals in a peculiar way. Earlier in the season, the team forfeited their match against University A due to not being able to field the players. This forfeit had seen them receive no points against them on the for and against. With their opponents receiving a large score against them in their games against the Varsity, Zealandia were able to take the fourth position in the finals based on their points difference. The club took advantage of the unfortunate absence of players in the Strathfield team to progress to the final. Once there, Zealandia did not show their best game against the eventual premiers and were beaten comprehensively.

During the off-season, the Strathfield club was most prominent in attempting to encourage players to switch to their club. With the addition of a few prominent players, it was hoped that they would be a match for the dominant University. Unfortunately they met with little success on this front as players refused to change clubs. Despite this, Strathfield performed well during the season, losing only one match prior to the finals. The team displayed promise when they held the dominant University to a 3 all draw. However, the team were missing some vital players in their semi final match against Zealandia, ending their premiership chances.

Wallaroo FC were considered to be the only club to be able to compete with the eventual premiers. It was believed that their defence was almost perfect with only two tries scored against them prior to the final match against University A. The club remained undefeated until they faced the Varsity in the final round of the qualifying matches. A close game saw Wallaroo lose the match 8 points to 3. With the semi-finals decided by ballot, Wallaroo had the poor fortune of meeting the Varsity again the following week. Another tight contest saw the club bow out of the premiership.

== Ladder ==
=== 1891 Agricultural Society Challenge Cup ===
	Team	Pld	W	D	L	PF	PA	PD	Pts
**1**	Sydney University A	11	10	1	0	149	38	+111	42
**2**	Strathfield	10	6	2	2	118	31	+87	28
**3**	Wallaroo	10	6	2	2	71	24	+47	28
**4**	Zealandia	11	6	1	4	62	57	+5	26
5	Sydney	9	5	1	3	56	79	-23	22
6	Randwick	9	4	1	4	51	72	-21	18
7	Parramatta	9	3	0	6	46	104	-58	12
8	Sydney University B	9	3	0	6	24	115	-91	12
9	Rosedale	8	0	0	8	3	30	-27	0
10	Arfoma	8	0	0	8	0	30	-30	0

=== Ladder Progression ===
	Team	Regular Season									Finals	
	Team	1	2	3	4	5	6	7	8	9	W1	W2
1	Sydney University A	4	8	**12**	**16**	**20**	24	28	30	34	38	42
2	Strathfield	4	8	12	14	18	18	22	24	28	28	
3	Wallaroo	4	6	10	12	16	**20**	**24**	28	28	28	
4	Zealandia	4	6	6	6	6	10	14	**18**	**22**	26	26
5	Sydney	0	0	4	6	6	10	**14**	**18**	22		
6	Randwick	4	8	8	10	14	14	14	14	**18**		
7	Parramatta	0	**4**	**8**	8	8	8	8	12	12		
8	Sydney University B	0	0	0	4	**8**	**12**	12	12	12		
9	Rosedale	0	0	0	0	0	0	0	0	0		
10	Arfoma	0	0	0	0	0	0	0	0	0		

- Numbers highlighted in blue indicates the team finished first on the ladder in that round.
- Numbers highlighted in green indicates the team finished in the top four on the ladder in that round.
- Numbers highlighted in red indicates the team finished in last place on the ladder in that round.
- Bold numbers indicate the team had a forfeit for that round.

== Finals ==
The semi finals were arranged by ballot with Sydney University playing against Wallaroo and Zealandia playing against Strathfield. Both matches were held on the Agricultural Society Ground. The match between Strathfield and Zealandia saw the Kiwi's win 16 points to nil. Despite the final scoreline, Strathfield displayed excellent defence for much of the match and with a few less errors the score may have been more favourable towards them. Missing from their team were goal kicking master Robert Lusk, who was still injured from a previous match, and try scoring wizard Harry Moses. James McCausland shone for Zealandia, kicking two goals from the field. Sydney University began with great pace in their match against Wallaroo, causing their opponents much trouble during the first half. Wallaroo were continually required to defend their lines from the fierce attacks of James Moulton, Harry Abbott and Percy Colquhoun. Within the first 15 minutes of the match, University scored all of their points. Tiredness soon set in for the Varsity in the second half which allowed Wallaroo to hold them back from adding to their total. Wallaroo were able to score late in the match to bring the final scoreline to 10 points to 5 in favour of the University.

Semi-finals
1 August - Agricultural Ground
Sydney University A	10
Wallaroo	5
1 August - Agricultural Ground
Zealandia	16
Strathfield	0

Final
8 August - Agricultural Ground
Sydney University A	28
Zealandia	8

=== Final, 8 August ===
A large number of people came out to watch the final between Sydney University and Zealandia at the Agricultural Society Ground. Entering into the match, the Varsity were favourites with some considering it a foregone conclusion. The sunny weather saw the Varsity immediately press their opponents from the kick-off. Within the first twenty minutes, they put up 9 points to nil. Colquhoun of Sydney University played his usual exceptional game. McCausland defended well for the Zealandia, stopping a number of runs. By half time, the University had stretched the scoreline out to 12 points to nil. A humorous and strange thing happened during the early part of the first half. The ball from the Wentworth-Pirates match, which was playing on the adjoining ground, was kicked just beyond the Varsity forwards during a scrum. Some of the Zealandia players made off with the ball and managed to get across the University line with no opposition. In celebrating what they thought was a try, they soon realised that their opponents were pressing their teammates hard with the correct game ball. The crowd were highly entertained by this embarrassing mistake. After changing ends, the Zealandia began to press the University hard with George Lusk managing to kick a goal to put points on the board for his team. Zealandia were fired up as a result and continue to put pressure on the Varsity goal line. However, their work came to no end with the Varsity taking the ball back to their opponents goal line. University got behind the Zealandia line a number of times from this moment, raising the scoreline to 28 points to 4. In the last minutes, McCausland managed to score a goal from the field. Time was called soon after. Sydney University left no doubt as to their superiority as they ran over their opponents with the final score standing at 28 points to 8. Questions were asked as to the worthiness of Zealandia as runner-up with some considering them earning the position through luck.

1891 Agricultural Society Challenge Cup Final

8 August 1891

Sydney University A	28 - 8	Zealandia
Tries: HP Abbott (3), EH Burkitt, BG Sawyer, JC Wood; Goals: JE Moulton 2/3, PB Colquhoun 1/3; Drop goals: JE Moulton 1/1	report	Drop goals: GB Lusk 1/2, JH McCausland 1/1

Agricultural Society Ground
Referee: JWF McManamey

== Lower Grades ==
=== Junior Badges ===
Eleven clubs submitted entries for the Junior Badges with a draw released to include games from 30 May to 15 August. Teams would continue to be ranked by points, with the top four being admitted into the semi-finals to contest for the badges. The Union maintained that the Junior competition would not include second fifteens of teams. Once again, AJ Torning offered silver medals for the winners of the Junior Badges, the offer being accepted by the Union. At the conclusion of the regular season matches, the top three teams finished on the same number of points with the fourth team only two points behind. The semi finals saw Wentworth defeat Burwood 11 points to nil and the Pirates defeat Double Bay by 8 points to nil. With the final being played at the Agricultural Society Ground, the match was very reminiscent of the previous season's with the same two teams playing for the badges. The Pirates were favourites for the final, with the hope they would be able to reverse the result from the previous season. However, Wentworth proved to be the superior club, winning the final and the premiership. The match remained close until late in the second half, when Wentworth scored three unanswered tries. Wentworth were premiers for a second time.

Balmain Ormonde	Burwood	Double Bay	Eurotah	Fort Street College	Glebe
Petersham	The Pirates	Redfern Waratah	Summer Hill	Wentworth	

=== Second Junior Badges ===
Twenty-two clubs submitted entries for the Second Junior Badges, previously known as the Union Badges. Like the Junior Badges, the competition continued to rank teams by points with the top four progressing to the semi-finals. Interestingly, the Rosedale club continued to have a presence in the Second Junior competition despite their senior team pulling out of the Agricultural Cup. At the end of the preliminary matches Randwick 2nd and Carlton finished tied on the top of the table. Both University 2nd and Liverpool finished in the top four to also progress to the semi-finals. The draw for these matches saw Randwick 2nd up against University 2nd at the Agricultural Society Ground and Carlton drawn against Liverpool at Burwood. The Varsity defeated their opponents 13 points to 3 to progress to the finals. The second match saw Carlton defeat Liverpool 8 points to 3. The final was eagerly anticipated with both University and Carlton having played a draw during the preliminary matches. A keenly contested match saw Carlton defeat the Varsity by 10 points to 3.

Carlton	Clifton	Double Bay 2nd	Eurotah 2nd	Fort Street College 2nd	Glebe 2nd	Hawkesbury	Liverpool
Manly	Permanent Artillery	The Pirates 2nd	Randwick 2nd	Rosedale 2nd	Ryde	Stanmore	Strathfield 2nd
Sydney University 2nd	Sydney University 3rd	Wallaroo 2nd	Warringal	Wentworth 2nd	Zealandia 2nd		

=== Third Junior Badges ===
In 1891 it was decided by the Union to create a Third Junior Badges. Twenty-three clubs submitted entries for the new competition. After the regular matches, Surrey and Randwick Austral finished on equal points at the top of the table with Redfern Parkhurst and Roslyn also qualifying for semi finals. The draw for the semi-finals saw Austral and Surrey play against each other on the Agricultural Ground. The match was a tight one which went into extra time with Austral scoring 8 points to Surrey's nil to win the match. The second semi was another stubborn affair with Roslyn defeating Redfern Parkhurst 4 points to 3. Despite expectations for Austral to run away with the match, the final turned out to be a better contest. The match was not a great example of Rugby play, however the final result saw Austral narrowly defeat Roslyn 3 points to nil.

Ardsley	Balmain Ormonde Jr.	Burwood Junior	Glebe Rosetta	Glenmore	Grosvenor	Leichhardt	Manly Waratah
Neutral Bay	Parramatta Union	Petersham Belvidere	Randwick Austral	Randwick Junior	Redfern	Redfern Parkhurst	Roslyn
St. Leonards	Summer Hill Oaklands	Surrey	Waverley	Waverley Albion	Willoughby	Windsor	

== Representative Games ==
=== Intercolonial Matches ===
At the end of the Sydney Rugby Premiership, a contingent of players were sent to Queensland to represent NSW in the Intercolonial matches. Unfortunately, many of the more prominent players were not available for selection, with the team considered to not be the best that could have been put into the field. Those that could not make themselves available did so mostly due to the scheduling of the matches and having to travel to Queensland to play.

The first match saw heavy clouds gather over the ground prior to the beginning of the match. As the game proceeded, the weather turned nasty with heavy rain making the ground muddy and the ball slippery. Queensland were deemed to have the best of the match with the team crossing over for three tries to New South Wales one. The first half saw an even contest with NSW leading into the break 9 points to 3. With the rain making everything slippery, it was believed that the visitors should have had the advantage during the second half. However, the Queensland forwards played brilliantly resulting in the team scoring 6 more points to bring the scoreline level. With better luck, the local team may have won the match. Twice the Queenslanders crossed the visitors line failing to ground the ball and any kicks with the sodden ball did not find their mark. It was obvious that the New South Wales players were tired and out of condition in the second half.

The return match between the two old sparring partners was played a week later. The match saw a decisive win for the Queenslanders with the final score 11 points to nil. However, before the match had begun, controversy was seen with the choice of referee for the match. Mr FC Lea was chosen by the local team to umpire the match, however questions were raised by the visitors in regards to his fairness. An ultimatum was put to the NSW team: accept the umpire chosen or the match would not go ahead. It was believed that the Northern Union did a great disservice to the visitors in insisting their choice be accepted with some suggesting that the NSW team should have stood their ground. The play during the first half was rather even with neither team being able to score. However, the Queenslanders did all of the scoring in the second half. This was done in spite of the winners playing much of the half with a man down. Once again, the visitors tired in the second half.

19th New South Wales - Queensland Intercolonial Match

15 August
3:30 pm

Queensland	9 - 9	New South Wales
Tries: J O'Shea (2), GL Beal; Goals: H Scarr 0/1, WH Beattie 0/2; Drop goals: H Scarr 0/1, G Pratten 0/1	Report	Tries: L Wickham; Goals: JE Moulton 1/1; Drop goals: JE Moulton 1/2, JH McCausland 0/1

Bowen Bridge Ground
Attendance: 3000
Referee: P Small

20th New South Wales - Queensland Intercolonial Match

22 August
3:40 pm

Queensland	11 - 0	New South Wales
Tries: HC Speakman (2), J O'Shea; Goals: A Scott 1/1, G Pratten 0/1, H Scarr 0/1; Drop goals: HC Speakman 0/1, G Pratten 0/1	Report	Drop goals: HP Abbott 0/1, WS Lyons 0/1, EM Bowman 0/1

Bowen Bridge Ground
Attendance: 5000
Referee: FC Lea

== Team & Player Records ==
=== Top 10 Point Scorers ===
Pts	Player	T	G	FG
36	Robert Lusk	4	10	1
31	Harry Abbott	7	1	2
22	Leslie Wickham	6	0	1
22	James Moulton	4	3	1
22	James McCausland	2	0	4
21	Henry Braddon	3	0	3
21	Percy Colquhoun	1	5	2
16	George Lusk	0	2	3
15	William MacPherson	5	0	0
12	Harry Harris	4	0	0

=== Top 10 Try Scorers ===
T	Player
7	Harry Abbott
6	Leslie Wickham
5	William MacPherson
4	Robert Lusk
4	James Moulton
4	Harry Harris
4	H Valentine
4	Joseph Woods
3	Henry Braddon
3	WG Cole

=== Most points in a match (Individual) ===
Pts	Player	Opponent	Venue	Date	T	G	FG
14	Robert Lusk	Arfoma	Agricultural Society Ground	30 May	2	4	0
11	Harry Abbott	Parramatta	Association Cricket Ground	30 May	3	1	0
11	Percy Colquhoun	Zealandia	Agricultural Society Ground	6 June	1	2	1
10	Robert Lusk	Sydney University B	Agricultural Society Ground	13 June	0	5	0
9	Harry Abbott	Zealandia	Agricultural Society Ground	8 August	3	0	0

=== Most tries in a match (Individual) ===
T	Player	Opponent	Venue	Date
3	Harry Abbott	Parramatta	Association Cricket Ground	30 May
3	Harry Abbott	Zealandia	Agricultural Society Ground	8 August

- Multiple players scored 2 tries in a match.

=== Most points in a match (Team) ===
Pts	Team	Opponent	Venue	Date
35	Sydney University A	Zealandia	Agricultural Society Ground	6 June
31	Strathfield	Sydney University B	Agricultural Society Ground	13 June
30	Strathfield	Arfoma	Agricultural Society Ground	30 May
28	Sydney University A	Zealandia	Agricultural Society Ground	8 August
27	Sydney University A	Parramatta	Association Cricket Ground	30 May

=== Greatest Winning Margin ===
Pts	Team	Score	Opponent	Venue	Date
31	Sydney University A	35 - 4	Zealandia	Agricultural Society Ground	6 June
31	Strathfield	31 - 0	Sydney University B	Agricultural Society Ground	13 June
30	Strathfield	30 - 0	Arfoma	Agricultural Society Ground	30 May
21	Sydney University A	27 - 6	Parramatta	Association Cricket Ground	30 May
20	Sydney University A	28 - 8	Zealandia	Agricultural Society Ground	8 August

- Data is incomplete as news reports were inconsistent with their reporting of matches.
