= 1896 NSW Rugby Union season =

1896 Sydney Rugby Premiership
- Duration: 16 May to 8 August
- Teams: 6
- Premiers: Randwick (3rd title)
- Minor Premiers: Randwick (2nd title)
- Runners-up: Wentworth
- Wooden spoon: Paddington (2nd spoon)
- Top point-scorer: William Barrie (31)
- Top try-scorer: William Galloway (7)

First Junior
- Number of teams: 10
- Premiers: Newtown
- Runners-up: Carlton

Second Junior
- Number of teams: 17
- Premiers: Mercantile
- Runners-up: Buccaneer

The 1896 New South Wales Rugby Football Union season was the 23rd season of the Sydney Rugby Premiership. Six clubs competed from May till August 1896. The season culminated in the premiership, which was won by Randwick. Randwick were crowned premiers by virtue of finishing the season on top of the table.

== Teams ==
=== Senior grade ===
Six clubs signed up with the New South Wales Rugby Football Union to play the Senior Premiership. Each of the teams had participated in the premiership previously. At the end of the previous season, both the Balmain Football Club and Paddington Electorate Football Club had withdrawn from the premiership. At the beginning of the new season, a Paddington Football Club was formed which could be considered a new club. However, the Union did not agree and would classify the club as a continuation of the previous one. This would have ramifications for Paddington later in the season.

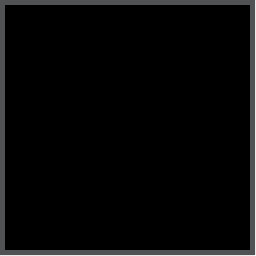
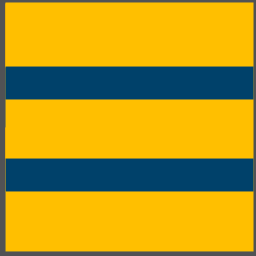
Paddington Formed c.1883 Captain: Unknown	Pirates Formed on 27 March 1889; Captain: James Carson	Randwick Formed c.1882 Ground: Randwick Reserve; Captain: John McMahon
Sydney University Formed c.1863 Ground: University Oval; Captain: Harry Abbott	Wallaroo Formed c.1870 Captain: Paddy Lane	Wentworth Formed c.1892 Captain: Billy Warbrick

== Season summary ==
The 1896 NSWRFU Sydney Rugby Premiers, Randwick, experienced a great year. Until their defeat at the hands of Wentworth in the semifinal for the Agricultural Society Trophy, Randwick were undefeated and had positioned themselves in an unassailable position on the premiership ladder. The club had already won the Association Ground Cup in a closely fought match with old rivals Wallaroo. In 19 games played throughout the entire season (including non-premiership matches), Randwick won 16, drew 1 and lost 2, scoring 249 points with 55 against. A remarkable record.

Much of the success of the Wentworth Football Club can be attributed to their captain Billy Warbrick. At the conclusion of the season the team were second to only Randwick in performance and had successfully won the Agricultural Society Trophy. As organiser, coach and captain, Warbrick's experience and knowledge was vital. Excluding the captain, nobody on the Wentworth team had big reputations or had previously been selected for representative positions. Many of the team were Juniors last season and so were pliable in their captains hands.

During the season, a proposal was put forward at a NSWRFU meeting advocating local football rather than the club football in existence. The belief was that football was losing its popularity and that the quality of play was deteriorating. Advocates indicated how cricket had successfully transitioned to local-based competition. The proposal was put to a vote and lost. However, the idea of local football had now been given birth. In analysing the current season, some of the most reliable and energetic players amongst the Seniors in 1896 were playing in the Junior ranks last season. This was seen as proof that the Senior clubs should be searching amongst the Junior teams for their players. It was even stated that the Sydney Rugby community had enough capable players to sustain 10 good Senior teams.

== Ladder ==
	Team	Pld	W	D	L	B	PF	PA	PD	Pts
1	Randwick	8	7	0	1	0	142	16	+126	14
2	Wentworth	9	7	0	2	0	44	17	+27	14
3	Wallaroo	9	4	1	4	0	113	58	+55	9
4	Sydney University	8	3	1	4	0	53	89	-36	7
5	Pirates	6	0	1	5	0	14	75	-61	1
6	Paddington	6	0	1	5	0	11	122	-111	1

=== Ladder progression ===
- Numbers highlighted in blue indicates the team finished first on the ladder in that round.
- Numbers highlighted in red indicates the team finished in last place on the ladder in that round

	Team	Regular Season					MP	Finals			
	Team	1	2	3	4	5	MP	W1	W2	W3	W4
1	Randwick	2	4	6	8	10	10	12	14	14	
2	Wentworth	0	2	4	6	8	8	8	10	12	14
3	Wallaroo	2	3	3	5	5	5	7	7	9	9
4	Sydney University	2	3	5	5	5	5	5	7	7	
5	Pirates	0	0	0	0	1	1	1	1		
6	Paddington	0	0	0	0	1	1	1	1		

- Ladder include Finals matches.

== Trophy finals ==
=== Finals Week 1, 27 June ===
Association Cup semifinals
1	Randwick	21
4	Sydney University	0
2	Wentworth	3
3	Wallaroo	8

==== Association Ground Cup ====
The top four teams that qualified for the Association Ground Cup were Randwick, Sydney University, Wentworth and Wallaroo. The games were decided by draw. In the first semi, Randwick defeated the 'Varsity, 21 points to nil. It was a convincing win for the premiers with most of their points being scored in the second half. The second semi final saw a much closer game between Wallaroo and Wentworth. Wallaroo had the upper hand throughout the game and proceeded to the final to face Randwick.

=== Finals Week 2, 4 July ===
Association Cup final
Randwick	6
Wallaroo	5
Agricultural Trophy Qualifiers
Wentworth	W
Paddington	F
Sydney University	5
Pirates	3

==== Association Ground Cup ====
A large crowd of 10,000 witnessed one of the most highly anticipated games. The game was a fierce and fast encounter with some players sent from the field. Wallaroo persistently attacked with Randwick holding strong in defence. After half time, the score was 3 points to nil in favour of Randwick. Soon after the second half had begun, Wallaroo took the lead 5 points to 3. However, Randwick soon rectified the result taking the lead once again. From this point to the end of the match, Wallaroo performed attack after attack with Randwick's defence holding firm. The final result gave Randwick their third win in the Cup. With this, Randwick became the permanent holders of the Association Ground Cup.

==== Agricultural Society Trophy ====
Only one game was played for the Agricultural Society Trophy. The University-Pirates game was a fine example of football with "clean passing runs, able kicks, quick intercepting runs, long passes, fine fainting and capital tackling." The Pirates were strengthened by a number of new players who held themselves quite well against the more experienced 'Varsity. At half time, university led 5 points to nil. During the second half, the Pirates scored but missed the conversion which cost them the match. The second game scheduled for the weekend was to be between Wentworth and Paddington. However, the Paddington club, which had been reformed at the beginning of the season, had inherited the past debits of the former club. As these debits were with the NSWRFU, the Union disqualified the club from the competition and awarded Wentworth the win.

=== Finals Week 3, 11 July ===
Agricultural Trophy semifinals
Randwick	0
Wentworth	3
Wallaroo	30
Sydney University	10

==== Agricultural Society Trophy ====
The first semi final for the trophy was played between Randwick and Wentworth. After the previous match against Wallaroo, Randwick had some players who were not at their best due to the intensity of that game. Wentworth, on the other hand, had done everything possible to ensure it had its best players available and were well prepared for the game. As a result, Randwick failed to play the majority of the game with their usual "dash" and met strong defence from Wentworth. A single try was scored by the Wentworth Captain to win the match. The second semi final saw Wallaroo play Sydney University. A high scoring match saw points added rapidly. Wallaroo won the game 30 points to 10.

=== Finals Week 4, 8 August ===
Agricultural Trophy final
Wentworth	9
Wallaroo	0

==== Agricultural Society Trophy ====
In the lead up to the game, it was feared that Wentworth would not be able to put up their best team for the match. Some of the players had been selected to play in the NSW representative team and were unavailable. As a sign of good sportsmanship, the Wallaroo captain PM Lane offered Wentworth to pick any player of their choice to ensure the game could be played. The Wentworth captain, W Warbrick, picked AG Fraser from the Randwick club to play for the team. The game was an "interesting and determined" one with nothing of excitement to note. Wentworth won with ease with Wallaroo lacking in aggressive tendencies. The defeated team never looked likely to score.

== Statistics ==
=== Points ===
	Player	Pl	T	G	FG	Pts
1	William Barrie	8	2	5	3	31
2	Allan Scott	8	1	8	1	23
3	William Galloway	8	7	0	0	21
4	Ernest Roberts	8	6	0	0	18
5	Frank Row	8	0	9	0	18
6	Percy Colquhoun	8	2	3	1	16
7	O Riley	6	3	0	1	13
8	HB Rowlands	3	0	6	0	13
9	Wooller	8	0	3	1	13
10	Fred Henlen	8	4	0	0	12

=== Tries ===
	Player	Pl	T
1	William Galloway	8	7
2	Ernest Roberts	8	6
3	Fred Henlen	8	4
4	Ernest Martineer	7	4
5	O Riley	6	3
6	Charlie Winn	8	3
7	Harry Abbott	3	3
8	W Harris	1	3
9	Alex Kelly	7	3
10	AR Manchee	8	3

- Statistics include Finals matches.

== Lower grades ==
The NSWRFU held four junior premierships in conjunction to the main senior competition. All four grades were well represented with some clubs entering multiple teams across the four competitions.

=== First Juniors ===
Initially, twelve clubs signed up for the First Junior Premiership. These were: Marrickville, Newtown, Paddington Borough, Strathfield, Summer Hill Oaklands, University II, Balmain A, Leichhardt, Petersham, Carlton, Central Cumberland and Woollahra. Both Petersham and Woollahra dropped out of the premiership before it had begun. When the regular season games had been completed, the following teams qualified for the semi-finals: Carlton, Paddington Boroughs, Leichhardt and Newtown. In the final Carlton played Newtown. Newtown created an upset, winning the match 6 points to 3 to be declared premiers.

=== Second Juniors ===
The Second Junior Premiership saw 17 clubs sign up to compete. These were: Richmond, Hawkesbury College, Wallaroo II, Balmain Junior, Manly Federal, Buccaneer, Oriental, Royal Oak, Federal, Hawkesbury, Shamrock, Homebush, University III, Pioneer, Rockdale, Mercantile and North Sydney. At the conclusion of the regular rounds, eight teams qualified for the finals: Buccaneer, Royal Oak, Homebush, Mercantile, Hawkesbury, North Sydney, Balmain Junior and Rockdale. The final saw Buccaneer play Mercantile. Mercantile won the match 15 points to 5 to be declared premiers.

=== Third Juniors ===
The number of teams entered into the Third Junior Premiership was down compared to the previous season with 13 joining the competition. Clubs that signed up were: Ashfield, Glebe, Waverley, Pirates II, Willoughby Oaks, Ryde, Double Bay, Newtown Cambridge, Redfern Waratah, Balmain B, Adelphi, Hunter's Hill and Redfern Norwood. When the regular rounds were completed, the following teams qualified for the semi-finals: Glebe, Adelphi, Redfern Waratah and Pirates II. The final saw Glebe play Redfern Waratah. Redfern Waratah won the match 3 points to nil to be declared premiers.

=== Fourth Juniors ===
Forty clubs signed up to compete in the Fourth Junior Premiership in 1896. Due to the large number of teams entered, four divisions were created with teams allocated to each. In Division A were: Granville Royal, Hawkesbury College II, Hawkesbury Excelsior, St Mary's Union, Ardler, Windsor, Rookwood, Liverpool, Iona and Parramatta Ormonde. Division B teams were: Richmond II, Fort Street College, Chelsea, Woollahra Junior, South Sydney Juniors, Adelphi II, Boy's Brigade, Willoughby Federal, Coogee and Mosman. In Division C were: Imperial, Balmain C, Forest Lodge Cambridge, Carolinas, Rosegrove, Toxteth, Endeavour, Balmain Waratah, Warren and Leichhardt Gladstone. Division D teams were: Redfern Cambridge, Enmore Oaks, Summer Hill Oaklands II, Royal, Petersham II, Epsom, Belvidere, Newtown II, Victoria and Erskineville. When the regular rounds were completed, the following teams qualified for the finals: Parramatta Ormonde, Granville Royal, South Sydney Juniors, Woollahra Junior, Forest Lodge Cambridge, Endeavour, Victoria and Newtown II. In the final Woollahra Junior play Newtown II. Woollahra Junior won the match in the dying moments 6 points to 5 to take the premiership.

== Participating Clubs ==
Club	Senior Grade	Junior Grade			
Club	Senior Grade	1st	2nd	3rd	4th
Adelphi Football Club				Y	Y
Adler Football Club					Y
Ashfield Football Club				Y	
Balmain Rugby Football Club		Y		Y	Y
Balmain Junior Football Club			Y		
Balmain Waratah Football Club					Y
Belvidere Football Club					Y
Boy's Brigade Football Club					Y
Buccaneer Football Club			Y		
Carlton Football Club		Y			
Carolina Football Club					Y
Central Cumberland Football Club		Y			
Chelsea Football Club					Y
Coogee Football Club					Y
Double Bay Football Club				Y	
Endeavour Football Club					Y
Enmore Oaks Football Club					Y
Epsom Football Club					Y
Erskineville Football Club					Y
Federal Football Club			Y		
Forest Lodge Cambridge Football Club					Y
Fort Street College Football Club					Y
Glebe Football Club				Y	
Granville Royal Football Club					Y
Hawkesbury Football Club			Y		
Hawkesbury Agricultural College Football Club			Y		Y
Hawkesbury Excelsior Football Club					Y
Homebush Football Club			Y		
Hunters Hill Rugby Club				Y	
Imperial Football Club					Y
Iona Football Club					Y
Leichhardt Football Club		Y			
Leichhardt Gladstone Football Club					Y
Liverpool Football Club					Y
Manly Federal Football Club			Y		
Marrickville Football Club		Y			
Mercantile Football Club			Y		
Mosman Rugby Club					Y
Newtown Football Club		Y			Y
Newtown Cambridge Football Club				Y	
North Sydney Football Club			Y		
Oriental Football Club			Y		
Paddington Borough Football Club		Y			
Paddington Football Club	Y				
Parramatta Ormonde Football Club					Y
Petersham Rugby Football Club		Y			Y
Pioneer Football Club			Y		
Pirates Football Club	Y			Y	
Randwick Football Club	Y				
Redfern Cambridge Football Club					Y
Redfern Norwood Football Club				Y	
Redfern Waratah Football Club				Y	
Richmond Football Club			Y		Y
Rockdale Football Club			Y		
Rookwood Football Club					Y
Rosegrove Football Club					Y
Royal Football Club					Y
Royal Oaks Football Club			Y		
Ryde Football Club				Y	
Shamrock Football Club			Y		
South Sydney Juniors Football Club					Y
St Mary's Union Club					Y
Strathfield Football Club		Y			
Summer Hill Oaklands Football Club		Y			Y
Sydney University Football Club	Y	Y	Y		
Toxteth Football Club					Y
Victoria Football Club					Y
Wallaroo Football Club	Y		Y		
Warren Football Club					Y
Waverley Football Club				Y	
Wentworth Football Club	Y				
Willoughby Federal Football Club					Y
Willoughby Oaks Football Club				Y	
Windsor Football Club					Y
Woollahra Football Club		Y			
Woollahra Junior Football Club					Y
