= 1897 Metropolitan Rugby Union season =

1897 Sydney Rugby Premiership
- Duration: 8 May to 11 September
- Teams: 6
- Premiers: Randwick (4th title)
- Minor Premiers: Randwick (3rd title)
- Runners-up: Pirates
- Wooden spoon: Paddington (3rd spoon)
- Top point-scorer(s): Percy Macnamara (24)
- Top try-scorer(s): William Shortland (4)

First Junior
- Number of teams: 10
- Premiers: Homebush
- Runners-up: Buccaneer

Second Junior
- Number of teams: 13
- Premiers: Manly Federal
- Runners-up: Redfern Waratah

The 1897 Metropolitan Rugby Union season was the 24th season of the Sydney Rugby Premiership. Six clubs competed from May till September 1897. The season culminated in the premiership, which was won by Randwick who were undefeated during the season. Randwick were crowned premiers by virtue of finishing the season on top of the table. This was the first premiership run under the new Metropolitan Rugby Football Union.

== Teams ==
Six clubs signed up with the Metropolitan Rugby Football Union to play the Senior Premiership. Each of the teams had participated in the premiership previously. The Paddington club had been disqualified from the competition at the end of the previous season due to unpaid Union fees. As a result, the club was newly formed at the beginning of the season. Paddington kept the identity and the history of the former club.

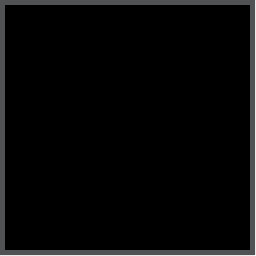
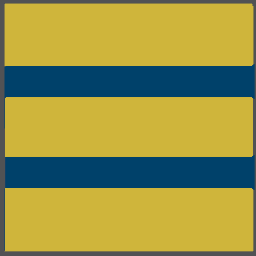
Paddington Formed c.1883 Captain: Unknown	Pirates Formed on 27 March 1889; Captain: James Carson	Randwick Formed c.1882 Ground: Randwick Reserve; Captain: Allen Scott
Sydney University Formed c.1863 Ground: University Oval; Captain: Harry Wood	Wallaroo Formed c.1870 Captain: Paddy Lane	Wentworth Formed c.1892 Captain: Billy Warbrick

== Season summary ==
Early in the 1897, at the annual meeting for the New South Wales Rugby Football Union, a motion was passed to form a branch union to take over the running of club football. This new union was named the Metropolitan Rugby Football Union.

There was some discussion about the quality of play that football was producing in 1897. Some quarters declared that the standard had deteriorated over the past few seasons. However, it was suggested by others in the media that football was moving from individual heroics to team brilliance. The addition of talented players from the Junior ranks was welcomed with many of these players selected for representative honours.

The 1897 Sydney Rugby Premiership saw Randwick Football Club present its best performance to take all before it. The club were undefeated in all games during the season and won all three main awards, the Sydney Cricket Ground Trophy, Agricultural Society Trophy and the Premiership. Unfortunately, the Agricultural Society Trophy was stripped from the club and awarded to their opponents due to a technicality. Before playing the semi-final, Randwick requested to allow the New Zealander, Tom Pauling, to play for the team. The Union allowed him to play but, due to a protest by the Pirates after the completion of the final, the decision was revised. With the new decision, the Pirates were awarded the Agricultural Society Trophy.

After the introduction of new Juniors to the team, the Pirates Football Club transformed their season. During the previous season, the team failed to win a single game and began the new year with a pair of losses. With the arrival of Conlon, Boyd, Evers, McMahon, Ellis, Warman and Baird the team displayed improved form only slightly below that of the Premiers. The team were present in both trophy finals and finished the season runners-up. After the protest against Randwick was upheld, the Pirates were awarded with the Agricultural Society Trophy. Hopes were high for the future.

The two older clubs, Sydney University and Wallaroo, experienced less than their usual success during the season. Both teams were in the middle of a rebuilding phase, with older and more experienced players retiring from the game. New young blood was filtering into the ranks with hope that the clubs would soon be back to their high-class best. The 'Varsity displayed an upturn in their performance from previous seasons, giving the club promise for the future. Victory over the Pirates and an excellent game against the Premiers were the highlights of the season. Wallaroo experienced their worst season for a decade. This could be attributed to the injuries to key players, Row and Kelly. The team won only two games during the season and were unable to recruit Juniors of merit. With an infusion of new blood mixing with the sound, experienced players, it is believed that Wallaroo could achieve success once again.

== Ladder ==
	Team	Pld	W	D	L	B	PF	PA	PD	Pts
1	Randwick	9	9	0	0	0	104	38	+66	18
2	Pirates	9	5	0	4	0	88	70	+18	10
3	Wallaroo	7	2	0	5	1	45	58	-13	6
4	Sydney University	7	3	0	4	0	44	69	-25	6
5	Wentworth	7	3	0	4	0	58	55	+3	6
6	Paddington	5	0	0	5	0	7	56	-49	0

=== Ladder progression ===
- Numbers highlighted in blue indicates the team finished first on the ladder in that round.
- Numbers highlighted in red indicates the team finished in last place on the ladder in that round

	Team	Regular Season					MP	Finals			
	Team	1	2	3	4	5	MP	W1	W2	W3	W4
1	Randwick	2	4	6	8	10	10	12	14	16	18
2	Pirates	0	0	2	4	6	6	8	8	10	10
3	Wallaroo	2	2	2	2	4	4	4	6	6	
4	Sydney University	0	2	2	4	4	4	4	6	6	
5	Wentworth	2	4	6	6	6	6	6	6		
6	Paddington	0	0	0	0	0	0				

- Ladder include Finals matches.

== Trophy finals ==
=== Finals Week 1, 19 June & 17 July ===
SCG Trophy semi-finals			Rpy
1	Randwick	17	
4	Wallaroo	3	
2	Wentworth	3	6
3	Pirates	3	17

==== Sydney Cricket Ground Trophy ====
The top four teams on the ladder qualified to compete for the Sydney Cricket Ground Trophy. Games were decided by draw with Wentworth and the Pirates facing off for the second successive week. This game ended with a 3 all draw and was replayed on 17 July. In the replay, the Pirates won easily 17 points to 6. In the second semi, Randwick had the better team resulting in a loss for Wallaroo 17 to 3.

==== Agricultural Society Trophy ====
After missing out on playing for the SCG Trophy, the Sydney University Football Club still qualified for the Agricultural Society Trophy. As no other teams were still in existence to contend for the trophy, University proceeded directly to the next week of finals.

=== Finals Week 2, 24 July & 7 August ===
SCG Trophy final		Rpy
Randwick	0	6
Pirates	0	3
RAS Trophy qualifying round
Wentworth	3	
University	17	
Wallaroo	Bye	

==== Sydney Cricket Ground Trophy ====
There was much anticipation for the final, as many believed that the Pirates were the only club to end Randwick's unbeaten run. With the game played on a wet and muddy day, the result was almost what the crowd wanted. The ground was in such poor condition that the referee took a turn in the mud and humorously wore a muddy stain to show for it. The Pirates played a stronger wet-weather game and were able to hold Randwick to a nil all draw.

The replay final saw similar cold and squally weather. Despite the conditions, the game was commended for its fine display with both teams playing well. The score was 3 all at half time with Randwick eventually coming away as winners. The fact that Randwick did not score more points was due to the excellent defence of their opponents. Overall, the victors were the better team.

==== Agricultural Society Trophy ====
The Wentworth club continued their slow decline from the highs of the previous season. After losing three out of their last four games, several fresh players were brought in to compete against the 'Varsity. For the first 15 to 20 minutes of the game, the two teams were equal. After that, University played with greater 'life' to win the game and progress. Wallaroo were awarded a bye and progressed into the semi-finals.

=== Finals Week 3, 28 August ===
RAS Trophy semi-finals
Randwick	24
University	3
Pirates	11
Wallaroo	7

==== Agricultural Society Trophy ====
Much of the brightness had disappeared by the time of the semi-finals. Representative duties robbed the games of the finest players, with the two semi finals being played at the inconveniently distant Kensington Racecourse. Even with a weak team, Randwick were able to defeat a lacklustre University 24 to 3. The second semi saw a more even contest between the Pirates and Wallaroo. The game was closely fought until the eventual victors were able to take the lead near the end of the match.

=== Finals Week 4, 28 August ===
RAS Trophy final
Randwick	17
Pirates	6

==== Agricultural Society Trophy ====
Prior to the final being played, the Metropolitan Rugby Union reversed their decision to allow the New Zealander, Tom Pauling, to play for Randwick. However, the eventual Premiers were determined to include him in their squad. As a result, there was much ill feeling from the Pirates towards Randwick. This manifested itself in the game with players being called to explain their actions at a later hearing. Both teams were missing players due to representative duties which gave the crowd much hope for a Pirates victory. Eventually, Randwick were victorious, being more able to penetrate the defence of the opposition and make every play count. After the game, the Union made the decision to strip Randwick of the trophy and award it to the Pirates.

== Statistics ==
=== Points ===
	Player	Pl	T	G	FG	Pts
1	Percy Macnamara	11	2	7	0	24
2	C Light	8	0	8	0	19
3	William Shortland	7	4	1	0	15
4	William Barrie	7	0	4	1	14
5	Allen Scott	9	1	5	0	13
6	Frank Nelson	11	4	0	0	12
7	EW Shaw	11	4	0	0	12
8	Syd Miller	7	4	0	0	12
9	Charlie Winn	6	4	0	0	12
10	W Harris	6	4	0	0	12

=== Tries ===
	Player	Pl	T
1	William Shortland	7	4
2	Frank Nelson	11	4
3	EW Shaw	11	4
4	Syd Miller	7	4
5	Charlie Winn	6	4
6	W Harris	6	4
7	John O'Neill	8	4
8	Ernest McMahon	9	3
9	Arthur Braund	9	3
10	John Fraser	9	3

- Statistics include Finals matches.

== Lower grades ==
The MRFU also conducted three junior competitions: First Juniors, Second Juniors, Third Juniors and Fourth Juniors.

=== First Juniors ===
Ten clubs signed up for First Juniors. The teams that played were: Newtown, Petersham, Summer Hill Oaklands, Marrickville, University II, North Sydney, Mercantile, Homebush, Strathfield and Buccaneer. At the end of the regular rounds, the Buccaneer club were sitting at the top of the ladder. In the semi-finals, Buccaneer won against Summer Hill Oaklands and Homebush defeated Mercantile. In the final, Homebush defeated Buccaneer 9 points to 4 to win the premiership.

=== Second Juniors ===
Thirteen clubs submitted a team for Second Juniors. Teams were: Redfern Waratah, Richmond, University III, Parramatta Ormonde, Glebe, Manly Federal, Stanmore Institute, Adelphi, Rockdale, Pirates II, Waverley, Kogarah and Lyric. When the regular games were completed, Redfern Waratah, Glebe, Manly Federal and Rockdale qualified for the semi-finals. The final saw Manly Federal defeated Redfern Waratah 9 points to nil. Manly Federal were declared premiers.

=== Third Juniors ===
Eighteen clubs initially signed up to play Third Juniors. However, seventeen teams played in the competition. These teams were: Adelphi II, Bay View, Summer Hill Oaklands II, Granville Royal, East Sydney, Newtown Cambridge, Woollahra Junior, Chelsea, Avoca, Adler, Richmond II, Leichhardt Gladstone, Gladesville, Grosvenor, Endeavour, Iona and Homebush II. At the conclusion of the regular rounds, the final four teams playing in the semi-finals were Newtown Cambridge, Endeavour, Leichhardt Gladstone and Bayview. The final saw Endeavour play Bayview for the premiership. Endeavour won the match 3 points to nil to remain undefeated for the year.

=== Fourth Juniors ===
Sixteen clubs submitted a team to play Fourth Juniors. Teams in the competition were: Newtown Orlando, Newtown Avenue, Alexandria Premier, Balmain Waratah, Buccaneer II, Manly Federal II, Victoria, Chelsea II, St Mary's Union, Redfern Waratah II, Forest Lodge Cambridge, Carolina, Endeavour II, Pirates III, Redfern Cambridge and Willoughby Federal. The semi finals saw Victoria win against Balmain Waratah and Forest Lodge Cambridge defeat Alexandria Premiers. The final saw Forest Lodge Cambridge win against Victoria 6 points to 3 to be declared premiers.

== Participating clubs ==
Club	Senior Grade	Junior Grade			
Club	Senior Grade	1st	2nd	3rd	4th
Adelphi Football Club			Y	Y	
Adler Football Club				Y	
Alexandria Premier Football Club					Y
Avoca Football Club				Y	
Balmain Waratah Football Club					Y
Bay View Football Club				Y	
Buccaneer Football Club		Y			Y
Carolina Football Club					Y
Chelsea Football Club				Y	Y
East Sydney Football Club				Y	
Endeavour Football Club				Y	Y
Forest Lodge Cambridge Football Club					Y
Gladesville Football Club				Y	
Glebe Football Club			Y		
Granville Royal Football Club				Y	
Grosvenor Football Club				Y	
Homebush Football Club		Y		Y	
Iona Football Club				Y	
Kogarah Football Club			Y		
Leichhardt Gladstone Football Club				Y	
Lyric Football Club			Y		
Manly Federal Football Club			Y		Y
Marrickville Football Club		Y			
Mercantile Football Club		Y			
Newtown Football Club		Y			
Newtown Avenue Football Club					Y
Newtown Cambridge Football Club				Y	
Newtown Orlando Football Club					Y
North Sydney Football Club		Y			
Paddington Football Club	Y				
Parramatta Ormonde Football Club			Y		
Petersham Rugby Football Club		Y			
Pirates Football Club	Y		Y		Y
Randwick Football Club	Y				
Redfern Cambridge Football Club					Y
Redfern Waratah Football Club			Y		Y
Richmond Football Club			Y	Y	
Rockdale Football Club			Y		
St Mary's Union Club					Y
Stanmore Institute Football Club			Y		
Strathfield Football Club		Y			
Summer Hill Oaklands Football Club		Y		Y	
Sydney University Football Club	Y	Y	Y		
Victoria House Football Club					Y
Wallaroo Football Club	Y				
Waverley Football Club			Y		
Wentworth Football Club	Y				
Willoughby Federal Football Club					Y
Woollahra Junior Football Club				Y	
