= 1885 Southern Rugby Union season =

Rugby season in 1885

1885 Sydney Rugby Premiership
- Duration: May 16 to September 5
- Teams: 8
- Premiers: Sydney University (3rd title)
- Runners-up: Wallaroo
- Wooden spoon: St. Leonards (1st spoon)
- Top point-scorer: John Wood (85)
- Top try-scorer: John Wood (11)

The 1885 Southern Rugby Union season was the 12th season of the Sydney Rugby Premiership. This was the third competition for the Gardiner Cup which was awarded to the winners of the premiership. The football season lasted from May till September 1885. The season culminated in the premiership, which was won by Sydney University. University were awarded the Gardiner Challenge Cup and were crowned premiers by a committee of the Union. The club were undefeated during the premiership season.

== Teams ==
In 1885, the Union decided to elevate three Junior clubs into the Gardiner Challenge Cup. Arfoma, St. Leonards and Newtown had performed well during the previous season and were given the opportunity to compete for the cup.

Teams
Name	Icon	Formed	Ground	Captain
Arfoma		Prior to 1883	None	EC Ebsworth
Balmain		c.1873	None	Ewen Cameron
Burwood		c.1876	Burwood Park	Samuel Chapman
Newtown		prior to 1883	Macdonaldtown Park	Sharpe
Redfern		24 May 1878	Redfern Ground	George Walker
St. Leonards		June 1872	The Reserve	FT Cheeseman
Sydney University		c.1863	University Ground	Charles Tange
Wallaroo		19 May 1871	Wallaroo Ground	George Graham

== Rule changes ==
In 1885 the Sydney Rugby Premiership continued to develop into a more structured competition. Before the season began, the Southern Rugby Football Union decided to promote three Junior Clubs into the Gardiner Challenge Cup. This took the competing teams to eight. The number of games during the season also increased, with most of the teams playing each other twice. However, at the conclusion of the season, some clubs had not played the same number of games as others. The competition still did not see organised rounds and an official points ladder.

== Season summary ==
Overall, the season was not seen as being as brilliant as the previous. The Association Cricket Ground became unavailable during the season, which had an effect upon the games being played. This ground was the only one that fenced in the playing field. As a result, many games were interrupted by the crowds encroaching upon the field. The Agricultural Society made their ground available to the Union later in the season, with two games often being played side-by-side. This did see some confusion with players stopping play in one game on hearing the call from the other game.

Despite a deficit in their defence and kicking, the Sydney University Football Club proved to be the Premier club and were awarded the Gardiner Challenge Cup. The 'Varsity were well organised and displayed consistent form during the season. The team put the same players onto the field each week. As a result, the club were undefeated during the cup campaign with their only losses coming from non-cup games with a weakened team.

The Wallaroo Football Club displayed occasional brilliance on the field. On a good day, they demonstrated excellent forward play. However, a heavy schedule of 20 games across all matches saw the club become inconsistent in their performance. In 14 Cup games, the team won 8. Despite being beaten by Burwood, Wallaroo were ranked second for the season due to winning more games.

Last season's Premiers, Burwood, were considered the more all-round team. The club finished their season with a draw against the eventual champions.

== Ladder ==
=== 1885 Gardiner Challenge Cup ===
	Team	Pld	W	D	L	B	PF	PA	PD
1	Sydney University	14	12	2	0	0	177	23	+154
2	Wallaroo	14	8	1	5	0	90	77	+13
3	Burwood	12	6	3	3	0	86	31	+55
4	Arfoma	11	4	3	4	0	69	48	+21
5	Redfern	13	4	3	6	0	45	32	+13
6	Balmain	13	4	3	6	0	49	85	-36
7	Newtown	12	2	3	7	0	24	161	-137
8	St. Leonards	11	1	0	10	0	30	113	-83

- The ladder shown above was calculated using results of games published in newspapers of the period. Only games indicated as Gardiner Challenge Cup games or games between cup teams were included. Games against non-cup teams were not included. Ladders published in newspapers of the period included games against teams not included in the cup. Inconsistencies occur between the ladders published and the results recorded. This may be due to the Union altering results as a result of protests.

== Lower grades ==
The Southern Rugby Football Union classified the participating clubs into two groups, Seniors and Juniors. Prior to 1883, all clubs were considered for the Premiership. With the introduction of the Gardiner Challenge Cup, only Senior clubs participated in the competition. The Junior clubs competed with each other, but no award was recognised for their achievements. Matches between Senior and Junior teams were common place, with results in those matches possibly assisting in deciding the final Senior Premiership winner.

In 1885, the top Junior Clubs were Balmain Wellington and Rosedale who were both undefeated for the season.

== Representative games ==
=== Intercolonial matches ===
In 1885, the New South Wales Rugby team visited Brisbane to play two matches against the Queensland team. For the first time, the Gardiner Cup continued to be played. This saw some of the local clubs losing valuable players and were thus unable to form a team to play their matches. Some controversy was present in the newspapers concerning the selection of certain NSW players and the omittance of other players in the team. With this in mind, the Queensland team had the edge in the first match, defeating NSW 14 points to nil. After this success, the Queensland team was seen to be a little over confident heading into the second match. As a result, they were out classed and were defeated by NSW 12 points to 2.

7th New South Wales – Queensland Intercolonial Football Match

19 August 1885

Queensland	14 - 0	New South Wales
Tries: AJ Hickson (3), J Byron, JS Anderson; Goals: F Hardgrave (0/5); Drop goals: F Hardgrave (1/1)

Albert Sports Ground
Attendance: 4000

8th New South Wales – Queensland Intercolonial Football Match

29 August 1885

Queensland	2 - 12	New South Wales
Tries: T Pratten; Goals: F Hardgrave (0/1)		Tries: H Fligg (2), GW Graham; Goals: JA O'Donnell (1/2), AC Radcliffe (1/1)

Albert Sports Ground
Attendance: 4500

== Team and player records ==
=== Top 10 point scorers ===
Pts	Player	T	G	FG
85	John Wood	11	21	0
36	James O'Donnell	3	10	0
24	Fred Cheeseman	2	4	2
17	EC Ebsworth	1	5	0
16	George Graham	8	0	0
16	Herb Lee	8	0	0
14	Francis Baylis	4	2	0
12	Leo Neill	6	0	0
10	FH Clapin	5	0	0
10	Charles Tange	5	0	0

=== Top 10 try scorers ===
T	Player
11	John Wood
8	George Graham
8	Herb Lee
6	Leo Neill
5	FH Clapin
5	Charles Tange
5	GW McArthur
4	Francis Baylis
4	Henry Fligg
4	CY Caird

=== Most points in a match (team) ===
Pts	Team	Opponent	Venue	Date
27	Sydney University	Newtown	Agricultural Society Ground	22 August
26	Wallaroo	Newtown	Darlington Reserve	6 June
26	St. Leonards	Newtown	Macdonaldtown Park	8 August
25	Arfoma	Balmain	Agricultural Society Ground	29 August
22	Redfern	Newtown	Redfern Ground	27 June
22	Burwood	St. Leonards	Burwood Park	25 July
22	Sydney University	Balmain	University Ground	1 August

=== Greatest winning margin ===
Pts	Team	Score	Opponent	Venue	Date
27	Sydney University	27 - 0	Newtown	Agricultural Society Ground	22 August
26	Wallaroo	26 - 0	Newtown	Darlington Reserve	6 June
26	St. Leonards	26 - 0	Newtown	Macdonaldtown Park	8 August
25	Arfoma	25 - 0	Balmain	Agricultural Society Ground	29 August
22	Redfern	22 - 0	Newtown	Redfern Ground	27 June
22	Burwood	22 - 0	St. Leonards	Burwood Park	25 July

== Participating clubs ==
Club	Senior Grade		Junior
Club	1st	2nd	Junior
Albion Football Club			Y
Arfoma Football Club	Y	Y	
Balmain Rugby Football Club	Y	Y	
Balmain Harrowgate Football Club			Y
Balmain Wellington Football Club			Y
Burwood Football Club	Y	Y	
Cammeray Football Club			Y
Double Bay Football Club			Y
Glebe Football Club			Y
Manly Football Club			Y
Newtown Football Club	Y	Y	
Our Boys Football Club			Y
Parramatta Football Club			Y
Parramatta Union Football Club			Y
Petersham Rugby Football Club			Y
Randwick Football Club			Y
Redfern Football Club	Y	Y	
Rosedale Football Club			Y
St. Leonards Football Club	Y		
Sydney University Football Club	Y	Y	
Wallaroo Football Club	Y	Y	
Waverley Football Club			Y
Wentworth Football Club			Y
