= Geoff Richards (rugby union) =

- Born: 30 April 1951 (age 75) Hornchurch, England

Rugby union career
- Position: Fullback
International career
Years	Team	Apps	(Points)
1978–1981	Australia	3	(3)
Coaching career
- Years: Team
- 2010: Richmond F.C.
- 2000–2007: England Women

Geoff Richards (born 30 April 1951) is a former rugby union player and coach. He coached England at the 2006 Women's Rugby World Cup. He resigned as head coach in 2007.

He played for Wasps in England before emigrating to Australia, where his club was Eastern Suburbs in Sydney. Due to the injury toll faced by the Wallabies in their tour of New Zealand in 1978, Richards was selected to play, and eventually played three times for Australia. In 2010, he resigned as coach for Richmond.
