= 1903 Metropolitan Rugby Union season =

1903 Sydney Rugby Premiership
- Duration: 2 May to 22 August
- Teams: 8
- Premiers: Eastern Suburbs (1st title)
- Minor Premiers: Eastern Suburbs (1st title)
- Runners-up: Glebe
- Wooden spoon: Balmain (3rd spoon)
- Top point-scorer: Reg Harris (27)
- Top try-scorer: Walter Davis (6) Walter Ogaard (6)

Second Grade
- Number of teams: 10
- Premiers: Newtown
- Runners-up: Eastern Suburbs

Boroughs Competition
- Number of teams: 17
- Premiers: Gipps
- Runners-up: Balmain

The 1903 Metropolitan Rugby Union season was the 30th season of the Sydney Rugby Premiership. It was the fourth season run for clubs that represented a district. Eight clubs (seven representing a district, the remaining club representing Sydney University) competed from May till August 1903. The season culminated in the fourth district premiership, which was won by Eastern Suburbs. Eastern Suburbs were crowned premiers by virtue of finishing the season on top of the table.

== Teams ==
Eight clubs contested the season; seven clubs representing a district and one club representing Sydney University.

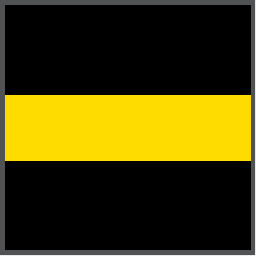
Balmain Formed on 26 March 1900; Ground: Birchgrove Oval; Captain: R Hutchenson

Eastern Suburbs Formed on 22 March 1900; Ground: Hampden Park; Captain: Percy Macnamara

Glebe Formed on 15 March 1900; Ground: Wentworth Park; Captain: William Howe

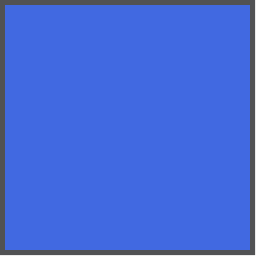
Newtown Formed on 22 March 1900; Ground: Erskineville Oval; Captain: Edward Larkin

North Sydney Formed on 23 March 1900; Ground: North Sydney Oval; Captain: Jack O'Donnell

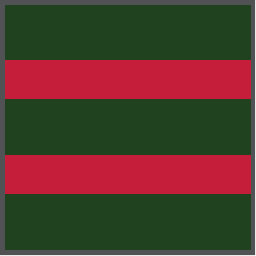
South Sydney Formed on 26 March 1900; Ground: RAS Showground; Captain: J Bourke

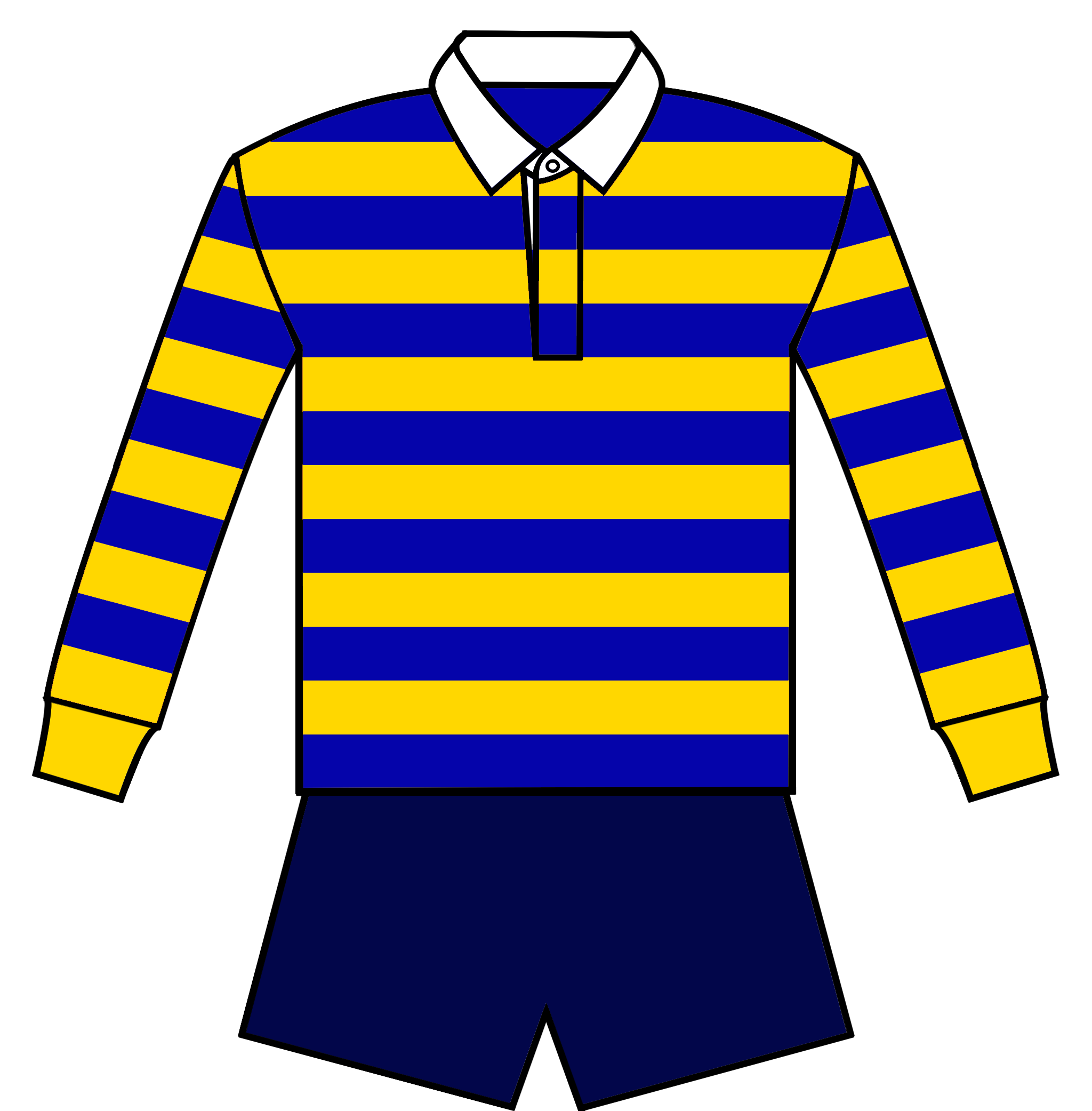
Sydney University Formed on 19 August 1865; Ground: University Oval; Captain: John Manning

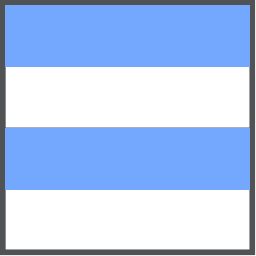
Western Suburbs Formed on 22 March 1900; Captain: Stanley Wickham

== Season summary ==
The success of Eastern Suburbs in the 1903 Sydney Rugby Premiership was popular with the football public. This was mostly due to the fact that the club were first-time winners and played the game in a sporting fashion. The team displayed excellent defence, letting in only eight tries during the season. Eastern Suburbs opened the season by defeating Glebe by 4 points to 3, and that victory proved a highly important one to both teams, as, at the close, there was one competition point between them. From start to finish of the season, Eastern Suburbs either held the leading position or shared the lead with another club.

Glebe, who finished second, were the only team who scored at least one try in every match. The club finished strongly by winning the last 6 rounds of the season. As a pack they were superior to that of any other team, excepting Eastern Suburbs. At no time did they equal the best of their form in other seasons.

After a bit of a slow start to the season, Newtown began to display outstanding brilliance in attack. This led them to move quickly up the ladder and finish the season in a strong third place. Newtown were the most brilliant all-round team in the competition, yet lacked that solidity.

At the conclusion of the season, the Rugby world saw the shock death of another of their players. Wallace Millican, three-quarter for Newtown, died of blood poisoning on 30 August after spending most of the week confined to his bed. Millican was 21 years old and hugely popular amongst the Newtown followers.

== Ladder ==
	Team	Pld	W	D	L	B	PF	PA	PD	Pts
1	Eastern Suburbs	13	10	1	2	0	89	41	+48	21
2	Glebe	13	9	2	2	0	89	48	+41	20
3	Newtown	13	7	2	4	0	114	65	+49	16
4	North Sydney	13	6	1	6	0	77	87	-10	13
5	Sydney University	13	5	2	6	0	101	65	+36	12
6	Western Suburbs	13	4	2	7	0	56	96	-40	10
7	South Sydney	13	4	0	9	0	50	73	-23	8
8	Balmain	13	1	2	10	0	56	157	-101	4

=== Ladder Progression ===
- Numbers highlighted in blue indicates the team finished first on the ladder in that round.
- Numbers highlighted in red indicates the team finished in last place on the ladder in that round

	Team	1	2	3	4	5	6	7	8	9	10	11	12	13
1	Eastern Suburbs	2	4	6	8	9	9	11	13	13	15	17	19	21
2	Glebe	0	2	4	5	6	8	8	10	12	14	16	18	20
3	Newtown	0	2	2	3	4	6	8	10	12	14	16	16	16
4	North Sydney	2	2	3	5	7	9	9	11	13	13	13	13	13
5	Sydney University	2	3	5	5	5	5	7	7	9	9	10	10	12
6	Western Suburbs	2	3	3	3	5	5	7	7	7	7	8	10	10
7	South Sydney	0	0	0	0	0	2	2	2	2	4	4	6	8
8	Balmain	0	0	1	3	4	4	4	4	4	4	4	4	4

== Statistics ==
=== Points ===
	Player	Pl	T	G	FG	Pts
1	Reg Harris	12	2	8	1	27
2	Percy Macnamara	13	3	6	0	24
3	Albert Cotter	5	2	5	1	22
4	WA Hay	12	1	8	0	20
5	HA Morton	11	0	8	0	20
6	Walter Davis	11	6	0	0	18
7	Walter Ogaard	12	6	0	0	18
8	Sid Riley	10	5	0	0	15
9	William Burleigh	12	5	0	0	15
10	Victor Futter	12	5	0	0	15

=== Tries ===
	Player	Pl	T
1	Walter Davis	11	6
	Walter Ogaard	12	6
3	Sid Riley	10	5
4	William Burleigh	12	5
5	Victor Futter	12	5
6	Patrick Carew	11	4
7	L Seaborn	10	4
8	William Hardcastle	6	4
9	E Quinsey	13	4
10	Nigel Barker	13	4

== Lower Grades ==
The MRFU also conducted Second Grade and Boroughs competitions this season.

=== Second Grade ===
Ten teams participated in the Second Grade competition: the eight First Grade clubs entered a team each, in addition two Boroughs clubs, Willoughby and Manly, were permitted to each enter a team. The season concluded with Newtown undefeated at the top of the table by a margin of 8 points. They were therefore declared premiers.

=== Boroughs Competition ===
Seventeen teams participated in the Boroughs Competition. The teams were split into two divisions of nine teams. In Division A was North Sydney, Willoughby, Mosman, Manly, East Sydney, Surrey Hills, Redfern, Balmain and Gipps. In Division B was Newtown, University, Waterloo, Rockdale, Glebe, Annandale, Leichhardt and Ashfield. At the end of the regular games, North Sydney finished at the top of Division A and Glebe finished at the top of Division B. The final saw Gipps beat Balmain 11 points to 6 to take the premiership.

== Participating clubs ==
Club	Grade		
Club	1st	2nd	B.
Annandale Football Club			Y
Ashfield Football Club			Y
Balmain District Football Club	Y	Y	Y
East Sydney Football Club			Y
Eastern Suburbs District Rugby Football Club	Y	Y	
Gipps Football Club			Y
Glebe District Football Club	Y	Y	Y
Leichhardt Football Club			Y
Manly Football Club		Y	Y
Mosman Football Club			Y
Newtown District Football Club	Y	Y	Y
North Sydney District Rugby Football Club	Y	Y	Y
Redfern Football Club			Y
Rockdale Football Club			Y
South Sydney District Football Club	Y	Y	
Surry Hills Football Club			Y
Sydney University Football Club	Y	Y	Y
Waterloo Football Club			Y
Western Suburbs District Rugby Football Club	Y	Y	
Willoughby Football Club		Y	Y
