= 1953 Australia rugby union tour of South Africa =

1953 rugby union tour

Summary
P	W	D	L
Total
27	17	1	9
Test match
4	1	0	3
Opponent
P	W	D	L
South Africa
4	1	0	3

The 1953 Australia rugby union tour of South Africa and Rhodesia was a series of 27 rugby union matches played by "Wallabies" in 1953, between June and October.

The test series was won by the Springboks with three test wins to one.

== Touring party ==
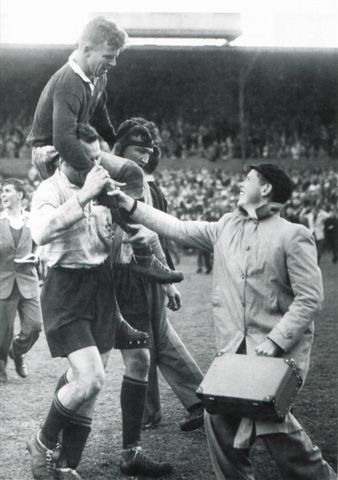
Wallaby captain Solomon chaired by the Springboks 1953

Of the team of 30 players, 25 were from Sydney; 1 from Newcastle – Cyril Burke; and 4 from Queensland – Tom Sweeney, Garth Jones, Gavan Horsley and Colin Forbes. The touring party consisted of:

- Manager: John 'Wylie' Breckenbridge
- Assistant Manager-Coach: A.C. 'Johnnie' Wallace
- Captain: John Solomon
- Vice-captain: Nick Shehadie

Playing squad:

- Full-backs: Ray Colbert, Tom Sweeney (Qld)
- Wingers: Eddie Stapleton, Garth Jones (Qld), Jim Phipps, Gavan Horsley (Qld)
- Centres: Herb Barker, Jack Blomley, John Solomon, Saxon White
- Fly-halves: Spencer Brown, Murray Tate
- Half-backs: Cyril Burke (Newcastle), John Bosler
- Locks: Brian Johnson, Mac Hughes
- Breakaways: Keith Cross, Bob Outterside, Colin Windon, David Brockhoff
- Second Row: Nick Shehadie, Ned Morey, Alan Cameron, Tony Miller, Colin Forbes (Qld),
- Front Row: Bob Davidson, Jack Carroll, Max Elliott
- Hookers: Jim Walsh, John Bain.

== Matches ==
Scores and results list Australia's points tally first.

Opposing Team	For	Against	Date	Venue	Status
Natal	14	15	20 June 1953	Durban	Tour Match
Comb. Northern University	22	14	24 June 1953	Pretoria	Tour Match
Transvaal 2nd XV	20	18	27 June 1953	Johannesburg	Tour Match
Orange Free State	3	28	1 July 1953	Kroonstad	Tour Match
Eastern Transvaal	15	12	4 July 1953	Springs	Tour Match
Rhodesia	18	15	8 July 1953	Salisbury	Tour Match
Rhodesia	8	8	11 July 1953	Kitwe	Tour Match
Rhodesia	31	11	15 July 1953	Bulawayo	Tour Match
Transvaal	14	20	18 July 1953	Newlands, Cape Town	Tour Match
Griqualand West	3	13	22 July 1953	Kimberley	Tour Match
Western Province	13	11	25 July 1953	Newlands, Cape Town	Tour Match
SW District	34	11	29 July 1953		Tour Match
Eastern Province	16	11	1 August 1953	Boet Erasmus, Port Elizabeth	Tour Match
Eastern Districts	25	6	5 August 1953	Burgersdorp	Tour Match
Border	9	6	8 August 1953	East London	Tour Match
Western Transvaal	50	12	12 August 1953	Potchefstroom	Tour Match
Northern Transvaal	11	27	15 August 1953	Loftus Versfeld, Pretoria	Tour Match
South Africa	3	25	22 August 1953	Ellis Park, Johannesburg	Test Match
Griqualand West	11	6	26 August 1953	Kimberley	Tour Match
Boland	14	13	29 August 1953	Wellington	Tour Match
Universities	5	24	2 September 1953	Cape Town	Tour Match
South Africa	18	14	5 September 1953	Cape Town	Test Match
Border	24	13	9 September 1953	Queenstown	Tour Match
Orange Free State	28	3	12 September 1953	Bloemfontein	Tour Match
South Africa	8	18	19 September 1953	Durban	Test Match
Eastern Province	39	17	23 September 1953	Port Elizabeth	Tour Match
South Africa	9	22	26 September 1953	Port Elizabeth	Test Match

== Bibliography ==
- Vivian Jenkins, ed. (1979). Rothmans Rugby Yearbook 1979–80. Rothmans Publications Ltd. ISBN 0-354-09087-9.

All found on http://trove.nla.gov.au

- Townsville Daily Bulletin, Monday 11 May 1953 p 3
- The Canberra Times, Monday 11 May 1953 p 3
- Queensland Times (Ipswich), Tuesday 9 June 1953 p 3
