= 1900 Metropolitan Rugby Union season =

1900 Sydney Rugby Premiership
- Duration: 19 May to 25 August
- Teams: 8
- Premiers: Glebe (1st title)
- Minor Premiers: Glebe (1st title)
- Runners-up: Sydney University
- Wooden spoon: Newtown (1st spoon)
- Top point-scorer(s): Iggy O'Donnell (61)
- Top try-scorer(s): Harry Blaney (11)

Second Grade
- Number of teams: 8
- Premiers: Glebe
- Runners-up: Eastern Suburbs

Third Grade
- Number of teams: 8
- Premiers: Glebe
- Runners-up: North Sydney

The 1900 Metropolitan Rugby Union season was the 27th season of the Sydney Rugby Premiership. It was the first season run for clubs that represented a district. Eight clubs (seven representing a district, the remaining club representing Sydney University) competed from May till August 1900. The season culminated in the first district premiership, which was won by Glebe. Glebe were crowned premiers by virtue of finishing the season on top of the table.

== Background ==
As early as 1893 it had been suggested to change the current structure of the premiership to a district-based formula. The idea was that district teams would distribute the top players amongst more teams creating a more equal competition. This would encourage crowds at matches to grow in size. However, members of the union were reluctant and voted against the proposal. This was based upon the grounds that the current clubs had a strong supporter base that may be lost if their club was barred from the competition. As well, it was believed that crowd sizes were adequate and not in fear of falling. The idea of district competition continued to be discussed over the following seasons.

At a NSWRFU meeting in early August, 1896, a motion was proposed and carried concerning district football. The proposal recommended that the County of Cumberland (Sydney and surrounding suburbs) be separated into eight districts and that the Senior and First Junior matches be played between these clubs. The eight districts proposed were North Sydney, Redfern, Glebe, St. George, Balmain, Paddington, Western Suburbs and East Sydney. The proposal included the University club who would only include players who were undergraduates. Districts were arranged upon electorate lines. The NSWRFU rejected the proposal in a heated and passionate meeting with the votes 44 to 16.

On 26 September 1898, at a meeting of the Metropolitan Rugby Football Union, the following recommendation was proposed, "That the football competition next season shall be competed for by clubs whose members are residents of such districts as may be allowed to each club." A ballot was taken and the recommendation won 22 to 12. A committee was set up to draw up a scheme to divide the Sydney region into eight districts, including Sydney University. However, the change was postponed to start in 1900 due to the eminent arrival of the English team and being able to adequately form a competitive team.

In 1900 a meeting of the Metropolitan Rugby Football Union was held and a recommendation to establish district football in the coming season was made. The motion was carried with a majority in favour. In response, existing clubs indicated their support for the new competition by either disbanding the current club or removing themselves from the senior competition. Meetings were held across the city over the coming months to form the various district clubs.

== Teams ==
Eight clubs contested the season; seven clubs representing a district and one club representing Sydney University. The 'Varsity were allowed to continue in the Premiership with the restriction that all players were required to be either current or former students. Each of the district clubs were newly formed with the foundations in former clubs.

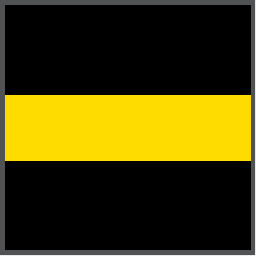
Balmain Formed on 26 March 1900; Ground: Birchgrove Oval; Captain: E Mullet

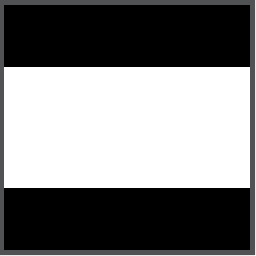
Eastern Suburbs Formed on 22 March 1900; Ground: Rushcutters Bay Oval; Captain: Percy Macnamara

Glebe Formed on 15 March 1900; Ground: Wentworth Park; Captain: Ernest McMahon

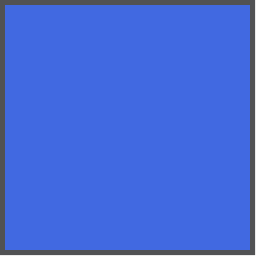
Newtown Formed on 22 March 1900; Captain: George Hay

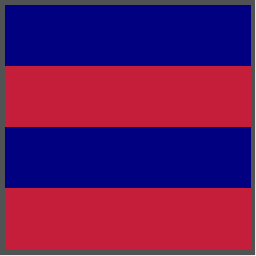
North Sydney Formed on 23 March 1900; Ground: North Sydney Oval; Captain: Paddy Lane

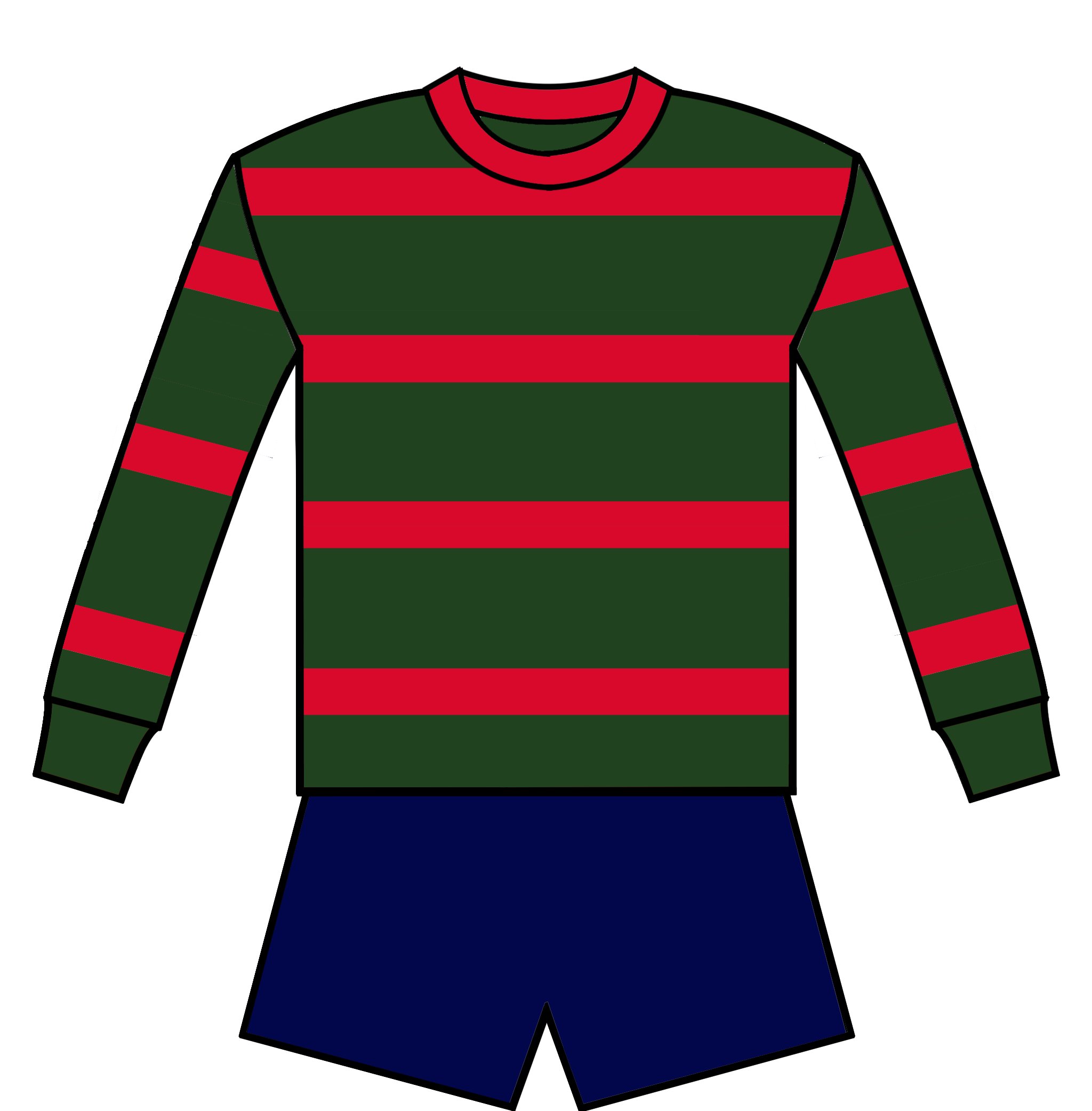
South Sydney Formed on 26 March 1900; Ground: RAS Showground; Captain: J Bourke

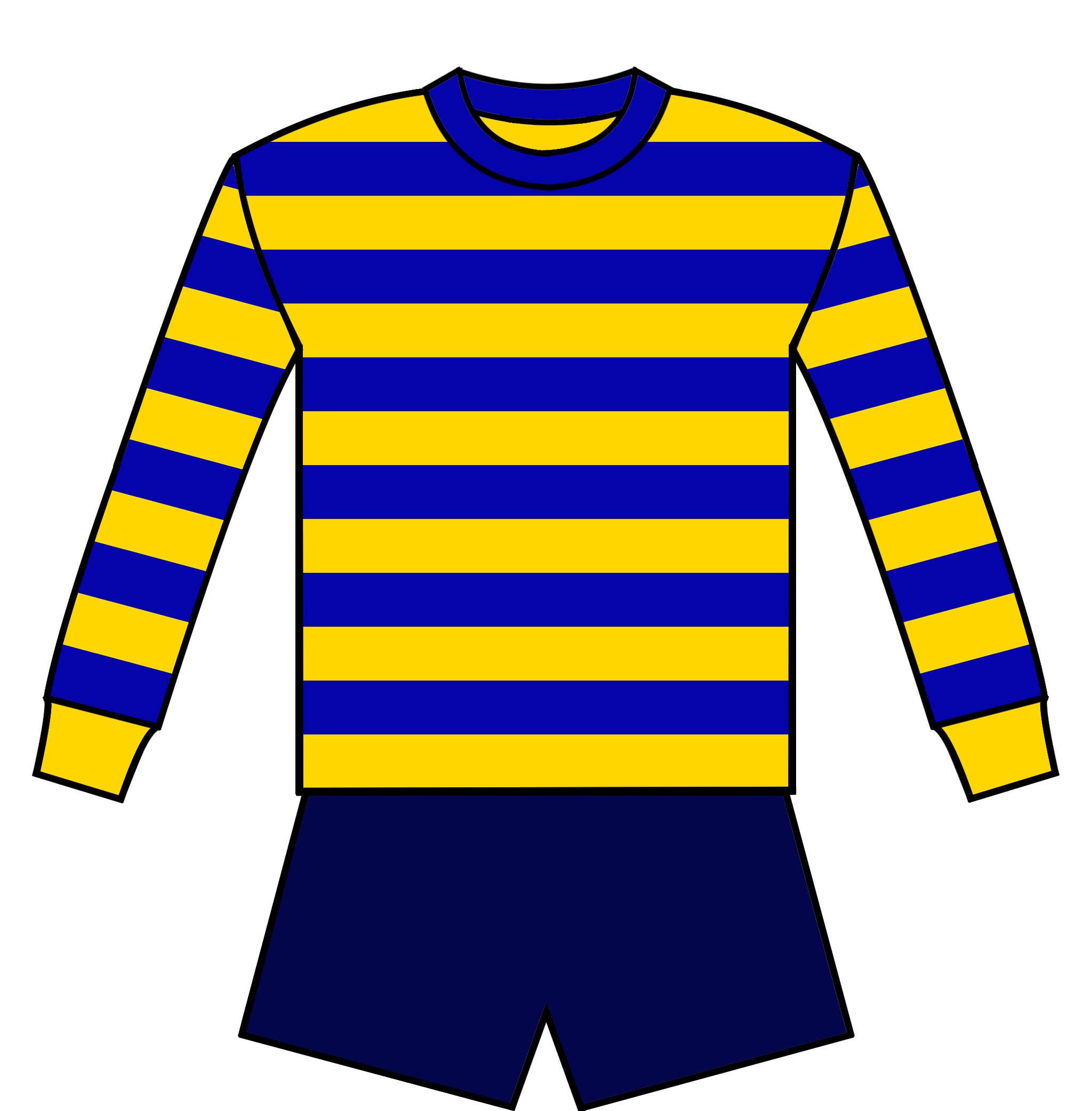
Sydney University Formed on 19 August 1865; Ground: University Oval; Captain: Harry Wood & Horace Jones

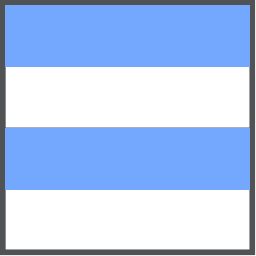
Western Suburbs Formed on 22 March 1900; Ground: Parramatta Oval; Captain: William Shortland

== Season summary ==
The 1900 Sydney Rugby Premiership and the move to a district-based structure was deemed a success. Greater public interest in football was seen with crowd attendances at games a positive. At the final round of the season, the top-of-the-table clash between Glebe and Sydney University at University Oval saw approximately 7,000 in attendance.

The winning club, Glebe, demonstrated more consistency during the season than the other clubs. After starting the season with four wins in the first seven rounds, they consistently developed their team until they were regarded as the finest team over the remaining seven rounds. They also benefitted from a very low injury toll to their players. Glebe won the two lower grade competitions to add to their first grade triumph.

Sydney University performed very well to become runners-up considering they had a terrible injury toll. This included their captain HD Wood whose career was ended due to his injuries. Their success was mostly due to players such as Harry Blaney and Frank Futter who scored nearly half of their tries.

For a greater part of the season, North Sydney were favourites for the premiership having only lost one game in the first ten rounds. However, when the club met Glebe in round eleven, they lost the game and three of their players were injured. The next round saw another injury to a player. North Sydney lost the last four remaining games (rounds 11 to 14) and with that the premiership.

== Ladder ==
	Team	Pld	W	D	L	B	PF	PA	PD	Pts
1	Glebe	14	11	1	2	0	156	57	+99	23
2	Sydney University	14	8	1	5	0	136	92	+44	17
3	North Sydney	14	7	2	5	0	138	78	+78	16
4	Western Suburbs	14	7	1	6	0	77	92	-15	15
5	South Sydney	14	6	1	7	0	67	92	-25	13
6	Eastern Suburbs	14	6	0	8	0	87	127	-40	12
7	Balmain	14	3	2	9	0	92	111	-19	8
8	Newtown	14	4	0	10	0	42	146	-104	8

=== Ladder progression ===
- Numbers highlighted in blue indicates the team finished first on the ladder in that round.
- Numbers highlighted in red indicates the team finished in last place on the ladder in that round

	Team	1	2	3	4	5	6	7	8	9	10	11	12	13	14
1	Glebe	2	2	4	4	5	7	9	11	13	15	17	19	21	23
2	Sydney University	0	2	2	4	6	6	8	10	11	13	15	17	17	17
3	North Sydney	2	4	6	6	7	9	11	13	14	16	16	16	16	16
4	Western Suburbs	2	4	4	6	6	8	10	10	10	10	10	12	14	15
5	South Sydney	2	2	4	4	4	4	4	4	6	7	7	9	11	13
6	Eastern Suburbs	0	0	0	2	4	4	4	6	8	8	10	10	10	12
7	Balmain	0	0	0	0	0	0	0	0	0	3	5	5	7	8
8	Newtown	0	0	2	4	4	6	8	8	8	8	8	8	8	8

== Statistics ==
=== Points ===
	Player	Pl	T	G	FG	Pts
1	Iggy O'Donnell	14	6	14	3	61
2	Harry Blaney	13	11	3	1	43
3	James Joyce	11	0	14	3	42
4	George Thomas	13	0	11	0	24
5	Stanley Wickham	13	3	6	0	23
6	Leo Finn	14	1	8	0	23
7	Ed Halloren	12	5	1	1	21
8	George Roberts	12	7	0	0	21
9	Charlie White	10	5	0	1	19
10	Frank Futter	13	6	0	0	18

=== Tries ===
	Player	Pl	T
1	Harry Blaney	13	11
2	George Roberts	12	7
3	Iggy O'Donnell	14	6
4	Frank Futter	13	6
5	Ed Halloren	12	5
6	E Hughes	11	5
7	William Shortland	13	5
8	Charlie White	10	5
9	William Hardcastle	12	4
10	Victor Harris	14	4

== Lower grades ==
The MRFU also conducted Second Grade and Third Grade competitions for teams representing the district clubs. Glebe were victorious in both lower grade competitions and were thus declared club champions across all three grades. Overall, the club had only lost two games across all three grades, being undefeated in both lower grade competitions.

=== Second grade ===
All of the clubs competing in the First Grade competition entered a team in Second Grade. Teams were: North Sydney, South Sydney, Eastern Suburbs, Western Suburbs, Newtown, Glebe, Balmain and Sydney university. At the conclusion of the season, Glebe finished the season undefeated at the top of the table and were declared Premiers.

=== Third grade ===
The same clubs competed in the Third Grade competition. Teams were: North Sydney, South Sydney, Eastern Suburbs, Western Suburbs, Newtown, Glebe, Balmain and Sydney University. At the conclusion of the season, Glebe again finished the season undefeated at the top of the table and were declared Premiers.

== Participating clubs ==
Club	Grade		
Club	1st	2nd	3rd
Balmain District Football Club	Y	Y	Y
Eastern Suburbs District Rugby Football Club	Y	Y	Y
Glebe District Football Club	Y	Y	Y
Newtown District Football Club	Y	Y	Y
North Sydney District Rugby Football Club	Y	Y	Y
South Sydney District Football Club	Y	Y	Y
Sydney University Football Club	Y	Y	Y
Western Suburbs District Rugby Football Club	Y	Y	Y
