= 1902 Metropolitan Rugby Union season =

1902 Sydney Rugby Premiership
- Duration: 17 May to 30 August
- Teams: 8
- Premiers: Western Suburbs (1st title)
- Minor Premiers: Western Suburbs (1st title)
- Runners-up: Sydney University
- Wooden spoon: Balmain (2nd spoon)
- Top point-scorer: Stanley Wickham (60)
- Top try-scorer: Patrick Higgins (11)

Second Grade
- Number of teams: 8
- Premiers: Glebe
- Runners-up: Eastern Suburbs

Boroughs Competition
- Number of teams: 16
- Premiers: Manly
- Runners-up: Glebe

The 1902 Metropolitan Rugby Union season was the 29th season of the Sydney Rugby Premiership. It was the third season run for clubs that represented a district. Eight clubs (seven representing a district, the remaining club representing Sydney University) competed from May till August 1902. The season culminated in the third district premiership, which was won by Western Suburbs. Western Suburbs were crowned premiers by virtue of finishing the season on top of the table.

== Teams ==
Eight clubs contested the season; seven clubs representing a district and one club representing Sydney University.

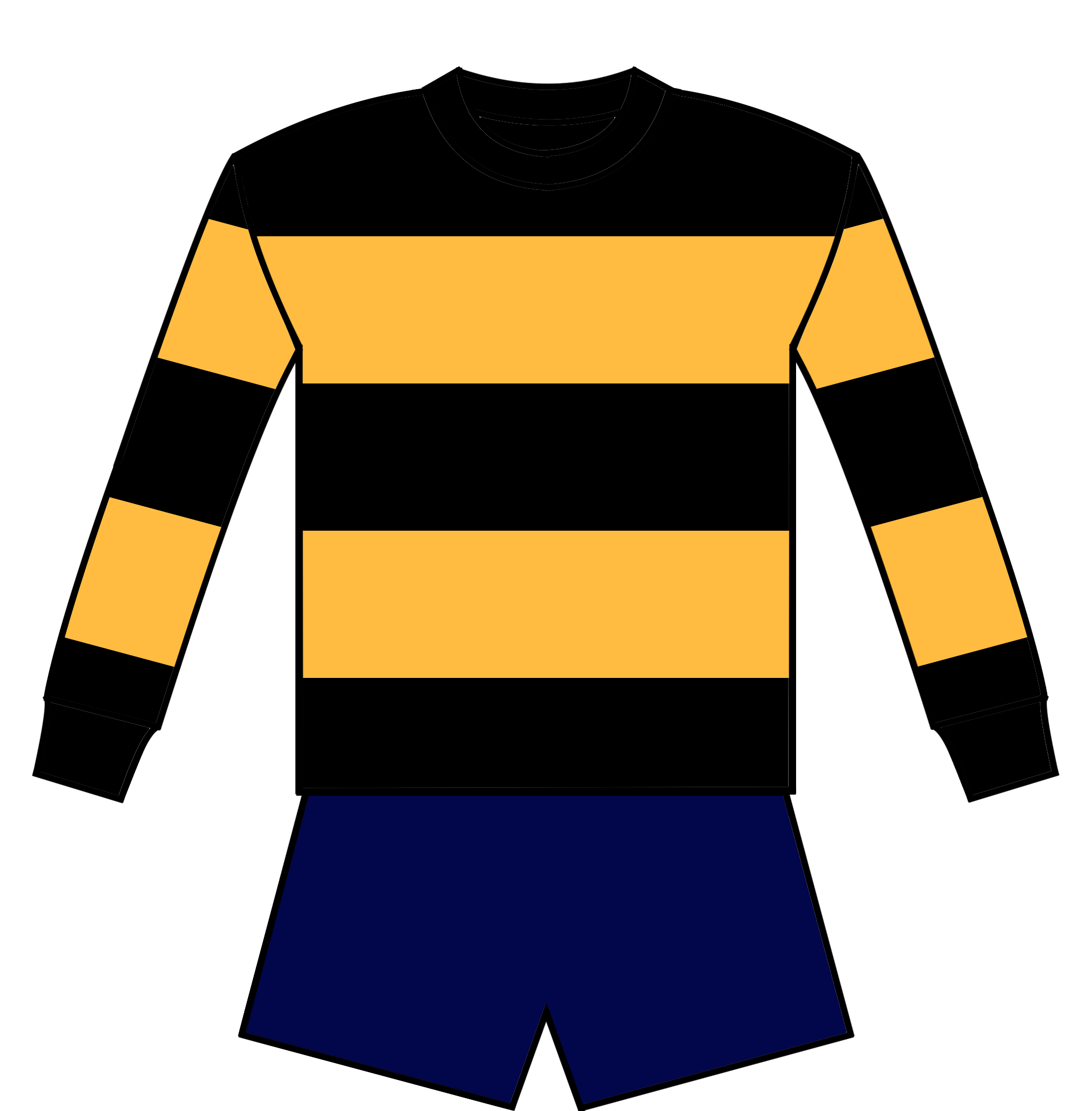
Balmain Formed on 26 March 1900; Ground: Birchgrove Oval; Captain: Walter Davis

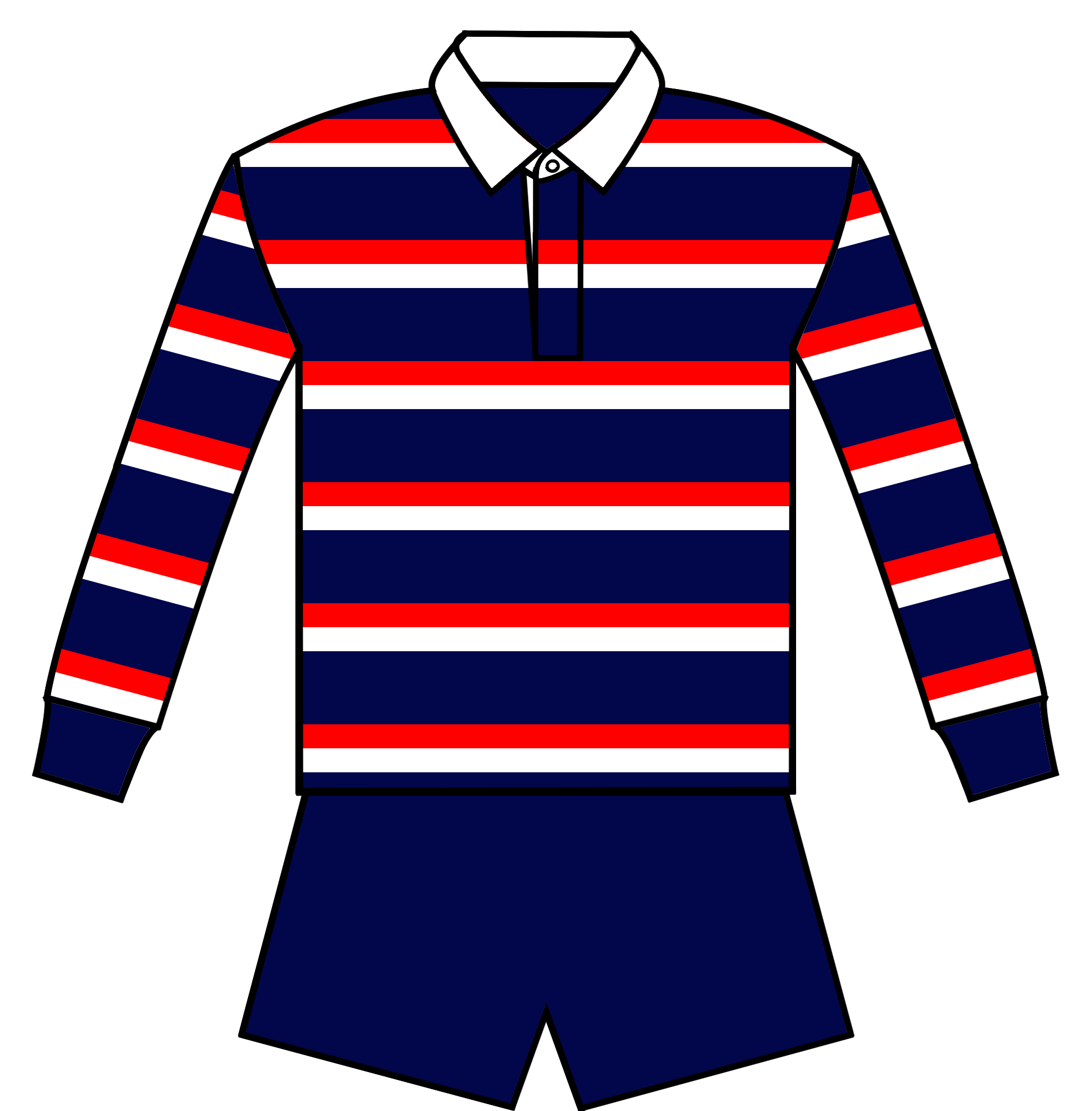
Eastern Suburbs Formed on 22 March 1900; Ground: Rushcutters Bay Oval; Captain: Percy Macnamara

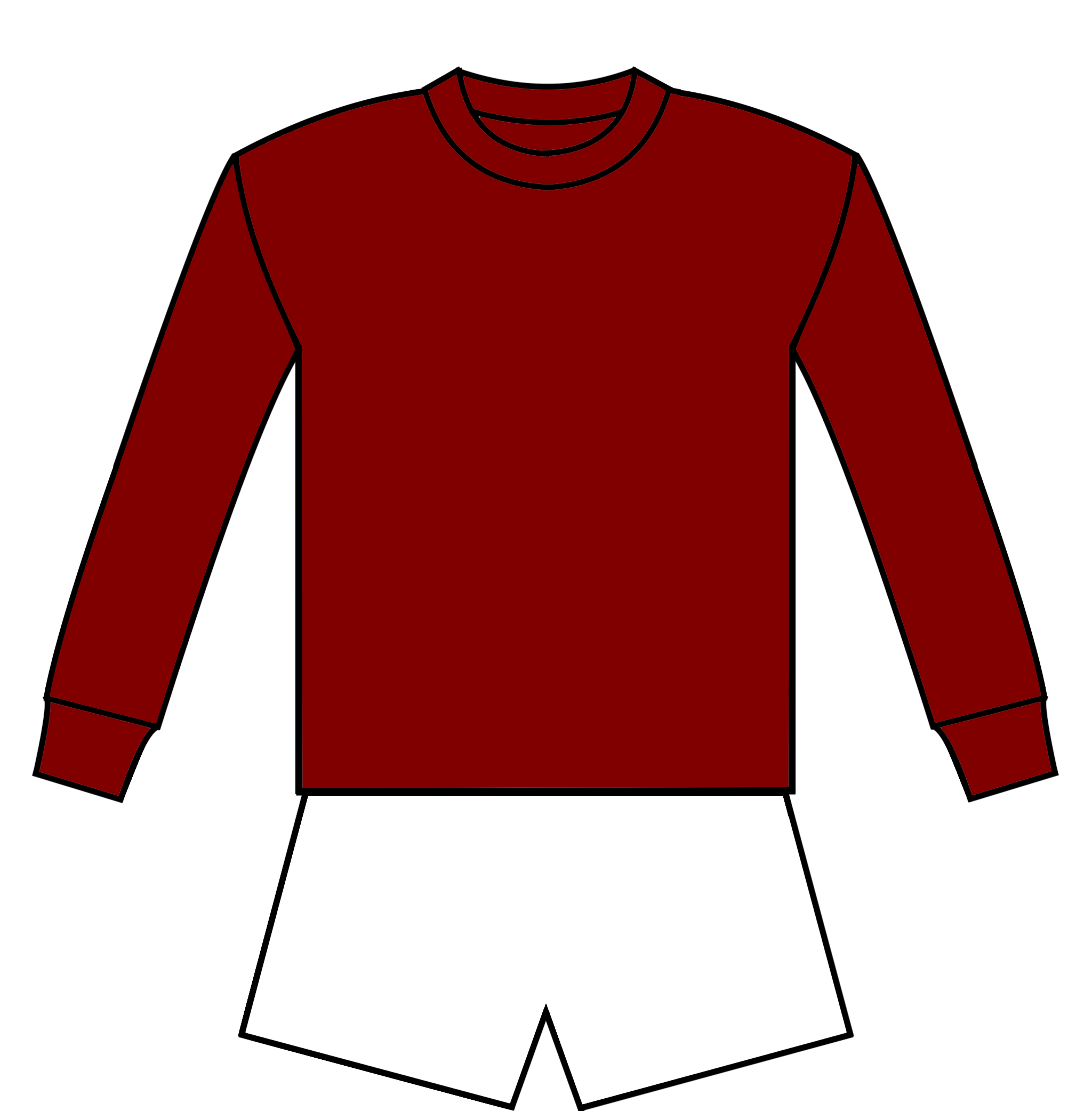
Glebe Formed on 15 March 1900; Ground: Wentworth Park; Captain: William Howe

Newtown Formed on 22 March 1900; Captain: Harold Judd

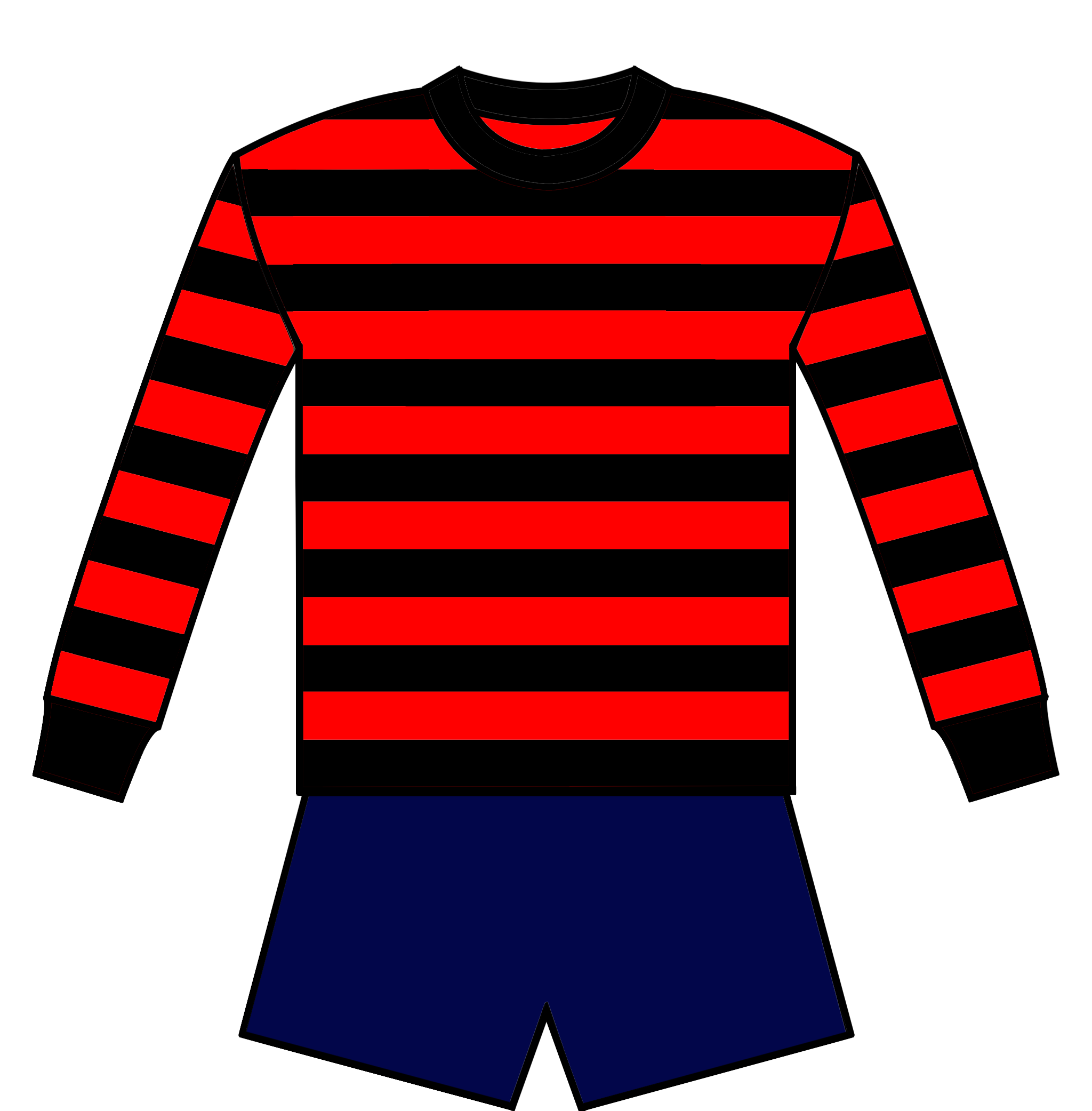
North Sydney Formed on 23 March 1900; Ground: North Sydney Oval; Captain: Jack O'Donnell

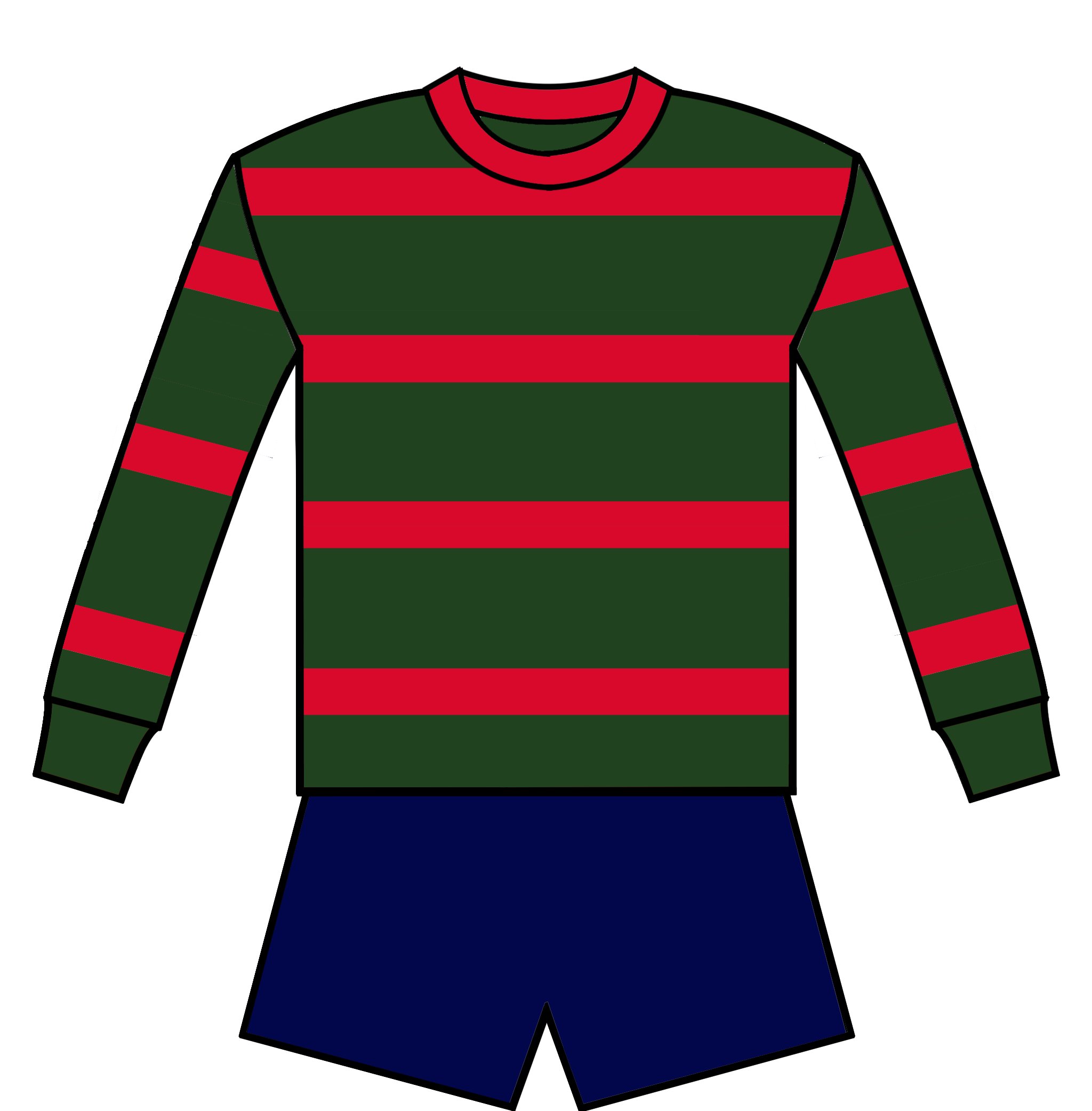
South Sydney Formed on 26 March 1900; Ground: RAS Showground; Captain: J Bourke

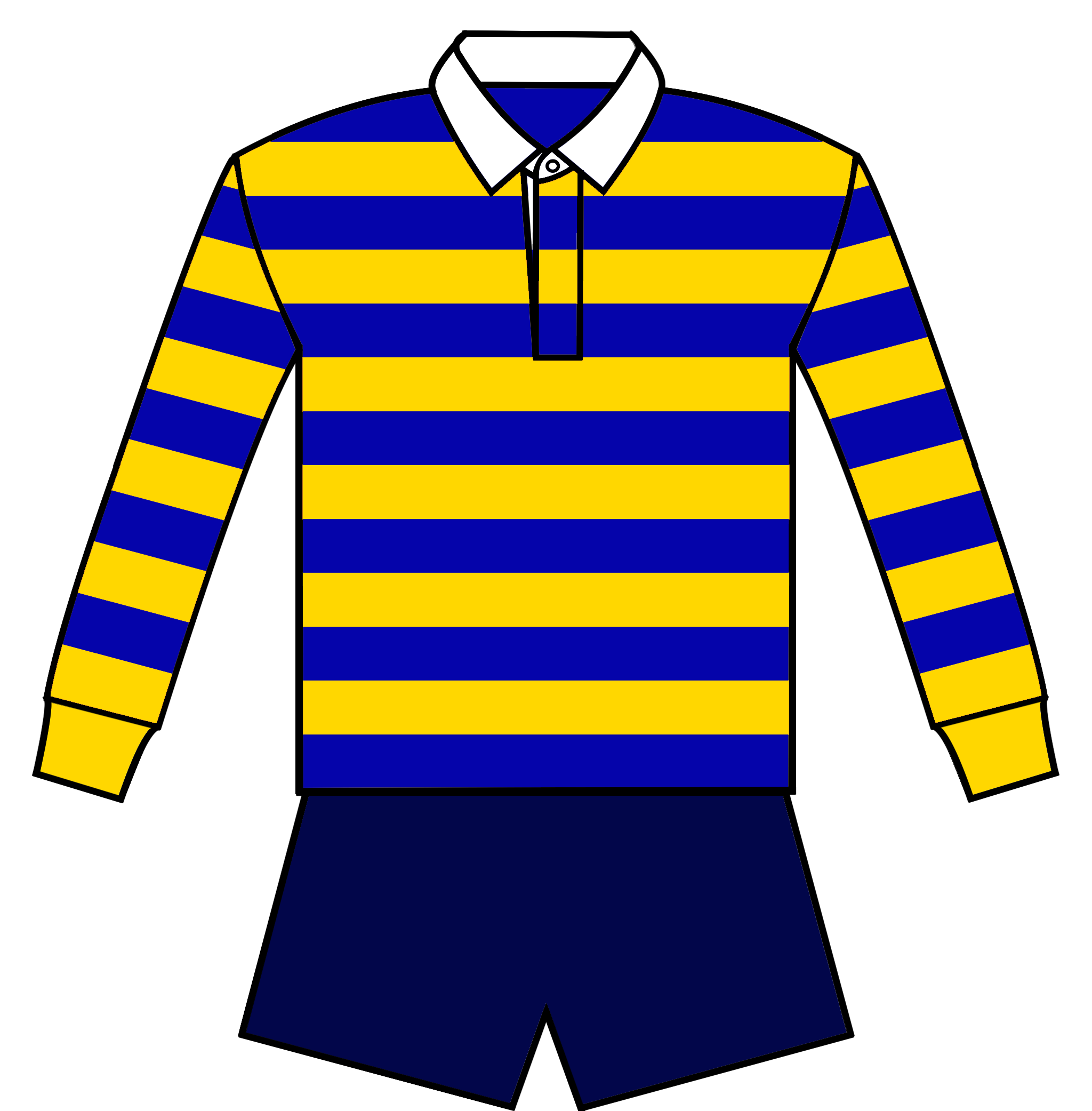
Sydney University Formed on 19 August 1865; Ground: University Oval; Captain: Harry Blaney

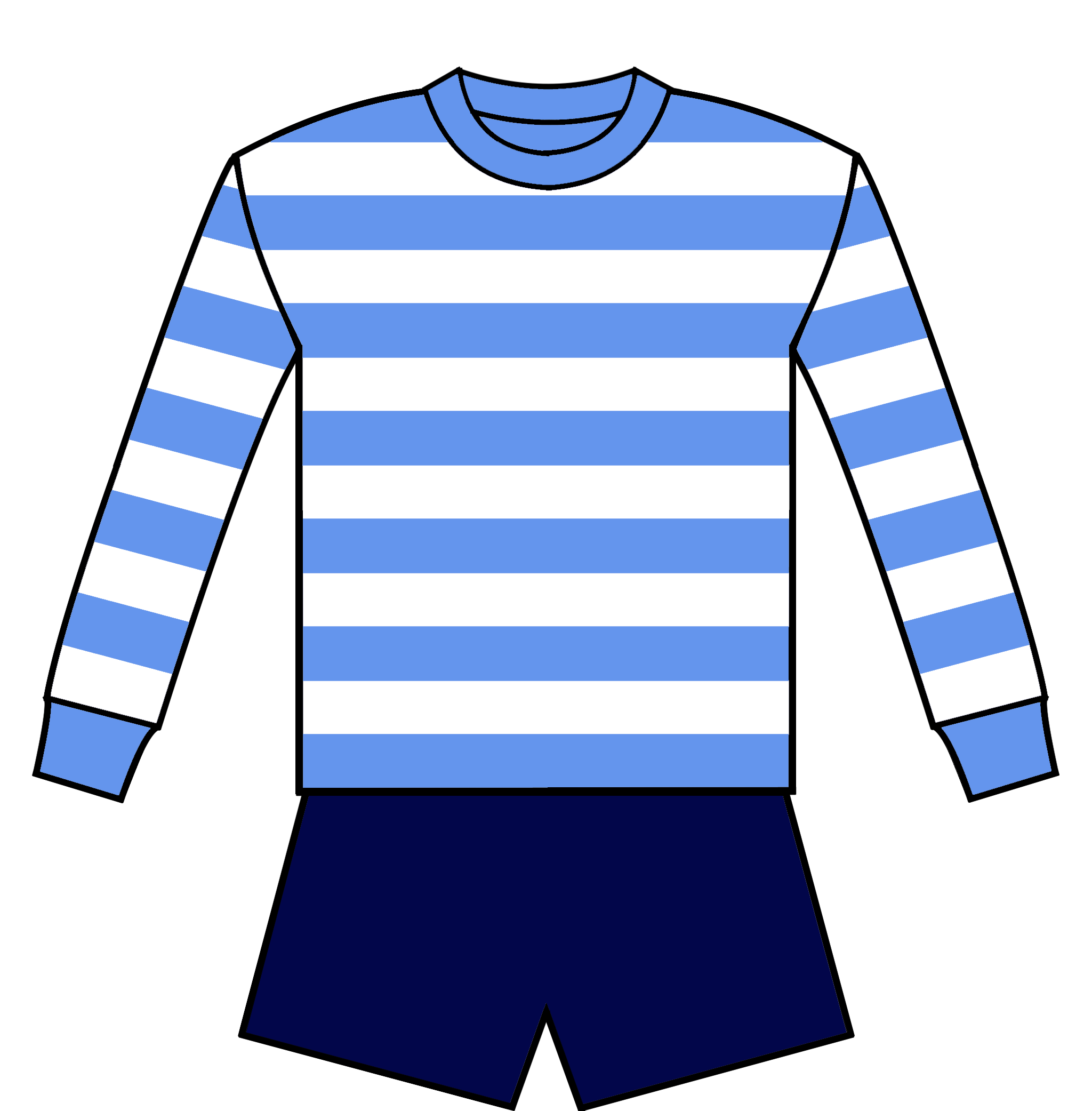
Western Suburbs Formed on 22 March 1900; Captain: Stanley Wickham

== Season summary ==
The 1902 Sydney Rugby Premiership saw a popular win for the Western Suburbs District Football Club. The club had experienced the unfortunate and sad loss of their captain, William Shortland, at the end of the previous season. During the season, the team recovered from this huge loss to display improvement in defence, with only 4 tries scored against them over the final 7 rounds. Three-Quarter, Stanley Wickham demonstrated the importance of having a great goal kicker in the team, scoring 11 field goals during the season with 5 scored in one game against South Sydney.

Glebe opened the season in magnificent form defeating the two teams that eventually finished above them on the ladder. However, as the season progressed the team was required to shift players around due to injuries to important members of the team. As a result, over the final four rounds Glebe drew with North Sydney, drew with Western Suburbs and lost the penultimate match to University 6 to 4. This meant that they were out of contention for the premiership in the final round.

The final round of the season had been originally scheduled for 26 July and was postponed to the end of August due to heavy and persistent rain. This meant that for the last round of games for the season, the two teams in contention for the premiership would face each other in a "final". In order that representatives in both teams be able to depart on time for the intercolonial matches in Queensland, the game was scheduled for Wednesday, 27 August at 2pm. Again rain interfered with the quality of the game which resulted in Western Suburbs winning against Sydney University 4 points to 3.

At the conclusion of the season, the rugby world lost another significant player with the death of former University captain Horace Jones. Jones had previously captained the NSW team in intercolonial matches and had retired from rugby at the end of the 1901 season due to ill health. His cause of death was sarcoma, a soft tissue cancer.

== Ladder ==
	Team	Pld	W	D	L	B	PF	PA	PD	Pts
1	Western Suburbs	14	10	1	3	0	148	70	+78	21
2	Sydney University	14	10	0	4	0	152	108	+44	20
3	Glebe	14	8	3	3	0	155	88	+67	19
4	North Sydney	14	8	2	4	0	136	56	+80	18
5	Eastern Suburbs	14	6	1	7	0	86	132	-46	13
6	Newtown	14	5	2	7	0	91	89	+2	12
7	South Sydney	14	3	1	10	0	56	147	-91	7
8	Balmain	14	1	0	13	0	63	197	-134	2

=== Ladder Progression ===
- Numbers highlighted in blue indicates the team finished first on the ladder in that round.
- Numbers highlighted in red indicates the team finished in last place on the ladder in that round

	Team	1	2	3	4	5	6	7	8	9	10	11	12	13	14
1	Western Suburbs	0	2	2	4	6	8	10	12	12	14	16	17	19	21
2	Sydney University	2	2	4	4	6	8	10	10	12	14	16	18	20	20
3	Glebe	2	4	6	6	6	8	10	12	14	16	17	18	18	19
4	North Sydney	0	1	3	5	7	7	7	9	11	13	14	14	16	18
5	Eastern Suburbs	2	4	4	4	4	4	6	6	8	8	8	10	12	13
6	Newtown	2	3	5	6	6	6	6	8	8	8	10	10	10	12
7	South Sydney	0	0	0	1	3	5	5	5	5	5	5	7	7	7
8	Balmain	0	0	0	2	2	2	2	2	2	2	2	2	2	2

== Statistics ==
=== Points ===
	Player	Pl	T	G	FG	Pts
1	Stanley Wickham	14	0	7	11	60
2	Harry Blaney	14	2	13	3	47
3	Frank Row	11	0	18	0	40
4	Patrick Higgins	12	11	0	0	33
5	Nigel Barker	13	10	0	0	30
6	Aub Johnstone	13	1	7	3	30
7	EC Deering	14	9	0	0	27
8	James Joyce	13	2	2	3	23
9	Thomas Comber	10	2	5	1	22
10	Humphrey Oxenham	13	7	0	0	21

=== Tries ===
	Player	Pl	T
1	Patrick Higgins	12	11
2	Nigel Barker	13	10
3	EC Deering	14	9
4	Humphrey Oxenham	13	7
5	Ed Halloren	12	7
6	George Roberts	12	7
7	R Wickham	12	6
8	RH Carlisle	14	5
9	Victor Harris	13	4
10	C Rundle	10	4

== Lower Grades ==
The MRFU also conducted Second Grade and Boroughs competitions this season.

=== Second Grade ===
The eight First grade clubs entered a team each into the Second Grade competition. The season concluded with a final game between Glebe and Eastern Suburbs that was practically a final. The game ended in a draw. However, Glebe were declared premiers as they were one point ahead of Eastern Suburbs on the ladder.

=== Boroughs Competition ===
Sixteen teams participated in the first Boroughs Competition. This was a competition for teams that did not necessarily represent a district. Non-district teams acted as a feeder club for the larger district teams. These teams were: Manly, Glebe, Gipps, Willoughby, Surry Hills, Rockdale, Balmain, Newtown, Leichhardt, Burwood, Marrickville, University, Annandale, North Sydney, Mosman and Parramatta. At the conclusion of the season, Manly sat undefeated at the top of the table and were thus declared Premiers.

== Participating Clubs ==
Club	Grade		
Club	1st	2nd	B.
Annandale Football Club			Y
Balmain District Football Club	Y	Y	Y
Burwood Football Club			Y
Eastern Suburbs District Rugby Football Club	Y	Y	
Gipps Football Club			Y
Glebe District Football Club	Y	Y	Y
Leichhardt Football Club			Y
Manly Football Club			Y
Marrickville Football Club			Y
Mosman Football Club			Y
Newtown District Football Club	Y	Y	Y
North Sydney District Rugby Football Club	Y	Y	Y
Parramatta Rugby Football Club			Y
Rockdale Football Club			Y
South Sydney District Football Club	Y	Y	
Surry Hills Football Club			Y
Sydney University Football Club	Y	Y	Y
Western Suburbs District Rugby Football Club	Y	Y	
Willoughby Football Club			Y
