= 1904 Metropolitan Rugby Union season =

1904 Sydney Rugby Premiership
- Duration: 7 May to 10 September
- Teams: 8
- Premiers: Sydney University (11th title)
- Minor Premiers: Sydney University (8th title)
- Runners-up: North Sydney
- Wooden spoon: Balmain (4th spoon)
- Top point-scorer: HE Glanville (52)
- Top try-scorer: William Burleigh (8)

Second Grade
- Number of teams: 10
- Premiers: Sydney University Glebe

Boroughs Competition
- Number of teams: 18
- Premiers: East Sydney
- Runners-up: Marrickville

The 1904 Metropolitan Rugby Union season was the 31st season of the Sydney Rugby Premiership. It was the fifth season run for clubs that represented a district. Eight clubs (seven representing a district, the remaining club representing Sydney University) competed from May till September 1904. The season culminated in the fourth district premiership, which was won by Sydney University. Sydney University were crowned premiers by virtue of finishing the season on top of the table.

== Teams ==
Eight clubs contested the season; seven clubs representing a district and one club representing Sydney University.

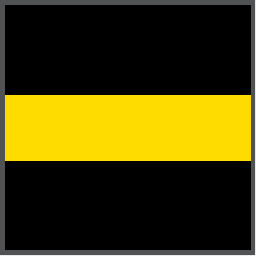
Balmain Formed on 26 March 1900; Ground: Birchgrove Oval; Captain: C Light

Eastern Suburbs Formed on 22 March 1900; Ground: Hampden Park; Captain: Patrick Carew

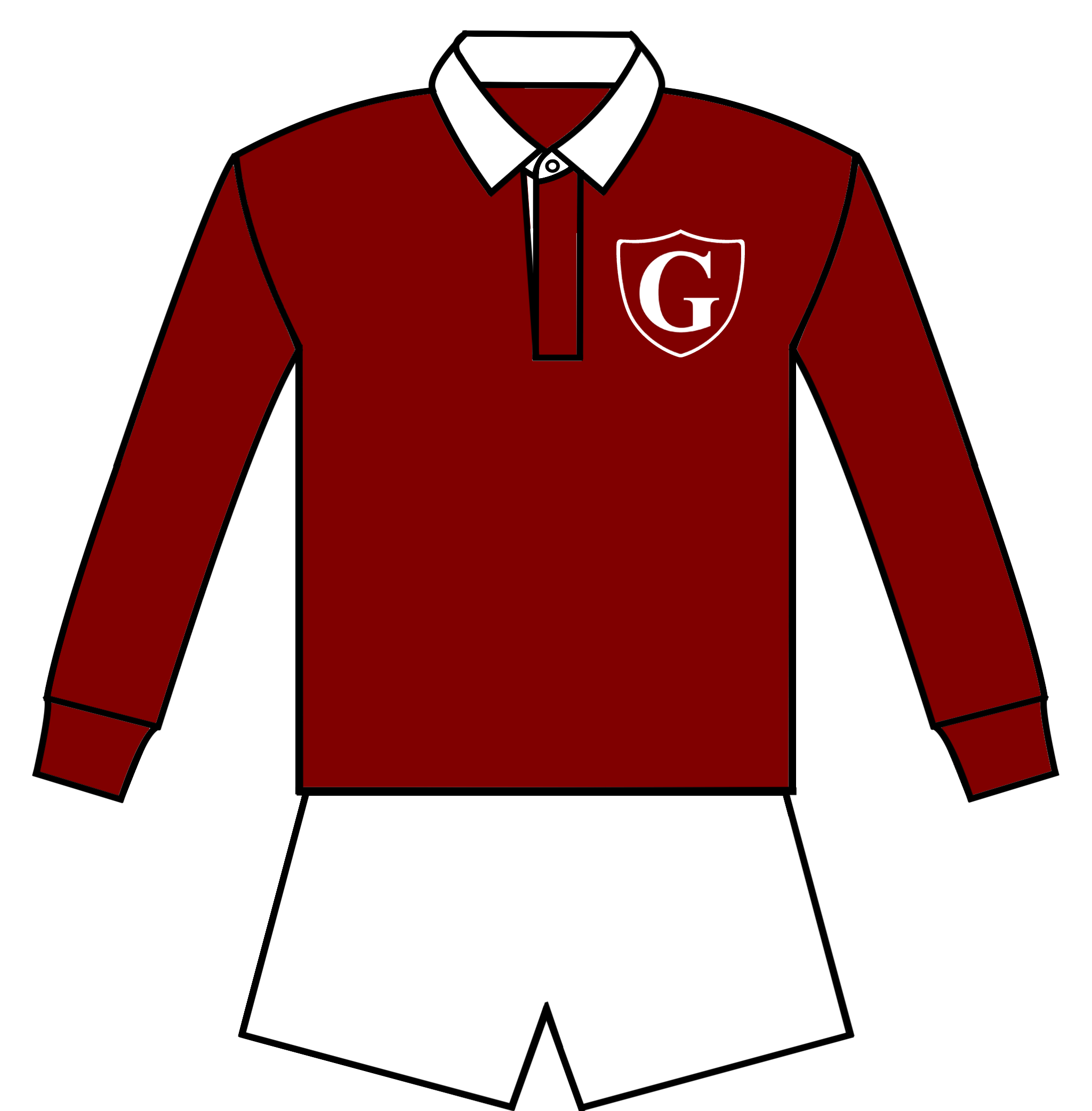
Glebe Formed on 15 March 1900; Ground: Wentworth Park; Captain: Victor Harris

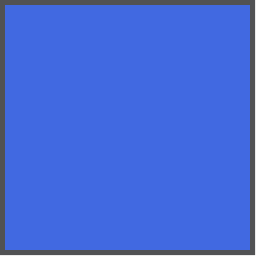
Newtown Formed on 22 March 1900; Ground: Erskineville Oval; Captain: Ross Brown

North Sydney Formed on 23 March 1900; Ground: North Sydney Oval; Captain: Charlie White

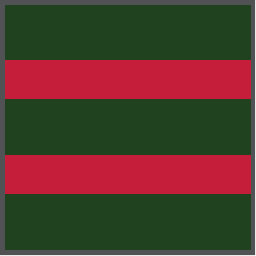
South Sydney Formed on 26 March 1900; Ground: Sydney Sports Ground; Captain: J Bourke

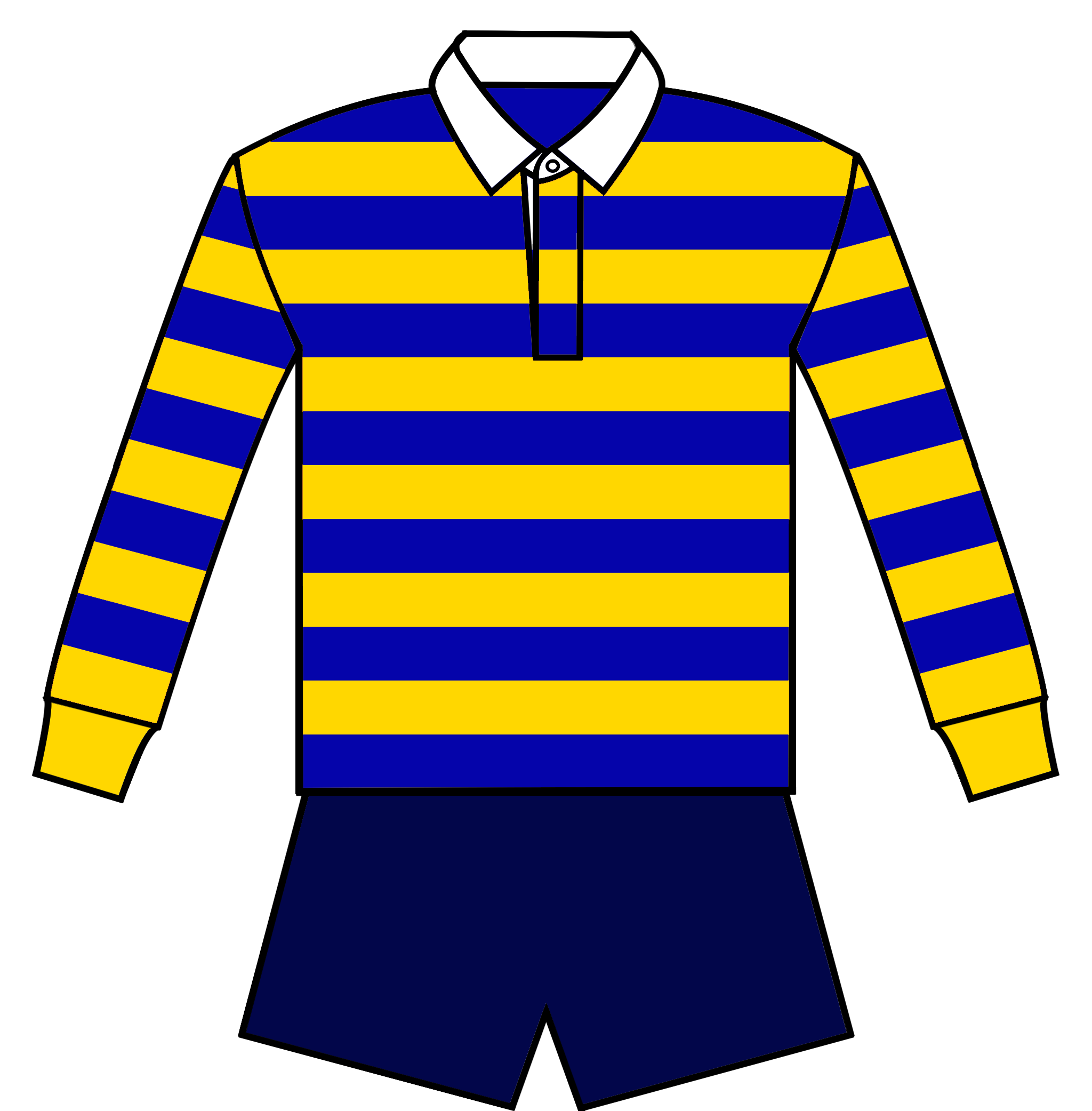
Sydney University Formed on 19 August 1865; Ground: University Oval; Captain: John Manning

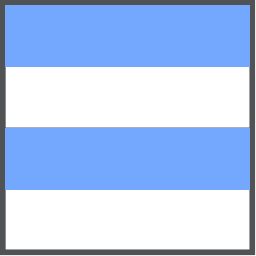
Western Suburbs Formed on 22 March 1900; Ground: St Luke's Park; Captain: Stanley Wickham

== Season summary ==
The 1904 Sydney Rugby Premiership was the most successful on record. The attendance of the public at the various matches was, on the average, the greatest yet known in Sydney football. In nearly every district there were young players coming into First Grade, developing play through lessons learnt from the games against the visiting British team.

For the first time in thirteen years, Sydney University carried off the premiership without any question of legitimacy. The team were one of the best during the first round of games, but their performance slipped during the second round. However, the team were worthy premiership winners despite their drop in form. It was a popular victory for the old club.

North Sydney finished the season in the runners-up position and could have won the premiership if they had not lost key players to the NSW tour of Queensland. Astonishingly, the team were only able to score 14 tries throughout the regular games compared to over twice that amount for the Varsity. In the end, they lost the premiership by one competition point.

South Sydney were considered the most dangerous of all of the teams. They were some of the most cleverest players in the competition displaying control, excellent tackling and smart tactics. Their weak point was their three-quarter line who, if they had performed better, may have given the team the premiership. South Sydney lost the premiership by the slim margin of two points.

== Ladder ==
	Team	Pld	W	D	L	B	PF	PA	PD	Pts
1	Sydney University	14	10	2	2	0	138	64	+74	22
2	North Sydney	14	10	1	3	0	92	64	+28	21
3	South Sydney	14	9	2	3	0	143	71	+72	20
4	Newtown	14	9	0	5	0	126	59	+67	18
5	Eastern Suburbs	14	6	2	6	0	160	92	+68	14
6	Glebe	14	4	1	9	0	57	133	-76	9
7	Western Suburbs	14	2	2	10	0	57	170	-113	6
8	Balmain	14	1	0	13	0	22	142	-120	2

=== Ladder Progression ===
- Numbers highlighted in blue indicates the team finished first on the ladder in that round.
- Numbers highlighted in red indicates the team finished in last place on the ladder in that round

	Team	1	2	3	4	5	6	7	8	9	10	11	12	13	14
1	Sydney University	2	4	6	8	10	12	14	16	17	17	19	19	20	22
2	North Sydney	2	3	5	7	9	9	9	11	13	15	17	17	19	21
3	South Sydney	0	2	4	4	5	7	9	11	11	13	15	17	18	20
4	Newtown	2	2	4	4	6	8	10	10	12	14	14	16	18	18
5	Eastern Suburbs	0	0	0	2	3	3	5	5	6	8	8	10	12	14
6	Glebe	0	2	2	3	3	5	5	7	7	7	7	9	9	9
7	Western Suburbs	0	1	1	2	2	2	2	2	4	4	6	6	6	6
8	Balmain	2	2	2	2	2	2	2	2	2	2	2	2	2	2

== Statistics ==
=== Points ===
	Player	Pl	T	G	FG	Pts
1	HE Glanville	12	1	13	4	52
2	Joseph McMahon	13	3	11	1	37
3	William Burleigh	13	8	0	2	32
4	Jack Verge	13	0	10	1	24
5	Charles Russell	7	5	3	0	21
6	Arthur Fisher	11	7	0	0	21
7	Victor Futter	14	7	0	0	21
8	Stanley Wickham	7	1	3	2	19
9	L Seaborn	12	6	0	0	18
10	Walter Ogaard	10	6	0	0	18

=== Tries ===
	Player	Pl	T
1	William Burleigh	13	8
2	Arthur Fisher	11	7
3	Victor Futter	14	7
4	L Seaborn	12	6
5	Walter Ogaard	10	6
6	Edward Mandible	11	5
7	Charles Russell	7	5
8	H Barry	8	5
9	Reg Baker	8	4
10	EG Hooper	11	4

== Lower Grades ==
The MRFU also conducted Second Grade and Boroughs competitions this season.

=== Second Grade ===
Ten teams participated in the Second Grade competition: the eight First Grade clubs entered a team each, in addition two Boroughs clubs, Gipps and Manly, were permitted to each enter a team. At the end of the regular games, North Sydney finished at the top of the ladder. The season concluded with a final between Sydney University and Glebe. The game resulted in a scoreless draw, with both teams declared joint premiers.

=== Boroughs Competition ===
Eighteen teams participated in the Boroughs Competition. The teams were split into two divisions of nine teams. In Division A was North Sydney, Willoughby, Mosman, Manly, East Sydney, Surry Hills, Redfern, Balmain and Gipps. In Division B was Marrickville, University, Waterloo, Rockdale, Glebe, Annandale, Leichhardt, Rozelle and Ashfield. At the end of the regular games, North Sydney finished at the top of Division A and Marrickville finished at the top of Division B. The final saw East Sydney beat Marrickville 6 points to 5 to take the premiership.

== Participating Clubs ==
Club	Grade		
Club	1st	2nd	B.
Annandale Football Club			Y
Ashfield Football Club			Y
Balmain District Football Club	Y	Y	Y
East Sydney Football Club			Y
Eastern Suburbs District Rugby Football Club	Y	Y	
Gipps Football Club		Y	Y
Glebe District Football Club	Y	Y	Y
Leichhardt Football Club			Y
Manly Football Club		Y	Y
Marrickville Football Club			Y
Mosman Football Club			Y
Newtown District Football Club	Y	Y	
North Sydney District Rugby Football Club	Y	Y	Y
Redfern Football Club			Y
Rockdale Football Club			Y
Rozelle Football Club			Y
South Sydney District Football Club	Y	Y	
Surry Hills Football Club			Y
Sydney University Football Club	Y	Y	Y
Waterloo Football Club			Y
Western Suburbs District Rugby Football Club	Y	Y	
Willoughby Football Club			Y
