= Futter =

Futter is a surname. Notable people with the surname include:

- Ellen V. Futter (born 1949), American museum administrator
- Frank Futter (c. 1880–1941), Australian rugby union player
- Walter Futter (1900–1958), American film producer and director
