= Murray Tate =

Rugby player (1927–2010)

- Full name: Murray James Tate
- Born: 5 June 1927 Clovelly, Sydney, Australia
- Died: 27 January 2010 (aged 82) Randwick, Sydney, Australia

Rugby union career
- Position: Fly-half
International career
Years	Team	Apps	(Points)
1951–54	Australia	8	(3)

Murray James Tate (5 June 1927 — 27 January 2010) was an Australian rugby union international.

Born in Sydney, Tate educated at Waverley College.

Tate, a fly-half, won first-grade premierships with Eastern Suburbs in 1946 and 1947. He was a Wallabies player from 1951 to 1954, gaining eights caps. His career included the 1952 tour of New Zealand and 1953 tour of South Africa.

His daughter married Eastern Suburbs and South Sydney rugby league player Ken Wright.

== See also ==
- List of Australia national rugby union players
