= Ned Morey =

- Full name: Edward Bolton Morey
- Born: 31 October 1929 Brighton, Victoria, Australia
- Died: 14 August 2004 (aged 74)
- Height: 6 ft 4 in (193 cm)
- Weight: 203 lb (92 kg)

Rugby union career
- Position: Lock
Provincial / State sides
Years	Team	Apps	(Points)
- New South Wales
International career
Years	Team	Apps	(Points)
1953	Australia		

Edward Bolton Morey (31 October 1929 – 14 August 2004) was an Australian international rugby union player.

Morey was born in the Melbourne suburb of Brighton and educated at Sydney Church of England Grammar School, where he was restricted to the third XV. He didn't play first grade rugby until 1951, four years after leaving school. A Northern Suburbs captain, Morey was a sizeable second rower and excelled in line outs.

In 1953, Morey debuted for NSW and gained a Wallabies call up for their tour of South Africa, as back up for Alan Cameron and Tony Miller, the latter a former schoolmate. He was the largest member of the Wallabies pack and made a total of eight uncapped appearances during the tour, which ended early for him due to a thigh injury.

Morey later represented Victoria while playing for Melbourne club Powerhouse.

== See also ==
- List of Australia national rugby union players
