= Max Elliott (rugby union) =

Australian rugby union international

- Full name: Francis Maxwell Elliott
- Born: 20 December 1929 Sydney, Australia
- Died: 23 March 1988 (aged 58)
- School: Scots College
- University: University of Sydney
- Occupation: Medical practitioner

Rugby union career
- Position: Prop
International career
| Years | Team | Apps | (Points) |
| 1957 | Australia | 1 | (0) |

Francis Maxwell Elliott (20 December 1929 – 23 March 1988) was an Australian rugby union international.

Elliott was born in Sydney and educated at Scots College. He had to play his rugby with a built-up left boot, the result of a childhood injury that stopped further growth of his left leg from the knee down.

A prop, Elliott won four first-grade premierships with the University of Sydney and also played for Eastern Suburbs. He was first called up by the Wallabies for the 1952 tour of New Zealand and gained further experience on the 1953 tour of South Africa, without appearing in the Test matches on either tour. His solitary cap came as a loosehead prop against the All Blacks at the Sydney Cricket Ground in 1957, filling in for Nick Shehadie.

Elliott died of suicide in 1988 at the age of 58.

== See also ==
- List of Australia national rugby union players
