= Garth Jones =

- Full name: Garth Glennie Jones
- Born: 18 November 1931 Childers, QLD, Australia
- Died: 22 March 1993 (aged 61)

Rugby union career
- Position: Wing
International career
Years	Team	Apps	(Points)
1952–56	Australia	12	(12)

Garth Glennie Jones (18 November 1931 — 22 March 1993) was an Australian rugby union international.

Born in Childers, Jones learnt his rugby at Brisbane Boys' College.

Jones, a red-haired GPS winger, was capped 12 times for the Wallabies. On the 1953 tour of South Africa, he scored the winning try against the Springboks in Cape Town, running the length of the field to put the Wallabies in front with two minutes remaining. His final Wallabies appearance in 1956 was against the Springboks in Sydney.

== See also ==
- List of Australia national rugby union players
