= Peter Rothwell (rugby union) =

Australian rugby union player (1929–2013)

- Full name: Peter Ratcliffe Rothwell
- Born: 7 July 1929 Melbourne, Australia
- Died: 12 September 2013 (aged 84) Sydney, Australia

Rugby union career
- Position: Fullback
International career
Years	Team	Apps	(Points)
1951–52	Australia	4	(8)

Peter Ratcliffe Rothwell (7 July 1929 – 12 September 2013) was an Australian rugby union international.

Educated at North Sydney Technical High School, Rothwell was a Northern Suburbs fullback, capped four times for the Wallabies. He made his way into the national team in 1951, for a home series against the All Blacks, having impressed with his accurate goal-kicking for New South Wales. After playing all three Tests in the series, Rothwell made only one further Wallabies appearance, in a win over Fiji at the Sydney Cricket Ground in 1952.

== See also ==
- List of Australia national rugby union players
