= Jack Blomley =

Australian rugby union player (1927–1973)

- Born: 7 March 1927 Tumbarumba, NSW, Australia
- Died: 15 February 1973 (aged 45)
- School: St Joseph's College
- University: University of Sydney
- Occupation: Doctor

Rugby union career
- Position: Centre
International career
Years	Team	Apps	(Points)
1949–50	Australia	7	(3)

Jack Blomley (7 March 1927 — 15 February 1973) was an Australian rugby union international.

== Biography ==
Originally from Tumbarumba near the Snowy Mountains, Blomley was educated in Sydney at St Joseph's College. He was a Combined GPS representative in 1944 and played first-grade for Sydney University during his medical studies.

Blomley, an inside centre, was capped seven times for the Wallabies, debuting in 1949 with three home Tests against the NZ Māori team. He played both Tests on that year's tour of New Zealand, with the Wallabies winning an away series over the All Blacks for the first time, then a further two Tests against the 1950 British Lions. After time out game as he completed his medical degree, Blomley returned for the 1953 tour of South Africa and had the distinction of captaining the Wallabies against Griqualand West, although an ankle injury suffered in the match kept him out of the Test series.

Retiring after the South Africa tour, Blomley moved to Newcastle and established a medical practice. He served as a volunteer medical officer with the Royal Australian Army Medical Corps in Vietnam for most of 1967.

Blomley died of a heart attack in 1973 at the age of 45.

== See also ==
- List of Australia national rugby union players
