= Bill Hemingway =

Rugby player (1908–1981)

- Full name: Wilfrid Hubert Hemingway
- Born: 22 September 1908 Auckland, New Zealand
- Died: 12 April 1981 (aged 72) Dubbo, NSW, Australia
- Height: 5 ft 9 in (175 cm)
- School: Sydney Grammar School
- University: University of Sydney
- Occupation: Solicitor

Rugby union career
- Position: Wing
International career
Years	Team	Apps	(Points)
1928–32	Australia	5	(9)

Wilfrid Hubert Hemingway (22 September 1908 — 12 April 1981) was an Australian rugby union international.

Hemingway, born in Auckland, immigrated to Australia as a young child and attended Sydney Grammar School.

A speedy winger, Hemingway attained five Test caps between 1928 and 1932, making his debut aged 19.

Hemingway, a solicitor by profession, played first-grade rugby for Sydney University while studying for his law degree and later joined Northern Suburbs, for which he set a club record 101 points in the 1932 season.

== See also ==
- List of Australia national rugby union players
