= David Sio =

Samoa international rugby union player

- Born: 21 June 1962 (age 64) Apia, Samoa
- Notable relative: Scott Sio (son)

Rugby union career
Amateur team(s)
Years	Team	Apps	(Points)
1988	South Island Universities		
Senior career
Years	Team	Apps	(Points)
1992-1995	Northern Suburbs		
Provincial / State sides
Years	Team	Apps	(Points)
1988-1989	Canterbury	10	(0)
International career
Years	Team	Apps	(Points)
1989-1992	Samoa	2	(0)

Tavita G. Sio, also known by his anglicised name David Sio (born Apia, 21 June 1962) is a former Samoan rugby union player. He played as a prop.

== Career ==
He made his debut for Samoa in a test match against Tonga, at Tokyo on 11 April 1990. He was part of the 1991 Rugby World Cup roster. His last international match was in a test match against Fiji, at Suva, on 20 June 1992.

== Personal life ==
He is the father of Scott Sio, who currently plays for Australia.
