= Scott Sio =

Australia & Samoa international rugby union player

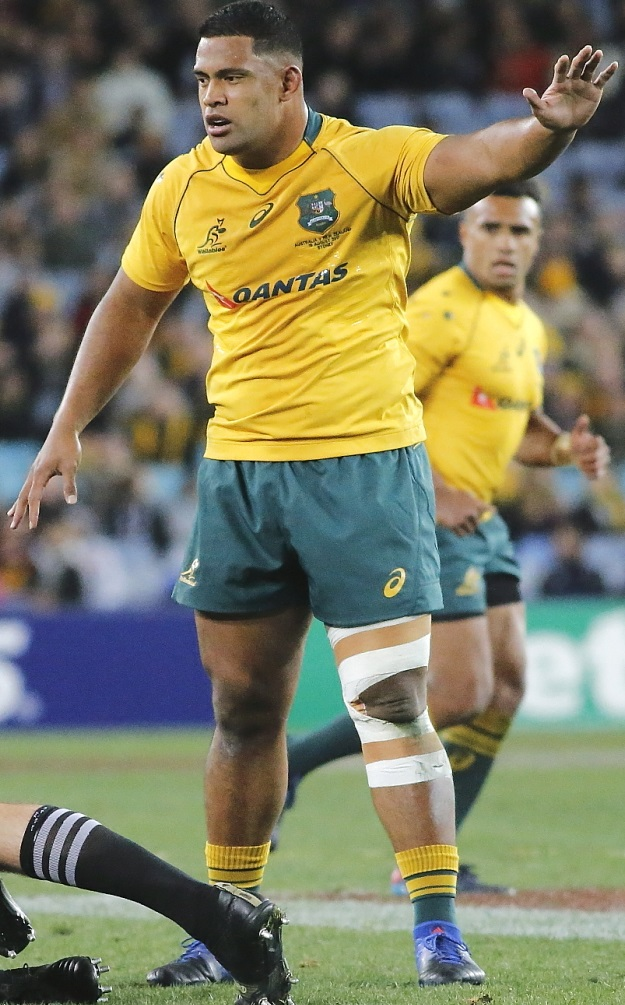
- Born: Scott Sio; 16 October 1991 (age 35) Sydney, New South Wales, Australia
- Height: 185 cm (6 ft 1 in)
- Weight: 122 kg (269 lb; 19 st 3 lb)
- Notable relative: David Sio (father)

Rugby union career
- Position: Loosehead Prop
- Current team: Cardiff Rugby
Amateur team(s)
Years	Team	Apps	(Points)
- Northern Suburbs
–	University of Canberra Vikings		
–	North Harbour Rays		
Senior career
Years	Team	Apps	(Points)
2016−2022	Canberra Vikings	0	(0)
2022–2026	Exeter Chiefs	86	(50)
2026–	Cardiff Rugby	4	(0)
- Correct as of 31 October 2026
Super Rugby
Years	Team	Apps	(Points)
2012–2022	ACT Brumbies	143	(20)
- Correct as of 15 July 2026
International career
Years	Team	Apps	(Points)
2011	Australia U20	6	(5)
2013–2022	Australia	74	(5)
2025–	Samoa	3	(0)
- Correct as of 7 November 2026
Medal record
Men's rugby union
Representing Australia
Rugby World Cup
Silver medal – second place	2015 England	Squad

Scott Sio (born 16 October 1991) is an Australian and Samoa rugby union player who plays for Cardiff Rugby and is a former coach at Devon club Topsham RFC. His playing position is prop. He made his Brumbies debut during the 2012 Super Rugby season against the Sharks in Canberra.

Sio was educated at Sydney's Trinity Grammar School, where he achieved the roles of Captain of Rugby and School Vice-Captain in 2009. Later that year, he represented NSW Schoolboys, Australia A Schoolboys and Australian Schoolboys.

Sio represented the Australia under 20 at the 2011 IRB Junior World Championship.

Sio was named in the Wallabies 31-man Squad to take on the British and Irish Lions in their three test series. Despite being named in the squad, he was allowed to play in the Brumbies game against the Lions, performing admirably, to become the first Australian provincial side to defeat the Lions in 42 years.

Sio made his Wallabies debut at loosehead prop against the All Blacks in Sydney during the 2013 Rugby Championship. He would go on the make his run on debut against the All Blacks again in Sydney during the 2015 Rugby Championship after two impressive cameos from the bench against South Africa and Argentina. He was named in the Wallabies 31-man squad for the 2015 Rugby World Cup.

Scott would make his debut for Manu Samoa in November of 2025 against Namibia after a 3 year stand down period having last played for the Wallabies in September of 2022, going on to help them qualify for the 2027 World Cup taking place in Australia.

He is the son of former Manu Samoa prop David Sio who played in the 1991 Rugby World Cup. Samoa played against Scotland in that tournament at the time of Scott's birth and he was named in recognition of the occasion)

On 17 August 2022, Sio signed with the Exeter Chiefs who compete in the Premiership Rugby competition on a long-term deal for the 2022-23 season.

On June 23 2026, Sio was announced by Cardiff Rugby on a long-term contract for the upcoming 2026-27 season.

== Super Rugby statistics ==
As of 22 July 2016

Season	Team	Games	Starts	Sub	Mins	Tries	Cons	Pens	Drops	Points	Yel	Red
2012	Brumbies	4	0	4	92	0	0	0	0	0	0	0
2013	Brumbies	18	12	6	1050	1	0	0	0	5	1	0
2014	Brumbies	15	15	0	994	1	0	0	0	5	0	0
2015	Brumbies	13	13	0	844	0	0	0	0	0	0	0
2016	Brumbies	15	13	2	781	1	0	0	0	5	0	0
Total		65	53	12	3761	3	0	0	0	15	1	0
