= Angus Bell =

Australian rugby union player

Angus Stephen Bell
- Born: 4 October 2000 (age 26) Sydney, New South Wales, Australia
- Height: 193 cm (6 ft 4 in)
- Weight: 127 kg (280 lb; 20 st 0 lb)
- School: Newington College
- Notable relative: Mark Bell (father)

Rugby union career
- Position: Prop
Senior career
Years	Team	Apps	(Points)
2019–2020	NSW Country Eagles	5	(5)
2025–2026	Ulster	17	(10)
- Correct as of 22 May 2026
Super Rugby
Years	Team	Apps	(Points)
2019–	Waratahs	55	(30)
- Correct as of 31 May 2025
International career
Years	Team	Apps	(Points)
2019	Australia U20	5	(0)
2020–	Australia	60	(30)
- Correct as of 17 October 2026
Medal record
Men's rugby union
Representing Australia
Oceania U20 Championship
Winner	2019 Gold Coast
Junior World Cup
Runner-up	2019 Argentina

Angus Stephen Bell (born 4 October 2000) is an Australian rugby union player who plays loose head prop for Ulster in the United Rugby Championship, on sabbatical from the New South Wales Waratahs in Super Rugby, and for the Australian national team.

The son of former Australian international hooker Mark Bell, he captained Australia at schools and under-18 level, and was part of the Australia under-20 that was runner-up in the 2019 under-20 World Championship. he made his debut for the Waratahs in 2019, and his first start in February 2020. He made his international debut for Australia on 7 November 2020, coming on as an injury replacement for James Slipper in the 40th minute of a test match versus the New Zealand All Blacks in Brisbane. Despite injury issues which made him consider retirement, he made his 50th appearance for the Waratahs in April 2025.

He joined Irish side Ulster on a six-month sabbatical in December 2025, ending in May 2026.
