= Mark Bakewell =

Australian rugby union forwards coach

- Born: Mark Bakewell Christchurch, New Zealand

Rugby union career
- Position: Forwards Coach
Amateur team(s)
Years	Team	Apps	(Points)
1983;1995	Eastern Suburbs		
Coaching career
- Years: Team
- 1995–2001: Eastern Suburbs
- 2001–03: CA Brive
- 2003–05: AS Beziers
- 2006–09: Bath
- 2010–11: Melbourne Rebels
- 2012–13: Tonga
- 2012,2013,2014: Eastern Suburbs
- 2014–2015: Suntory Sungoliath
- 2016–18: Bristol
- 2018–2019: Leicester Tigers
- Correct as of 28 December 2019

Mark Bakewell is an Australian rugby union forwards coach. Bakewell has travelled extensively in a coaching career spanning over 29 years; he has coached Eastern Suburbs Sydney University and Melbourne Rebels as well as Strength and Conditioning coach for The Wallabies in 1996 in Australia; Was head coach in Brive and Béziers in France; Forwards coach with the Tongan national team; Suntory Sungoliath in Japan; as well as Bath, Bristol and Leicester Tigers in England being the only Southern Hemisphere forwards coach to coach 3 Premiership forward packs

== Early life and playing career ==
Bakewell was born in Christchurch, New Zealand, and began playing rugby aged four before moving to Australia at seven. He played & coached more than 400 gamesforEastern Suburbsin Sydneyplaying prop and in the backrow. He is the only living person to have played and coached more than 100 first grade games for Easts In 1996 he became an Australian citizen.

== Coaching career ==
Bakewell began his coaching career at Eastern Suburbs, his old club, as a forwards and strength and conditioning coach in 1995. In 1996 he worked with Australia underGreg Smith as their strength and conditioning coach preparing them for their 1996 undefeated European tour and became head coach of Eastern Suburbs in 1999 and was named New South Wales coach of the year in 2000 after leading Easts to 15 consecutive wins, being the most consecutive wins in their 100 year history . In 2001 he joined CA Brive as head coach in France's Pro D2, he led them to promotion in 2003 but then left following a contract dispute to join AS Béziers.

Following two seasons with Béziers Bakewelljoined Bath in July 2006 as forwards coach under Steve Meehan. He has described the three years he spent at Bath as his favourite job, with Bath finishing in the title play off positions in both 2008 and 2009In 2008 Bath also won The European Challenge Cup .Post Bath he returned to Australia to be forwards coach of the Melbourne Rebels in their inaugural 2011 season Super Rugby.

In 2012 he joined Tonga as forwards coach and was part of the coaching team when Tonga beat Scotland in Scotland.In 2012 he also returned to Eastern Suburbs as head coach until early 2014 but quickly moved on in April to Japan joining Suntory Sungoliath. After two seasons in Japan, In February 2016, Bakewell returned to England to replace Steve Borthwick at Bristol in England's second division. While at Bristol Bakewell saw the side promoted in 2016 but then relegated from Premiership Rugby the following year.

On 14 February 2018 Bakewell joined Leicester Tigers to work as forwards coach under fellow Australian Matt O'Connor.

BBC Radio Leicester reported that Bakewell has left his role on 10 December 2019, with the club eventually confirming his departure on 18 December.
