= Jim Cross (rugby union) =

Rugby player (1930–2024)

- Full name: James Robert Cross
- Born: 27 October 1930 Sydney, Australia
- Died: 17 August 2024 (aged 93)

Rugby union career
- Position: Hooker
International career
Years	Team	Apps	(Points)
1955	Australia	3	(0)

James Robert Cross (27 October 1930 – 17 August 2024) was an Australian rugby union international.

== Biography ==
Cross was born in Sydney and attended North Sydney Boys High School.

A hooker, Cross made his first-grade debut for Northern Suburbs in 1954. The following year, with no state representative experience, he gained Wallabies selection for the tour of New Zealand. He played all three Test matches against the All Blacks, which included a win at Eden Park. These remained his only Wallabies caps and he was succeeded in the side by Jim Brown. He continued at Northern Suburbs until 1964 and finished with a club record of 169 first-grade games.

Cross died on 17 August 2024, at the age of 93.

== See also ==
- List of Australia national rugby union players
