= Tony Daly =

Australian rugby union footballer

- Born: 7 March 1966 (age 60) West Pymble, Australia
- Height: 1.78 m (5 ft 10 in)
- Weight: 103 kg (227 lb)

Rugby union career
- Position: Prop
Amateur team(s)
Years	Team	Apps	(Points)
- Eastern Suburbs RUFC
International career
Years	Team	Apps	(Points)
1989–1995	Australia	41	(17)
- Correct as of 23 February 2021

Tony Daly (born 7 March 1966 in West Pymble, Australia) is a former Australian rugby union footballer who represented Australia in 41 Test matches. He played for Eastern Suburbs, Gordon, Randwick, Manly, Brothers and Saracens at prop. He represented Australia between 1989 and 1995. One of the four tries he ever scored for Australia was in the 1991 Rugby World Cup final against England which Australia won 12–6. Daly also went with Australia to the 1995 Rugby World Cup and played several Bledisloe Cup matches against the All Blacks. As well as representing Australia, Daly also played for New South Wales and Queensland. He has continued to be involved with rugby since his retirement, playing briefly for San Francisco Golden Gate.

In 2006, Daly was slated to play with the Classic Wallabies in Bermuda. However, due to an incident on the plane where Daly was accused of stealing cash from fellow passengers, he was detained by the FBI during a stopover at Los Angeles and sent back to Australia. Daly informed reporters his visitation rights in the United States were withdrawn for an unrelated prior driving offence stemming from not attending court regarding a 2004 car accident.

Daly has coached several suburban rugby teams in New South Wales.
