= Eric Bardsley =

Australian rugby union player (1903–1958)

Rick Bardsley
- Born: Eric John Bardsley; 1903 Sydney, New South Wales, Australia
- Died: 1958 (aged 54–55) Sydney, New South Wales, Australia
- School: Newington College

Rugby union career
- Position: Number 8
International career
Years	Team	Apps	(Points)
1928	Australia	3	

Eric [Rick] John Bardsley (1903–1958) was an Australian Rugby Union player and represented for the Wallabies three times.

== Early life ==
Bardsley attended Newington College (1918–1923) and played Rugby in the 1st XV for three years.

== Rugby career ==
Bardsley played in the back row and represented Northern Suburbs Rugby Club in 139 1st Grade games. In 1928 he toured New Zealand and played in three Test matches.

== Club controversy ==
In 1942 Bardsley admitted to sending food parcels to Russia and after his patriotism to Australia was questioned by fellow members of Norths Rugby, he and his brother-in-law, fellow Wallaby Wal Mackney, resigned from the club.
