= Mark Bell (rugby union) =

Australian rugby union international

- Full name: Mark Douglas Bell
- Born: 5 September 1968 (age 58) Sydney, Australia
- School: St Joseph's College
- Notable relative: Angus Bell (son)

Rugby union career
- Position: Hooker
International career
Years	Team	Apps	(Points)
1996	Australia	1	(0)

Mark Douglas Bell (born 5 September 1968) is an Australian former rugby union international.

Bell, born in Sydney, attended St Joseph's College, Hunters Hill, where he featured in the 1st XV premiership team of 1986 which went undefeated. He subsequently won a place on the Australian Schools side for a tour of New Zealand.

A hooker, Bell played for Northern Suburbs and earned his first Wallabies call up in 1993 for a tour of France, as a back up for Phil Kearns. By 1996, he was considered around fourth in line to play hooker for the Wallabies, but after a series of injuries to his positional rivals gained a cap in a Test against Canada at Ballymore Stadium, Brisbane.

Bell is the father of Wallabies prop Angus Bell.

== See also ==
- List of Australia national rugby union players
