= Ray Colbert =

- Full name: Raymond Colbert
- Born: 10 May 1931 Brisbane, Australia
- Died: 3 December 1989 (aged 58)
- School: Toowoomba Grammar School

Rugby union career
- Position: Fullback
International career
Years	Team	Apps	(Points)
1952–53	Australia	6	(6)

Raymond Colbert (10 May 1931 — 3 December 1989) was an Australian rugby union international.

A Toowoomba Grammar School product, Colbert was a member of the school's athletics, cricket, rugby union and swimming teams. He was on the 1st XV which went undefeated to win the 1948 GPS premiership.

Colbert, primarily a fullback, made his Queensland representative debut as a 19-year old. After relocating to Sydney for work, he played his rugby for Drummoyne, switching his allegiance to NSW when he appeared for the state in 1952.

Capped six times for the Wallabies, Colbert debuted in a 1952 home Test against Fiji. He toured New Zealand later that year and South Africa in 1953, before losing his place in the side to Dick Tooth.

== See also ==
- List of Australia national rugby union players
