= Francis Cullimore =

New Zealand rugby league and rugby union footballer

Personal information
- Born: 13 December 1976 (age 49) Brisbane, Queensland, Australia

Playing information
Club
Years	Team	Pld	T	G	FG	P
	Illawarra Steelers
	Manly Sea Eagles
	Total	0	0	0	0	0
Representative
Years	Team	Pld	T	G	FG	P
	Junior Kiwis
	Auckland Warriors
	New Zealand Māori

Rugby union career
Senior career
Years	Team	Apps	(Points)
–	NSW A		
–	Waratahs		
National sevens team
Years	Team		Comps
–	Australia 7s		

Francis Cullimore (born 13 December 1976) is an Australian-born New Zealand former elite athlete. He is a five time multiple sporting professional & Rugby Union/league dual international.

Born in Brisbane, Australia, Cullimore moved to Auckland when he was 7 after his father died, settling in Northland. He grew up in Whangārei, New Zealand, and attended Tikipunga High School. He played rugby league for the Junior Kiwis and was signed by the Auckland Warriors to a two-year scholarship. Cullimore represented New Zealand in rugby league sevens, playing in the Rugby League Coca-Cola World Sevens tournament, and also selected for New Zealand Māori. Cullimore then moved to Australia and played lower grades for the Illawarra Steelers and a brief stint with Manly Sea Eagles.

He decided to switch codes, playing rugby union for the New South Wales under-21s NSW A and then moving onto super rugby with the Waratahs, debuting in 2001. He also became a dual international after making the Australian men's 7s team and represented Australia in rugby sevens.

He was also selected to go to the 2010 Vancouver Winter Olympics with the Australian bobsleigh team after a successful North American training camp. Unfortunately, a leg injury ruling him out. Cullimore then trained and fought as a mixed martial arts fighter turning pro with a 3–1 record.

He later trained in natural bodybuilding, placing 3rd at the Australian Nationals ANB & International Natural Bodybuilding Association heavyweight divisions and appeared in the Australian television show Australian Ninja Warrior in seasons 1 and 2, making the semi-finals.
