= John Bosler =

- Born: John Morgan Bosler; 4 February 1933 Sydney

Rugby union career
- Position: scrum-half
International career
Years	Team	Apps	(Points)
1953	Wallabies	1	(0)

John Morgan Bosler (born 4 February 1933) was an Australian rugby union player.

Bosler, a scrum-half, was born in Sydney, and grew up in Dover Heights. He attended Rose Bay Public Primary School and was the only schoolboy player (League) to be awarded a Ray Norman Gold Badge for excellence in all-round football ability. He went to Sydney Boys High School, graduating in 1950, where he was selected for both CHS and GPS Firsts. Bosler is generally thought to be one of the top five players in the history of GPS rugby. He played halfback for Australia against South Africa in a Sydney test and against Fiji, and toured with the Wallabies in South Africa where the South African press awarded him the title of Best Scrumhalf in the World.
