= Spencer Brown (rugby union, born 1921) =

Australian rugby union player

- Born: Spencer William Brown; 18 October 1921 Atherton, Queensland
- Died: c. 1973

Rugby union career
- Position: fly-half
International career
| Years | Team | Apps | (Points) |
| 1953 | Wallabies | 3 | (0) |

Spencer William Brown (18 October 1921 – c. 1973) was a rugby union player who represented Australia.

Brown, a fly-half, was born in Atherton, Queensland and claimed a total of 3 international rugby caps for Australia.
