= Thomas Sweeney (rugby union) =

Australia international rugby union player (1929-2017)

- Born: Thomas Leo Sweeney c. 1929 Brisbane, Queensland
- Died: 17 February 2017 (aged 87)

Rugby union career
- Position: fullback
International career
| Years | Team | Apps | (Points) |
| 1953 | Wallabies | 1 | (3) |

Thomas Leo Sweeney (c. 1929 – 17 February 2017) was a rugby union player who represented Australia.

Sweeney, a fullback, was born in Brisbane, Queensland and claimed 1 international rugby cap for Australia.
