= Northern Suburbs Rugby Club =

Australian rugby union club, based on Sydney's Lower North Shore

Northern Suburbs Rugby Football Club
- Union: New South Wales Rugby Union
- Founded: 1900
- Location: North Sydney, Australia
- Region: Lower North Shore
- Ground: North Sydney Oval (Capacity: 20,000)
- Coach: Zak Beer
- Captain: Harry Burey
- League: Shute Shield
Team kit

Official website
- www.northsrugby.com.au

Northern Suburbs Rugby Football Club is a rugby union club based on Sydney's Lower North Shore, that was formed in 1900 under the newly introduced districts club scheme, where players qualified on a residency basis. Outside of schools and universities, Northern Suburbs (along with Eastern Suburbs club) is the oldest continuously operating rugby union club in Australia, having played in every single season since 1920.

The club competes in the Shute Shield competition run by the New South Wales Rugby Union (NSWRU).The club has produced 42 Wallaby representatives. The club's home ground is the historic North Sydney Oval on the North Shore of Sydney. The ground has been a venue for both codes of rugby and for cricket over more than a century.

== Club information ==
Club Name: Northern Suburbs Rugby Football Club
Nickname: The Shoremen, Norths, The Red and Blacks
Founded: 1900
Home stadium: North Sydney Oval
Head coach: Zak Beer
Captain: Harry Burey
Vice Captain: Angus Sinclair
Uniform colors: Red & Black
Premiership Titles: 7 (1933, 1935, 1960, 1963, 1964, 1975, 2016)

== Club history ==
=== North Shore Rugby Clubs (1872-1899) ===
Rugby on the lower North Shore is over 150 years old. The St Leonards FC was founded in 1872 and remained one of Sydney's senior clubs until the mid 1880s. Council minutes reveal that this North Shore club played on a paddock adjoining Holterman's Tower, the present location of Shore School. The club later transferred to St Leonard's Park. In 1889 the Pirates FC was founded and nicknamed 'The Shoremen'. The Pirates won the First Grade Premiership in 1898 and the R.A.S. Trophy in 1897/8/9, defeating the Wallaroo FC 10-nil in the third final.

=== Founding of the Northern Suburbs Rugby Club (1900-14) ===
In 1900 the Northern Suburbs Rugby Club was founded as the North Sydney District Rugby Football Club under the Metropolitan RU's (MRU) new residential based scheme. All the footballers in Sydney were required to play with their local club. The new North Sydney club covered "the electorates of St. Leonards, Willoughby, Warringah, and part of electorate of Ryde as is included in municipality of Hunter’s Hill.” The claim that the 1899 clubs Wallaroo and Pirate merged to form North Sydney in 1900 is at odds with the practicalities of the residential based scheme. Less than half of the members of the club's first team in 1900 were former Wallaroo or Pirate players.

North Sydney were the first district club to affiliate with the MRU in the initial eight-club district competition. The date was 5 April, ahead of Wests on 11 April and Easts on 12 April. Jim Henderson, commemorated in the present premiership trophies for third and fourth grades, was North's first secretary, and the club's first cap was winger Charlie White, who played in the first-ever test-match in 1899 against the British Isles and then in the first Australia v New Zealand test in 1903.

The North Sydney club in 1900 registered their colours as green, cardinal, and gold as per the North Sydney district cricket club, however could not locate a suitable rugby jersey manufacturer/supplier until 1907. In the interim generic playing stripes in colours readily available locally and not in use by the other districts were used, with blue and red (1900 to 1904) and then black and red (1905 to 1906). In 1913 the club decided to revert to red and black which became permanent.

The name Northern Suburbs first appeared late in the 1914 season when the MRU announced plans for 1915 that included a merger between the North Sydney club with Manly RUFC, however this was abandoned with the outbreak of World War One. Club rugby competitions throughout Sydney were suspended for the duration of the war (1915-18).

=== Between The Wars Era ===
With the first grade club competition resumed Norths took part in 1919 trial games, but was dramatically refused entry by the NSWRU on the grounds the team was non-competitive. The club was readmitted the following year and has played every season since, making them and Eastern Suburbs the oldest ever-present rugby union clubs in Australia outside of the schools and universities.

While the Norths reserve grade XV won the club's first premiership in 1925, the first-grade team was regularly found at the bottom end of the competition table. With the location and construction of the Sydney Harbour Bridge impacting upon what were once residential burroughs of North Sydney, to expand the club's catchment area the new club name Northern Suburbs was adopted at the start of 1928, aimed at bringing in players and supporters from Mosman, Gordon and Chatswood.

Under the guidance of one-eyed (lost in action in France) Fred Aarons, the club's prospects improved. The year 1928 saw a young recruit arrive, one Gavin John Andrews, who is now enshrined as the club's greatest treasure, Bon Andrews, after whom North Sydney No. 2 Oval is named. In 1929 under its new name Northern Suburbs won its first ever Club Championship.

The first of North's two 'golden eras' occurred in the early 1930s. The club's initial first-grade premiership was in 1933, beating Manly 8–6, and again beating Manly in 1935 by 22–5.

The inaugural fourth-grade competition in 1932, back-to-back Club Championships in 1934 and 1935 and seven other minor grade premierships, highlighted the first half of the decade.

Australian caps in the 1930s were 'Big' Tom Perrin, Waratah Sid King, ex-Kiwi Bill Hemingway, dual international Wal Mackney (stroke of the rowing eight at the Berlin Olympic Games, half Mike Gibbons and Eric Hutchinson who, with brother Frank, was killed while serving in World War II.

=== Post World War Two ===
The Red and Blacks took some time to get back on top after the war, winning only the Third Grade Premiership in 1947, the Fourths a year later and nothing in the fifties. In 1947 Roger Cornforth played the first of his two Tests against the All Blacks. Controversially omitted from the 1947–48 Wallabies to the British Isles, this then allowed him to represent Australia at the 1948 Olympics in London at water polo. He also played against the 1950 British Lions.

Peter Rothwell, Jim Cross and John Carroll added their names to North's honour roll in the 1950s and by 1960 John Thornett and Rod Phelps had joined Norths to improve its fortunes when once again defeating Manly, 21–3, Norths won its third First Grade Premiership and fourth Club Championship and its second Golden Era was ushered in.

Three years later, the Red and Blacks beat Sydney University back-to-back for the 1963 and '64 First Grade Premierships, together with the Club Championship for those years.

In 1964 Norths won three out of the four grade premierships, a rare feat until Randwick's run in the 1980s. In all, eight premierships were won in the 1960s and three Club Championships. From the Thornett and Phelps days, Roy Prosser (for several years Australia's most capped prop), Les Austin, Andy Town, John 'Sparrow' Dowse, Hugh Rose, Reg Smith, Garrick Fay, Peter Carson and Andy Stewart kept Norths alive in the test arena. Others, including Peter Johnston, Keith Henry, playwright and actor Warwick Moss, Peter Medway, Dennis Turnbull, Graeme Ewens, five-eight Jim Allen, Wallaby David Codey who played his Colts Rugby at Norths and ex- Rugby Club president, Russ Tulloch, played for the State. Russ also toured to Great Britain with the Wallabies. There was also the Westralian-Kiwi Bob Thompson.

The club won eight premierships during the 1970s including First Grade in 1975. Norths also toured Singapore and Malaysia in 1970 (7 games), England and Wales in 1973 (7 games), USA West Coast in 1976 (6 games) and England, the Netherlands, Belgium and France in 1977 (8 games). By 1981 when, unhappily relegated to Second Division, Norths stood fourth on the list of premierships won in all senior grades in the First Division.

There was no doubt that Norths were unlucky to be relegated in 1981. Even though the club went down, it still won the Fourth Grade Premiership. The criterion then was based on the First Grade team and Norths had a disastrous year, scoring only four wins and a draw.

Norths were relegated with Hornsby, despite being just one point behind Sydney University and, in the club championship, was actually ahead of Warringah, Sydney Uni, St George and Hornsby.

Norths went on to win the Sydney Rugby Union (second Division) Club Championship in 1986, 1987 and 1988. Finally, after winning it again in 1989, Norths won promotion back into First Division.

However, also during this period the Club undertook two overseas tours. In 1984 there were 6 games against teams in England, Scotland, Wales and Ireland. The club returned to Europe at the end of the 1988, with fixtures in England, France, Belgium and Italy. Some described it as an arduous four-week tour.

In the eight years out of Sydney's top division through the 1980s, Norths won 12 premierships including three in first grade as well as four club championships.

In addition to those grade rugby successes, a tremendous effort was made to develop the Colts and 12 premierships were won in various grades, which formed a sound basis for the return to First Division.

=== 1990s ===
In its first year back, 1990, Norths finished eighth out of 11. In 1991 North's fourth-grade players were semi-finalists and its second-grade Colts were premiers —a first-ever senior Colts win.

The season also saw North's first addition to its Australian honours list since 1979—Richard Tombs was selected in the victorious Wallaby World Cup squad. But he had to wait until 1992 to play his first two tests, against Scotland, at home.

The 1993 season saw seven teams reach the semis, with Reserve Grade and Colts Seconds and Thirds winning premierships. There was also an overseas tour to the US, playing games in Los Angeles, New Orleans and New York.

1994 saw the merger of North's two clubs (licensed and rugby). The Alfred Street properties were disposed of. The club purchased and moved to Christie Street, St Leonards location. Third and Fourth Grade won premierships that year, as did the Second Grade Colts. Richard Tombs won the inaugural Sydney Morning Herald 'Rugby Player of the Year Award' in 1995, with Nick Harvey being the youngest winner of the AAMI Medal. Fifth Grade won a premiership, and the club toured France, Belgium, Germany and UK at the end of the season.

1996 saw the beginning of professional rugby. Sixth Grade won the Premiership which was the final year that grade was run in the premier competition.

In 1997 the Club lost its Patron and Honorary Life Member, George Marshall. The same year, members voted to change the club's accounting year to close on 30 June annually.

1997 also saw the arrival of Dennis Brown of New Zealand as head coach attracting such players as the 'bushwackers' dean et al. Plus a contingent of northern hemisphere players such as Fintan 'clinton napkin' Godkin, Linus 'why was I invited to the 1st grade trail' Mortlock the party even included Welsh legends Barry John and Carwyn James. David McComisky and Andrew Jackson later left the Norths. During that period, the club recorded profits from its bar sales, which were used to fund new equipment and uniforms. The 1998 season proved to be the renown since 1975 with a string of notable statistics. These included all five grade teams in the Grand Final, winning Second and Fifth Grade premierships. Norths won The Herald Club of the Year Award, and Michael Sykes the Club Player of the Year.

Keith Gleeson won the Ken Catchpole Medal (Best & Fairest) in 1999, and at season's end a Club team toured Spain and Portugal. The 90's saw quite a number of players achieving representative honours. Jim Allen, Dominic Vaughan, Mick Kearins, Rod (Rambo) Clark, Sam Domoni, Richard Tombs, Mark Bell, Nick Harvey, Darren Junee, Keith Gleeson and Graeme Bond all played for the N.S.W Waratahs with Bond also playing at the ACT Brumbies in 1999 with Troy Jaques and former 1991 N.S.W Waratah Craig Wells. The representative careers of Ben Darwin and Al Baxter also began to emerge.

=== 2000s ===
The year 2000 saw Northern Suburbs celebrate 100 years with the Norths Centenary Dinner, a black-tie affair at the Wentworth Hotel with over 300 people in attendance.

The 2001 rugby highlight was obviously the success of the first-grade team securing the minor premiership for the first time since 1960. The season also saw the Wallaby debuts of Ben Darwin and Graeme Bond, with Al Baxter and Francis Cullimore gaining Super 12 contracts.

During the year the Bon Andrews Bequest was established with the $25,000 he left to the club. This money is used to provide educational assistance to talented young players. During the year Vince Arena created a little more history for the club by playing his 300th match for Norths, and on retirement is second only to Bon Andrews in club games.

Fifth Grade won the John Thornett Cup in 2002, and First Grade Colts made it to the grand final for the first time since 1977. Milton Thaiday and Lachlan McKay were offered Super 12 contracts, and First Grade finished second in the Shute Shield, and sixth in the inaugural Tooheys New Cup.

In 2003 the season kicked off for some with a tour to Japan. First Grade finished fourth in the Tooheys New Cup, and captain Mark Challender achieved the SMH's ˜Club Player of the Year' award. Kevin Horan was voted ˜Club Coach of the Year'. All four Colts teams qualified for the semis, with First and Fourths losing narrowly in both grand finals. In the Rugby World Cup, Ben Darwin and Al Baxter played for the Wallabies (Al having made his debut earlier in the season against the All Blacks), and Tonga Leaʻaetoa and Sai Latu represented Tonga. And Keith Gleeson played for Ireland.

Early 2005 saw Northern Suburbs' club house undergo extensive renovations to reopen in June as Cabana Bar and Lounge. Cabana Bar has since cemented itself as a central venue to Sydney's north shore night life and a strong financial building block for the club.

2008 was a year of mixed emotions for the club. The colts teams had a disappointing year with some upheaval in the coaching staff and a reduction in player numbers compared to the year before. In hand with the reduction in young blood entering the club, Northern Suburbs were sad to see the passing away of one of their greatest treasures from the 1960s and 70s in Vale Roy Prosser. Roy still holds the club record for the highest number of First Grade games at 220. The Grand Final for 2008 saw Second Grade come from fifth on the table to claim the Premiership after being Runners Up the year before. The Second Grade Coaches Tony Horan and Grahame O'Donnell received a further reward in being promoted to coaching First Grade for the 2009 season.

2010 saw Norths, Waratahs and Wallabies front rower Al Baxter become the most capped New South Wales front rower when he received his 100th cap in the Super 14. An end of season tour to the United States of America was a success, playing New York Athletic Club, Gentleman of Aspen Rugby Club and Las Vegas Blackjacks.

=== 2010s and onwards ===
In 2012 Norths 4th grade team secured the Henderson Cup in beating Manly at Concord Oval 21–0. All grade teams featured in the finals with 5th grade runners up for the John Thornett cup against Sydney University (played under lights at Sydney University Oval no.1). 1st Colts played in the Grand Final at Forshaw Rugby Park.

In 2015 Head Coach, Simon Cron was awarded Coach of the Year and Will Miller was runner up in the Ken Catchpole Medal.

In 2016 Norths broke a 41-year drought to claim the highly elusive Shute Shield after defeating Sydney University 28–15 at North Sydney Oval. Pandemonium ensued after Norths scored late in the Grand Final with thousands of fans flooding the field in celebration. Captain Will Miller was awarded the Ken Catchpole Medal in addition to Player of the Finals Series honours. Breakout centre Irae Simone was awarded Shute Shield Rookie of the Year for his performances over the course of the season, he then went on and starred in the now Sydney Rays NRC campaign, falling short in the semi-finals and was awarded a contract with NSW Waratahs. Norths' Colts 1 side also made their respective final, ironically, going down to Sydney University at Forshaw Rugby Park.

In 2017 Norths featured in the 1st and 4th Grade Grand Finals at North Sydney Oval. In February Norths beat Brisbane Brothers to win the Australian Club Championship.

2018 saw 4th and 3rd Grade both play in Grand Finals at North Sydney Oval. 3rd Grade were victorious.

== Australian representatives ==
- 1903 Charlie White
- 1903 Dinny Lutge
- 1905 Lancelot Smith
- 1905 Blair Swannell
- 1907 Norman Row
- 1913 Bryan Hughes
- 1921 Onslow Humphreys
- 1921 Charlie Fox
- 1921 Dr Darby Loudon
- 1922 Roy Cooney
- 1925 Colin Shaw
- 1925 Ken Tarleton
- 1926 Sydney King
- 1928 Eric Bardsley
- 1931 Tom Perrin
- 1932 Bill Hemingway
- 1933 Walter Mackney
- 1936 Eric "Mike" Gibbons
- 1937 Eric Hutchinson
- 1947 Roger Cornforth
- 1951 Peter Rothwell
- 1953 Jim Walsh
- 1955 Jim Cross
- 1956 Rod Phelps
- 1958 John Carroll
- 1958 John Thornett
- 1961 John Dowse
- 1962 Roy Prosser
- 1962 Les Austin
- 1967 Hugh Rose
- 1971 Reg Smith
- 1971 Garrick Fay
- 1979 Peter Carson
- 1979 Andy Stewart
- 1991 Richard Tombs
- 1996 Mark Bell
- 2000 Troy Jaques
- 2001 Ben Darwin
- 2001 Graeme Bond
- 2003 Al Baxter
- 2005 Adam Ashley-Cooper
- 2006 Cameron Shepherd
- 2007 Sam Norton-Knight
- 2013 Scott Sio

== International representatives ==
- Carlos Blanco
- Brian Doyle
- Kitcho Evangelidis
- Keith Gleeson
- Tyler Hotson
- Tonga Leaʻaetoa
- James Price
- Michael Rodas
- David Schuster
- David Sio
- Angus Taʻavao

== Australian 7s representatives ==
- Cameron Clark (2016 Rio Olympics)
- Francis Cullimore
- Sam Figg
- Jack Grant
- William Miller
- Sam Myers
- Jesse Parahi (2016 Rio Olympics)
- John Porch (2016 Rio Olympics)
- Peter Schuster
- Andrew Smith
- Stephan Van Der Walt
- Michael Wells
