= James Joyce (rugby union) =

- Born: James Emerton Joyce

Rugby union career
- Position: lock
International career
Years	Team	Apps	(Points)
1903	Australia	1	(0)

James Emerton Joyce was a rugby union player who represented Australia.

Joyce, a lock, claimed one international rugby cap for Australia. His debut game was against New Zealand, at Sydney, on 15 August 1903.
