= Jack Carroll (rugby union) =

- Born: John Charles Carroll; 14 September 1925 Sydney
- Died: 27 June 2018 (aged 92)

Rugby union career
- Position: number 8
International career
Years	Team	Apps	(Points)
1953	Wallabies	1	(0)

John Charles "Jack" Carroll (14 September 1925 – 27 June 2018) was a rugby union player who represented Australia.

Carroll, a number 8, was born in Sydney and claimed 1 international rugby cap for Australia.
