= John Manning (rugby union) =

- Born: John Manning c. 1880 Sydney

Rugby union career
- Position: fly-half
International career
Years	Team	Apps	(Points)
1904	Australia	1	(0)

John Manning (born c. 1880) was a rugby union player who represented Australia.

Manning, a fly-half, was born in Sydney and claimed one international rugby cap for Australia, playing against Great Britain, at Brisbane, on 23 July 1904.
