= Jack O'Donnell (rugby union) =

- Born: John O'Donnell c. 1877
- Died: c. 1956
- Notable relative: Iggy O'Donnell brother

Rugby union career
- Position: hooker
International career
Years	Team	Apps	(Points)
1899	Australia	1	(0)

John O'Donnell (c. 1877 – c. 1956) was a rugby union player who represented Australia.

O'Donnell, a hooker, claimed 1 international rugby cap for Australia. His debut game was against Great Britain, at Sydney, on 12 August 1899.
