= Frank Futter =

Australian rugby union player

- Born: Francis Cuthbert Futter c. 1880 Cootamundra, New South Wales
- Died: 13 November 1941

Rugby union career
- Position: centre
International career
Years	Team	Apps	(Points)
1904	Australia	1	(0)

Francis Cuthbert "Frank" Futter (c. 1880 – 13 November 1941) was a rugby union player who represented Australia.

Futter, a centre, was born in Cootamundra, New South Wales and claimed one international rugby cap for Australia, playing against Great Britain, at Sydney, on 30 July 1904.
