= Jim Walsh (rugby union) =

Australia international rugby union player (1926–1996)

- Born: James Justin Walsh; 23 January 1926 Orange, New South Wales
- Died: 21 August 1996 (aged 70)

Rugby union career
- Position: hooker
International career
Years	Team	Apps	(Points)
1953	Wallabies	4	(0)

James Justin Walsh (23 January 1926 – 21 August 1996) was a rugby union player who represented Australia.

Walsh, a hooker, was born in Orange, New South Wales and claimed a total of 4 international rugby caps for Australia.
