= Drummoyne DRFC =

Australian rugby union club, based in Drummoyne, NSW

(Australia) Drummoyne
- Full name: Drummoyne District Rugby Football Club
- Nickname: Dirty Reds
- Founded: 1916; 110 years ago
- Location: Drummoyne, Sydney, Australia
- Ground(s): Drummoyne Oval, (Bayswater Rd)
- League: NSWSRU
Team kit

Official website
- drummoynerugby.com.au

The Drummoyne District Rugby Football Club (Drummoyne DRFC) is a rugby union club based in Drummoyne, New South Wales, in Sydney, Australia. The club was founded in 1916 as the Glebe-Balmain District Football Club, being a merger of existing district clubs Glebe and Balmain. In 1931 the name was altered to Drummoyne DRFC. The present day Drummoyne DRFC competes prominently in the First Division of the NSW Suburban Rugby Union.

== History ==
The name Drummoyne DRFC was adopted in 1931 by the then Shute Shield competition side Glebe-Balmain DFC. The Glebe-Balmain DFC was established in 1916 as a war-time merger of the 1900 founded district clubs Glebe and Balmain. Both of these suburbs had rugby union clubs in the 1870s-90s, however the two clubs founded in 1900 under the city's district scheme and residential rules were entirely new bodies.

In 1917 the Glebe-Balmain DFC attempted to arrange a match with Balmain rugby league club. Following the end of the war the Glebe-Balmain DFC entered the 1919 first grade club competition (now Shute Shield). The merged club's colours were a combination of maroon jersey (Glebe) and black and gold socks (Balmain). The Glebe club's maroon jersey had in the early 1900s given rise to the club's nickname of "Dirty Reds".

Over the 1920s the change in the suburban demographics of the Glebe and Balmain parts of Sydney saw players, training, meetings and support increasingly related to the growing residential area of Drummoyne. In 1931 the club adopted its new name as the Drummoyne DRFC and changed to a scarlet colour jersey, and began playing home games at the recently renovated Drummoyne Oval in 1932.

The club has produced many representative players, the first Rugby Union team to leave Australian shores for an overseas tour, the historic 1882 NSW team to NZ, included 3 players from the Balmain Club: M.H.Howard, R.W.Thallon and C.Hawkins. In 1909-10 Bill McKell, later to become Australia's Governor General, played on the wing for Balmain and the very first Wallaby Captain, Dr.H.Moran of the 1908 Australian side, served as Balmain's president in 1911-12.

In 1979 the club was moved to the Second Division competition, returning to the Shute Shield first grade in 1991. The club now competes in the First Division of the NSW Suburban Rugby Union.

== Honours ==
=== Sydney Premiership ===
- Shute Shield: (2) 1925, 1936

==== Division 1 Championships ====
- Kentwell Cup: (8) 1947, 2000, 2004, 2006, 2007, 2008, 2010, 2012 and 2020.
- Division 1 Club Championship - Bruce Graham Shield: (3) 2004, 2008, 2012 and 2020.
- Burke Cup: (2) 2000, 2004 and 2019
- Whiddon Cup: (3) 2001, 2015, 2017
- Sutherland Cup: (1) 2010

==== Division 2 Championships ====
- Barraclough Cup: (1) 1999
- Stockdale Cup: (1) 1999

==== Division 3 Championships ====
- Division 3 Club Championship - Keith 'Doc' Harris Shield (1) 1997
- Clark Cup: (1) 1997
- Nicholson Cup: (1) 1997

==== Division 4 Championships ====
- McLean Cup: (1) 1996
- Grose Cup: (1) 1996

== Colours and home ground ==
Drummoyne's club colours are red, black and yellow and its home ground is Drummoyne Oval. The club fields junior and senior teams and a women's sevens rugby side.

== International representatives ==
- Alan Cardy
- Ray Colbert
- Greg Davis
- Eric Ford
- Jack Ford
- John Freedman
- Doug Keller
- Arthur McGill
- Ian Moutray
- Steve Williams
