= Stan Wickham =

Australia international rugby union player (1877-1960)

- Born: Stanley Montgomery Wickham; 4 January 1877 Parramatta, New South Wales
- Died: March 1960
- School: Parramatta Marist

Rugby union career
- Position: centre
Senior career
Years	Team	Apps	(Points)
1893-94	Parramatta		
1896-96	Wallaroos		
1900-06	West Harbour	87	
Provincial / State sides
Years	Team	Apps	(Points)
1895–1906	New South Wales	37	
International career
Years	Team	Apps	(Points)
1903-05	Australia	5	(3)

Stan Wickham (4 January 1877 – March 1960) was a pioneer Australian rugby union player, a state and national representative centre who captained the Australian national side on a number of occasions in the early 1900s. He was tour captain for the inaugural Wallaby overseas tour, that to New Zealand in 1905.

== Early life and club rugby ==
Born in Parramatta, New South Wales Wickham was schooled at Parramatta Marist Brothers followed by Sydney Boys High School, graduating in 1889 where he learned his rugby. After school he played for the Parramatta Two Blues in 1893 & 1894 then the Wallaroo club side in Sydney in 1895 and 1896. He lived in Lucknow near Orange, New South Wales from 1896 to 1899 and played rugby there, making representative Country sides for clashes against City in each of those years. In 1900 he returned to Sydney and commenced with the Western Suburbs DRUFC in its inaugural year of competition. He would play 87 first-grade games for the club.

== Representative career ==
Wickham was first selected in a New South Wales representative side in 1895 aged 19 and would go on to make 37 Waratah appearances in a state representative career than lasted till 1906. He made 24 state appearances in matches against Queensland. Howell cites his finest Waratahs game as an 1897 tour match against the visiting All Blacks when he scored two tries and booted a conversion for a rare 22-8 New South Wales win over New Zealand.

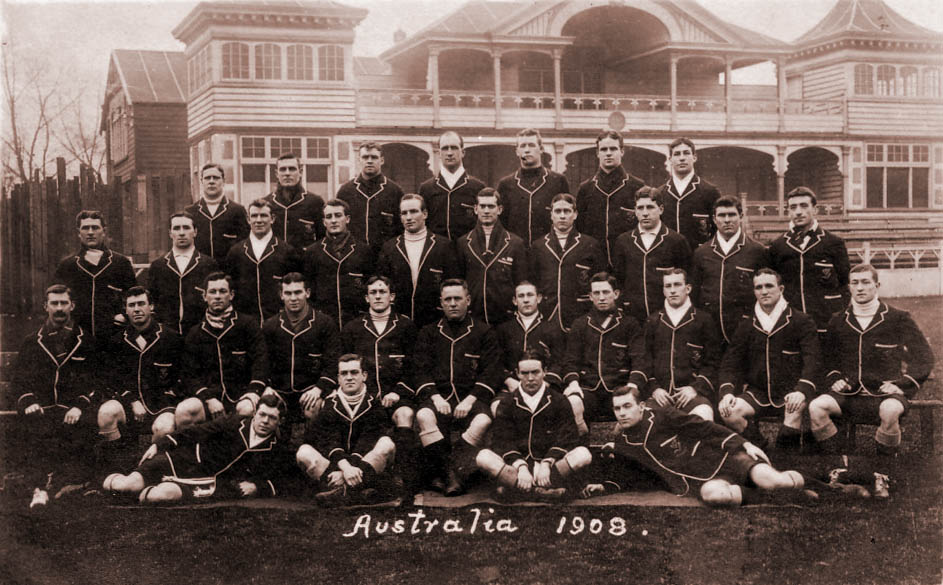
Wickham 2nd row, left with 1908 Wallabies

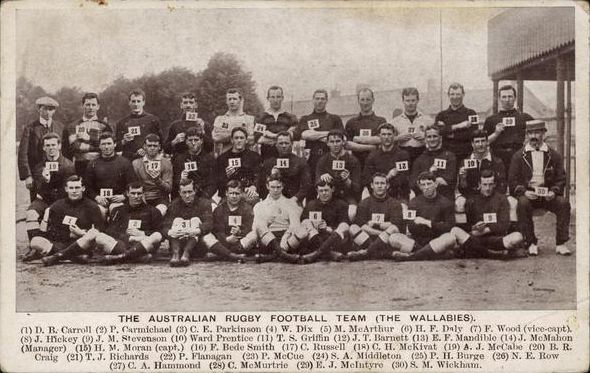
Wickham (#30) with named 1908 Wallabies

He first represented at the national level against New Zealand, in Sydney, on 15 August 1903. He made two Test appearances against Great Britain who toured Australia 1904 and then in 1905 he was selected for the Wallabies tour of New Zealand, the first overseas campaign by an Australian rugby side. He was one of fourteen New South Welshman, who with nine Queenslanders made up a twenty-five strong squad. It was a disappointing tour for the Wallabies who played seven games and won only the last three against Manawatu-Hawkes Bay, Wanganui-Taranaki and Auckland. Wickham played every match on tour and was top-scorer with eighteen points from two penalty goals and three goals from marks. In total he claimed five international rugby caps for Australia, four of them as captain.

== Coach ==
Wickham had been two years retired by the date of the 1908–09 Australia rugby union tour of Britain. New South Wales state selector James McMahon was tour manager and in those days the idea that anyone other than the captain would coach the side was frowned upon. McMahon was initially the only accompanying official but Howell writes that a public campaign resulted in Wickham also being included on the tour as Assistant Manager acting unofficially as coach.

Preceded by Bob McCowan	Australian national rugby union captain 1903-1905	Succeeded by Frank Nicholson

== Bibliography ==
- Collection (1995) Gordon Bray presents The Spirit of Rugby, Harper Collins Publishers Sydney
- Howell, Max (2005) Born to Lead - Wallaby Test Captains, Celebrity Books, Auckland NZ
- Zavos, Spiro (2000) The Golden Wallabies, Penguin, Victoria
