= Eastern Suburbs District RUFC =

Australian rugby union club, based in Sydney, NSW

Eastern Suburbs
- Full name: Eastern Suburbs District Rugby Union Football Club
- Nicknames: Beasts; Beasties
- Founded: 1900; 126 years ago
- Location: Rose Bay, Sydney
- Ground: Woollahra Oval (Capacity: 5,000)
- Coach: Ben Batger
- League(s): Shute Shield, NSWRU
Team kit

Official website
- www.eastsrugby.com.au

The Eastern Suburbs District Rugby Union Football Club, or simply the Eastern Suburbs or Easts, is an Australian rugby union club based in Rose Bay in Sydney's eastern suburbs. The club participates in the Shute Shield, the annual semi-professional rugby union competition in New South Wales. Founded in 1900, Eastern Suburbs is the oldest continuously operating rugby union club in Australia having played in every single season since 1920. Easts have won a total of seventy-seven New South Wales Rugby Union (NSWRU) premiership titles across all grades as well as nine club championships.

== History ==
Eastern Suburbs District Rugby Union Football Club was formed at a meeting at the Paddington Town Hall on 22 March 1900. In an assembly presided over by the mayor and aldermen of Woollahra Council, 200 Eastern Suburbs residents turned out to hear Colonel J. C. Nield put forward a case for the birth of a local rugby club. The sports journalist Jack Davis motioned for the formation of the club and, from that point forth, the Eastern Suburbs District Rugby Union Football club was established. The club's early nickname was "the tricolours" due to their jerseys with horizontal bands in red, white and blue.

Easts Rugby has seen a lot of great players. The first ever try-scorer for Eastern Suburbs in a first grade premiership match was H. D. Thompson, who scored a try on 19 May 1900 playing Glebe at the Sydney Cricket Ground. That same day, Leo Finn made the conversion and became Easts first goal scorer. That year, Easts Rugby was honoured to have test forward A. J. (Tiger) Kelly become its first NSW representative, when he helped lead NSW to victory over QLD 11–9 in Sydney on 21 July 1900. However, it was not until 1903, when J. W. Maund was named in the Australian side, that Easts saw its first Wallaby.

As the years moved on, Easts Rugby saw success on many occasions. The club was helped along by a raft of talent that included Dally Messenger, G. C. (Wakka) Walker, sports star Harald Baker, and Victoria Cross winner Bede Kenny. Easts also had a notable backline when Stanley R. Rowley – Australia's first Olympic sprint medalist – joined the team in the early 1900s. Other noted players included Dr Alex Ross, Englishman Ed Slater, Robert Westfield, Colin J. Sefton, Wallaby Murray Tate, reputed goal-kicker John Cox, World Cup winners Tony Daly and Jason Little, the world's best number eight in his era Tim Gavin, and H. R. (Perc) Newton, who played a record 264 grade games for Easts.

During the First World War (1915–18) the club merged with Newtown to form the Newtown-Eastern Suburbs club for non-competition games and the first post-war premiership season (now Shute Shield) in 1919. The merger was dissolved at the start of 1920 and Easts have subsequently played every season since, making them and Northern Suburbs (formerly North Sydney) the oldest ever-present rugby union clubs in Australia outside of the schools and universities.

In all, Easts Rugby has won a total of seventy-nine premiership title across grade and colts from 1900 to 2013. Along with this, they have won nine club championships.

A women's team was first established in 1994. Team captains were Sarah Roxburgh and Amy Copeland.

== Colours ==
At the 1900 Paddington Town Hall founding meeting, the Eastern Suburbs club adopted the red, white and blue of the 1899 Paddington FC (who played in the final club competition before Sydney's district football clubs era), in the tricolours jersey style of the 1899 British Lions touring team. The red, white and blue tricolours jersey had first been used in Sydney rugby union by Wallaroo FC in 1872. For the 1900 season, while awaiting their new tricolour jerseys to arrive from England, the Eastern Suburbs club wore a black jersey with a shield badge with red, white and blue coloured stripes.

== Honours ==
FIRST DIVISION

- 1st Grade Premiers (Shute Shield since 1923): 1903, 1913, 1921, 1931, 1941, 1944, 1946, 1947, 1969, 2024
- ES Marks Minor Premierships: 1953, 1969, 1970, 2000, 2024

SECOND DIVISION

- 1st Grade Premiers (Colin Lawson Memorial Trophy): 1981, 1984

Recent titles in other grades:

- 2022, 2018, 2009 Colin Caird Shield
- 2022, 2010 Henderson Cup
- 2019 Shell Trophy
- 2022, 2019, 2018, 2013 Bill Simpson Shield

== Season-by-season records (incomplete) ==
Season Results
Year	Play off results	Wins	Ties	Losses	Points
2013	Quarter Finals	9	0	9	missing
2014	Did not make play offs	6	0	12	32
2015	Did not make play offs	4	0	14	27
2016	Did not make play offs	8	0	10	54
2017	Did not make play offs	6	1	11	40
2018	Quarter Finals	11	0	7	60
2019	Quarter Finals	10	0	7	52
2020	Semi-finals	9	0	3	46
2021	3rd in standings†	7	0	3	35
2022	1/8-Finals	8	0	10	49
2023	Did not make play offs	6	0	12	37
2024	In Progress	6	0	3	38

† Season cut short by COVID-19.

== Notable players ==
- Tom Bowman
- Mark Bakewell
- Ryan Cross
- Fabian Goodall
- Tony Daly
- Huia Edmonds
- Ted Fahey
- Tim Gavin
- Andrew Heath
- Matt Hodgson
- Archer Holz
- Jason Little
- Jack Maddocks (Australia)
- Kotaro Matsushima (Japan) (2015)
- Malcolm McArthur
- Keith McLellan
- Brendan McKibbin
- Dally Messenger
- Geoff Richards
- Ed Slater
- Tiaan Strauss
- Fred Thompson
- Matt To'omua (Australia)
- John Welborn
- Dirk Williams
- Arabella McKenzie (Australia)
- Desiree Miller (Australia)
- Lydia Kavoa (Australia)
- Maya Stewart (Australia)
