= GPS Rugby =

Australian rugby union club, based in Brisbane

(Australia) GPS Rugby Club
- Full name: GPS Old Boys Rugby Union Club
- Nickname: The Gallopers or Jeeps
- Founded: 1928; 98 years ago
- Location: Ashgrove
- Region: Queensland
- League: Queensland Premier Rugby
Team kit

Official website
- www.gpsrugby.com.au

GPS Rugby Club, colloquially known as Jeeps, is an Australian rugby union club based at Ashgrove in Brisbane that plays in the Queensland Premier Rugby competition.

The club has produced more than fifty Wallabies, including Ben Tune, Daniel Herbert, and Matt Cockbain, and many other representative and professional players.

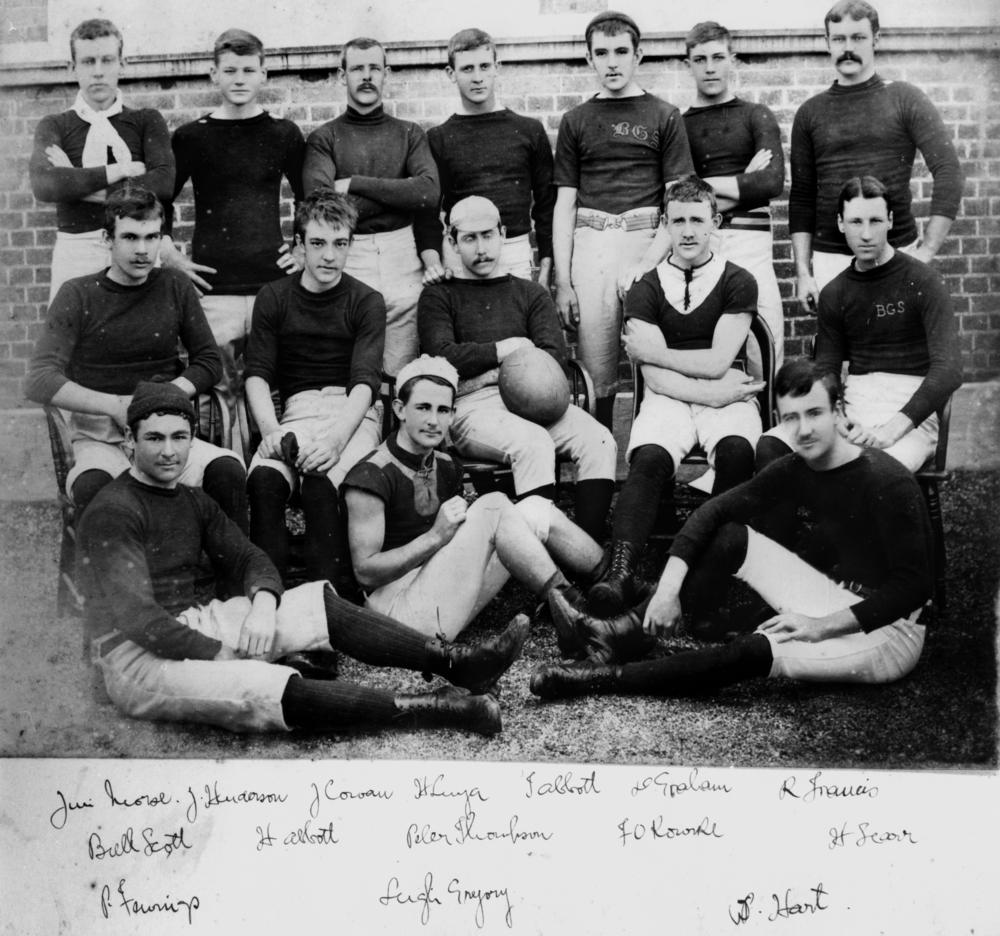
Brisbane Grammar School's first Rugby Union team, 1887.

== Club names ==
"Jeeps" is derived from "GPS Old Boys", which was adopted as the name of the club in the 1930s. The club traces its origins back to 1887, when the "Past & Present Grammar Club" was formed from teachers, students, and past students of the Brisbane Grammar School (BGS).

"Past & Present Grammar" evolved into "Past Grammar", and eventually "BGS Old Boys". The "BGS Old Boys" became "GPS Old Boys" when broadening the membership base in 1931, as players were sought from other Great Public Schools (GPS).

Jeeps has no formal link with the GPS Association, apart from the name, and the club is open to senior and junior players from all schools and backgrounds.

== History ==
GPS Old Boys claims to be one of the oldest rugby clubs in Australia, and traces its heritage back to a Past & Present Grammar club formed in 1887. The Past & Present Grammar Club fielded teams made up of teachers, students, and some past students of the Brisbane Grammar School through to 1890.

At a meeting of the Old Boys on Thursday 5 March 1891, it was decided to form a Club composed of past members of the Brisbane Grammar School. (ref: Brisbane Courier Saturday 7 March 1891). This Past Grammar Club was a separate entity from the Past & Present Grammar Club.

The Past Grammar Club played in the Senior Grade competition in Brisbane from 1891 through to 1900, until the introduction of the Electorate Football System in 1901. The club returned with the reintroduction of the Club Football System in 1905, and played through to 1914.

After WWI, Past Grammar rejoined Brothers, Valleys & University and played in the 1919 QRU competition, but moved over to Rugby League in 1920 when the Rugby Union was disbanded in the 1920s. The Past Grammar Club that moved to Rugby League would later become Northern Suburbs Districts and finally Norths Devils in the Brisbane Rugby League.

A new incarnation called BGS Old Boys Football Club was formed in 1928, when a small faction of members from the original Past Grammar left the club to play in the reinstated rugby union competition. (Ref: Norths Devils website)

BGS Old Boys played a number of exhibition games against the newly formed YMCA Club. However this new Club was quite separate to the original Past Grammar Club which was still playing in the Brisbane Rugby League Competition. These 2 Clubs would form the heart of the 5 Club 1929 QRU Senior Rugby Competition which also included Valleys, Wynnum District and Past Commercials.

According to noted rugby historian Ian Diehm in his book Red! Red! Red!, Past Grammar reformed along with other clubs after the devastation of the first world war, and eventually became GPS Old Boys in 1931 after a change of constitution, which broadened its membership beyond old boys of Brisbane Grammar. The first president of GPS Old Boys was Dr Kenneth Fraser and its first coach Dr "Jacky" Beath, the former Wallaby and Australian Infantry Forces fullback.

Four members of the club - "Blow" Ide, Bill McLean, Boyd Oxlade and Llewellyn "Welly" Lewis went to England with the 1939 Wallabies, but only McLean continued after World War II. McLean was the first of GPS's two Australian captains, Arch Winning being the second.

The club has had many homes: New Farm Park, Finsbury Park and, since 1977, Ashgrove Sports Ground.

Past Grammar had won premierships in 1892, 1898, 1899 and 1914. GPS won the 1942 and 1943 "A" Grade Premierships (Keith Horsley Memorial Trophy) against Eagle Junction and University respectively, but had to wait until 1961 to win the Hospital Challenge Cup, coached by the former GPS player and later Queensland and Australian coach, the late Bob Templeton.

The club won the premiership again in 1972 and for a fifth time in 1996, when the A Grade team upset Souths 12-6. After a 22-year drought, GPS won the premiership for a sixth time in 2018.

HISTORICAL CHRONOLOGY

School Team (BRISBANE GRAMMAR SCHOOL)

- Brisbane Grammar School - 1887: Northern Rugby Union (NRU) Senior Grade
- Past & Present Grammar - 1888-1890:(NRU) Senior Grade

Old Boys Team (PAST GRAMMAR)

- Past Grammar - 1891-1900:(NRU/QRU) Senior Grade
- Past Grammar - 1905-1914: Queensland Rugby Union(QRU) Senior Grade
- Past Grammar - 1919:(QRU) Senior Grade
- Past Grammar - 1920-1921: Queensland Rugby League (Metropolitan) Senior Grade
- Past Grammar - 1922-1932: Brisbane Rugby League Senior Grade renamed Northern Suburbs Districts Rugby League Club in 1933 (Ref: "Passing of Past Grammars, Brisbane Courier Friday 24 February 1933)

Old Boys Team (GPS OLD BOYS)

- BGS Old Boys - 1928-1930 (QRU) "A" Grade
- GPS Old Boys - 1931-Present (QRU) "A" Grade

== Premiership finals results ==
=== Past Grammar ===
Premiers (5)

- 1892 - Past Grammar 15 def Athenians (Ipswich) 5
- 1898 - Past Grammar 11 def City 3
- 1899 - Past Grammar 26 def City 0
- 1914 - Past Grammar 11 def Brothers 8
- 1927* - Past Grammar 13 def Western Suburbs 11

Runners-Up (9)

- 1891 - Arfomas 8 def Past Grammar 5
- 1893 - Boomerangs 10 def Past Grammar 0
- 1894 - Boomerangs 6 def Past Grammar 0
- 1896 - City 6 def Past Grammar 5
- 1900 - City 16 def Past Grammar 3
- 1905 - North Brisbane 8 def Past Grammar 0
- 1913 - Brothers 12 def Past Grammar 0
- 1931* - Fortitude Valley 27 def Past Grammar 9
- 1932* - Western Suburbs 8 def Past Grammar 7

=== GPS Old Boys ===
Premiers (6)

- 1942 - GPS 11 def Eagle Junction 9
- 1943 - GPS 10 def University 8
- 1961 - GPS 19 def University 13
- 1972 - GPS 23 def University 18
- 1996 - GPS 12 def Souths 6
- 2018 - GPS 23 def University 16

Runners-Up (19)

- 1931 - University 16 def GPS 15
- 1934 - University 20 def GPS 18
- 1940 - Eagle Junction 6 def GPS 3
- 1944 - YMCA 8 def GPS 3
- 1946 - Brothers 11 def GPS 6
- 1948 - University 21 def GPS 18
- 1951 - Brothers 17 def GPS 6
- 1954 - University 19 def GPS 3
- 1956 - University 19 def GPS 6
- 1965 - University 17 def GPS 15
- 1967 - University 17 def GPS 15
- 1970 - University 24 def GPS 6
- 1973 - Brothers 20 def GPS 10
- 1974 - Brothers 27 def GPS 19
- 1975 - Brothers 23 def GPS 9
- 1976 - Teachers-Norths 16 def GPS 4
- 2013 - Easts 27 def GPS 22
- 2017 - University 23 def GPS 14
- 2021 - University 29 def GPS 12

Notes
* Past Grammar played in the Brisbane Rugby League premiership from 1920-1932. The rugby union competition was disbanded from 1920-27. In 1928, a group of players from Past Grammar formed the BGS Old Boys club to play in the reinstated rugby union competition. BGS Old Boys was renamed GPS Old Boys in 1931. In 1933, the Past Grammar club was absorbed into the newly created Northern Suburbs Districts Rugby League Club when the Brisbane Rugby League implemented a "District Scheme".

== National Club Champions ==
The Australian Club Championship is a challenge match between the Brisbane and Sydney club premiers. GPS have played in the fixture twice, winning it in 2019.

== Internationals ==
- A. C. Corfe
- C. S. Graham
- R. H. Mc Cowan
- A. H. Henry
- S. B. Boland
- H. H. Bullmore
- A. M. Oxlade
- C. E Parkinson
- F. R. V. Timbury
- L. G. Brown
- A. W. Kent
- T. Lawton Sr.
- J. B. T. Donely
- G. S. Sturtridge
- E. S. Hayes
- W. D. Douglas
- B. D. Oxlade
- L. S. Lewis
- W. P. J. Ide
- W. M. McLean
- J. R. McLean
- E. G. Broad DFC
- A. Ware
- D. I. MacMillan
- P. D. Thompson
- K. C. Winning
- C. J. Primmer
- R. Colbert
- G. G. Jones
- J. N. Greene
- G. R. Horsley
- I. P. Colquhoun
- B. A. Wright
- A. F. McBoyd
- D. W. Lowth
- O. F. Edwards
- P. D. Perrin
- D. J. A. Clark
- D. A. Taylor
- D. S. Rathie
- C. M. Carberry
- D. W. Hillhouse
- G. G. Shambrook
- A. J. McIntyre
- D. Codey
- T. Coker
- I. Tabua
- A. G. Herbert
- D. J. Herbert
- R. Constable
- B. N. Tune
- M. J. Cockbain
- B. J. Cockbain
- T. P. Atkinson
- D. P. Heenan
- T. McVerry
- P. Hynes
- R. Samo
- A. Fainga'a
- S. Fainga'a
- B. Toolis for Scotland
- M. Ngauamo for Tonga

== See also ==
- Queensland Premier Rugby
- Rugby union in Queensland
