= 1908–09 Australia rugby union tour of Britain =

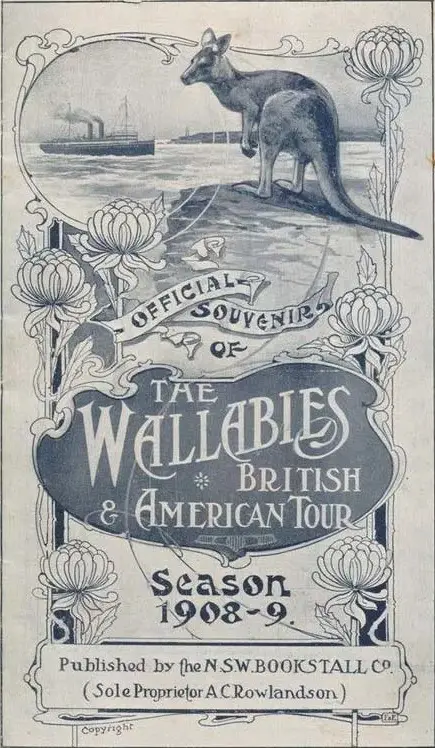
- 1908 poster of the Wallabies tour
Summary
P	W	D	L
Total
39	33	1	5
Test match
2	1	0	1
Opponent
P	W	D	L
Wales
1	0	0	1
England
1	1	0	0

The 1908–09 Australia rugby union tour of the British Isles was a collection of friendly rugby union games undertaken by the Australia national rugby union team against invitational and national teams from England and Wales, as well as several games against sides from North America. This was the first Australian tour of the Northern Hemisphere and the side is sometimes referred to as the "First Wallabies".

Both the New Zealand and South African teams had toured Europe in 1905 and 1906 respectively, both achieving unexpected but deserved success against club and international opposition. Despite the success of these two touring teams, Australia suffered poor press and with only a single win after the teams' first twelve international matches in its history to that point, few people suggested the team would do well. Against low expectations the Australians played well, winning 25 of 31 matches played on the tour and with some commentators writing that the team would have achieved better results if they had not picked up so many injuries.

Australia took in two recognised international games, against Wales and England, but failed to play any games in Scotland or Ireland due to the Irish and Scottish Unions resenting the International Rugby Board's attitude regarding the Australian invitation.

== The squad's leadership ==
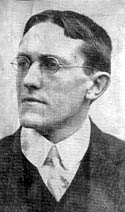
Herbert Moran, team captain

Tour manager, who performed the role of coach was New South Wales state selector James McMahon, a veteran of the early NSWRU representative fixtures of 1889 and 1894 against New Zealand. He was assisted by Stan Wickham who had captained the Wallabies on 10 occasions between 1904 and 1905. Tour captain was Herbert Moran. The team was also captained in matches during the tour by Chris McKivat and by Fred Wood, the tour vice-captain. They played in blue shirts, emblazoned with the Waratah. Players were paid 3 shillings a day in expenses.

At a pre-tour function in Sydney it was announced the Australian team would be called "the Rabbits", which British newspapers soon picked up on. The side played two matches on the way to England, but after arrival decided to hold a team meeting to choose an alternative name, with the "Wallabies" ultimately voted upon to replace "Rabbits". From the 1930s onwards "Wallabies" was used to describe the Australia national rugby union team when touring to Britain. These days the national side are the Wallabies whether playing at home or anywhere abroad.

The Wallabies in 1908 also had a war-cry which the NSWRU in Australia had suggested the team should use (following the style of the 1905 All Blacks and 1906 Springboks tours) for its "box-office value". The team's captain Moran wrote:

The memory of that war cry provokes anger in me even after all these years ... We were expected to leap up in the air and make foolish gestures which somebody thought Australian natives might have used in similar circumstances and we were give meaningless words which we were to utter savagely during the pantomime ... I refused to lead the wretched caricature of a native corroboree and regularly hid myself among the team, a conscientious objector.

— Herbert Moran, Viewless Winds

Echoing the feelings of the Australian team towards the war-cry, there was little respect shown from their opponents towards it either. In the encounter with Cardiff at the Cardiff Arms Park, Percy Bush responded to the cry by charging onto the pitch brandishing a sword and shield, in what was intended to be an amusing riposte.

== Tour itinerary ==
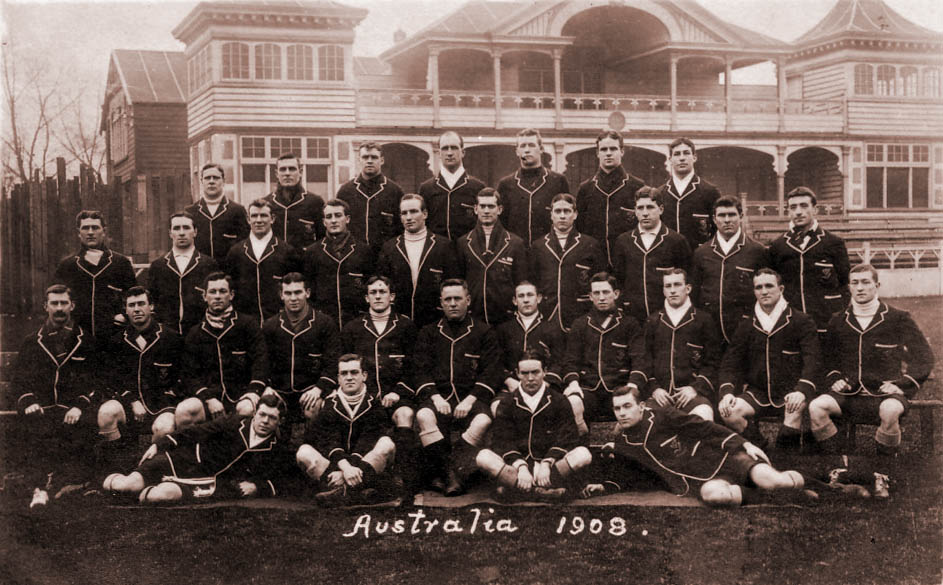
The 1908 squad to tour England

The squad left Sydney on 8 August 1908 on board the SS Omrah bound for Melbourne. The ship contained 116 passengers, 1579 bales of wool, 2729 carcasses of mutton, 4650 carcasses of lamb, 2000 quarters of beef, 4800 crates of frozen rabbits and 200 tonnes of lead and copper. They played a game at the MCG against a Victorian XV which was won 26–6. They docked in Fremantle and played and won a fixture against a Western Australian XV 58–6.

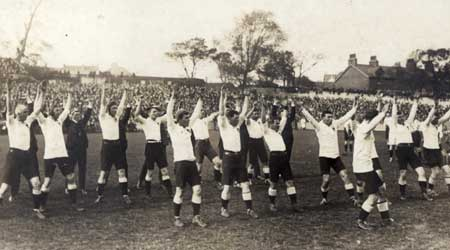
Wallabies pre-match war-cry

On the long voyage Moran introduced the practice of team meetings that were part lecture and part brain–storming with players encouraged to voice their ideas on improving team performance. Moran stood at a blackboard and while his lecturing style was initially derided by the players he managed to instill a sense of cleverness and skill in players, creating thoughts of rugby as similar to a game of chess. The Sydney forward Cecil Murnin became ill on the voyage and left the tour in Naples to return to Australia.

The first tour match in England was against Devon. Peter Burge broke a leg in that match and did not play again on the tour. Australia won the match with 14 men. Bob Craig had brought a carpet snake in his luggage as a tour mascot and the snake died that same day. The fourth tour match saw the Wallabies pitted against the best players from Cardiff and Swansea playing as Glamorgan County. The match at Pontypridd drew a crowd of 20,000 who gave the visitors a standing ovation. In that match another player was lost to a broken leg – this time from the sideline. The Queensland forward Flanagan was running the flag as line–umpire and collided with the winger "Boxer" Russell. Australia's first loss was the ninth match, against Llanelli RFC – a spirited encounter which saw the Llanelli side win the match 8–3 and themselves a place in local sporting folklore.

== Olympic Wallabies ==
During the tour, the Olympic Games were being held in London. The Australian team entered the rugby tournament and were the only other team alongside Cornwall, who were representing Great Britain. The interest in the Olympic rugby final was only lukewarm with the final being held in the last week of Games that had taken place over six months.

Australia had already beaten Cornwall, the British county champions early in the tour. Scottish and Irish Unions had turned down the RFU's invitation to participate in the Olympic bouts. France were expected to contest the medal, but had withdrawn, leaving just Australia and Cornwall for England team to play for gold and silver medals.

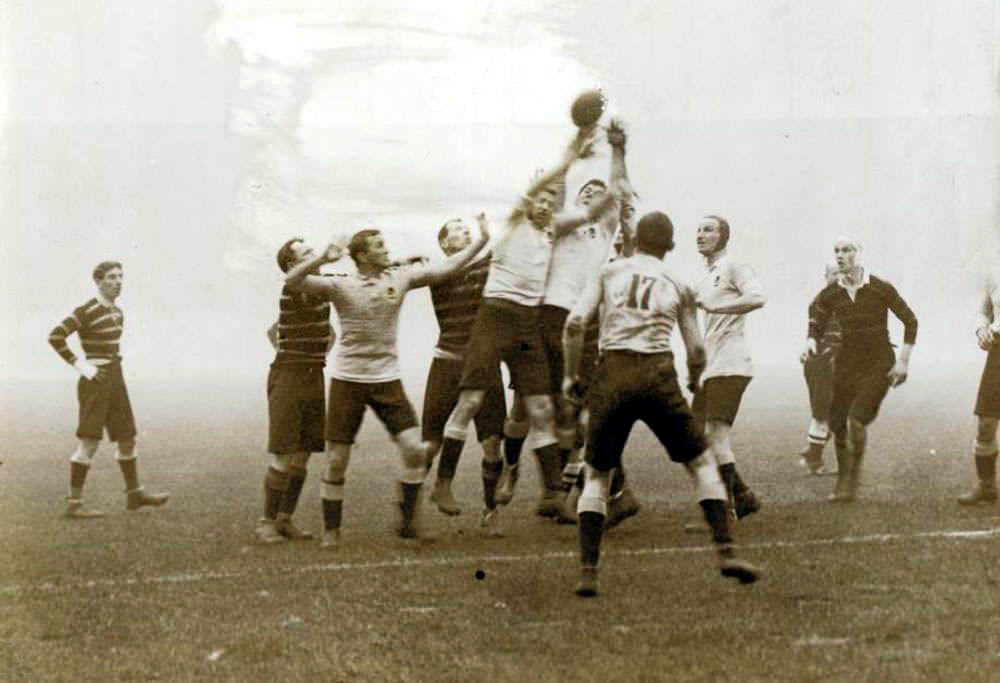
1908 Olympic Gold Final: Australasia 32 – Cornwall RFU (Great Britain) 3

The match was played on an area alongside the Olympic Games swimming pool which measured 110 yards in length with a long line of netting stretched beside to catch flying balls. Large mattresses were spread along the rim of the pool to prevent injuries to falling players. One day was allocated to what was called the Olympic rugby tournament. Neither Moran, nor the tour vice-captain Fred Wood played so Chris McKivat led the Wallabies to an easy 32–3 victory and to Olympic glory, with each Wallaby in that match thereafter an Olympic gold medallist.

It will be remembered that less than a month ago there was a match played between Australia and Cornwall at Camborne and although the Australians also won on that occasion, the beaten side then played on the whole, a very good game. Yesterday the champion England county was practically at full strength, but from start to finish they were outplayed. The methods by which this victory was gained were even more creditable to the winners than the completeness of the victory itself and it is only fair to the Australians to speak of their play in terms of unqualified praise. The ground was very slippery and very heavy and as a result of several hours of continuous rain the ball was very greasy. The continued excellence of the play of the Australian backs therefore surprised the spectators. They gave a display of football which would have done credit to a Welsh international side, at its best. They scored eight tries and so good was the play leading up to each of them that it would be hard to say which was the best.

— Major Trevor in The Daily Telegraph, 27 October 1908

== Tour statistics ==
The tour took in 31 games in the British Isles, with the Australians winning 25, losing five and drawing one. Of the test matches, the team lost against Wales, but beat England. These matches were the first ever encounters between an Australian team and their hosts. A further two matches were played in Australia en route and there were five matches in the US and Canada.

The Wallabies scored 438 points on tour to 149 against, scoring 104 tries in the process and averaging better than three tries per game with 80 scored by the backs and 24 by the forwards.

== Touring party ==
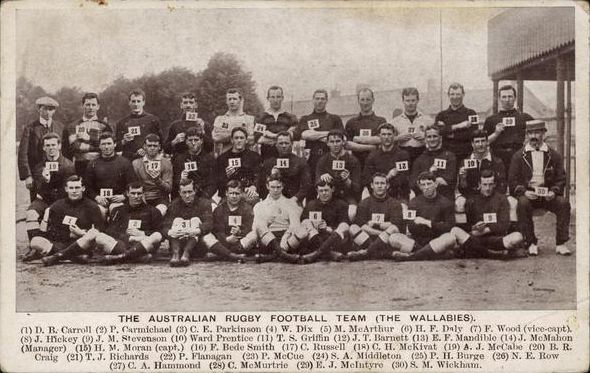
The 1908 Australian team with names

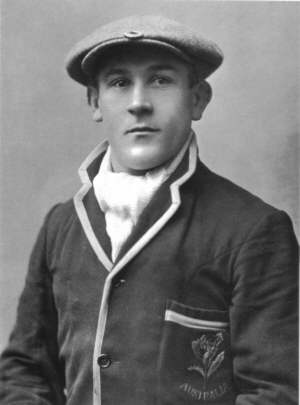
Fred Wood

Ken Gavin

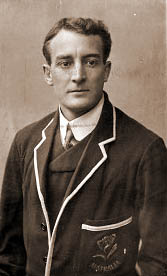
Tom Richards

=== Management ===
- Manager: James McMahon
- Assistant: Stan Wickham
- Captain: Herbert Moran
- Vice-Captain: Fred Wood

=== Full backs ===
- Phil Carmichael (Brothers)
- William Dix (Armidale)

=== Three-quarters ===
- Charles Russell (Newtown)
- Daniel Carroll (St. George)
- Jack Hickey (Glebe)
- Frank Smith (Central West)
- Herbert Daly (Central West)
- Edward Mandible (Sydney)
- Esmond Parkinson (Harlin)

=== Half backs ===
- Christopher McKivatt (Glebe)
- Arthur McCabe (South Sydney)
- Fred Wood (Glebe)
- Ward Prentice (West Suburbs)
- Joseph Stevenson (Northern)

=== Forwards ===
- Thomas Griffen (Glebe)
- Jumbo Barnett (Newtown)
- Patrick McCue (Newtown)
- Sydney Middleton (Glebe)
- Tom Richards (Charters Towers)
- Malcolm McArthur (Eastern Suburbs)
- Charles McMurtrie (Orange)
- Bob Craig (Balmain)
- Herbert Moran (Newcastle)
- Ted McIntyre (Central West)
- Ken Gavin (Central West)
- Albert Burge (South Sydney)
- Peter Burge (South Sydney)
- Cecil Murnin (Eastern Suburbs)
- Norm Row (Eastern Suburbs)
- Peter Flanagan (Brothers)
- Charles Hammand (University)

== Match summary ==
Complete list of matches played by Australia at British Isles and North America:

Test matches

#	Date	Rival	City	Venue	Score
1	10 August 1908	Victoria	Melbourne	Cricket Ground	26–6
2	17 Aug	Western Australia	Fremantle	Fremantle Oval	58–6
3	6 Sep	Devon RU	Devonport	Rectory Ground	24–3
4	1 Oct	Gloucestershire RU	Gloucester	Kingsholm Stadium	16–0
5	3 Oct	Cornwall RU	Camborne		18–5
6	7 Oct	Glamorgan	Pontypridd	Taff Vale Park	16–3
7	10 Oct	Penygraig RFC	Tonypandy	Athletic Ground	11–3
8	15 Oct	Neath/Aberavon Combined	Neath	Neath Football Ground	15–0
9	17 Oct	Llanelli RFC	Llanelli	Stradey Park	3–8
10	19 Oct	Monmouthshire	Pontypool	Football Ground	– (Note: Cancelled due to pitch waterlogged.)
11	24 Oct	London	Richmond		3–0
12	26 Oct	Cornwall	London	White City Stadium	32–3
13	28 Oct	Army/Navy RU Combined	Portsmouth	Recreation Ground	8–6
14	31 Oct	Durham	Hartlepool	Friarage Ground	29–7
15	4 Nov	Northumberland/Cumberland RU	Newcastle upon Tyne	St James' Park	18–6
16	7 Nov	Cheshire	Birkenhead	Birkenhead Park	37–3
17	11 Nov	London	Blackheath	Rectory Field	24–3
18	14 Nov	Cambridge University	Cambridge		11–9
19	18 Nov	Oxford University	Oxford	Iffley Road	19–3
20	21 Nov	Yorkshire RU	Wakefield	Belle Vue	24–0
21	25 Nov	Lancashire RU	Fallowfield	Fallowfield Stadium	12–6
22	28 Nov	Somerset	Taunton	Athletic Grounds	8–0
23	2 Dec	Midlands Combined			5–16
24	5 Dec	Anglo-Wales XV (Note: Combined team of English and Welsh players.)	Richmond		24–0
25	12 Dec	Wales	Cardiff	Cardiff Arms Park	6–9
26	17 Dec	Glamorgan League	Pontypridd	Taff Vale Park	9–5
27	19 Dec	Newport RFC	Newport	Rodney Parade	5–3
28	22 Dec	Abertillery RFC	Abertillery		3–3
29	24 Dec	North Glamorgan	Merthyr	Penydarren Park	13–5
30	26 Dec	Swansea RFC	Swansea	St. Helen's Ground	0–6
31	28 Dec	Cardiff RFC	Cardiff	Cardiff Arms Park	8–24
32	2 January 1909	France	Colombes		– (Note: Cancelled due to weather conditions.)
33	9 Jan	England	Blackheath	Rectory Field	9–3
34	13 Jan	Bristol / Clifton Combined		Gloucestershire Ground	11–3
35	16 Jan	Plymouth	Plymouth		15–6
36	6 Feb	University of California	Berkeley, California	California Field	27–0
37		Stanford University	Stanford, California	Stanford Field	13–3
38	13 Feb	All-California Combined	California		17–0
39		Vancouver	Vancouver		23–0
40		Victoria	Victoria, BC		26–3

== Test matches ==
=== Wales ===
12 December 1908

Wales	9–6	Australia
Try: Phil Hopkins; Travers; Con: Winfield		Try: Richards; Russell

Cardiff Arms Park, Cardiff
Attendance: 30,000
Referee: G Evans (England)

Team details

Wales	Australia

Wales: Bert Winfield, Johnnie Williams, Jack Jones, Billy Trew (captain), Phil Hopkins, Dick Jones, Dicky Owen, James Watts, George Travers, George Hayward, Jim Webb, Phil Waller, Tom Evans, Ivor Morgan, David John Thomas
Australia: Phil Carmichael, Charles Russell, John Hickey, Edward Mandible, Daniel Carroll, Ward Prentice, Christopher McKivatt, Thomas Griffen, Bob Craig, Jumbo Barnett, Peter Burge, Charles Hammand, Patrick McCue, Tom Richards, Herbert Moran (captain)

After the tours by the New Zealand and South African teams, the Welsh crowds were beginning to become fatigued at greeting another 'colonial' team, and the crowd of 30,000 at the Cardiff Arms Park was smaller than previous in tours. Those that attended were repaid with an exciting and close encounter, with two tries from both sides and Wales winning by just a single penalty goal. The contest between the forwards was described as 'tremendous', and at the end of the match Moran was chaired from the ground by the Welsh supporters. Moran was later quoted as saying: "It was a very gruelling game; in fact, I think it was one of the hardest games I had ever played in."

Moran describes the last fifteen minutes as tremendously hard. Twice or three times the Australian backs either crossed the line or knocked down a corner post without being able to score. In the dying moments one of the Australian wingers made a break with just Bert Winfield to beat. Instead of stepping or fending him the Wallaby three-quarter attempted to barge through and both players collapsed to the ground. The whistle blew and the test was Wales'.

=== England ===
9 January 1909

England	3–9	Australia
Try: Mobbs		Try: Row; Russell (2)

Rectory Field, Blackheath
Attendance: 18,000
Referee: J Games (Wales)

Team details

England	Australia

England: George Lyon (captain), Edgar Mobbs, Frank Tarr, Eric Assinder, Barrie Bennetts, Alec Ashcroft, Rupert Williamson, JG Cooper, Robert Dibble, Alf Kewney, Sid Penny, Alfred Warrington-Morris, Fred Knight, Percy Down, William Oldham
Australia: Phil Carmichael, Charles Russell, John Hickey, Ward Prentice, William Dix, Arthur McCabe, Christopher McKivatt (captain), Ken Gavin, Norm Row, Jumbo Barnett, Patrick McCue, Charles Hammand, Malcolm McArthur, Tom Richards, Sydney Middleton

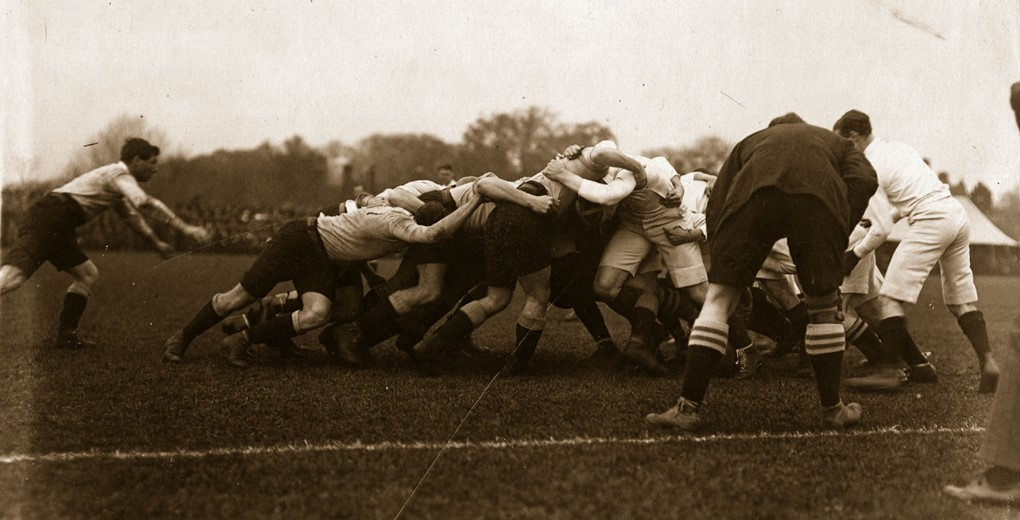
A scrum during the test v. England at the Rectory Field

The match was to have been played at Twickenham but bad weather had delayed the construction of the stand and it was moved to Blackheath.

England had ten new caps, including all four three-quarters. England started well and Edgar Mobbs scored. Wallaby Norman Row kicked an up-and-under, followed up and scored to level the scores. Half-time came at 3-all. Australia dominated the second half. Boxer Russell scored the Wallabies' second and third tries.

Although the Australian team won by three tries to one, sections of the British press reported that the tourists were fortunate to win. This was typical of the press, which had unfairly compared the Australians to the All Black and Springbok teams throughout the tour. Moran had suffered an Achilles-tendon injury in a prior match and missed the England encounter, so the captaincy was given to McKivat.
