= Paul McLean (rugby union) =

Australia international rugby union player

- Born: Paul Edward McLean; 12 October 1953 (age 73) Ipswich, Queensland, Australia
- School: Nudgee College; St Edmund's College
- Notable relative(s): Doug Sr. (grandfather); Bill, Jack, Doug Jr. (uncles); Jeff (brother), Peter (cousin)

Rugby union career
- Position(s): Fly-half, Fullback, Centre
Senior career
Years	Team	Apps	(Points)
1972–1982	Brothers Old Boys		
Provincial / State sides
Years	Team	Apps	(Points)
1973–1982	Queensland	100	(1000)
International career
Years	Team	Apps	(Points)
1974–1982	Australia	31	(263)

Paul Edward McLean, MBE (born 12 October 1953) is an Australian former rugby union player. He played rugby for Queensland and Australia in the 1970s and 1980s, He is a former president of the Queensland Rugby Union, Australian Rugby Union, and an inductee into the Australian Rugby Union Hall of Fame. From 2009 to 2015 he was chief executive officer for Savills (Australia & New Zealand), overseeing the Australasian operations of the multinational real estate services provider.

== Family and early life ==
Paul McLean born in Ipswich, Queensland to Bob and Irene McLean. He attended St Edmund's College in Ipswich and Nudgee College in Brisbane. McLean played for the Ipswich Rangers, before joining Brothers in Brisbane, which was his local rugby club for the rest of his playing career.

Seven members of the McLean family have represented Australia in rugby union or rugby league. His grandfather Doug McLean Sr. and uncle Doug McLean Jr. were dual code internationals who played for the Wallabies and Kangaroos. His uncle Bill captained the Wallabies in the wake of World War II and his uncle Jack toured with the Wallabies in 1946. His brother Jeff and cousin Peter also played for the Wallabies.

== Rugby career ==
McLean made his debut for the Queensland rugby team in 1973, and quickly progressed to make his Wallaby debut the following year against the All Blacks. He made 31 career test appearances between 1974 and 1982.

He was a world-class goal kicker and at his prime there was no better tactical kicker in the game. He was also a gifted runner and passer when he took those options although later in his career critics were regularly calling for Mark Ella's more obvious running game to be brought into the Wallaby side. McLean played mostly at fly-half for the Wallabies but on some occasions was shifted to fullback or centre to make way for fly-half rivals Tony Melrose, Ken Wright and Mark Ella.

McLean captained Australia on one occasion, leading the team to a 22–9 win against Fiji in Suva in 1980. In his 1982 farewell season, McLean reached 1,000 points for Queensland in his 100th and final game. He also scored 21 points against Scotland in his final Test match, which was the Australian individual record at that time.

Brisbane newspaper journalist Hugh Lunn recorded the following on McLean's career in The Australian:

"Paul McLean played 31 Test matches for Australia and 100 for Queensland; he won the rugby premiership for his school (St Joseph's, Nudgee) with a 55m penalty kick; Brothers club lost only one of the eight grand finals in which he played; he scored exactly 1000 points for Queensland in his 100th match in the last match of Queensland Rugby's Centenary year; he kicked 14 consecutive goals against Wales on their Australian tour; he holds the individual Australian point-scoring record for a Test match of 21 points and he is the greatest point scorer in the history of Australian Rugby Union."

On the day of McLean's final game for Queensland, the main grandstand at Ballymore was named the McLean Stand in honour of the contributions from the McLean family to Queensland rugby and Australian rugby.

== Post-rugby ==
After retiring from playing rugby, McLean took up a position as sales manager in the Brisbane office of Ansett in 1982 was promoted to state manager within a year. He later moved into commercial real estate with FPD Savills as Director of Agency & Commercial Leasing.

For six years from late 1999 to 2005, McLean was president of the Queensland Rugby Union. From 2005 to 2009 he was president of the Australian Rugby Union, later renamed Rugby Australia. McLean was inducted into the Australian Rugby Union Hall of Fame in 2011. He became chairman of Rugby Australia as an interim appointment to replace Cameron Clyne in February 2020 ahead of an annual general meeting the following month, and was replaced in May 2020 by Hamish McLennan.

He is also a Director of Youngcare, a charitable organisation that works to create choice in care and housing options for young Australians with high care needs.

== Bibliography ==
- McGregor, Malcolm (1985). Paul McLean. University of Queensland Press. ISBN 0-7022-1885-5.

Preceded by Mark Loane	Australian national rugby union captain 1980	Succeeded by Mark Ella
