= Bill McLean =

Australia international rugby union player

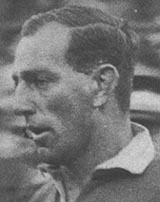
- Born: William Malcolm McLean; 28 February 1918 Ipswich, Queensland
- Died: 9 December 1996 (aged 78)
- School: Brisbane State High School
- Notable relative(s): Jeff, Peter & Paul McLean

Rugby union career
- Position: Flanker
Senior career
Years	Team	Apps	(Points)
1938–1951	GPS Rugby		
Provincial / State sides
Years	Team	Apps	(Points)
1939–1952	Queensland		
International career
Years	Team	Apps	(Points)
1946–1947	Australia	5	
Coaching career
- Years: Team
- 1951–1952: Queensland
- 1951–1952: Australia

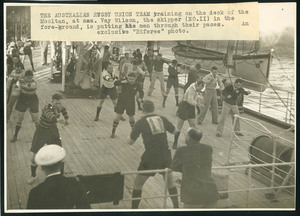
1939 Wallabies training on deck en route to England

William Malcolm McLean (28 February 1918 – 9 December 1996) was an Australian soldier and a state and national representative rugby union player who captained the Wallabies in five Test matches immediately after World War II.

== Early life ==
McLean was born in 1918 in Ipswich, Queensland. He attended Brisbane State High School.

== Pre-war rugby ==
Like their father, Doug McLean Sr., Bill's older brother Doug Jr. had represented for Australia in both rugby codes before Bill left school. Bill too was a promising sportsman – goalkeeper in the 1938 Queensland Water Polo Team and rowing in Surf Boat crews winning the Queensland state championship in 1938. He pursued a rugby career and in 1938 played with the GPS club in Brisbane, and made his representative debut with state selection the following year. From there he was selected for the ill-fated 1939 Wallaby tour to England captained by Vay Wilson. The team docked at Southampton on the day when England declared war and after a couple of weeks spent filling sandbags to start the war effort, the squad set sail for Australia having not played a game. Of the unlucky tourists only McLean, Keith Windon and Len Smith would return to footballing success after the war.

== Military service ==
McLean enlisted in the AIF in July 1940. He was a Captain in the 2/3rd Australian Commando Squadron, and saw action against the Japanese in Borneo after parachuting in behind enemy lines. He was discharged in February 1946.

== Post-war rugby ==
After the war McLean was selected in and captained an Australia XV versus The Rest trial match. His opposing captain was his tour teammate Keith Windon and when The Rest won the game, McLean was picked as tour captain for the first post-war Wallaby tour of New Zealand. Injured in the trial McLean missed the first six tour matches but played and captained the Wallabies in the two Tests against the All Blacks and the Test against the New Zealand Maori. The following year he again met the All Blacks when they visited Australia. He captained once against them and played in both Tests, the second as captain.

In 1947, McLean and Phil Hardcastle were candidates for the national captaincy. After McLean led The Rest to a victory over an Australian XV, he was appointed captain, becoming the seventh Queenslander to lead the national team. The subsequent nine-month international tour included several veterans of World War II. For McLean, the tour included matches in the British Isles and an appearance at Twickenham, where his father and brother had also played.

The tour was only six matches old when McLean fulfilled his dream of playing at Twickenham in a minor clash against Combined Services. The match was near completion when he was hit by three tacklers from different angles. Writers Howell, Tressider and Shehadie (all present on the tour) each described the snap of bone breaking being audible to onlookers. McLean suffered a serious spiral fracture of the tibia and fibula. He played no further games on the tour and had now played his last representative match for Australia. The tour captaincy passed at that moment to the 21-year-old vice-captain Trevor Allan. McLean played for Queensland again in 1951 and 1952, also coaching both the Queensland and the Australian national side in those years.

== Rugby lineage ==
In addition to his father and brother's status as Dual-code rugby internationals, his brother Jack McLean was a Wallaby of 1946, as were later Bill's son Peter McLean and Bill's nephews Jeff and Paul McLean. Paul McLean would later be the Chairman of the Australian Rugby Union for a number of years up till 2008. See McLean Family (rugby footballers).

Preceded by Vay Wilson	Australian national rugby union captain 1946-47	Succeeded by Phil Hardcastle

== Sources ==
- The Spirit of Rugby (1995) (Collection of Essays) HarperCollins, Australia – (Essay specific to this article Phil Tressider's The Class of '47–48 1st published Sydney's Daily Telegraph 1987)
- Howell, Max (2005) Born to Lead – Wallaby Test Captains, Celebrity Books, Auckland NZ
- Shehadie, Nicholas (2003) A Life Worth Living, Simon & Schuster Australia
