= Alec Ashcroft =

English rugby union player (1887–1963)

Alec Ashcroft DSO
- Full name: Alec Hutchinson Ashcroft
- Born: 18 October 1887 West Derby, Liverpool, Lancashire, England
- Died: 18 April 1963 (aged 75) Bath, Somerset, England
- School: Birkenhead School
- University: Gonville & Caius College
- Occupation: Schoolmaster

Rugby union career
- Position: Half-back
International career
Years	Team	Apps	(Points)
1909	England	1	(0)

Alec Hutchinson Ashcroft (18 October 1887 – 18 April 1963) was an English international rugby union player.

== Biography ==
Ashcroft was born in West Derby, Liverpool, and attended Birkenhead School. He went to Gonville and Caius College, Cambridge, on a classical scholarship and was awarded blues for rugby.

A versatile back, Ashcroft made his solitary England appearance partnering Rupert Williamson at half-back, as one of ten new caps introduced against the touring 1908–09 Wallabies in Blackheath. He also played for Blackheath FC, Birkenhead Park FC, Cheshire and Edinburgh Wanderers over the course of his career.

Ashcroft served with the 7th Battalion, South Staffordshire Regiment during World War I. He was mentioned in dispatches three times and as a temporary major in 1919 received the Distinguished Service Order.

Having been an assistant master before the war, Ashcroft took over as headmaster of Fettes College in 1919 and remained in the role until being succeeded by Donald Crichton-Miller in 1945. One of his two sons, David, became headmaster of Cheltenham College.

== See also ==
- List of England national rugby union players
