= Douglas McLean =

Douglas or Doug McLean may refer to:

- Douglas McLean (rower) (1863–1901), also Somerset cricketer
- Doug McLean Sr. (1880–1947), Australian rugby union and rugby league player
- Doug McLean Jr. (1912–1961), Australian rugby union and rugby league player, son of Doug McLean Sr.

== See also ==
- Douglas MacLean, American actor
- Doug MacLean, Canadian sportscaster
- Douglas Maclean (1852–1929), New Zealand politician
