= Doug McLean Jr. =

Australian rugby footballer (1911–1961)

- Born: Alexander Douglas McLean; 24 July 1911 Roma, Queensland, Australia
- Died: 1961 (aged 49–50)

Rugby union career
- Position: Winger
International career
| Years | Team | Apps | (Points) |
| 1933-1936 | Australia | 10 | |
- Rugby league career

Playing information
- Position: Wing
Representative
| Years | Team | Pld | T | G | FG | P |
|---|---|---|---|---|---|---|
| 1937 | Australia | 2 | 3 | 0 | 0 | 9 |
- Father: Doug McLean Sr.
- Relatives: Jeff McLean (nephew); Peter McLean (nephew); Paul McLean (nephew); Bill McLean (brother)

Alexander Douglas McLean Jr. (15 December 1912 – 1961) was an Australian rugby union and rugby league footballer, a dual-code rugby international.

== Rugby union career ==
Born in Brisbane, McLean was the son of Doug McLean Sr., one of Australia's Dual-code rugby internationals. Doug Jr. is the brother of Wallabies Bill McLean and Jack McLean and the uncle of Wallabies Jeff, Paul and Peter McLean. See McLean Family (rugby footballers).

McLean played 10 Tests as a winger for the Wallabies between 1933 and 1936. His international rugby union debut was in 1933 against South Africa when he appeared in five Tests. He made Bledisloe Cup appearances against the All Blacks in 1934 and 1936, with the 1934 side the first Australian side to win the Bledisloe.

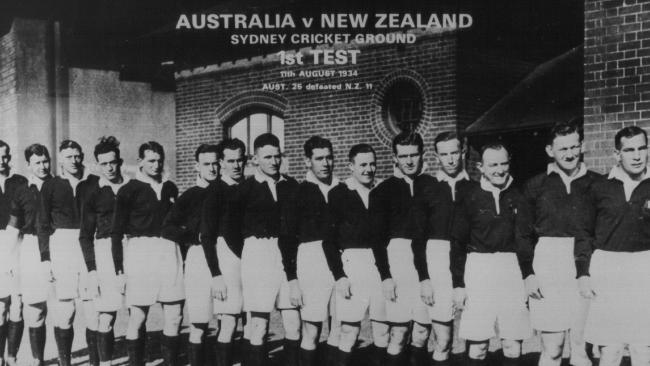
McLean with the victorious Bledisloe Wallabies, 1st Test v NZ 11 Aug 1934

== Rugby league career ==
He switched to the professional code and represented the Kangaroos on the wing in two Tests against New Zealand in 1937 and on eight tour games of the 1937 Tour of Great Britain and France.

His international rugby league debut in Auckland against New Zealand on 7 August 1937 saw McLean become Australia's 24th dual code rugby international, following Clarrie Prentice and preceding Ken Kearney. He was Australia's only dual-code international of the 1930s and of the 33-year period between 1919 and 1952.

== Sources ==
- The Spirit of Rugby (1995; collection of essays) HarperCollins, Australia
- Andrews, Malcolm (2006) The ABC of Rugby League, Australian Broadcasting Corp., Sydney
- Whiticker, Alan & Hudson, Glen (2006) The Encyclopedia of Rugby League Players, Gavin Allen Publishing, Sydney
