= Frederick Knight =

Frederick Knight may refer to:

- Frederick Knight (politician) (1812–1897), British Conservative Party politician
- Frederick Knight (singer) (born 1944), American R&B singer, songwriter and record producer
- Fred Knight (1885–1965), English rugby union player

== See also ==
- Frederick Knight Hunt (1814–1854), English journalist and author
