= Malcolm McArthur =

Australia international rugby union player

Mannie McArthur
- Born: Malcolm Julian McArthur; 30 July 1882 Sydney, New South Wales
- Died: 6 July 1961 (aged 78)

Rugby union career
- Position: flanker
International career
Years	Team	Apps	(Points)
1909	Wallabies	1	(0)
Medal record
Men's rugby union
Representing Australasia
Olympic Games
Gold medal – first place	1908 London	Team competition

Malcolm Julian "Mannie" McArthur (30 July 1882 – 6 July 1961) was an Australian rugby union national representative rugby union player. He won a gold medal in rugby at the 1908 Summer Olympics.

== Rugby career ==
McArthur's rugby career was played with the Eastern Suburbs RUFC in Sydney, Australia. He was selected in Australia's inaugural national rugby team to tour the northern hemisphere - Dr Paddy Moran's First Wallabies for the 1908–09 Australia rugby union tour of Britain.

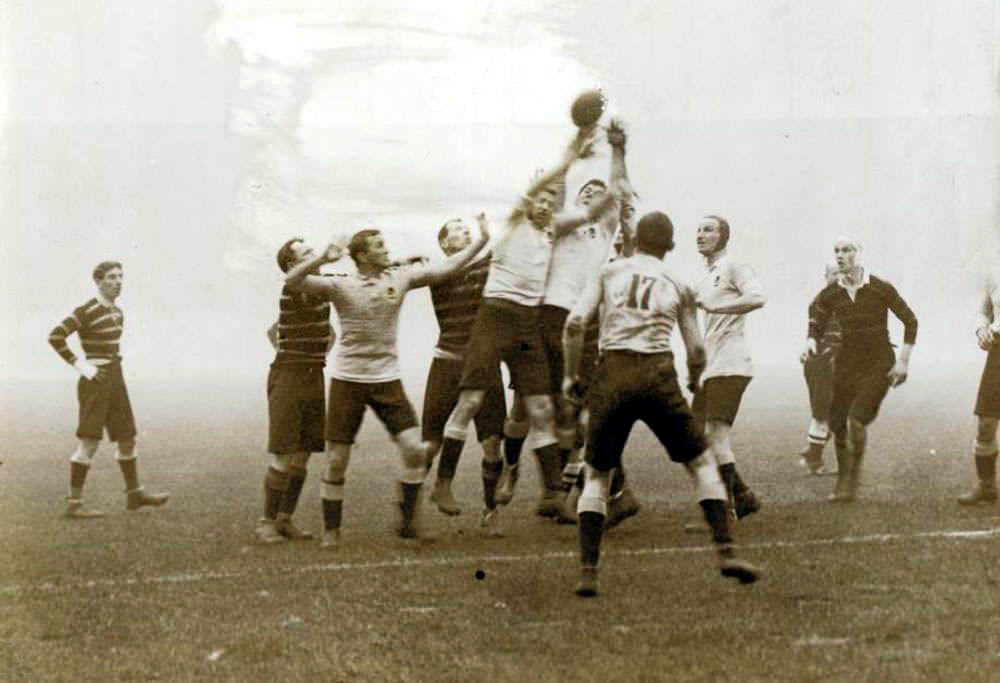
1908 Olympic Gold Final Wallabies v Cornwall.

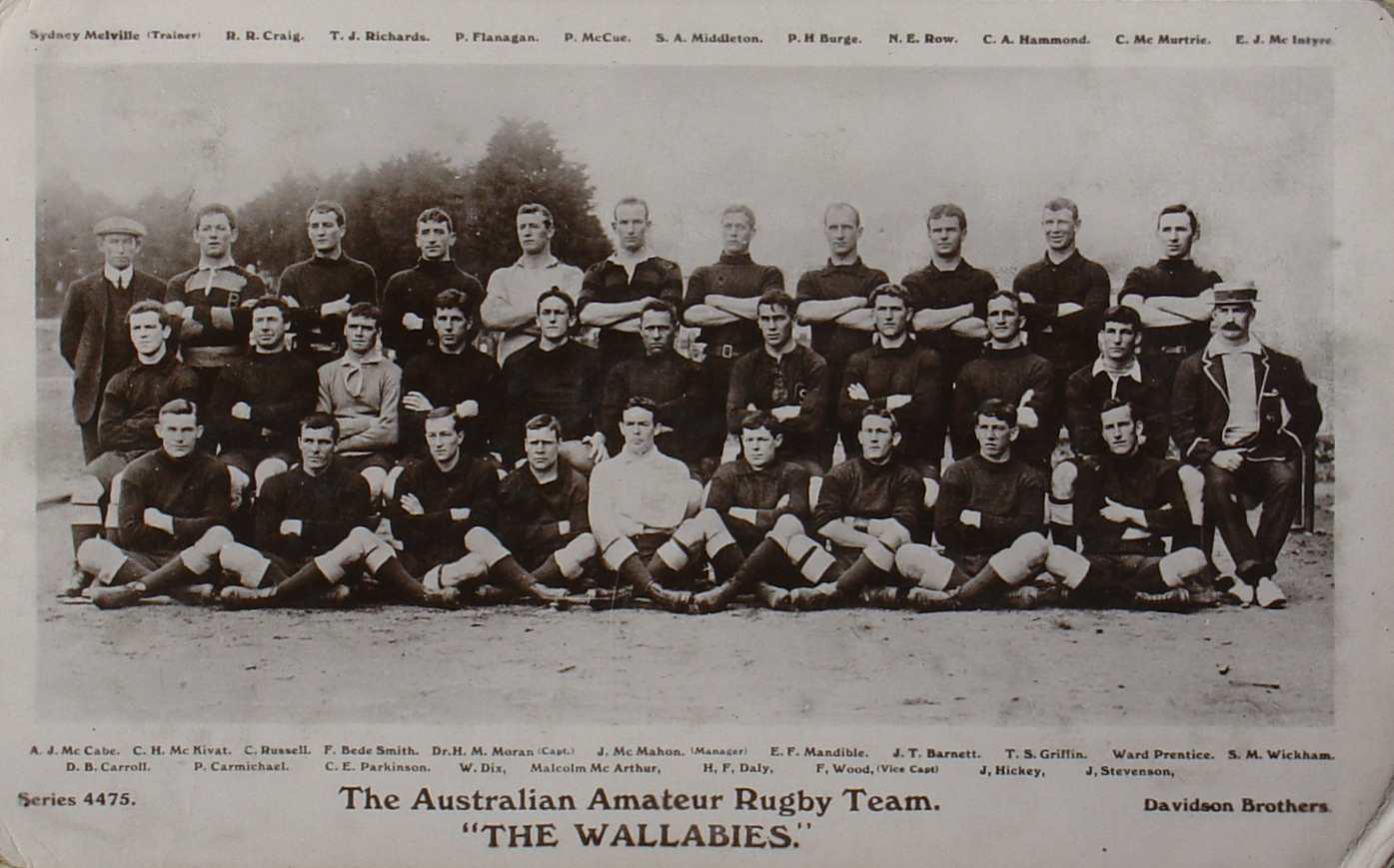
McArthur front row in white jersey, with the 1908 Wallaby tour squad

At the time, the rugby tournament for the London Olympics game may not have appeared to be of great significance. Australia had already beaten Cornwall, the British county champions, early in the tour, and Scotland, Ireland and France had all turned down the Rugby Football Union's invitation to participate in the Olympic bouts. Neither the tour captain, Moran, nor the vice-captain Fred Wood played, so Chris McKivat led the Wallabies to an easy 32–3 victory and to Olympic glory, with each Wallaby in that match thereafter an Olympic gold medallist.

McArthur made his test debut on that tour at Rectory Field, Blackheath, in the test against England in January 1909 - a match won by Australia 9–3.

== See also ==
- Rugby union at the 1908 Summer Olympics
