= Phil Carmichael =

Australia international rugby union player

- Born: Philip Patrick Carmichael; 25 January 1884 Sandgate, Queensland
- Died: September 1973 (aged 89)

Rugby union career
- Position: Centre
International career
Years	Team	Apps	(Points)
1904–09	Australia	4	(6)
Medal record
Men's rugby union
Representing Australasia
Olympic Games
Gold medal – first place	1908 London	Team competition

Philip Patrick Carmichael (25 January 1884 – September 1973) was a rugby union player who represented Australia. He won a gold medal in rugby at the 1908 Summer Olympics.

== Rugby career ==
Carmichael, a centre, was born in Sandgate, Queensland, and played his club rugby career was played in Queensland. He claimed a total of 4 international rugby caps for Australia. His debut game was against Great Britain at Brisbane on 23 July 1904. He was selected in Australia's inaugural national rugby team to tour the northern hemisphere – Dr. Paddy Moran's First Wallabies for the 1908–09 Australia rugby union tour of Britain.

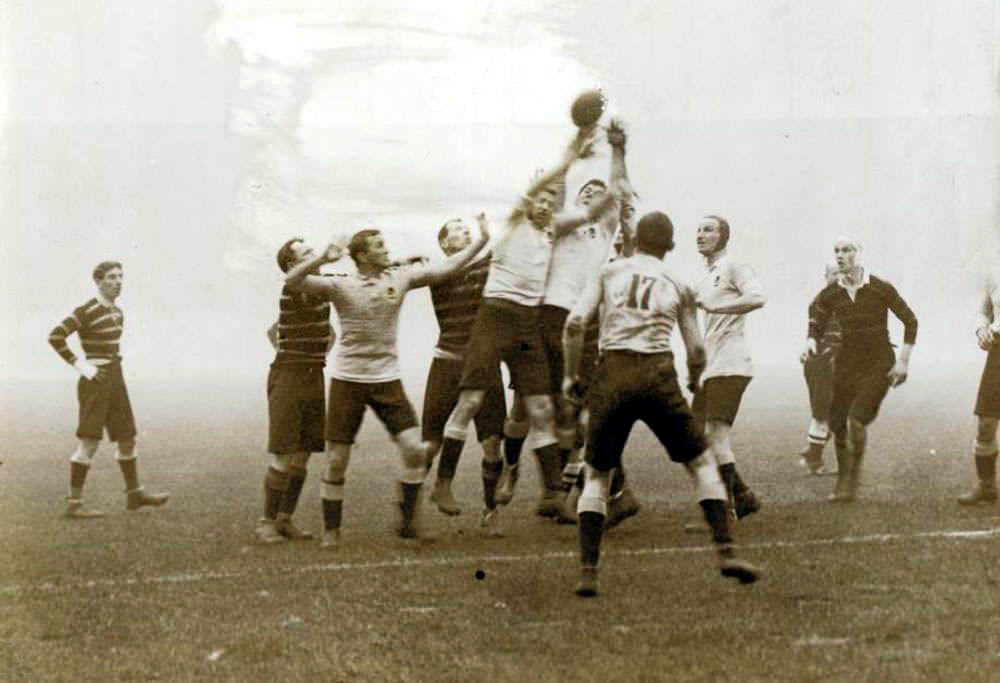
1908 Olympic Gold Final Wallabies v Cornwall.

At the time, the rugby tournament for the London Olympics game may not have appeared to be of great significance. Australia had already beaten Cornwall and the British county champions early in the tour, and Scotland, Ireland, and France had all turned down the Rugby Football Union's invitation to participate in the Olympic bouts. Neither the tour captain Moran, nor the vice-captain Fred Wood played, so Chris McKivat led the Wallabies to an easy 32–3 victory and to Olympic glory, in which Carmichael scored 11 points, then each Wallaby in that match were thereafter known as an Olympic gold medallist.

Phil Carmichael played in both tests of the tour, the 6–9 loss to Wales at Cardiff Arms Park, which was the first test played by an Australian team on British soil, as well as the test against England in January 1909 at Rectory Field, Blackheath, a match won by Australia 9–3.

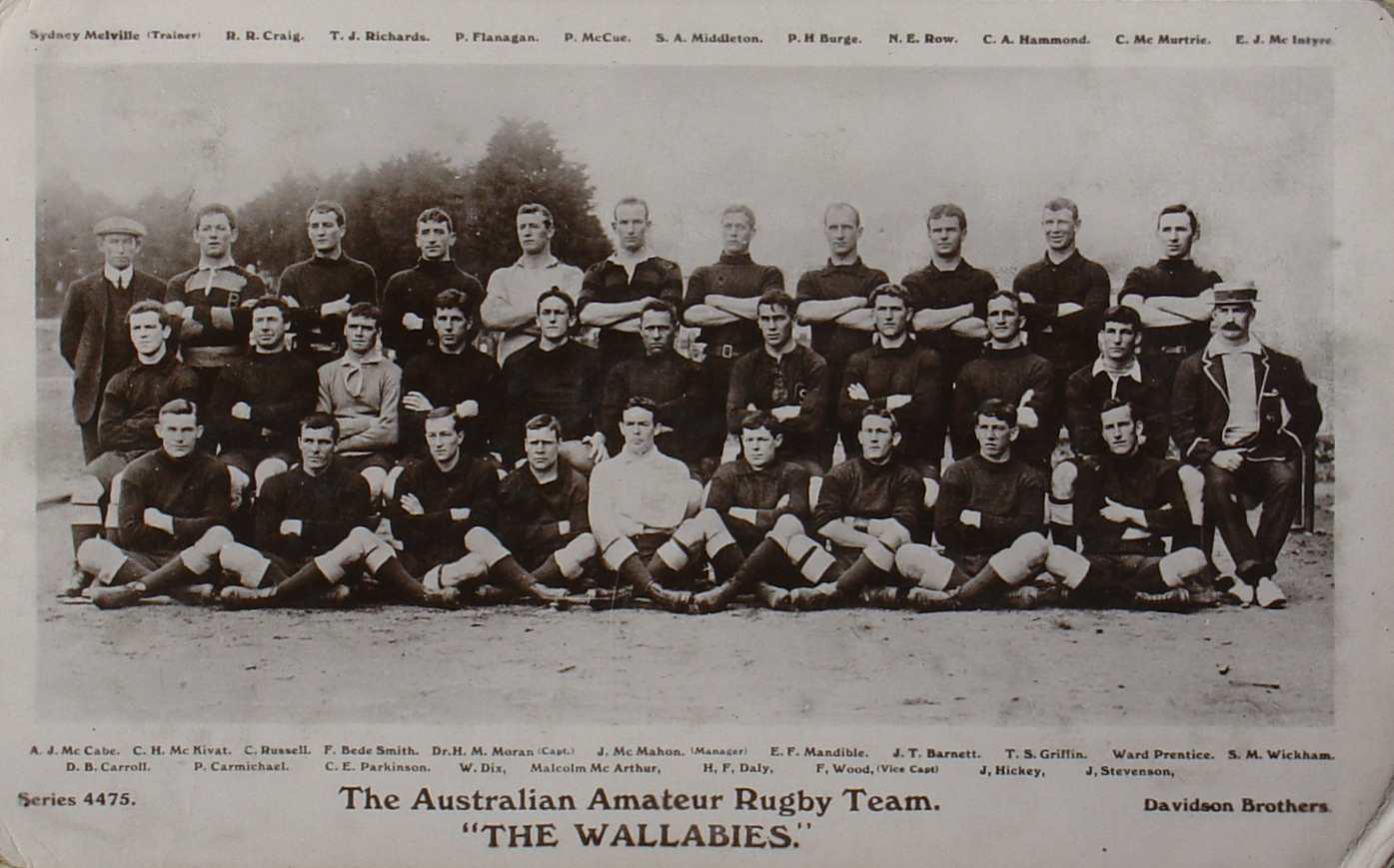
Carmichael front row 2nd from left, with the 1908 Wallaby tour squad

== See also ==
- Rugby union at the 1908 Summer Olympics
