= Barry Wright =

Barry Wright may refer to:

- Barry Wright (footballer)
- Barry Wright (rugby union)
- Barry "Fast" Wright, American member of hip hop duo 69 Boyz

== See also ==
- Barrie Wright, English footballer
