= Alec Henry =

Alec Henry may refer to:

- Albert Henry (cricketer), also known as Alec Henry, Aboriginal Australian cricketer
- Alec Henry (rugby union), Australian rugby union player
