= Wally Lewis (rugby union) =

- Full name: Llewellyn Stanley Lewis
- Born: 23 March 1912 Brisbane, Australia
- Died: 1 January 1990 (aged 77)

Rugby union career
- Position: Fly-half
International career
Years	Team	Apps	(Points)
1934–38	Australia	4	(0)

Llewellyn Stanley "Wally" Lewis (23 March 1912 – 1 January 1990) was an Australian rugby union international.

Lewis, born in Brisbane, played rugby league while attending Ithaca Creek State School, but later picked up rugby union at Brisbane State High School and was a Combined High Schools representative.

An elusive fly-half, Lewis was attached to the GPS club in Brisbane. He gained four Wallabies caps during his career, including both matches in the 1934 Bledisloe Cup-winning series. Injuries plagued him during his Wallabies years and he also had the misfortune of being part of the abandoned 1939–40 tour of Britain.

== See also ==
- List of Australia national rugby union players
