= Joseph Stevenson (rugby union) =

- Full name: Joseph Mason Stevenson
- Born: 19 September 1886 Mackay, QLD, Australia
- Died: 9 July 1941 (aged 54) Sydney, NSW Australia
- Height: 5 ft 9 in (175 cm)
- Weight: 11 st 10 lb (164 lb; 74 kg)

Rugby union career
- Position: Halfback
International career
| Years | Team | Apps | (Points) |
| 1908–09 | Australia | | |

Joseph Mason Stevenson (19 September 1886 – 9 July 1941) was an Australian international rugby union player.

Born in Mackay, Queensland, Stevenson was a product of Newcastle rugby, known by the nickname "Possum".

Stevenson was a surprise selection on the Wallabies squad for the 1908–09 tour of Britain, as a back up to their halfback Fred Wood. His only prior representative experience had been for the Combined Country Second XV. He appeared in only two uncapped matches, both during the Wales leg of the tour, against Penygraig and Glamorgan.

== See also ==
- List of Australia national rugby union players
