= Dooney Hayes =

- Full name: Edwin Sautelle Hayes
- Born: 10 August 1911 Toowoomba, Australia
- Died: 12 January 1943 (aged 31) North Africa

Rugby union career
- Position: Centre
International career
| Years | Team | Apps | (Points) |
| 1934–38 | Australia | 5 | (3) |

Edwin Sautelle "Dooney" Hayes (10 August 1911 — 12 January 1943) was an Australian rugby union international.

A Toowoomba Grammar School product, Hayes was a centre and played his early rugby for Toowoomba club Past Grammars. He broke into the Queensland representative team as a 19 year old and in 1934 joined GPS in Brisbane, from where he achieved Wallabies selection for that year's home Bledisloe Cup series, making his debut in the 1st Test at the Sydney Cricket Ground. In 1937, Hayes was appointed Wallabies captain for the tour of New Zealand, the first time an overseas tour had been led by a Queensland player, but a rib injury suffered in the opening fixture against Auckland would keep him out of the Test matches. He last appeared for the Wallabies in 1938 and finished with five Test caps.

Hayes was a flying officer in the Air Force during World War II and was stationed in the Middle East with the 2 Aircraft Delivery Unit RAF. He went missing in January, 1943, while flying a Kittyhawk over Libya. An accompanying aircraft last saw Hayes' plane near Marj and reported bad visibility. He was presumed to have been killed.

== See also ==
- List of Australia national rugby union players
