= Herbert Daly =

Australia international rugby union player

- Full name: Herbert Franks Daly
- Born: 9 January 1883 Mudgee, NSW, Australia
- Died: 26 May 1949 (aged 66) Wollongong, NSW, Australia

Rugby union career
- Position: Centre / Wing
Provincial / State sides
Years	Team	Apps	(Points)
- New South Wales
International career
Years	Team	Apps	(Points)
1908–09	Australia		

Herbert Franks Daly (9 January 1883 – 26 May 1949) was an Australian international rugby union player.

Daly was raised in the town of Mudgee in the Central West of New South Wales and attended school in Bathurst, along with a period boarding at Sydney's Saint Ignatius' College, Riverview. He played his rugby with Mudgee-Gulgong.

A three-quarter of slight build, Daly was known for his effective sidestepping abilities and debuted for New South Wales in 1907, before being called up by the Wallabies for the 1908–09 tour of Britain, during which he played four uncapped matches. His appearances came against Penygraig, Lancashire, North Glamorgan and Plymouth, all in winning teams.

== See also ==
- List of Australia national rugby union players
