= Charles Hammand =

Australian rugby union player

- Born: Charles Ackroyd Hammand; 9 May 1888 Waverley, New South Wales

Rugby union career
- Position: lock
International career
Years	Team	Apps	(Points)
1908–09	Wallabies	2	(0)

Charles Ackroyd Hammand (born 9 May 1888) was a rugby union player who represented Australia.

Hammand, a lock, was born in Waverley, New South Wales, and claimed a total of two international rugby caps for Australia. Both his Test appearances were on the 1908–09 Australia rugby union tour of Britain, in the first touring Wallaby squad.

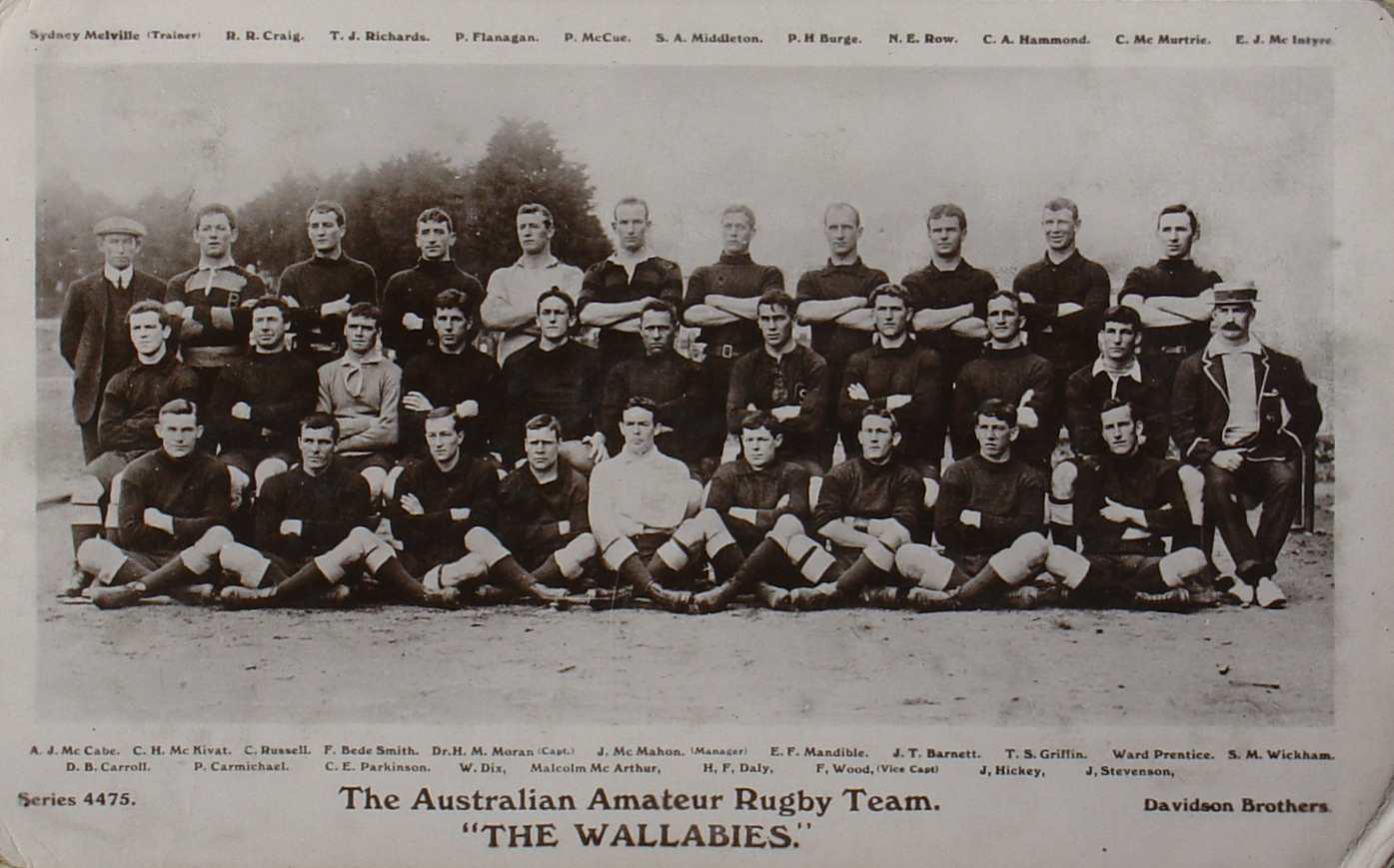
Hammond back row 3rd from right, with the 1908 Wallaby tour squad
