= Eric Assinder =

English rugby union player

- Full name: Eric Walter Assinder
- Born: 29 August 1888 Kings Norton, England
- Died: 11 October 1974 (aged 86) Stratford-upon-Avon, England

Rugby union career
- Position: Centre
International career
Years	Team	Apps	(Points)
1909	England	2	(0)

Eric Walter Assinder (29 August 1888 – 11 October 1974) was an English international rugby union player.

Born in Kings Norton, Birmingham, Assinder was an Old Edwardians and Midland Counties player, capped twice for England as a centre three-quarter in 1909. He made his debut against the touring 1908–09 Wallabies at Blackheath and retained his place for their Home Nations opener against Wales at Cardiff.

Assinder, a doctor by profession, was president of the Old Boys club at Old Edwardians.

== See also ==
- List of England national rugby union players
