= Aub Hodgson =

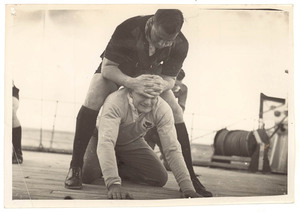
- Vay Wilson "assists" Hodgson with a neck strengthening exercise
- Born: Aubrey John Hodgson; 9 March 1912
- Died: 1982 (aged 69–70)
- School: Newington College

Rugby union career
- Position: Flanker
Senior career
Years	Team	Apps	(Points)
- Manly
Provincial / State sides
Years	Team	Apps	(Points)
- NSW Waratahs
International career
Years	Team	Apps	(Points)
1933-1939	Australia	11	

Aubrey John Hodgson (9 March 1912 – 1982) was an Australian rugby union forward and represented the Wallabies 11 times. Rugby writer Spiro Zavos has written that he was "as good as any contemporary player anywhere in the world" at his peak in the 1930s. The Sydney Morning Herald recorded that he can "fill any position in the forwards and his speed and sure hands make him a useful threequarter".

== Biography ==
As with many Australian rugby players prior to World War II, Hodgson grew up in a privileged environment with a family of substantial business interests and attended Newington College (1924-1929). He was six feet one inch tall and weighed 231 pounds.

In 1931, Hodgson was president of the Cullivel Australian rules football Club.

Hodgson was a member of the Wallabies team who arrived in England on 2 September 1939, one day before the declaration of war against Germany. On arrival, he helped fill sandbags, was received by King George VI and then returned to Australia. He and his brother, Ron, enlisted for wartime service in 1940 and this curtailed his chances of winning further representative caps.

He retired from playing in 1946 and became a first grade coach.
