= Ted McIntyre =

Australia international rugby union & league player (1883–1974)

- Full name: Edward Joseph McIntyre
- Born: 4 March 1883 Orange, NSW, Australia
- Died: 12 September 1974 (aged 91)
- Height: 5 ft 10 in (178 cm)
- Weight: 13 st 8 lb (86 kg)

Rugby union career
- Position: Prop
Provincial / State sides
Years	Team	Apps	(Points)
1907–08	New South Wales		
International career
Years	Team	Apps	(Points)
1908–09	Australia		
- Rugby league career

Playing information
- Position: Lock
Club
Years	Team	Pld	T	G	FG	P
1914–18	North Sydney	49	3			9

Edward Joseph McIntyre (4 March 1883 – 12 September 1974) was an Australian rugby union and rugby league player.

A prop, McIntyre was a product of New South Wales country rugby, playing for his native Orange in the Central Western Union. He made his New South Wales representative debut in 1907 on a tour of Western Australia.

McIntyre got called up by the Wallabies for the 1908–09 tour of Britain, which was the first ever northern hemisphere tour undertaken by the national team. He was largely overlooked during the tour, with his only appearances coming in uncapped matches against Penygraig, Neath & Aberavon, Llanelly and Yorkshire.

Soon after returning home, McIntyre made the switch to rugby league and had a spell with North Sydney.

== See also ==
- List of Australia national rugby union players
