= Bill Dix (rugby union) =

- Born: William Dix; 1883 or 1887 Newcastle, New South Wales
- Died: circa 1944

Rugby union career
- Position: fullback
International career
Years	Team	Apps	(Points)
1907–09	Wallabies	4	(0)

William Dix (1883 or 1887–circa 1944) was a rugby union player who represented Australia.

Dix, a fullback, was born in Newcastle, New South Wales and claimed a total of 4 international rugby caps for Australia.

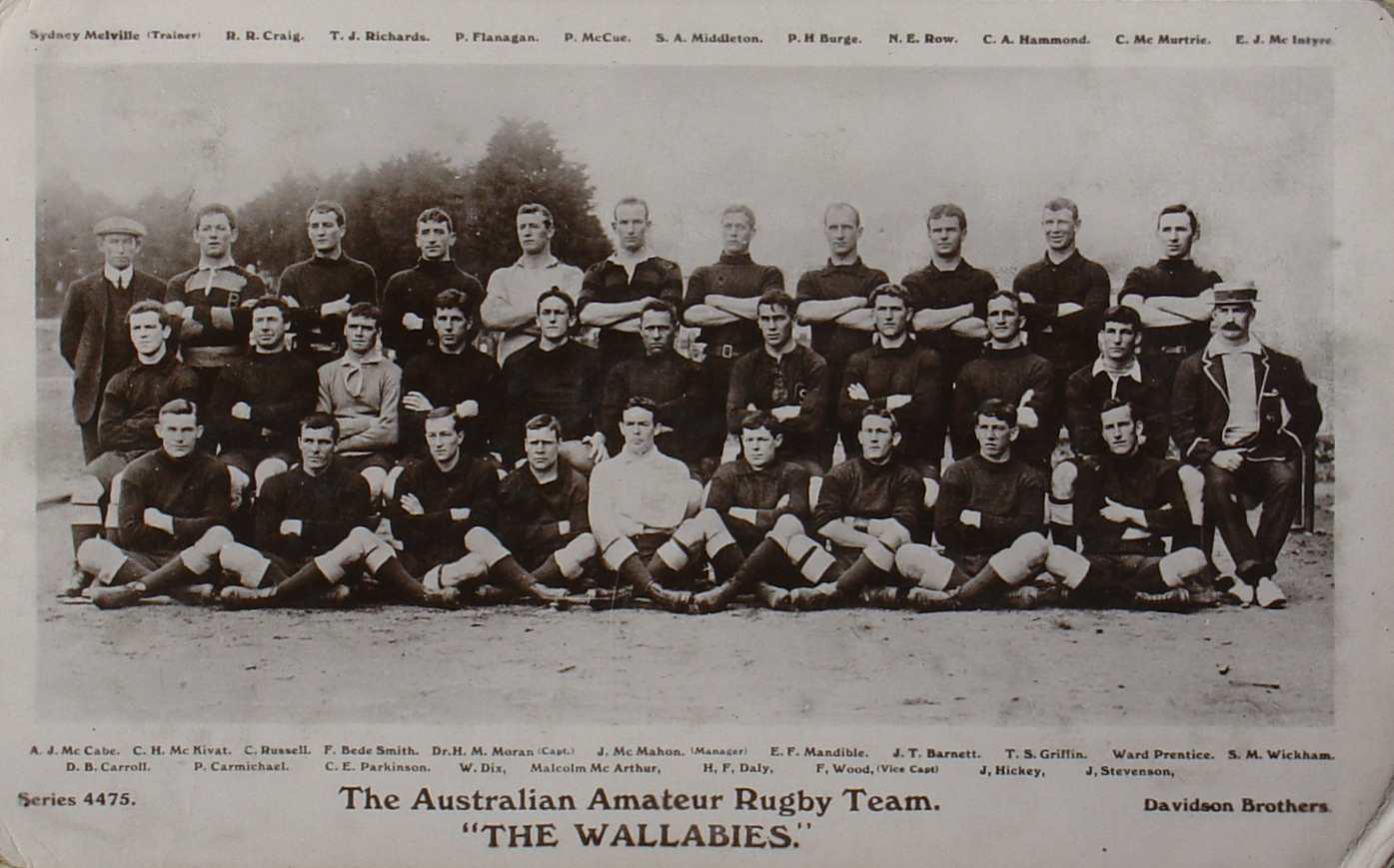
Dix front row 4th from left, with the 1908 Wallaby tour squad
