= Norm Row =

- Born: Norman Edward Row; 23 March 1883 Manly, New South Wales
- Died: 28 October 1968 (aged 85)
- Notable relative: Frank Row

Rugby union career
- Position: flanker
International career
Years	Team	Apps	(Points)
1907–10	Wallabies	6	(15)

Norman Edward Row (23 March 1883 – 28 October 1968) was a rugby union player who represented in the Australia national rugby union team. His brother Frank Row was Australia's inaugural rugby Test captain in 1899.

Row, a flanker}, was born in Manly, New South Wales and claimed a total of 6 international rugby caps for Australia.

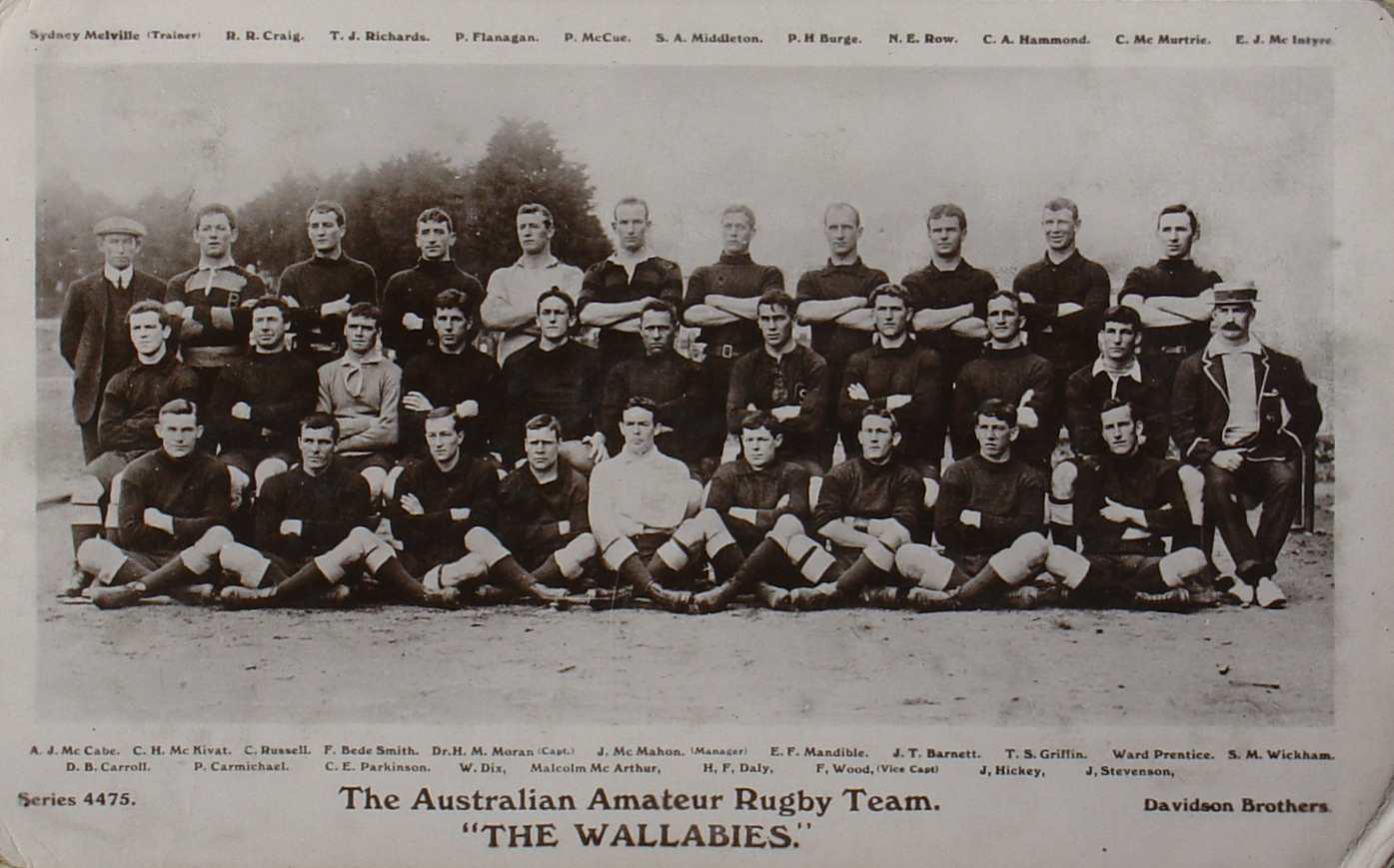
Row, back row 4th from right, with the 1908 Wallaby tour squad
