= Edward Mandible =

Australian rugby union and rugby league footballer

- Born: Edward Francis Mandible; 11 May 1885 Woolloomooloo, Sydney
- Died: 3 April 1936 (age 50) Karrakatta, Western Australia

Rugby union career
- Position: fly-half
International career
Years	Team	Apps	(Points)
1907–08	Australia	3	(0)
- Rugby league career

Playing information
- Position: Five-eighth
Club
Years	Team	Pld	T	G	FG	P
1910	Eastern Suburbs	2				3

Edward Francis Mandible (11 May 1885 – 3 April 1936) was an Australia national representative rugby union fly-half and one of the pioneers who broke away from that code to take up rugby league in Sydney in 1910.

== Early life ==
Mandible was born in Woolloomooloo, Sydney.

== Rugby union career ==
Mandible was selected on the first Wallaby 1908–09 Australia rugby union tour of the British Isles and France, the squad captained by Herbert Moran. He played in the first Test match of the tour against Wales on 12 December 1908 in Cardiff. He claimed a career total of three international rugby caps for Australia.

His jersey from the first Wallabies Rugby Union Tour of the United Kingdom in 1908 was purchased by the National Museum of Australia.

== Rugby league career ==
Following his return from the 1908-09 Wallaby tour he took part in a series of matches between the Australian Wallabies and Kangaroos in 1909. Facing reprisals from rugby union for playing in this non-sanctioned series, Mandible switched codes in 1910 to play rugby league with the Eastern Suburbs club. He played just two matches for Easts, scoring one try.

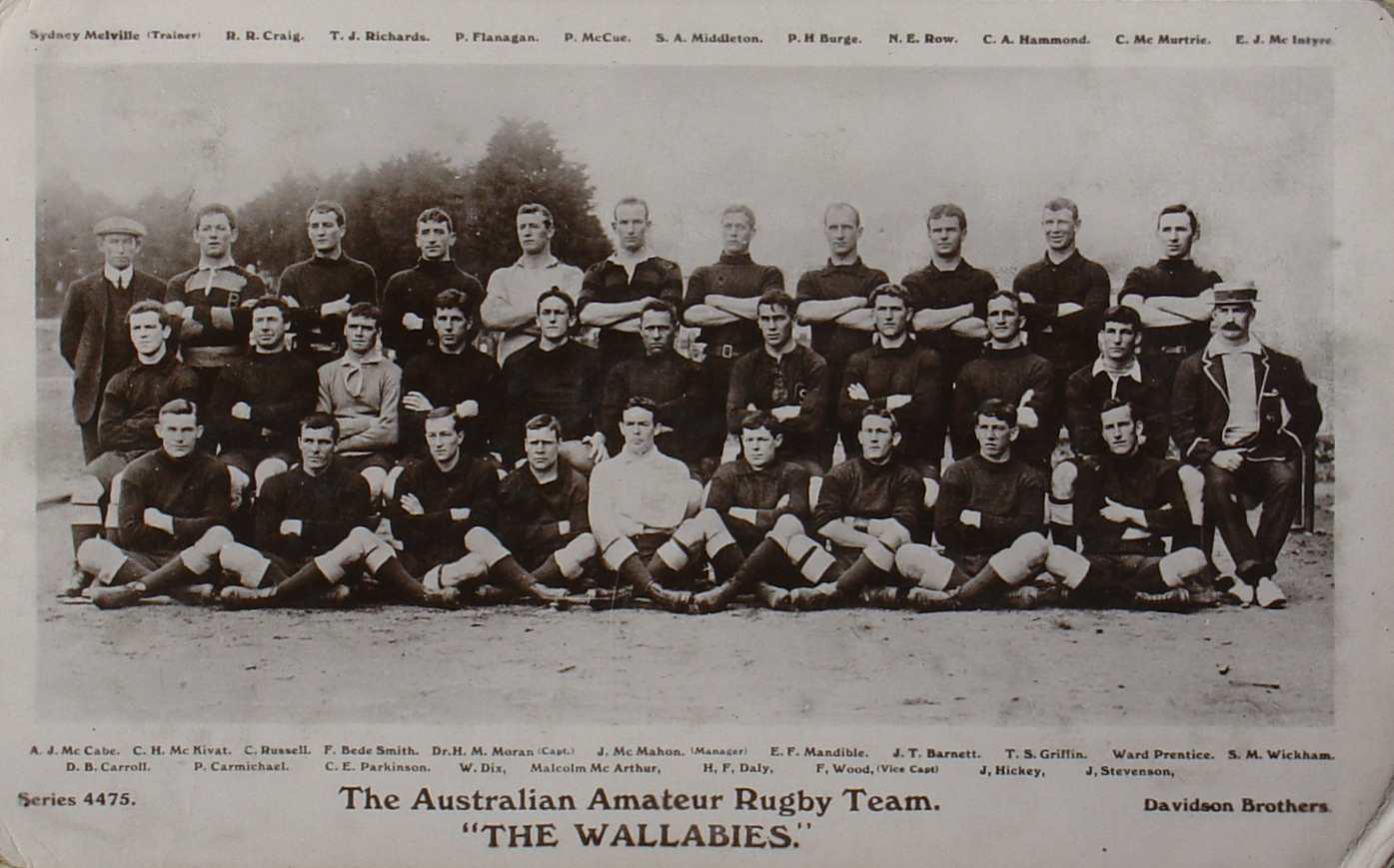
Mandible middle row 5th from right, with the 1908 Wallaby tour squad

== Death ==
Edward Mandible died in Perth, Western Australia in April 1936. He was buried at Karrakatta Cemetery, in Perth, Western Australia on 4 April 1936.
