= Jack McLean (rugby union, born 1922) =

- Full name: John Reginald McLean
- Born: 25 February 1922 Brisbane, Australia
- Died: 24 September 1974 (aged 52)
- Height: 5 ft 11 in (180 cm)
- Weight: 13.2 st (185 lb; 84 kg)
- School: St Laurence's College
- Notable relative(s): Doug McLean Sr (father); Doug McLean Jr (brother); Bill McLean (brother)

Rugby union career
- Position: Wing
Provincial / State sides
Years	Team	Apps	(Points)
- Queensland
International career
Years	Team	Apps	(Points)
1946	Australia		

John Reginald McLean (25 February 1922 – 24 September 1974) was an Australian international rugby union player.

== Biography ==
Raised in Brisbane, McLean was the son of Wallabies representative Doug McLean senior. Two of his brothers, Bill and Doug junior, were also capped for the Wallabies. He was educated at St Laurence's College, where he played rugby league. His ironic nickname of "Happy Jack" was coined as he was said to rarely smile.

McLean picked up rugby union after joining GPS Old Boys upon leaving school and became a three–quarter like his father, specialising on the wing. He made his Queensland representative debut in 1941, then was out of rugby for a period when he enlisted with the RAAF in World War II. While based with a squadron in England, McLean resumed rugby playing for the RAAF team. He spent the remainder of his rugby career with heavy padding to his right shoulder, having suffered injuries in a plane crash during his service. In 1946, McLean toured New Zealand with the Wallabies, making a total of six appearances, without featuring against the All Blacks.

== See also ==
- List of Australia national rugby union players
