= Don Lowth =

Australia international rugby union & league player

- Full name: Donald Richard Lowth
- Born: 20 October 1931 Collinsville, Qld, Australia
- Died: 18 June 2009 (aged 77) Melbourne, Victoria, Australia

Rugby union career
- Position: Flanker
International career
Years	Team	Apps	(Points)
1958	Australia	1	(0)
- Rugby league career

Playing information
- Position: Second-row
Club
Years	Team	Pld	T	G	FG	P
1960	North Sydney	4				0

Donald Richard Lowth (20 October 1931 – 18 June 2009) was an Australian international rugby union player. He also played first-grade rugby league for North Sydney.

== Biography ==
Born in the Whitsundays town of Collinsville, Lowth played club rugby for Brisbane-based club GPS. In 1953, Lowth and a GPS teammate appeared under assumed names for the American All-Stars, a touring rugby league team for the United States. When Queensland rugby officials found out he was banned and subsequently moved to Melbourne.

While in Melbourne, Lowth continued to play rugby union and became a Victorian state representative. During this time he also trialled with Australian rules football club Richmond.

By 1957 he had moved to Sydney, where he played rugby union for Manly. He attempted to compete in trials that year for the national team but was deemed to be ineligible after being recognised by Australian Rugby Union chairman Tom McCormack while playing in Sydney. The ban was eventually revoked and in 1958 he toured New Zealand and featured in the first Bledisloe Cup test match in Wellington, as a replacement flanker for John Thornett.

In the 1960 NSWRFL season he made four first-grade rugby league appearances for North Sydney, playing as a second-row forward.
