= Vay Wilson =

Australia international rugby union player (1912–1962)

Vayro Wilson
- Born: Vayro William Wilson; 18 January 1912
- Died: 1962 (aged 49–50)
- School: Gympie High School
- University: University of Queensland

Rugby union career
- Position: Prop
Senior career
Years	Team	Apps	(Points)
1934–1939	University of Queensland Rugby Club		
Provincial / State sides
Years	Team	Apps	(Points)
1935–1939	Queensland		
International career
Years	Team	Apps	(Points)
1937–1938	Australia	5	

Vayro William Wilson, DSC (18 January 1912 – 1962) was an Australian naval officer and a state and national representative rugby union player who captained the Wallabies in three Test matches immediately prior to the Second World War. He was selected to captain the ill-fated 1939–40 Australia rugby union tour of Britain and Ireland, which was cancelled because of the outbreak of war.

== Rugby career ==
Wilson was a Queenslander whose club rugby was played at the University of Queensland Rugby Club. He came to the attention of selectors when he made the Australian Universities team in 1934 and he was in the 1938 University side, which won the 1938 Brisbane grade premiership. From 1935 to 1939 he was an automatic choice in the front-row for the Queensland state team. In his debut year for Queensland he played against the New Zealand Māori but it would not be until 1937 that he would play for his country.

Wilson debuted internationally against the Springboks in the 1st test of 1937 at the Sydney Cricket Ground. Australia lost 5–9 in a hard-fought tussle. He was the only Queenslander to retain his spot for the 2nd Test with the Wallabies again losing, this time 17–26. Wilson was knocked out in a brutal start to the match but he regained his consciousness and composure and returned to the match. Howell quotes Ian Diehm in Red ! Red ! Red ! asserting that Wilson's "dignified bearing in this match led the selectors to name him captain of the Australian team the following season against the All Blacks".

== Captaincy and 1939 ==
Only six Queenslanders had preceded Wilson to the Australian team captaincy when he assumed it against the All Blacks in July 1938 in the 1st Test of their tour of Australia. He led Queensland against them the following week and retained his national captaincy for the 2nd and 3rd tests. Australia lost all three games, although the margins were tight in games two and three at 6 and 8 points respectively.

When the trials for the 1939 British Isles touring squad were held Cyril Towers made a comeback but the selectors opted for Wilson to retain the captaincy and his front-row position. The team left Australia on the ship Mooltan and Wilson did an excellent job keeping the squad fit on the journey. The team docked at Southampton on the day when England declared war on Nazi Germany. After a couple of weeks spent filling sandbags to start the war effort, a pub crawl around the West Country, and a meeting with the royal family, the squad set sail for Australia having not played a game. Of the unlucky tourists only Bill McLean, Keith Windon and Len Smith would return to footballing success after the war.

The Whiticker reference records that "the squad played an exhibition match in Bombay on the journey home so that the players could be afforded international status". However rugby league historian Sean Fagan casts doubt on this, citing his 1998 interview with squad member Len Smith wherein Smith advised that the game was played between one-half of the touring squad against the other with extra numbers made up by some military personnel on hand in Bombay. This is supported by the Pollard reference which records that the Wallabies played against a "Gymkhana XV made up of military men and others".

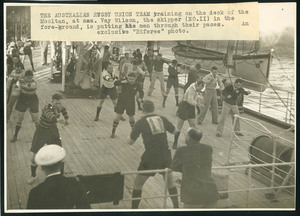
Wilson leads team training on deck en route to England 1939.

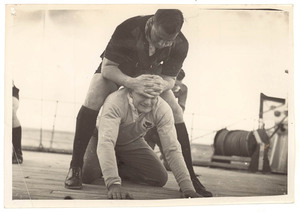
Wilson "assists" Aub Hodgson with a neck strengthening exercise.

== War service ==
Wilson came back to Australia with the touring team but left shortly after to return to England. He had finished his Master of Arts at the University of Queensland and had received a Carnegie Fellowship to study in England.

He joined the Royal Naval Volunteer Reserve during the war and was awarded the Distinguished Service Cross for his action in the English Channel in a PT boat.

== Sources ==
- Howell, Max (2005) Born to Lead – Wallaby Test Captains, Celebrity Books, Auckland NZ
- Whiticker, Alan (2004) Captaining the Kangaroos, New Holland, Sydney
- Pollard, Jack (1984) Australian Rugby Union: The Game and the Players Angus and Robertson Publishing
- Fagan, Sean (2000–2006) RL1908.com

Preceded by Cyril Towers	Australian national rugby union captain 1938	Succeeded by Bill McLean
