= Fred Knight =

English rugby union player (1885–1965)

Frederick Frank Knight
- Born: Frederick Frank Knight; 22 March 1885 Stoke Damerel, Devon, England
- Died: 3 August 1965 (aged 80) Plymouth, Devon, England

Rugby union career
- Position: Forward
Amateur team(s)
Years	Team	Apps	(Points)
–	Plymouth		
–	Devon		
International career
Years	Team	Apps	(Points)
1909	England	1	(0)

Frederick Frank Knight (22 March 1885 – 3 August 1965) was an English rugby union forward who played for Plymouth and won one cap for England in 1909 against Australia.

== Early life ==
Knight was born on 22 March 1885 at Stoke Damerel, Devon, and was baptised there on 20 April 1885. He was the son of Samuel Knight, a stonemason, and Mary Ann Knight (née Skinner) and one of ten siblings.

Knight entered the dockyard trades as a shipwright apprentice and later worked as a draughtsman at HM Dockyard Devonport. By 1921 he was recorded as a shipbuilding draughtsman.

He married Annie Louise Knight at St Barnabas Church, Devonport, in 1912.

== Rugby career ==
=== Plymouth ===
Knight played as a forward for Plymouth and had established himself as a leading member of the pack by 1906, when he was identified as club captain in contemporary reporting. Throughout the late 1900s he was regularly listed among Plymouth's forwards in major fixtures, including matches against Welsh opposition. Press coverage in 1911 confirms that he was commonly referred to as “Fred Knight” and recognised as a leader within the side. Reports from that season noted his return after a short absence, stating that the pack benefited from his inclusion.

In December 1911 it was reported:

“The turn of events dates from the re-appearance of Fred Knight, whose leadership is very well known. Knight is playing grandly, and his example is being closely followed.”

=== Devon ===
Knight's club performances led to repeated selection for Devon in the County Championship. He appeared in representative fixtures including Devon v Durham in 1907, Devon v Cornwall in 1909, and Yorkshire v Devon in 1911. His consistent inclusion in the county pack placed him among the leading forwards in West Country rugby.

=== International trial and England (1909) ===
In November 1908 Knight was selected for an international trial representing “The West”, a match used to determine England selection. Ahead of the 1909 international against Australia, it was noted that Knight would be absent from club duties “playing for England against Australia”, and although his selection had surprised some observers unfamiliar with his form, he was considered unlikely to disappoint.

Knight was selected to play for England against Australia at Blackheath on 9 January 1909. The published team list recorded him as “Knight (Plymouth), forward”.

Match reports describe England beginning strongly, with Knight leading a forward rush in the first half that transferred play deep into Australian territory and raised home enthusiasm. England scored through a try by Edgar Mobbs following scrum possession, but Australia equalised before the interval. In the second half Australia gained territorial control and ultimately won by three tries to one (9–3).

This match proved to be Knight's only appearance for England.

=== Suspension (1912) ===
In December 1912 Knight was named in the findings of an English Rugby Union Commission investigating allegations of professionalism in West Country rugby.

The inquiry examined breaches of the strict amateur regulations, including so-called “broken time” payments. Knight was listed among those suspended as a result of the investigation, alongside other Plymouth and Devon players.

The disciplinary action formed part of a wider crackdown affecting West Country rugby and effectively marked the end of Knight's representative career.

== Death ==
Knight died in Plymouth on 3 August 1965, aged 80.
