= Peter Flanagan (rugby union) =

Australia international rugby union player (1886–1952)

- Born: Peter Flanagan c. 1886 Dublin
- Died: c. 1952 (aged 65–66) California, United States

Rugby union career
- Position: flanker
International career
Years	Team	Apps	(Points)
1907	Wallabies	2	(0)

Peter Flanagan (c. 1886–c. 1952) was a rugby union player who represented Australia.

Flanagan, a flanker, was born in Dublin and claimed a total of 2 international rugby caps for Australia.
