= Tim Atkinson =

Australian rugby union player (born 1977)

- Full name: Timothy Atkinson
- Born: 5 July 1977 (age 49) Mackay, QLD, Australia
- Height: 178 cm (5 ft 10 in)
- Weight: 85 kg (187 lb)

Rugby union career
- Position: Utility back
Super Rugby
Years	Team	Apps	(Points)
2002	Brumbies	9	(15)
2003–06	Reds	20	(5)

Timothy Atkinson (born 5 July 1977) is an Australian former professional rugby union player.

== Biography ==
Atkinson was born in Mackay and educated at Slade Point State School.

=== Rugby career ===
A utility back, Atkinson captained Australia in rugby sevens and featured at the 2002 Commonwealth Games.

Atkinson was an Australia "A" representative and competed for the ACT Brumbies in the 2002 Super 12 season as an outside centre, with George Gregan occupying his favoured position of scrum-half. In 2003, Atkinson returned to his native Queensland to play with the Reds, where he was used in most backline positions. His time at the Reds was impacted by injury, missing most of 2003 with a broken ankle, playing all but one Super 12 match in 2004, before being sidelined for all of 2005 by shoulder surgery. He had a stint in Japan with Kyuden Voltex and was a player-coach for South Darwin on his return home.
