= Peter Thompson (rugby union, born 1926) =

Australia international rugby union player (1922-1997)

- Born: Peter Donald Thompson; 20 March 1926 Brisbane, Queensland, Australia
- Died: 1 March 1997 (aged 75)

Rugby union career
- Position: wing
International career
Years	Team	Apps	(Points)
1950	Wallabies	1	(0)

Peter Donald Thompson (20 March 1926 – 1 March 1997) was a rugby union player who represented Australia.

Thompson, a wing, was born in Brisbane, Queensland in March 1926 and claimed 1 international rugby cap for Australia.

He died in March 1997 at the age of 75.
