= Frederick Timbury =

Australian sportsman

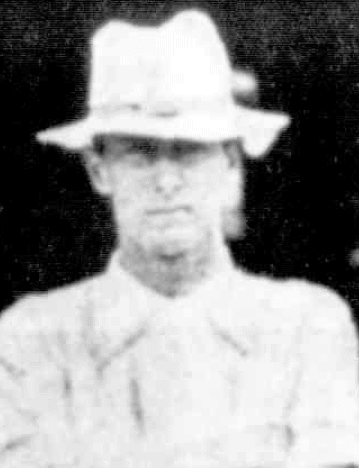
- Born: Frederick Richard Vaughan Timbury; 12 July 1885 Gladstone, Queensland
- Died: 14 April 1945 Sydney

Rugby union career
- Position: lock
International career
Years	Team	Apps	(Points)
1910	Wallabies	2	(0)

Frederick Richard Vaughan Timbury (12 July 1885 – 14 April 1945) was an Australian rugby union player who represented Australia.

Timbury, a lock, was born in Gladstone, Queensland and claimed a total of 2 international rugby caps for Australia.

He also represented Queensland at cricket and tennis. A fast bowler, he played six first-class matches for Queensland, taking 14 wickets.

He became a solicitor, and was an outspoken advocate for water diversion irrigation for western Queensland. He was mayor of Roma when he died in 1945.
