= Peter McLean (rugby union) =

Australian rugby union international

- Full name: Peter William McLean
- Born: 8 February 1954 (age 72) Brisbane, QLD, Australia

Rugby union career
- Position: Lock
International career
Years	Team	Apps	(Points)
1978–82	Australia	16	(0)

Peter William McLean (born 8 February 1954) is an Australian former rugby union international.

Born in Brisbane, McLean attended Brisbane State High School and Gatton Agricultural College. He is a member of a famous rugby family, as one of seven Wallaby representatives. His father Bill McLean captained the Wallabies and his grandfather Doug McLean senior was a dual-code international. Cousin Paul McLean was a Wallaby teammate.

McLean, nicknamed "Spider", played first-grade for Brisbane club Easts and made his Queensland debut in 1976. He was capped 16 times as a Wallabies lock between 1978 and 1982. His international career included the Bledisloe Cup wins of 1979 and 1980, which was the first time the Wallabies had secured back to back series wins.

== See also ==
- List of Australia national rugby union players
