= Donald Crichton-Miller =

Scotland international rugby union player

- Born: 7 December 1906 Sanremo, Italy
- Died: 5 August 1997 (aged 90) Compton, Berkshire, England
- School: Fettes College
- University: Pembroke College, Cambridge
- Notable relative: Hugh Crichton-Miller (father)
- Occupation: Schoolmaster

Rugby union career
- Position: Wing-forward
International career
Years	Team	Apps	(Points)
1931	Scotland	3	(6)

Donald Crichton-Miller (7 December 1906 – 5 August 1997) was a British teacher, headmaster, and Scotland international rugby union player of the 1930s.

Born in Sanremo, Crichton-Miller was the eldest son of then Italy-based psychiatrist Hugh Crichton-Miller. He was head of school at Fettes College, Edinburgh, and attended Pembroke College, Cambridge, earning rugby blues in 1928.

Crichton-Miller, a wing-forward, played for Gloucester from 1929 to 1931, while teaching at Monmouth High School, then moved on to Bath when he joined Bryanston School. During the 1931 Five Nations, Crichton-Miller gained three Scotland caps, scoring two tries on his debut against Wales at Cardiff Arms Park. He was a Hampshire representative player and competed for London Counties against the touring 1931–32 Springboks.

Retiring from rugby in 1934, Crichton-Miller briefly taught at Stowe School and in 1936 was appointed the new Taunton School headmaster. He was the first postwar headmaster of his old school Fettes College, a role he held until 1958, then had five years as headmaster back at Stowe School before retiring.

== See also ==
- List of Scotland national rugby union players
