= Boyd Oxlade (rugby union) =

Rugby player (1914–1963)

- Full name: Boyd Davies Oxlade
- Born: 10 May 1914 Brisbane, Australia
- Died: 29 June 1963 (aged 49)

Rugby union career
- Position: Flanker
International career
Years	Team	Apps	(Points)
1938	Australia	3	(0)

Boyd Davies Oxlade (10 May 1914 — 29 June 1963) was an Australian rugby union international.

Born in Brisbane, Oxlade was the son of Wallabies captain Allen Oxlade and attended Church of England Grammar School. He was a flanker and won a hat-trick of premierships with Eagle Junction, before crossing to GPS in 1938.

Oxlade was capped three times for the Wallabies against the All Blacks on New Zealand's 1938 tour of Australia. This was followed by selection for the 1939–40 tour of Britain and Ireland, which had to be abandoned two days after Oxlade and his teammates arrived in England, due to the British declaration of war.

His son, also named Boyd, was an author best known for writing Death in Brunswick.

== See also ==
- List of Australia national rugby union players
