= Bill Douglas (rugby union) =

Australian rugby union player

- Born: William A. Douglas c. 1898 Sydney

Rugby union career
- Position: ?
International career
Years	Team	Apps	(Points)
1922	Wallabies	1	(0)

William A. Douglas (born c. 1898) was a rugby union player who represented Australia.

Douglas was born in Sydney and claimed one international rugby cap for Australia.
