= Ken Gavin =

Australia international rugby union player

- Ken Gavin in team uniform and wearing test cap
- Born: Kenneth Australia Gavin; 20 January 1883 Cudal, New South Wales
- Died: 24 May 1956 (aged 73) Orange, NSW

Rugby union career
- Position: prop
International career
Years	Team	Apps	(Points)
1909	Australia	1	(0)

Kenneth Australia Gavin (20 January 1883 – 24 May 1956) was a rugby union player who represented Australia.

Gavin, a prop, was born in Cudal, New South Wales and claimed 1 international rugby cap for Australia.
