= Cecil Murnin =

- Full name: Cecil Egan Murnin
- Born: 1 March 1883 Sydney, NSW, Australia
- Died: 25 April 1921 (aged 38) Bombala, NSW, Australia
- Height: 6 ft 2 in (188 cm)
- Weight: 82 kg (181 lb)

Rugby union career
- Position: Loose forward
Provincial / State sides
| Years | Team | Apps | (Points) |
- New South Wales
International career
| Years | Team | Apps | (Points) |
| 1905, 1908–09 | Australia | | |

Cecil Egan Murnin (1 March 1883 – 25 April 1921) was an Australian international rugby union player.

Murnin grew up in Sydney, attending Sydney Church of England Grammar School. He served as a Colonial Light Horse lieutenant in the Second Boer War and was a midshipman with the NSW Naval contingent during the Boxer Rebellion.

A wiry Eastern Suburbs breakaway, Murnin made his NSW representative debut in 1904 and the following year toured New Zealand with the Wallabies. He didn't make the team for the one-off Test in Dunedin, then broke his collarbone during a match against Taranaki/Wanganui, which ended his tour early. In 1907, Murnin was captain of the New South Wales side that defeated the All Blacks 14–0 in Sydney. He received an international recall for the third of the 1907 All Blacks Test matches, only to have to withdraw from the side after his sister died. The following year, Murnin made the Wallabies squad to tour Great Britain, but became ill with peritonitis on the trip over and had to be sent home.

Murnin served again during World War I and died young in 1921, at the age of 38.

== See also ==
- List of Australia national rugby union players
