= Doug McLean Sr. =

Australia dual-code international rugby footballer (1878-1947)

- Born: Douglas James McLean; 15 April 1880 Ipswich, Queensland
- Died: 20 November 1947 (aged 69)
- Notable relative(s): Doug McLean, Jr. (son); Bill McLean (son); Jeff McLean (grandson); Peter McLean (grandson); Paul McLean (grandson)

Rugby union career
- Position: centre
International career
Years	Team	Apps	(Points)
1904–05	Australia	3	(3)
- Rugby league career

Playing information
- Position: Wing
Representative
Years	Team	Pld	T	G	FG	P
1908	Queensland	1	0	0	0	0
1908	Australia	2	0	0	0	0

Douglas James McLean Sr. (15 April 1880 – 20 November 1947) was a pioneer Australian representative dual-code international rugby union and rugby league footballer. He also represented Queensland in rugby league.

== Rugby union career ==
Born in Brisbane, Queensland McLean earned his debut as a centre with the Australian representative team playing against Great Britain, at Brisbane, on 23 July 1904. In total he played three tests, twice against the touring Great Britain side in 1904 and then in New Zealand the following year.

== Rugby league career ==
McLean was a registered rugby union player in Queensland in 1908 at the time of the rugby league code's inaugural competition year in Australia. He was selected in the first ever Queensland Maroons state representative side to play the new "Northern Union" style of rugby, taking on Albert Baskerville's New Zealand All Golds on their inaugural tour. It would be his sole rugby league state appearance for Queensland.

When the New Zealand team came back on the return leg of their tour, they played three Test matches against the first Australian representative sides ever selected. The first Test was played in Sydney on 9 May 1908 with the Kiwis prevailing. McLean played in that Test on the wing and has been allocated Kangaroo representative No. 9.

McLean was one of five former Wallabies who debuted for the Kangaroos in that inaugural Test along with Dally Messenger, Micky Dore, Denis Lutge and John Rosewell. McLean and his Queensland former rugby union colleagues Dore and Bob Tubman were all disqualified by the Queensland Rugby Union within days.

Since his two rugby league Test appearances were made as a 1908 rebel before a Brisbane club competition began in 1909, Doug McLean Sr., like George Watson was a Kangaroo with no rugby league club career.

== Rugby lineage ==
His sons Doug McLean Jr., Bill McLean, and Jack McLean were Wallabies, with Doug Jr. also one of Australia's Dual-code rugby internationals. A fourth son Bob had two sons who represented for Australian in rugby union – Jeff McLean and Paul McLean, along with their cousin Peter McLean (Bill's son). See McLean Family (rugby footballers).

== Sources ==
- The Spirit of Rugby (1995) – A collection of essays- Harper Collins, Australia
- Andrews, Malcolm (2006) The ABC of Rugby League, Austn Broadcasting Corpn, Sydney
- Whiticker, Alan & Hudson, Glen (2006) The Encyclopedia of Rugby League Players, Gavin Allen Publishing, Sydney
- Hodgson (1994) 'Australian Rugby – The Game and the Players', Jack Pollard Publishing Sydney
