= Alec Henry (rugby union) =

Albert Henry
- Born: Albert Henry

Rugby union career
- Position: centre
International career
Years	Team	Apps	(Points)
1899	Australia	1	(0)

Albert Henry was a rugby union player who represented Australia.

Henry, a centre, claimed one international rugby cap for Australia. His debut game was against Great Britain, at Brisbane, on 22 July 1899.
