= Rupert Williamson (rugby union) =

England international rugby union player

- Full name: Rupert Henry Williamson
- Born: 22 November 1886 Transvaal, South Africa
- Died: 16 March 1946 (aged 59) Sabie, Transvaal, South Africa
- School: St. Andrew's College
- University: Trinity College

Rugby union career
- Position: Scrum-half
International career
Years	Team	Apps	(Points)
1908–09	England	5	(6)

Rupert Henry Williamson (22 November 1886 – 16 March 1946) was an England rugby union international.

Williamson attended St. Andrew's College, Grahamstown, and went to Trinity College, Oxford, as a Rhodes Scholar. His halfback partner in schoolboy rugby, W. K. Flemmer, was another Rhodes Scholar, and the pair continued their association in varsity rugby, also touring together with the Barbarians. He played further club rugby for Blackheath and gained five England caps, scoring a try on debut against Wales at Bristol.

Returning to South Africa in 1909, Williamson became a mine manager at the Glynn's Lydenburg gold mine.

== See also ==
- List of England national rugby union players
