= Jeff McLean (rugby union) =

Australian rugby union international

- Full name: Jeffrey James McLean
- Born: 26 January 1947 Ipswich, QLD, Australia
- Died: 6 August 2010 (aged 63) Ipswich, QLD, Australia

Rugby union career
- Position: Wing
International career
Years	Team	Apps	(Points)
1971–74	Australia	13	(31)

Jeffrey James McLean (26 January 1947 — 6 August 2010) was an Australian rugby union international.

McLean is the grandson of dual-code international Doug McLean and elder brother of Wallabies fly-half/fullback Paul McLean. Two uncles and a cousin were also capped for the Wallabies.

Born in Ipswich, Queensland, McLean attended St Edmund's College, Ipswich and growing up primarily competed in athletics. A member of the Mayne Harriers Athletics Club, McLean specialised in sprint races, with his 10.4 second effort in the 100 metres earning him selection for the Commonwealth Games trials.

McLean, a winger, began his rugby career with Brothers Old Boys and was soon chosen to make his representative debut for Queensland. On the back of a two-try performance for Queensland against the touring Springboks in 1971, McLean made his Wallabies debut in Brisbane and gained a total of 13 caps in a three-year international career. He accumulated 85 points on the 1972 tour of New Zealand (including non-capped matches) and scored two tries against the All Blacks in Christchurch. His brother Paul made his Test debut in McLean's final Wallabies appearance in 1974.

A publican by profession, McLean died of cancer in 2010, aged 63.

== See also ==
- List of Australia national rugby union players
