= Esmond Parkinson =

Australian rugby union player (born 1886)

- Born: Charles Esmond Parkinson; 3 October 1886 Colinton, Queensland

Rugby union career
- Position: wing
International career
Years	Team	Apps	(Points)
1907	Wallabies	1	(0)

Charles Esmond Parkinson (born 3 October 1886) was a rugby union player who represented Australia. Parkinson, a wing, was born in Colinton, Queensland and claimed one international rugby cap for Australia.

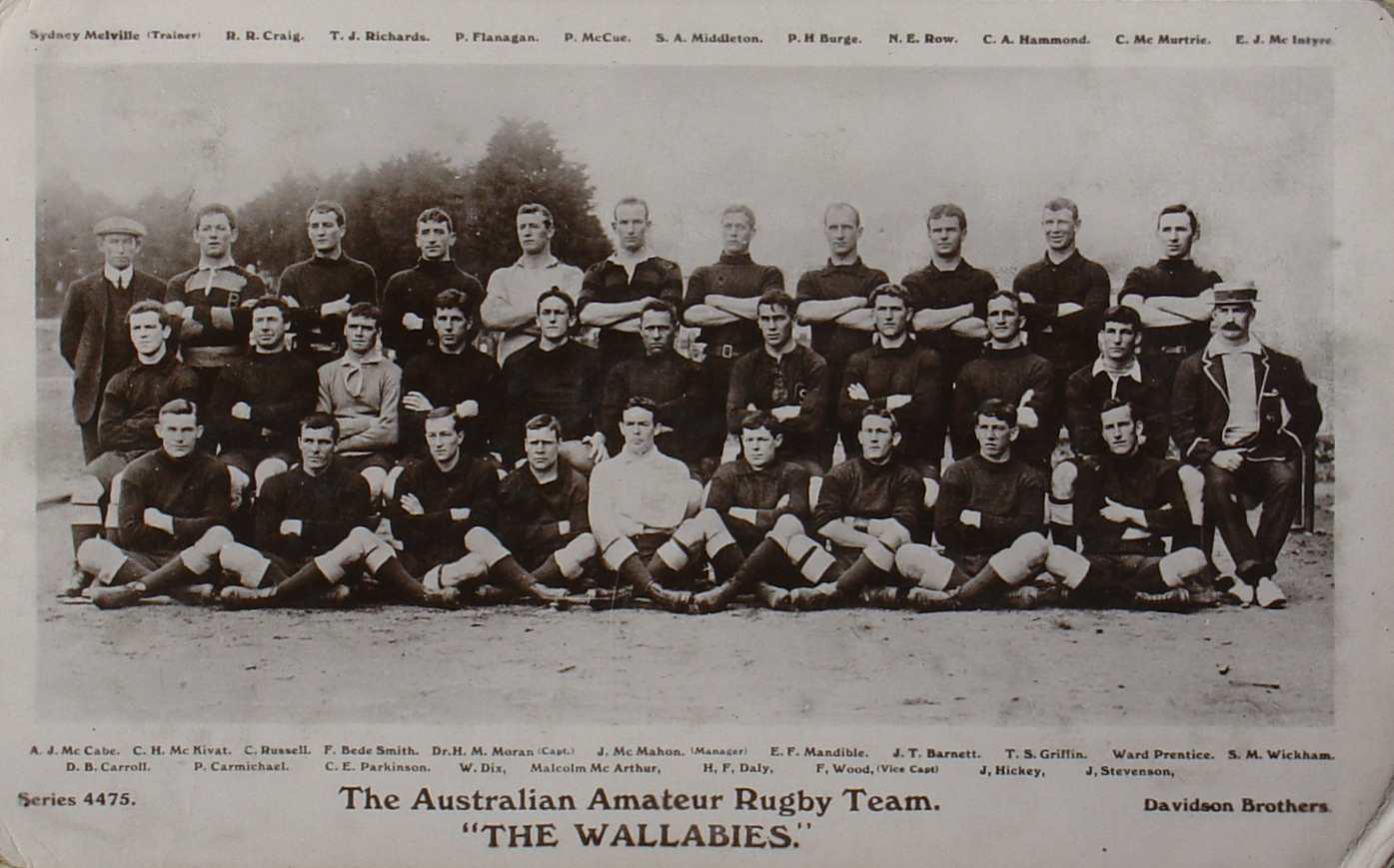
Parkinson front row 3rd from left, with the 1908 Wallaby tour squad
