= Barry Wright (rugby union) =

- Full name: Barry Arthur Wright
- Born: 12 April 1936 (age 90) Goomeri, QLD, Australia
- Height: 5 ft 10 in (178 cm)
- Weight: 12 st 9 lb (177 lb; 80 kg)
- School: Ipswich Grammar School

Rugby union career
- Position: Centre / Fly-half
Provincial / State sides
| Years | Team | Apps | (Points) |
| 1954–61 | Queensland | 16 | |
International career
| Years | Team | Apps | (Points) |
| 1955 | Australia | | |

Barry Arthur Wright (born 12 April 1936) is an Australian former international rugby union player.

Wright grew up in the rural Queensland town of Goomeri. He was boarder at Ipswich Grammar School and had three years with the 1st XV, earning GPS All Schools representative honours.

At the age of 18, Wright captained the 1954 Australian XV that toured Fiji and Tonga, becoming the youngest person to lead an Australian international rugby team. The side played unofficial Test matches against the Pacific nations.

Wright, a GPS club player, gained his solitary Wallabies call up in 1955 for a tour of New Zealand, where he featured in five uncapped matches, all as part of a winning team.

In 1956, Wright moved back to Goomeri to take up a pharmacy apprenticeship.

Returning to Brisbane rugby in 1959, Wright played three seasons with Wests, before making a switch to rugby league and joining the dominant Northern Suburbs side coached by Bob Bax.

== See also ==
- List of Australia national rugby union players
