= Herbert Moran =

Australia international rugby union player

Dr. Herbert Moran
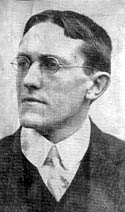
- Born: Herbert Michael Moran; 26 April 1885 Darlington, New South Wales
- Died: 20 November 1945 (aged 60) Cambridge, Cambridgeshire
- School: St Joseph's College, Hunters Hill St. Aloysius College
- University: University of Sydney; Edinburgh University

Rugby union career
- Position: flanker
Senior career
Years	Team	Apps	(Points)
1903	Rose Bay		
1905–07	Sydney Uni		
1908	Newcastle RUFC		
Provincial / State sides
Years	Team	Apps	(Points)
1906–08	New South Wales	6	
International career
Years	Team	Apps	(Points)
1908	Australia	1	

Herbert Michael "Paddy" Moran (29 April 1885 – 20 November 1945) was an Australian rugby union player, a state and national representative flanker who captained the Wallabies on their first overseas tour in 1908–09, and a medical practitioner and anti-cancer activist.

== Early years ==
Moran was born to Irish Catholic parents though his mother died in childbirth when he was five. His father had emigrated to Sydney in 1876 and laboured until he had sufficient savings to buy a bakery business in inner-city Chippendale. He struggled after his partner disappeared leaving Moran senior well in debt but found later prosperity. Young Paddy was first schooled in inner-Sydney at Darlington Superior School, then briefly at St Joseph's College, Hunters Hill before St Aloysius' Surry Hills. In his book Viewless Winds, Moran wrote that he played no more than two games of rugby football for his college in his time there.

== University & club rugby ==
He commenced his medical studies at Sydney University still aged 15 in 1901 and in 1903 started playing senior rugby with the Rose Bay club. He first turned out for the Sydney University Football Club in 1904 as a prop in second grade and from 1905 to 1907 he earned University Blues in the senior grade, captaining the club in 1907. He made state representative appearances for New South Wales in 1906 and 1907.

After completing his under-graduate studies he had a year in residence at Newcastle Hospital where he captained a Newcastle club side who toured to Sydney and beat a strong Metropolitan (Sydney) side. This again brought him to the attention of selectors and he represented again that year for the state.

== Australian representative ==
Perhaps surprisingly given his overall lack of captaincy experience Moran was selected as tour captain for Australia's first Wallabies on the 1908–09 Australia rugby union tour of Britain.

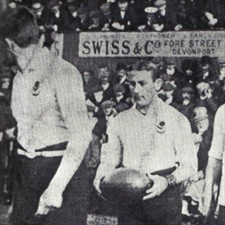
Moran leads the Wallabies out in the 1st match of the 1908 Tour at Devonport.

Howell points out that of the eight Australian players who had captained either the national, New South Wales or Queensland sides in the previous two years, two were at the end of their careers (Wickham and Richards), another two were out of form and not picked (Skeet Ahearn and Allen Oxlade), leaving four experienced captains in Wood, Burge, James Hughes and Cecil Murin. Howell suggests that the selectors may have favoured Moran with his medical degree and education above the other "more working class" candidates. In Viewless Winds however Moran speaks of a skill he possessed that may have impressed the selectors – a strategic understanding he brought to his captaincy (in terms of adapting play tactics for conditions and opposition weaknesses) which he says was not widely deployed by captains of the day.

On the long voyage Moran introduced the practice of team meetings that were part lecture and part brain-storming with players encouraged to voice their ideas on improving team performance. Moran stood at a blackboard and while his lecturing style was initially derided by the players he managed to instil a sense of cleverness and skill in players, creating thoughts of rugby as similar to a game of chess.

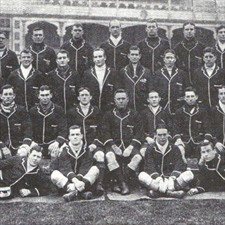
Detail from squad photo, Moran (2nd row, three from right).

Moran captained Australia in the first eight games of the tour only one of which – against Llanelli RFC – was lost. Howell writes that Moran applied himself diligently and displayed courage and leadership. He dislocated his shoulder late in the first half of the eighth tour game against London but played out the match gamely. He missed the next match against Cambridge University; the Olympic gold-medal match against Cornwall at the 1908 Summer Olympics (where Australia was captained by Chris McKivat) and the subsequent matches against Oxford University, Yorkshire and Lancashire. He played against Somerset and then made his test debut against Wales at Cardiff Arms Park on 12 December 1908 at number eight – a match lost by Australia 6–9.

He figured in the Welsh tour matches against Newport, Abertillery, Swansea and Cardiff but then disaster struck on New Year's Eve 1909 when he slipped on ice while walking and sprained his ankle. He withdrew from the team on the morning of the test against England. After the last test but with two further tour matches to be played, Moran left the tour to further his medical studies at Edinburgh University. Unfathomable by later and current standards, the tour captain therefore did not accompany the team on the next leg of the tour to the US and Canada.

All told Moran captained Australia on sixteen occasions, all on this tour – one of these was a test appearance.

In 1911 and 1912 Moran was President of Sydney's Balmain Rugby Club.

== Wallabies and war cries ==
Moran writes in Viewless Winds that when the touring squad first arrived at Plymouth a pack of journalists were there who were anxious to give the team some distinctive name.

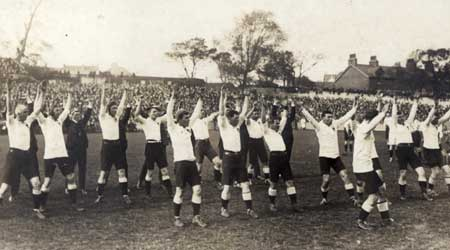
Wallabies 1908 pre-match war-cry.

The "Rabbits" was instantaneously rejected and soon after the team adopted the moniker of "The Wallabies" which for many years was used to describe the Australia national rugby union team when touring to Britain. These days the national side are the Wallabies whether playing at home or anywhere abroad.

Moran also describes as "an affliction" the war-cry which the parent Union in Australia had suggested the team should use for its "box-office value". Moran wrote "The memory of that war cry provokes anger in me even after all these years.... We were expected to leap up in the air and make foolish gestures which somebody thought Australian natives might have used in similar circumstances and we were give meaningless words which we were to utter savagely during the pantomime.... I refused to lead the wretched caricature of a native corroboree and regularly hid myself among the team, a conscientious objector."

== War service and medical career ==
He volunteered his services in England at the beginning of World War I and was made a Lieutenant in the Royal Army Medical Corps. He was appointed Surgeon Specialist on a hospital ship and sent to the Aegean, where he tended to soldiers wounded at the Landing at Suvla Bay. He contracted amoebic dysentery, was sent to Mesopotamia where he became ill again. He was repatriated to Australia via India.

Moran didn't mince words when he wrote home to Australian newspapers from the WWI front:

You must all come over if you want to win this war — ‘every man Jack’ of you. It is fighting all-in now, and the slacker and the shirker merit only a noose of rope. It is the only game worth playing at present, and they are in our twenty-five. We want all the young men, and the old men, too, to put it in with vigour. Send us men, men, men, and more men. It is the best game in history. There are no rules, and the only referee — posterity — has a whistle that cannot be heard. Yes, they’re in our twenty-five at present, but when we heel out our ammunition more cleanly we shall move forward. Meanwhile we want men — men with fierce, relentless eyes, and men with ruthless hands; men of the Anzac breed. There is no let-up and no begging pardon. If we lose we are out of the competition forever, and when we win we shall despise those who looked over the fence when our line was in danger.

— Letter to Australian newspapers, November 1915

As an author Paddy Moran published three books: Viewless Winds – the recollections and digressions of an Australian surgeon (London, P Davies 1939); Beyond the hill lies China – scenes from a medical life in Australia (London, P Davies 1945); In my fashion – an autobiography of the last ten years (Sydney, Dymocks 1946). His criticisms of Australian Catholic Church leaders such as Archbishop Mannix were forceful and offended some.

After the end of World War I he became interested in cancer and went to Paris to study the use of radium. He did further research in the United States and was the first in his profession to use radium needles or radium tubes in the treatment of cancer in Australia. In France in 1926 he did work at the Cancer Clinic of Villejuif. He retired from medical practice in 1935 aged 50 and spent time roaming through Europe. He spent some considerable time in Italy, became proficient in Italian and had four audiences with Benito Mussolini. After the Italian invasion of Abyssinia, he went there as a freelance doctor in 1936. He subsequently spent a year in Germany learning the language before World War II broke out.

Again at the beginning of World War II he went to England to volunteer his services in the British Forces. He served again with the Royal Army Medical Corps and was appointed President of Medical Boards based in Colchester in England. He was diagnosed with cancer in February 1945 and released from the Army on 14 April 1945. He died in November 1945 at a nursing home in Cambridge. The 1947–48 Wallabies visited his grave.

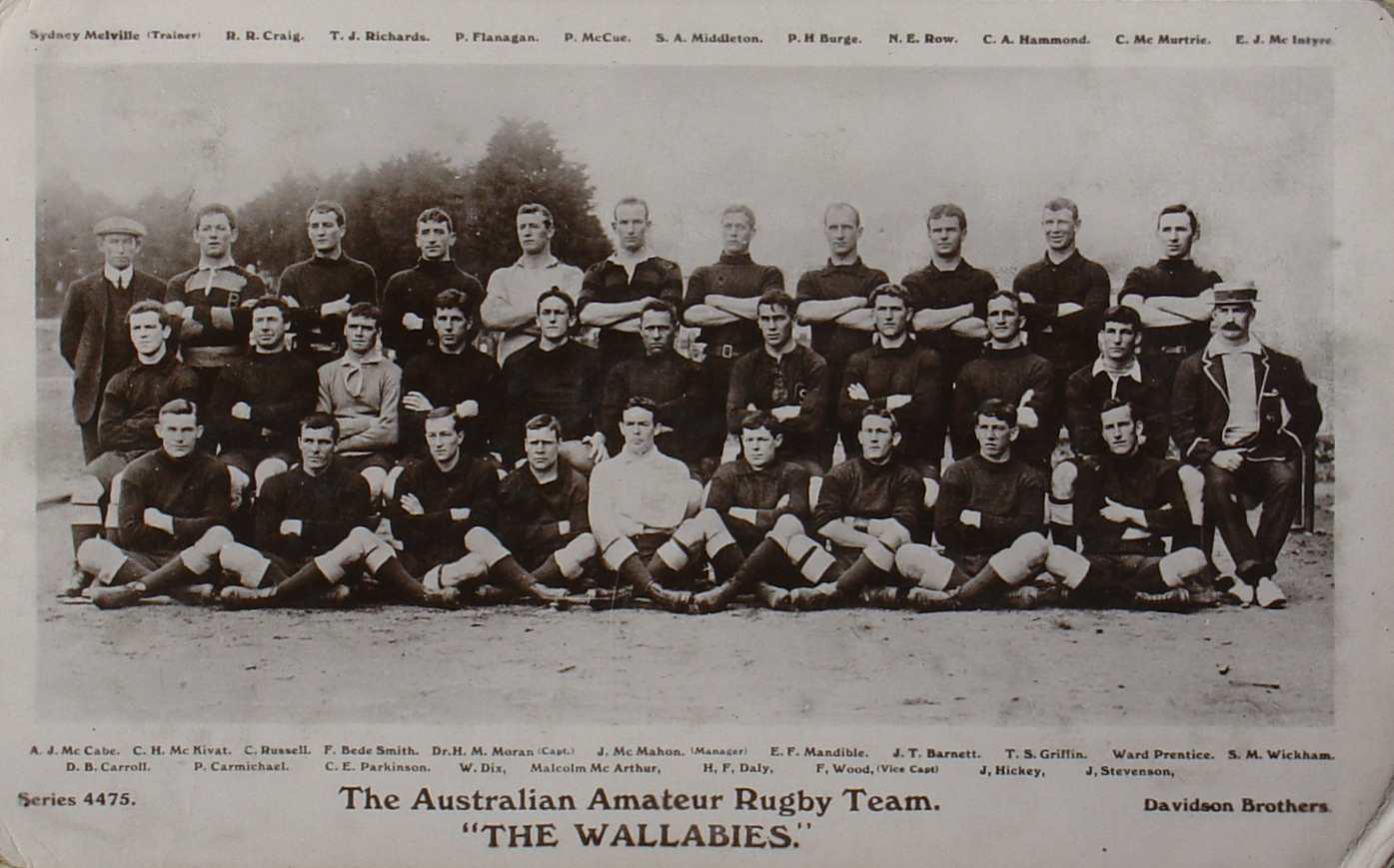
Moran middle row 5th from left, with the 1908 Wallaby tour squad

His son P. A. P. ("Pat") Moran became a distinguished statistician.

== Accolades ==
In 2011 he was honoured in the seventh set of inductees into the Australian Rugby Union Hall of Fame.

Preceded by Allen Oxlade	Australian national rugby union captain 1908	Succeeded by Chris McKivat
