= McLean family =

Australian rugby league & union family

The McLean family were an Australian rugby clan who between them played 77 Tests for the Australian national rugby union team and a number of Tests for the Australian national rugby league team.

The main grandstand at Ballymore, the home of the Queensland Rugby Union, is named the McLean Stand in honour of the family's contribution to Queensland rugby and Australian rugby.

== Doug McLean Sr. ==
Douglas James McLean (1880–1947) was the patriarch. He was a pioneer Australian representative rugby union and rugby league player, a dual code international. He represented with the Wallabies in 3 Tests and as a Kangaroo in 2 Tests.

Doug had three sons (Doug Jr., Bill, and Jack) who also played for Australia. Three of his grandsons did as well.

== Doug McLean Jr. ==
Alexander Douglas McLean (1912–1961), was educated at St Laurence's College, South Brisbane. He played 10 Tests for the Wallabies between 1933 and 1936. He too was a dual code international, playing two Kangaroo Tests on the wing and making the 1937 Kangaroo tour of Great Britain.

== Bill McLean ==
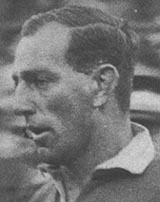
Bill McLean

William Malcolm McLean (1918–1996) played 5 Tests as captain of the Wallabies immediately after World War II.

Born in Ipswich and educated at both Brisbane State High School and St. Laurence's College, McLean played his club rugby with GPS Old Boys.

He was selected to lead the national side to tour 1947–48 Australia rugby union tour of Britain, Ireland, France and North America. He badly broke a leg early in the tour and did not play in any further Tests. As a captain in 2/3rd Commando Squadron (Australia) he saw action against the Japanese in World War II.

== Jack McLean ==
Jack McLean was a member of the 1946 Wallaby team that toured New Zealand though he didn't make the Test XV.

== Bob McLean ==
A fourth son of Doug McLean Sr was Bob McLean. He had two sons who won Test caps: Jeff and Paul.

== Jeff McLean ==
Jeffrey James McLean (26 January 1948 – 6 August 2010) played 13 times for the Wallabies between 1971 and 1974 on the wing. He debuted in 1971 against the Springboks. His final Wallaby appearance in the 1st Test of 1974 against the All Blacks was also the representative debut of his younger brother Paul. He died in 2010, aged 62, from cancer.

== Paul McLean ==
Paul Edward McLean born 12 Oct 1953 at Ipswich, Queensland was the most feted and successful footballer of the family. Paul was capped 31 times between 1974 and 1982, scoring 263 points for the Wallabies playing at fly-half, fullback or centre. He made his Wallaby debut in the first Test of 1974 against the All Blacks.

Paul McLean was President of the Australian Rugby Union between 2005 and 2009.

== Peter McLean ==
Bill's son Peter William McLean born 8 February 1954 in Brisbane, Queensland also represented at lock for the Wallabies. Peter attended Brisbane State High School where he started to play rugby in the U13s. He then moved to Gatton Agricultural College to play in U18s and U19s, and from there was selected for the Brisbane U18 and U19 representative sides.

He made 16 Test appearances between 1978 and 1982, playing 11 times alongside his cousin Paul. His Wallaby debut was in the first Test of 1978 against the All Blacks.

== See also ==
- List of international rugby union families

== Sources ==
- The Spirit of Rugby 1995 (Collection of Essays), HarperCollins: Australia
