= 2023 Shute Shield season =

Rugby union competition in New South Wales

- Number of teams: 12
- Champions: Randwick (29th Premiership)
- Runners-up: Northern Suburbs
- Matches played: 117
- Top point scorer: Reece Suesue (121)
- Top try scorer: Andrew Tuala (16)

Official website
- shuteshield.rugby

The 2023 Shute Shield season, also known as the Charter Hall Shute Shield, (Note: For naming rights.) or the NSWRU Shute Shield, was the 149th season of the semi-professional premier-grade rugby union club competition in the Australian state of New South Wales. With all but one club playing inside the Sydney area, the competition held the same number of teams from the previous season, twelve, following difficulties due to the COVID-19 pandemic and the axing of Western Sydney club, Penrith Emus.

The regular season began on 1 April and concluded following eighteen rounds, with one bye round, on 5 August. A six team finals series kicked-off following round eighteen. The Grand Final was played on August 26, with Randwick defeating the Northern Suburbs 17–15. The defending champions were Sydney University.

== Stadia and personnel ==
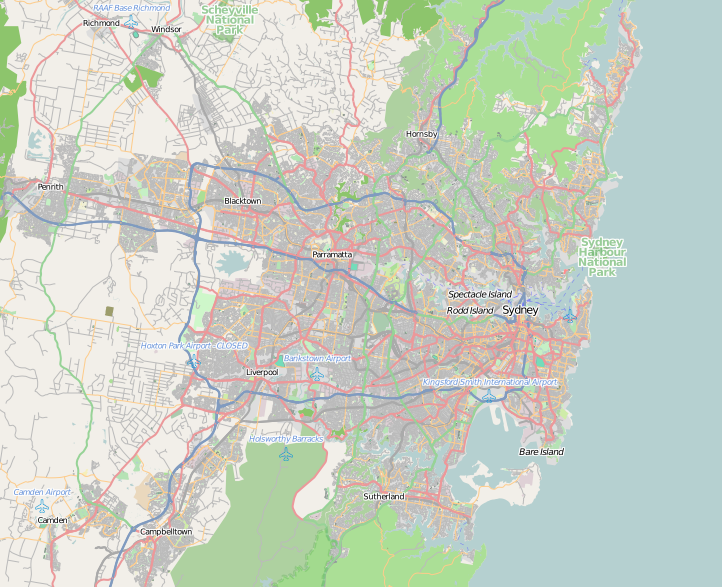
Shute Shield team stadia, 2023 (Sydney)

Club	Colour	Jersey	Stadium/Base	Coach
Eastern Suburbs			Woollahra Oval, Rose Bay	Simon Kneebone
Eastwood			TG Millner Field, Marsfield	Ben Batger
Gordon			Chatswood Oval, Chatswood	Brian Melrose
Hunter Wildfires			Newcastle No.2 Sportsground, Newcastle West	Scott Coleman
Manly			Manly Oval, Manly	Phil Blake
Northern Suburbs			North Sydney Oval, North Sydney	Zak Beer
Randwick			Coogee Oval, Coogee	Stephen Hoiles
Southern Districts			Forshaw Park, Sylvania Waters	Jayson Brewer
Sydney University			Sydney University Football Ground (No.2 Oval), Camperdown	Damien Hill
Warringah			Pittwater Park, Warriewood	Mike Ruthven
West Harbour			Concord Oval, Concord	Cameron Treloar
Western Sydney Two Blues			Granville Park, Merrylands	Sailosi Tagicakibau

== Matches ==
Home \ Away	E'Sub	E'Wood	Gordon	Hunter	Manly	Norths	R'Wick	Souths	Uni	WAR	W. Harbour	Two Blues
Eastern Suburbs	—	30–24			29–28	12–48	22–36	38–19	47–35	35–43	27–20	21–36
Eastwood		—	28–27	50–28	40–44	29–34		30–16	19–38	66–41	31–18	24–22
Gordon	40–15	45–28	—	22–21	5–46	19–30			36–7	49–29	39–38	12–23
Hunter Wildfires	31–10		28–44	—	27–19	29–5	31–24	19–26	21–36	31–27	34–21	
Manly	31–28	24–27		17–18	—	29–24	14–14	45–24		43–26	17–17	26–19
Northern Suburbs	24–15	36–46	23–17	43–28		—	15–27	35–24	25–22	27–21		27–19
Randwick	43–24	26–34	35–21		34–27	23–28	—	63–20	44–33	49–0		36–29
Southern Districts	17–26	22–50	16–7	24–21			15–38	—	28–45	21–17	12–31	25–42
Sydney University	38–36	26–29	28–41	29–26	21–17	20–37	21–14		—		21–17	31–38
Warringah	15–13		26–31	20–52	14–38	21–49	15–22	42–32	13–15	—	29–24	
West Harbour	31–27	34–31	17–22	26–31	16–14	21–29	19–22	44–16			—	17–15
Western Sydney Two Blues		60–28	18–26	32–33	22–36		22–24	28–18	33–17	38–24	40–26	—

First match(es) will be played: 5 August 2023. Source: Shute Shield
Legend: Blue = home team win; Yellow = draw; Red = away team win.

== Ladder ==
Pos	Team	Pld	W	D	L	PF	PA	PD	BP	Pts	Qualification
1	Northern Suburbs	18	14	0	4	539	422	+117	11	67	Advance to Qualifying finals
2	Randwick (C)	18	13	1	4	574	390	+184	13	67	Advance to Qualifying finals
3	Eastwood	18	11	0	7	614	571	+43	18	62	Advance to Qualifying finals
4	Manly	18	9	2	7	515	405	+110	17	57	Advance to Qualifying finals
5	Gordon	18	11	0	7	503	456	+47	12	56	Advance to Qualifying finals
6	Hunter Wildfires	18	10	0	8	509	475	+34	16	56	Advance to Qualifying finals
7	Western Sydney Two Blues	18	9	0	9	536	451	+85	18	54	
8	Sydney University	18	9	0	9	483	521	−38	13	49	
9	West Harbour	18	6	1	11	437	457	−20	14	40	
10	Eastern Suburbs	18	6	0	12	455	559	−104	13	37	
11	Warringah	18	4	0	14	423	635	−212	15	31	
12	Southern Districts	18	4	0	14	375	621	−246	4	20	

Source: Shute Shield
(C) Champions

== Finals series ==
=== Bracket ===
Qualifying Finals
2	Randwick	32
5	Gordon	23
3	Eastwood	54
4	Manly	20
1	Northern Suburbs	23
6	Hunter Wildfires	17

Preliminary Finals
W1	Randwick	38
L1	Eastwood	20
W2	Manly	5
W3	Northern Suburbs	23

Grand Final
Randwick	17
Northern Suburbs	15
