= Greater Sydney Rams =

Defunct Australian rugby union club, based in Sydney, NSW

(Australia) Greater Sydney Rams
- PCS Greater Sydney Rams
- Founded: 2007 (as Western Sydney Rams)
- Disbanded: 2018; 8 years ago pre-season
- Location: Sydney, Australia
- Ground: TG Millner Field
- League(s): NRC, ARC

The Greater Sydney Rams, originally known as the Western Sydney Rams, is a former rugby union team from Australia that was disbanded in 2018. The Rams won the minor premiership in the 2007 Australian Rugby Championship (ARC), and then competed in the National Rugby Championship (NRC) from 2014 to 2017.

The Greater Sydney Rams team in the NRC took its identity from the Rams side that was founded in 2007. Australia's national competition was discontinued following the first season in 2007 but, after an absence of six years, the ARC was relaunched as the NRC in 2014.

The revived Rams team for 2014 was backed by a syndicate of private investors in partnership with four Sydney rugby clubs; Parramatta, Penrith, Southern Districts and West Harbour. The Eastwood club was initially included in the partnership but withdrew prior to the 2014 season.

In 2017 the Rams were taken over by the Eastwood Rugby Union Club, for what was to be their last season in the competition. A restructure for the 2018 season removed the Rams from the NRC, leaving only two sides from New South Wales in the competition; the Rays and the Eagles.

== Name and colours ==
The inspiration for the name Rams derived from the pioneering past of Western Sydney; and as recognition of the settlers that started the Australian sheep and wool industries in Parramatta. The original orange and blue colours of the Rams were unveiled at the ARC team's launch in March 2007. White was added to the collar of the jersey and base of the sleeves in 2014, and a predominantly white and blue kit with orange highlights was introduced when Eastwood took ownership of the team for the 2017 season.

== History ==
In 2007, an attempt was made to form a third tier of rugby in Australia, similar to New Zealand's ITM Cup and South Africa's Currie Cup. The new competition, called the Australian Rugby Championship, included eight teams. Three of those teams were based in New South Wales, including a Western Sydney team based at Parramatta.

2007 Rams logo.

=== ARC: Western Sydney Rams 2007 ===
The clubs aligned with the Western Sydney Rams in 2007 were Eastwood, West Harbour, Parramatta and Penrith. All competed in the Tooheys New Cup and Shute Shield club competitions. The Rams' local rivals in the ARC were the Sydney Fleet and the Central Coast Rays. The three ARC teams from New South Wales were aligned with existing clubs and regions.

Brian Melrose was the head coach of the Rams in 2007. Melrose had coaching roles with Manly and the Australian Sevens team and was previously an assistant coach to the Waratahs. He played for Parramatta, West Harbour and Eastwood before taking up coaching.

The Western Sydney Rams played at Parramatta Stadium, which then had an all-seater capacity of 20,000. The Rams were the minor premiers of the 2007 ARC season. The team was knocked out of the 2007 finals by the Melbourne Rebels at the semi-final stage.

The Australian Rugby Championship was terminated at the end of 2007 after only one season of competition, with the Australian Rugby Union citing higher costs than budgeted and further projected financial losses. The Western Sydney Rams team was disbanded with the end of the ARC competition.

=== Greater Sydney Rams 2014–2015 ===

2014-2015 Greater Sydney Rams kit and logo.

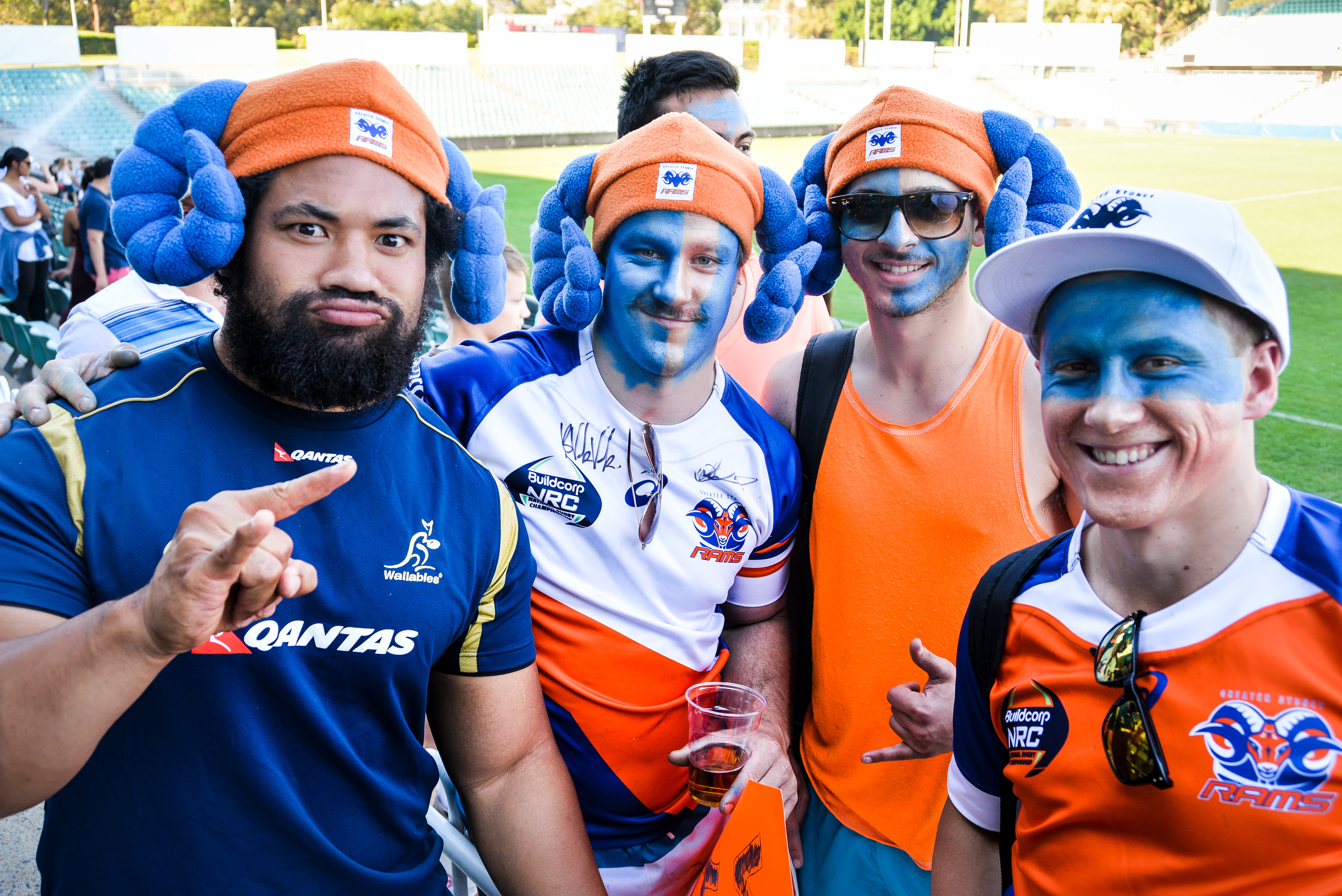
Tatafu Polota-Nau with Greater Sydney 'Horned Army' Fans in 2014.

The National Rugby Championship was announced in December 2013 to commence in 2014 with expressions of interest open to any interested parties with accepted bids to be announced early 2014.

In March 2014 it was announced that the Rams would be revived as the Greater Sydney Rams to compete in the new National Rugby Championship, and the team's original colours from the ARC would be maintained.

The new Rams team, representing Greater Sydney, was formed by Greater Sydney Rams Pty Ltd – a syndicate of private investors in partnership with (initially) five Shute Shield clubs: Eastwood, Parramatta, Penrith, Southern Districts, and West Harbour. In late June 2014, Eastwood withdrew financial backing from the Rams, and ended their formal association with the team. The Rams' shareholdings were split, with three quarters being held by the syndicate of investors and the remainder held by the clubs (5% being kept aside for Eastwood should they wish to become a partner).

A law firm, People + Culture Strategies (PCS), was announced as the Rams' naming rights partner for the 2014 to 2016 seasons.

The Rams appointed Brian Melrose as head coach for the 2014 season, renewing their association with the coach that took the Western Sydney Rams to the minor premiership in 2007. For the first NRC match of 2014 the Rams named 21-year-old Jed Holloway, from the Southern Districts club, as captain of the team. In 2015, former Wallaby assistant coach Jim Williams was appointed Rams coach.

2016 Rams logo.

=== Western Sydney Rams: 2016 ===
The franchise reverted to its original name of Western Sydney Rams for the 2016 NRC season. Consideration was given to the Southern Districts Rugby Club switching to the newly renamed Sydney Rays, but the club decided to remain a shareholder of the Rams. Former Australian assistant coach John Muggleton was named as the Rams' new head coach for the 2016 season, with Jeremy Paul and Joel Wilson appointed as assistant coaches.

The team played their home matches out of Concord Oval but only won two matches for the year, finishing the regular season in sixth place and did not make the semifinal stage of the competition.

=== Greater Sydney Rams: 2017 ===
The Rams franchise underwent a restructure in 2017, reverting to the Greater Sydney Rams name again when Eastwood Rugby Club took over control of the licence. The team's home ground was moved to TG Millner Field.

Before the start of the 2018 season, an announcement from NSW Rugby on 6 June 2018 stated that only two teams from New South Wales would be included in the NRC for that year. Reverting to one team each from the city and country meant that the Rams were removed from the competition.

== Sponsorship ==
The Rams naming rights sponsor in 2014 was the workplace relations law firm, People + Culture Strategies (PCS). Other partners in the 2014 season included financial advice firm Evalesco Financial Services, owned by Jeff Thurecht and Marshall Brentnall, ARC Group, owned by Cameron Ryan and Pacific Restaurants, chaired by businessman Rick Hutchinson, and the University of Western Sydney.

In the 2015 and 2016 seasons the RAMS were sponsored by People + Culture Strategies, ARC Group, Evalesco Financial Services and The Digital Athlete. In the 2017 season the RAMS were sponsored by People + Culture Strategies and major international property investment company Brookfield

== Stadium ==
Previous Rams home grounds
Venue	Location	Capacity
Concord Oval	Inner West	20,000
Forshaw Park	Sutherland Shire	2,000
Granville Park	Merrylands	5,000
Parramatta Stadium	Parramatta	20,700
TG Millner Field	Marsfield	8,000

The Rams initially played at Parramatta Stadium in 2014, home of the National Rugby League club, the Parramatta Eels, and A-league team Western Sydney Wanderers. The site was originally known as Cumberland Oval and rugby union was played there from 1879 through to 1939. The old wooden grandstand was burnt down in the early 1980s and Cumberland Oval was redeveloped into Parramatta Stadium which opened in 1986.

In 2015, the Rams consortium clubs of Parramatta and Southern Districts also hosted home matches. In 2016, the Rams played out of Concord Oval, which hosted eight matches during the 1987 Rugby World Cup, including a semifinal. The Rams played all their home games for 2017 at TG Millner Field, the home ground of Eastwood Rugby Club in the Shute Shield competition.

== Records ==
=== Honours ===
- Playoff appearances: 2007 (ARC)

=== Season standings ===
National Rugby Championship

Year	Pos	Pld	W	D	L	F	A	+/-	BP	Pts	Play-offs
2017	**7th**	8	3	0	5	248	319	–71	1	**13**	Did not compete
2016	**6th**	7	2	0	5	264	266	−2	5	**13**	Did not compete
2015	**9th**	8	1	0	7	242	363	−121	3	**7**	Did not compete
2014	**5th**	8	3	1	4	254	265	−11	2	**16**	Did not compete

Australian Rugby Championship

Year	Pos	Pld	W	D	L	F	A	+/-	BP	Pts	Play-offs
2007	**1st**	8	5	0	3	239	149	+90	7	**27**	Semi-final loss to the Melbourne Rebels by 23–3.

=== Head coaches ===
- John Manenti (2017)
- John Muggleton (2016)
- Jim Williams (2015)
- Brian Melrose (2007, 2014)

=== Captains ===
- Jed Holloway (2017)
- Paul Asquith (2016)
- Jed Holloway (2014–15)
- Lachie Turner (2007)

=== Squads ===
2017 Greater Sydney Rams squad – NRC
The squad for the 2017 National Rugby Championship season:
**Props**: Duncan Chubb; Jed Gillespie; **Sekope Kepu**^{1}; Robert Lagudi; Andrew Tuala; **Hookers**: **Nathan Charles**; Gunnz Fuavao; Hugh Roach; **Locks**: Adrian Hall; Fergus Lee-Warner; Joshua Redfern; Sam Thomson; Albert Tuisue	**Loose forwards**: Kotoni Ale; Jed Holloway; David Hickey; Kelly Peniata Meafua; **Scrum-halves**: Matt Gonzalez; Josh Holmes; **Nick Phipps**^{1}; **Fly-halves**: **Jai Ayoub**; Kodie Hawkins; Stu Dunbar; Mack Mason	**Centres**: **Kurtley Beale**^{1}; Ben Cotton; Kevin Fuavao; Tevita Piukana; Dennis Pili-Gaitau; **Wingers**: Cam Bailey; John Grant; **Taqele Naiyaravoro**; **Fullbacks**: **Israel Folau**^{1}; Liam Windon; (c) Team captain **Bold** denotes internationally capped players at the time^{1} Allocated national player additional to contracted squad.

2016 Western Sydney Rams squad – NRC
The squad for the 2016 National Rugby Championship season:
**Props**: **Mesake Doge**; Matt Gibbon; Vunipola Fifita; David Lolohea; Jack Payne; Andrew Tuala; **Hookers**: Aaron Blacklock; Brandon Paenga-Amosa; Hugh Roach; **Locks**: Ngaruhe Jones; Bradford Kapa; Senio Toleafoa; **Will Skelton**; Albert Tuisue	**Loose forwards**: Tom Alexander; Taunaola Kei; Jordan Tuapou; Filimone Tufui; Tyrone Viiga; **Scrum-halves**: Scott Gale; Harrison Goddard; Waldo Wessels; **Fly-halves**: Mitchell Walton; Vatemo Ravouvou	**Centres**: Paul Asquith (c); Robaleibau Buaserau; Denny Godinet; David Minute; Apolosi Latunipulu; **Wingers**: Fabian Goodall; Selestino Kalounivale; Luke Smart; **Fullbacks**: **Albert Nikoro**; Cyril Reece; (c) Team captain **Bold** denotes internationally capped players at the time^{1} Allocated national player additional to contracted squad.

2015 Greater Sydney Rams squad – NRC
The squad for the 2015 National Rugby Championship season:
**Props**: Cameron Betham; Matt Gibbon; Jed Gillespie; Samuel Needs; Cameron Orr; **Benn Robinson**^{1}; **Hookers**: **Tatafu Polota-Nau**^{1}; Siliva Siliva; Hugh Roach; **Locks**: **Evan Olmstead**; Filimore Tufui	**Loose forwards**: Marcus Carbone; Jonathan Hayes; Jed Holloway (c); Cohen Masson; Kelly Meafua; **Scrum-halves**: Kaleb Rech; De Wet Roos; **Fly-halves**: **Jai Ayoub**; **Kurtley Beale**^{1}; Rohan Saifoloi	**Centres**: Paul Asquith; Denny Godinet; Michael McDougall; Jordan Heyer; Henry Seavula; Henry Taufua; **Wingers**: Brad Curtis; **Rob Horne**^{1}; Afa Pakalani; **Fullbacks**: Brenden Hartmann; (c) Team captain **Bold** denotes internationally capped players at the time^{1} Allocated national player additional to contracted squad.

2014 Greater Sydney Rams squad – NRC
The squad for the 2014 National Rugby Championship season:
**Props**: **Ben Alexander**^{1}; Rhys Brodie; Jed Gillespie; Dave Lolohea; Guy Millar; **Benn Robinson**; **Hookers**: Maile Ngauamo; **Tatafu Polota-Nau**^{1}; **Peni Ravai**; Hugh Roach; **Locks**: Jared Barry; Andrew Clyne; Jed Holloway (c); Dylan Sigg; Senio Toleafoa	**Loose forwards**: Chris Alcock; Marcus Carbone; Michael Kovacic; Sakaria Noa; Hugh Perrett; Patrick Sio; **Scrum-halves**: Auvasa Faleali'i; Mark Swanepoel; **Fly-halves**: **Jai Ayoub**; Kurtley Beale^{1}; Ben Volavola	**Centres**: Lalakai Foketi; Tom Hill; **Tevita Kuridrani**^{1}; Apolosi Latunipulu; Michael McDougall; Henry Seavula; Henry Taufua; **Wingers**: Dane Chisholm; **Rob Horne**^{1}; Taqele Naiyaravoro; **Fullbacks**: Ben Batger; Jerome McKenzie; (c) Team captain **Bold** denotes internationally capped players at the time^{1} Allocated national player additional to contracted squad.

2007 Western Sydney Rams squad – ARC
**Props**: Ben Alexander; Aaron Broughton-Rouse; James Lakepa; Peter Niumata; **Benn Robinson**; **Hookers**: Josh Mann-Rea; **Tatafu Polota-Nau**; Ben Roberts; **Locks**: Ben Hand (c); Van Humphries; Marty Wilson; Sam Wykes	**Loose forwards**: Wil Brame; Ben Coridas; Mark Howell; Gareth Palamo; Hugh Perrett; Tom Egan; **Scrum-halves**: Josh Holmes; Dave Rimmer; **Fly-halves**: Kurtley Beale; Josh Weeks; Fa'atonu Fili	**Centres**: Rory Sidey; Luke Johnson; Chris Siale; **Wings**: Filipo Toala; Lachlan Mitchell; **Fullbacks**: Ben Martin; Lachie Turner (c); (c) Team captain **Bold** denotes internationally capped players at the time

== Gallery ==
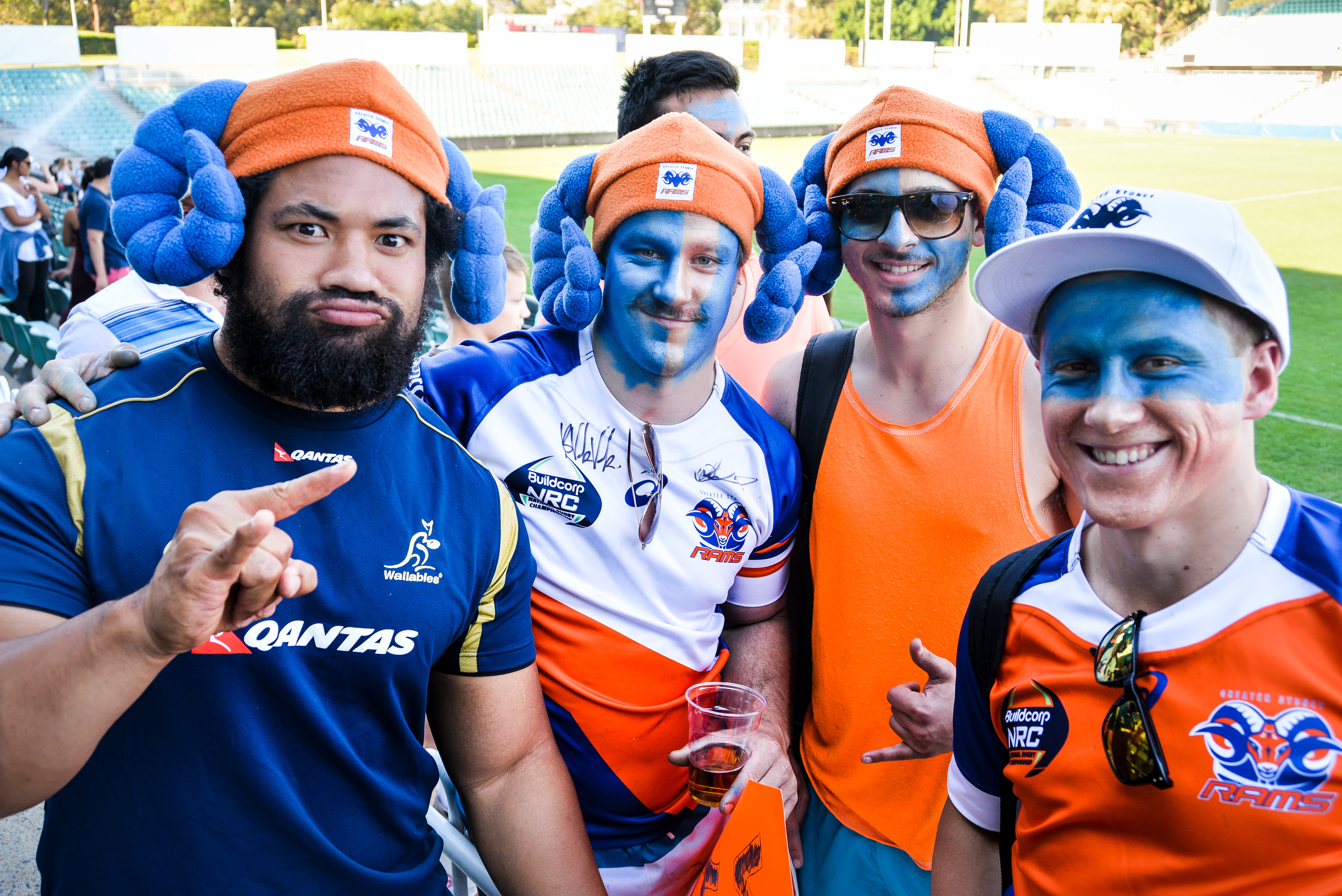
Tatafu Polota-Nau with Greater Sydney 'Horned Army' Fans

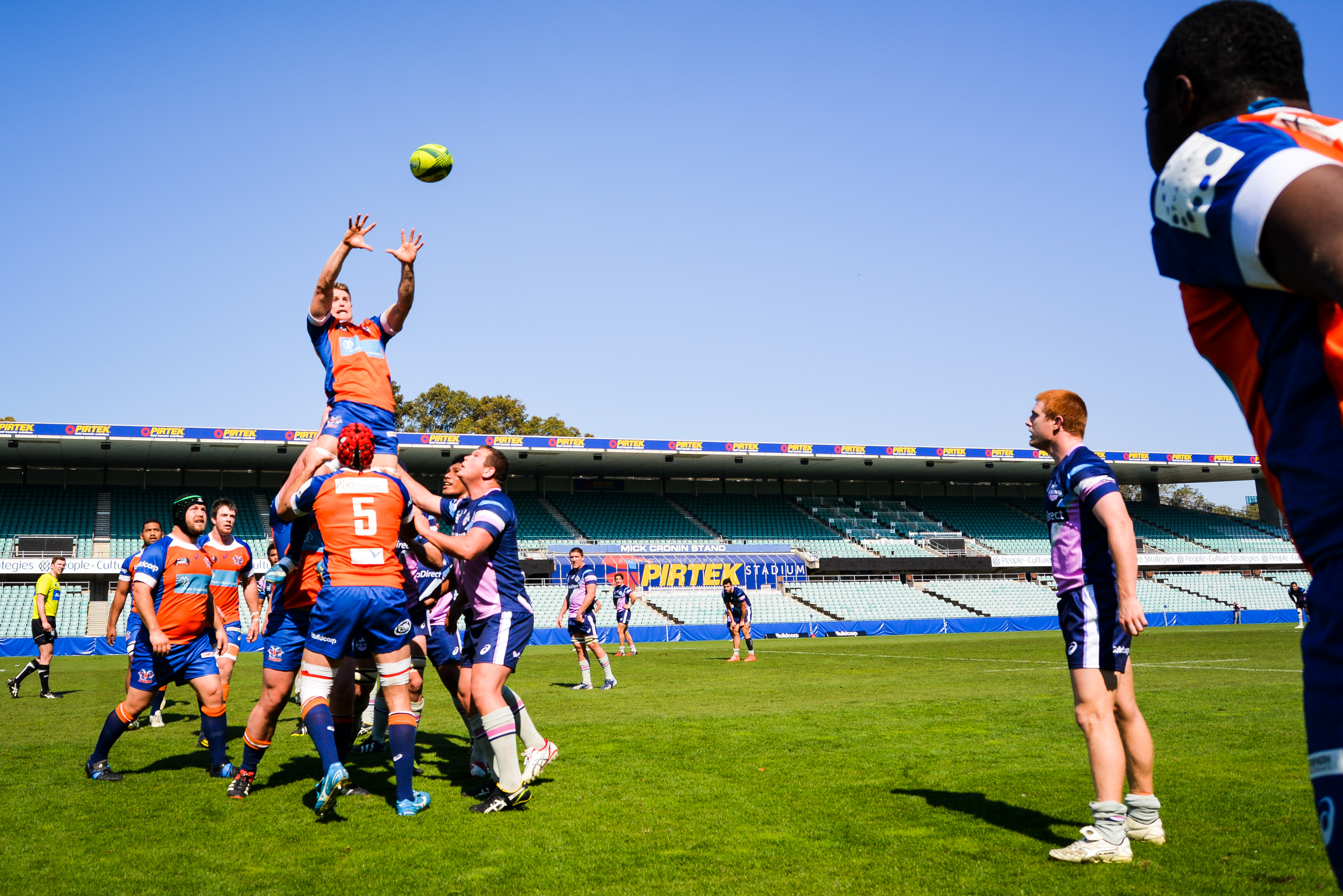
Rams win a lineout against Melbourne

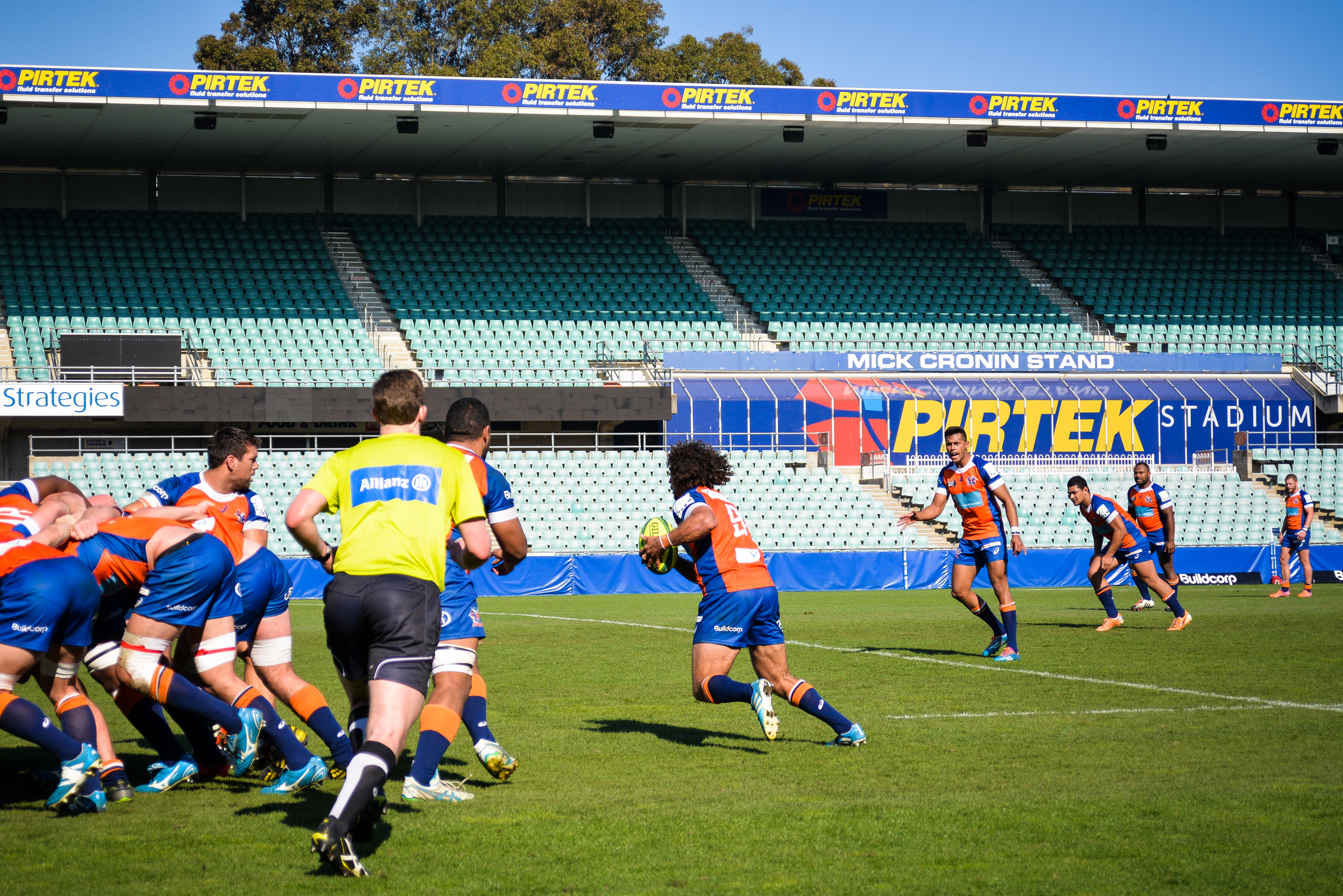
Rams backline in action for Round 8

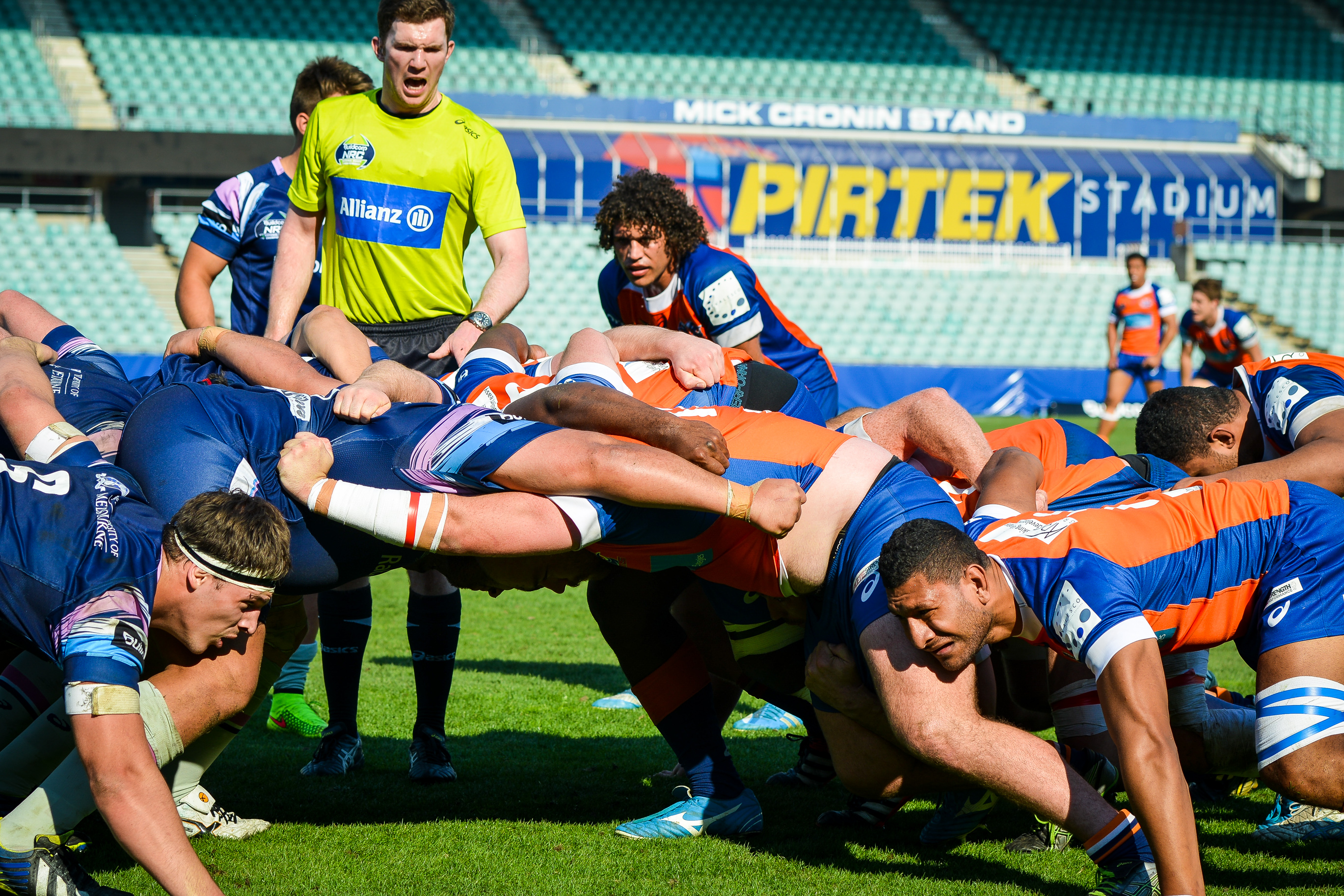
Rams forwards in action against Melbourne

== See also ==
- New South Wales Rugby Union (NSWRU)
- New South Wales Waratahs
- Shute Shield
