= 2009 Shute Shield season =

- Number of teams: 12
- Champions: (22ndth title)

The first matches of the season were played on 28 March 2009 with the season ending in the Grand Final on 26 September 2009.

== Teams ==
Twelve teams competed in the 2009 Shute Shield season from Sydney.

Team	Home ground
Eastern Suburbs	Woollahra Oval
Eastwood	TG Millner Field
Gordon	Chatswood Oval
Manly	Manly Oval
Northern Suburbs	North Sydney Oval; Bon Andrews Oval
Parramatta^{z}	Granville Oval
Penrith^{z}	Nepean Rugby Park; St Marys League Stadium
Randwick	Coogee Oval
Southern Districts	Forshaw Rugby Park
Sydney University	Sydney University Oval
Warringah	Pittwater Rugby Park
West Harbour	Concord Oval

^{z} Does not field a team in the 1st Grade Colts competition

== Ladders ==
=== Seniors ===
==== First Grade (Shute Shield) ====
2009 Shute Shield Table
Pos	Team	Pld	W	D	L	PF	PA	PD	BP	Pts
1	Sydney University	22	19	0	3	821	368	+453	12	88
2	Randwick	22	17	0	5	768	424	+344	12	80
3	Gordon	22	14	0	8	753	442	+311	15	71
4	Manly	22	14	0	8	538	390	+148	13	69
5	Eastwood	22	12	1	9	718	490	+228	18	68
6	Warringah	22	12	2	8	653	449	+204	15	67
7	Eastern Suburbs	22	13	0	9	647	402	+245	14	66
8	West Harbour	22	10	0	12	572	605	−33	16	56
9	Southern Districts	22	7	1	14	485	676	−191	11	41
10	Northern Suburbs	22	8	0	14	489	724	−235	6	38
11	Parramatta	22	2	0	20	297	1020	−723	7	15
12	Penrith	22	2	0	20	307	1058	−751	5	13

===== Finals =====
====== Finals Rd1 ======
Finals Rd1 match 1

12 September
3:00pm

Gordon	27–10	Warringah

Pittwater Rugby Park

Finals Rd1 match 2

13 September
3:00pm

Manly	21–32	Eastwood

Forshaw Rugby Park

====== Semi-finals ======
Semi-final 1

19 September
3:00pm

Sydney University	37–13	Eastwood

Concord Oval

Semi-final 2

20 September
3:00pm

Randwick	53–32	Gordon

Woollahra Oval

====== Final ======
26 September 2009
3:00pm

Sydney University	24–19	Randwick

Sydney Football Stadium

==== Second Grade (Colin Caird Shield) ====
2009 Colin Caird Shield Table
	Team	Pld	W	D	L	PF	PA	PD	BP	Pts
1	Sydney University	12	11	0	1	545	141	385	11	55
2	Gordon	13	10	0	3	454	191	283	10	49
3	Randwick	13	9	0	4	473	253	220	12	48
4	Manly	13	10	0	3	366	193	174	7	47
5	Eastern Suburbs	13	9	0	4	467	227	240	10	46
6	Eastwood	13	7	0	6	297	265	32	5	34
7	Southern Districts	13	6	0	7	242	261	-19	4	28
8	West Harbour	13	4	0	9	393	333	60	11	27
9	Northern Suburbs	12	5	0	7	201	257	-31	2	22
10	Warringah	12	3	0	9	305	364	-59	4	16
11	Penrith	12	2	0	10	212	505	-293	6	14
12	Parramatta	13	0	0	13	72	1056	-984	0	0

  - RD12 Sydney University V Penrith postponed
    Rd 12 Northern Suburbs V Warringah postponed

===== Finals =====
====== Finals Rd1 ======
Finals Rd1 match 1

12 September 2009
15:00

Randwick	v	Eastwood

Pittwater Rugby Park

Finals Rd1 match 2

13 September 2009

Eastern Suburbs	v	Manly

Forshaw Rugby Park

====== Semi-finals ======
Semi-final 1

19 September 2009

1st	v	Rd1 match 2

Semi-final 2

19 September 2009

2nd	v	Rd1 match 1

====== Final ======
26 September 2009

semi final 1	v	semi final 2

TBC

==== Third Grade (JR Henderson Shield) ====
2009 JR Henderson Shield Table
	Team	Pld	W	D	L	PF	PA	PD	BP	Pts
1	Gordon	12	10	0	2	436	143	296	8	49
2	Sydney University	12	10	0	2	430	103	327	7	47
3	Warringah	12	9	2	1	324	125	199	5	45
4	Manly	12	8	1	3	360	148	212	6	40
5	West Harbour	13	8	0	5	375	140	235	6	38
6	Randwick	13	6	2	5	342	227	115	6	34
7	Eastern Suburbs	13	6	0	7	302	221	81	7	31
8	Southern Districts	13	6	0	7	212	295	-83	5	29
9	Northern Suburbs	12	5	0	7	260	247	-25	5	25
10	Eastwood	13	3	1	9	283	348	-65	3	17
11	Penrith	12	1	0	11	106	679	-573	2	6
12	Parramatta	13	0	0	13	80	832	-752	0	0

  - RD9 Manly v Gordon postponed till June 30
    ** RD12 Sydney University V Penrith postponed
    Rd 12 Northern Suburbs V Warringah postponed

===== Finals =====
====== Finals Rd1 ======
Finals Rd1 match 1

12 September 2009
15:00

3rd	v	6th

Finals Rd1 match 2

12 September 2009

4th	v	5th

====== Semi-finals ======
Semi-final 1

19 September 2009

1st	v	Rd1 match 2

Semi-final 2

19 September 2009

2nd	v	Rd1 match 1

====== Final ======
26 September 2009

semi final 1	v	semi final 2

TBC

==== Fourth Grade (Henderson Cup) ====
2009 Henderson Table
	Team	Pld	W	D	L	PF	PA	PD	BP	Pts
1	Randwick	13	13	0	0	404	118	284	8	61
2	Sydney University	12	9	0	3	323	91	332	9	45
3	Gordon	12	9	0	3	302	178	124	6	44
4	West Harbour	12	8	0	4	297	149	148	11	43
5	Manly	12	9	0	3	289	165	124	6	42
6	Warringah	11	6	0	5	203	119	84	6	30
7	Northern Suburbs	12	6	0	6	191	247	-56	4	28
8	Eastern Suburbs	13	6	0	7	210	280	-70	4	28
9	Southern Districts	13	4	0	9	219	270	-51	6	22
10	Eastwood	13	3	0	10	221	329	-108	4	17
11	Penrith	12	1	0	11	120	567	-447	3	7

- Parramatta Withdrew from the Henderson Cup in Rd7
  - RD9 Manly V Gordon postponed till August 22 June
    RD9 West Harbour V Warringah postponed till August 22
    RD12 Sydney University V Penrith postponed
    Rd 12 Northern Suburbs V Warringah postponed

===== Finals =====
====== Finals Rd1 ======
Finals Rd1 match 1

12 September 2009
15:00

3rd	v	6th

Finals Rd1 match 2

12 September 2009

4th	v	5th

====== Semi-finals ======
Semi-final 1

19 September 2009

1st	v	Rd1 match 2

Semi-final 2

19 September 2009

2nd	v	Rd1 match 1

====== Final ======
26 September 2009

semi final 1	v	semi final 2

TBC

=== Colts (Under 20s) ===
==== First Colts (W. McMahon Memorial Shield) ====
2009 W. McMahon Shield Table
	Team	Pld	W	D	L	B	PF	PA	PD	BP	Pts
1	Sydney University	13	9	0	0	4	373	101	272	11	61
2	Manly	13	8	0	2	3	305	237	68	8	54
3	Gordon	13	6	0	3	3	360	199	161	11	53
4	Eastern Suburbs	13	7	0	4	2	288	247	51	3	45
5	Southern Districts	13	6	0	5	2	305	241	64	8	42
6	Northern Suburbs	12	4	0	6	2	202	278	-76	6	31
7	Warringah	12	5	0	5	2	190	300	-110	2	28
8	West Harbour	13	2	1	8	2	184	324	-140	5	25
9	Eastwood	13	2	0	9	2	246	308	-67	5	24
10	Randwick	13	1	1	9	2	182	395	-213	7	22

- Warringah lost 4 competition points for breaching of rules
  Sydney University lost 4 points for breaching the player points cap in round 3.
  - RD12 Northern Suburbs V Warringah postponed

===== Finals =====
====== Finals Rd1 ======
Finals Rd1 match 1

12 September 2009
15:00

3rd	v	6th

Finals Rd1 match 2

12 September 2009

4th	v	5th

====== Semi-finals ======
Semi-final 1

19 September 2009

1st	v	Rd1 match 2

Semi-final 2

19 September 2009

2nd	v	Rd1 match 1

====== Final ======
26 September 2009

semi final 1	v	semi final 2

TBC

==== Second Colts (Shell Trophy) ====
2009 Shell Trophy Table
	Team	Pld	W	D	L	PF	PA	PD	BP	Pts
1	Sydney University	13	12	0	1	644	88	557	11	59
2	Eastern Suburbs	13	11	0	2	398	98	300	10	54
3	Gordon	13	9	0	4	467	222	245	11	47
4	Manly	13	7	2	4	385	200	185	10	42
5	West Harbour	13	8	0	5	310	257	53	9	41
6	Eastwood	13	8	2	3	262	185	77	3	39
7	Randwick	13	6	1	6	290	298	-8	7	34
8	Northern Suburbs	12	4	2	6	218	272	-54	6	26
9	Southern Districts	13	5	0	8	253	324	-71	6	26
10	Parramatta	13	1	1	11	204	494	-290	7	13
11	Warringah	12	2	0	10	122	432	-310	1	9
12	Penrith	13	0	0	13	106	789	-683	6	6

  - RD12 Northern Suburbs V Warringah postponed

===== Finals =====
====== Finals Rd1 ======
Finals Rd1 match 1

12 September 2009
15:00

3rd	v	6th

Finals Rd1 match 2

12 September 2009

4th	v	5th

====== Semi-finals ======
Semi-final 1

19 September 2009

1st	v	Rd1 match 2

Semi-final 2

19 September 2009

2nd	v	Rd1 match 1

====== Final ======
26 September 2009

semi final 1	v	semi final 2

TBC

==== Third Colts ====
2009 Shute Shield Third Colts Table
Pos	Team	Pld	W	D	L	PF	PA	PD	BP	Pts
1	Sydney University	13	13	0	0	656	544	+112	12	64
2	Eastern Suburbs	13	10	0	3	438	112	+326	9	49
3	Gordon	13	11	0	2	385	129	+256	4	48
4	Randwick	13	9	0	4	340	209	+131	8	44
5	Manly	13	7	0	6	348	264	+84	9	37
6	Northern Suburbs	12	6	1	5	224	269	−45	3	29 (Note: RD12 Northern Suburbs V Warringah postponed)
7	West Harbour	13	5	1	7	228	302	−74	6	28
8	Warringah	12	6	0	6	197	249	−52	3	27 (Note: Warringah lost 2 competition points following its early forfeit in RD4 resulting in 3 net bonus points)
9	Parramatta	13	3	1	9	135	401	−266	3	17
10	Eastwood	13	3	1	9	268	343	−75	2	16 (Note: Eastwood lost 6 competition points for playing a suspended player resulting in a 2 net bonus points)
11	Southern Districts	13	2	0	11	225	322	−97	6	14
12	Penrith	13	0	0	13	76	835	−759	6	6

===== Finals =====
====== Finals Rd1 ======
Finals Rd1 match 1

12 September 2009
15:00

3rd	v	6th

Finals Rd1 match 2

12 September 2009

4th	v	5th

====== Semi-finals ======
Semi-final 1

19 September 2009

1st	v	Rd1 match 2

Semi-final 2

19 September 2009

2nd	v	Rd1 match 1

====== Final ======
26 September 2009

semi final 1	v	semi final 2

TBC

== Club Championship ==
Club competition points are calculated thus: 1st grade x 15, 2nd grade x 8, 3rd grade x 5, 4th grade x 4, 1st colts x 6, 2nd colts x 3, 3rd colts x 2

=== Grade (Gregor George Cup) ===
	Team	Pts
1	Sydney University	4028
2	Gordon	3341
3	Manly	3068
4	Randwick	3014
5	Eastern Suburbs	2966
6	West Harbour	2600
7	Warringah	2516
8	Eastwood	2329
9	Southern Districts	1932
10	Northern Suburbs	1926
11	Penrith	453
12	Parramatta	404

  - Parramatta lost 4 competition points in 4th grade and 16 club championship points following its late forfeit in RD5

=== Colts (Eric Spilstead Shield) ===
	Team	Pts
1	Sydney University	1152
2	Eastern Suburbs	906
3	Gordon	884
4	Manly	814
5	Southern Districts	650
6	West Harbour	627
7	Northern Suburbs	614
8	Eastwood	530
9	Randwick	511
10	Warringah	428
11	Parramatta	170
12	Penrith	0
