= Hugh Roach =

Australian rugby union player

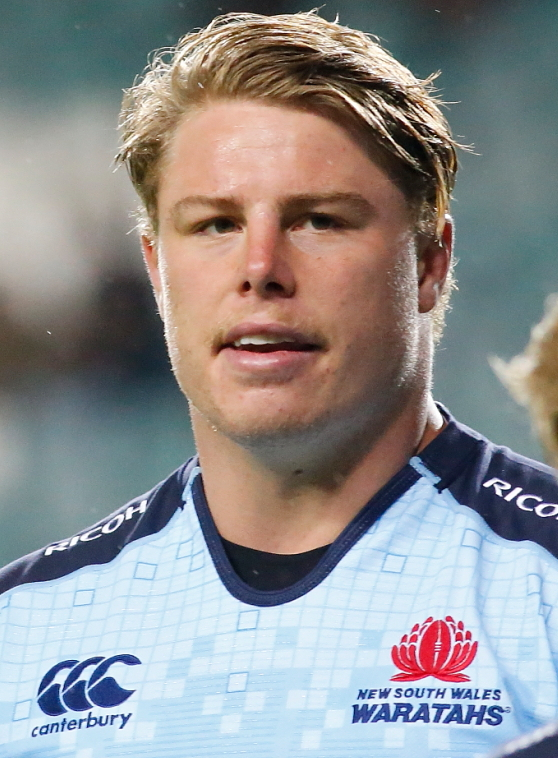
- Roach as a member of the New South Wales Waratahs in 2017
- Full name: Hugh Roach
- Born: 11 September 1992 (age 34) Sydney, New South Wales, Australia
- Height: 178 cm (5 ft 10 in)
- Weight: 110 kg (17 st 5 lb; 243 lb)
- School: Newington College

Rugby union career
- Position: Hooker
Amateur team(s)
Years	Team	Apps	(Points)
2012–2018	Eastwood	85	(120)
Senior career
Years	Team	Apps	(Points)
2013–2018	Waratahs	60	(50)
2014–2017	Greater Sydney Rams	16	(25)
2019	Rebels	8	(0)
2019	Tasman	10	(20)
2020	Crusaders	1	(0)
2021–2022	Austin Gilgronis	23	(70)
2021	USA Perpignan	15	(0)
2023	Chicago Hounds	6	(15)
2024-	San Diego Legion	11	(0)
- Correct as of 17 March 2023
International career
Years	Team	Apps	(Points)
2009–2010	Australia Schoolboys	11	(35)
2011–2012	Australia Under 20	10	(20)
- Correct as of 14 July 2016

Hugh Roach (born 11 September 1992) is an Australian rugby union professional player who plays hooker for the San Diego Legion of Major League Rugby (MLR) in the United States. He also plays for the USA Perpignan of Top 14 (France).

== Family and early life ==
Roach was born in Sydney. He played his junior rugby at Hunters Hill Rugby Club, and attended Newington College. His father, Graham Roach, was also a first grade rugby player who played at hooker for Western Suburbs in the Shute Shield competition.

Roach was an Australia Schoolboys representative in 2009 and 2010, and is currently the equal most capped schools rugby player in Australia. He was also a member of the Australia Under 20 side for both the 2011 where he made 3 appearances (Fiji, Samoa, New Zealand) and 2012 IRB Junior World Championships where he was capped a further 4 times ( Scotland, Argentina, France twice).

== Rugby career ==
Roach initially made his name playing for Eastwood in the Shute Shield competition and was named Shute Shield Rookie of the Year after the 2013 tournament. This good form saw him picked by the Western Force for their match against the British and Irish Lions in June 2013.

He made the Waratahs extended playing squad for the 2014 Super Rugby season as third-choice hooker behind Tatafu Polota-Nau and Tolu Latu. An injury to Latu in the latter stages of the season saw Roach earn his first Super Rugby cap as a second-half substitute in the Waratahs 41-13 victory over the Lions on 18 May 2014.

The 2015 season brought further success on the field with Roach earning a further 6 Super Rugby caps for the Waratahs .In the domestic club competition, he added another Shute Shield grand final win (his second in three GF appearances) in a performance that saw him voted the Man of the Match by the TV broadcast team.

The 2016 season saw Roach earn a further 13 appearances for the Waratahs. With a total of 21 super appearances under his belt the Tahs prioritized the re-signing of Roach in June 2016 committing him for a further 2 seasons at Moore Park. In 2017 he earned a further 9 caps for the Waratahs taking his career total Super rugby caps to 30 at the conclusion of the 2017 season. In season 2018 Roach continued his good form making a further 9 appearances in the first 10 rounds of the Super Rugby competition including stand out performances against the Stormers from Cape Town, the Sharks in Durban and 70 minutes of high energy play against the competition leaders the Crusaders in Christchurch.

2019 saw a move to Melbourne Rebels where Roach added a further 8 super caps to his record taking his total to 49. He took up a playing contract with Tasman Mako in New Zealand's Mitre 10 Cup later that year where he played 10 games then signed a contract to play for London Irish in the UK Premiership but that was terminated because of Roach having a foot injury. Roach then came to the Crusaders in a rush to find a replacement hooker and made his debut off the bench against the Sunwolves.
