= Gabriele Venditti =

Polish rugby union player

- Born: 25 April 1997 (age 29) Pyskowice, Poland
- Height: 200 cm (6 ft 7 in)
- Weight: 135 kg (298 lb; 21 st 4 lb)

Rugby union career
- Position(s): Lock, Flanker, Number 8
- Current team: Hunter Wildfires
Youth career
- Arvalia Villa Pamphili Rugby Roma, Nuova Rugby Roma
Senior career
| Years | Team | Apps | (Points) |
| 2016−2017 | Lazio | 3 | (0) |
| 2017–2021 | Calvisano | 48 | (50) |
| 2020 | →Zebre Parma | 1 | (0) |
| 2020–2023 | Zebre Parma | 11 | (5) |
| 2023 | Calvisano | | |
| 2024− | Hunter Wildfires | | |
- Correct as of 12 November 2022
International career
| Years | Team | Apps | (Points) |
| 2016–2017 | Italy U20 | 10 | (5) |
- Correct as of 12 November 2022

Gabriele Venditti (born 25 April 1997) is a Polish-born Italian professional rugby union player who primarily plays lock for Hunter Wildfires in Australian Shute Shield.

== Professional career ==
Venditti previously played for clubs such as Lazio and Calvisano. Under contract with Calvisano, in 2020–21 Pro14 season, he was named as Additional Player for Zebre. From 2020 to 2023 he played for Zebre Parma in the United Rugby Championship. In Autumn 2023 he shortly come back in Calvisano in Italian Serie A.

In 2016 and 2017, Venditti was named in the Italy Under 20 squad.
