= Andrew Leeds =

Andrew Leeds may refer to:

- Andrew Leeds (rugby) (born 1964), Australian rugby union and rugby league footballer
- Andrew Leeds (actor) (born 1981), American actor, comedian and writer.
