= Shane Nightingale =

Australian rugby union player (1959–2020)

- Full name: Shane Norbert Nightingale
- Born: 31 July 1959 Murwillumbah, NSW, Australia
- Died: 9 February 2020 (aged 60)
- Height: 191 cm (6 ft 3 in)
- Weight: 103 kg (227 lb)

Rugby union career
- Position: Lock
International career
Years	Team	Apps	(Points)
1982	Australia		

Shane Norbert Nightingale (31 July 1959 — 9 February 2020) was an Australian rugby union player.

Nightingale was born in the town of Murwillumbah in New South Wales. He attended St Gregory's College in Sydney and finished his schooling at Brisbane's St Columban's College, from where he gained selection to an Australian Schoolboys side stacked with future internationals. A lock, Nightingale debuted in first-grade for Brisbane club Brothers in 1979 and made his Queensland representative debut the following year, the first of 33 state caps.

In 1982, Nightingale won a Wallabies call up for the tour of New Zealand, making his debut in the tour match against Taranaki. He then missed two weeks with a knee injury, ruling him out of the first Test, and was moved to number eight on his return to the XV. An injury to lock Duncan Hall in the second Test opened up a position for the final Test, but the place went to Phil Clements. He finished the tour having made five uncapped appearances.
