= Jim Williams (rugby union) =

Australia international rugby union player

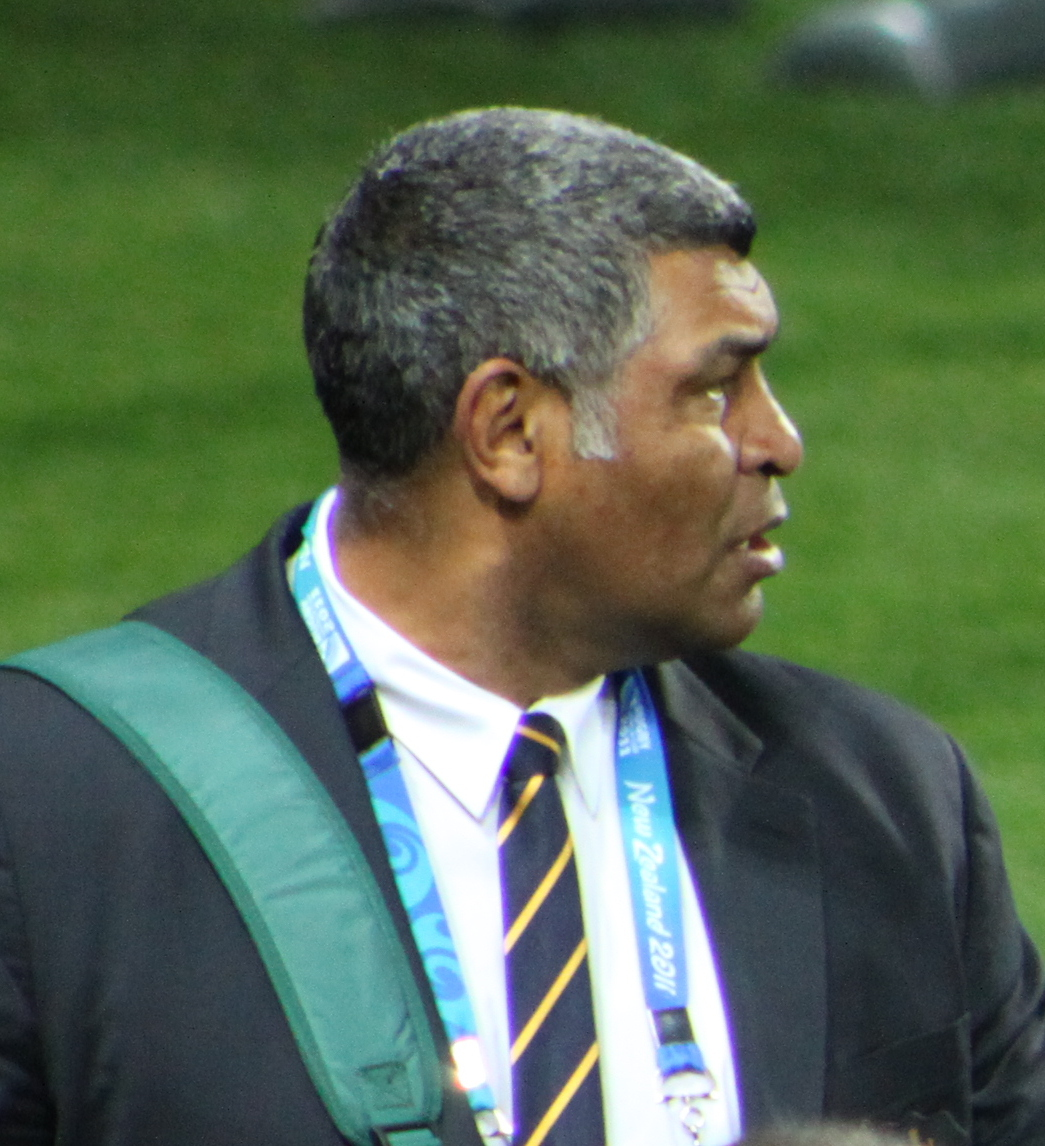
- Born: R.W. Williams; 8 December 1968 (age 57) Young, New South Wales, Australia
- Height: 193 cm (6 ft 4 in)
- Weight: 113 kg (17 st 11 lb; 249 lb)
- Occupation: Assistant coach

Rugby union career
- Position: Flanker /Number eight
- Current team: Retired
Senior career
Years	Team	Apps	(Points)
?	Young	?	(?)
?	Wests	?	(?)
1994–95	W. Hartlepool	?	(?)
1996	Waratahs	?	(?)
1997	Warringah	?	(?)
1998–2001	Brumbies	?	(?)
2001–05	Munster	74	(74)
2015	Greater Sydney Rams		
International career
Years	Team	Apps	(Points)
?-1999	Australia (sevens)	?	(?)
1999–2000	Australia	14	(10)
Coaching career
- Years: Team
- 2006–07: Munster (Assistant coach)
- 2007–08: Munster (Forwards coach)
- 2008–11: Australia (Assistant)
Medal record
Men's rugby sevens
Representing Australia
Commonwealth Games
Bronze medal – third place	1998 Kuala Lumpur	Team competition

Jim Williams (born 8 December 1968) is a former international rugby union player and coach. He was most recently assistant coach to the Australian national rugby union team. Williams was head coach of the Greater Sydney Rams in the National Rugby Championship during 2015, succeeding Brian Melrose

== Early life ==
Born in Young, New South Wales, Williams played rugby league as a boy. He began rugby union after joining the army at age 17. He played for Young RFC, then moved to Brisbane where he played for Wests Bulldogs.

== West Hartlepool, England ==
Williams moved to England in 1994 and played one season with West Hartlepool.

== Australian rugby ==
On returning to Australia, Williams played Sydney club rugby while remaining on the fringes of the NSW Waratahs team. It wasn't until he changed to the back row that he was able to find enough form to be picked up by Eddie Jones at the ACT Brumbies in 1998. It was his form playing for the Brumbies that led to his selection for the Australian squad for the 1999 Rugby World Cup.

== Munster & Ireland ==
After missing Wallabies selection in 2001, Williams accepted a two-year deal with Munster, and soon captained the Irish club. He played 30 Heineken Cup matches for Munster, and scored 15 points. Williams played until 2005 when he was appointed assistant coach.

== Wallabies assistant coach ==
He continued in coaching roles at Munster until 2008 when new Wallabies coach Robbie Deans offered him the Assistant Coach role. At the start of Australia's international rugby season in June 2008 Williams took up his new role alongside fellow assistant Michael Foley. Williams left the Wallabies in 2011.
