= John Griffiths (rugby union) =

John Griffiths OAM
- Full name: John Ernest Griffiths
- Born: 18 February 1948 Sydney, Australia
- Died: 10 November 2020 (aged 72)
- Height: 180 cm (5 ft 11 in)
- Weight: 112 kg (247 lb)

Rugby union career
- Position: Prop
International career
Years	Team	Apps	(Points)
1982	Australia		

John Ernest Griffiths OAM (18 February 1948 — 10 November 2020) was an Australian rugby union player.

== Biography ==
Griffiths grew up in Sydney, where he was educated at Westmead Boys High School and Granville Boys High School.

A tighthead prop, Griffiths was a strong scrummager and began in first-grade with Parramatta. He relocated west in 1973 and he spent the remainder of the decade playing for Perth club Associates. Returning to Sydney, Griffiths made the Wallabies trials in 1981 and the following year debuted for New South Wales. He won Wallabies selection in 1982 for the tour of New Zealand at the late age of 34. Injuries hampered him throughout the tour and after debuting in an uncapped match against Taranaki he suffered a career-ending ruptured achilles tendon against Waikato.

Griffiths coached the NSW under 21s and was an assistant coach under Greg Smith for the Wallabies in 1997.

With his wife Janette, Griffiths ran a cinema in Narooma, New South Wales, called "Narooma Kinema". He was awarded a Medal of the Order of Australia (OAM) in the 2019 Australia Day Honours, for service to the community of the NSW South Coast.
