= Brian Melrose =

- Born: Brian Melrose; 9 May 1963 (age 63)

Rugby union career
- Position(s): Fly-half, Inside Centre
Senior career
Years	Team	Apps	(Points)
1982–86,1991–92, 1999	Parramatta		
1987–90, 1993–96	Western Suburbs		
1997–98	Eastwood		
Coaching career
- Years: Team
- 2014: Greater Sydney Rams
- 2009: Eastwood
- 2007: Western Sydney Rams
- 2003–04: Manly RUFC
- 2001–02: West Harbour RFC
- 1999: Parramatta

Brian "Billy" Melrose (born 9 May 1963) is an Australian professional rugby union coach and former player who played as a fly half and inside centre. He was head coach of the Greater Sydney Rams for the inaugural season of Australia's National Rugby Championship in 2014.

== Family and early life ==
Brian Melrose grew up in Baulkham Hills in Sydney as the third of four brothers who all played first-grade rugby. His brother Tony Melrose is a former Wallaby who also played rugby league for Parramatta, Souths, Easts, Manly and New South Wales.

== Rugby career ==
Melrose played as a fly-half or centre in Sydney's club rugby competition for Parramatta, Western Suburbs (now West Harbour), and Eastwood in the 1980s and 1990s. He won the A.L. Vincent Trophy for the best and fairest player at Western Suburbs in 1994. Melrose played 240 first-grade games between 1982 and 1999, returning to his first club Parramatta, as first-grade captain-coach before retiring.

== Coaching career ==
Melrose was appointed co-coach of the previously struggling West Harbour club in 2001 and improved immediately, with the team reaching the playoffs in 2001 and 2002. He was named the NSW Premier Rugby 'Coach of the Year' in 2002. Manly RUFC recruited Melrose as Head Coach for the 2003 season and again improved his team's position (from 10th in 2002) to reach the play-offs in 2003 and 2004.

He undertook a coaching study tour of the UK before joining the New South Wales Waratahs as attack and kicking coach for the 2005 season. It was the Waratahs' most successful Super Rugby season, making the grand final for the first time and following that up with another finals appearance in 2006.

Melrose was appointed Head Coach of the Western Sydney Rams for the inaugural Australian Rugby Championship in 2007. Despite predictions that the team would finish near the bottom of the standings, the Rams won the minor premiership under his direction.

He was Head Coach of the Australia under 20s team which finished fifth place at the 2008 IRB Junior World Championships, and Head Coach of Eastwood in 2009.

Melrose left for Ireland in 2010 to take up a contract as assistant coach with Connacht in the Pro12 competition. He was recruited to London Irish in 2011. Returning to Australia in 2013, he worked on his building business and worked with NRL club St George-Illawarra as a skills coach.

The Greater Sydney Rams appointed Melrose as Head Coach for the 2014 season, renewing their association with the coach that took the Western Sydney Rams to the Minor Premiership in 2007.
