= Stuart Gregory =

Australian rugby union international

- Full name: Stuart Carlton Gregory
- Born: 18 August 1946 (age 80) Brisbane, Australia

Rugby union career
- Position: Lock
International career
Years	Team	Apps	(Points)
1968–73	Australia	16	(0)

Stuart Carlton Gregory (born 18 August 1946) is an Australian former rugby union international.

Educated at Brisbane Boys' College, Gregory was a lock who excelled as a lineout jumper.

Gregory was capped 16 times for the Wallabies, debuting against the All Blacks at Ballymore in 1968. He featured in tours to Britain, Ireland, South Africa and France during his Wallabies career. After relocating to Sydney for work in 1972, Gregory played first-grade rugby for Eastwood and in 1974 declared himself no longer available for Test selection.

== See also ==
- List of Australia national rugby union players
