= Peter Kay (rugby union) =

Australian rugby union international

- Full name: Peter Noel Kay
- Born: 21 March 1966 (age 60) Adelaide, Australia

Rugby union career
- Position: Prop
International career
Years	Team	Apps	(Points)
1988	Australia	1	(0)

Peter Noel Kay (born 21 March 1966) is an Australian former rugby union international.

Kay, born in Adelaide, South Australia, attended Evans High School in the western Sydney suburb of Blacktown.

A prop, Kay played 20 years of first-grade rugby for Parramatta Two Blues. He debuted for New South Wales in 1987, forming a front row with Ewen McKenzie and Eddie Jones. His solitary international cap came the following year in the 2nd Test against England at Concord Oval, Sydney, which the Wallabies won 28–8.

== See also ==
- List of Australia national rugby union players
