= 1982 Australia rugby union tour of New Zealand =

Summary
P	W	D	L
Total
14	10	0	4
Test match
3	1	0	2
Opponent
P	W	D	L
New Zealand
3	1	0	2

The 1982 Australia rugby union tour of New Zealand was a series of fourteen matches played by the Australia national rugby union team (nicknamed the Wallabies) in New Zealand between July and September 1982 . The Wallabies won ten of the fourteen matches and lost the other four. The international match series against the New Zealand national rugby union team (the All Blacks) resulted in a 2–1 win for New Zealand, who won the first and third matches, with Australia winning the second match. New Zealand thereby regained the Bledisloe Cup, which had been held by Australia since 1979.

The Australian touring party lacked international experience. Nine senior players were unavailable for the tour and seventeen of the thirty selected for the tour had not been capped by Australia previously. Only five of the sixteen forwards had played internationals. Despite losing the international series the tour proved good for the future of Australian rugby – in his assessment for Rothmans Rugby Yearbook New Zealand writer Don Cameron stated that "This represented the greatest triumph of all...Australia now has a deep fund of test-tried players". Amongst the new players selected by Australia was David Campese, who would go on to play for Australia 101 times and score 64 tries in international matches, which remains an Australia record as of 2023.

== Matches ==
Scores and results list Australia's points tally first.

Opposing Team	Result	For	Against	Date	Venue
Taranaki	Won	16	15	28 July	New Plymouth
Manawatu	Won	26	10	31 July	Palmerston North
Hawke's Bay	Won	13	12	4 August	Napier
Southland	Won	21	0	7 August	Invercargill
South Canterbury	Won	29	21	10 August	Timaru
NEW ZEALAND	Lost	16	23	14 August	Lancaster Park, Christchurch
Buller	Won	65	10	18 August	Westport
Otago	Won	29	12	21 August	Dunedin
Waikato	Won	23	3	24 August	Hamilton
NEW ZEALAND	Won	19	16	28 August	Athletic Park, Wellington
Bay of Plenty	Lost	16	40	1 September	Rotorua
Counties	Lost	9	15	4 September	Pukekohe
North Auckland	Won	16	12	7 September	Whangārei
NEW ZEALAND	Lost	18	33	11 September	Eden Park, Auckland

== Touring party ==
- Manager: Chilla Wilson
- Assistant manager (Coach): Bob Dwyer
- Captain: Mark Ella

=== Backs ===
- Roger Gould
- Glen Ella
- David Campese
- Peter Grigg
- Michael Martin
- Andrew Slack
- Paul Southwell
- Gary Ella
- Ross Hanley
- Michael Hawker
- Tim Lane
- Mark Ella
- Phillip Cox
- Dominic Vaughan

=== Forwards ===
- Duncan Hall
- Steve Tuynman
- Chris Roche
- Simon Poidevin
- Peter Lucas
- Ross Reynolds
- Shane Nightingale
- Steve Cutler
- Phil Clements
- Steve Williams
- John Coolican
- John Griffiths
- Andy McIntyre
- John Meadows
- Stan Pilecki
- Bruce Malouf
- Lance Walker
