= Jed Holloway =

Australian rugby union player (born 1992)

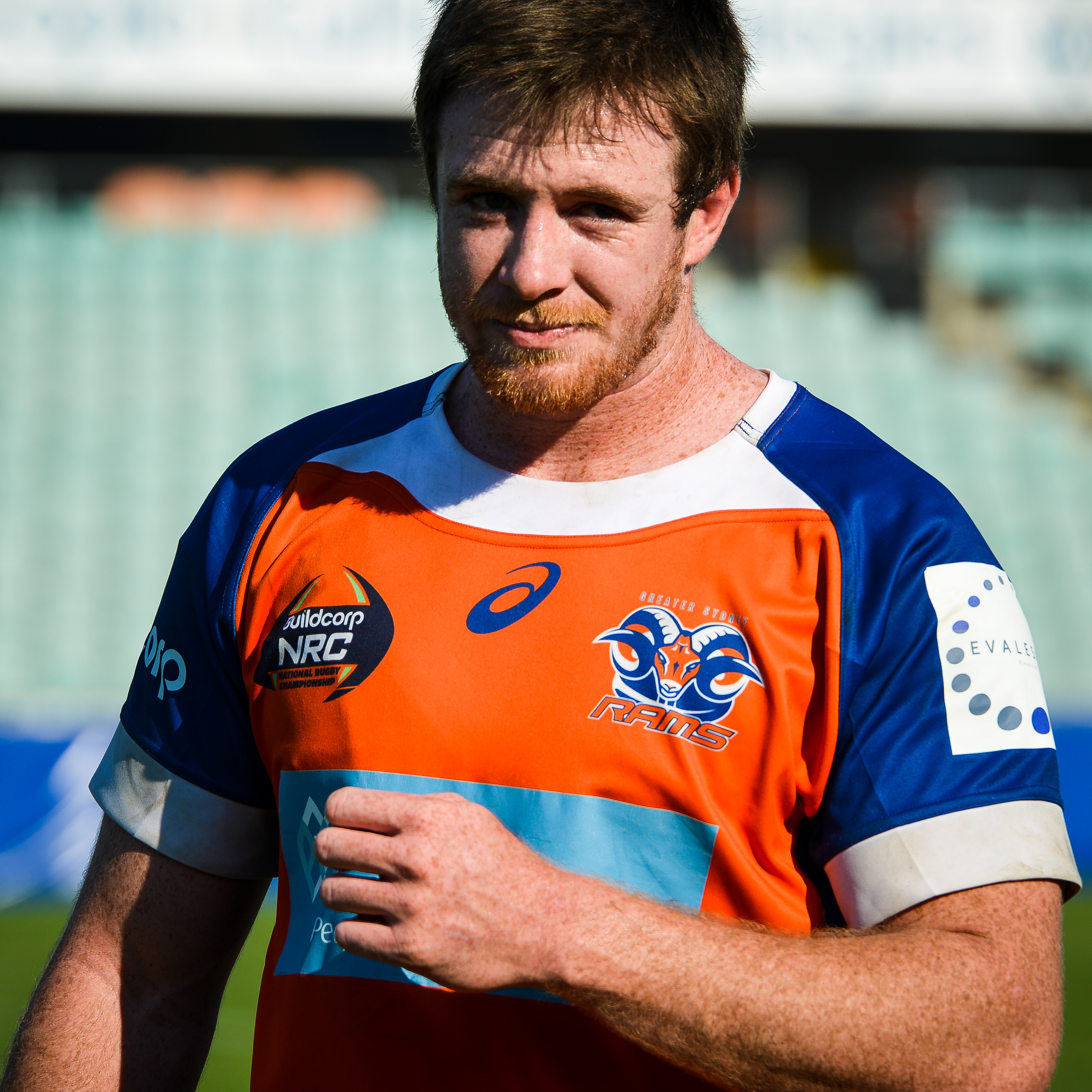
- Holloway playing for Greater Sydney Rams
- Born: Jed Holloway; 2 November 1992 (age 34) Wollongong, Australia
- Height: 1.95 m (6 ft 5 in)
- Weight: 118 kg (18.6 st; 260 lb)
- School: Waverley College

Rugby union career
- Position(s): Number 8, Flanker, Lock
- Current team: San Diego Legion
Senior career
Years	Team	Apps	(Points)
2013–2019	Southern Districts	60	(155)
2014–2017	Greater Sydney Rams	18	(65)
2018	NSW Country Eagles	5	(5)
2019	→ Munster (short-term)	4	(0)
2021–2022	Toyota Verblitz	2	(0)
2024–2025	Leicester Tigers	6	(0)
2025–	San Diego Legion		
- Correct as of 27 January 2025
Super Rugby
Years	Team	Apps	(Points)
2013–2020, 2022-2024	Waratahs	103	(45)
- Correct as of 27 August 2024
International career
Years	Team	Apps	(Points)
2010	Australian Schools	1	(0)
2022-2023	Australia	12	(0)
- Correct as of 7 November 2023

Jed Holloway (born 2 November 1992) is an Australian professional rugby union player for the San Diego Legion of Major League Rugby (MLR). He previously played for NSW Country Eagles, Waratahs and the Wallabies (the Australian national team), as well as Munster in the URC and Leicester Tigers in England's Premiership Rugby. His usual playing positions are number 8, flanker or lock.

== Early life ==
Holloway was born in Wollongong, where he first played junior rugby with the Woonona Shamrocks club. His family moved to Yamba in northern New South Wales when he was nine years of age. He attended McAuley Catholic College and he joined the Yamba Buccaneers junior rugby club. Holloway later attended Waverley College in Sydney and was selected for the Australian Schoolboys side in 2010.

== Rugby career ==
Holloway joined the Southern Districts club where he played his senior club rugby in the Shute Shield competition. He represented Australia U20 in South Africa at the 2012 IRB Junior World Championship.

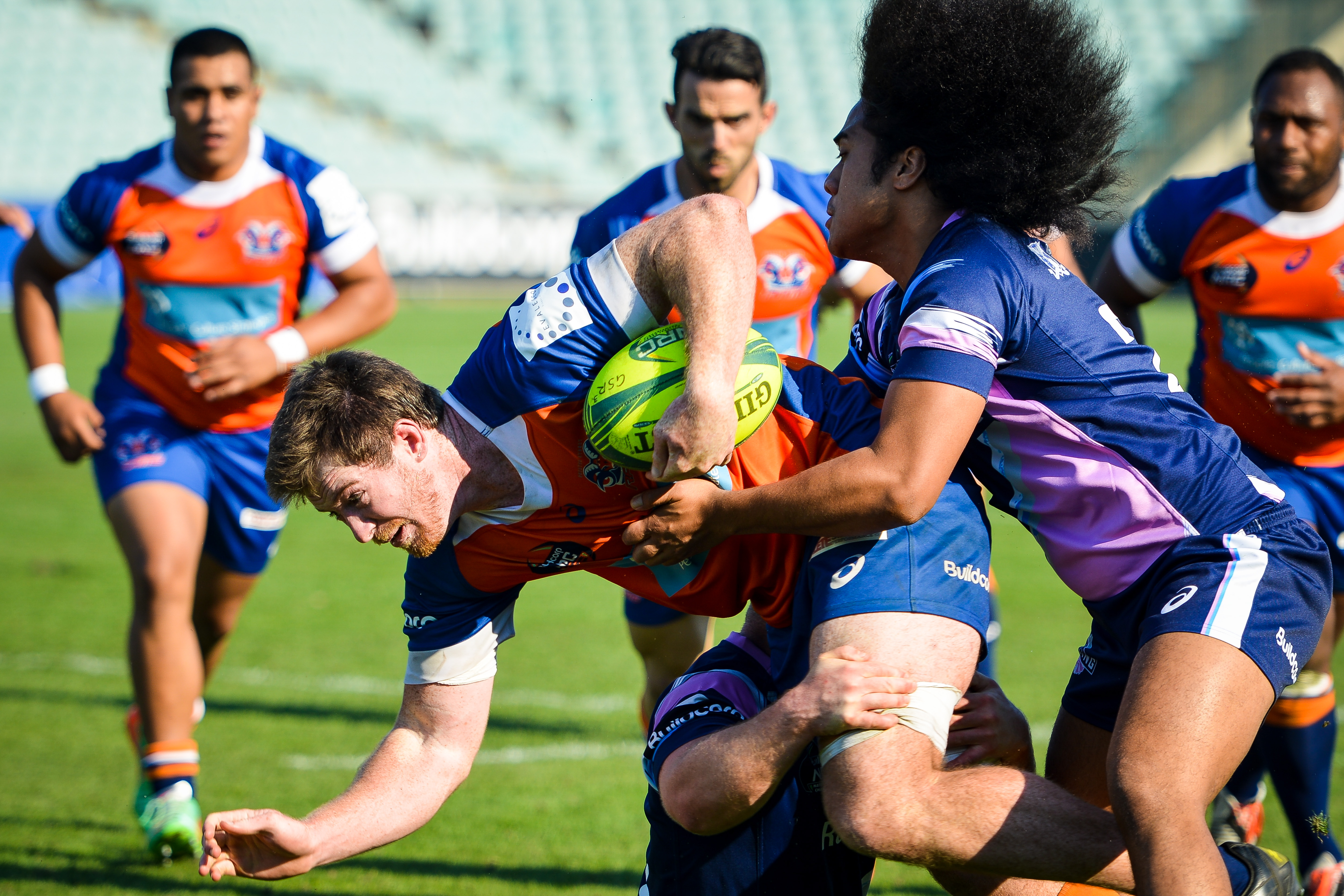
Jed playing for the Rams, 2014

He was contracted to the Waratahs extended playing squad for the 2013 season, and made his Super Rugby debut against the Western Force in March of that year. At the age of 21, Holloway was named captain of the Greater Sydney Rams team for the inaugural season of Australia's National Rugby Championship in 2014.

Holloway joined Irish Pro14 and Champions Cup side Munster on a two-month contract at the end of September 2019 to provide World Cup cover for the province. He made his debut for the province in their 2019–20 Pro14 round 2 fixture against South African side Southern Kings on 5 October 2019, which Munster won 31–20. His fourth and final appearance for Munster came in their 18–16 defeat against Scottish side Edinburgh on 29 November 2019.

On 26 November 2024, Holloway signed for Leicester Tigers on a short term basis due to injuries to other locks. In January 2025 Holloway's short term contract ended as he took a deal with San Diego Legion in Major League Rugby.

== International rugby career ==
Holloway had been tipped to be selected for the Wallabies in the three-test series against England in July 2022 but he was injured in training. After recovering, he finally made his debut for Australia against Argentina on 6 August 2022. He played both tests of the 2022 Bledisloe cup series against New Zealand, impressing with his tackling and ball carrying. In the majority of his matches for the Wallabies, he has started at blind-side flanker but he has also occasionally started at lock.

In January 2023, Holloway was named in the 44-man Wallabies training squad for the 2023 Rugby World Cup.

== Super Rugby statistics ==
As of 10 September 2019

Season	Team	Games	Starts	Sub	Mins	Tries	Cons	Pens	Drops	Points	Yel	Red
2013	Waratahs	4	2	2	155	0	0	0	0	0	1	0
2014	Waratahs	0	0	0	0	0	0	0	0	0	0	0
2015	Waratahs	0	0	0	0	0	0	0	0	0	0	0
2016	Waratahs	9	8	1	549	4	0	0	0	20	0	0
2017	Waratahs	10	4	6	357	0	0	0	0	0	0	0
2018	Waratahs	18	10	8	835	1	0	0	0	5	0	0
2019	Waratahs	11	7	4	614	1	0	0	0	5	0	1
Total		52	31	21	2510	6	0	0	0	30	1	1
