= Paul Southwell (rugby union) =

- Full name: Paul George Southwell
- Born: 25 August 1956 (age 70) Canberra, Australia
- School: Watson High School
- University: University of Queensland
- Occupation: Teacher

Rugby union career
- Position: Utility back
International career
Years	Team	Apps	(Points)
1982	Australia		

Paul George Southwell (born 25 August 1956) is an Australian former rugby union player.

Southwell grew up in Canberra and attended Watson High School. He was a New South Wales under 18s captain and made the Australian Schools representative team for a tour of New Zealand.

After moving to Goulburn in 1976, Southwell competed for the Southern Tablelands and within two years earned New South Wales Country honours. He made the Wallabies trials in 1981 and was placed on the wing, a position he had never previously played, as he was primarily a centre and halfback. Overlooked for selection, Southwell got another opportunity to impress the following year when he got his first New South Wales call up, and he subsequently won a place on the 1982 tour of New Zealand. He made five uncapped appearances during the tour.

Southwell finished his career in Queensland and represented his adopted state on a tour of Fiji. He played rugby for the University of Queensland and in a match against Redcliffe suffered a fractured neck, prompting his retirement.

A teacher by profession, Southwell is a former Head of Junior School at Radford College.
