= Tatafu Polota-Nau =

Australia international rugby union player

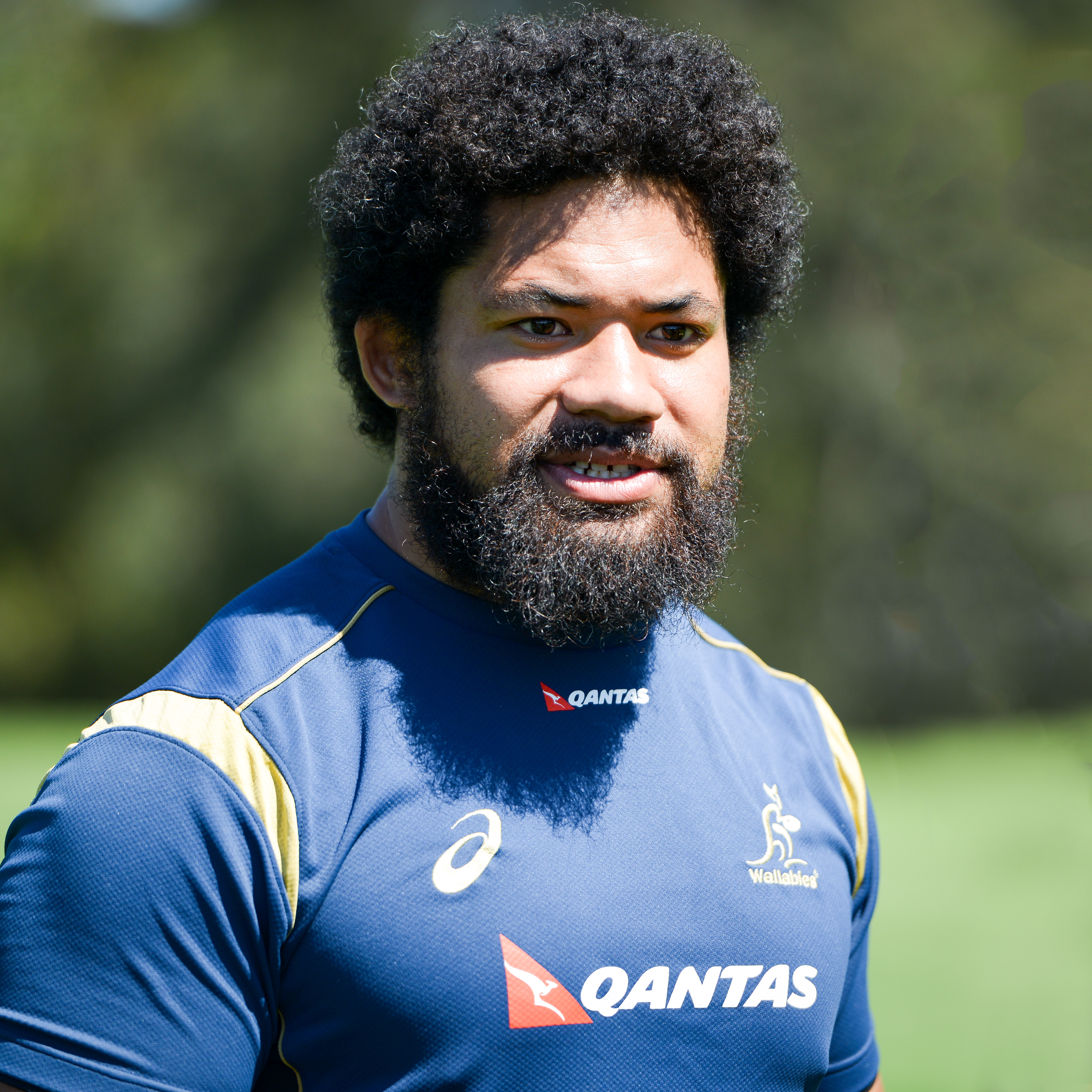
- Polota-Nau in 2014
- Born: Sione 'Utukiveisini Tatafu Polota-Nau; 26 July 1985 (age 41) Sydney, New South Wales, Australia
- Height: 181 cm (5 ft 11 1/2 in)
- Weight: 114 kg (251 lb; 17 st 13 lb)

Rugby union career
- Position: Hooker
Senior career
Years	Team	Apps	(Points)
2007, 2016	Western Sydney Rams	7	(0)
2014–15	Greater Sydney Rams	0	(0)
2017–2020	Leicester Tigers	46	(0)
- Correct as of 7 March 2020
Super Rugby
Years	Team	Apps	(Points)
2006–2016	Waratahs	140	(65)
2017	Force	13	(0)
2019 (Injury Cover)	Waratahs	2	(0)
- Correct as of 15 March 2019
International career
Years	Team	Apps	(Points)
2005–2019	Australia	90	(25)
	Australian Schoolboys	5	(0)
- Correct as of 9 September 2019
Medal record
Men's rugby union
Representing Australia
Rugby World Cup
Silver medal – second place	2015 England	Squad
Bronze medal – third place	2011 New Zealand	Squad

Sione 'Utukiveisini Tatafu Polota-Nau (born 26 July 1985) is an Australian former rugby union player who last played for Parramatta Two Blues in Australia's Shute Shield. He joined the club in December 2017.

== Family and early life ==
Polota-Nau was born in Camperdown, Sydney. He is the 2nd of three children (Moala, older sister; and Michael, younger brother) to Parents Audrey and Siosaia. He attended both Croydon Park Public School and Blaxcell Street Primary School. He attended Granville South Creative and Performing Arts School (was Granville South High).

He is the first cousin of rugby union footballer Salesi Ma'afu.

He is of Tongan heritage. Polota-Nau is the nephew of Hopoi Taione, who represented Japan in four rugby tests in the 1980s, and the 1st cousin of former professional wrestler Tonga Fifita, better known by the ring names "Haku" (World Wrestling Federation) and "Meng" (World Championship Wrestling).

== Rugby career ==
During his tenure at Granville South High School, Polota-Nau only began to learn the game of Rugby Union largely thanks to a teacher by the name of Paul Ridgway, who grew up and played the game as well as become a Personal Development/Health/Physical Education teacher that transferred to Granville South High. It was there that Polota-Nau took interest in not only learning the game in such a short space of time, but also to progress exponentially through the rugby representative pathway at the age of 16. Advancing to the Australian Development U17 team. Out of high school, Polota-Nau received a High Performance Unit (HPU) contract to join the ACT Brumbies at the end of the 2003 year. At 20 years of age, Polota-Nau achieved the rare feat of Test selection before playing a match at Super 14 level. His performances in his Test debut against England at Twickenham and in the win over Ireland at Lansdowne Road were impressive.

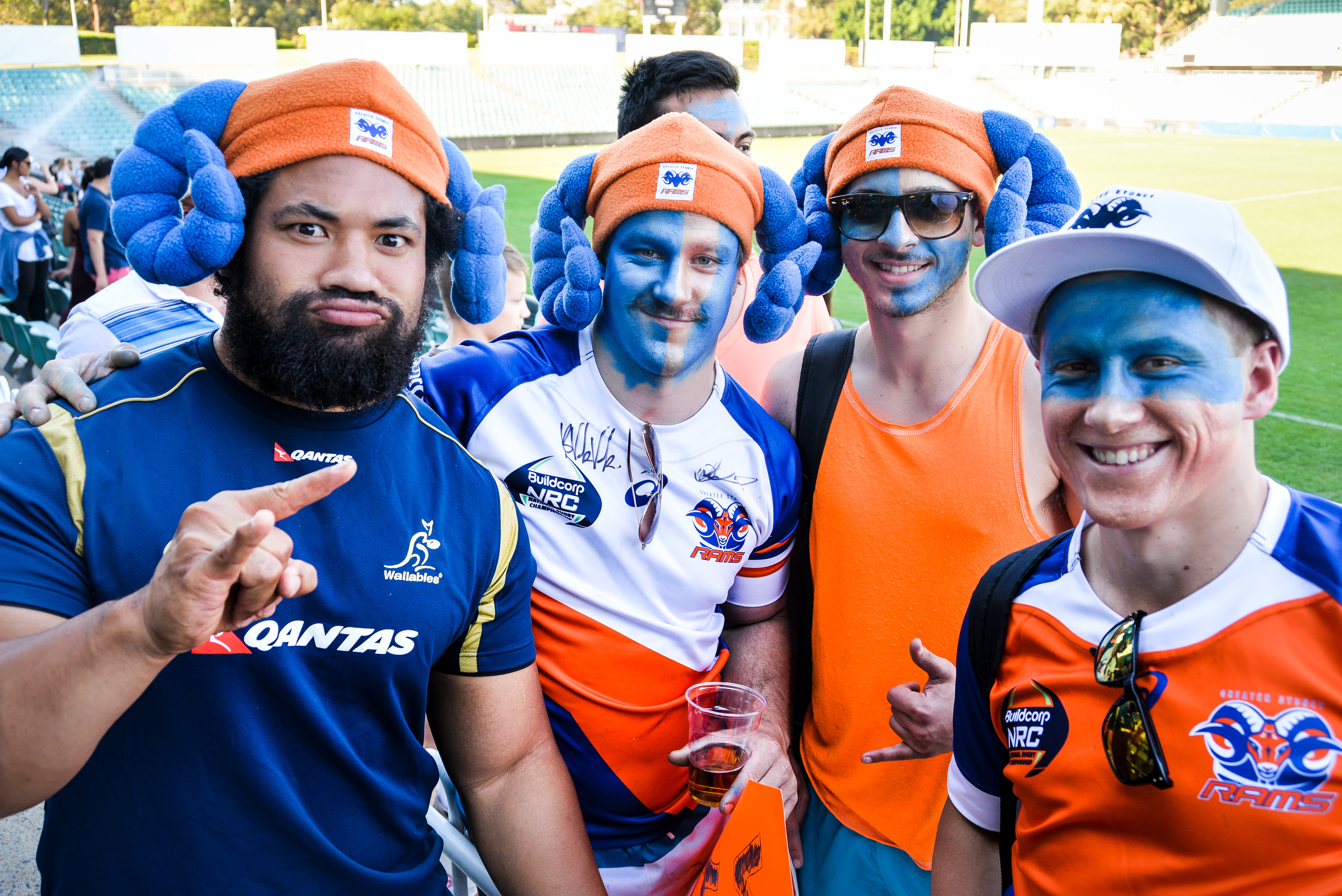
Tatafu with Greater Sydney Rams Fans

Signed to the New South Wales Waratahs shortly after the end of the 2005 Super 12, he made his provincial debut against Auckland in July and made his first Super 14 appearance in 2006.

He worked in recent times to improve his set piece in partnership with hooking partner and fellow Wallaby Adam Freier. Polota-Nau was named in the Greater Sydney Rams squad for the 2014 and 2015 National Rugby Championship seasons but did not play for the team due to being required for the Australian national side.

On 9 November 2017 Polota-Nau signed for Leicester Tigers in England's Premiership Rugby on a 2 1/2-year contract having previously played 146 matches of Super Rugby for a decade with the Waratahs and more recently for one season with the Western Force. Polota-Nau's move abroad came on the back of the downsizing of Super Rugby and the removal of the Force from the competition. Under Giteau's Law Polota-Nau will still be available for international selection.
