= Jackie Shute =

Australia international rugby union player

- Born: John Lawson Shute; 31 January 1901 Mudgee, New South Wales
- Died: 23 November 1988 (aged 87) Sydney

Rugby union career
- Position: wing
International career
Years	Team	Apps	(Points)
1920–22	Wallabies	3	(6)

John Lawson Shute CMG OBE (31 January 1901 – 23 November 1988) was a rugby union player who represented Australia.

Shute, a wing, was born near Sydney and claimed a total of 3 international rugby caps for Australia.

He was later chairman of the Australian Meat Board. He was appointed an Officer of the Order of the British Empire (OBE) in the 1959 Birthday Honours and a Companion of the Order of St Michael and St George (CMG) in the 1970 New Year Honours, for public services.
