= Andrew Leeds (rugby) =

Australia international rugby union & league footballer

Personal information
- Full name: Andrew Jacob Leeds
- Born: 19 September 1964 (age 61) Wentworthville, New South Wales, Australia
- Height: 186 cm (6 ft 1 in)
- Weight: 90 kg (14 st 2 lb)

Playing information

Rugby union
- Position: Full Back
Club
Years	Team	Pld	T	G	FG	P
1985–89	Parramatta Rugby Club
1997–98	Leicester Tigers	6	0	0	0	0
	Total	6	0	0	0	0
Representative
Years	Team	Pld	T	G	FG	P
1986–88	Australia	14	5			43

Rugby league
- Position: Fullback, Centre
Club
Years	Team	Pld	T	G	FG	P
1989–91	Parramatta Eels	44	6	82		188
1992	Penrith Panthers	19	3	41		94
1993–99	Western Suburbs	114	27	240	5	593
1995–96	Wakefield Trinity	8	4	16		48
	Total	185	40	379	5	923
- Source: As of 31 March 2010

Andrew Leeds (born 19 September 1964) is an Australian former rugby union and professional rugby league footballer who played in the 1980s and 1990s. He played for the Western Suburbs Magpies, Parramatta Eels, Penrith Panthers and Wakefield Trinity in rugby league primarily as a goal-kicking fullback; and for Parramatta Two Blues and Leicester Tigers in rugby union, he represented Australia 14 times in rugby union between 1986 and 1988.

== Playing career ==
Leeds played junior rugby union with the Northmead club, Merrylands JRU and James Ruse Agricultural High School.

Joining the Parramatta Two Blues, Leeds played in the 1985 and 1986 premiership winning sides, and went on to play for Sydney, New South Wales and Australia in 1986. Leeds made three tours with the Wallabies, appearing in fourteen tests, and played in the 1987 Rugby World Cup.

Converting to rugby league, Leeds joined the Parramatta Eels for the 1989 season. He spent 3 years with the Eels, but failed to perform when played at centre or five-eighth. After a year spent with the Penrith Panthers, Leeds joined Wests from 1993 onwards.

Leeds was a player with deceptive pace and skill. He was "safe, reliable and a match-winner with the boot." He scored over 500 points for the Magpies, often in under-performing teams, before announcing his retirement in 1999. He is the fourth highest point-scorer for the club.

In 1997 Leeds returned to rugby union with England's Leicester Tigers, then coached by Bob Dwyer, he played 6 games for the club including 4 games in Premiership Rugby.

Leeds later joined the Wests Tigers as their physiotherapist and rehab manager, and did similar unpaid work with the Two Blues As of 2012, Leeds was the Wests Tigers' longest serving employee, having missed only one game since the club started in 2000.

== Sources ==
- Alan Whiticker & Glen Hudson (2007). The Encyclopedia of Rugby League Players. Wetherill Park, New South Wales: Gary Allen Pty Ltd. ISBN 978-1-877082-93-1.
