= Hunter Wildfires =

Australian rugby union club, based in Newcastle West, NSW

(Australia) Hunter Wildfires
- Union: Newcastle and Hunter Rugby Union
- Nickname: Wildfires
- Founded: 1869; 157 years ago
- Location: Newcastle West, New South Wales
- Region: Hunter Valley
- Ground: Newcastle No.2 Sportsground (Capacity: 5,000)
- Coach: Scott Coleman
- League: Shute Shield
- 2023: TBD

The Hunter Wildfires, (Note: Colloquially called the “Newcastle Wildfires”.) also known simply NHRU Wildfires, are an Australian rugby union club based in the New South Wales city of Newcastle, New South Wales. The club currently plays in the semi-professional competition the Shute Shield where they have been since the 2020 season. Formerly in the Shute Shield between 1995 and 1999, the Wildfires returned to the competition following various issues stemming from the COVID-19 pandemic. The Hunter Wildfires made their debut against Warringah on 1 April 1995 at Pittwater Park, Warriewood. The team lost 57–8, conceding nine tries. are the only team in the Shute Shield competition that is based outside of the Sydney area.

Established in 1869, the club has since become a representative club for Newcastle and the surrounding area. The Wildfires were given final approval to re-join the Shute Shield on 25 June 2020, after both the Newcastle and Hunter Rugby Union (NHRU) board and the local clubs approved of the decision. The club has never won a premiership.
