= Ian Robertson (rugby union, born 1951) =

- Born: Ian Jeffry Robertson; 26 November 1951 Sydney

Rugby union career
- Position: wing
International career
Years	Team	Apps	(Points)
1975	Wallabies	2	(8)

Ian Jeffry Robertson (born 26 November 1951) was a rugby union player who represented Australia.

Robertson, a wing, was born in Sydney and claimed a total of 2 international rugby caps for Australia. Robertson was also known by the nickname “Devil’s Elbow”.
