= Phil Clements =

Australian rugby union international

- Full name: Phillip Clements
- Born: 29 March 1952 (age 74) Goulburn, NSW, Australia

Rugby union career
- Position: Lock
International career
Years	Team	Apps	(Points)
1982	Australia	1	(0)

Phillip Clements (born 29 March 1952) is an Australian former rugby union international.

Clements, born in Goulburn, grew up playing rugby league as a back, until picking up rugby union during high school and establishing himself as a lock. He had the distinction of captaining Sydney Combined Second Division schools.

A Parramatta first-grade player, Clements didn't gain Wallabies selection until the age of 30 for the 1982 New Zealand tour, following good performances for the Sydney representative side. He was capped in the 3rd Test at Eden Park.

== See also ==
- List of Australia national rugby union players
