= Eastwood Rugby Club =

Australian rugby union club, based in Sydney

(Australia) Eastwood Rugby
- Full name: Eastwood District Rugby Union Football Club
- Nickname(s): The Woodies, Woods
- Founded: 1947
- Location: North West Sydney
- Ground(s): TG Millner Field, Marsfield, New South Wales
- Director of Rugby: Anthony Griffin
- Coach: 1st Grade: Anthony Griffin
- League: Sydney Rugby Union,
Team kit

Official website
- www.woods.rugby

Eastwood Rugby is the Premier Rugby Club covering North West Sydney and plays in the Sydney Premier Rugby competition.

The Eastwood District extends from the Parramatta River at Meadowbank to the Hawkesbury River at Wisemans Ferry. The Club currently plays at TG Millner Field. On 25 November 2020, the Club announced that it had secured approval for its new home ground at Fred Caterson Reserve, Gilbert Road Castle Hill.

== Honours ==
Shute Shield Titles: 1999, 2002, 2003, 2011, 2014, 2015

- Australian Club Champions: (2) 2015, 2016

== Club history ==
Rugby has been played in the Northern Districts of Sydney since the latter part of the 19th century. In the 1890s a number of local sides existed, playing at a variety of venues, the main one being Brush Farm in Eastwood. Interestingly, a Rugby Union Club was also formed in Castle Hill around this time (in 1894) and they also played in Blue and White.

With the outbreak of the Great War, senior rugby was suspended with many of the players enlisting, a number paying the supreme sacrifice.

Following World War 1, the strength of Rugby in Eastwood and in Epping was centred around the respective Young Men's Institutes which fielded junior and senior sides in the Suburban Competition. At this time, Epping played at Epping Oval and Eastwood played at Eastwood Oval. Epping won the Kentwell Cup in 1926 and Eastwood won the Burke Cup in 1927.

Following further success in the 1930s, momentum was building to seek admission into the District Competition. The outbreak of the Second World War caused a deferral of this plan until 1946 when a successful application was made for inclusion in the District Competition from the beginning of the 1947 Season. This was following the amalgamation of the Eastwood and Epping Clubs. As a result, the Eastwood District Rugby Union Football Club was formed and it has played in the Sydney District Competition ever since. Initially the new club's home ground was the Top Oval in Eastwood. In 1963, EDRUFC moved its home ground to TG Millner at Marsfield.

The Club has won a number of minor grade and Colts competitions over the years but did not win the 1st-grade major premiership trophy until 1999. In an historic win, the Club won the Shute Shield for the first time by defeating Sydney University in the Grand Final.

Since formation, the Club has produced numerous players who have played International rugby. Eastwood has a strong junior base which has won many NSW Junior Rugby Union State Championships.

== Junior Clubs ==
Dural
Northern Barbarians
North Rocks
Redfield Rugby (minis only)
Ryde Rugby
Central Eastwood
Box Hill Boxers

== Over 35s ==
The Charcoals (the "burnt out Woods") for players over 35 was formed in 1983 and have played ever since. They have made many overseas tours and are regular participants in tournaments all over the country.

== Eastwood players who have at some time played some level of International rugby ==
Name	International Country	International Year	International Type	Club when Selected	Notes
Adrian McDonald	AUS	1983	Wallaby*	Randwick	
Alan Skinner	AUS	1969	Wallaby	Eastwood	
Andrew Cairns	AUS	1990	Wallaby*	Eastwood	
Ben Alexander	AUS	2008	Wallaby	Northern Suburbs (Syd)	
Benn Robinson	AUS	2006	Wallaby	Eastwood	
Bill Cavubati	FIJI	1995	International		
Bill Young	AUS	2000	Wallaby	Eastwood	
Brett Papworth	AUS	1985	Wallaby	Eastwood	
Charlie Cale	AUS	2024	Wallaby	Uni-Norths (Canberra)	
Daniel Manu	AUS	1995	Wallaby	Eastwood	
Darren Junee	AUS	1989	Wallaby	Eastwood	
Dick Taylor	AUS	1966	Wallaby*	Eastwood	
Doug Keller	AUS	1947	Wallaby	Drummoyne	
Graeme Bond	AUS		Wallaby	Northern Suburbs (Syd)	
Ian Robertson	AUS	1975	Wallaby	Eastwood	
Ian Williams	AUS	1987	Wallaby	Eastwood	
Ian Williams	JAP	1993	International		
Jai Ayoub	CRO		International	Eastwood	
James McGregor	AUS	2023	7s	Eastwood	
James Stannard	AUS		7s		
Jeff Reid	CAN	2003	International	Eastwood	
Jeremy Paul	AUS	1998	Wallaby	Canberra Vikings	
John (Jack) Shute	AUS	1922	Wallaby	Wests	The first Wallaby from the Eastwood District. Living in Rutledge Street at the time but playing for the local district Club - Western Suburbs, Jack Shute was selected for NSW in games that since 1986 have been recognised as Test Matches. Eastwood's First Life Member and President.
John Bain	AUS	1953	Wallaby*	Eastwood	JG Bain was the Club's first Wallaby.
John Ballesty	AUS	1968	Wallaby	Eastwood	
Justin Harrison	AUS	2001	Wallaby	Canberra Vikings	
Ken McCurrach	AUS	1973	Wallaby*	Eastwood	
Lachie Anderson	AUS	2017	7s	Eastwood	
Lachie Anderson	AUS	2023	Australia A	Eastwood	
Lachie Turner	AUS	2008	Wallaby	Eastwood	
Leroy Houston	AUS		Wallaby	Eastwood	
Mark Nawaqanitawase	AUS	2022	Wallaby	Eastwood	
Marty Roebuck	AUS	1991	Wallaby	Eastwood	
Matt Dunning	AUS	2003	Wallaby	Eastwood	
Matt Gonzalez	AUS	2022	7s	Eastwood	
Matt Hodgson	AUS		Wallaby	Eastern Suburbs (Syd)	
Matt Mostyn	IRE	1999	International		
Matthew Burke	AUS	1993	Wallaby	Eastwood	
Michael Icely	AUS	2022	7s	Eastwood	
Michael Kovacic	SVN		International	Eastwood	
Michael Mathers	AUS	1980	Wallaby	Eastwood	
Mitch Lees	ENG		England A		Eastwood player who moved to the UK and was selected for England A.
Nathan Spooner	AUS	1999	Wallaby	Eastwood/Brothers QLD	
Nic Dolly	ENG	2021	International		Eastwood colt moved to the UK and was selected for England.
Nic White	AUS	2013	Wallaby	Queanbeyan	
Peter FitzSimons	AUS	1989	Wallaby	University (Syd)	
Peter Miller	AUS	1997	7s	Eastwood	
Phil Clements	AUS		Wallaby	Parramatta	
Richard Harry	AUS	1996	Wallaby	University (Syd)	
Rod Moore	AUS	1999	Wallaby	Eastwood	
Ross Cullen	AUS	1966	Wallaby*	Eastern Districts (Brisbane)	Eastwood 2nd Grade Hooker (behind Dick Taylor) moved to Brisbane and was selected for 1966 Wallaby tour.
Sam Cordingley	AUS	2000	Wallaby	Eastwood	
Scott Fava	AUS	2005	Wallaby	Eastwood	
Scott Gourley	AUS	1988	Wallaby	Eastwood	
Scott Staniforth	AUS	1999	Wallaby	Eastwood	
Sean Mooney	AUS	1976	7s	Eastwood	
Sione Tahaafe	Tonga	1987	International		
Steve Tuynman	AUS	1982	Wallaby	Eastwood	
Stuart Gregory	AUS	1968	Wallaby	University (Qld)	
Tane Edmed	AUS	2024	Wallaby	Eastwood	
Tannous Ferris	LBN		International	Eastwood	
Tim Anstee	AUS	2016	7s	Eastwood	
Tim Kelaher	AUS		Wallaby	Randwick	
Tom Pauling	AUS	1936	Wallaby	Wests	Around 1930 TP Pauling played sub-districts for Eastwood in the Burke Cup. After being near to Wallaby selection the following year he had to wait until 1936 to make his debut when playing for Western Suburbs. He was coached at Eastwood by JL (Jack) Shute.
Van Humphries	AUS	2010	Wallaby*	Souths (Brisbane)	

*uncapped

== Current provincial representatives ==
Super Rugby

- Lachie Anderson
- Tane Edmed
- Charlie Cale

== Life Members ==
JL Shute (deceased)	JK McGregor (deceased)	MC Chapman
Col. TG Millner (deceased)	JS Millner (deceased)	LJ Ferrari
HA Gunns (deceased)	JT Ramm (deceased)	GM Landon (deceased)
ALC Irving (deceased)	DM Jackson (deceased)	RJ Shield (deceased)
WM Levy (deceased)	BR Taylor	NJ Dickie
GE Mills (deceased)	WFL Papworth (deceased)	B Budd
GTB Palmer (deceased)	FJ Tyrell (deceased)	IM Williams
KF Smallwood (deceased)	JC Cullen (deceased)	PR Robinson
JE Haynes (deceased)	K Milne (deceased)	
JG Bain (deceased)	RG Clare	
