= Penrith Rugby Club =

Australian rugby union team, based in Penrith NSW

Penrith Emus
- Full name: Penrith Rugby Club
- Nickname: Emus
- Founded: 1965; 61 years ago
- Location: Penrith, Sydney, Australia
- Ground(s): Nepean Rugby Park, Penrith
Team kit

Penrith Rugby Club, known as the Emus, is an Australian rugby union club based in Penrith, a western suburb of Sydney, New South Wales. The club was formed in 1965 as Nepean and renamed Penrith in 1981. Penrith was elevated from the NSW Suburban competition to the Shute Shield in 1995, where they played until being removed midway through the 2018 season. Sydney Rugby Union chairman David Begg said the Emus had failed to 'meet the standards set for all clubs to compete at the premiership level'. The club was readmitted to the competition for the 2020 season before being dropped again ahead of the 2022 season.

The Emus played in the Canberra competition for the 2022 and 2023 seasons. The club returned to the NSW Suburban Rugby Union competition in 2025.

== Club information ==
COMPETITION HISTORY:

- 1965: NSW Suburban Rugby Union
- 1966–1980: Sydney Rugby Union–2nd Division
- 1981–1983: Sydney Rugby Union–3rd Division
- 1984–1992: Sydney Rugby Union–2nd Division
- 1993–1994: NSW Suburban Rugby Union–1st Division
- 1995–2018: NSWRU Shute Shield
- 2020–2021: NSWRU Shute Shield
- 2022–2023: ACT John I Dent Cup
- 2025–pres: NSW Suburban Rugby Union

PREMIERSHIPS:

Sydney Rugby Union-3rd Division

- 1st Grade: 1981, 82, 83
- 2nd Grade: 1981, 82
- 3rd Grade: 1982
- 4th Grade: NIL
- Colts (U20): NIL
- Club Championship: 1983

NSW Suburban Rugby Union-1st Division

- 1st Grade (W.H. Kentwell Cup): NIL
- 2nd Grade (George Burke Memorial Cup): NIL
- 3rd Grade (H.W. Whiddon Cup): 1994
- 4th Grade (H.A. Judd Cup): 1993
- 5th Grade (Sutherland Cup): NIL
- Colts (U21) (Barbour Cup): NIL
- Club Championship (Bruce Graham Shield): NIL
