= Western Sydney Two Blues =

Australian rugby union club, based in Parramatta, NSW

Australia
- Full name: Western Sydney "Two Blues" Rugby
- Nickname: Two Blues
- Founded: 1934; 92 years ago
- Location: Parramatta, New South Wales, Australia
- Ground: Eric Tweedale Stadium (Capacity: 5,000 (750 seats))
- Coach: Travis Church
- Captain: Rodney Iona
- League: Shute Shield
- General Manager: Craig Morgan
Team kit

Official website
- www.twobluesrugby.com.au

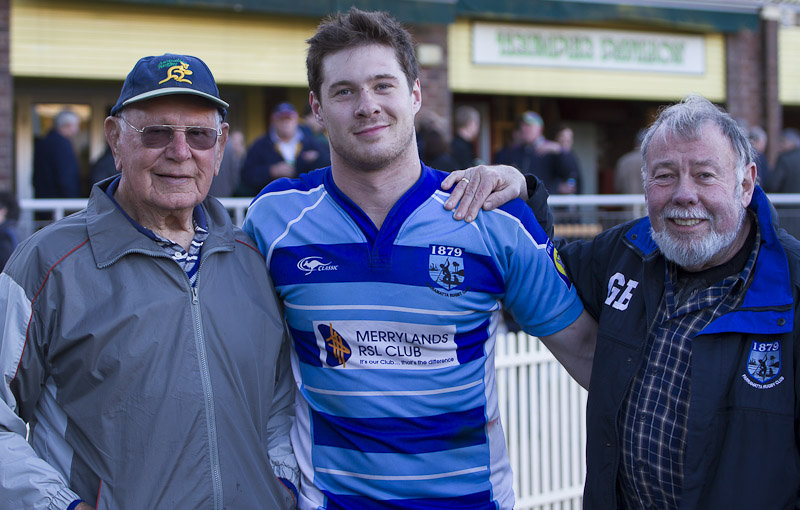
Two Blues captain Andrew Cox, achieving 100 first grade games in 2011, is congratulated by President Geoff Baldwin and the then oldest living former Wallaby Eric Tweedale

Western Sydney Two Blues Rugby, formerly Parramatta Two Blues Rugby, is a rugby union club based in Parramatta, which is commonly regarded as the second CBD of Sydney, Australia. While the town first had a rugby union club formed in 1879, and a Parramatta 'Reds' team in the 1899 Sydney premiership, the Parramatta District Rugby Union Club was formed in 1934 joining the Shute Shield competition under the New South Wales Rugby Union (NSWRU). The club has produced nineteen Wallabies over the years, starting with the great Bill Cerutti in 1936 through to the club's current, Rodney Iona. To date Parramatta has played in eight First grade grand finals.

== History ==
The roots of the playing of rugby union in Parramatta lie in the 19th century with the formation of a Parramatta FC (or Cumberland) in 1879 which featured regularly in Sydney competitions. Also the The King's School in Parramatta helped found the NSWRU in 1874 and provided many prominent footballers.

As with most other rugby union clubs in Sydney in 1900, the Parramatta FC ('Reds') that was in the 1899 Seniors (first grade) competition was made defunct to make way for the new district clubs scheme.

The Parramatta area spent the pre-war (1900-14) as the "third wheel" of the Ashfield and Burwood centred Western Suburbs District Rugby Union Club, and while some matches were played at Cumberland Oval, there was no Parramatta presence in the 1920s and early 1930s, until late in 1933 when it was granted entry as the Parramatta District Rugby Union Club for the coming 1934 season.

The Sydney Morning Herald of 16 February 1934 reported "Parramatta will be represented for the first time in the Rugby Union competition this year...the formation of the district club having been completed...The uniform decided on is royal and sky blue broken stripes, black trousers, royal blue socks with sky blue tops..."

The club has since 1934 never been relegated from the top grade competition. The Parramatta club contested its first Grand Final in 1945, a 9-3 defeat to Sydney University. The 1950s and 1960s were lean years but the development of a strong junior competition assured a sharp improvement in standards.

Former Wallaby Rod Phelps took over as captain-coach in 1971 and for three years he improved Parramatta's standing in the rugby fraternity. Grand Final appearances in 1974 and 1975 showed that the club was well on its way to becoming a force to be reckoned with.

Finally with the influx of young players in this period Parramatta won its initial First Grade premiership in 1977, a 17–9 victory against Randwick under coach Peter Fenton. The Two Blues had waited 44 years to achieve victory, but the wait was worthwhile.

The Club then played in the 1979 and 1984 grand finals going down to Randwick on both occasions, but revenge would be sweet in 1985 and 1986 when the underdogs from Sydney's west succeeded in beating the Galloping Greens to win consecutive premierships under coach Paul Dalton.

In 2018 the club identified the need to evolve and deliver greater opportunity for the game of rugby in Greater Western Sydney. The clubs' members originate from all across the West with the club making the strategic decision to re-brand from Parramatta Rugby Club to the Western Sydney Two Blues to better reflect our presence in the competition, our members and playing group and to take lead for the game of rugby in Western Sydney.

Four of Parramatta's favourite sons switched to League with success. Ken Kearney (a Wallaby in 1947 and 1948), Ray Price (a Wallaby between 1974 and 1976), Tony Melrose who played for the Wallabies in 1978 and 1979, and Andrew Leeds who played for his country between 1986 and 1988 all wore the Two Blues with pride and then switched to the Parramatta Eels. Leeds and Peter Kay, capped against England in 1988, were the club's most recent Wallabies until Tatafu Polota-Nau played two Tests on the Wallabies 2005 Tour against England and Ireland.

== Club information ==
Parramatta Two Blues logo pre-2011

Club Name: Western Sydney Two Blues
Nickname: Two Blues
Founded: 1934
Home-stadium: Eric Tweedle Stadium
Uniform colours: Navy-Blue and Sky-Blue
Premiership Titles: 3 titles: 1977, 1985, 1986

== Office holders ==
As of 2024:

President: Greg Cummings
General Manager: Randy Basra
Director of Rugby: Sailosi Tagicakibau
Head Coach: Travis Church
1st Grade Captain: Rodney Iona

== Current squad ==
2014 Parramatta Rugby Squad - Shute Shield
Props: (Australia) Nick Blacklock; (Samoa) Simon Lemalu; (Australia) Louis Musson; (Samoa) Gerrard Faitotua; (Fiji) Joe Dakuitoga; Hookers: (Australia) Tatafu Polota-Nau; (New Zealand) Liu Taitavake; (Australia) Myles Hunkin; (Australia) Matthew Borg; (Australia) Aaron Blacklock; Locks: (Canada) Evan Olmstead; (Australia) Adam Coleman; (New Zealand) Sakaria Noa; (Australia) Peter Brush; (Australia) Joshua Kron; (Tonga) Ryan Aniesko; (Samoa) Joey Wrampling	Loose forwards: (Australia) Andrew Cox (c); (Australia) Daniel Tamone; (Australia) Maile Latukefu; (Australia) Rodney Ma’a; (New Zealand) Josh Kaifa; (New Zealand) Matthew White; (New Zealand) Sililo Savea; (Samoa) Jacob Masoe; (Tonga) Aisea Namoa; Halfbacks: (Australia) Kaleb Rech; (Australia) Chris Nay; (Australia) Daniel Tully; Midfielders: (Australia) Sam Yakapo; (New Zealand) Tom Woods; (Australia) Dominic Graham; (Australia) Dion Taumata	Back Three-Quarters: (Fiji) Taqele Naiyaravoro; (Australia) Tui Fa’asisila; (Australia) Daniel Yakapo; (Australia) Tomu Mataika (c); (Australia) Lani Tiatia; Alex Samoa; (New Zealand) Larry Hermens; (Samoa) Justin Paulo; (c) Denotes team captain: Most players are capable of playing; multiple positions. - Squad only include players who have been named in a starting 15 or reserves bench.

== Records ==
=== Honours ===
Grand Finalists and Premiers

- 2000 4th Grade
- 1998 5th Grade
- 1997 5th Grade PREMIERS
- 1992 4th Grade Colts
- 1987 1st Grade Colts
- 1986 1st Grade PREMIERS - d. Randwick 30-12
- 1985 1st Grade PREMIERS - d. Randwick 19-12
- 1984 1st Grade (Randwick defeated Parramatta)
- 1984 3rd Grade

1984   1st Grade Colts Premiers Def Sydney Uni 

- 1982 3rd Grade
- 1982 2nd Grade Colts
- 1981 2nd Grade Colts
- 1981 3rd Grade Colts PREMIERS
- 1979 1st Grade (Randwick defeated Parramatta)
- 1979 4th Grade PREMIERS
- 1979 1st Grade Colts PREMIERS (Joint)
- 1978 2nd Grade Colts
- 1977 1st Grade PREMIERS - d. Randwick 17-9
- 1977 5th Grade
- 1976 3rd Grade PREMIERS
- 1976 5th Grade
- 1976 1st Grade Colts
- 1976 2nd Grade Colts PREMIERS
- 1975 1st Grade (Northern Suburbs defeated Parramatta)
- 1975 1st Grade Colts
- 1975 2nd Grade Colts
- 1974 1st Grade (Randwick defeated Parramatta)
- 1945 1st Grade (Sydney University defeated Parramatta)

=== Representative players ===
International men's teams 15-a-side players:

Australia	Bob Brown	Debut: 1975-05-24 vs. England in Sydney Aus / fullback / (Wallaby 575)
Australia	Bill Cerutti	Australian Rep in 17 Tests & made famous the number 13 Jersey in the 1920s-30s.
Australia	Phil Clements	Debut: 1982-09-11 vs. New Zealand in Auckland, NZ / Lock / (Wallaby 631)
Australia	Adam Coleman	Debut: 2016
Australia	Patrick Cooper	Played for Wallabies is 1965
Australia	Peter Kay	Debut: 1988-06-12 vs. England in Sydney, Aus / Prop / (Wallaby 669)
Australia	Ken Kearney	Debut: 1947-06-14 vs. New Zealand in Brisbane, Aus / Hooker / (Wallaby 346)
Australia	Martin Knight	Debut: 1978-06-11 vs. Wales in Brisbane, NZ / centre / (Wallaby 593)
Australia	Andrew Leeds	Debut: 1986-09-06 vs. New Zealand in Auckland, NZ / fullback / (Wallaby 658)
Australia	Mick Martin	Debut: 1980-05-24 vs. Fiji in Suva, Fiji / wing / (Wallaby 612)
Australia	Adrian McDonald	Played for Wallabies in 1983
Australia	Tony Melrose	Debut: 1978-09-09 vs. New Zealand in Auckland, NZ / Flyhalf / (Wallaby 601)
Australia	Taqele Naiyaravoro	Debut: 2015
Australia	Rod Phelps	Debut: 1955-09-03 vs. New Zealand in Dunedin, NZ / fullback / (Wallaby 412)
Australia	Tatafu Polota-Nau	Debut: 2005-11-12 vs England in Twickenham, England / Hooker / (Wallaby 806)
Australia	Don Price	Forward Toured Fiji with the Australian Rugby Union Team in 1980
Australia	Ray Price	Debut: 1974-05-25 vs. New Zealand in Sydney, Aus / Flanker / (Wallaby 573)
Australia	Eric Tweedale	Debut: 1946-09-14 vs. New Zealand in Dunedin, NZ / Prop / (Wallaby 336)
Australia	Malcolm van Gelder	1958
Australia	Lance Walker	Debut: 1982-08-28 vs. New Zealant in Wellington, NZ / Hooker / (Wallaby 629)
Australia	Stan Wickham	Played for Wallabies in 1901 to 1906
Tonga	Damien Fakafanua	Centre/wing for Tonga in 2012 Pacific Nations Cup
Tonga	John Fonua	Debut: 2002-06-15 vs. Samoa at Nuku A'lofa, Tonga / wing / (Tonga Player 472)
Tonga	Sitiveni Mafi	Lock, Flanker for Tonga Debut in the 2010 Pacific nations Cup
Tonga	Sateki Tuipulotu	Debut:1994-07-17 vs. Fiji at Nuku A'lofa, Tonga / fullback / (Tonga Player 368)
Fiji	Taniela Rawaqa	Fullback/Flyhalf for Fiji. The Second Highest point scorer in Pacific Nations Cup at 103 Points
Samoa	Fa'avaivai Tanoa'i	Debut: 1996-07-13 Vs. Tonga at Apia, Samoa / Flyhalf
Samoa	Lua Vailoaloa	Halfback for the Manu Samoa in 2011 Pacific Nations Cup and non travelling reserve in 2011 Rugby World Cup
New Zealand	Sosene Anesi	Debut: 2005 vs. Fiji in Albany / fullback, Wing / (All-Black 1054)
Canada	Evan Olmstead	Debut: 2011 Canada U20 Vs. Georgia in Tbilisi, Georgia / 2nd Row/Flanker/No.8
Philippines	Oliver Saunders	Current Philippines Rugby player and Top point scorer (Flyhalf)
Philippines	Kenneth Stern	Current Philippines Rugby Player (Winger)

Other players signed to professional clubs:

Australia	Daniel Yakapo	Rugby Viadana
Italy	Steven Bortolussi	Petrarca Padova Rugby
Samoa	Iese Leota	Stade Montois
Samoa	Chris Seuteni	CA Brive
Tonga	Sitiveni Mafi	Western Force

International women's teams players:

Australia	Alex Sulusi	Australian women's national rugby union team
Australia	Chloe Butler	Australian women's national rugby union team
Australia	Nita Maynard	Australian women's national rugby union team
Australia	Hanna Sio	Australian women's national rugby union team (sevens)

Other Australian team representatives:

Australia	Daniel Yakapo	Australian national rugby union team (sevens)
Australia	Andrew Vatuvei	Australian Schoolboys Rugby Union
Australia	Andrew Cox	Australian Barbarians Rugby Team
Australia	Josh Kaifa	Australian Barbarians Rugby Team
Australia	Mika Polota Nau	Australian Barbarians Rugby Team
Australia	Rodney Ma'a	Australian Barbarians Rugby Team

=== Life members ===
- Greg Baker
- Bruce Coggins
- Denis Garlick
- Frank Lawson
- Jack Liversedge
- Allan Minett
- Roger O'Neill
- Morris Sutton
- Eric Tweedale
- Hilton "Snow" Elliott
- Janice Dewberry
- John Aquilina
- Patrick Dunne
- Peter Thompson
- Gary Hudson
- Geoff Baldwin
- Moala Polota-Nau
- Andrew Cox
- Tatafu Polota-Nau
- Peter Gillett
- Anthony 'Santa' Privett
- Ian Clarke
- Joe Scott

=== 200 club ===
The following players have played over 200 Grade games for Parramatta Two Blues

- David Bird
- Matthew Campton
- Pat Cooper
- Ray Elliot
- Graham Galloway
- Glen Goddard
- Greg Hackett
- Dominic King
- Ivan Mann
- Gregg Melrose
- David Strong
- Kel Black
- Peter Campton
- Mick Donaldson
- Paul Evans
- John Gardiner
- Andrew Gokel
- Terry Heffernan
- Peter Koen
- Warren Martin
- Allan Minnett
- Craig Minnett
- Glen Stuart
- Tim Calhalane
- Bruce Coggins
- Hilton "Snow" Elliott
- Geoff Ferris
- Dennis Garlick
- Jon Gorman
- Allan Holman
- Frank Lehman
- Peter McDonald
- Andrew Campton
- Joe Collins
- Kevin Elliott
- Peter Ferris
- Paul Gledhill
- Noel Grant
- Peter Kay
- David Mann
- Keith McKinney
- Steven Simpson

== Juniors ==
=== Parramatta junior clubs ===
- Blacktown JRUFC
- Dundas Valley JRUFC
- Hills JRUFC
- Merrylands JRUFC
- Norwest JRUFC
- Liverpool JRUFC
- Hawkesbury Valley JRUFC

=== Notable junior players ===
- (Samoa) Jeremy Su'a - Canterbury Crusaders
- (Australia) Sam Wykes - Western Force
- (Australia) Jamal Idris - Gold Coast Titans
- (Fiji) Sisa Waqa - Melbourne Storm
- (Australia) Jorge Taufua - Manly Sea Eagles
- (Australia) Leon Bott - Retired
- (Australia) Tatafu Polota-Nau - ACT Brumbies, NSW Waratahs, Western Force, Leicester Tigers
- (Australia) Sitiveni 'Steve' Mafi - NSW Waratahs, Leicester, Western Force, Castres, London Irish
- Hadley Tonga - Australia national rugby sevens team
- (Australia) Waiaria Ellis - NSW Waratahs Women
- (Australia) Boston Fakafanua - Western Force
