= Sydney Opera House =

Performing arts centre in Australia

- Official logo

- View of the Sydney Opera House from Milsons Point

- Location within Sydney Location within New South Wales Location within Australia

General information
- Status: Completed
- Type: Performing arts centre
- Architectural style: Expressionist
- Location: Bennelong Point, Sydney, Australia
- Coordinates: 33.85681°S 151.21514°E
- Elevation: 4 m (13 ft)
- Current tenants: Australian Chamber Orchestra; Bangarra Dance Theatre; Bell Shakespeare; Opera Australia; Sydney Philharmonia Choirs; Sydney Symphony Orchestra; Sydney Theatre Company; The Australian Ballet
- Construction started: 1 March 1959
- Opened: 20 October 1973
- Cost: A$102 million, equivalent to A$1082 million in 2022
- Client: Government of New South Wales
- Owner: Government of New South Wales

Height
- Height: 65 m (213 ft)

Dimensions
- Other dimensions: length 183 m (600 ft); width 120 m (394 ft); area 1.8 ha (4.4 acres)

Technical details
- Structural system: Concrete frame & precast concrete ribbed roof

Design and construction
- Architects: Jørn Utzon; Peter Hall
- Structural engineer: Ove Arup & Partners
- Main contractor: Civil & Civic (level 1), MR Hornibrook (level 2 and 3 and interiors)

Other information
- Seating capacity: Concert Hall 2,679; Joan Sutherland Theatre 1,507; Drama Theatre 544; Playhouse 398; The Studio 400; Utzon Room 210; Total 5,738

Website
- sydneyoperahouse.com

UNESCO World Heritage Site
- Type: Cultural
- Criteria: i
- Designated: 2007 (31st session)
- Reference no.: 166
- Region: Oceania

Australian National Heritage List
- Type: Historic
- Criteria: a, b, e, f, g, h
- Designated: 12 July 2005; 21 years ago
- Reference no.: 105738

New South Wales Heritage Register
- Type: Built
- Criteria: a, b, c, d, e, f, g
- Designated: 3 December 2003; 22 years ago
- Reference no.: 01685

References
- Coordinates

The Sydney Opera House is a multi-venue performing arts centre in Sydney, New South Wales, Australia. Located on the foreshore of Sydney Harbour, it is widely regarded as one of the world's most famous and distinctive buildings, and a masterpiece of 20th-century architecture.

Designed by Danish architect Jørn Utzon and completed by an Australian architectural team headed by Peter Hall, the building was formally opened by Queen Elizabeth II on 20 October 1973, 16 years after Utzon's 1957 selection as winner of an international design competition. The Government of New South Wales, led by the premier, Joseph Cahill, authorised work to begin in 1958 with Utzon directing construction. The government's decision to build Utzon's design is often overshadowed by circumstances that followed, including cost and scheduling overruns as well as the architect's ultimate resignation.

The building and its surrounds occupy the whole of Bennelong Point on Sydney Harbour, between Sydney Cove and Farm Cove, adjacent to the Sydney central business district, Royal Botanic Garden, and near to the Sydney Harbour Bridge.

The building comprises multiple performance venues, which together host over 1,800 performances annually, attended by more than 1.4 million people. Performances are presented by numerous performing artists, with many resident companies such as Opera Australia, the Sydney Theatre Company and the Sydney Symphony Orchestra. As one of the most popular visitor attractions in Australia, the site is visited by more than ten million people annually, and approximately 350,000 visitors take a guided tour of the building each year. The building is managed by the Sydney Opera House Trust, an agency of the New South Wales State Government.

In 2007, the Sydney Opera House became a UNESCO World Heritage Site, having been listed on the (now defunct) Register of the National Estate since 1980, the National Trust of Australia register since 1983, the City of Sydney Heritage Inventory since 2000, the New South Wales State Heritage Register since 2003, and the Australian National Heritage List since 2005. The Opera House was also a finalist in the New 7 Wonders of the World campaign list.

== Description ==
The facility features a modern expressionist design, with a series of large precast concrete "shells", each composed of sections of a sphere of 75.2 metres (246 ft 8.6 in) radius, forming the roofs of the structure, set on a monumental podium. The building covers 1.8 hectares (4.4 acres) of land and is 183 m (600 ft) long and 120 m (394 ft) wide at its widest point. It is supported on 588 concrete piers sunk as much as 25 m (82 ft) below sea level. The highest roof point is 67 metres above sea-level which is the same height as that of a 22-storey building. The roof is made of 2,194 pre-cast concrete sections, which weigh up to 15 tonnes each.

Although the roof structures are commonly referred to as "shells" (as in this article), they are precast concrete panels supported by precast concrete ribs, not shells in a strictly structural sense. Though the shells appear uniformly white from a distance, they actually feature a subtle chevron pattern composed of 1,056,006 tiles in two colours: glossy white and matte cream. The tiles were manufactured by the Swedish company Höganäs AB which generally produced stoneware tiles for the paper-mill industry.

Apart from the tile of the shells and the glass curtain walls of the foyer spaces, the building's exterior is largely clad with aggregate panels composed of pink granite quarried at Tarana. Significant interior surface treatments also include off-form concrete, Australian white birch plywood supplied from Wauchope in northern New South Wales, and brush box glulam.

=== Performance venues and facilities ===
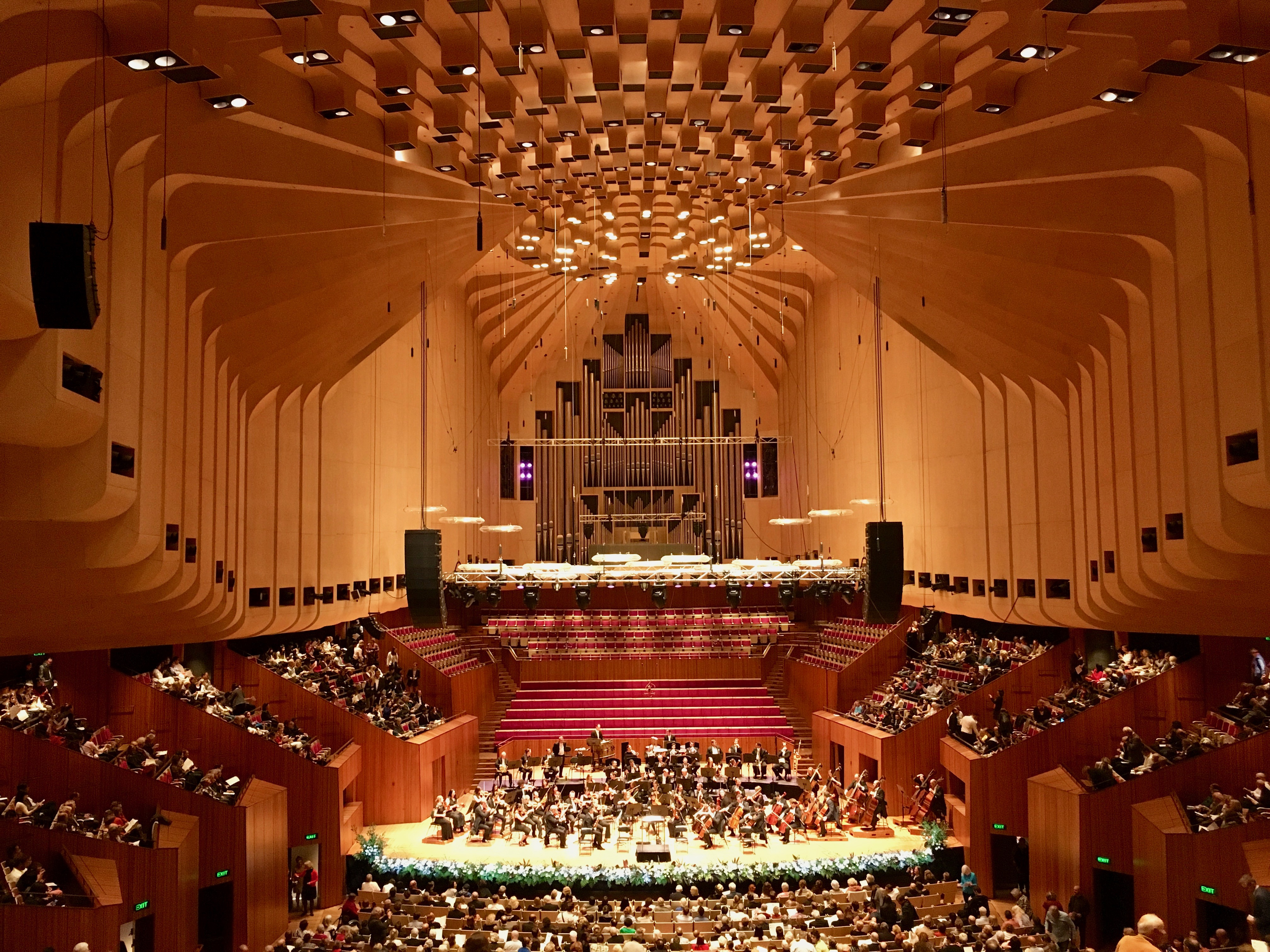
The main Concert Hall

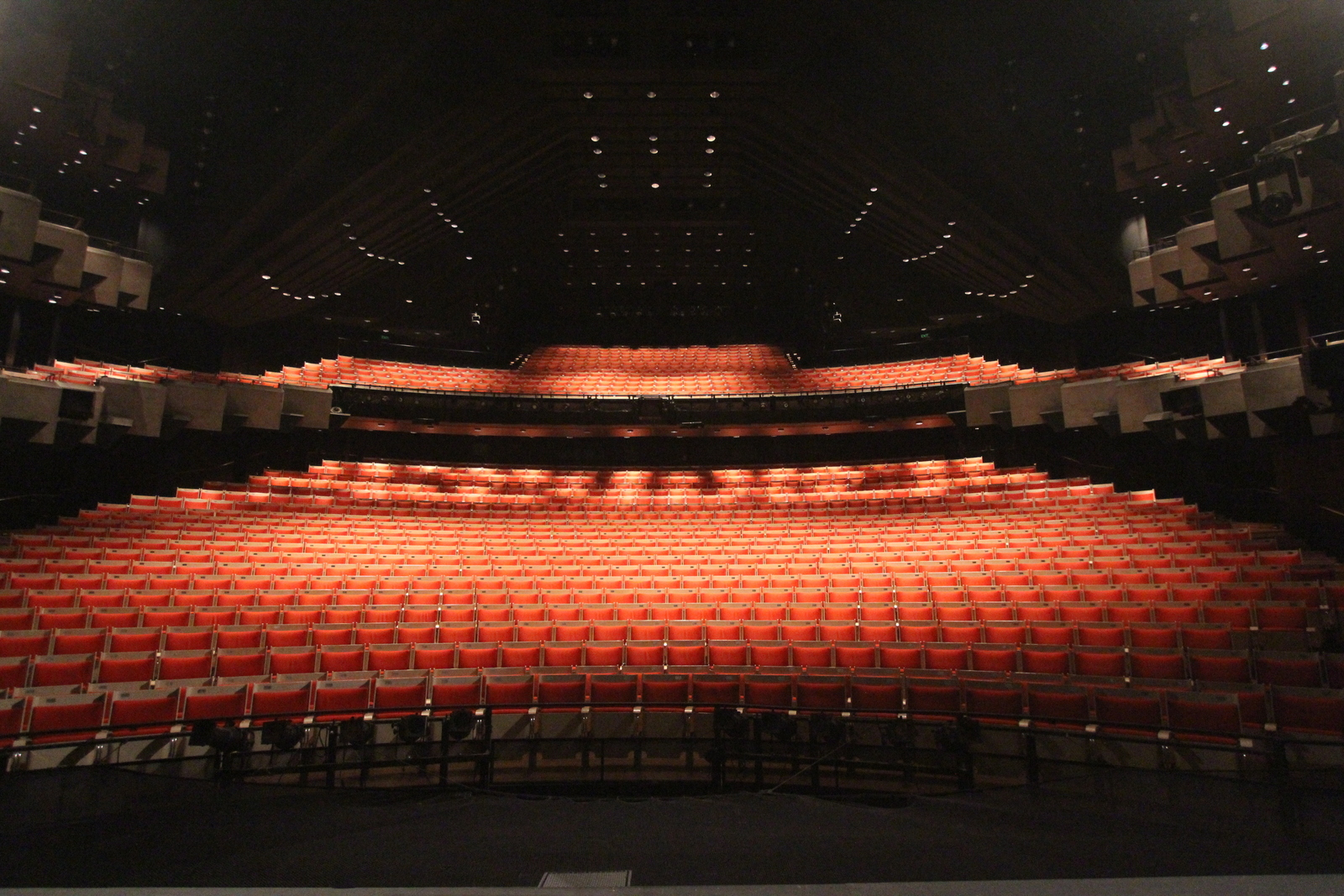
Joan Sutherland Theatre interior

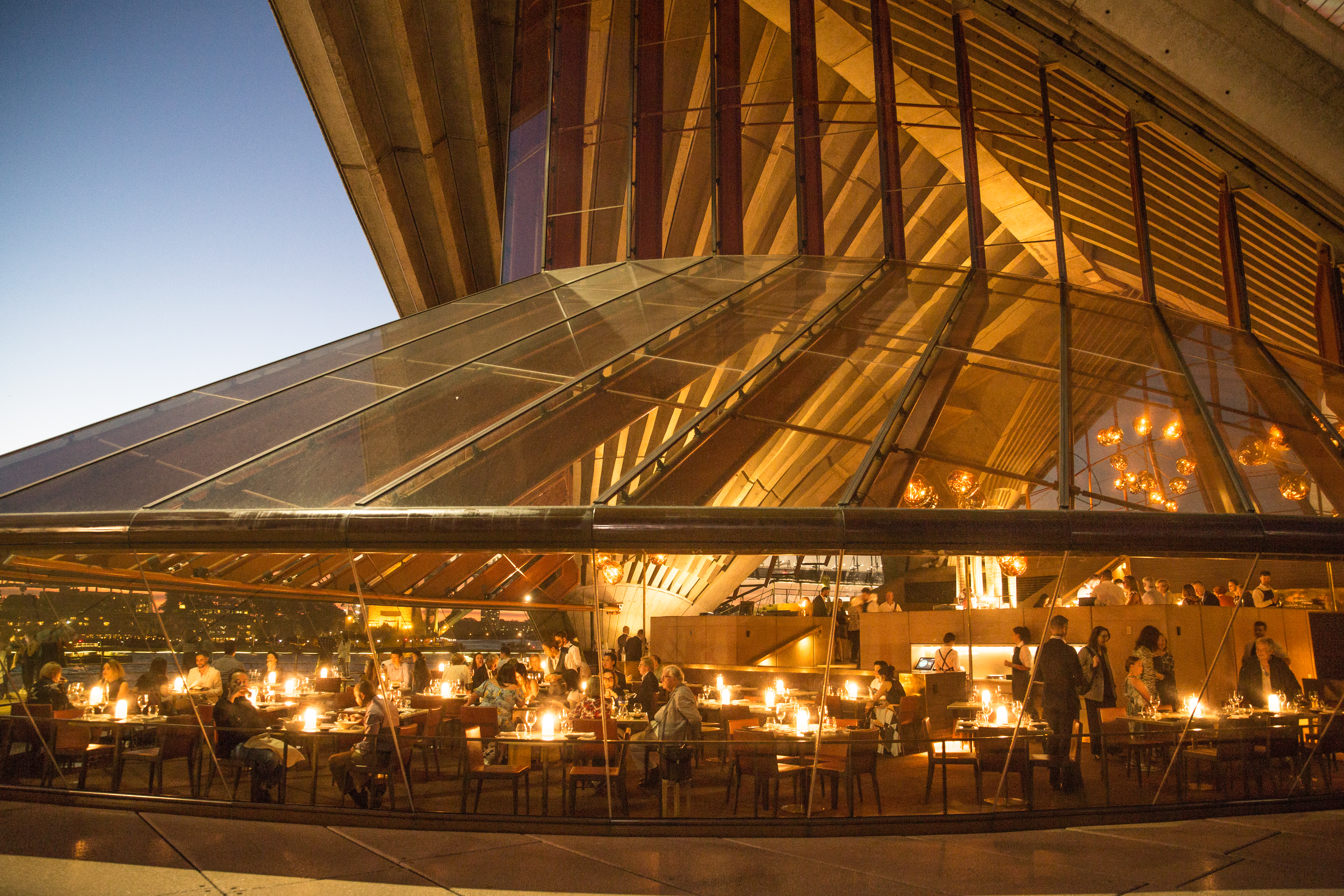
The Bennelong Restaurant, located at the southernmost sail

The Sydney Opera House includes a number of performance venues:

- Concert Hall: With 2,679 seats, the home of the Sydney Symphony Orchestra and used by a large number of other concert presenters. It contains the Sydney Opera House Grand Organ, the largest mechanical tracker action organ in the world, with over 10,000 pipes.
- Joan Sutherland Theatre: A proscenium theatre with 1,507 seats, the Sydney home of Opera Australia and The Australian Ballet. Until 17 October 2012 it was known as the Opera Theatre.
- Drama Theatre: A proscenium theatre with 544 seats, used by the Sydney Theatre Company and other dance and theatrical presenters.
- Playhouse: A non-proscenium end-stage theatre with 398 seats.
- Studio: A flexible space with 280 permanent seats (some of which can be folded up) and a maximum capacity of 400, depending on configuration.
- Utzon Room: A small multi-purpose venue for parties, corporate functions and small productions (such as chamber music performances).
- Yallamundi Rooms: A function space hosting up to 400 people, often used for weddings or business conferences.
- Outdoor Forecourt: A flexible open-air venue with a wide range of configuration options, including the possibility of utilising the Monumental Steps as audience seating, used for a range of community events and major outdoor performances.

== History ==
=== Origins of the project ===
==== Site selection ====
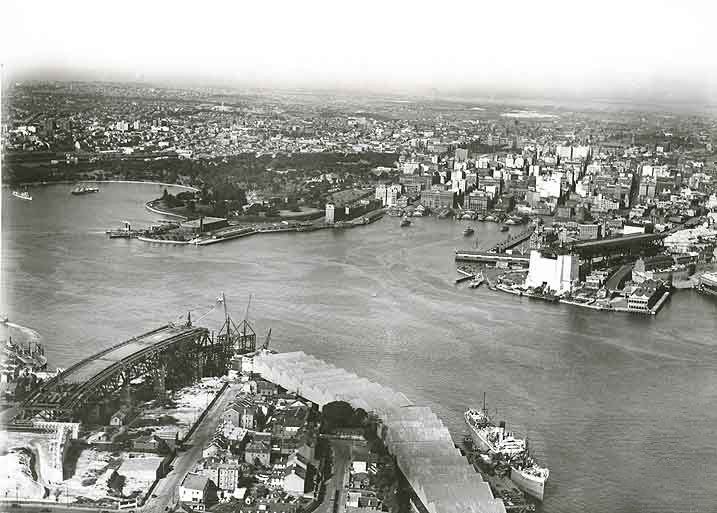
Bennelong Point with tram depot in the 1920s (top left-hand side of photograph), during the building of Sydney Harbour Bridge (foreground)

Planning began in the late 1940s when Eugene Goossens, the Chief Conductor of the Sydney Symphony Orchestra and Director of the New South Wales State Conservatorium of Music, lobbied for a suitable venue for opera and orchestral performance. The Sydney Symphony Orchestra's performance home, the Sydney Town Hall, was not considered large enough. By 1954, Goossens succeeded in gaining the support of New South Wales Premier Joseph Cahill, who called for designs for a dedicated opera house. It was also Goossens who insisted that Bennelong Point be the site: Cahill had wanted it to be on or near Wynyard railway station in the northwest of the central business district.

==== Architecture competition 1955–1957 ====
An international design competition with a grand prize of 5,000 Australian pounds was launched by Cahill on 13 September 1955 and received 233 entries, representing architects from 32 countries. The criteria specified a large hall seating 3,000 and a small hall for 1,200 people, each to be designed for different uses, including full-scale operas, orchestral and choral concerts, mass meetings, lectures, ballet performances, and other presentations.

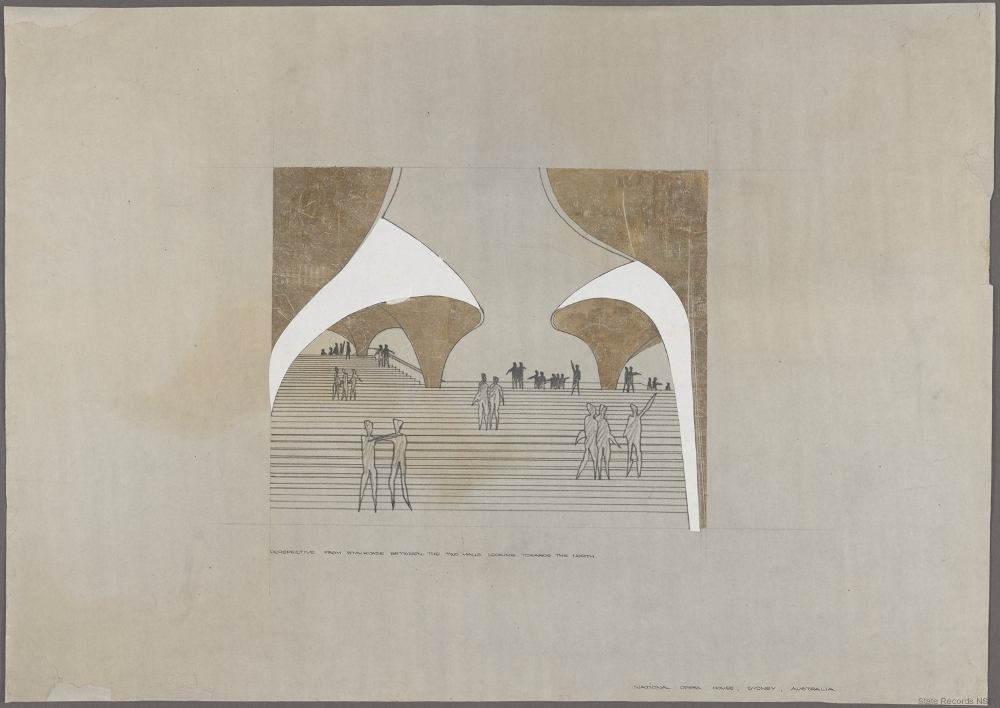
Jørn Utzon's initial sketches in 1957

The jury for the competition were: Professor Henry Ashworth (University of Sydney), Cobden Parkes (New South Wales Government Architect); Professor Leslie Martin (Professor of Architecture of Cambridge University and architect of Royal Festival Hall 1951) and Finnish-American architect Eero Saarinen.

The winner, announced in Sydney on 29 January 1957, was Danish architect Jørn Utzon. Saarinen selected Utzon's distinctive design from a final cut of 30 finalists. Utzon's design was inspired by natural shapes, most notably those of bird wings, clouds, shells, walnuts, rivers and palm leaves.

The runner-up was a Philadelphia-based team assembled by Robert Geddes and George Qualls, both teaching at the University of Pennsylvania School of Design. They brought together a band of Penn faculty and friends from Philadelphia architectural offices, including Melvin Brecher, Warren Cunningham, Joseph Marzella, Walter Wiseman, and Leon Loschetter. Geddes, Brecher, Qualls, and Cunningham went on to found the firm GBQC Architects.

Utzon first visited Sydney on 29 July 1957 along with Erik Andersson who had worked on the competition scheme, to help establish and supervise the developing project. They arrived with a new model of the scheme that was presented at a public meeting Sydney Town Hall on 7 August 1957. They departed Sydney on August 22 headed for Tokyo, planning to return to Sydney in March 1958. His office moved to Palm Beach, Sydney in February 1963.

Utzon received the Pritzker Architecture Prize, architecture's highest honour, in 2003. The Pritzker Prize citation read:

There is no doubt that the Sydney Opera House is his masterpiece. It is one of the great iconic buildings of the 20th century, an image of great beauty that has become known throughout the world – a symbol for not only a city but a whole country and continent.

=== Design development and construction timeline ===
==== Preparation of site ====
The Fort Macquarie Tram Depot, occupying the site on the original Fort Macquarie at the time of these plans, was demolished in 1958 and construction began in March 1959. The Opera House was built in four stages: stage I (1957–1959) was planning out the building; stage II (1959–1963) consisted of building the upper podium; stage III (1963–1967) the construction of the outer shells, based upon the image of whales breaching the water; stage IV (1967–1973) interior design and construction.

==== Stage I: Podium ====
Stage I started on 2 March 1959 with the construction firm Civil & Civic, monitored by the engineers Ove Arup & Partners. The government had pushed for work to begin early, fearing that funding, or public opinion, might turn against them. But Utzon had still not completed the final designs. Major structural issues still remained unresolved. By 23 January 1961, work was running 47 weeks behind, mainly because of unexpected difficulties (inclement weather, unexpected difficulty diverting stormwater, construction beginning before proper construction drawings had been prepared, changes of original contract documents). Work on the podium was finally completed in February 1963. The forced early start led to significant later problems, not least of which was that the podium columns were not strong enough to support the roof structure, and had to be re-built.

==== Stage II: Roof ====
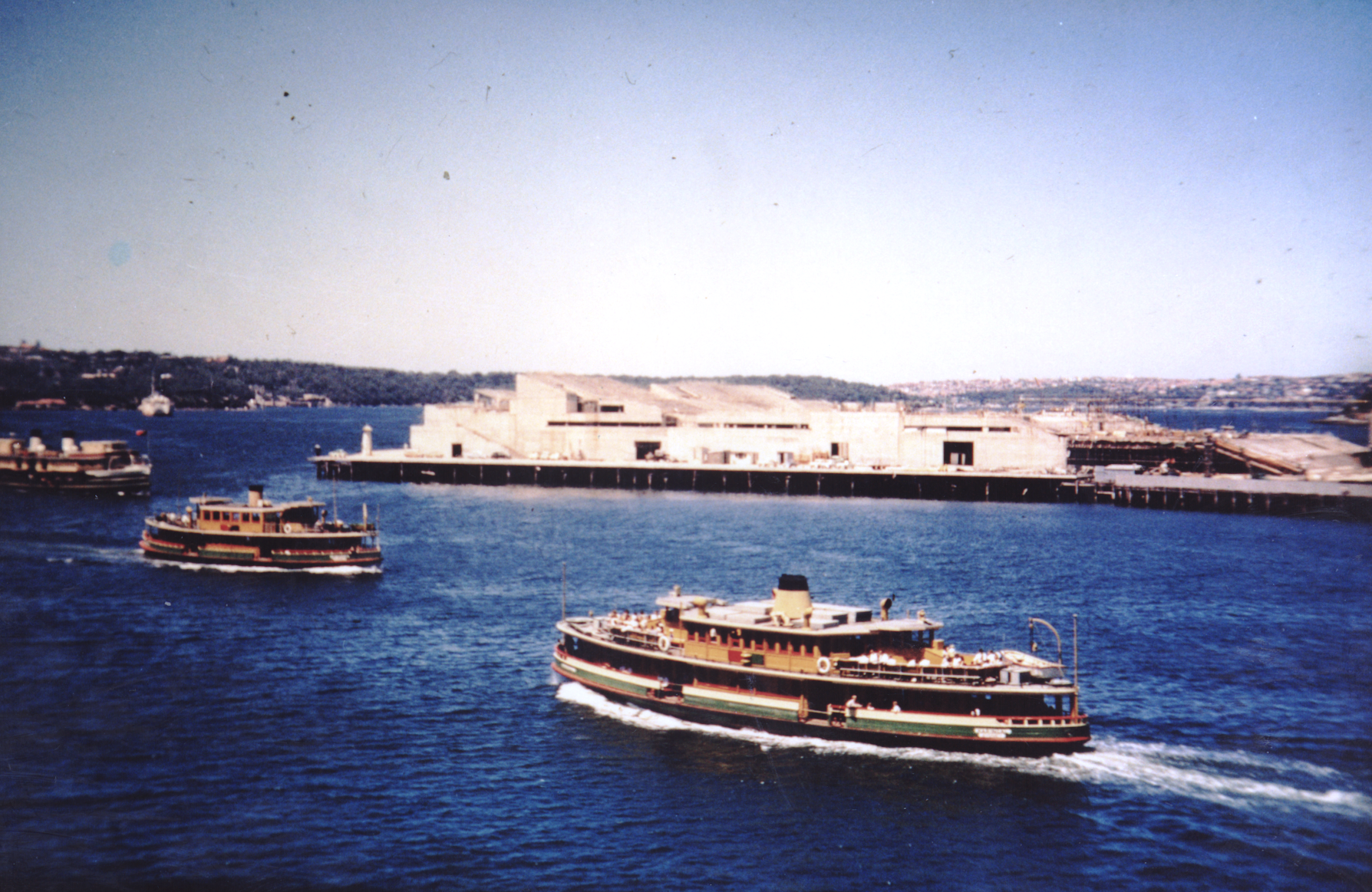
Podium structure complete, 1962

Shells structure, c. 1965

Roof and shell structure, c. 1965

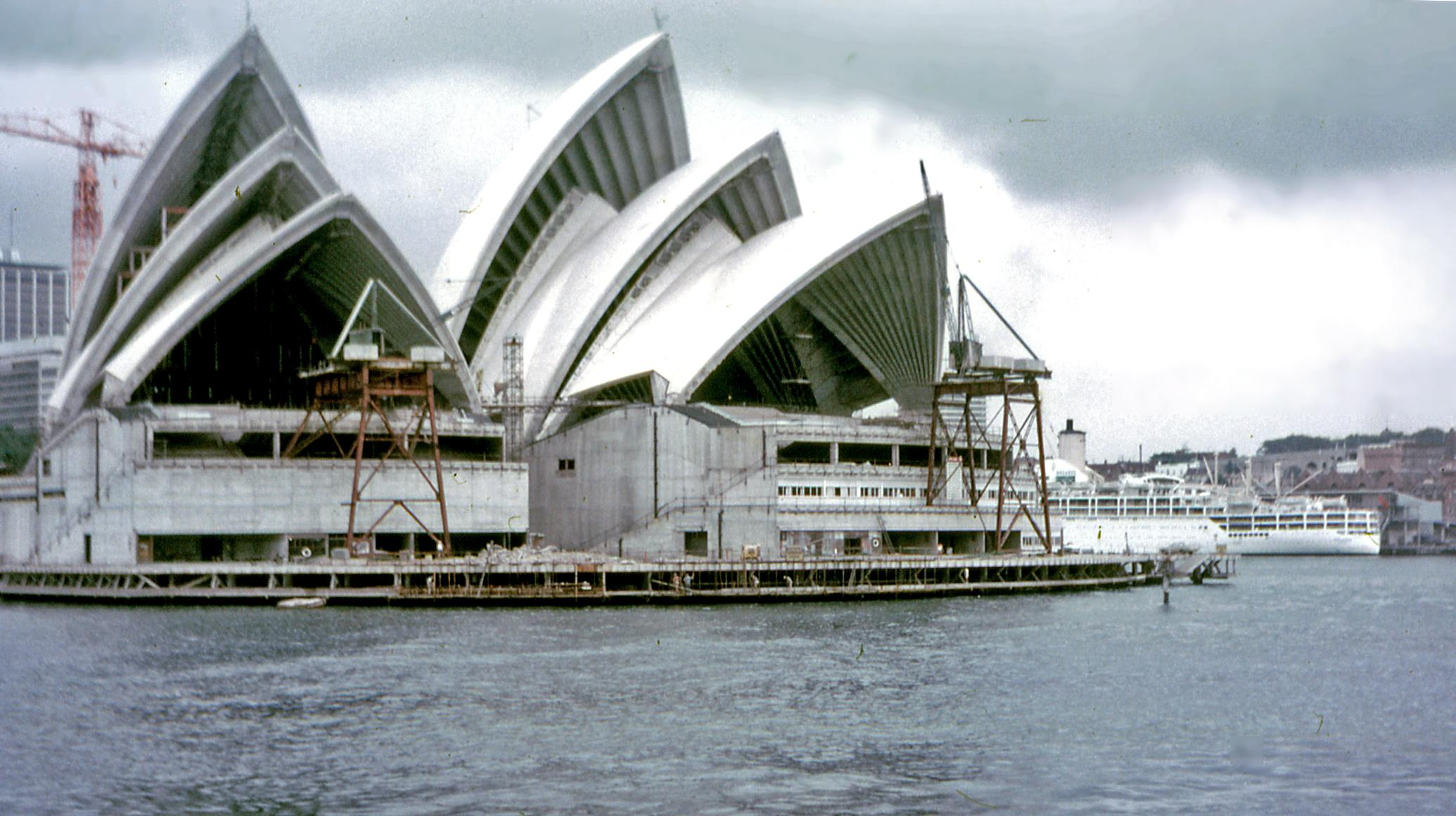
Tiles complete, c. 1968

The shells of the competition entry were originally of undefined geometry, but, early in the design process, the "shells" were perceived as a series of parabolas supported by precast concrete ribs. However, Ove Arup & Partners were unable to find an acceptable solution to constructing them. The formwork for using in-situ concrete would have been prohibitively expensive, and, because there was no repetition in any of the roof forms, the construction of precast concrete for each individual section would possibly have been even more expensive.

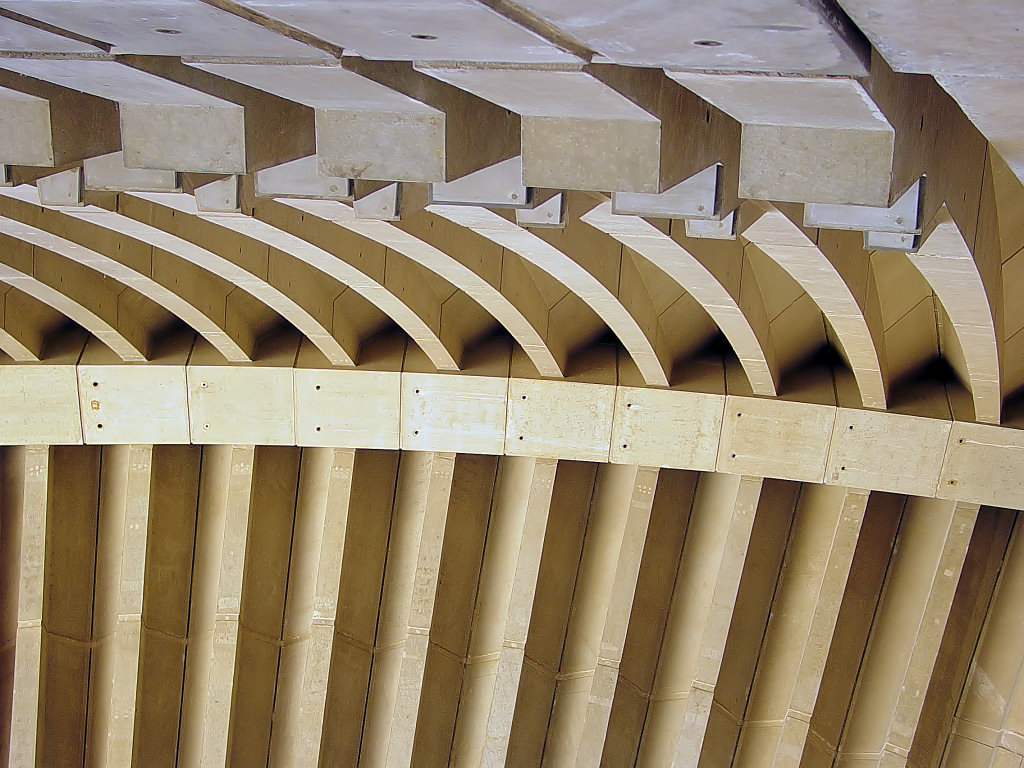
Sydney Opera House shell ribs

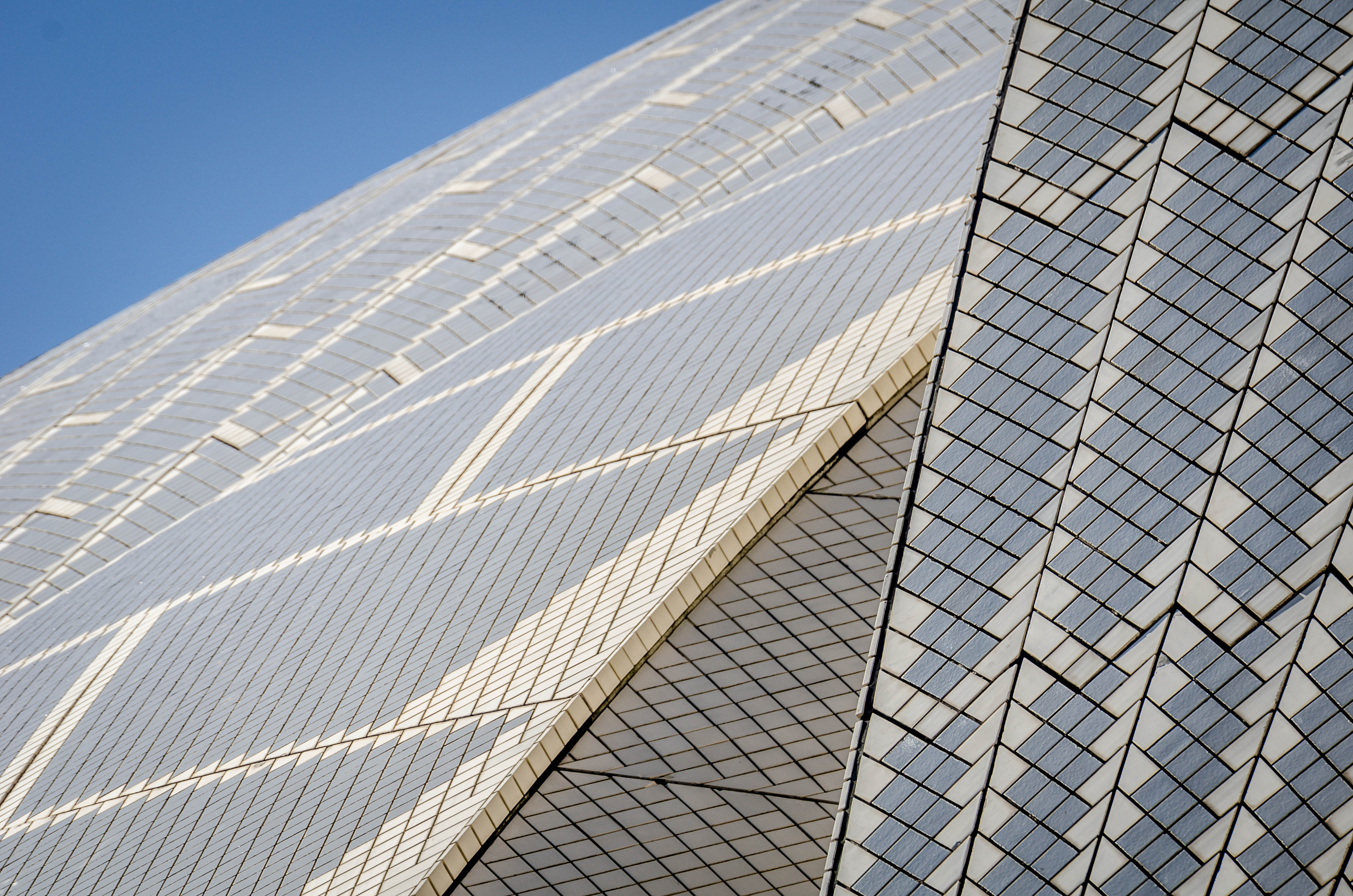
The glazed ceramic tiles of the Sydney Opera House

From 1957 to 1963, the design team went through at least 12 iterations of the form of the shells trying to find an economically acceptable form (including schemes with parabolas, circular ribs and ellipsoids) before a workable solution was completed.

The design work on the shells involved one of the earliest uses of computers in structural analysis, to understand the complex forces to which the shells would be subjected. The computer system was also used in the assembly of the arches. The pins in the arches were surveyed at the end of each day, and the information was entered into the computer so the next arch could be properly placed the following day.

In mid-1961, the design team found a solution to the problem: the shells all being created as sections from a sphere. This solution allows arches of varying length to be cast in a common mould, and a number of arch segments of common length to be placed adjacent to one another, to form a spherical section. With whom exactly this solution originated has been the subject of some controversy. It was originally credited to Utzon. Ove Arup's letter to Ashworth, a member of the Sydney Opera House Executive Committee, states: "Utzon came up with an idea of making all the shells of uniform curvature throughout in both directions." Peter Jones, the author of Ove Arup's biography, states that "the architect and his supporters alike claimed to recall the precise eureka moment ...; the engineers and some of their associates, with equal conviction, recall discussion in both central London and at Ove's house."

He goes on to claim that "the existing evidence shows that Arup's canvassed several possibilities for the geometry of the shells, from parabolas to ellipsoids and spheres." Yuzo Mikami, a member of the design team, presents an opposite view in his book on the project, Utzon's Sphere. It is unlikely that the truth will ever be categorically known, but there is a clear consensus that the design team worked very well indeed for the first part of the project and that Utzon, Arup, and Ronald Jenkins (partner of Ove Arup and Partners responsible for the Opera House project) all played a very significant part in the design development.

As Peter Murray states in The Saga of the Sydney Opera House:

... the two men—and their teams—enjoyed a collaboration that was remarkable in its fruitfulness and, despite many traumas, was seen by most of those involved in the project as a high point of architect/engineer collaboration.

The design of the roof was tested on scale models in wind tunnels at University of Southampton and later NPL to establish the wind-pressure distribution around the roof shape in very high winds, which helped in the design of the roof tiles and their fixtures.

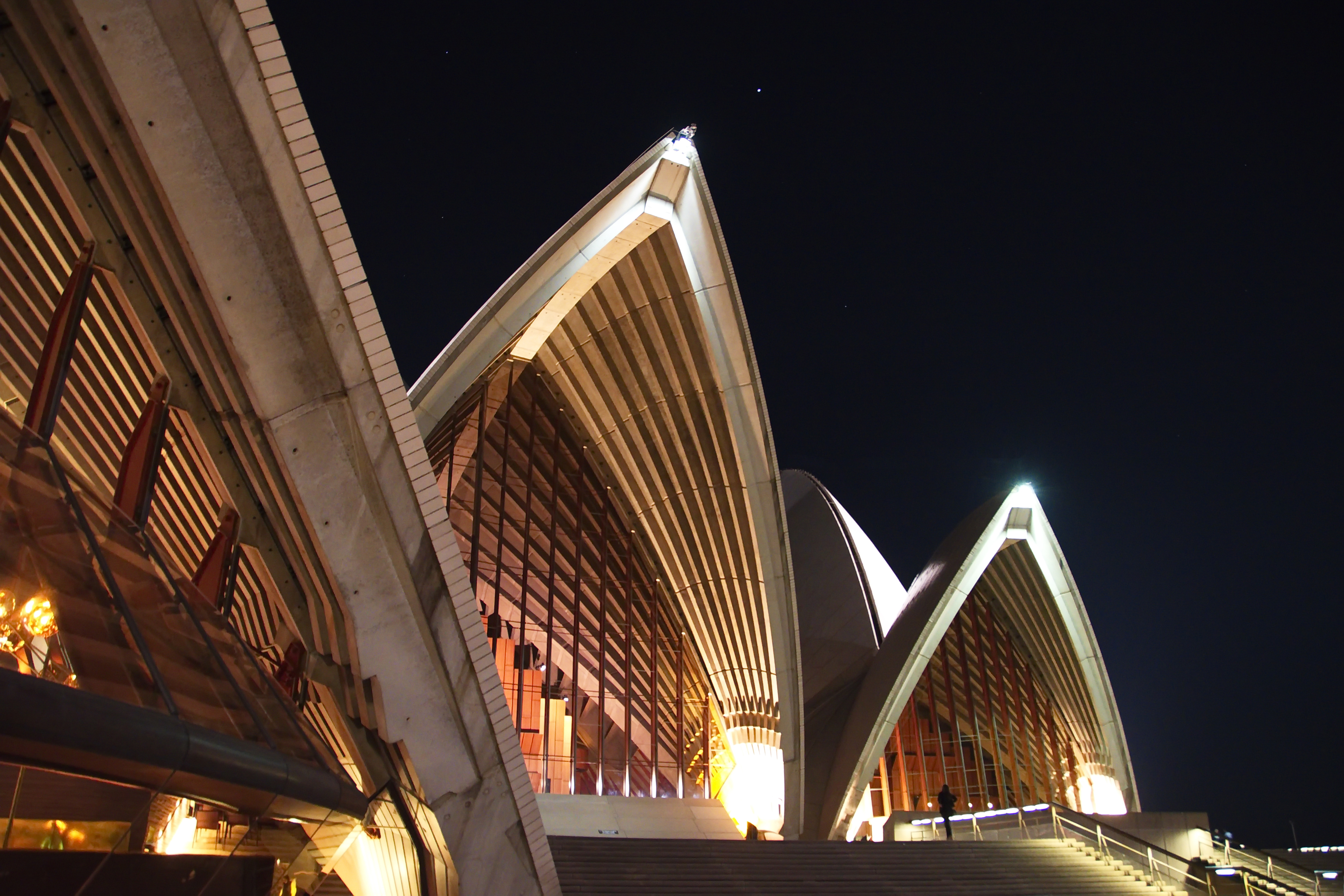
The shells of the Opera House at night, viewed from the south

The immensely complex design and construction of the shells was completed by Hornibrook, who were also responsible for construction in Stage III. Hornibrook manufactured the 2400 precast ribs and 4000 roof panels in an on-site factory and also developed the construction processes. The achievement of this solution avoided the need for expensive formwork construction by allowing the use of precast units and it also allowed the roof tiles to be prefabricated in sheets on the ground, instead of being stuck on individually at height.

The tiles themselves were manufactured by the Swedish company Höganäs Keramik. It took three years of development to produce the effect Utzon wanted in what became known as the Sydney Tile, 120mm square. It is made from clay with a small percentage of crushed stone.

Ove Arup and Partners' site engineer supervised the construction of the shells, which used an innovative adjustable steel-trussed "erection arch" (developed by Hornibrook's engineer Joe Bertony) to support the different roofs before completion. On 6 April 1962, it was estimated that the Opera House would be completed between August 1964 and March 1965.

==== Stage III: Interiors ====
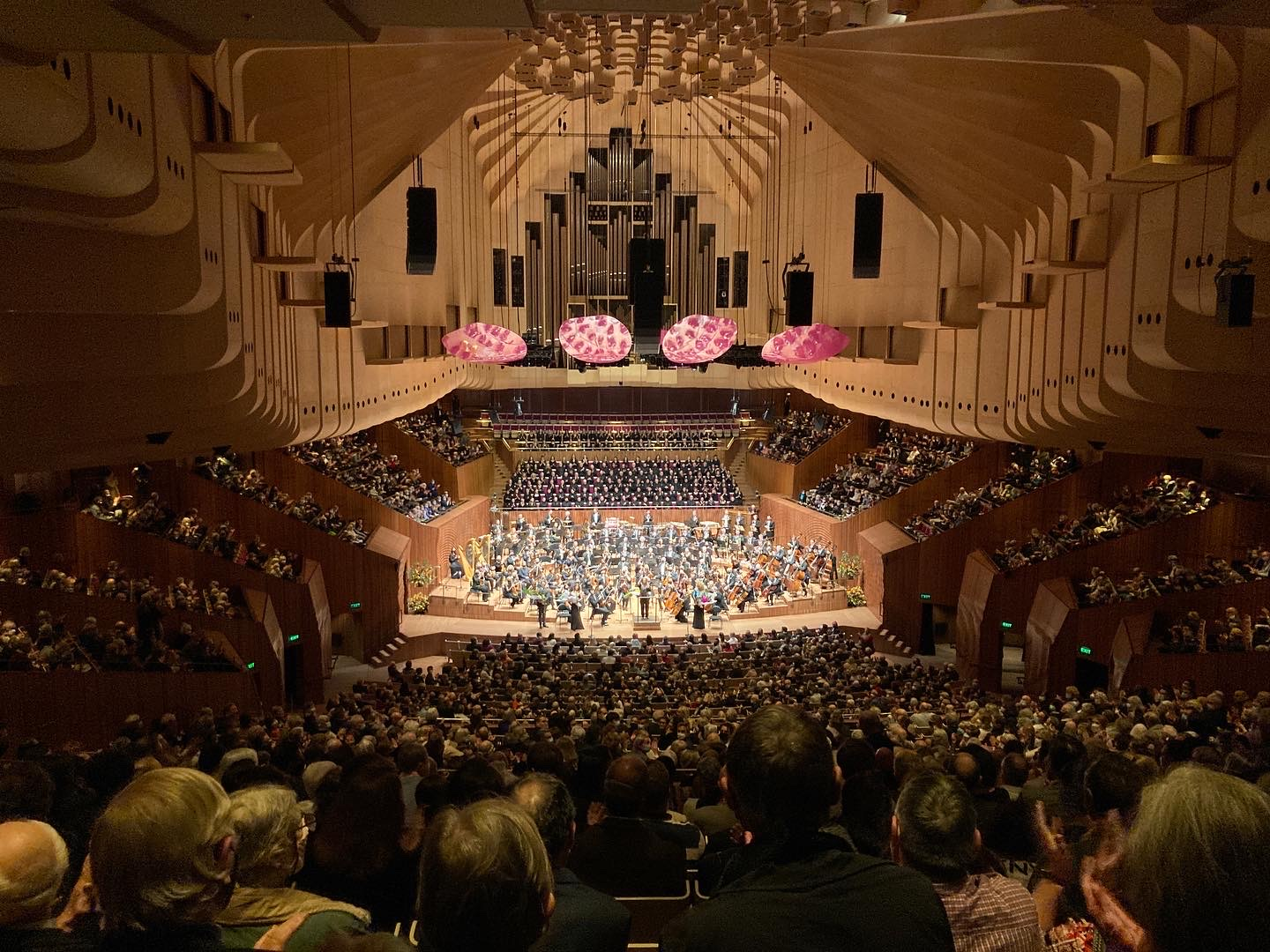
The Concert Hall and organ

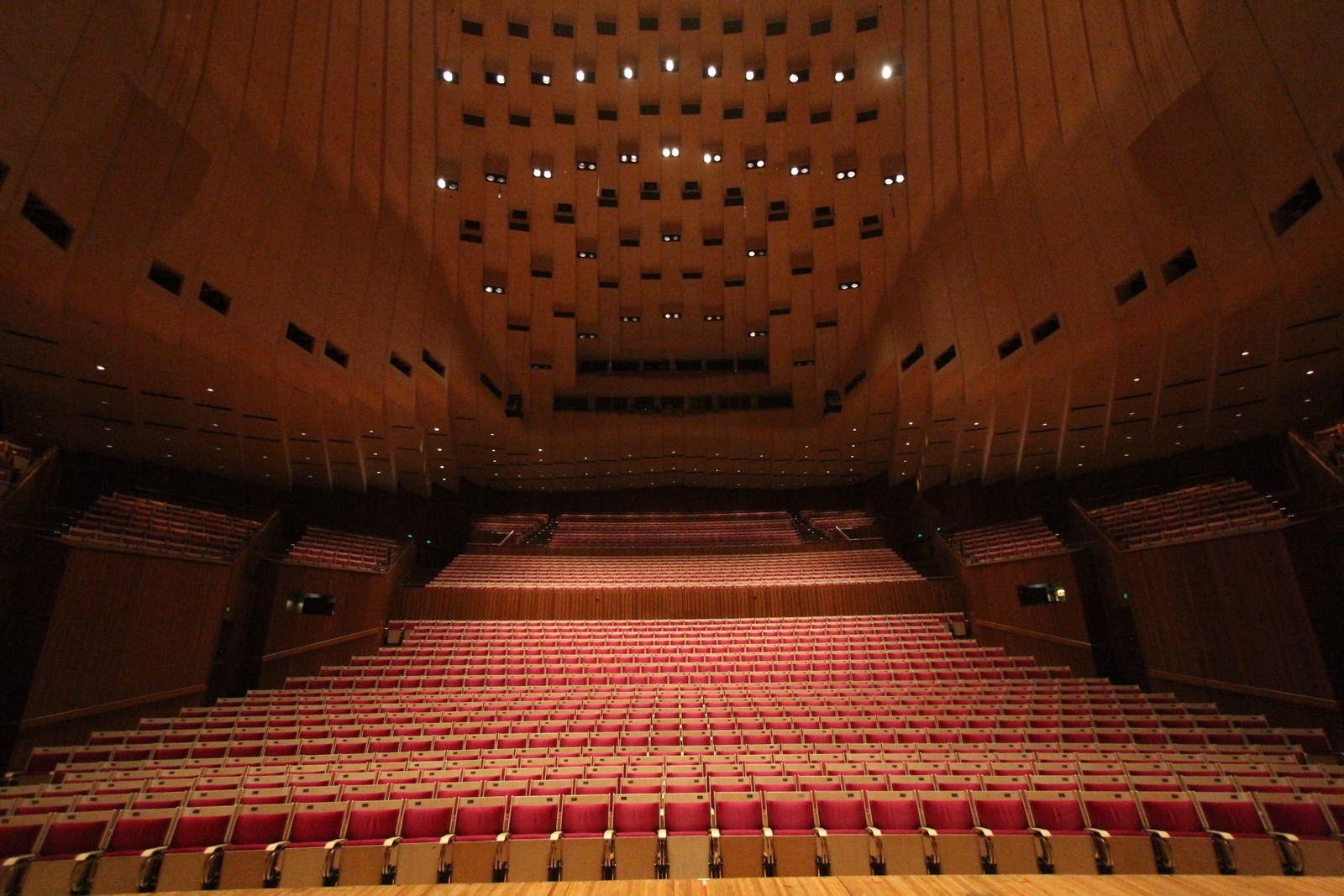
View from the stage of the Concert Hall

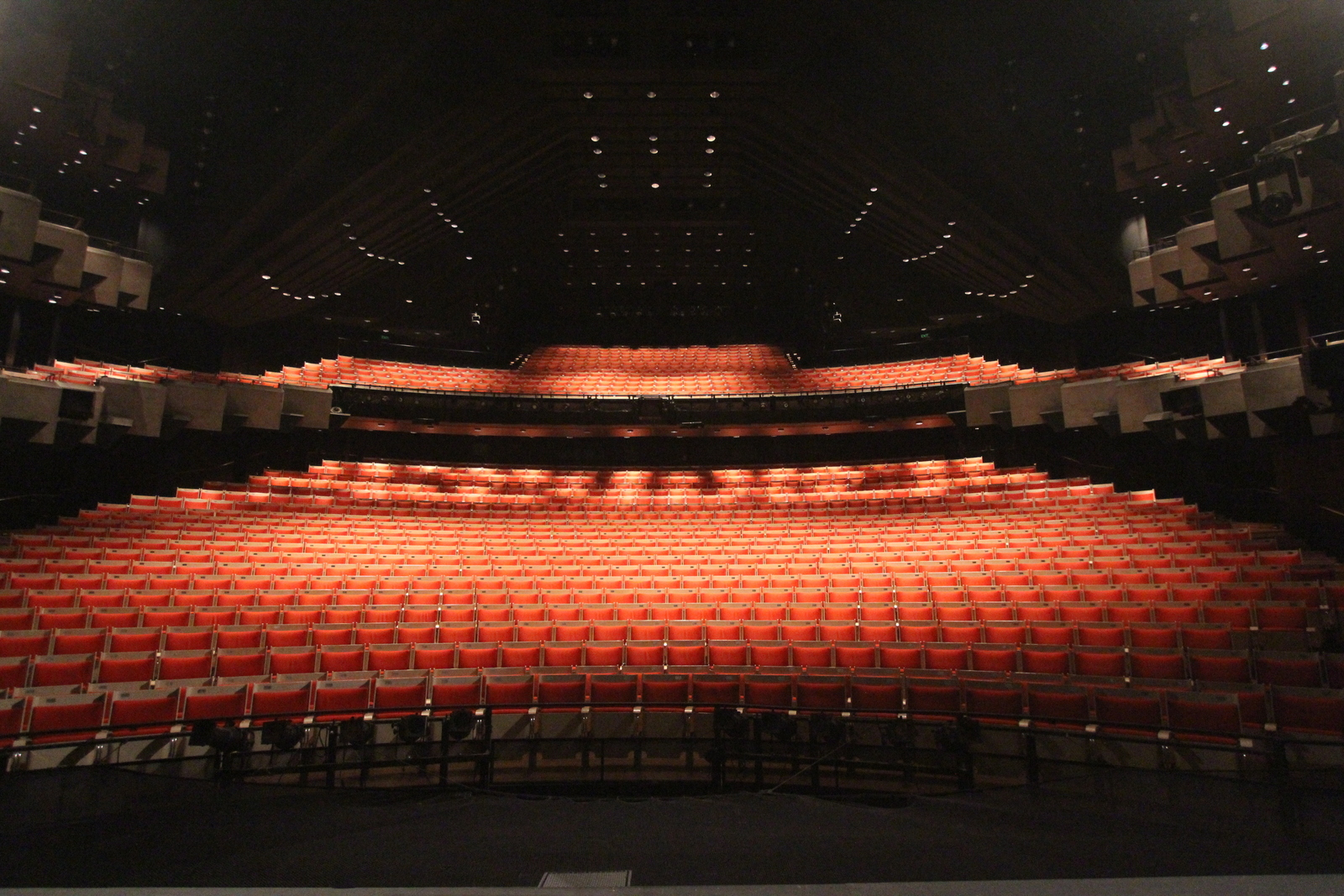
View from the stage of the Joan Sutherland Theatre

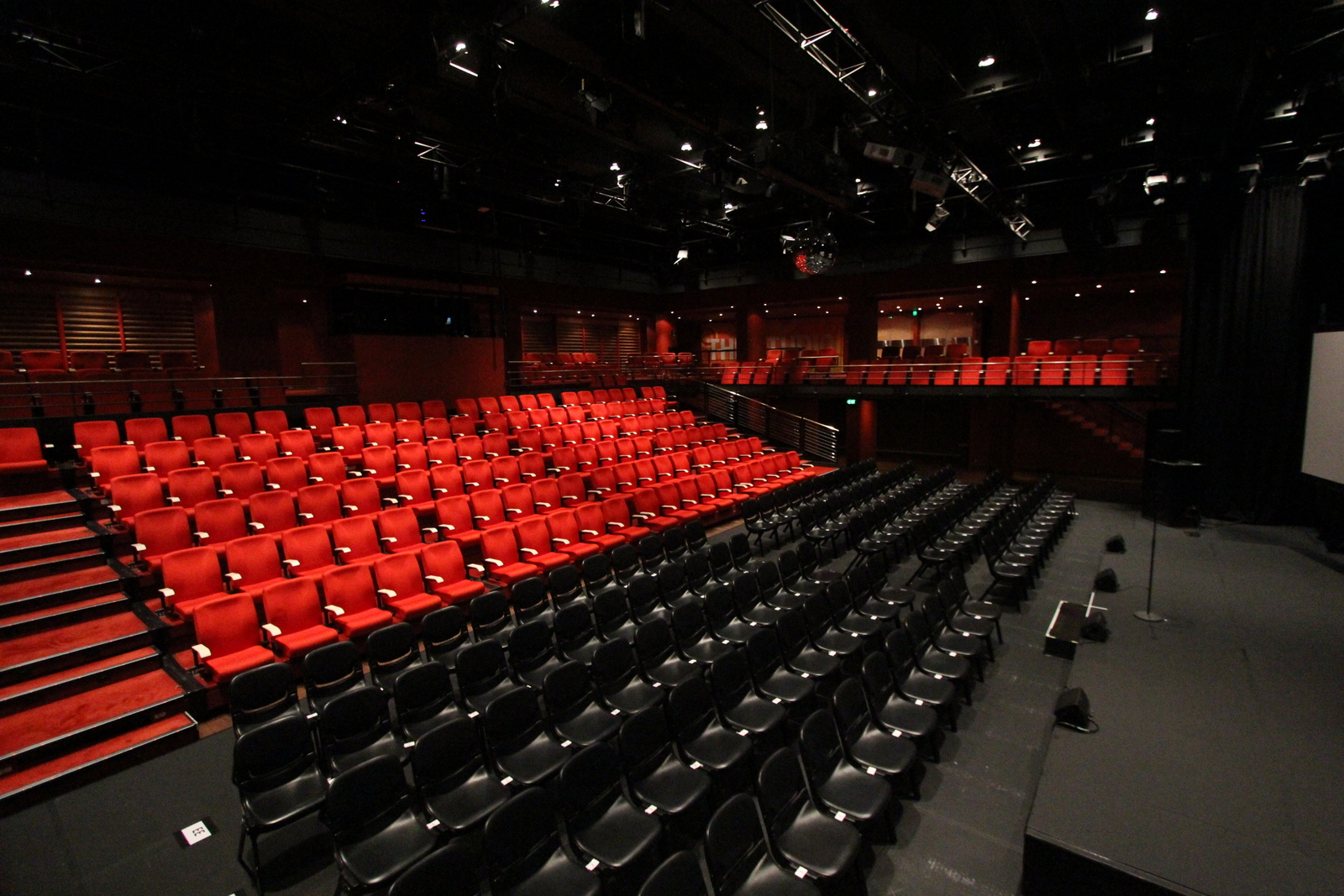
Interior of the Studio Theatre

Stage III, the interiors, started with Utzon moving his entire office to Sydney in February 1963. However, there was a change of government in 1965, and the new Robert Askin government declared the project under the jurisdiction of the Ministry of Public Works. Due to the Ministry's criticism of the project's costs and time, along with their impression of Utzon's designs being impractical, this ultimately led to his resignation in 1966 (see below).

The cost of the project so far, even in October 1966, was still only A$22.9 million, less than a quarter of the final $102 million cost. However, the projected costs for the design were at this stage much more significant.

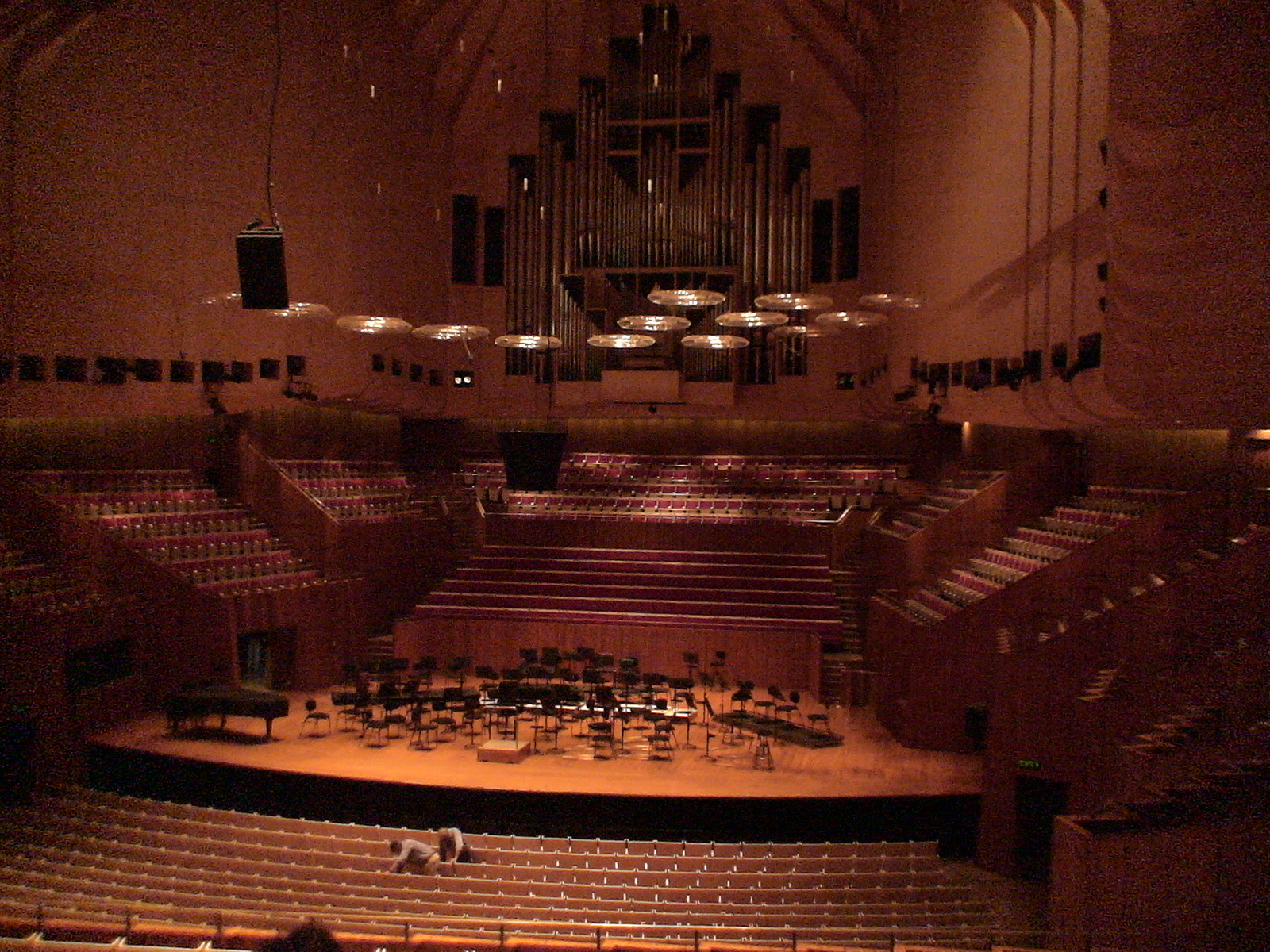
The Concert Hall prior to renovations in 2020

The second stage of construction was progressing toward completion when Utzon resigned. His position was principally taken over by Peter Hall, who became largely responsible for the interior design. Other persons appointed that same year to replace Utzon were E. H. Farmer as government architect, D. S. Littlemore and Lionel Todd.

Following Utzon's resignation, the acoustic advisor, Lothar Cremer, confirmed to the Sydney Opera House Executive Committee (SOHEC) that Utzon's original acoustic design allowed for only 2,000 seats in the main hall and further stated that increasing the number of seats to 3,000 as specified in the brief would be disastrous for the acoustics. According to Peter Jones, the stage designer, Martin Carr, criticised the "shape, height and width of the stage, the physical facilities for artists, the location of the dressing rooms, the widths of doors and lifts, and the location of lighting switchboards."

==== Significant changes to Utzon's design ====
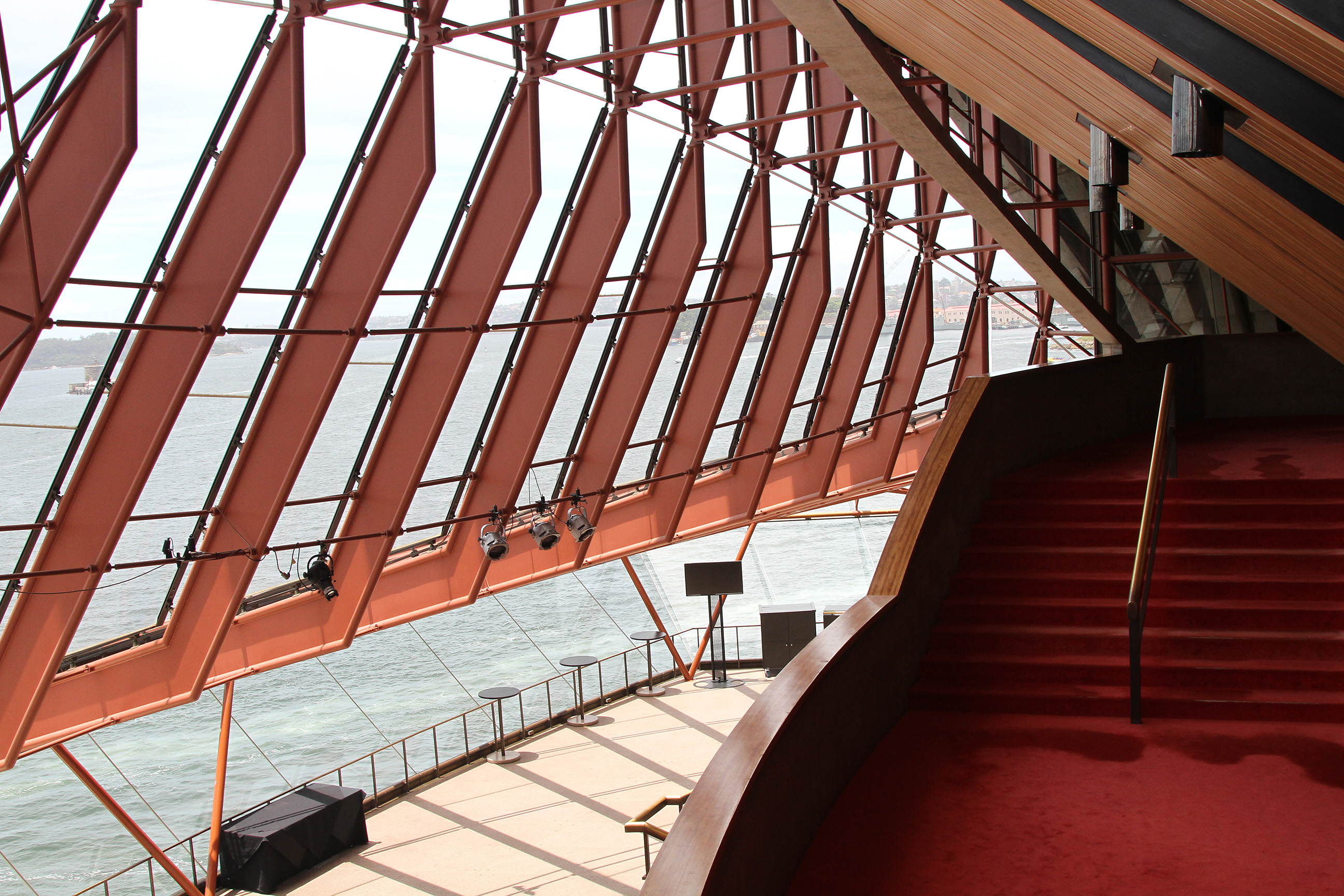
The foyer of the Joan Sutherland Theatre, showing the internal structure and steel framing of the glass curtain walls; the final constructions were modified from Utzon's original designs

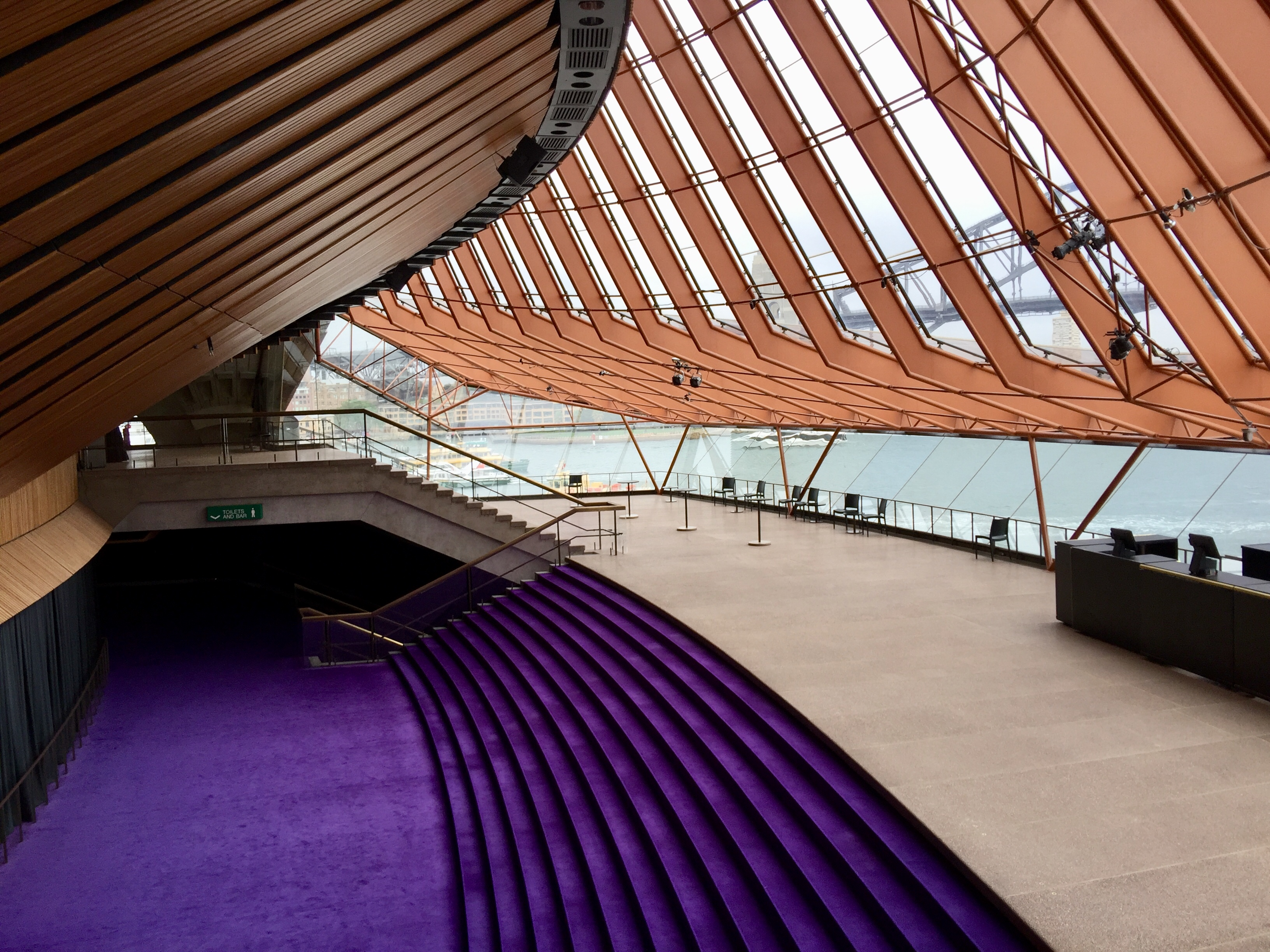
The foyer of the Concert Hall

- The major hall, which was originally intended to be a multipurpose opera/concert hall, became solely a concert hall (named the Concert Hall). The minor hall, originally designed for stage productions only, incorporated opera and ballet functions and was called the Opera Theatre, later renamed the Joan Sutherland Theatre. As a result, the Joan Sutherland Theatre is now inadequate for staging large-scale opera and ballet. A theatre, a cinema and a library were also added. These were later changed to two live drama theatres and a smaller theatre "in the round". These now comprise the Drama Theatre, the Playhouse and the Studio respectively. These changes were primarily due to inadequacies in the original competition brief, which did not specify how the Opera House was to be used. The layout of the interiors was changed, and the stage machinery, already designed and fitted inside the major hall, was pulled out and largely thrown away, as detailed in the 1968 BBC TV documentary Autopsy on a Dream, which "chronicles the full spectrum of controversy surrounding the construction of the Sydney Opera House".
- Externally, the cladding to the podium and the paving (the podium was originally not to be clad down to the water, but to be left open).
- The construction of the glass walls: Utzon was planning to use a system of prefabricated plywood mullions, but a different system was designed to deal with the glass.
- Utzon's plywood corridor designs, along with his acoustic and seating designs for the interior of both major halls, were scrapped completely. His design for the Concert Hall was rejected as it only seated 2000, which was considered insufficient. Utzon had employed the acoustic consultant Lothar Cremer, and his designs for the major halls were later modelled and found to be very good. By contrast, the subsequent Todd, Hall, and Littlemore versions of both major halls have some problems with acoustics, particularly for the performing musicians. The orchestra pit in the Joan Sutherland Theatre is cramped and dangerous to musicians' hearing. The Concert Hall has a very high roof, leading to a lack of early reflections onstage—perspex rings (the "acoustic clouds") hanging over the stage were added shortly before opening in an (unsuccessful) attempt to address this problem.

==== Completion and cost ====
The Opera House was formally completed in 1973, having cost $102 million. H.R. "Sam" Hoare, the Hornibrook director in charge of the project, provided the following approximations in 1973: Stage I: podium Civil & Civic approximately $5.5m. Stage II: roof shells MR Hornibrook approximately $12.5m. Stage III: completion MR Hornibrook $56.5m. Separate contracts: stage equipment, stage lighting and organ $9.0m. Fees and other costs: $16.5m.

The original cost and scheduling estimates in 1957 projected a cost of £3,500,000 ($7 million) and completion date of 26 January 1963 (Australia Day). In reality, the project was completed ten years late and 1,357% over budget in real terms.

==== Strike and Workers' Control ====
In 1972, a construction worker was fired, leading the BLF-affiliated workers to demand his rehiring and a 25% wage increase. In response to this, all the workers were fired, and in revenge the workers broke into the construction site with a crowbar and brought their own toolboxes. Workers' control was applied to the site for five weeks as the construction workers worked 35 hours a week with improved morale, more efficient organization and fewer people skipping work. The workers agreed to end their work-in when management agreed to give them a 25% wage increase, the right to elect their foremen, four weeks annual leave and a large payment for their troubles.

=== Utzon and his resignation ===
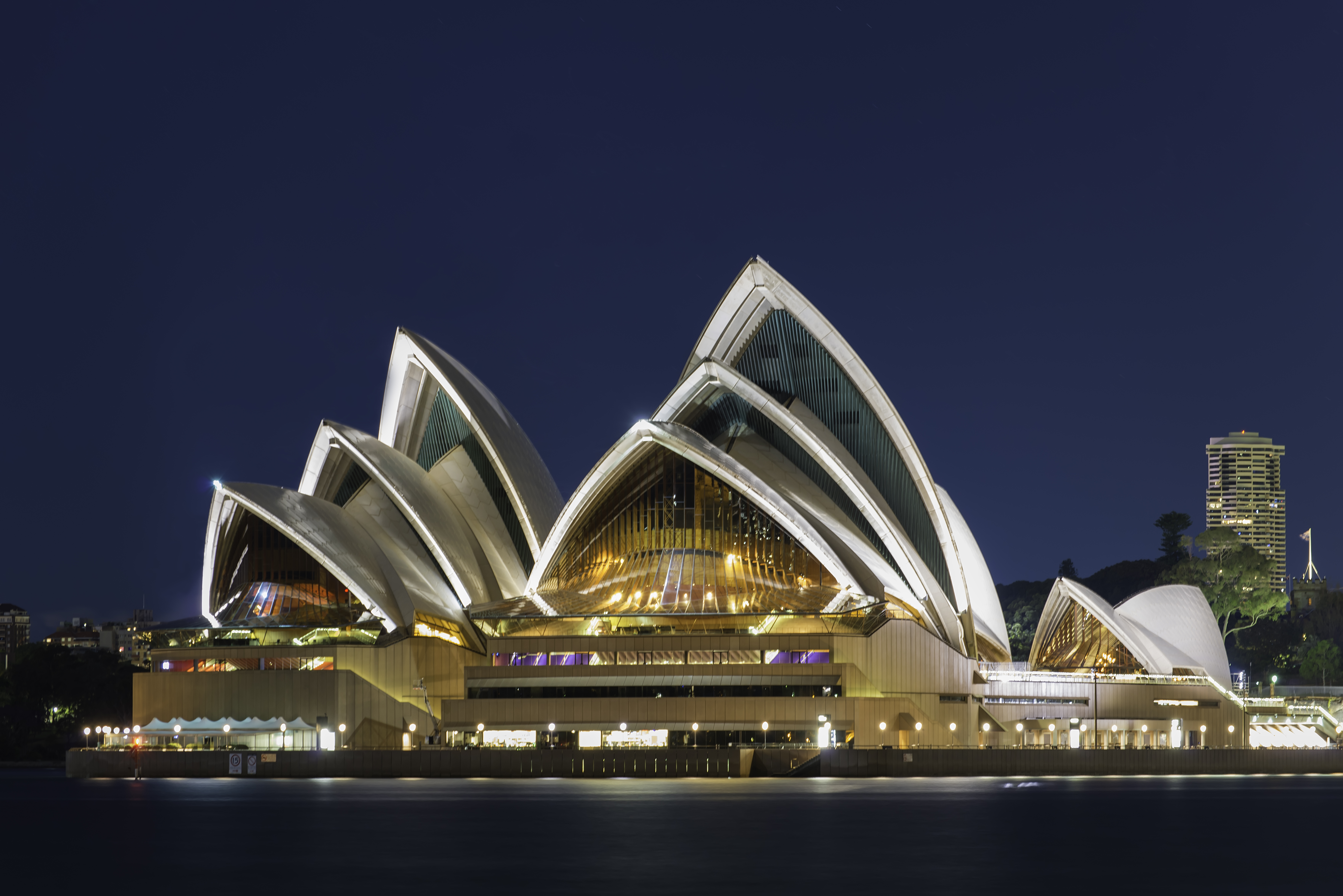
The building illuminated at night

Before the Sydney Opera House competition, Jørn Utzon had won seven of the 18 competitions he had entered but had never seen any of his designs built. Utzon's submitted concept for the Sydney Opera House was almost universally admired and considered groundbreaking. The Assessors Report of January 1957 stated:

The drawings submitted for this scheme are simple to the point of being diagrammatic. Nevertheless, as we have returned again and again to the study of these drawings, we are convinced that they present a concept of an Opera House which is capable of becoming one of the great buildings of the world.

For the first stage, Utzon worked successfully with the rest of the design team and the client, but, as the project progressed, the Cahill government insisted on progressive revisions. They also did not fully appreciate the costs or work involved in design and construction. Tensions between the client and the design team grew further when an early start to construction was demanded despite an incomplete design. This resulted in a continuing series of delays and setbacks while various technical engineering issues were being refined. The building was unique, and the problems with the design issues and cost increases were exacerbated by commencement of work before the completion of the final plans.

After the 1965 election of the Liberal Party, with Robert Askin becoming Premier of New South Wales, the relationship of client, architect, engineers and contractors became increasingly tense. Askin had been a "vocal critic of the project prior to gaining office." His new Minister for Public Works, Davis Hughes, was even less sympathetic. Elizabeth Farrelly, an Australian architecture critic, wrote that:

at an election night dinner party in Mosman, Hughes' daughter Sue Burgoyne boasted that her father would soon sack Utzon. Hughes had no interest in art, architecture or aesthetics. A fraud, as well as a philistine, he had been exposed before Parliament and dumped as Country Party leader for 19 years of falsely claiming a university degree. The Opera House gave Hughes a second chance. For him, as for Utzon, it was all about control; about the triumph of homegrown mediocrity over foreign genius.

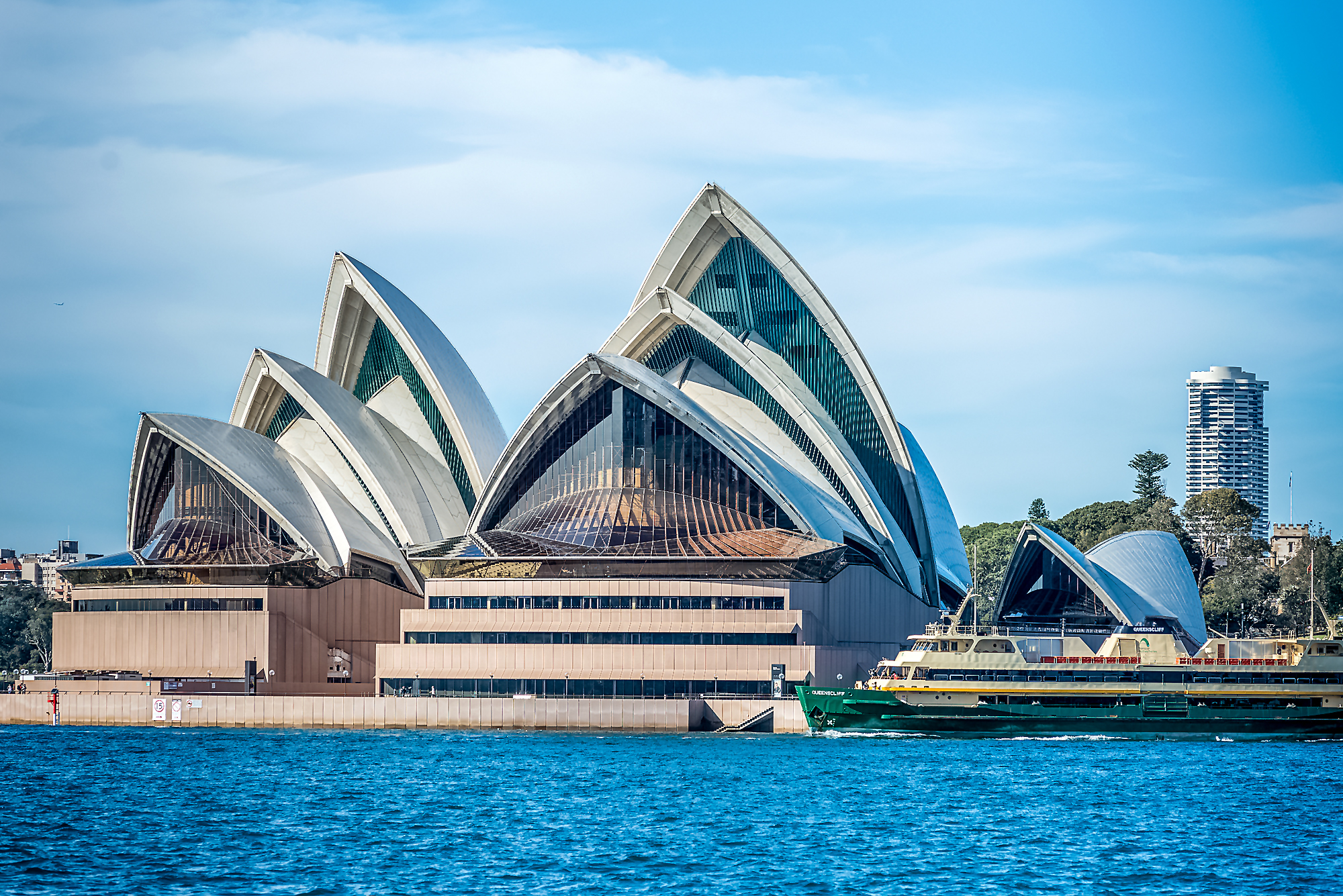
The Opera House seen from the north

Differences ensued. One of the first was that Utzon believed the clients should receive information on all aspects of the design and construction through his practice, while the clients wanted a system (notably drawn in sketch form by Davis Hughes) where architect, contractors, and engineers each reported to the client directly and separately. This had great implications for procurement methods and cost control, with Utzon wishing to negotiate contracts with chosen suppliers (such as Ralph Symonds for the plywood interiors) and the New South Wales government insisting contracts be put out to tender.

Utzon was highly reluctant to respond to questions or criticism from the client's Sydney Opera House Executive Committee (SOHEC). However, he was greatly supported throughout by a member of the committee and one of the original competition judges, Harry Ingham Ashworth. Utzon was unwilling to compromise on some aspects of his designs that the clients wanted to change.

Utzon's ability was never in doubt, despite questions raised by Davis Hughes, who attempted to portray Utzon as an impractical dreamer. Ove Arup actually stated that Utzon was "probably the best of any I have come across in my long experience of working with architects" and: "The Opera House could become the world's foremost contemporary masterpiece if Utzon is given his head."

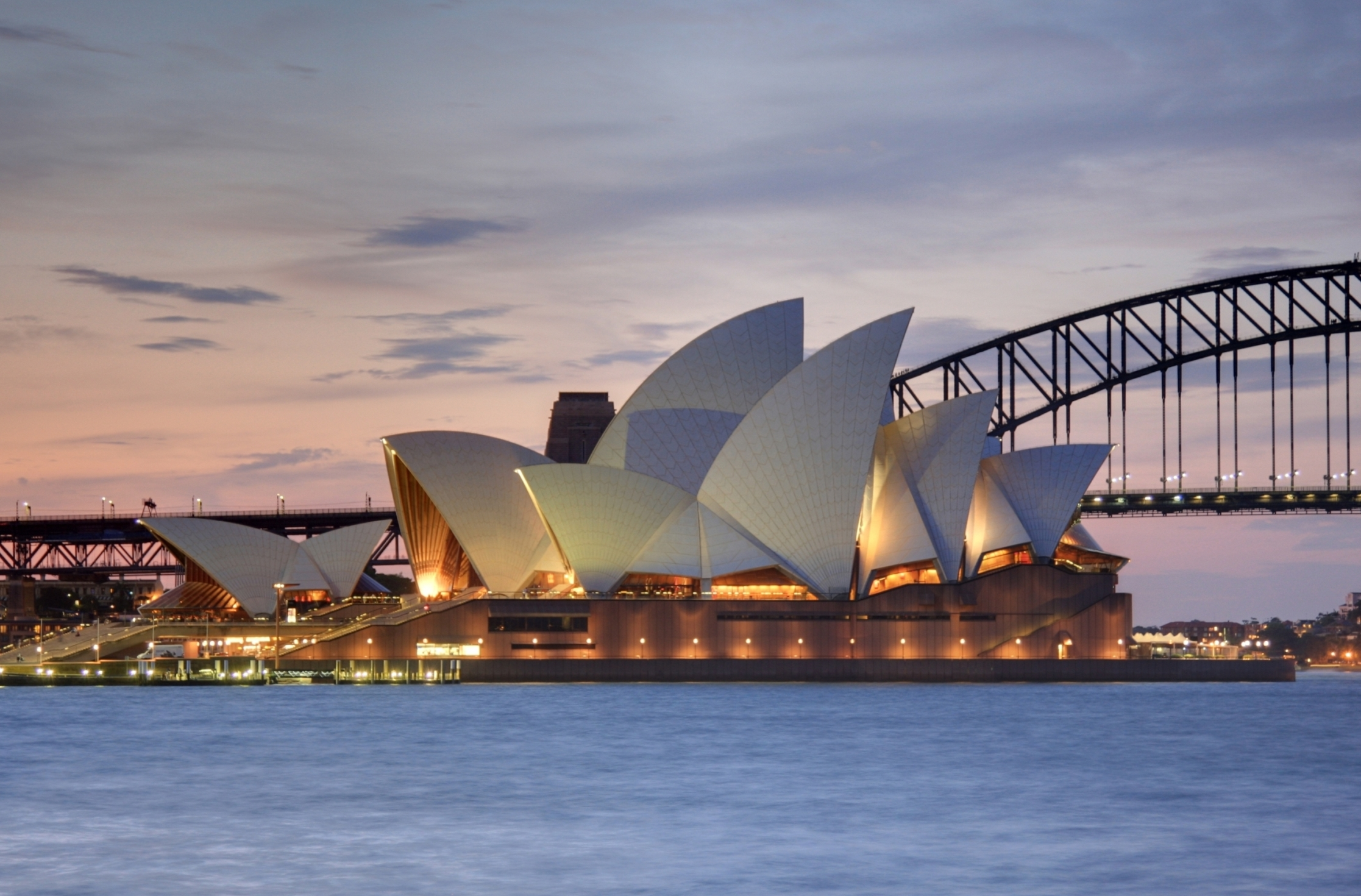
The Opera House, backed by the Sydney Harbour Bridge, from the eastern Botanic Gardens

In 1965 Utzon was working closely with Ralph Symonds, a manufacturer of plywood based in Sydney and highly regarded by many, despite an Arup engineer warning that Ralph Symonds's "knowledge of the design stresses of plywood was extremely sketchy" and that the technical advice was "elementary to say the least and completely useless for our purposes." Australian architecture critic Elizabeth Farrelly has referred to Ove Arup's project engineer Michael Lewis as having "other agendas". By February 1966, Utzon was owed more than $100,000 in fees. Hughes then withheld funding so that Utzon could not even pay his own staff. The government minutes record that following several threats of resignation, Utzon finally stated to Davis Hughes: "If you don't do it, I resign." Hughes replied: "I accept your resignation. Thank you very much. Goodbye."

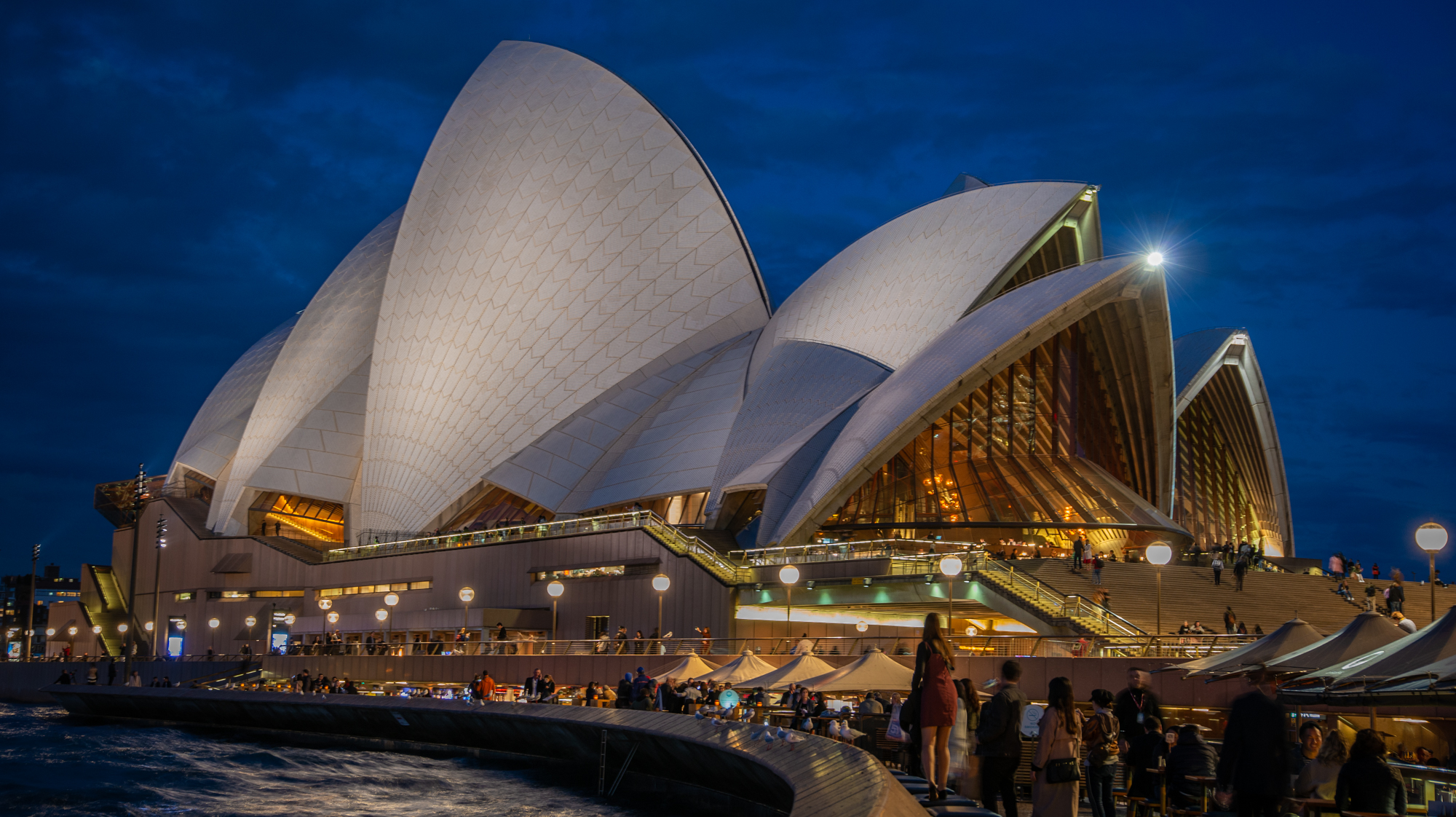
The Opera House viewed from the south west

Utzon left the project on 28 February 1966. He said that Hughes's refusal to pay him any fees and the lack of collaboration caused his resignation and later described the situation as "Malice in Blunderland". In March 1966, Hughes offered him a subordinate role as "design architect" under a panel of executive architects, without any supervisory powers over the House's construction, but Utzon rejected this. Utzon left Australia, never to return.

Following the resignation, there was great controversy about who was in the right and who was in the wrong. The Sydney Morning Herald initially opined: "No architect in the world has enjoyed greater freedom than Mr Utzon. Few clients have been more patient or more generous than the people and the Government of NSW. One would not like history to record that this partnership was brought to an end by a fit of temper on the one side or by a fit of meanness on the other." On 17 March 1966, the Herald offered the view that: "It was not his [Utzon's] fault that a succession of Governments and the Opera House Trust should so signally have failed to impose any control or order on the project ... his concept was so daring that he himself could solve its problems only step by step ... his insistence on perfection led him to alter his design as he went along."

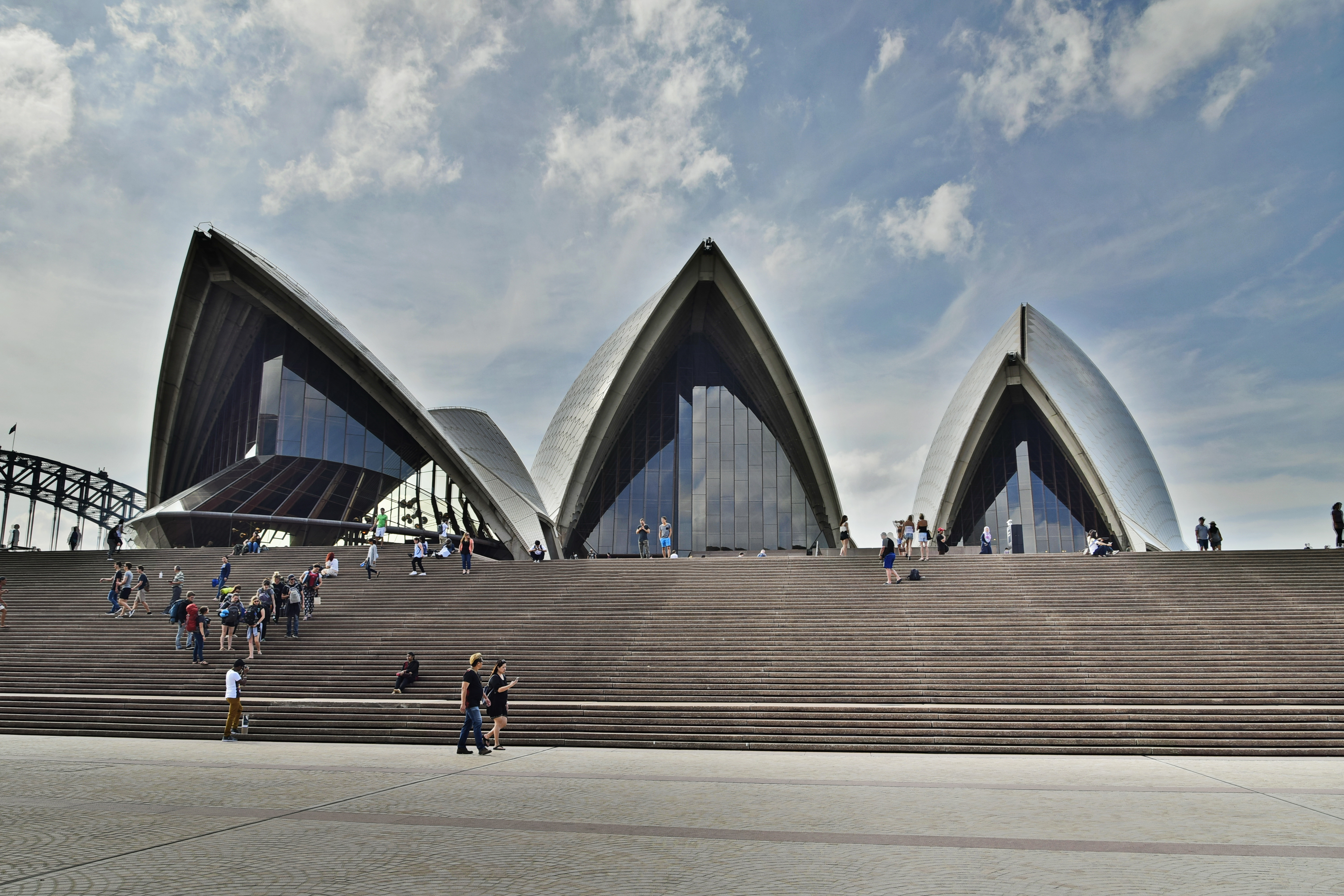
The steps of the Opera House

The Sydney Opera House opened the way for the complex geometries of modern architecture. The design was one of the first examples of the use of computer-aided design to design complex shapes. The design techniques were developed by Utzon and Arup for the Sydney Opera House have been further developed and are now used for architecture, such as works of Gehry and blobitecture, as well as most reinforced concrete structures. The design is also one of the world's first building to use araldite to glue the precast structural elements together and proved the concept for future use.

It was also a first in mechanical engineering. Another Danish firm, Steensen Varming, was responsible for designing the new air-conditioning plant, the largest in Australia at the time, supplying over 600,000 cubic feet (17,000 m^{3}) of air per minute, using the innovative idea of harnessing the harbour water to create a water-cooled heat pump system that is still in operation today.

=== Opening ===
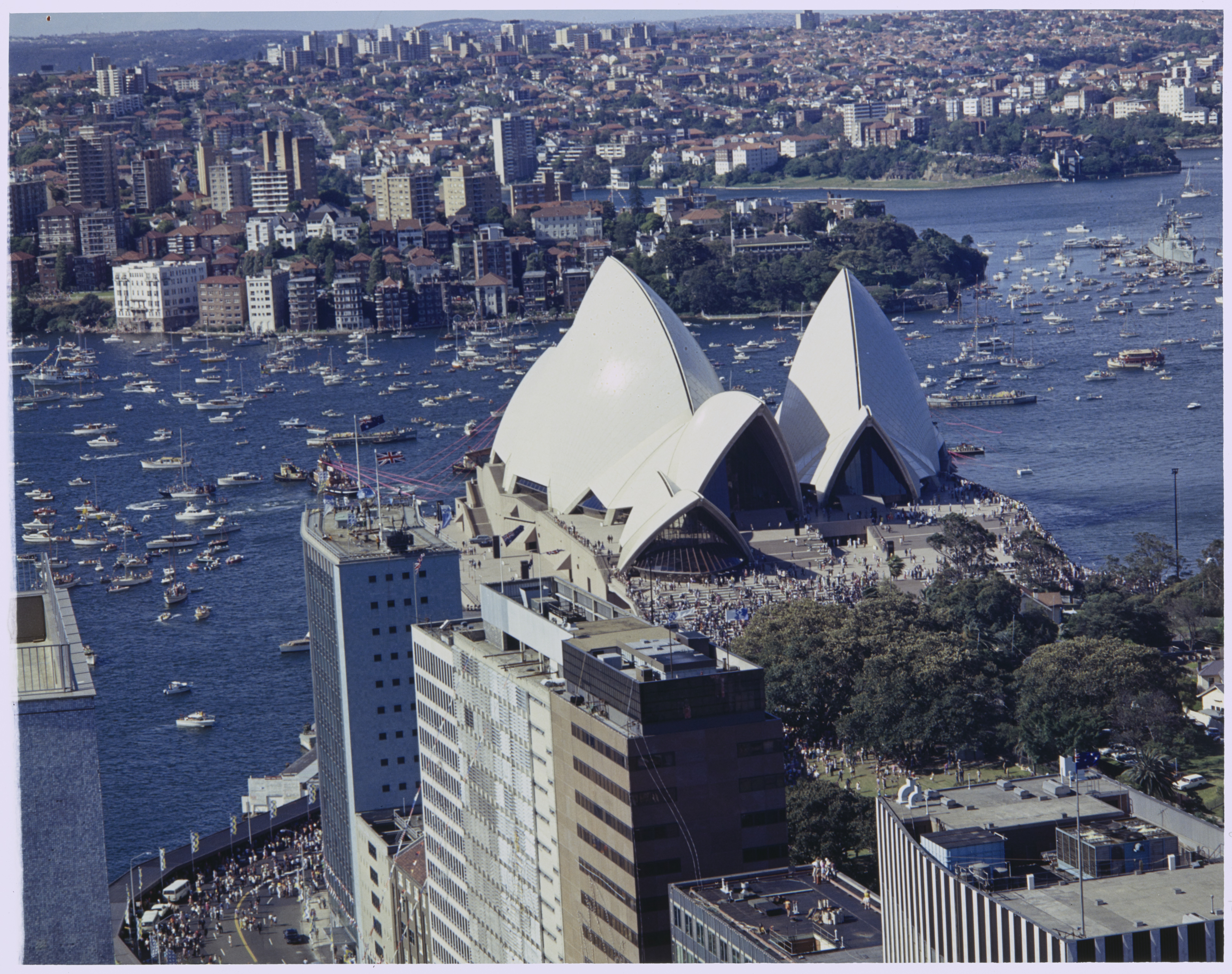
Opening, Sydney Opera House, 1973

The Sydney Opera House was formally opened by Queen Elizabeth II, on 20 October 1973. A large crowd attended. The opening was televised and included fireworks and a performance of Beethoven's Symphony No. 9.

It is frequently erroneously claimed that Utzon was not invited to the opening and his name was not mentioned at the ceremony. Utzon was in fact invited, but he declined in order to avoid the controversy over his dismissal overshadowing the event; and while the Queen's speech did not mention Utzon (or any other involved architect), Premier Askin did credit him.

=== Reconciliation with Utzon; building refurbishment ===
In the late 1990s, the Sydney Opera House Trust resumed communication with Utzon in an attempt to effect a reconciliation and to secure his involvement in future changes to the building. In 1999, he was appointed by the trust as a design consultant for future work.

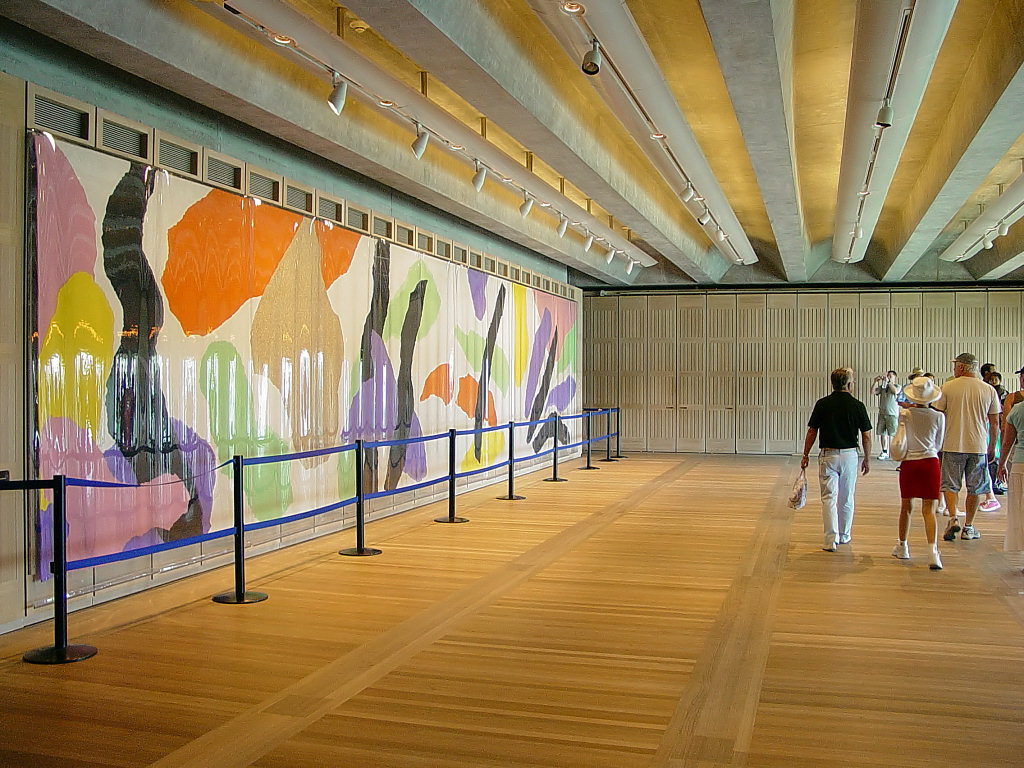
The Utzon Room: rebuilt under Utzon in 2000 with his tapestry, Homage to Carl Philipp Emanuel Bach

In 2004, the first interior space rebuilt to an Utzon design was opened and renamed "The Utzon Room" in his honour. It contains an original Utzon tapestry (14.00 × 3.70 metres) called Homage to Carl Philipp Emanuel Bach. In April 2007, he proposed a major reconstruction of the Opera Theatre, as it was then known. Utzon died on 29 November 2008, having never returned to Australia to see the completed Opera House.

A state memorial service, attended by Utzon's son Jan and daughter Lin, was held in the Concert Hall on 25 March 2009 featuring performances, readings and recollections from prominent figures in the Australian performing arts scene.

Refurbished Western Foyer and accessibility improvements were commissioned on 17 November 2009, the largest building project completed since Utzon was re-engaged in 1999. Designed by Utzon and his son Jan, the project provided improved ticketing, toilet and cloaking facilities. New escalators and a public lift enabled enhanced access for the disabled and families with prams. The prominent paralympian athlete Louise Sauvage was announced as the building's "accessibility ambassador" to advise on further improvements to aid people with disabilities.

In 2013, a 60-metre long artwork by artist Reg Mombassa was unveiled at the Sydney Opera House. The Gumscape, Road and Creatures triptych was commissioned by the Sydney Opera House to cover the scaffolding concealing refurbishment building work.

On 29 March 2016, an original 1959 tapestry by Le Corbusier (2.18 × 3.55 metres), commissioned by Utzon to be hung in the Sydney Opera House and called Les Dés Sont Jetés (The Dice Are Cast), was finally unveiled in situ after being owned by the Utzon family and held at their home in Denmark for over 50 years. The tapestry was bought at auction by the Sydney Opera House in June 2015. It now hangs in the building's Western Foyer and is accessible to the public.

In the second half of 2017, the Joan Sutherland Theatre was closed to replace the stage machinery and for other works.

=== Architectural design role of Peter Hall ===
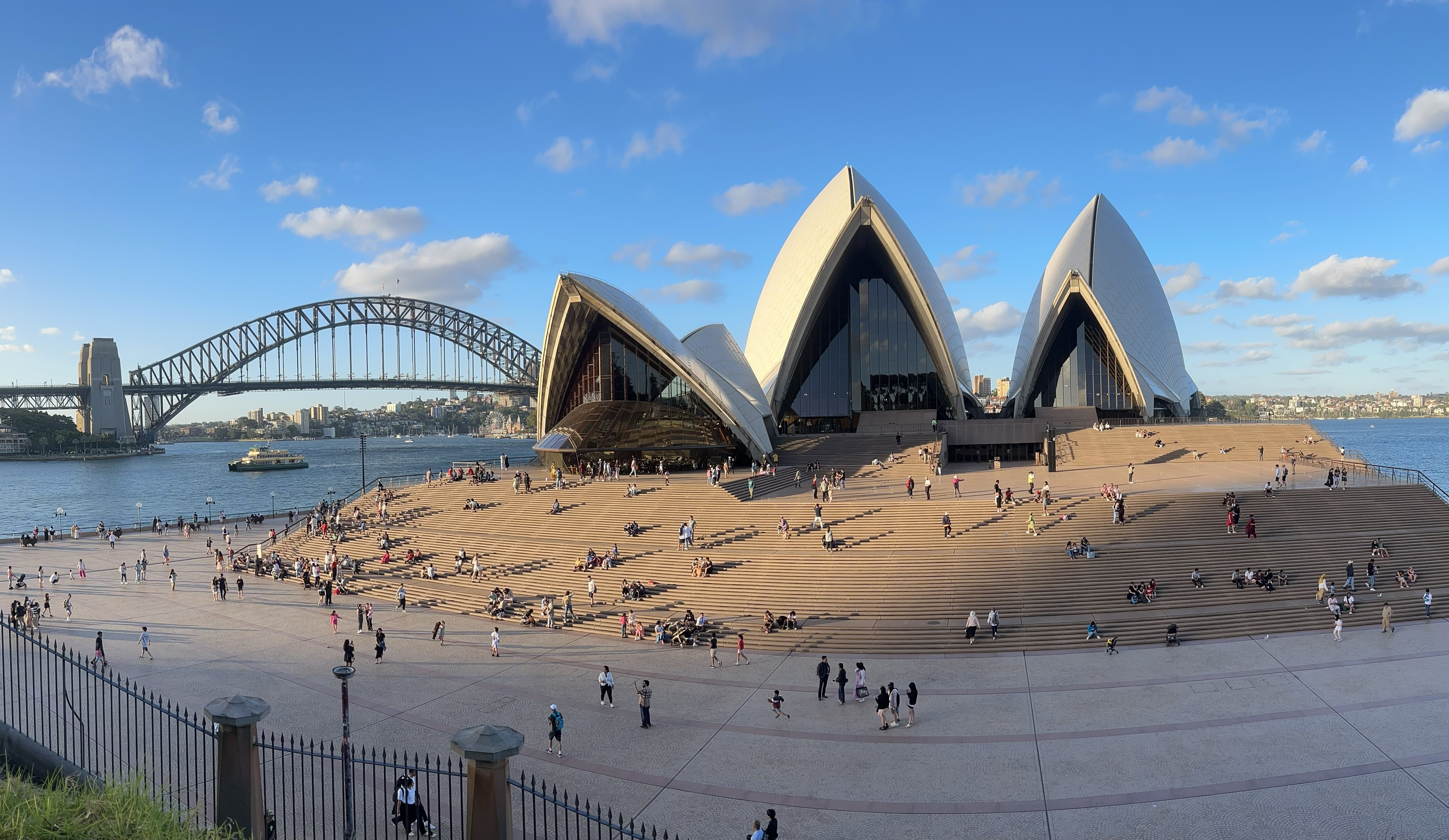
Panoramic view of the Sydney Opera House and Sydney Harbour Bridge

After the resignation of Utzon, the Minister for Public Works, Davis Hughes, and the Government Architect, Ted Farmer, organised a team to bring the Sydney Opera House to completion. The architectural work was divided between three appointees who became the Hall, Todd, Littlemore partnership. David Littlemore would manage construction supervision, Lionel Todd contract documentation, while the crucial role of design became the responsibility of Peter Hall.

Hall completed a combined arts and architecture degree at Sydney University. Upon graduation a travel scholarship enabled him to spend twelve months in Europe during which time he visited Utzon in Hellebæk. Returning to Sydney, Hall worked for the Government Architect, a branch of the NSW Public Works Department. While there he established himself as a talented design architect with a number of court and university buildings, including the Goldstein Hall at the University of New South Wales, which won the Sir John Sulman Medal in 1964.

Hall resigned from the Government Architects office in early 1966 to pursue his own practice. When approached to take on the design role, (after at least two prominent Sydney architects had declined), Hall spoke with Utzon by phone before accepting the position. Utzon reportedly told Hall: he (Hall) would not be able to finish the job and the Government would have to invite him back. Hall also sought the advice of others, including architect Don Gazzard who warned him acceptance would be a bad career move as the project would "never be his own".

Hall agreed to accept the role on the condition there was no possibility of Utzon returning. Even so, his appointment did not go down well with many of his fellow architects who considered that no one but Utzon should complete the Sydney Opera House. Upon Utzon's dismissal, a rally of protest had marched to Bennelong Point. A petition was also circulated, including in the Government Architects office. Peter Hall was one of the many who had signed the petition that called for Utzon's reinstatement.

When Hall agreed to the design role and was appointed in April 1966, he imagined he would find the design and documentation for the Stage III well advanced. What he found was an enormous amount of work ahead of him with many aspects completely unresolved by Utzon in relation to seating capacity, acoustics and structure. In addition Hall found the project had proceeded for nine years without the development of a concise client brief. To bring himself up to speed, Hall investigated concert and opera venues overseas and engaged stage consultant Ben Schlange and acoustic consultant Wilhelm Jordan, while establishing his team. In consultation with all the potential building users, the first Review of Program was completed in January 1967. The most significant conclusion reached by Hall was that concert and opera were incompatible in the same hall. Although Utzon had sketched ideas using plywood for the great enclosing glass walls, their structural viability was unresolved when Hall took on the design role. With the ability to delegate tasks and effectively coordinate the work of consultants, Hall guided the project for over five years until the opening day in 1973.

A former Government Architect, Peter Webber, in his book Peter Hall: the Phantom of the Opera House, concludes: when Utzon resigned no one was better qualified (than Hall) to rise to the challenge of completing the design of the Opera House.

=== Iraq war protest ===
In 2003, the Opera House was vandalised by Dave Burgess and Will Saunders with red paint saying "No War" in an act of protest against the Iraq War.

== Performance firsts ==
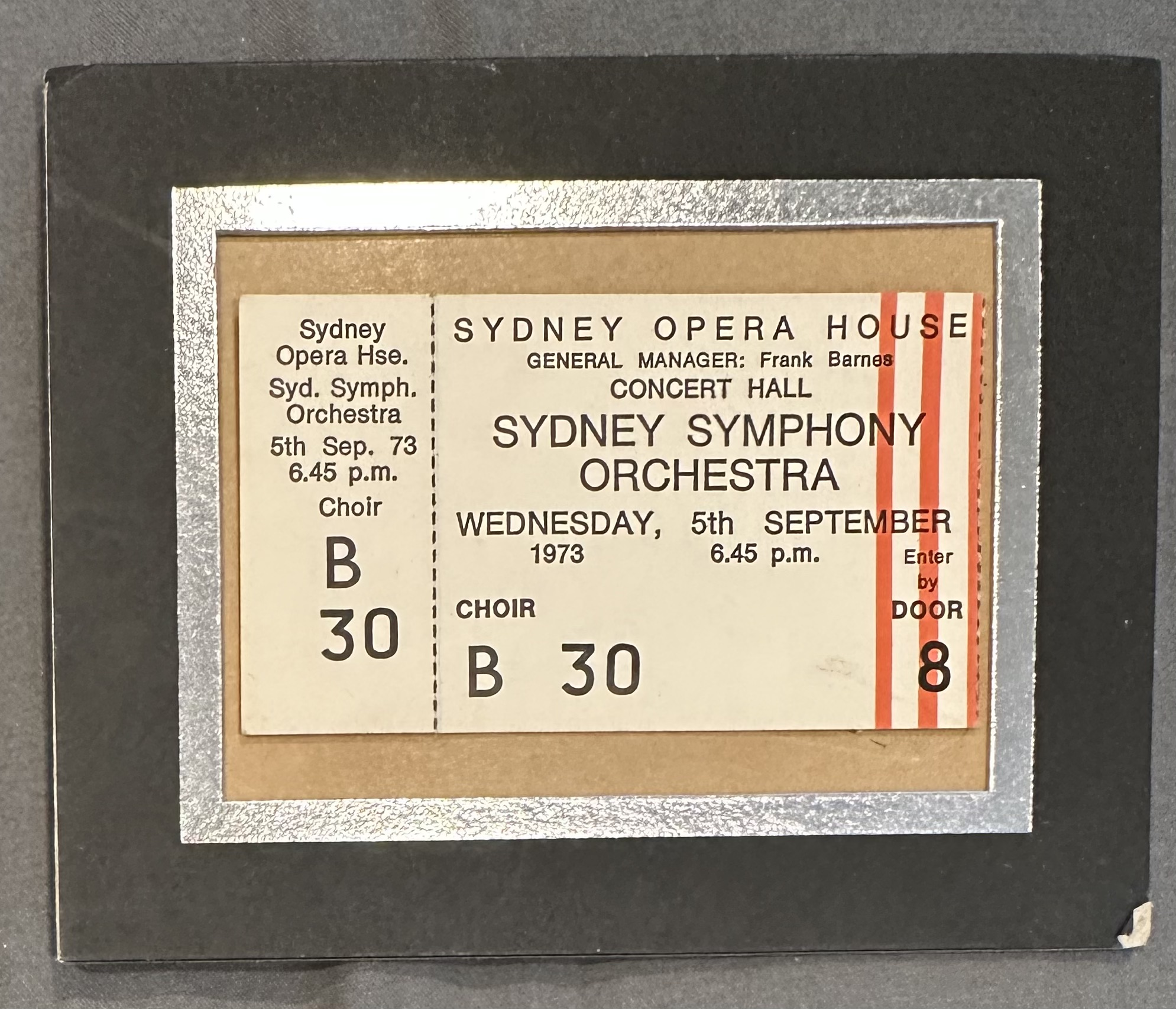
Ticket for the first performance at the Sydney Opera House Concert Hall, September 1973

During the construction phase, lunchtime performances were often arranged for the workers, with American vocalist Paul Robeson the first artist to perform, in 1960.

Various performances were presented prior to the official opening:

- The first solo piano recital was in the Concert Hall on 10 April 1973, played by Romola Costantino to an invited audience.
- The first performance of an opera was Larry Sitsky's The Fall of the House of Usher (1965), to a libretto by Mary Durack, in a double-bill with Dalgerie by James Penberthy, conducted by Rex Hobcroft; it took place on 25 July 1973.
- The first opera to be performed in what was then known as the Opera Theatre was Sergei Prokofiev's War and Peace, on 28 September 1973, conducted by the Australian Opera's Music Director, Edward Downes and produced by Sam Wanamaker. It had been intended that Peter Sculthorpe's work Rites of Passage would have this honour, but it was not ready on time. Rites of Passage was premiered a year later, on 27 September 1974.
- The first public concert in the Concert Hall took place on 5 September 1973. It was an all-Wagner orchestral concert performed by the Sydney Symphony Orchestra, conducted by Charles Mackerras and with Birgit Nilsson as the soprano soloist. The first music played was the Prelude to Die Meistersinger von Nürnberg. The concert closed with the Immolation Scene from Götterdämmerung.

After the opening:

- The first violin and piano recital was given by Wanda Wiłkomirska, with pianist Geoffrey Parsons.

== Public and commemorative events ==
In 1993, Constantine Koukias was commissioned by the Sydney Opera House Trust in association with REM Theatre to compose Icon, a large-scale music theatre piece for the 20th anniversary of the Sydney Opera House.

During the 2000 Summer Olympics, the venue served as the focal point for the triathlon events. The event had a 1.5 km (0.9 mi) swimming loop at Farm Cove, along with competitions in the neighbouring Royal Botanical Gardens for the cycling and running portions of the event.

In 2006, tiles from the Sydney Opera House were added to the facade of the Tribune Tower in Chicago.

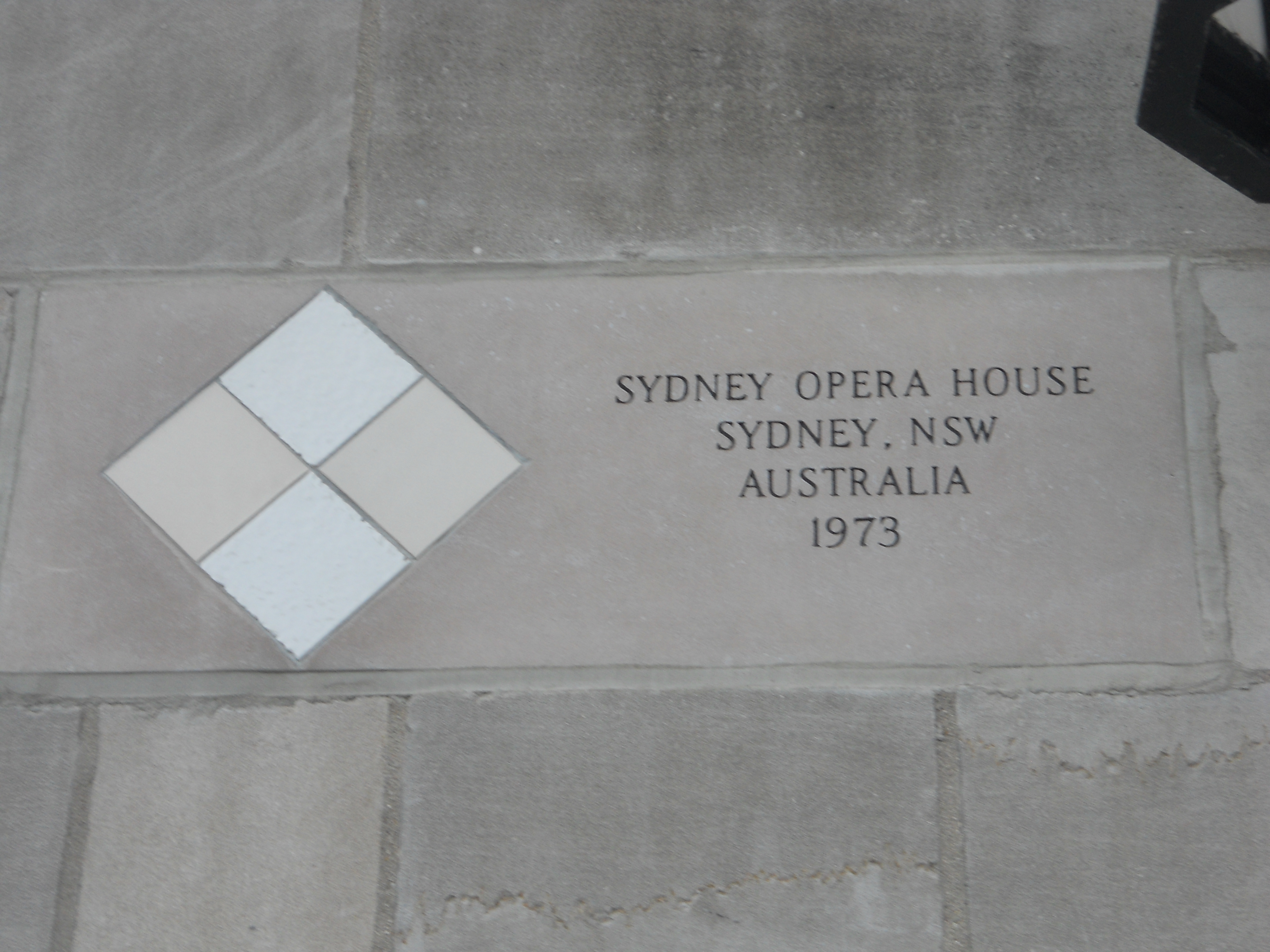
Tiles from the Sydney Opera House embedded in the facade of the Tribune Tower in Chicago

Since 2013, a group of residents from the nearby Bennelong Apartments, calling themselves the Sydney Opera House Concerned Citizens Group, have been campaigning against Forecourt Concerts on the grounds that they exceed noise levels outlined in the development approval (DA). In February 2017 the Department of Planning and & Environment handed down a $15,000 fine to the Sydney Opera House for breach of allowed noise levels at a concert held in November 2015. However, the DA was amended in 2016 to allow an increase in noise levels in the forecourt by 5 decibels. The residents opposing the concerts contend that a new DA should have been filed rather than an amendment.

The Sydney Opera House sails formed a graphic projection-screen in a lightshow mounted in connection with the International Fleet Review in Sydney Harbour on 5 October 2013.

On 31 December 2013, the venue's 40th anniversary year, a New Year fireworks display was mounted for the first time in a decade. The Sydney Opera House hosted an event, 'the biggest blind date' on Friday 21 February 2014 that won an historic Guinness World Record. The longest continuous serving employee was commemorated on 27 June 2018, for 50 years of service.

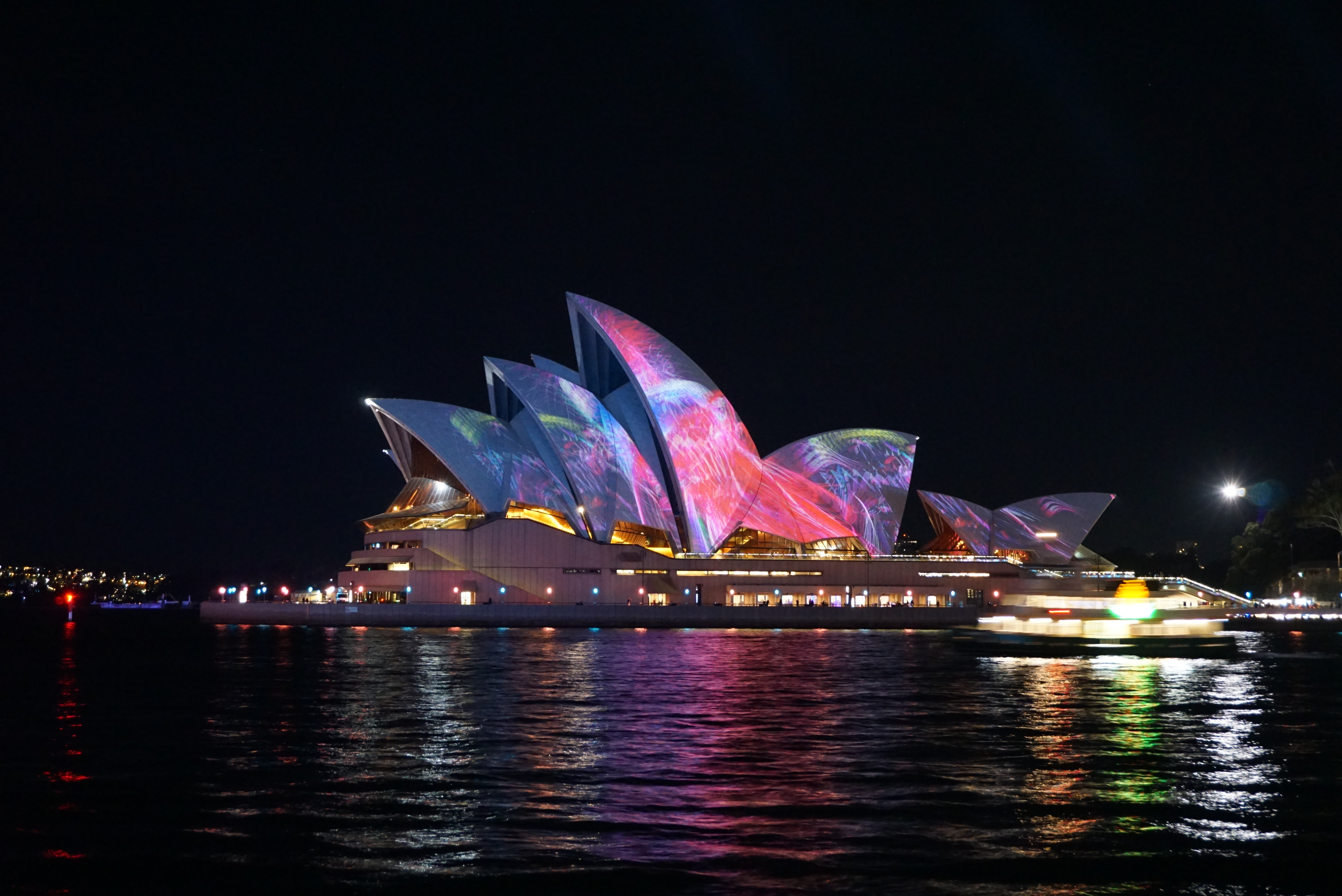
The Sydney Opera House during Vivid Sydney (2019)

On 14 June 2019, a state memorial service for former Australian Prime Minister Bob Hawke was held at the Sydney Opera House.

On 20 October 2023, the Opera House turned 50 years old.

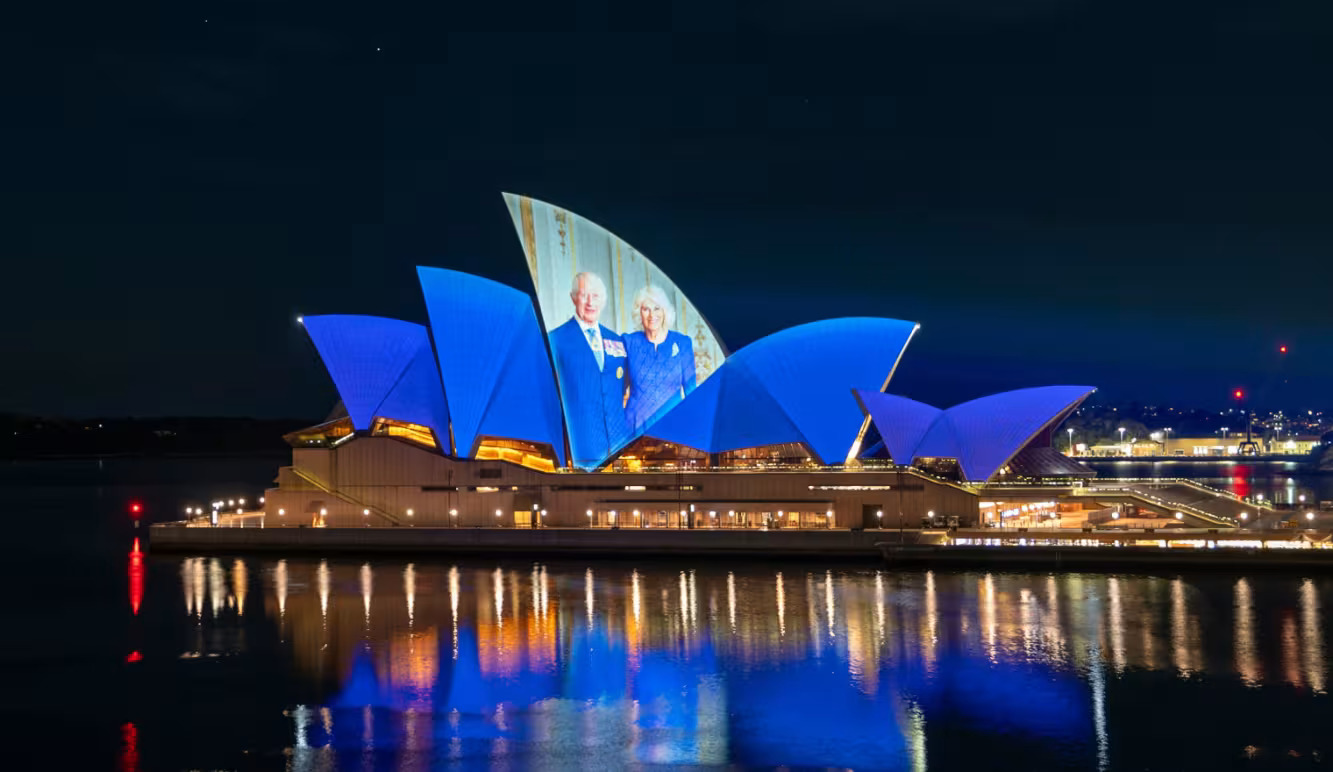
The Opera House lit up for the 2024 royal tour of Australia

In December 2024, after five years of absence, the Nutcracker returned to the Sydney Opera house. The new production, which is directed by David Hallberg, brings interactions with the contemporary audiences to the classic ballet.

== Controversies ==
The Opera House chief executive Louise Herron clashed with Sydney radio commentator Alan Jones on 5 October 2018. Jones called for her sacking for refusing to allow Racing NSW to use the Opera House sails to advertise The Everest horse race. Within hours, NSW Premier Gladys Berejiklian overruled Herron. Two days later, Prime Minister Scott Morrison supported the decision, calling the Opera House "the biggest billboard Sydney has". The NSW Labor Party leader, Luke Foley, and senior federal Labor frontbencher Anthony Albanese had supported the proposal. The political view was not supported by significant public opinion, with a petition against the advertising collecting over 298,000 names by 9 October 2018. 235,000 printed petition documents were presented to the NSW Parliament in the morning. A survey conducted on 8 October by market research firm Micromex found that 81% of those surveyed were not supportive of the premier's direction.

=== Coronation controversy ===
In 2023, the New South Wales Government scrapped plans to light the sails of the Sydney Opera House in honour of the coronation of King Charles. State Premier Chris Minns argued that the sails had been lit up too often and was costing significant taxpayer money, stating that the cost was somewhere between eighty and one hundred thousand dollars.

== Notable performances ==
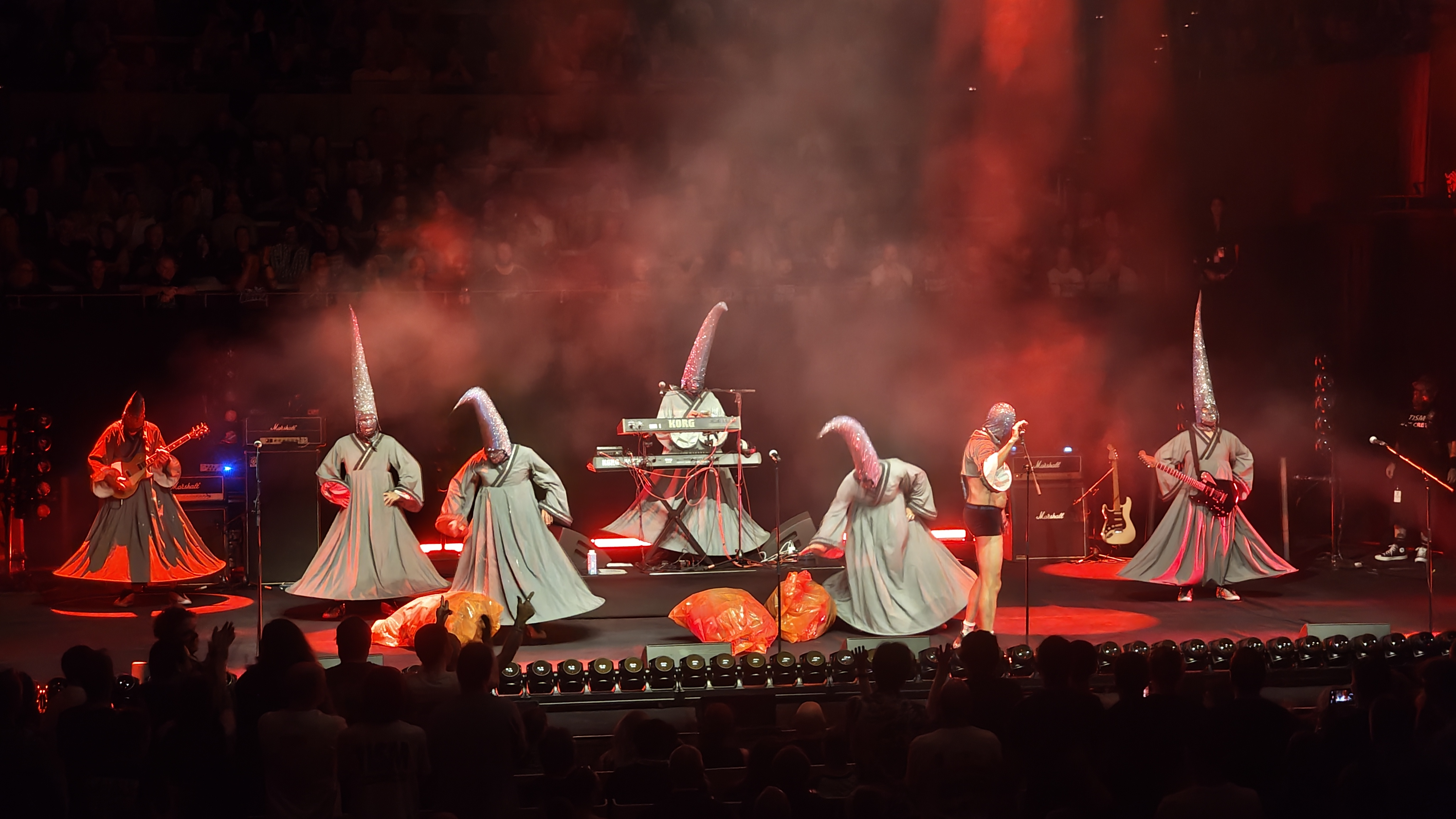
TISM performing at the Sydney Opera House, April 10, 2026. The band were fined A$18,488.80 ex-GST for damages occurred during the show.

- 1960 – The first person to perform at the Sydney Opera House was Paul Robeson – he sang "Ol' Man River" to the construction workers as they ate lunch.
- 1973 – Sergei Prokofiev's War and Peace, on 28 September 1973.
- 1974 – Opera singer Joan Sutherland performed for the first time in the theatre that would be named for her.
- 1977 – Sammy Davis Junior played at the Sydney Opera House on April 9.
- 1978 – Irish rockers Thin Lizzy played a free concert on the steps, which was recorded and released as Thin Lizzy Live at Sydney Harbour '78.
- 1980 – Arnold Schwarzenegger won his final body-building title there.
- 1987 – Pope John Paul II gave a speech in the Concert Hall during his visit to Australia.
- 1990 – Nelson Mandela addressed a crowd of 40,000 and attended a choral performance of Nkosi Sikelel' iAfrica ("God Bless Africa").
- 1995 – Bernard Shaw's Saint Joan: starring Jacqueline McKenzie in the title role of Joan of Arc.
- 1996 – Crowded House played their record-breaking Farewell to the World concert on the steps.
- 2000 – Swimmer Samantha Riley stands on top of one of the Concert Hall's shells with the Olympic Torch, before sending the flame on its final journey to light the cauldron at Stadium Australia.
- 2003 – Pulitzer Prize winning play Proof by David Auburn, starring Jacqueline McKenzie and Barry Otto.
- 2008 – Premiere performance of "Angels in the Architecture" by Frank Ticheli, a wind band composition inspired by the opera house itself. Conducted by Matthew George.
- 2008 – "Slaughter at the Opera" skateboarding competition held on the forecourt and front steps, 1 March.
- 2009 – First Vivid Live Music program curated by Brian Eno.
- 2010 – Massive Attack performed on 16 March.
- 2011 – Oprah Winfrey filmed her Ultimate Australian Adventure in the forecourt.
- 2014 – Bob Dylan ends his Australian Tour on 7 September 2014.
- 2026 - Melbourne band TISM played the first of two shows at the Sydney Opera House on April 10, 2026 (the second on April 12). Due to "uncontrolled audience interaction" including "props and costumes thrown into the audience," "jumping between stage and audience areas" and "performance and audience members walking and standing on seats," TISM were fined A$18,488.80 ex-GST for damages to the venue. The band attempted to defer responsibility, issuing a statement reading "[We] don't know who is to blame," and noted that "on Saturday April 11 Sir Donald Runnicles led the Sydney Symphony Orchestra in a dramatic performance of Mahler’s ‘Sixth Symphony’ in the Concert Hall, featuring the legendary, pounding ‘hammer blows of fate’. Enough said."

== Awards ==
- RAIA Merit Award, 1974
- Meritorious Lighting Award of the Illuminating Engineering Society of Australia, 1974
- RAIA Civic Design Award, 1980
- RAIA Commemorative Award, Jørn Utzon – Sydney Opera House, 1992
- National Award for Enduring Architecture, 2003
- New South Wales Enduring Architecture Award, 2003
- NSW Architecture Medallion, 2023 (Renewal by Ashton Raggatt McDougall)
- Greenway Award for Heritage, 2023 (NSW)
- John Verge Award for Interior Architecture, 2023 (NSW)
- Emil Sodersten Award for Interior Architecture, 2023
- Lachlan Macquarie Award for Heritage, 2023

== See also ==
- Auditorio de Tenerife – a modern structure in Canary Islands, Spain with a similar design
- Palau de les Arts Reina Sofía – a modern structure in Valencia, Spain with a similar design
- Clyde Auditorium – a modern structure in Scotland with a visually similar design
- Lotus Temple – a modern structure in India with a similar design
- Australian landmarks
- List of official openings by Elizabeth II in Australia
- Man O'War Steps
- Wonders of the World
- Mathematics and art
- Murder of Graeme Thorne
- Opera in Australia
- List of World Heritage Sites in Australia

== Bibliography ==
- Drew, Philip, "The Masterpiece: Jørn Utzon: a secret life", Hardie Grant Books, 1999, ISBN 1864980478.
- Duek-Cohen, Elias, Utzon and the Sydney Opera House, Morgan Publications, Sydney, 1967–1998. (A small publication intended to gather public opinion to bring Utzon back to the project.)
- Hubble, Ava, The Strange Case of Eugene Goossens and Other Tales from The Opera House, Collins Publishers, Australia, 1988. (Ava Hubble was Press Officer for the Sydney Opera House for 15 years.)
- Opera House an architectural "tragedy", ABC News Online, 28 April 2005.
- Murray, Peter "The Saga of Sydney Opera House: The Dramatic Story of the Design and Construction of the Icon of Modern Australia", Publisher Taylor & Francis, 2004, ISBN 0415325226, 9780415325226
- Pitt, Helen (2018). The House: The Dramatic Story of the Sydney Opera House and the People who Made it. Allen & Unwin. ISBN 978-1-76029-546-2.
- Stübe, Katarina and Utzon, Jan, Sydney Opera House: A Tribute to Jørn Utzon. Reveal Books, 2009. ISBN 978-0-9806123-0-1
- Stuber, Fritz, "Sydney's Opera House—Not a World Heritage Item? – Open letter to the Hon. John W. Howard, Prime Minister", in: Australian Planner (Sydney), Vol. 35, No. 3, 1998 (p. 116); Architecture + Design (New Delhi), Vol. XV, No. 5, 1998 (pp. 12–14); Collage (Berne), No. 3, 1998, (pp. 33–34, 1 ill.).
- Watson, Anne (editor), "Building a Masterpiece: The Sydney Opera House", Lund Humphries, 2006, ISBN 0-85331-941-3, ISBN 978-0-85331-941-2.
- Watson, Anne, ed. (2013). Building a Masterpiece – The Sydney Opera House – Lessons in Space and Environment (Hardback) (40th Anniversary ed.). Sydney: Powerhouse Publishing. ISBN 978-1-86317-152-6.
- Webber, Peter, "Peter Hall: The Phantom of the Opera House", The Watermark Press, 2012, ISBN 978-0-949284-95-2.
- Woolley, Ken, Reviewing the performance: the design of the Sydney Opera House, The Watermark Press, 2010, ISBN 9780949284921.
- Yeomans, John (1973), Building the Sydney Opera House, Hornibrook Group, ISBN 978-0-9598748-0-8
- Yeomans, John (1973), The other Taj Mahal : what happened to the Sydney Opera House (New ed.), Longman Australia, ISBN 978-0-582-71209-6
- Yeomans, John (1973), A guide to the Sydney Opera House, Sydney Opera House Trust

== Archival holdings ==
- NRS 12825 – Competition drawings submitted by Jørn Utzon to the Opera House Committee, 1956. Held by New South Wales State Archives and Records.
