= Opera in Australia =

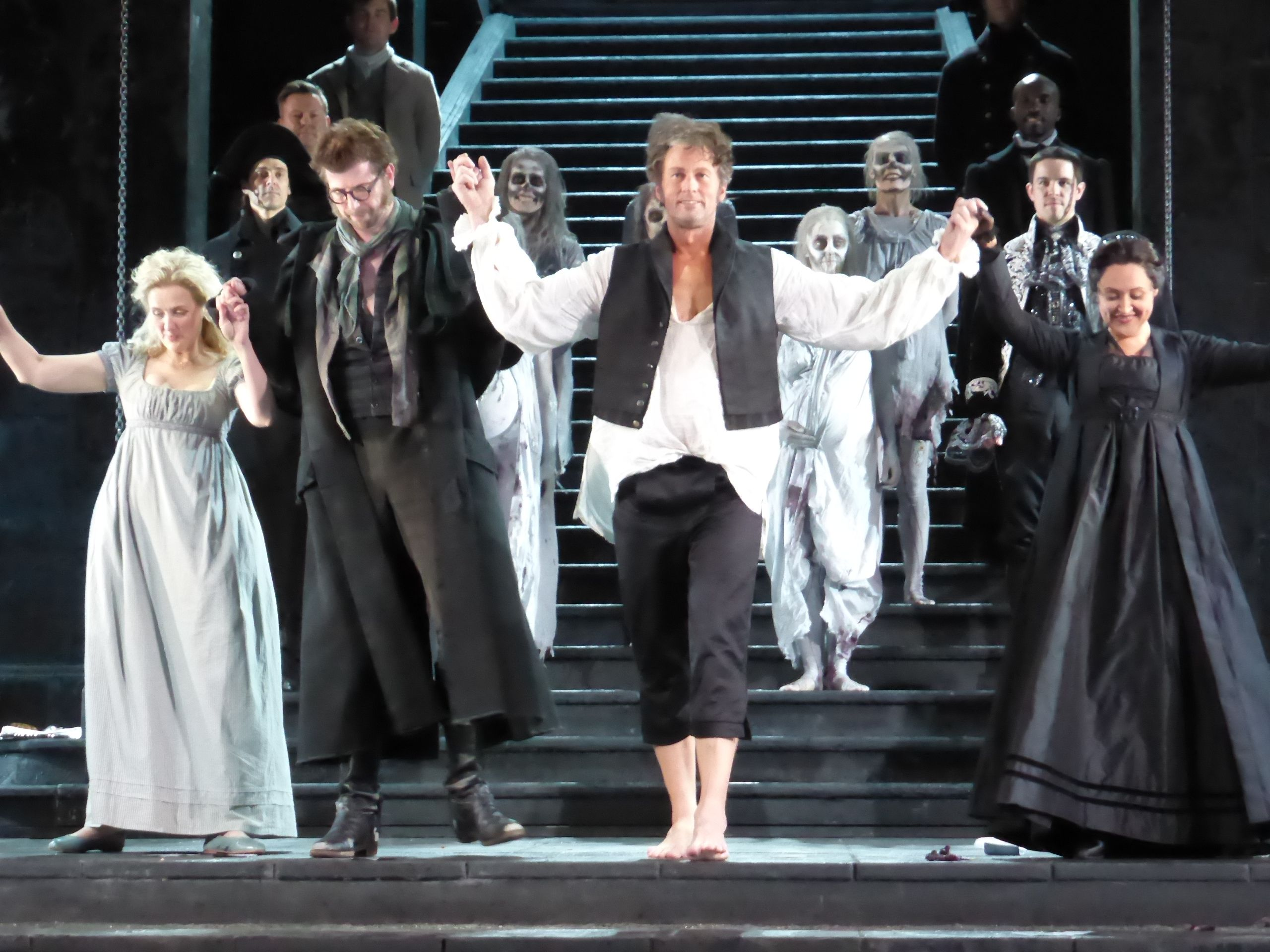
Curtain call after Don Giovanni at the Sydney Opera House, 2014

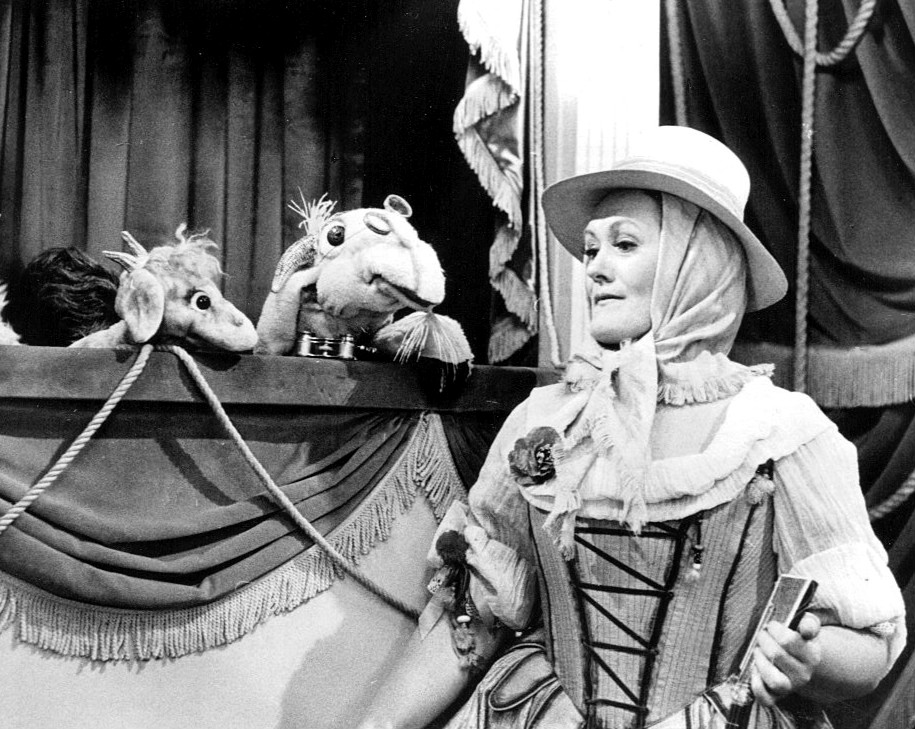
Joan Sutherland in a 1972 US TV production of La Périchole

Opera was introduced to Australia by European settlers in the 19th century. The first opera performances were staged in the early 1800s, often by touring companies from Europe. It quickly became a significant part of the culture of Australia. A strong network of conservatories and training programs supports the tradition today. Several opera houses exist in both Sydney and Melbourne.

== History ==
The first opera written, composed and produced in Australia was Isaac Nathan's Don John of Austria at the Royal Victoria Theatre, Sydney, in May 1847.

West Australian Opera has been based in Perth since 1967. The establishment of the Sydney Opera House in 1973 was a significant historical event. The Opera House is home to Opera Australia, founded in 1956, the country's principal opera company. They also produce operas at the Arts Centre Melbourne. Opera Australia is the largest performing arts employer in Australia. State Opera of South Australia is a professional opera company in Adelaide that was established in 1976.

Opera Queensland was established in 1981. In 1982, the first live broadcast of an opera from the Sydney Opera House brought Die Fledermaus into Australian living rooms. The Opera Awards is a singing competition for professional Australian opera singers. It was established in 1986. Victorian Opera is based in Melbourne and was founded in 2005.

== Opera singers ==
Nellie Melba, Australia's Queen of Song, established a worldwide reputation and acted as a pioneer for other female singers to follow in her footsteps. Melba is one of Australia's most famous cultural icons and exports and is featured on the Australian one-hundred-dollar note.

Joan Sutherland was the leading dramatic coloratura soprano of the 20th century. She was the first Australian to receive a Grammy Award.

== Opera directors ==
Moffatt Oxenbould was Opera Australia's artistic director for 15 years in the 1980s and 90s. He was followed by Simone Young as musical director from 2001 until 2002, and Stuart Maunder as artistic director from 2001 until 2008, Richard Hickox as music director from 2005 until his death in 2008, then Lyndon Terracini as artistic director from 2009 until his resignation in 2022.

== See also ==
- Australian classical music
- Opera in The Domain
- Performing arts in Australia
