= Knox Grammar School =

Location
- 2 Borambil Street; Wahroonga, New South Wales, 2076; Australia; 33°43′24″S 151°7′11″E

Information
- Type: Independent, day & boarding
- Motto: Latin: Virile Agitur (The Manly Thing Is Being Done)
- Denomination: Uniting Church Presbyterianism (De Facto)
- Established: 1924; 102 years ago
- Founder: John Gilmore, William McIlrath, Robert Gillespie and Andrew Reid
- Chairman: Simon Rothery
- Headmaster: Scott James
- Chaplain: Rev Dr Rosalie Clarke MacLarty
- Employees: ~278
- Years: K–12
- Gender: Male
- Enrolment: ~3,170 (2021)
- Colours: Black and blue
- Rival: Barker College
- Affiliation: Combined Associated Schools
- Alumni: Old Knox Grammarians
- Website: www.knox.nsw.edu.au

Knox Grammar School is an independent Uniting Church day and boarding school for boys, officially located in Wahroonga, with the majority of its campus situated in the neighbouring suburb of Warrawee, on Sydney's Upper North Shore, New South Wales, Australia. Founded in 1924 by the Presbyterian Church of Australia as an all-boys school named after John Knox. The school has since grown, branching out into a large Senior School and a Preparatory School, enrolling approximately 3,345 students. The school also caters for approximately 210 boarding students from Years 7 to 12.

Knox is affiliated with the Headmasters' and Headmistresses' Conference, the Association of Heads of Independent Schools of Australia (AHISA), the Junior School Heads Association of Australia (JSHAA), the Australian Boarding Schools' Association (ABSA), and is a founding member of the Combined Associated Schools (CAS).

== History ==
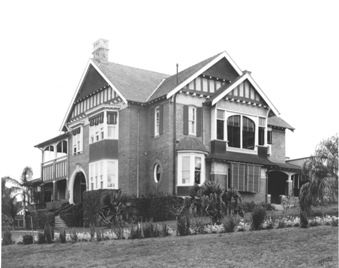
'Earlston' (now Gillespie Heritage House), c. 1923

Knox Grammar School was established on Sydney's North Shore in 1924, by the Presbyterian Church. The school was named after John Knox, the 16th century Scottish reformer, who planned a network of schools in every church parish.

Knox opened as a Presbyterian Boys' School after founding members John Gilmore, William McIlrath, Robert Gillespie and Andrew Reid purchased the original property, 'Earlston', as the first school building. Now the Gillespie Heritage House, 'Earlston' was previously owned by Sir Charles Mackellar, was designed by architects Spain & Cosh, and built in 1908 for W. Moses Esq., Warrawee.

The school was officially opened by the Hon. Sir George Fuller KCMG, Premier of New South Wales, on 5 February 1924. Under the founding headmaster Neil MacNeil, a Rhodes Scholar, Knox grew rapidly and survived the Great Depression. From 1924 to 1939 when MacNeil's time as headmaster ended the school's enrolment had risen from 28 to 300 students.

== Headmasters ==
The first Headmaster of Knox was Neil MacNeil, a Rhodes scholar from Victoria. During his time as Headmaster, Knox grew in academic achievement and the campus and facilities were expanded. MacNeil guided Knox through the Great Depression which started during the initial founding years of the school. When the school opened, only 28 students attended Knox, by the end of Neil MacNeil's time as Headmaster in 1939, the amount of students had risen to over 300.

In 1939, William Bryden FRSE (1904–1992) took over the role of headmaster. As World War II broke out, around 370 Old Knox Grammarians served in the armed forces. 53 of them lost their lives and are now commemorated in the John Williams Memorial Hall, the School Chapel, the Old Students' War Memorial, and the original Science Building. The school's Pipe Band was established during Bryden's period as headmaster. John Mill Couper, a Scot, became headmaster in 1953. Couper focused on broadening the School's education, with attention to music and art, however, problems culminated in Couper's departure from a divided Knox in 1955.

Dr John Couper succeed Bryden as the third Headmaster of Knox. Couper built on the school's concept of education, paying attention to the performing arts and creative arts of the school. During his time as headmaster, Dr. Couper was able to develop the house system into what it is seen as today.

T. Ross McKenzie, former head of Brisbane Boys' College, replaced Couper.

Dr. Ian Paterson was the fifth headmaster of Knox Grammar School and has been the longest serving headmaster to date. During his time as headmaster he made many changes to the school including a new buildings: the Reid Industrial Arts Building, the Lawson Sports Centre, and the Music Centre. This greatly changed the school building it into what it is today.

Paterson improved the Creative Arts and Performing Arts areas of the school with the introduction of specialist teachers. He started outdoor education programs. During this period three teachers sexually abused students; these teachers were later convicted and it has been alleged that other teachers abused students. In 2015 Paterson told the Royal Commission into Institutional Responses to Child Sexual Abuse that he had failed to protect students from abuse.

In 2018, Scott James, who was formerly the deputy headmaster, became Knox's eighth headmaster, succeeding John Weeks.

=== Headmasters ===
Period	Details
1924–1939	Neil MacNeil
1939–1953	William Bryden CBE
1954–1955	John Mill Couper
1956–1969	T. Ross McKenzie OBE
1969–1998	Ian Paterson AM
1999–2003	Peter Crawley
2004–2018	John Weeks
2018–Present	Scott James

== Motto ==
Knox Grammar School’s motto, Virile Agitur, is a Latin phrase that has traditionally been rendered in English as “Do the Manly Thing” (most common in the Preparatory School) or “The manly thing is being done.” The phrase draws the New Testament exhortation 1 Corinthians 16:13–14, where St Paul urges believers to “be on your guard; stand firm in the faith; be courageous; be strong” and to “do everything in love.”

In the context of Knox’s founding by the Presbyterian Church in 1924, the motto was chosen to reflect a Christian ideal of disciplined, courageous manhood grounded in faith and service. The biblical underpinning connects the “manly thing” not only to masculinity or toughness, but to the Pauline call to live with integrity, courage and love in all aspects of life - academic, spiritual and communal - which continues to shape the school’s ethos today.

== Campus ==
There are several locations throughout Sydney being part of Knox Grammar School, with the main two campus located in the suburb Wahroonga. The two main campuses are the Knox Grammar Senior School (Years 7 to 12), located on the railway side of the Pacific Highway, and the Knox Grammar Preparatory School (Years Kindergarten to 6), located on Billyard Avenue. The smallest campus is Wahroonga Preparatory School, a small co-educational school located next to Wahroonga Park.

=== Facilities ===
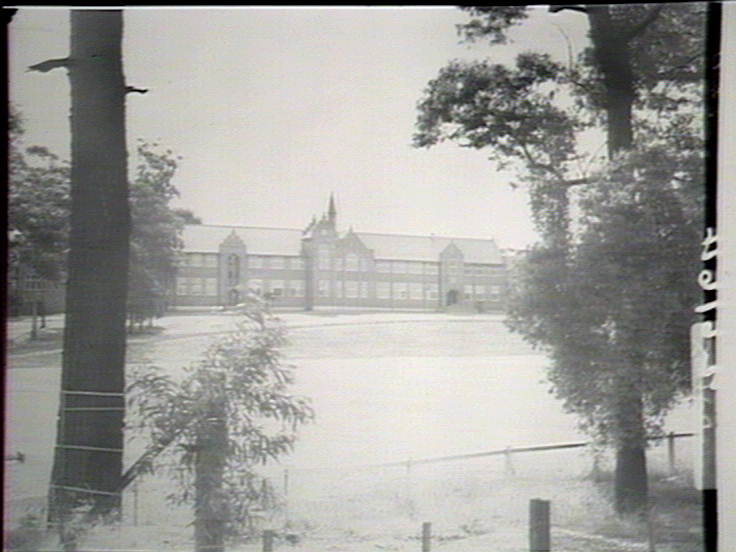
Knox Grammar School, 1943

Knox's senior campus includes the Great Hall and Aquatic Centre (opened August 2011), sports facility, gymnasium, squash and weights rooms, music and drama centres, two boarding houses (one opened September 2010) and the new performing arts academy (opened late 2019). Knox owns several major sporting fields including one on campus at the Senior School, two on campus at the Prep School, and two off campus in Warrawee and neighbouring North Turramurra.

Since 2006 the school has been actively involved in the Future Problem Solving Program.

=== Building projects ===
Knox has in recent years completed new buildings at both the Senior and Prep Schools. The Senior School's KG1 Building opened in 2007. The KG1 Project The Prep School's K-2 Centre, opened in 2004, provided new classroom, library, art and music facilities for Years K-2 students.

The new Boarding Centre was finished in September 2010. The Great Hall and Aquatic Centre project, was finished in August 2011 and won design awards in 2012.

Construction for the new Knox Senior Student Academy began in 2014, with construction continuing to August 2015 and the academy being officially opened in October 2015. The building houses the lockers of Year 11 and Year 12 students, as well as featuring a cafe, classrooms for Science as well as Finance and Legal classrooms, a Senior Library and a Lecture theatre.

In 2016, Headmaster John Weeks announced that Knox Grammar School would commence construction of a new Performing Arts Centre and Junior Secondary Academy in February 2017, known as the Junior Performing Arts Centre (JPAC). It was completed in early 2019.

The Senior School's construction for a new locker area for Years 7–10 as well as a basketball court, which is in the process of refurbishing the KG1 Building for the new Middle Academy, was completed in early 2020.

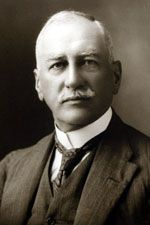
Sir Robert Gillespie, a founder of Knox, c. 1920s

== Co-curriculum ==
=== Knox Ravenswood Army Cadet Unit ===
The Knox Ravenswood Army Cadet Unit (KRACU) comprises up to 1200+ members, ranging from recruits (RCTs) to Cadet Under Officers (CUOs). The KRACU is an Australian Army Cadet Unit within the NSW 2nd AAC BDE. Participation is compulsory from the start of Term 4 Year 8, through to the end of Term 3 Year 9 for attendees of Knox Grammar School, and offers voluntary participation for attendees at the Ravenswood School for Girls from Term 4 Year 8. After the completion of basic recruit training in their first year, cadets may decide to either discharge from the Unit, or attend a Promotion Course to attempt to attain a higher rank and/or continue into a Senior or Recruit company.

The Unit participates in combined Annual Field Exercise (AFX) at the end of Term 1, and holds its own Junior, Senior, and CUOs Promotions Courses during August each year. Additionally, the KRACU holds ceremonial parades for the Old Knox Grammarians Association (OKGA), an ANZAC Day Parade to commemorate ANZAC Day (though held several weeks after the day itself), and a Passing-Out Parade at the end of the cadet year to farewell the Year 12 members at the conclusion of their service to the Unit.

Numerous extra-curricular activities within the KRACU is also offered, including the annual Advanced Training Course (ATC). Effective from 2026, the KRACU's Advanced Training Activity (ATA) is now known as the Advanced Training Course (ATC). Alongside ATC, the KRACU also incorporates several ceremonial drill teams, including the CAS Drill Squad, the Catafalque Party and the Honour Guard.

The KRACU was formerly called the Knox Grammar School Army Cadet Unit (KGSACU), but was renamed to its current name in 2024 to "acknowledge and formalise the deep and lasting partnership between Knox and Ravenswood School for Girls".

=== Sport ===
Knox is a member of the Combined Associated Schools (CAS), and plays competitive sport against the five other member Schools namely, Barker College, Cranbrook School, St. Aloysius College, Trinity Grammar School and Waverley College. Trial and pre-season fixtures are played against the GPS and ISA Schools. Students may represent Knox in a variety of inter-school sporting fixtures played each Saturday throughout the term.

The Intra-School sporting programs includes House carnivals, Standards and Inter-School competitions open to all boys.

Participating in sport at Knox is compulsory in both the winter and summer sporting seasons.

Knox plays 5 weeks of sport against GPS schools, and then 5 weeks of sport against CAS schools

==== CAS premierships ====
Knox Grammar School has won the following CAS premierships.

- Athletics (29) – 1929, 1931, 1933, 1935, 1937, 1938, 1939, 1957, 1959, 1961, 1962, 1966, 1967, 1968, 1969, 1970, 1971, 1972, 1973, 1983, 1984, 1985, 1992, 2001, 2003, 2004, 2006, 2007, 2008
- Australian Football – 2021
- Basketball (9) — 1978, 1979, 1980, 1997, 2009, 2014, 2019, 2020, 2021, 2022, 2023
- Cricket (15) – 1936, 1940, 1941, 1991, 1993, 1996, 2004, 2005, 2008, 2009, 2010, 2011, 2012, 2014, 2016
- Cross Country (4) – 1993, 1994, 1998, 2006
- Debating (7) — 1998, 2000, 2007, 2020, 2021, 2024, 2025
- Diving (3) – 2007, 2009, 2011
- Rugby (25) – 1932, 1934, 1936, 1939, 1940, 1941, 1942, 1945, 1954, 1957, 1962, 1964, 1967, 1972, 1976, 1991, 1995, 1999, 2000, 2001, 2003, 2008, 2009, 2015, 2016
- Soccer (10) – 1993, 1999, 2000, 2005, 2006, 2012, 2014, 2016, 2020, 2022
- Swimming (37) – 1933, 1934, 1939, 1941, 1947, 1948, 1959, 1963, 1967, 1968, 1969, 1970, 1971, 1972, 1975, 1976, 1977, 1978, 1979, 1980, 1981, 1982, 1983, 1984, 1985, 1986, 1987, 1992, 2003, 2017, 2018, 2019, 2020, 2021, 2022, 2023, 2024, 2025, 2026
- Tennis Summer (20) – 1993, 1994, 1995, 1996, 1997, 1998, 1999, 2005, 2006, 2007, 2012, 2013, 2014, 2016, 2018, 2019, 2020, 2022, 2023, 2024
- Tennis Winter (10) – 2006, 2007, 2008, 2012, 2013, 2014, 2016, 2017, 2018, 2019, 2020, 2021, 2022, 2023, 2024
- Volleyball Summer (2) – 2002, 2009, 2022, 2023
- Water Polo – 2020, 2022, 2023

=== Music ===
Knox has a Gallery Choir and the Knox Symphony Orchestra (KSO). Its Symphonic Wind Ensemble (SWE) toured Spain and Portugal in December 2019. The Knox Symphony Orchestra toured Croatia, Slovenia and Italy in December 2023.

The Ronald Sharp pipe organ in the school's chapel, built in 1965, is highly significant as the first of many Baroque revival (or Orgelbewegung) mechanical action pipe organs built in Australia in the latter half of the 20th century, and is a sibling to organs in St Mary's Cathedral, Perth Concert Hall, Wollongong Town Hall, and the Sydney Opera House.

=== Knox Grammar School Pipes and Drums ===
The Knox Pipes and Drums have toured globally including to Scotland, Ireland, England and Northern Ireland. The band also competed in the 2016 and 2019 European Pipe Band Championships and All Ireland Pipe Band Championships and the 2019 Corby Highland Games. At the Corby Highland Games, The Knox Pipes and Drums won first place for every event that they entered in.

In Australia the band have been State Champions, National Champions, and Best Drum Corps. The band was crowned at Grade 4 2018 National Champions. The band competed in the 2018 Australian Pipe Band Championships at Brisbane Boys' College, Brisbane. The KGS Pipes and Drums took first place in Grade 4 for both the overall band and the Drum crops, hence the band was crowned Grade 4 National Champions. The KGS Drum Corps also won National Drumming Championships in 2016 and 2018.

== Notable alumni ==
Alumni of Knox are known as "Old Knox Grammarians" or "Old Boys", and may elect to join the schools alumni association, the Old Knox Grammarian's Association (OKGA).

== Controversies ==
=== Sex offences by teachers ===
The school attracted widespread media coverage in 2009, when criminal charges were laid against five former teachers for alleged sex offences between 1976 and 1990. All five teachers were subsequently convicted.

==== Royal Commission hearings ====
In 2015 the Royal Commission into Institutional Responses to Child Sexual Abuse conducted public hearings concerning the response of Knox Grammar, and the Uniting Church, to complaints and criminal proceedings involving teachers who sexually abused students. The commission will examine the "systems, policies and procedures" involving the school's response to the complaints since 1970 and the experiences of former students sexually abused by teaching staff. The royal commission concluded in 2018.

During hearings in early March 2015, a collection of former Knox students and staff alleged that headmaster Ian Paterson did not refer several allegations of sex abuse he received to the police, despite there being a requirement for such allegations to be reported from 1988. The commission heard that in fact Paterson had never reported any student's allegation of sexual abuse to police during his thirty years in charge of the school. Paterson also stated that he had allowed several teachers accused of sexual abuse to resign and subsequently gave them positive references. Paterson denied that he had covered up the sexual abuse of students, arguing that he had responded to the allegations brought to his attention, and stated that "I should have known and I should have stopped the events that led to the abuse and its tragic consequences for these boys in my care and their families". Paterson stated that he was not aware that it was a crime for a teacher to grope or sexually proposition a student. Following the section of the hearing concerning Paterson, the then headmaster, John Weeks, stated that the school had changed considerably since the end of Paterson's period in the role and that Knox's Paterson Centre for Ethics and Business Studies would be renamed. He also stated that the school was actively reaching out and providing support to those who were affected.

Weeks also gave evidence to the Royal Commission. During this hearing he was questioned over why he had not sacked the teacher who was arrested in 2009 despite having received allegations in 2007 that the teacher had behaved improperly with a student during the 1980s. Weeks told the media that the allegations had not been detailed or specific, and he had received advice that "it would have been difficult on industrial grounds" to have dismissed the teacher. Weeks also stated that he had reported the teacher to the police child protection unit.

The Royal Commission issued its findings on Knox Grammar in September 2016. The Sydney Morning Herald stated that its conclusions were that "Paterson deliberately covered up allegations about child sexual abuse because he placed the reputation of the school ahead of student welfare". The Royal Commission also found that principal Ian Paterson had a "dismissive" attitude towards complaints of sexual abuse, "deliberately withheld information" from a police officer investigating allegations made against Knox Grammar staff and did not notify the school's council or affected parents of complaints. In addition, it judged that a statement made as part of his evidence to the Royal Commission that he had only been aware of a single allegation of misconduct while principal was "clearly incorrect", as he had been aware of five allegations.

The Royal Commission recommended the establishment of a National Redress Scheme, which commenced on 1 July 2018. Knox Grammar School has not signed up to compensate its sexual abuse survivors through the National Redress Scheme, though it indicated it plans to do so.

==== 2019 incident ====
On 5 August 2019, Nicholas Warby, the school's 30-year-old "Director of Aquatic Sports", was arrested for possession of "child abuse material" on his mobile phone. After police searched his belongings and premises, two additional counts of possession of a prohibited drug were added. Headmaster Scott James sent a letter to parents, saying that Warby had been "removed from his duties at the aquatic centre" and that "[the police] have advised us that there is currently no suggestion that the images relate to Knox boys or swim centre students." The police prosecutor told the court that some files were "physically obtained" rather than sourced from the internet. Warby was later convicted and sentenced to 14 months imprisonment.

==== 2024 incident ====
On 30 August 2024, William Gulson, an English, Drama teacher at the school and a former Year 7 Mentor was arrested and charged with one count of procuring or grooming a child under 16 for unlawful sexual activity. On Friday 6 September 2024, Knox's headmaster Scott James sent a letter to parents informing them of the event. Within the letter, it was claimed that "there is no evidence that this behaviour extended beyond the online environment." William Gulson's employment was immediately terminated by Knox Grammar after his acts were made known to the school.

William Gulson has been granted conditional bail under the circumstances that he is not to enter the premises of Knox Grammar, come in contact with anybody under the age of 18 and is banned from using social media apps. During the court hearing, the prosecutor told the court that allegedly upon being told by the child that they were 15, Gulson allegedly replied: "Sorry dude, I feel super conflicted...do you find it hot that you are as old as some of my students?"

The case name for this incident is R v William Roberto Gulson. Gulson is currently appeared at Hornsby Local Court at 9:30am on 25 Sept 2024. Gulson had pled not guilty and was granted bail. He was scheduled to reappear on 18 December 2024.

=== Inappropriate student chat room ===
In September 2022, 150 students (majorly Year 9 Knox students, with some girls and boys from other schools being involved) were discovered to have been participating in a Discord chat room titled 'Gang Gang' in which multiple racist, anti-semitic, misogynistic, and homophobic messages had been sent. It was confirmed that no child abuse material was sent on the server. It was found that the chat was active for about two years, with the school becoming aware of it in August 2022 (in which it was discussed with parents, and where student withdrawals from the chat first began). Material from the group chat was provided to the NSW Police Force, and Knox's principal, Scott James responded to the incident in a letter to parents, labelling the messages by students "unacceptable" and "contrary to the values and culture of Knox". The letter confirmed that students involved were either suspended or left the school, punishment decided on the student's contribution and participation in the chat. Twenty students in the chatroom met Knox's requirements for disciplinary action.

== Gallery ==
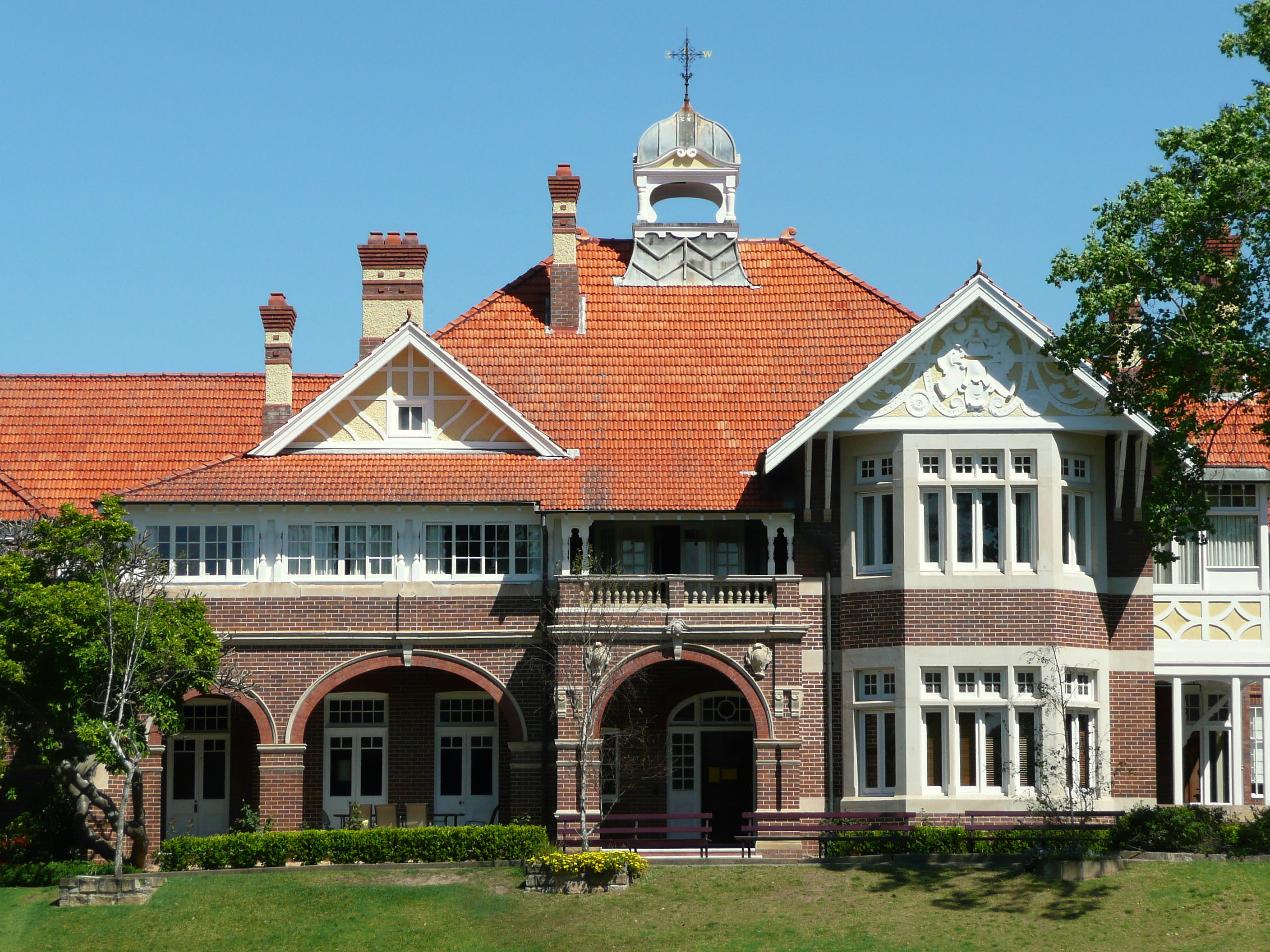
Ewan House

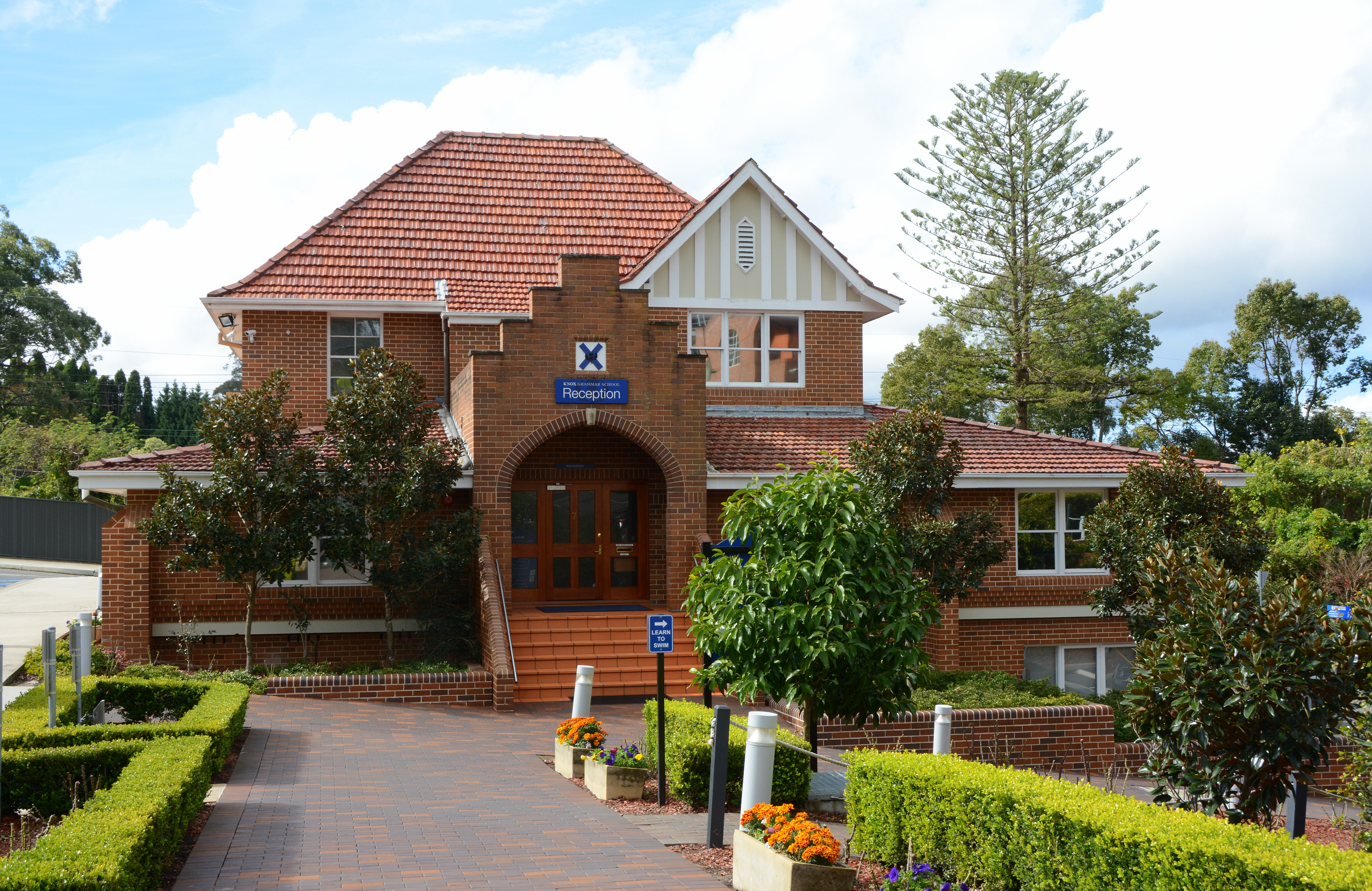
Reception Building

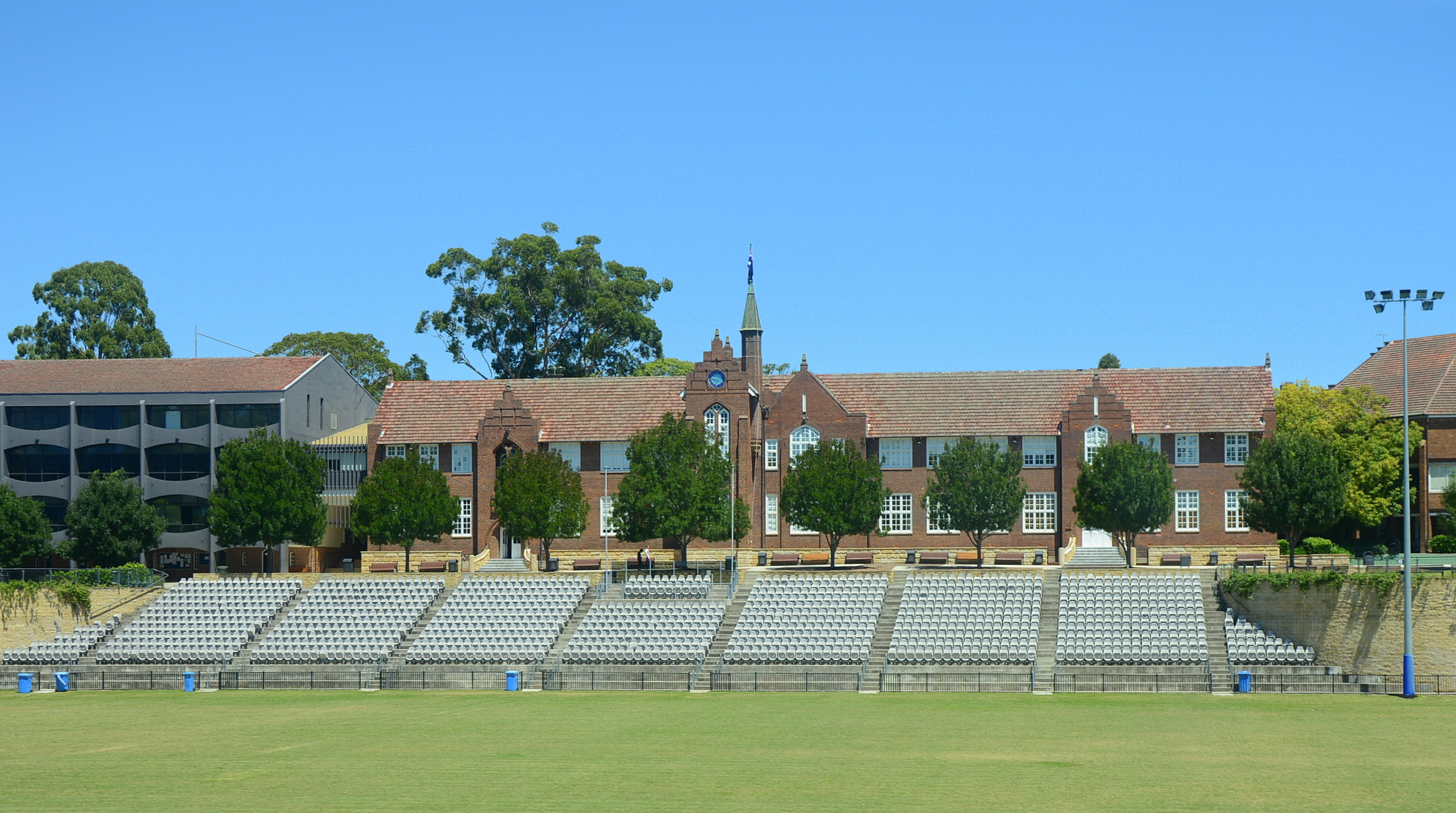
Grand Stand

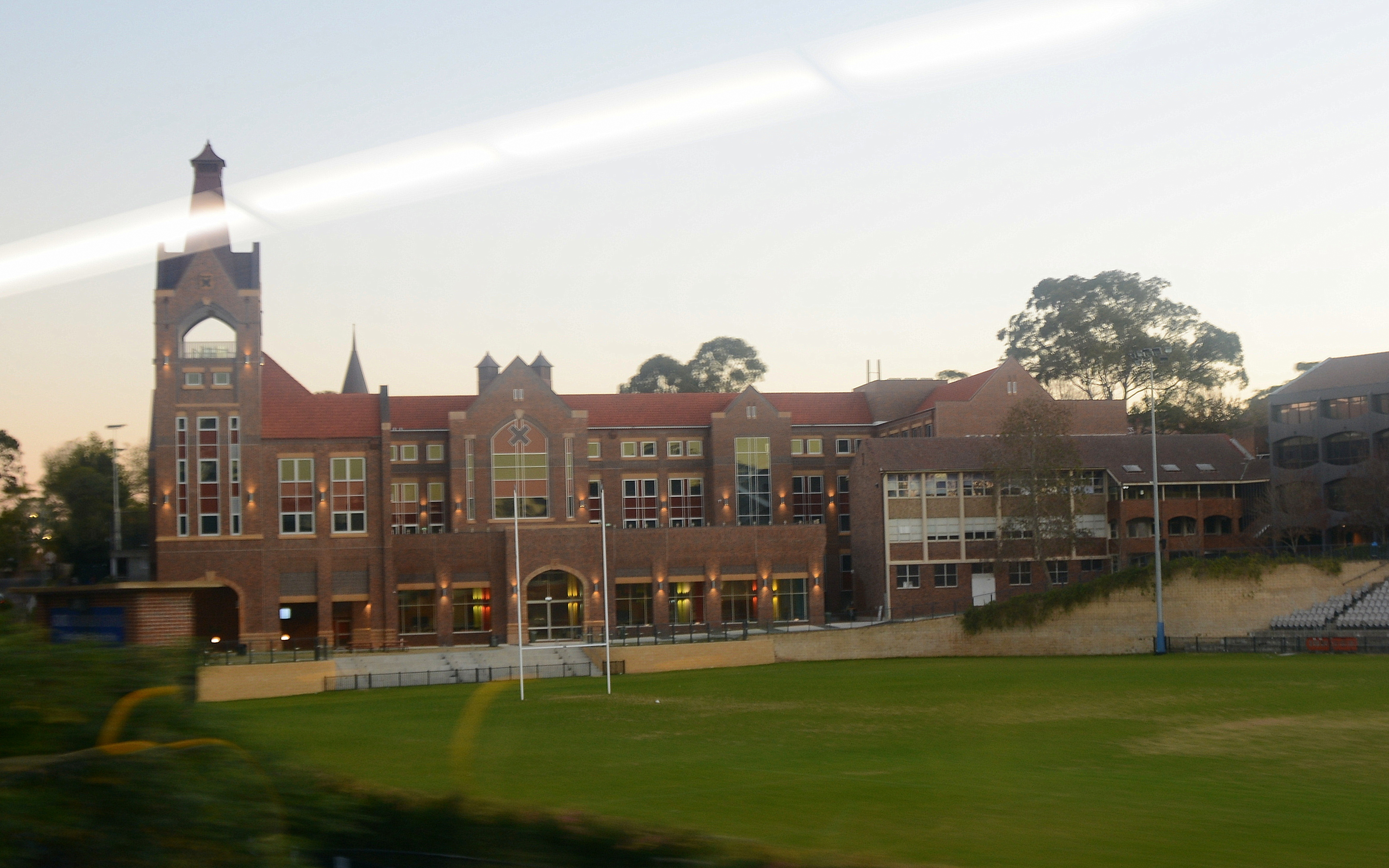
Playing Field

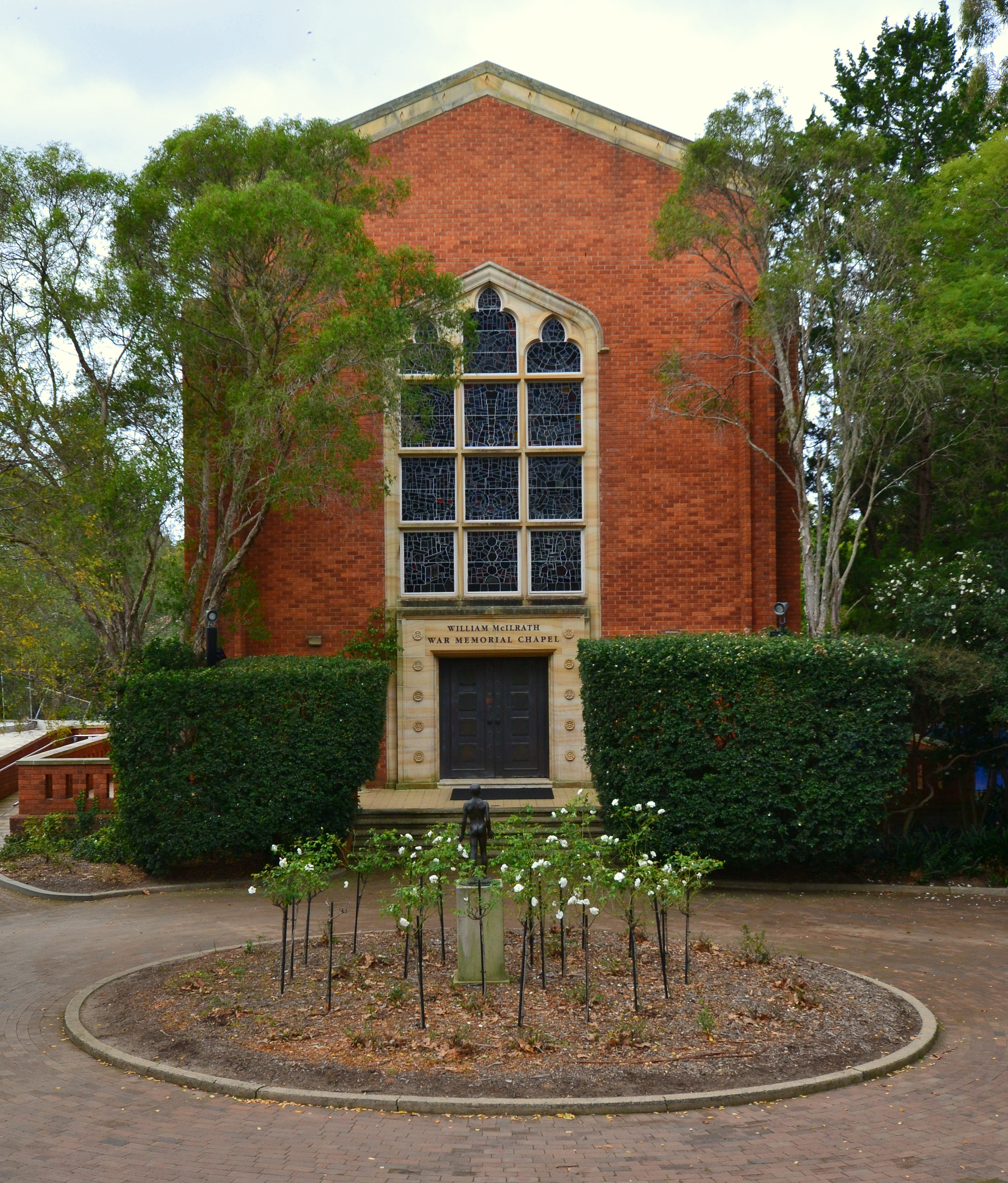
Chapel

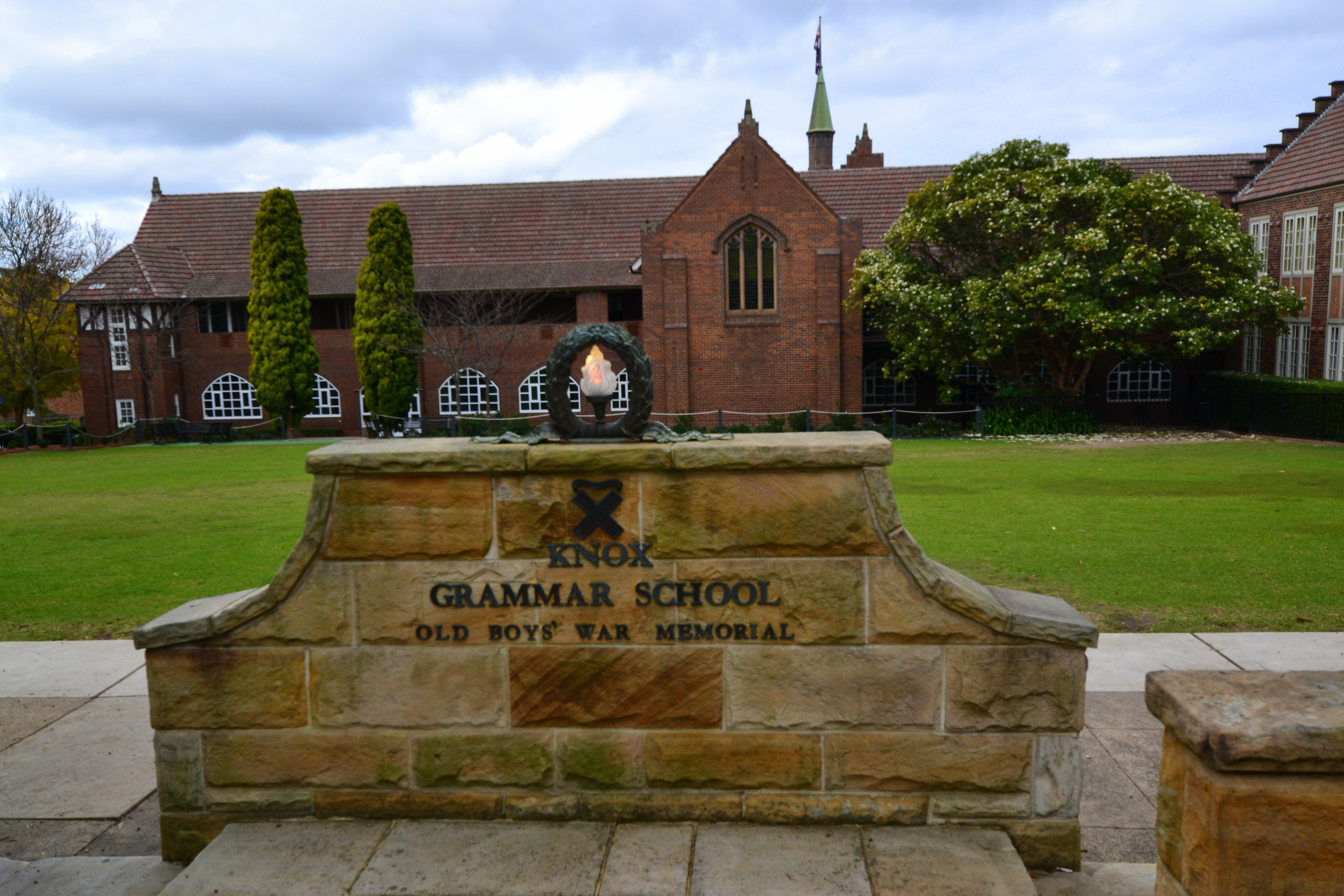
Old Boys War Memorial

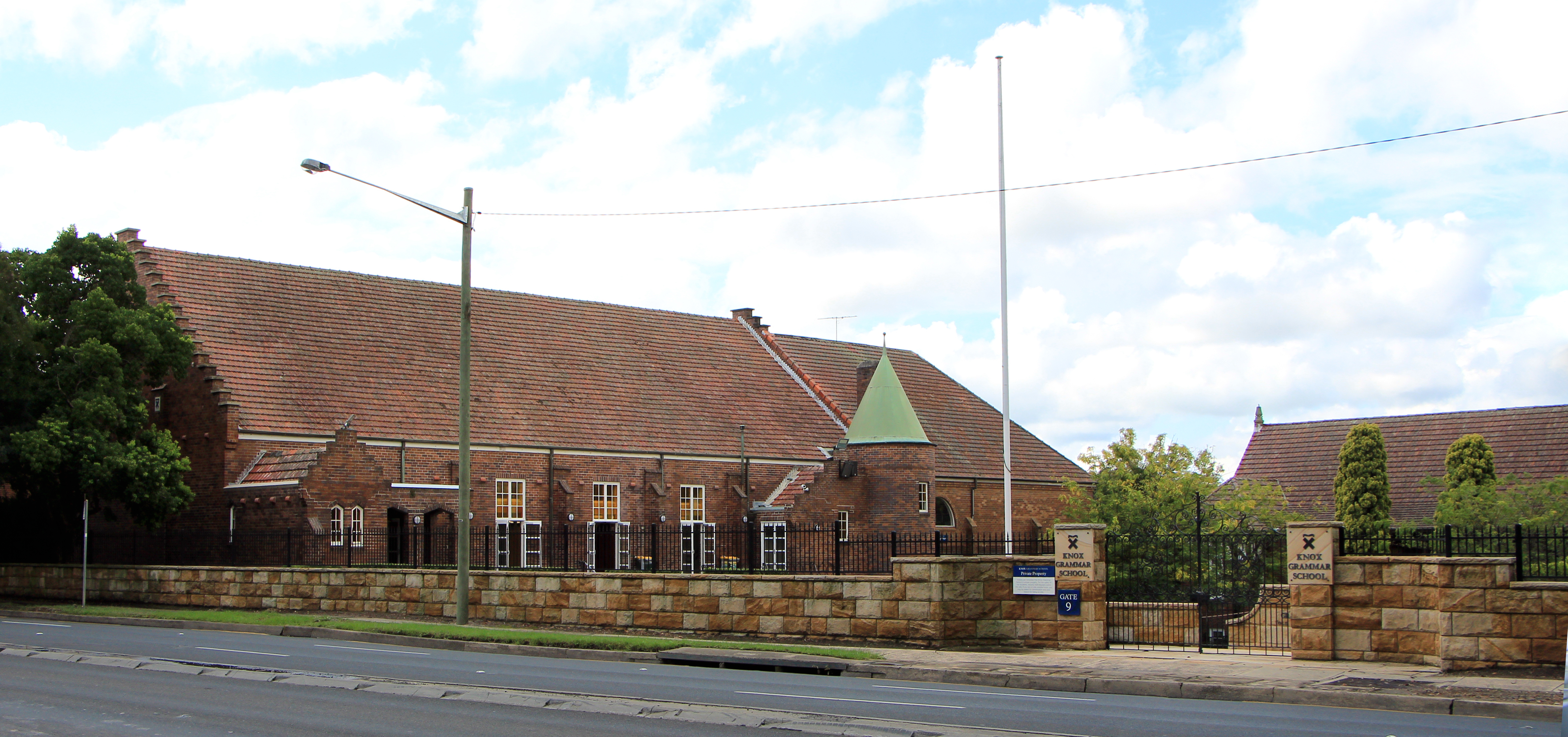
View from Pacific Highway, with the War Memorial Gates in the foreground, the John Williams Memorial Hall on the left, and the Main Building on the right.

== See also ==
- List of non-government schools in New South Wales
- List of boarding schools
- Lawrence Campbell Oratory Competition
- Knox Rugby Club
- St John's Uniting Church, Wahroonga
