= List of Old Knox Grammarians =

This is a list of Old Knox Grammarians, former students of the Uniting Church school, Knox Grammar School in Wahroonga, New South Wales, Australia.

== Academics and medicine ==
- Bruce Carter, educator, former principal of Emanuel School, Sydney
- David Hunter AC, professor of epidemiology and medicine at the University of Oxford
- Vaughan Pratt, professor, MIT 1972–1981, Stanford 1981–2000, emeritus 2000–present
- Michael Spence, academic, 25th vice-chancellor and principal of the University of Sydney 2008–present

== Business ==
- David S. Clarke, Macquarie Bank chairman

== Media, entertainment and the arts ==
- Michael Barkl OAM, composer
- Stuart Beattie, screenwriter
- Ian Cooper, violinist
- Bruce Elder, journalist
- Peter FitzSimons, columnist for the Sydney Morning Herald and Sun Herald, author, former Wallabies player
- Adam Garcia, actor and dancer
- John Howard, film and television actor
- Hugh Jackman, actor; school captain of Knox in 1986
- Richard Lane, radio personality and writer
- John Laws, radio presenter
- Reg Livermore, actor and entertainer
- Peter Mochrie, actor
- Richard Neville, former editor of the satirical Oz magazine
- Jordan Rodrigues, actor
- Mark Scott, vice chancellor of University of Sydney
- Rai Thistlethwayte, singer-songwriter
- Steve Toltz, Man Booker Prize shortlisted author of A Fraction of the Whole
- Hugo Weaving, actor
- Gus Worland, radio and television host
- Peter Yeldham, screenwriter, playwright and author

== Politics, public service and the law ==
- Paul Brereton AM RFD, justice of the NSW Supreme Court and Court of Appeal, Major General
- Hon Andrew Charlton, federal member of parliament for the Division of Parramatta
- Sir John Fuller, former New South Wales MP, Leader of the Opposition 1976–1978
- Hon Sir Kenneth Jacobs, former justice of the High Court of Australia
- Hon Nick Minchin, former federal cabinet minister; leader of Opposition in the Senate
- Brian Preston, chief justice of the New South Wales Land and Environment Court
- Rt Hon Ian Sinclair, former federal cabinet minister and Speaker of the House
- Hon Gough Whitlam, former prime minister of Australia (also attended Mowbray House School, Telopea Park High School and Canberra Grammar School)
- James Roland Wood, former judge

== Sport ==
- Ben Alexander, ACT Brumbies representative and Australian Wallabies rugby player
- Braeden Campbell, AFL player
- Tom Carter, NSW Waratahs representative
- Cameron Clark, Olympian representing Australia national rugby sevens team and NSW Waratahs representative
- Steve Cutler, Australian Wallabies rugby player
- Troy Dargan, NRL player and Cook Islands representative
- Matthew Dunn, Olympic swimmer and gold medallist in Pan Pacific and Commonwealth Games
- Nicholas Frost, ACT Brumbies player
- Chris Green, New South Wales cricket team representative and Sydney Thunder representative and 2015–16 Big Bash League season Grand Final winner
- Alan Gurr, Australian V8 Supercar driver
- Sam Kitchen, Edinburgh Rugby player
- Lachlan Mitchell, London Wasps player
- Matthew Nicholson, state cricketer who played one test for Australia
- Evan Olmstead Canadian international rugby player, representative of Newcastle Falcons, Auckland Rugby and Birritz Olympique
- Luke Parks, AFL footballer
- Rex Pemberton, youngest Australian to climb Mount Everest, at 21
- Max Purcell, Australian tennis player
- Bailey Simonsson, NRL player (also attended Newington College)
- Nic Stirzaker, Melbourne Rebels representative and captain
- Lachlan Swinton, NSW Waratahs player, Australian Wallabies representative
- Bruce Taafe, Australian Wallabies rugby player, NSW Waratah Exec VP Wall St IT corporations
- Ross Turnbull, Australian Wallabies rugby player, coach of NSW and briefly Wallabies head coach; head of ARU board for several years
- Connor Watson, Australian National Rugby League player for the Newcastle Knights, formerly played for the Sydney Roosters
- Simon Whitfield, gold medallist at 2000 Olympics Men's Triathlon held in Sydney

== See also ==
- List of non-government schools in New South Wales
- List of boarding schools
- Combined Associated Schools
