= Ronald Sharp =

Australian organ builder (1929–2021)

Ronald Sharp BEM
- Born: 8 August 1929; Kogarah, Sydney, New South Wales
- Died: 21 July 2021 (aged 91); Sydney, New South Wales
- Occupation: Organ builder
- Notable work: Sydney Opera House Grand Organ; Knox Grammar School organ; Perth Concert Hall organ; St Mary's Cathedral, Sydney organ; St John the Baptist Church, Reid organ; Canberra School of Music organ
- Awards: Silver Jubilee Medal (1977); British Empire Medal (1980)

Ronald William Sharp BEM (8 August 1929 – 21 July 2021) was an Australian organ builder. He was awarded the Silver Jubilee Medal (1977) and the British Empire Medal (1980).

Sharp was born in Kogarah, son of merchant seaman William Sharp and his wife Florence Sharp, née Dumpleton, a dressmaker. His father died sometime around 1936. He was taught to play piano by a grandmother.

Sharp was self-taught and built his first organ in 1960. He specialised in mechanical, tracker action instruments, and was responsible for re-introducing mechanical action to Australia after it had been out of fashion for many years due to the convenience of electrical action. His tracker action baroque organs are particularly famous. Although sometimes criticised as having a unique and characteristic tonal design, rather than an authentic "organ" tone, this tone has come to be much appreciated by some authorities and players.

== Notable organs ==
- Sydney Opera House Grand Organ – believed to be the largest mechanical-action organ in the world. It boasts a grand 5 manuals and 131 speaking stops, 4 stops more than Sydney's other notably large organ, the Sydney Town Hall Grand Organ. It is 16 metres (52 ft) high, 13 metres (43 ft) wide, a total of 8 metres (26 ft) deep and weighs 37.5 tonnes (36.9 long tons; 41.3 short tons). The four largest pipes of the Prinzipal 32' hang on the rear wall and weigh an additional 6 tonnes. Its format, such as the stop and manual names, like most of his other constructions, are German in nature. Sharp was recommended to be the organ builder for this job by the English organist and organ consultant, Peter Hurford. Hurford's admiration for him had been won by the construction of the Knox Grammar School's organ on which Hurford had made a recording. Many people doubted that such a huge pipe organ, as proposed by Sharp, particularly one using mechanical key action, could be built by him – or anybody. Controversy raged throughout the construction years, until finally Sharp’s magnum opus was completed, at a cost of A$1.2 million, under the supervision of the NSW Department of Public Works, which was also responsible for supervising construction of the Sydney Opera House. The Department handed over the completed instrument to the Opera House Trust on 30 May 1979 and the opening recital was on 7 June 1979.
- Knox Grammar School organ – located within the War Memorial Chapel. Well known throughout Australia and the world by its many recordings some of which, as mentioned above, performed by English Organist Peter Hurford. This instrument has the distinction of being the first major modern mechanical action organ in the country. It is a Classical style organ, with 3 manuals, 31 speaking stops, 1 coupler, opened in 1965.
- Ormond College Organ – altered from his design in 1992 and no longer regarded as an authentic Sharp.
- Perth Concert Hall organ – opened in January 1973 along with the Concert Hall however at the time only the front pipes had been installed. It possesses mechanical key action and electric stop action. It contains 3000 pipes of which 66 are visible from the auditorium. It is regarded as his second-largest concert organ after the Sydney Opera House.
- St Mary's Cathedral, Sydney organ – located in the triforium above the chancel intended as a two manual sixteen stop choir organ but never completed. Construction began in 1960 and was discontinued in 1971 with only two pedal stops (16' and 4') and fourteen manual stops installed. The current choir organ was completed by Orgues Létourneau in 1999 and is located in the Western Transept Gallery. It has 3 manuals and 46 speaking stops. Whilst it was made by French organ builders it was designated by the Organist at that time, Peter Kneeshaw, to be an English style organ suitable for accompanying the choir. Whereas the Whitehouse organ in the Southern Gallery was intended to be replaced with a much larger French style organ containing many more speaking stops for the solo recitals. This organ, however, was not installed in the end as the original intent was, due to unforeseeable complications. In spite of this, the choir organ is still quite an impressive instrument in its own right and is quite suitable for teaching lessons and small recitals on top of accompanying the choir. This was his first commission as an organ builder.
- St John the Baptist Church, Reid – a two manual and pedal mechanical action organ. Its case, a joy to behold, is constructed from Western Australian jarrah, and the front burnished pipes are 75% tin. St John's is Canberra's oldest church. In addition to this, this organ was Ronald Sharp's last major instrument.
- Canberra School of Music – a one-manual seven stop portable organ.
