= Troy Dargan =

Cook Islands international rugby league footballer (1997–2023)

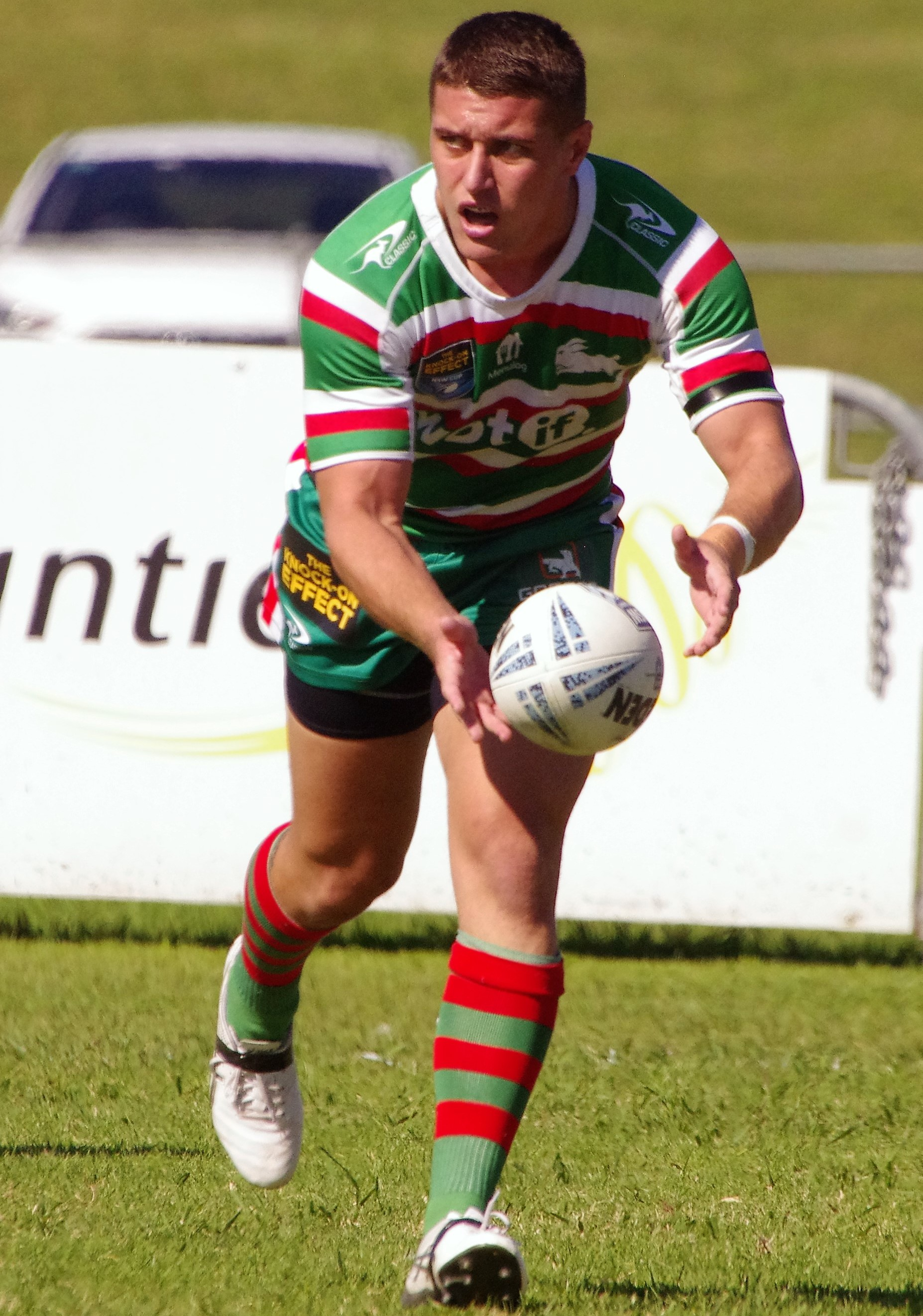
- Dargan in 2021

Personal information
- Full name: Troy Junior Clifton Dargan
- Born: 15 October 1997; Sydney, New South Wales, Australia
- Died: 24 December 2023 (aged 26); Aitutaki, Cook Islands

Playing information
- Height: 174 cm (5 ft 9 in)
- Weight: 87 kg (13 st 10 lb)
- Position: Halfback, five-eighth
Club
Years	Team	Pld	T	G	FG	P
2020	South Sydney	2	0	0	0	0
Representative
Years	Team	Pld	T	G	FG	P
2019	Cook Islands	2	3	0	0	12
- Source: As of 19 March 2021

Troy Junior Clifton Dargan (15 October 1997 – 24 December 2023) was an Australian-born Cook Islands international rugby league footballer who played as a five-eighth or halfback. In 2020, Dargan played two games for the South Sydney Rabbitohs in the National Rugby League (NRL).

== Background ==
Born in Sydney, Dargan was of Cook Islands and Indigenous Australian descent. He was educated at Knox Grammar School in Wahroonga, Sydney, where he represented the 2014 Australian Schoolboys.

Dargan played junior rugby league for Cabramatta Two Blues before signing for the Parramatta Eels.

== Playing career ==
=== 2019 ===
Dargan made his international debut for the Cook Islands against South Africa in a 2021 Rugby League World Cup qualification match. He scored a try in that match as the Cook Islands won 66–6. He also scored two tries in his second match against the United States as the Cook Islands won 38–16.

In August 2019, the South Sydney Rabbitohs announced that Dargan had joined the club on a two-year contract.

=== 2020 ===
Dargan made his debut in round 3 of the 2020 NRL season for South Sydney in their 28–12 loss against the Sydney Roosters following the resumption of the sport due to the COVID-19 pandemic.

=== 2021 ===
Dargan made no appearances for South Sydney in the 2021 NRL season. Dargan's contract was not renewed by South Sydney.

=== 2023 ===
Dargan joined Manly's reserve grade side the Blacktown Workers Sea Eagles ahead of the 2023 NSW Cup season. He played a total of six games for the club. On 11 November, Dargan signed a contract to join Canberra ahead of the 2024 NRL season.

== Death ==
On 24 December 2023, Dargan was killed in a motorcycle accident while holidaying in Aitutaki, Cook Islands. He was 26. Local authorities reported the collision was an "alcohol and speed-related incident."
