= St John's Uniting Church, Wahroonga =

St John's Uniting Church
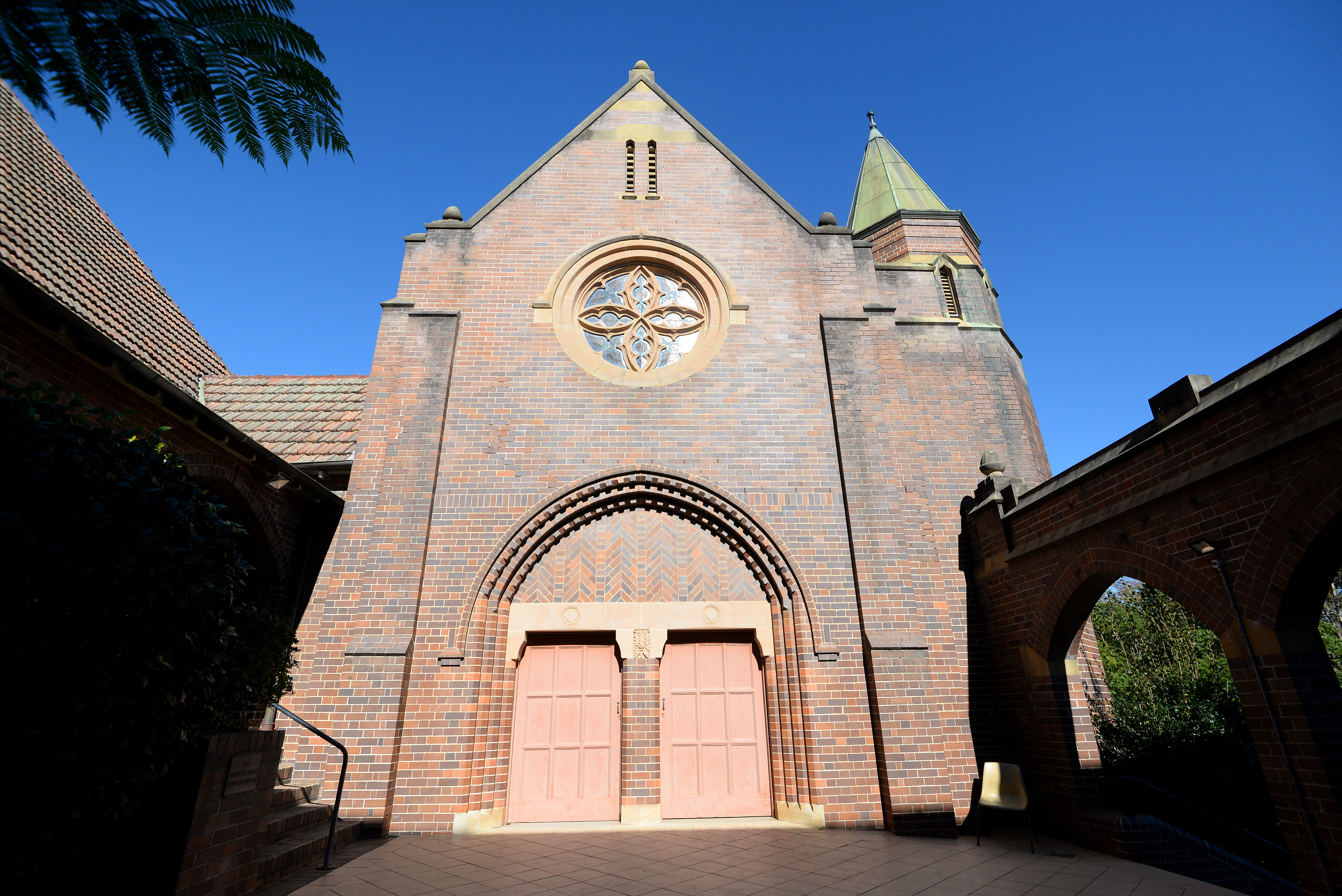
- St John's Uniting Church, Wahroonga
- St John's Uniting Church
- 33°42′55″S 151°07′02″E
- Location: 61–65 Coonanbarra Road, Wahroonga, Ku-ring-gai Council, New South Wales
- Country: Australia
- Denomination: Uniting (since 1977)
- Previous denomination: Presbyterian (1897–1977)
- Website: stjohnswahroonga.uca.org.au

History
- Former names: Wahroonga Presbyterian Church; St John’s Presbyterian Church
- Status: Church
- Founded: November 1897 (first church); 1929 (second church)
- Founders: Rev. J Kemp Bruce (1897); Sir Dudley de Chair (1929)
- Dedication: John the Apostle
- Consecrated: 26 April 1930

Architecture
- Functional status: Active
- Architect(s): John Shedden Adam (of Sulman, Power and Adam)
- Architectural type: Church
- Style: Inter-war Gothic
- Years built: 1929–1930

Specifications
- Materials: Red face brickwork; Red Marseilles tiles

New South Wales Heritage Register
- Official name: St. John's Uniting Church, Hall and Manse; Knox Church; Wahroonga Presbyterian Church; St John’s Presbyterian Church; WPS; Wahroonga Preparatory School
- Type: State heritage (built)
- Designated: 19 September 2003
- Reference no.: 1670
- Type: Church
- Category: Religion

St John's Uniting Church is a heritage-listed Uniting church located at Coonanbarra Road in the Sydney suburb of Wahroonga in the Ku-ring-gai Council local government area of New South Wales, Australia. Established as a Presbyterian church, the building was designed by John Shedden Adam (of Sulman and Power and Adam) and built from 1929 to 1930. It is also known as St. John's Uniting Church, Hall and Manse, Knox Church, Wahroonga Presbyterian Church, St John's Presbyterian Church, WPS and Wahroonga Preparatory School. The property is owned by the Uniting Church in Australia. It was added to the New South Wales State Heritage Register on 19 September 2003.

== History ==
Presbyterian services had been held in Hornsby from 1893 and in 1896 the Rev. James Marshall was appointed to the newly established Hornsby Pymble Parish. There being a number of Presbyterians living in Wahroonga they pressed for the establishment of their own parish rather than the planned Home Mission station.

In November 1897 the Rev. J. Kemp Bruce came to Wahroonga and was inducted as the first Minister in February 1898. He was followed in succession by the Revs. C. E. James (1918–1926), D. J. Flockhart (1927–1956), R. A. Blackwood (1957–1969), A. F. Smart (1971–1995), and R. I. Cirotto (1995–1997).

=== First church building ===
The first church building on the site was an Amusement Hall purchased for A£1,000 in 1898 which was a brick building capable of holding 150 people. It came with an acre of land. It was known as the Wahroonga Presbyterian Hall. A manse was erected in 1899 largely funded by the gift of John Gillespie of 1,000 guineas.

In the 1920s (the exact date is not known) two church halls were built on the site. This allowed the original Amusement Hall to be demolished. The large hall was used for worship while the church was being built.

=== Second church building ===
The foundation stone of the new church was laid by the then Governor of NSW, Sir Dudley de Chair in 1929 and the first service held therein on 26 April 1930.

The architect for this ensemble of church buildings was John Shedden Adam. He was also responsible for the design of a number of local buildings including St James's Anglican Church, Turramurra and the Knox Grammar School main building.

Of the 13 fine stained glass windows in the church, ten are the work of Norman Carter and are mostly memorials to the war dead of both World Wars. The others are by Henry W Hiscox, Bill Mahony and David Saunders.

== Description ==
The group consists of the church and two halls with ancillary rooms, toilets and connecting passages. These are arranged around a central courtyard with arcading forming the fourth side facing the street. The whole is constructed of high quality red face brickwork with darker brick and sandstone trim, under steeply pitched red marseilles patterned tiled roofs. The complex was designed as a whole and was built in stages during the 1920s.

The boundaries to the site are defined by rock face stone walls. Each entrance is marked by stone piers. The main entrance to the church complex retains its original light fitting set in the tops of these piers. The entrance path to the church office/vestry is defined by a steel arch over the path.

=== The church ===
The church is an Inter-war Gothic building with a gable running north–south for the full length of the building. Hipped octagonal transepts project on the eastern and western sides. Entry is from the courtyard at the northern end. An octagonal stair turret, with copper spire, on the north west corner, leads up to the organ gallery above the entry. A square bell tower (minus bells) is located at the south-western corner of the building and dominates the view from the south, the main approach to the complex. Stone string courses and darker brick bands run around the building and stone copings cap the gables. The windows are set in stone tracery with stone heads and sills.

The entry is unusual with a pair of large sliding panelled doors opening the entry porch to the courtyard. A thistle is carved into the stone corbels supporting the lintel over the doors. A large rose window is an important element of this northern elevation. At the southern end of the church an arcaded brick porch links two vestries, which are located either side of the chancel. The church contains a very fine collection of high quality paired lancet stained glass windows, 11 of which are the work of Norman Carter (see images and a detailed description in the book St John's Wahroonga - the first 100 Years 1898-1998 Ed. David Wood).

The interior of the church is face brickwork with a panelled timber dado running around the walls below sill height. The ceiling is timber boarded with exposed rafters and is supported by hammerbeam trusses of an unusual and elaborate design. A deep carved timber cornice, featuring vine leaves, runs around the top of the walls above two rows of corbelled brickwork. The trusses are supported on projecting stone corbels. All the finishes are of a very high quality.

The timber floor slopes from the entry down toward the chancel, which is on raised platform, containing the Pulpit, Lectern and Communion table with chairs for the officers of the Church. All appear to be original. In the east transept are the choir stalls and organ console. The west transept contains a grand piano and fixed seating around the walls with one pew facing into the transept forming a division with the nave. The nave of the church is filled with benched pews (original) arranged with a central and side aisles. The organ is located in a gallery at the northern end of the church. This has been extended c. 1970s and is compatible with the design and finish of the church. The church is lit with large amber glazed lanterns (original), recently modified for halogen lights.

=== Little Hall ===
The Little Hall is a gabled building, also of Inter-war Gothic design. The western wall facing Coonanbarra Road repeats themes from the church building in its detailing. It features stone bands, string courses and copings, together with dark brick bands, plinth and vertical panels, framing the whole. The northern and southern walls are buttressed, and where the arcading that links this building to the church meets the Little Hall, there is a stone capped gabled parapet. Other detailing on these elevations, however, including small paned timber casement windows, the bay window facing the courtyard, and the roof reaching down low over these windows, give the building a much more domestic scale and feel.

Internally the walls are plastered with timber picture rails and dado rails running around them. The ceiling of the hall is timber boarded with exposed rafters and timber trusses with iron bracing. The smaller rooms have flat plaster ceilings. The floor is timber. A tall narrow leadlight window features in the west wall of the hall.

=== Hall ===
The main hall links the church to the little hall on the eastern side of the courtyard by way of an arcaded verandah. The brick arches, with their darker brick headers, reflect those in the arcade on the western side of the courtyard. The hall is two storey in height and has a large hipped roof which sweeps down over the verandah to meet the roof of the Little Hall. Like the adjoining buildings, it also features two tone brickwork and buttresses to its side walls. The windows to the main space are large timber multi-paned double hung windows, while those to the smaller spaces are small paned casements matching those used in the Little Hall. The hall has a second well defined entrance at its northern end leading from the driveway into two offices. These are currently used by the preparatory school located behind the hall.

The hall has a full stage at its southern end. A c. 1950s? stair leads up to a storeroom above the offices at the northern end. The walls are plastered above a face brick dado. The ceiling is timber boarded with exposed rafters and timber roof trusses. Original ceiling vents are spaced between the trusses.

=== Courtyard ===
The courtyard is currently paved with a red pebblecrete and is open to the sky. There is a garden planted in the north-west corner. A grand flight of stairs lead up to the courtyard from Coonanbarra Road. These are flanked by low brick walls and original steel handrails. The church and Little Hall are set only one step above the courtyard level, whereas the main hall with its arcaded verandah is set several steps higher, reflecting the natural topography of the site.

=== Preparatory School ===
The Wahroonga Preparatory School is located to the east of the hall and church.

=== Manse ===
The church site also includes a manse which is a Federation-style, two-storey house built in 1898.

=== Condition ===
As at 30 May 2003, the physical condition was excellent.

=== Modifications and dates ===
- 1920s – two halls constructed
- 1929–1930 – Church constructed
- 1972 – organ loft built at the rear (north) end of the church (architects Laurie & Heath)
- 1994 – lighting upgraded (architect Gordon Fuller)

== Heritage listing ==
As at 24 April 2009, the Church and Hall complex of St John's Uniting Church, Wahroonga, is of State Significance. Designed as a complete complex by the highly regarded architect John Shedden Adam they have retained a high degree of integrity. As a group, and individually, the buildings are of exceptional aesthetic significance. They are well proportioned, refined in detail and the work is well crafted. They are of high social significance for their continuing use as the local Uniting Church and represent the life both of the former Presbyterian church and now the religious life of the Uniting Church community in the area. The place is highly significant in the lives of Presbyterians and members of the Uniting Church in the local area. The site has been a focus for religious and social expression spanning more than 100 years. It has associations with the Gillespie family, of Fielders Gillespie flour mills, who were locally prominent philanthropists and founders of Knox Grammar School.

St John's Uniting Church was listed on the New South Wales State Heritage Register on 19 September 2003 having satisfied the following criteria.

The place is important in demonstrating the course, or pattern, of cultural or natural history in New South Wales.

The church complex reflects the growth and wealth of the Presbyterian church on the Upper North Shore during the first half of the twentieth century.

The place has a strong or special association with a person, or group of persons, of importance of cultural or natural history of New South Wales's history.

The church and halls were designed by the eminent local architect John Shedden Adam of Sulman, Power and Adam. Links with the Gillespie family, of Fielders Gillespie flour mills, who were locally prominent philanthropists and founders of Knox Grammar School.

The place is important in demonstrating aesthetic characteristics and/or a high degree of creative or technical achievement in New South Wales.

The church complex, comprising church, two halls and ancillary facilities, is an excellent example of inter-war Gothic architecture and of exceptional aesthetic significance. The hierarchy of scale and detailing of the three buildings, and their arrangement around a central entrance court, is highly refined and the planning, detailing and workmanship shows a very high level of competency and quality of finish. The complex has undergone very little alteration since its construction, and the work that has been carried out is both sensitive and finely detailed. The church contains all its original fixtures, fittings and furnishings. It also contains an excellent collection of high quality twentieth century stained glass windows.

The place has a strong or special association with a particular community or cultural group in New South Wales for social, cultural or spiritual reasons.

The place is highly significant in the lives of Presbyterians and members of the Uniting Church in the local area. The site has been a focus for religious and social expression spanning more than 100 years.

The place possesses uncommon, rare or endangered aspects of the cultural or natural history of New South Wales.

St John's Church complex is a rare and excellent example of a church complex, including halls and ancillary facilities, being designed and built as a whole, with the scale and detailing of the buildings clearly reflecting the hierarchy of spaces within.

The place is important in demonstrating the principal characteristics of a class of cultural or natural places/environments in New South Wales.

St John's is representative of the growth of the Presbyterian church on the North Shore during the first half of the twentieth century.

== See also ==
- Knox Grammar School
- Presbyterian Church of Australia
- Uniting Church in Australia
