= Sydney Opera House Grand Organ =

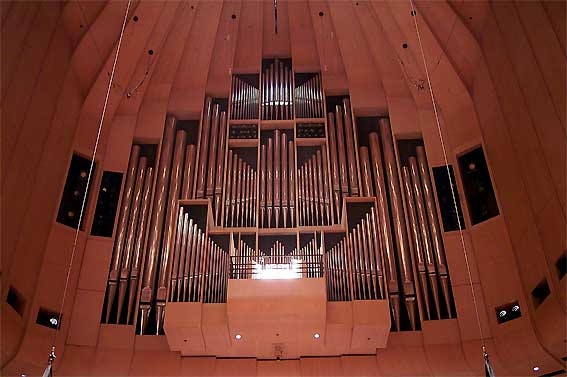
The Grand Organ

The Sydney Opera House Grand Organ is the world's largest mechanical tracker-action pipe organ. It is located in the concert hall of Sydney Opera House in Sydney, Australia, and was designed by Ronald Sharp, who was assisted by Mark Fisher, Myk Fairhurst and Raymond Bridge.

It is in six divisions, five manuals plus pedals, and is the largest tracker action organ ever built, with 131 speaking stops served by 200 ranks of pipes consisting of 10,244 pipes. It is a neo-baroque organ in style.

The contract for the construction of the organ was awarded in 1969, during the construction of the Opera House, and the organ was completed in 1979, six years after the opening of the building. Since then the electronics have been updated, including a major refit in 2002, but the musical specification is unchanged from that developed by Sharp starting in 1967.

In April 1994 the Sydney Opera House Trust awarded the contract for ongoing maintenance of the organ to Mark Fisher, one of the original staff of Ronald Sharp.

In addition to its mechanical action, the organ can be played remotely by an electronic system, enabling it to be played from a remote console, or a performance or passage can be recorded by a system built into the keyboards and played back by the electronic action. This system is used by visiting organists to select the registration (the combination of stops) that they will use, enabling them to stand in different parts of the hall and hear the results. Its stops are entirely electronically operated and programmed.

== Specifications ==
=== Speaking stops ===
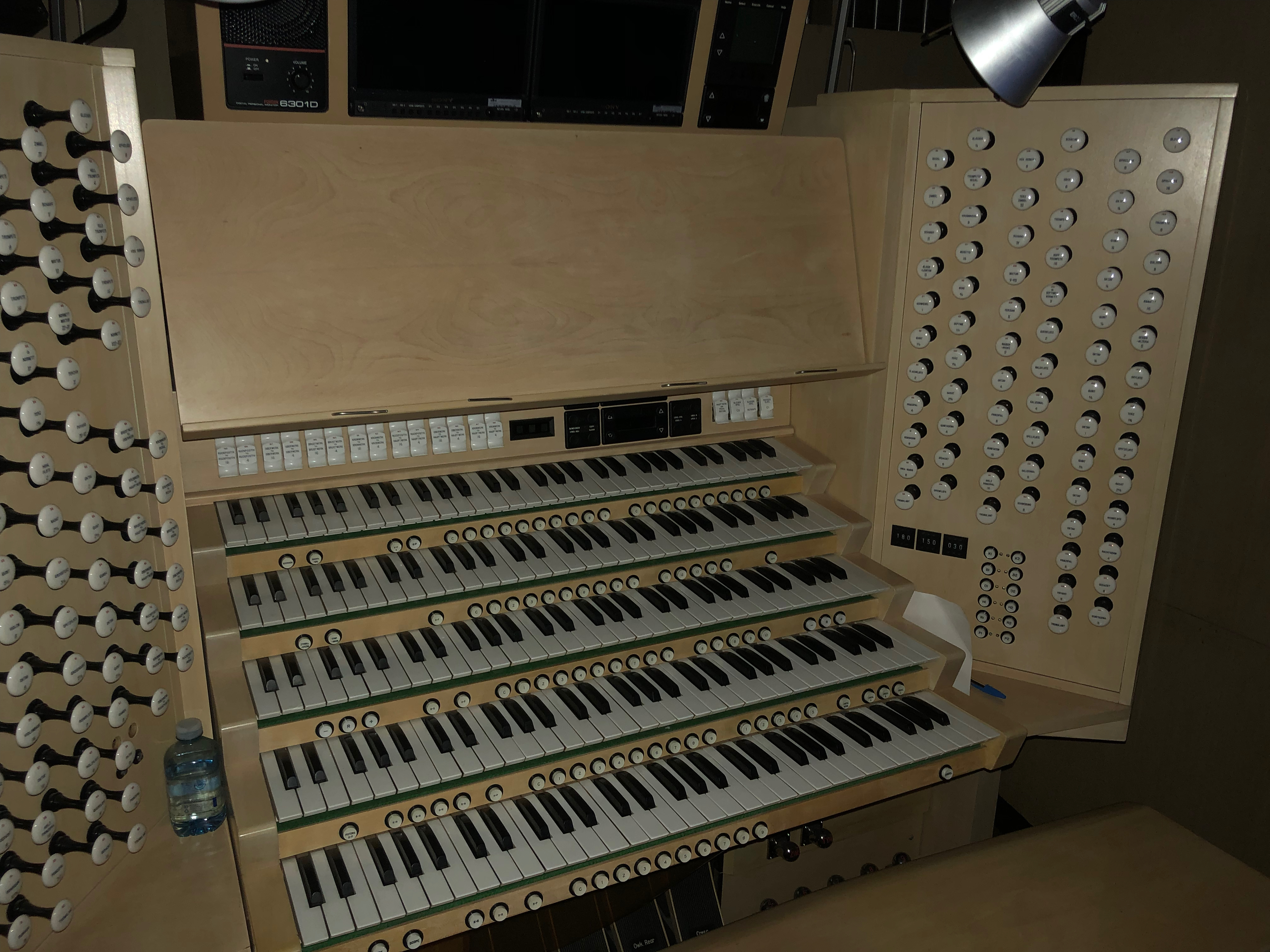
Manuals and drawstops on the console of the Grand Organ.

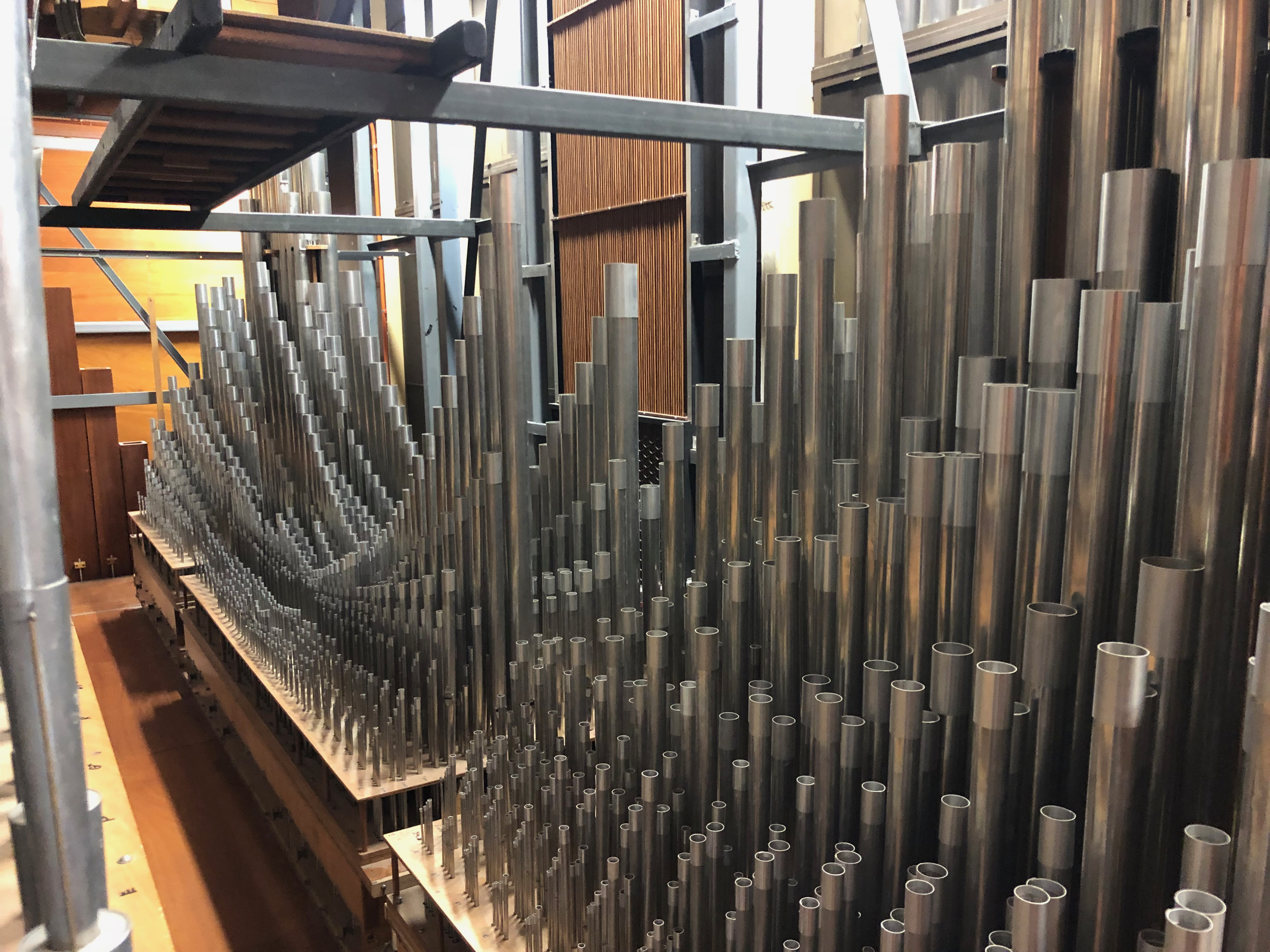
Several ranks of metal pipes inside the Grand Organ.

I - Rückpositiv
Prinzipal	8'
Piffaro	8'
Gedackt	8'
Quintadena	8'
Oktav	4'
Nachthorn	4'
Rohrflöte	4'
Nasat	2.2/3'
Oktav	2'
Spitzflöte	2'
Terz	1.3/5'
Quint	1.1/3'
Sifflöte	1.1/3'
Oktav	1'
Quint	2/3'
Oktav	1/2'
Quint	1/3'
Oktav	1/4'
Quint	1/6'
Oktav	1/8'
Sesquialtera	II
Ophicleide	16'
Rankett	16'
Ophicleide	8'
Trompete	8'
Dulzian	8'
Glocken	1'
Tremulant

II - Hauptwerk
Prinzipal	16'
Gedackt	16'
Oktav	8'
Gamba	8'
Querflöte	8'
Holzflöte	8'
Rohrflöte	8'
Quint	5.1/3'
Grossnasat	5.1/3'
Oktav	4'
Gamba	4'
Spitzflöte	4'
Grossterz	3.1/5'
Quint	2.2/3'
Nasat	2.2/3'
Oktav	2'
Hohlflöte	2'
Terz	1.3/5'
Piffaro	IV-VI
Terzian	II
Kornett Mixtur	VI
Mixtur	VI
Scharff	V
Zimbel	IV
Kornett	VI
Trompete	16'
Trompete	8'
Trompete	4'
Glocken	2'
Tremulant

III - Oberwerk
Holzprinzipal	16'
Quintatön	16'
Prinzipal	8'
Salizional	8'
Schwebung	8'
Spillflöte	8'
Oktav	4'
Salizional	4'
Waldflöte	4'
Querflöte	2'
Rauschpfeife	II
Terzian	II
Mixtur	V-VII
Scharff	IV
Terz Zimbel	III
Septimen Kornett	V
Kopftrompete	16'
Trompete	8'
Oboe	8'
Vox Humana	8'
Schalmei	4'
Tremulant

IV - Brustwerk
Gemshorn	8'
Unda Maris	8'
Offenflöte	8'
Gedackt	8'
Prinzipal	4'
Quintadena	4'
Nasat	2.3/3'
Flachflöte	2'
Terz	1.3/5'
Quint	1.1/3'
Septime	1.1/7'
Schwiegel	1'
None	8/9'
Glöckleinton	II
Scharff	II
Zimbel	I
Musette	16'
Krummhorn	8'
Regal	8'
Trompetenregal	4'
Glocken
Glockenspiel	2/3'
Glockenspiel Reiterate
Kuckuckflöte
Tremulant

V - Kronwerk
Kornett	VIII-XII
Trompete	16'
Feldtrompete	8'
Vox Humana	8'
Helltrompete	4'
Ophicleide	16'
Ophicleide	8'
Glocken	2'
Tremulant

Pedal
Prinzipal	32'
Holzprinzipal	16'
Oktav	16'
Violonbass	16'
Subbass	16'
Rohrquint	10.2/3'
Oktav	8'
Violon	8'
Gedackt	8'
Grossterz	6.2/5'
Quint	5.1/3'
Oktav	4'
Blockflöte	4'
Terz	3.1/5'
Quint	2.2/3'
Septime	2.2/7'
Nachthorn	2'
Bauernflöte	1'
Rauschpfeife	III
Mixtur	V
Scharff	VII
Posaune	32'
Posaune	16'
Fagott	16'
Trompete	8'
Dulzian	8'
Trompete	4'
Singend Kornett	2'
Glocken	2+4'
Tremulant

=== Couplers ===
Drawstop couplers
Coupler	Action
Oberwerk to Rückpositiv	Electric
Rückpositiv to Hauptwerk	Electric
Oberwerk to Hauptwerk	Electric
Brustwerk to Hauptwerk	Electric
Kronwerk to Hauptwerk	Electric
Kronwerk to Rückpositiv	Electric
Brustwerk to Oberwerk	Mechanical
Rückpositiv to Pedal	Mechanical
Hauptwerk to Pedal	Mechanical
Oberwerk to Pedal	Mechanical
Brustwerk to Pedal	Mechanical
Kronwerk to Pedal 4	Electric
Kronwerk to Pedal	Electric

Rocking tablet couplers
Coupler	Action
Rückpositiv to Rückpositiv 16	Electric
Rückpositiv to Rückpositiv 4	Electric
Oberwerk to Oberwerk 16	Electric
Oberwerk to Oberwerk 4	Electric
Brustwerk to Brustwerk 16	Electric
Brustwerk to Brustwerk 4	Electric
Kronwerk to Kronwerk 16	Electric
Kronwerk to Kronwerk 4	Electric
Rückpositiv to Hauptwerk 16	Electric
Rückpositiv to Hauptwerk 4	Electric
Oberwerk to Hauptwerk 16	Electric
Oberwerk to Hauptwerk 4	Electric
Kronwerk to Hauptwerk 16	Electric
Kronwerk to Hauptwerk 4	Electric
Hauptwerk and Pedal Pistons	Electric

== Gallery ==
Additional pictures of the organ and its components.

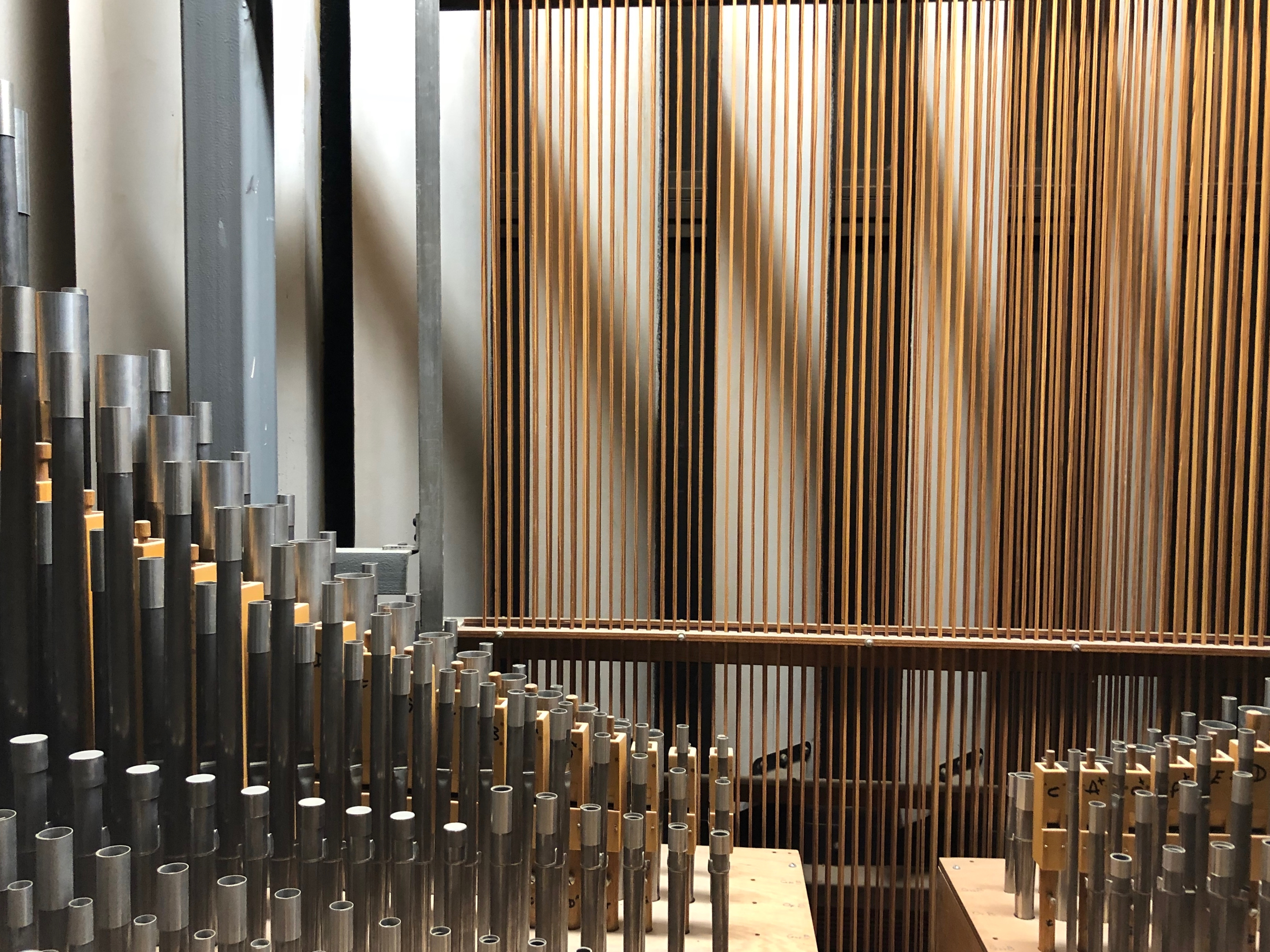
Ranks of metal pipes with wooden tracker-action struts visible. In the background are louvres of the oberwerk enclosed division.

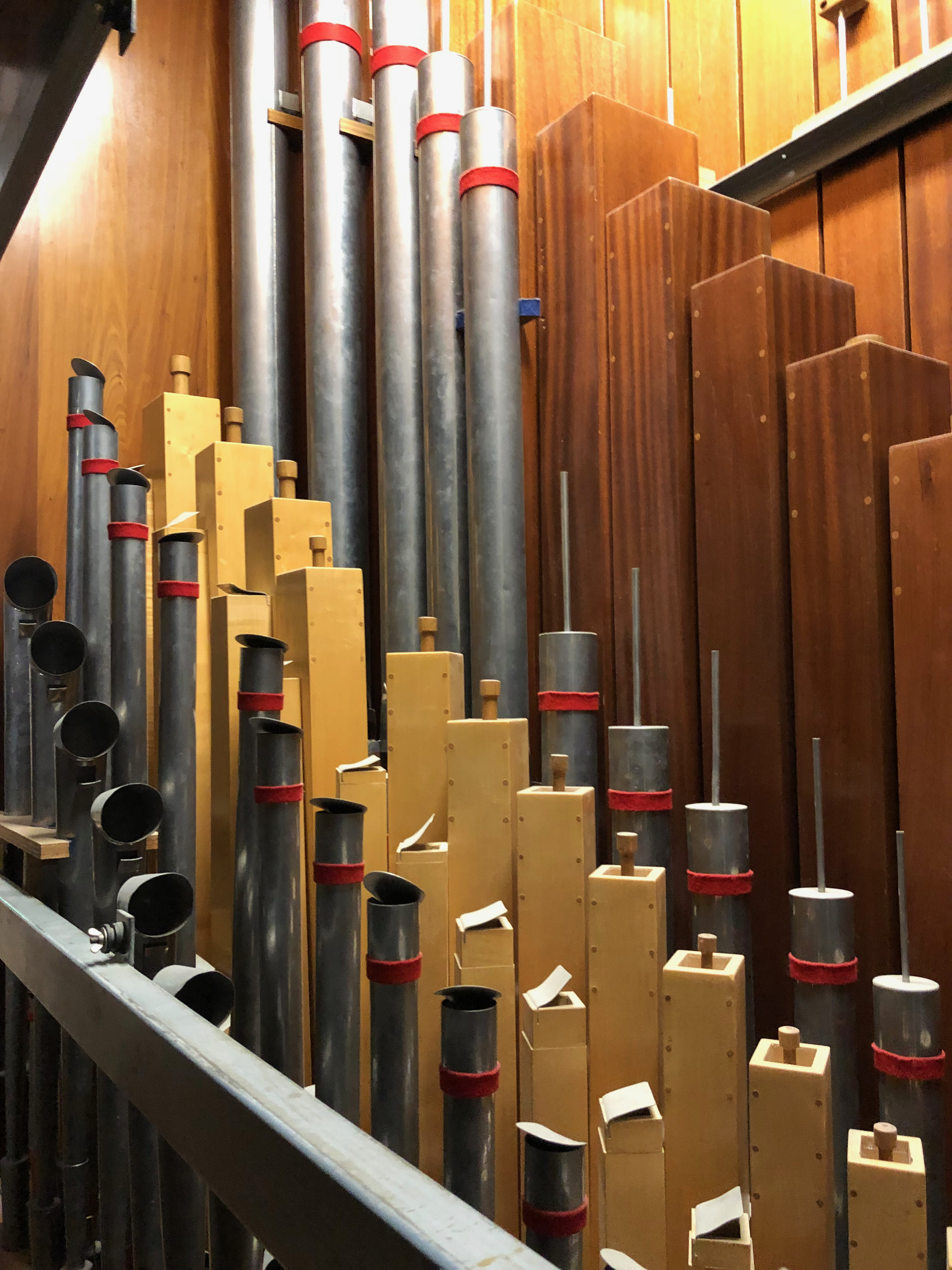
Six ranks of pipes, all different voice types.
