= Perth Concert Hall (Western Australia) =

Concert hall in Perth, Western Australia

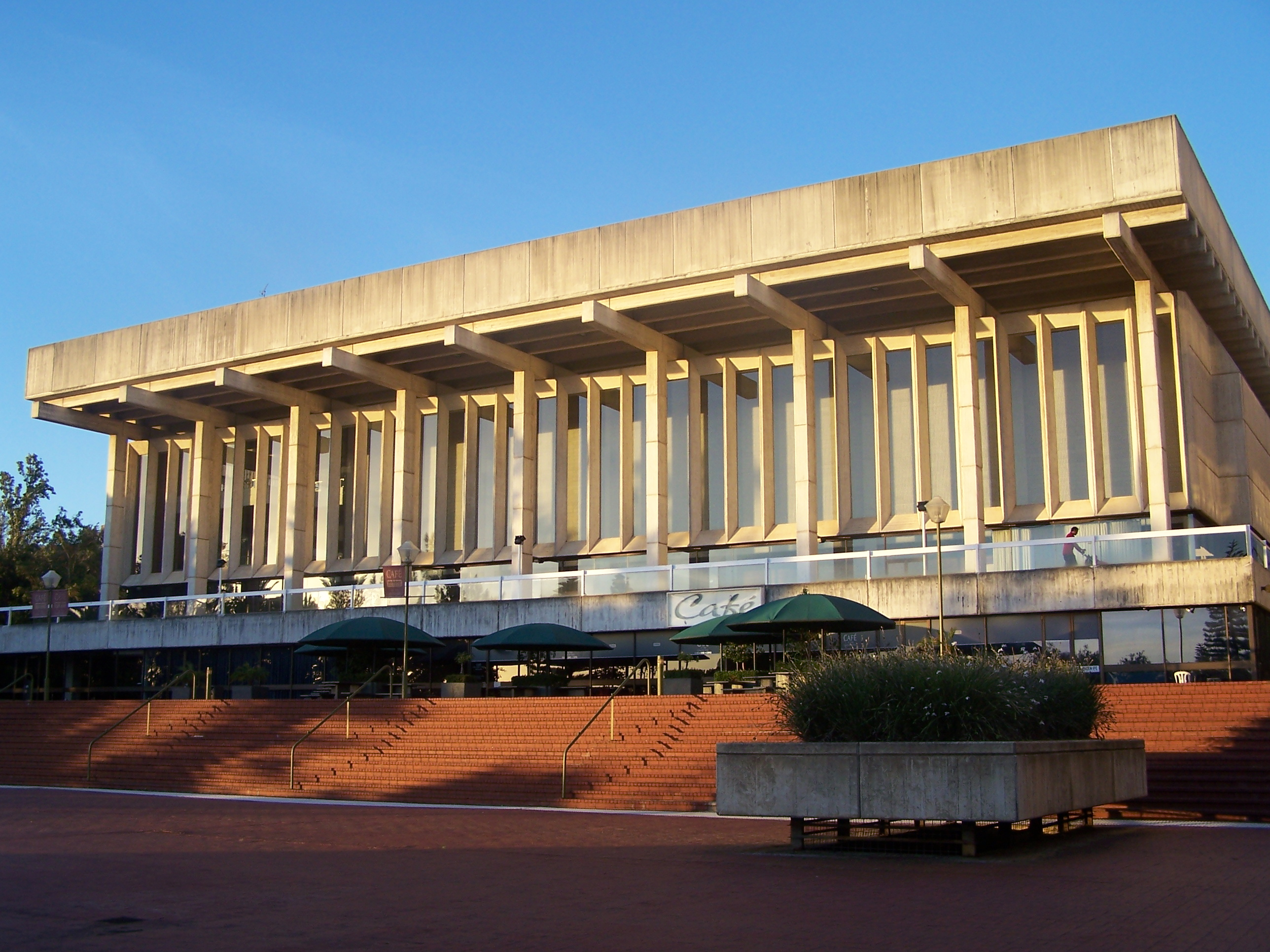

General information
- Status: Closed for renovation
- Type: Concert hall
- Architectural style: Brutalist
- Location: 5 St George's Terrace, Perth WA 6000, Perth, Western Australia, Australia
- Coordinates: 31°57′29″S 115°51′50″E
- Current tenants: West Australian Symphony Orchestra; Various other events and performances
- Construction started: 1971; 55 years ago
- Opened: 26 January 1973
- Cost: A$3.2M
- Owner: City of Perth

Design and construction
- Architecture firm: Howlett & Bailey
- Main contractor: Transfield

Other information
- Seating capacity: 1,729 people (main auditorium)

Western Australia Heritage Register
- Type: State Registered Place
- Designated: 12 July 2002
- Reference no.: 4571

The Perth Concert Hall is a concert hall located in Perth, Western Australia. Owned by the City of Perth, the concert hall is the main venue of the West Australian Symphony Orchestra, and also hosts a number of other events and performances. The building itself is located in the Perth central business district, adjacent to the Supreme Court Gardens and Government House. It has two façades: facing north over St Georges Terrace, and facing south over the Swan River.

The concert hall was constructed on land granted to the City of Perth by the Government of Western Australia, and opened on Australia Day (26 January), 1973. Designed by Howlett & Bailey, the building is constructed in the Brutalist style, making heavy use of white off-form concrete and a solid opaque interior. The main auditorium of the hall seats 1,729 people, as well as a 160-person choir gallery and a 3,000 pipe organ. Acoustically, the venue is considered one of the best in Australia, with the design overseen by the New Zealand acoustician Harold Marshall.

The venue closed for renovations in 2024.

== History ==
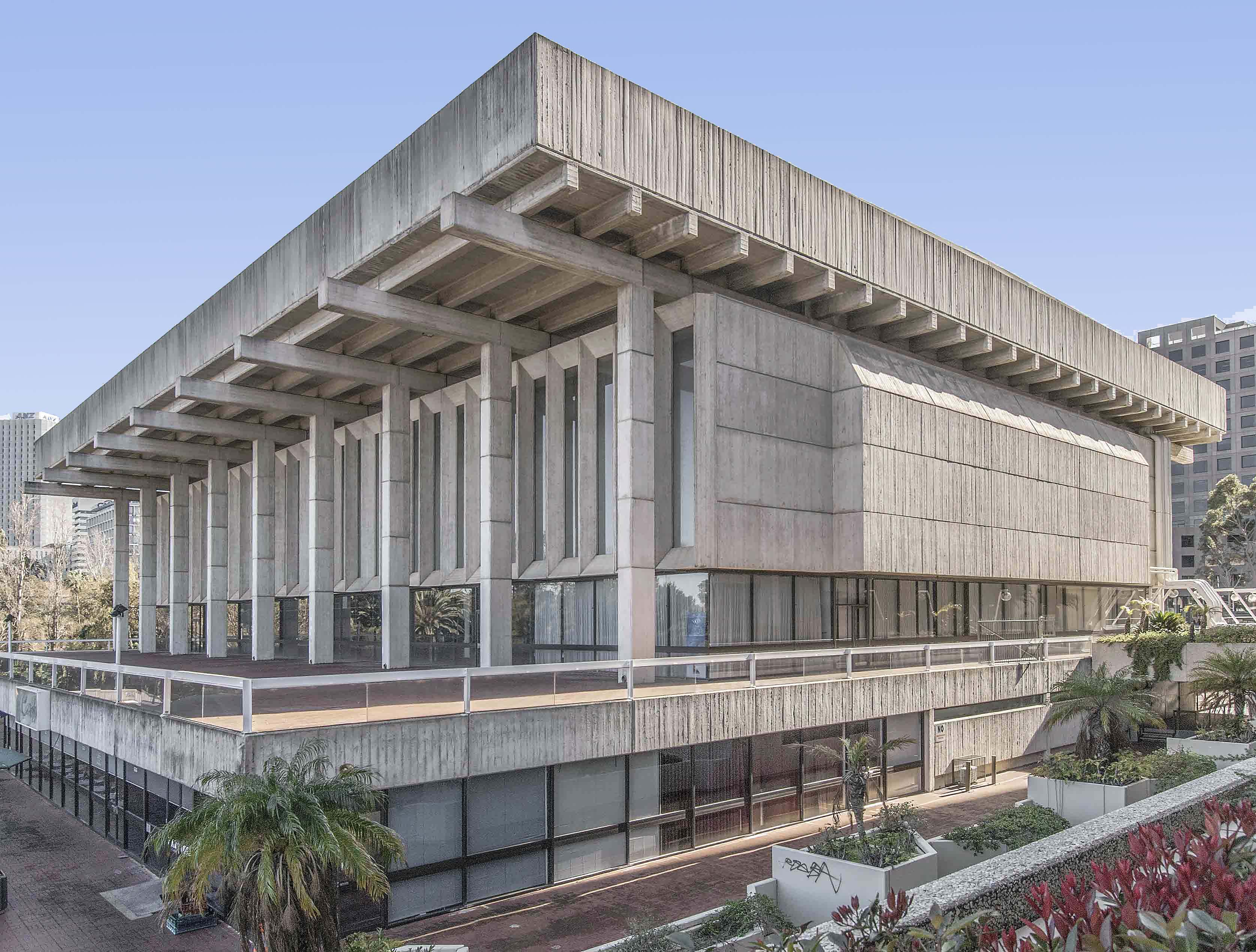
Perth Concert Hall southeast corner

In 1950, the Government of Western Australia granted the City of Perth land between Stirling Gardens and Government House. Howlett & Bailey designed an administrative building and an auditorium, however due to financial constraints, only the former was built, Council House opening in 1963. In 1968 Howlett & Bailey was appointed to design a concert hall with construction by Transfield commencing in 1971. It was officially opened on 26 January 1973 by the Governor General Paul Hasluck, with Prime Minister Gough Whitlam also in attendance.

In January 2015 the West Australian Symphony Orchestra become the venue manager of the hall, taking over from AEG Ogden that had managed it since March 1999. In April 2018, the City of Perth approved a A$1.4-million upgrade for the concert hall.

A A$52-million, equivalent to A$57 million in 2022, redevelopment of the concert hall was announced in 2020 as part of the Perth City Deal project, with the Government of Western Australia contributing A$36.4 million, the federal government A$12 million and the City of Perth A$4 million. In March 2022, With Architecture Studio and Office for Metropolitan Architecture (OMA) were appointed lead architects for the redevelopment. In March 2023, the state government announced an additional A$98 million towards the project, bringing the total funding to A$150 million. The redevelopment commenced with closure of the venue in 2025 and is scheduled for completion in early 2028.

== Architectural design ==
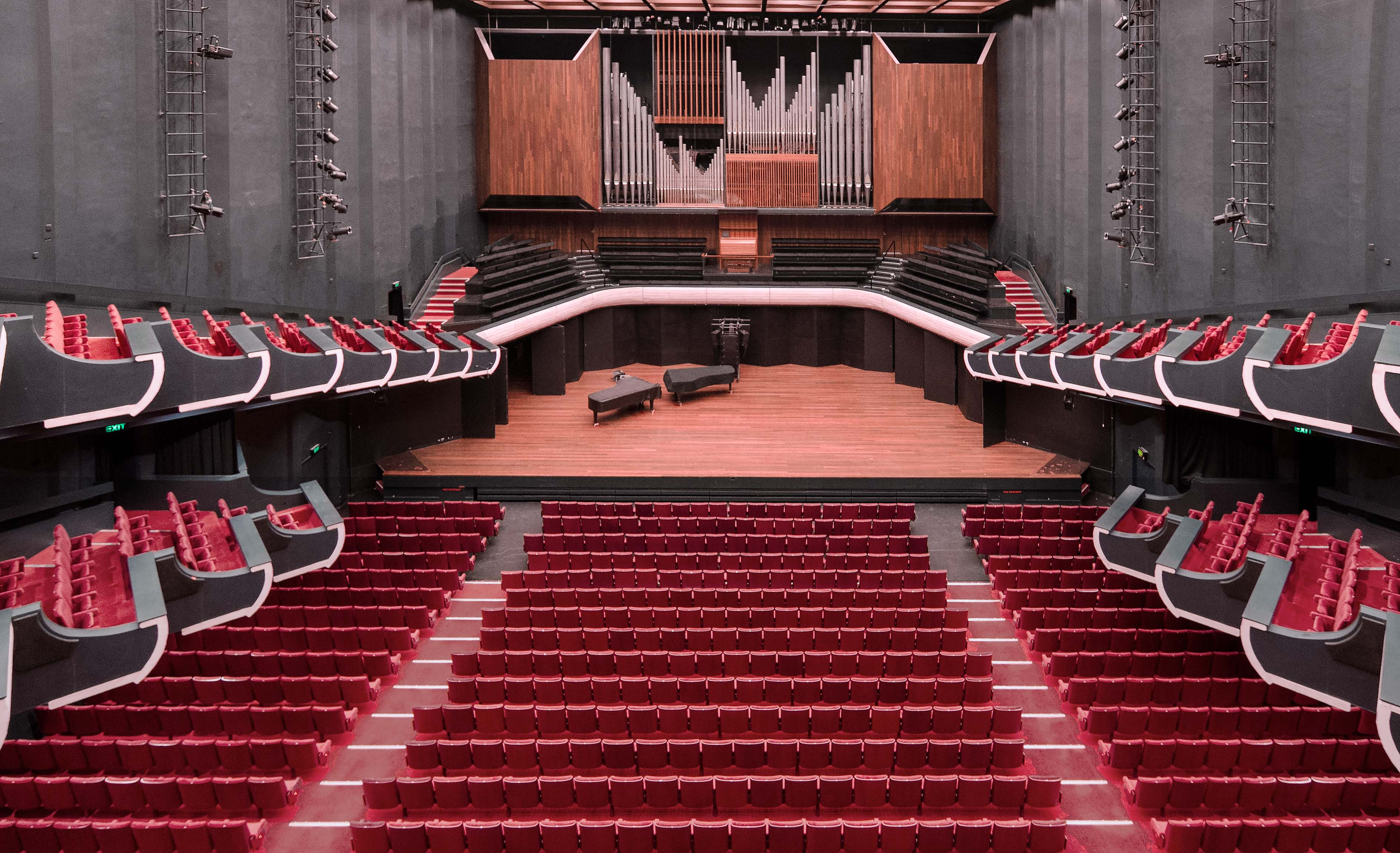
View of the auditorium from back stalls towards the stage and organ

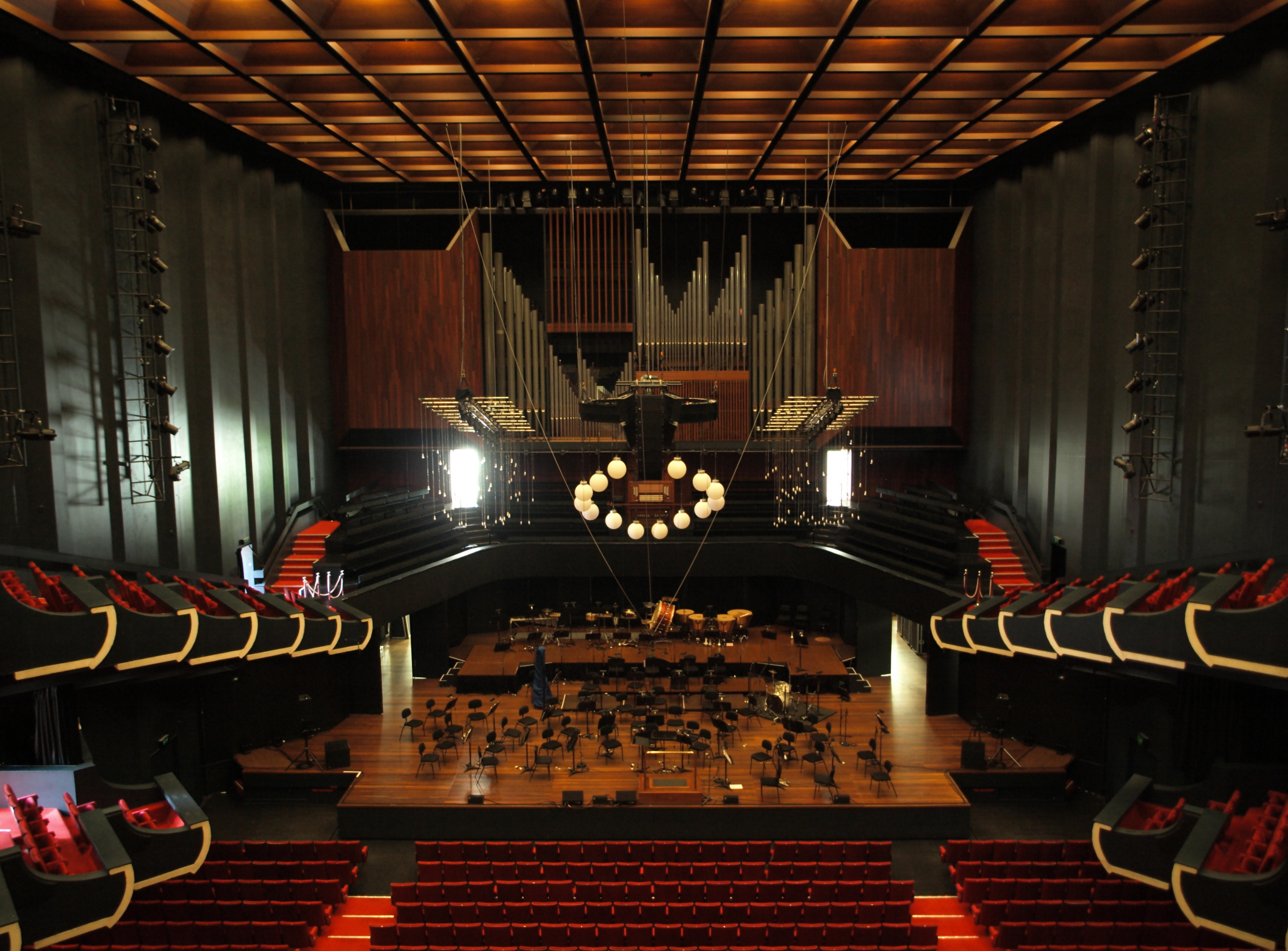
Interior detail of the Perth Concert Hall, showing the stage and pipe organ

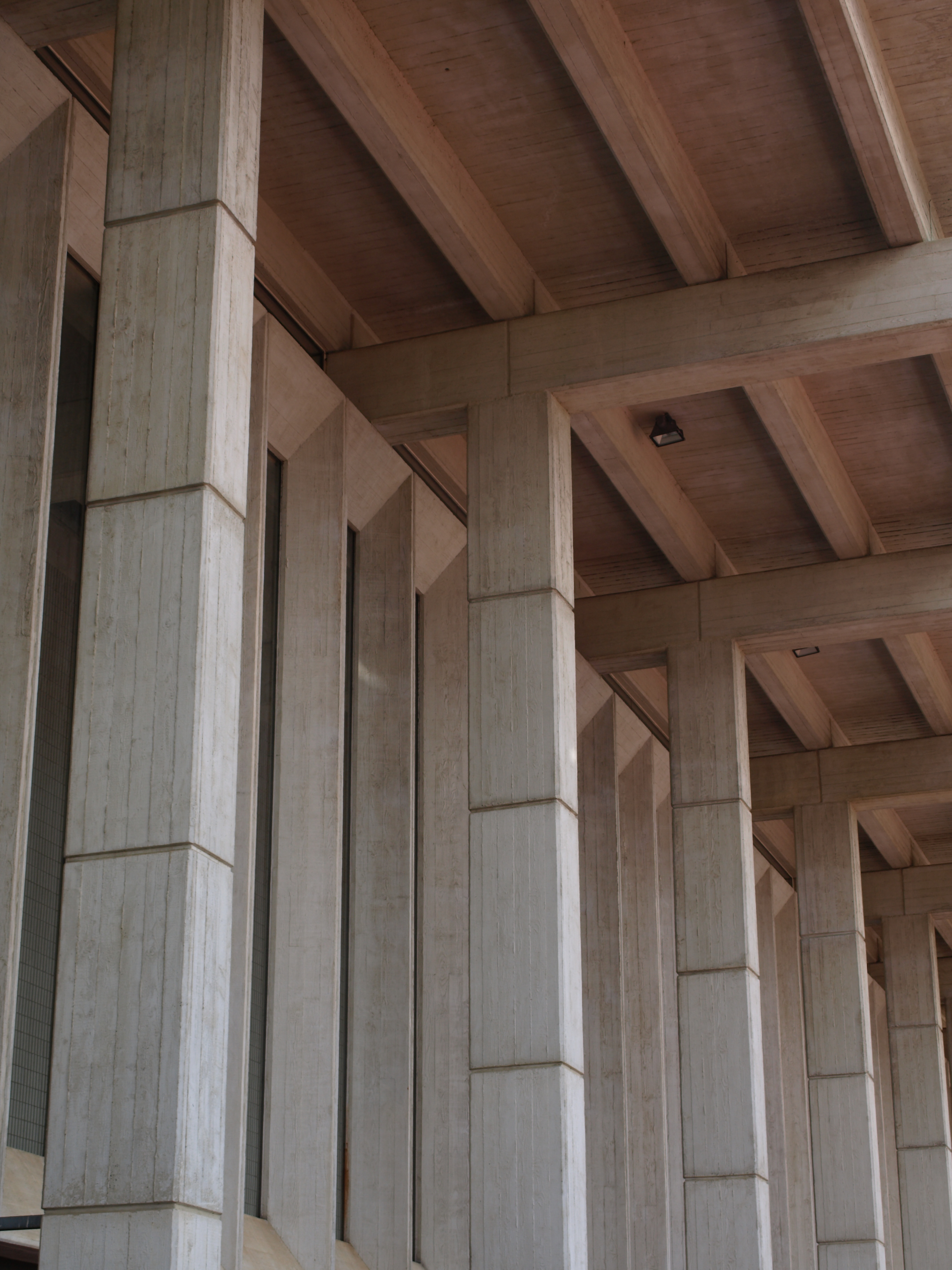
The concert hall displays elements of brutalist architecture

The building was designed by Howlett & Bailey. Jeffrey Howlett and Donald Bailey had won a design competition for a town hall and auditorium in 1961. Their design consisted of two buildings, one containing administrative offices and the other, oval in shape, comprising the "town hall" or auditorium. The administration offices, called Council House, were built, however financial constraints and doubts regarding the auditorium's acoustic properties meant that construction of the auditorium building was delayed. Its design was subsequently re-considered and it was not until the late-1960s that a different plan was approved.

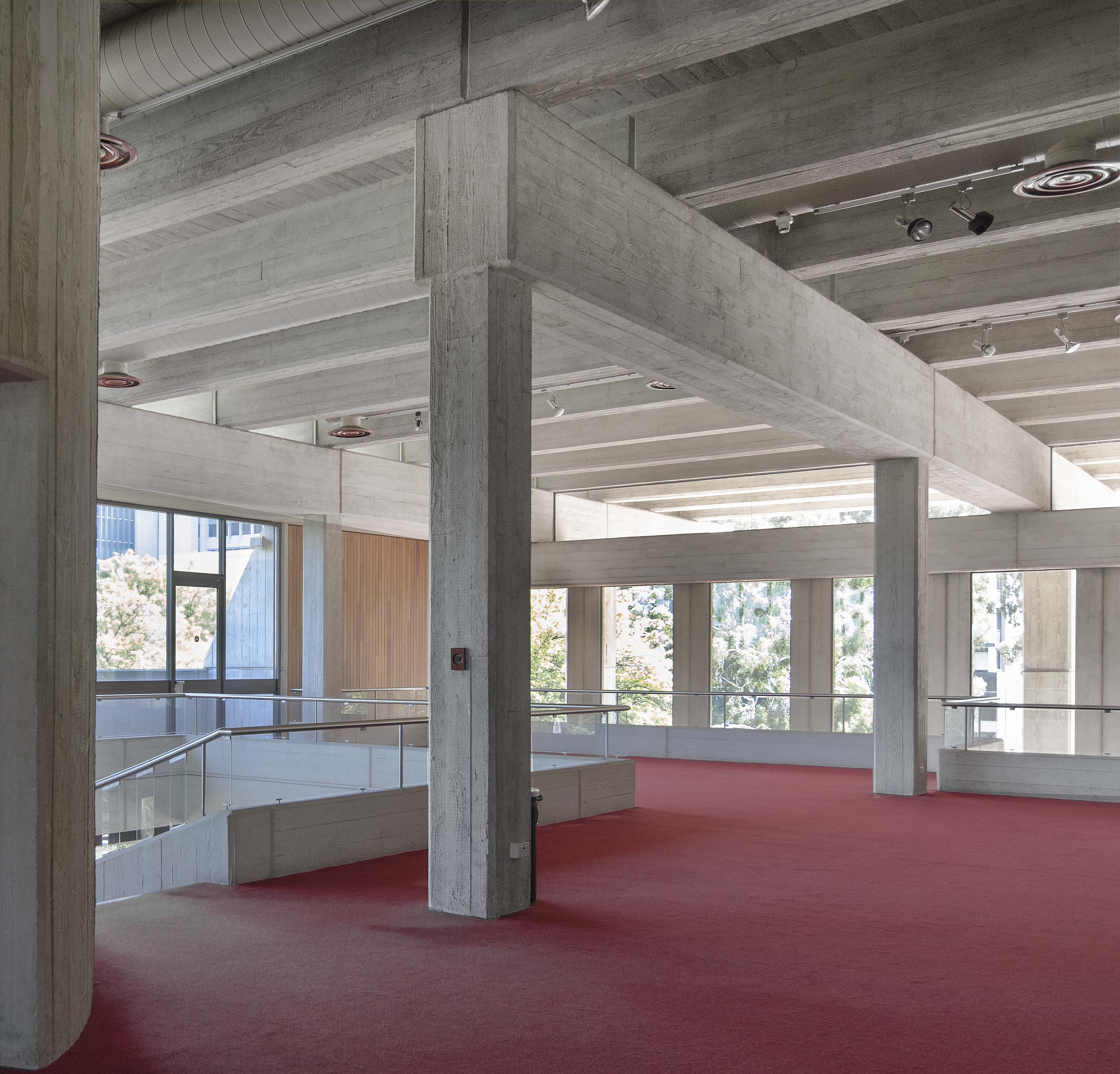
Gallery level foyer showing post and lintel

Through 1969, the architectural plans were amended several times. These amendments included beautification and landscaping of the main pedestrian approach from St Georges Terrace and construction of a subway under the Terrace, a pit for a 60-piece orchestra with removable flooring and seating to cover the pit when not in use, and improved access and facilities for disabled people. The original plans included a restaurant with a seating capacity for 400, but following inspection of similar halls in the eastern states of Australia, it was decided that this was not warranted. It was, therefore, decided to make the restaurant smaller and include a tavern and cocktail bar, allowing patrons a wider choice. The bar area was named Wardle Room, after Thomas Wardle.

It was the architects' intention that the exhibition foyers would be used as a continually changing venue for all types of art (such as painting, tapestry and sculpture exhibitions) rather than as permanent exhibition spaces. This may have influenced the Perth City Council's indecision over whether or not to accept artist Sidney Nolan's offer to permanently loan the city a series of 64 paintings of wildflowers for hanging in the hall. After considerable public debate over the matter, Nolan withdrew the offer and art dealers and others criticised the short sighted and parochial attitude of the council in refusing the offer. Ironically, the first exhibition in the foyers featured 54 of Nolan's wildflower paintings.

Several consultants were involved in the design of the building, including acoustic consultants, structural engineers, and experts in escalators, stage machinery and lighting. D. H. Fraser was responsible for the structural design and Marshall was the acoustics consultant, in association with Warwick Mehaffey of the Australian Broadcasting Corporation.

The Perth Concert Hall is an example of brutalist architecture, with its solid opaque interior, giant projecting roof, and use of white off-form concrete. It forms a counterpoint to the transparent filigree of Council House.

The auditorium features a specially commissioned 3,000 pipe organ surrounded by a 160-person choir gallery and an audience seating capacity of 1,729. The organ, individually designed, cost $100,000 and was commissioned by Ronald Sharp of Sydney, who was also responsible for the organ at the Sydney Opera House. The larger pipes for the organ were imported from the Netherlands. Bailey recollects that Sharp was an "extraordinarily talented person, largely self-educated, who has to his credit the design and construction of a number of organs, mostly in New South Wales." A 2.7-metre (9 ft) Steinway orchestral concert grand piano (Model D) was also imported from West Germany for installation in the Hall.

The concert call was the first in Australia to have a show relay installed so that latecomers could watch on two screens in the foyer while waiting for an appropriate time to enter. Another screen is located at the stage door.

The City of Perth and the Government of Western Australia, as well as the architects and builders, received many compliments on the hall as it neared completion from visiting experts in the fields of music, architecture and construction.

== Operations ==
The Perth Concert Hall has been described as one of the best fine music acoustics venues in Australia. It has played host to a diverse selection of internationally acclaimed performers including the London Philharmonic, Chicago Symphony, Israel Philharmonic and contemporary performers B.B. King, Sting, k.d. lang, Harry Connick Jr., Melissa Etheridge, Ray Charles, Rowan Atkinson and Billy Connolly.

The majority of concerts by the West Australian Symphony Orchestra are performed at the Perth Concert Hall. The venue is also used for their rehearsals.

The venue is also used to host national conventions and exhibitions, award ceremonies and gala dinners. Recent exhibitions include the Steinway piano exhibition in March 2008. In addition, the venue is used for private or corporate functions in areas other than the auditorium, for example in the foyers, bar and café.

== Association with Perth Concert Hall, Scotland ==
On 27 September 2006 the Perth Concert Hall participated in a twinning ceremony and the signing of Mutual Understanding with the Perth Concert Hall, Scotland. As a result of this twinning the Concert Hall now flies the St Andrews Flag at the front of the venue to commemorate the twinning.

== Enduring Architecture Awards ==
In 2016 the cultural significance of the building was acknowledged by the Australian Institute of Architects, initially winning the state based Richard Roach Jewell Award for Enduring Architecture, later in the same year was also presented the National Award for Enduring Architecture.

== Gallery ==
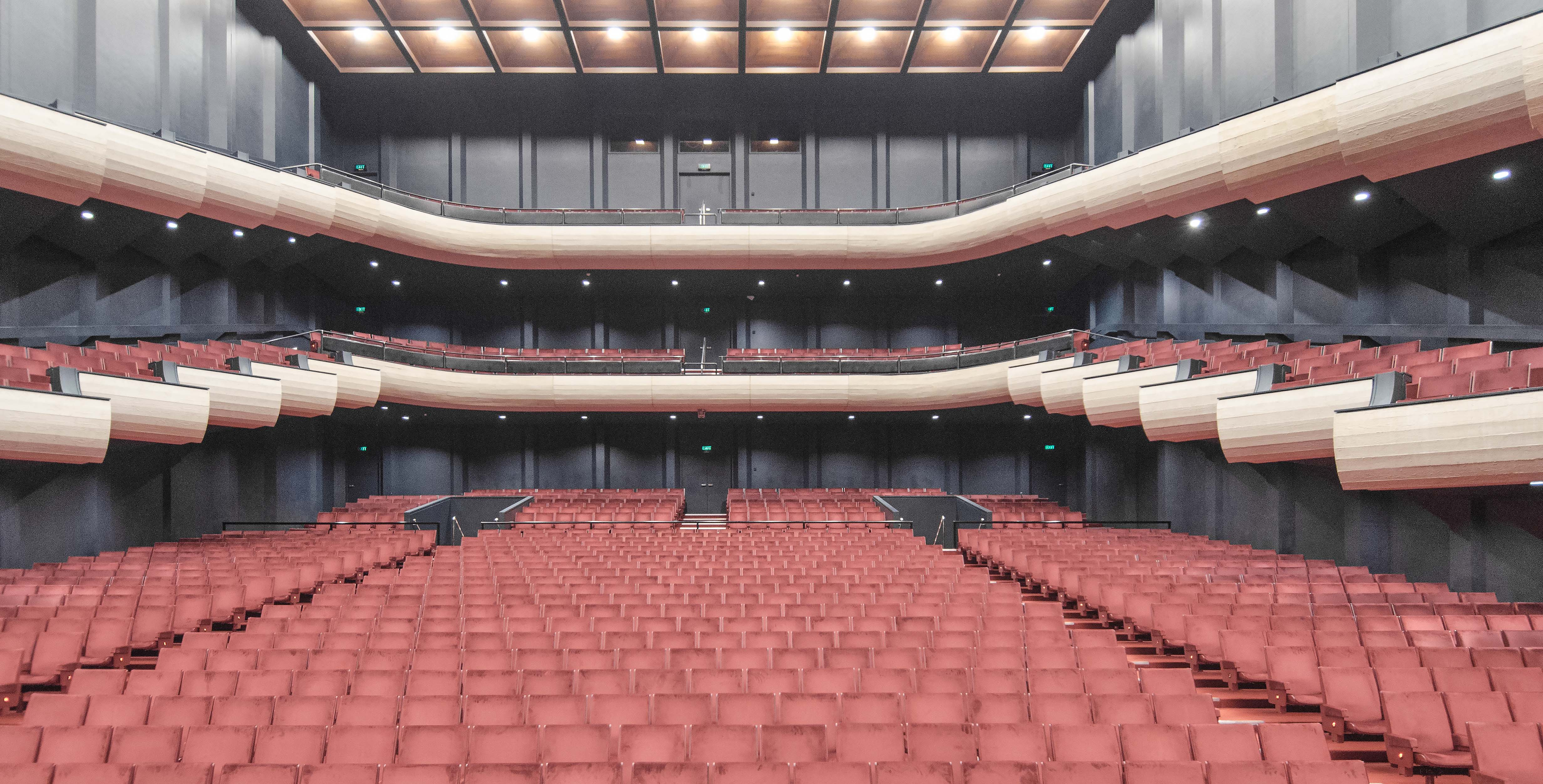

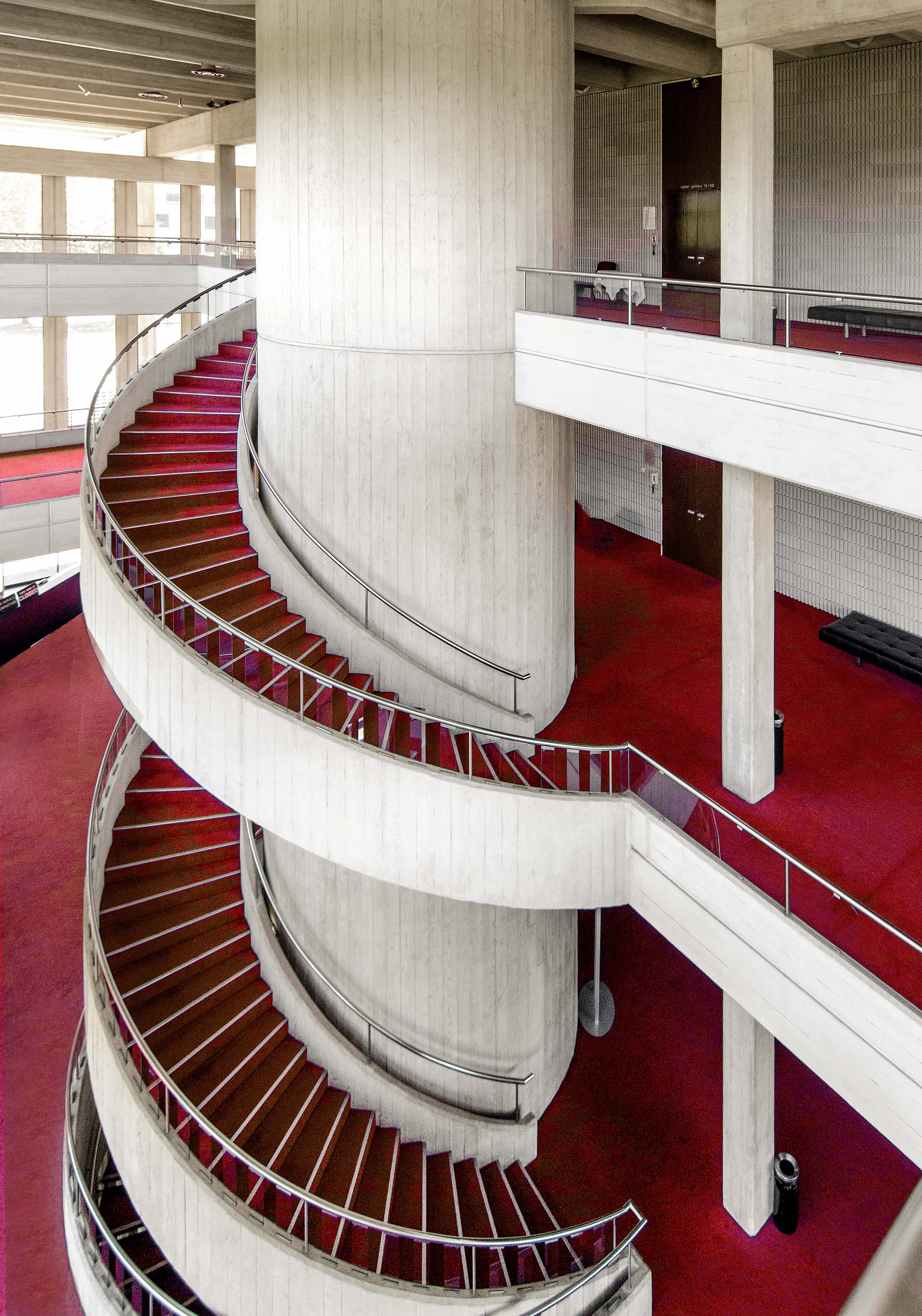

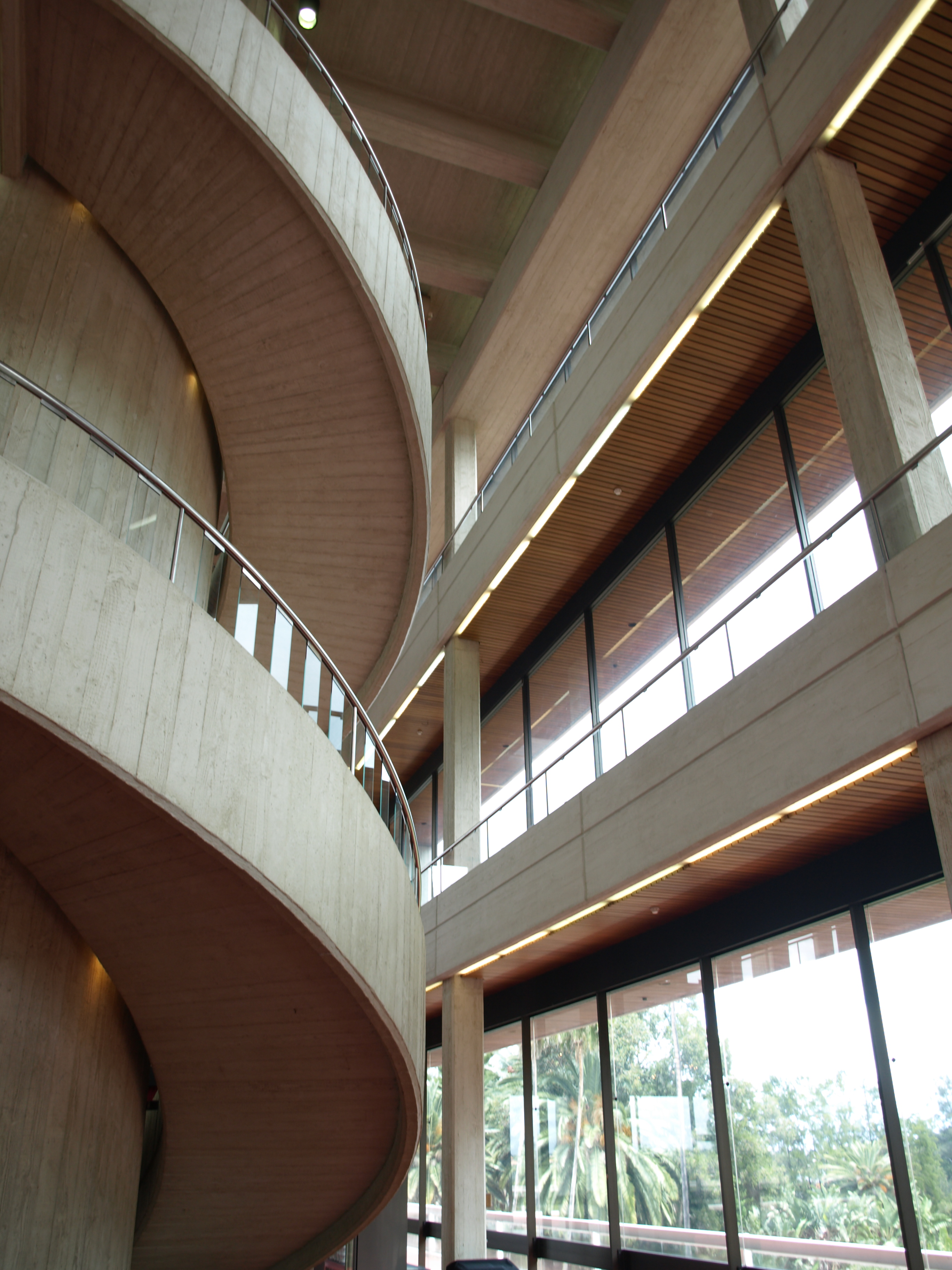

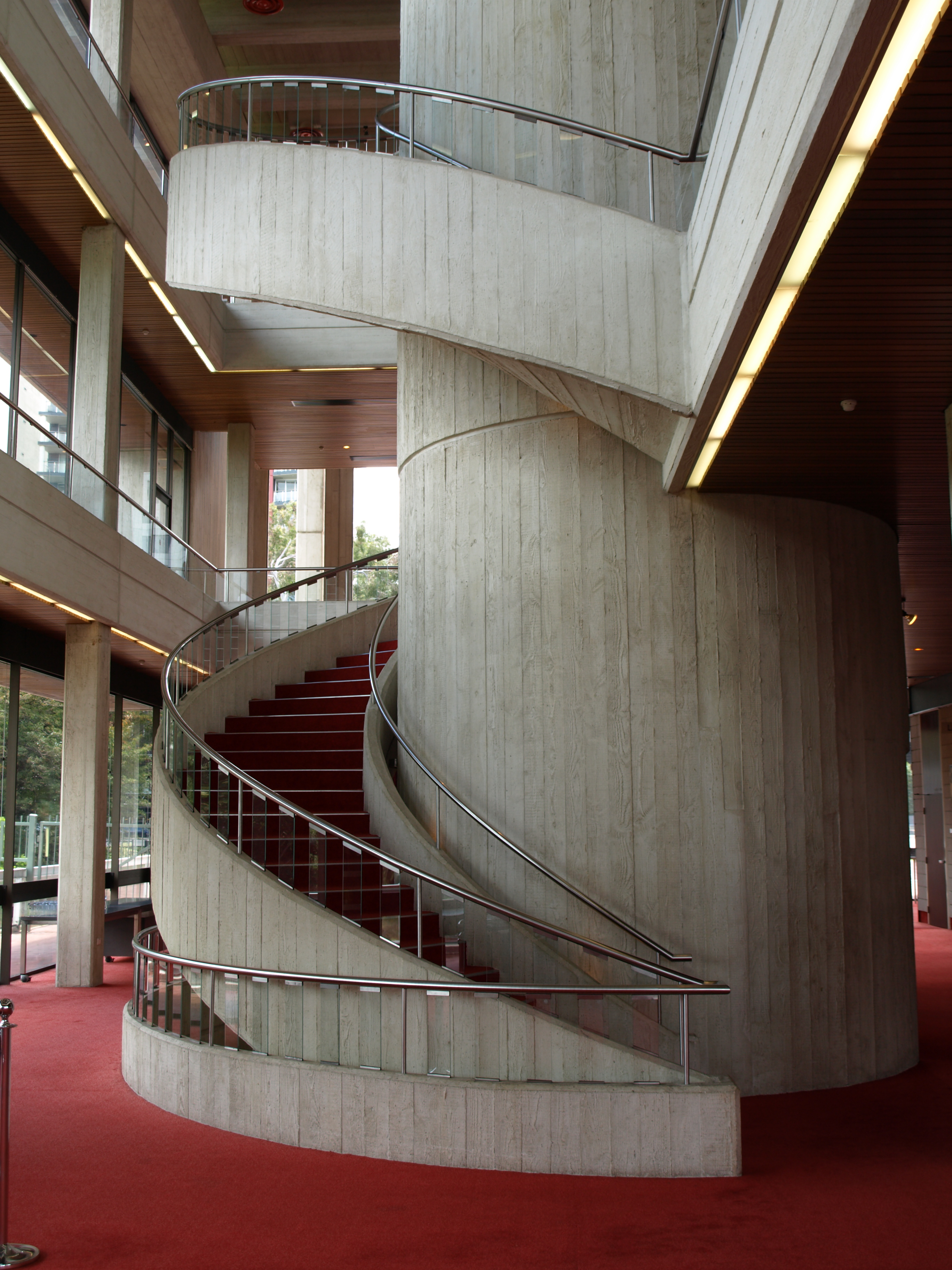

== See also ==
- List of concert halls
- Stripped Classicism
- List of Brutalist structures

== Sources ==
- Department of Infrastructure, Transport, Regional Development, Communications and the Arts (October 2020). Perth City Deal (PDF) (Report). Foreword by Scott Morrison, Mark McGowan and Andrew Hammond. Australian Government, Commonwealth of Australia. ISBN 978-1-925843-69-9. Archived (PDF) from the original on 23 November 2024.
- McAllister, Jenny; Templeman, David (7 January 2025). "Perth Concert Hall Redevelopment on Cue to Commence". Government of Western Australia (Press release).
