= Donald Bailey (architect) =

Australian architect (1927–2025)

Donald Campbell Bailey AM
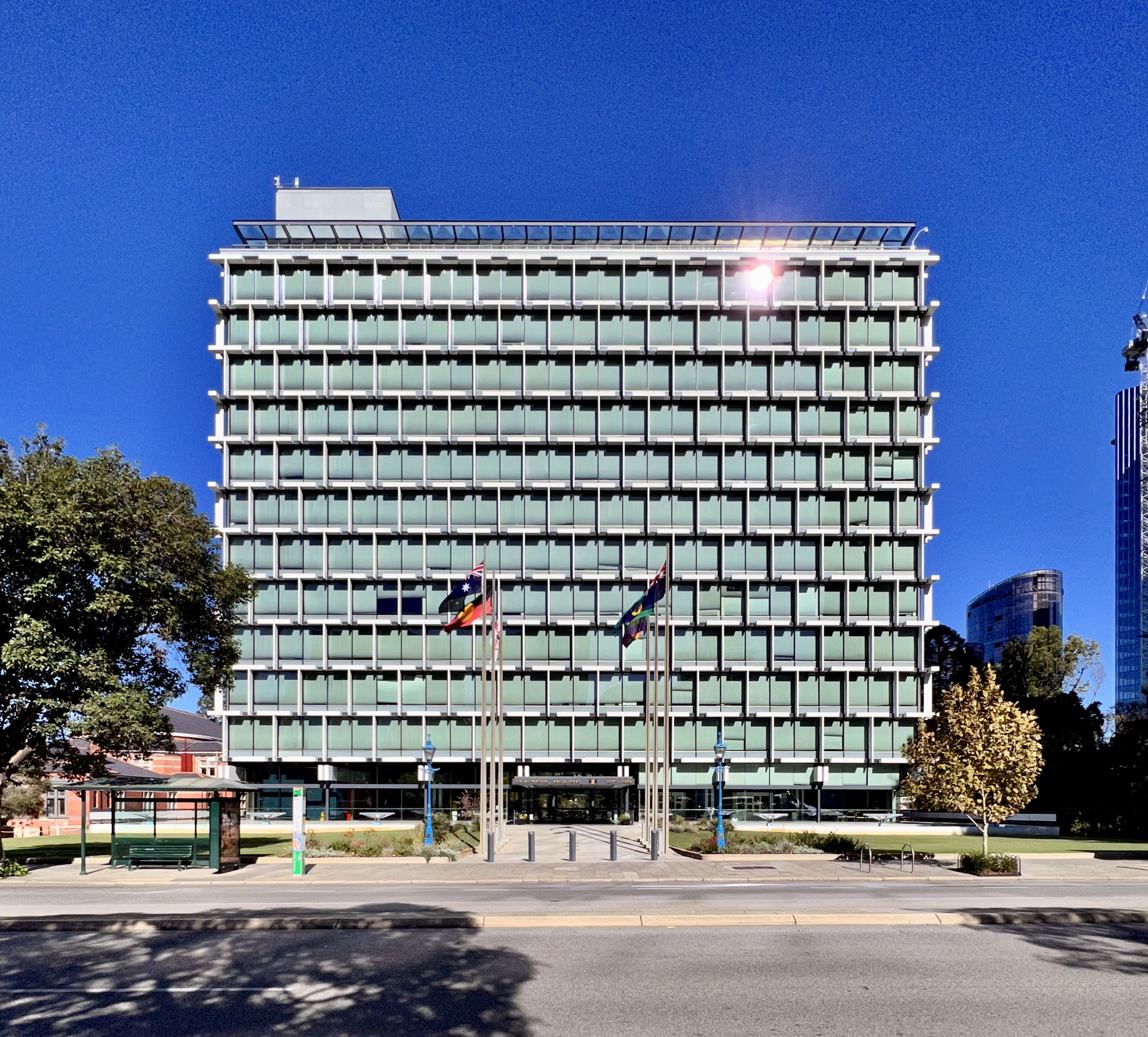
- Council House, Perth
- Born: 1 October 1927; Burwood, Victoria, Australia
- Died: 27 October 2025 (aged 98); Melbourne, Australia
- Education: University of Melbourne, Royal Melbourne Technical College
- Occupation: Architect
- Awards: Australian Institute of Architects Gold Medal, 1991 Richard Roach Jewell Award for Enduring Architecture, 2015 National Award for Enduring Architecture, 2015
- Practice: Stephenson and Turner; Howlett and Bailey Architects
- Buildings: Council House, Perth Reserve Bank of Australia Building, Canberra Perth Concert Hall, Western Australia

Donald Bailey (1 October 1927 – 27 October 2025), also known as Don Bailey, was an Australian architect, and executive director of the RAIA in Canberra after leaving private practice. In 1960 Donald Bailey established Howlett and Bailey Architects with Jeffrey Howlett in Perth, Western Australia. After winning the competition for Perth Town Hall, they went on and build a successful architecture practice in the 1960s with significant local projects including Perth Concert Hall.

== Early career ==
Whilst working at Stephenson and Turner, Donald met his future wife Janet, who was often seen playing the role of host at many RAIA committees and meetings. Initially Donald had worked at the architectural firm of Stephenson and Turner in Melbourne. He then took an opportunity to work overseas in England and Canada, travelling in Europe and North America for five years. He only to Australia in the mid 1950s.

== Institute of Architects role ==
Donald Bailey was a chief executive of the national secretariat of Australian Institute of Architects consisting of four divisional directors and a staff of eleven, including the practice division based in Melbourne. His tasks included assisting the President in representing the Institute at the highest levels of government and in national consultative bodies of the professions and the building industry and also advising the RAIA Executive on policy matters.

Reserve Bank of Australia in Canberra

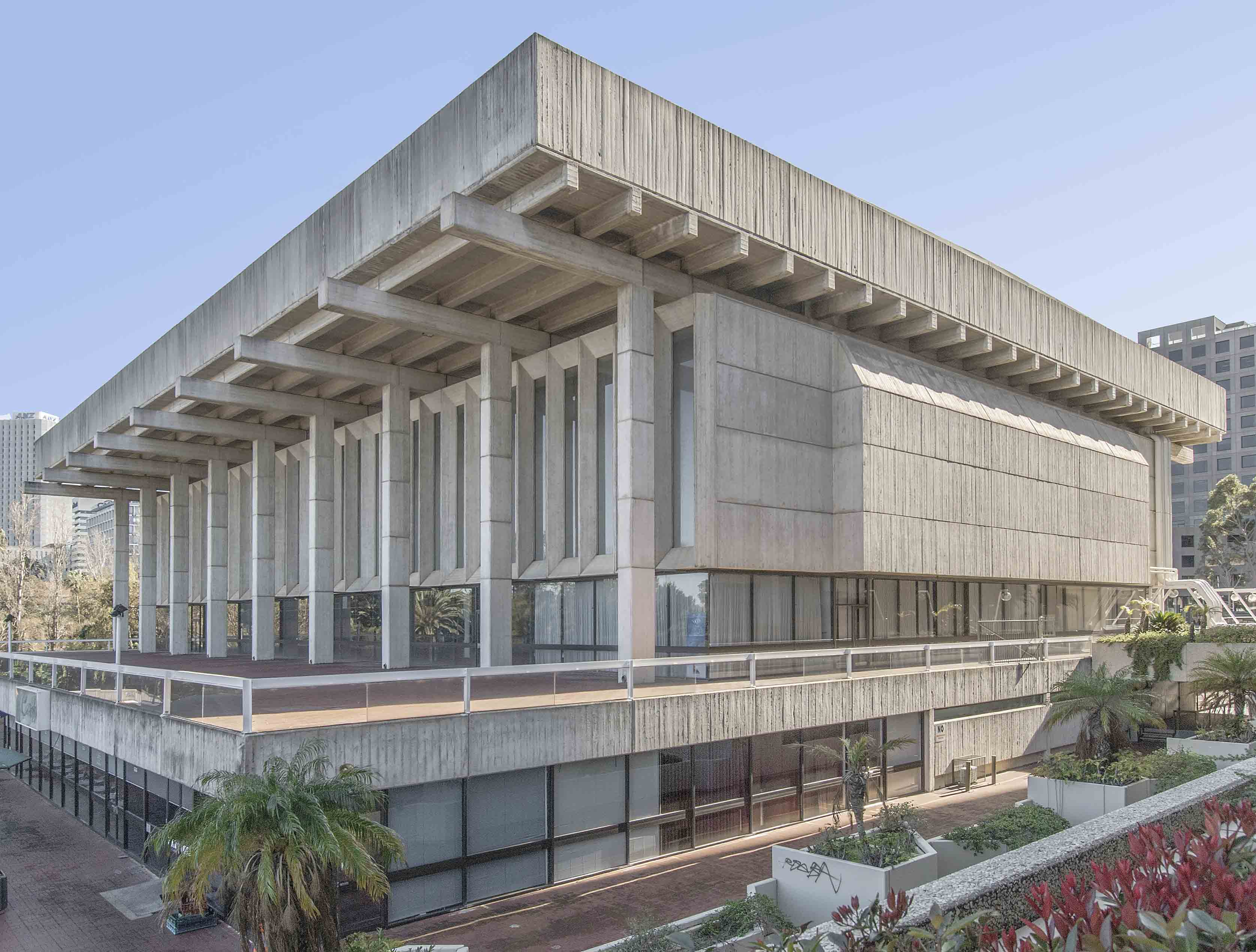
Perth Concert Hall, Western Australia

== Notable projects ==
- Perth Town Hall, (1960)
- Council House, Perth (1961–1963)
- Reserve Bank of Australia Building, Canberra (1967)
- Perth Concert Hall (1971–1973)

== Recognition ==
Donald Bailey was awarded a Member of the Order of Australia on 13 June 2005, for services to the architecture profession and particularly work with the Australian Institute of Architects and the Board of Architects of New South Wales.

== Awards and competitions ==
- New Perth City Council administration buildings competition (1960)
- Competition for a town hall and auditorium for Perth (1961)
