= Reserve Bank of Australia Building =

Reserve Bank of Australia Building may refer to:

- Reserve Bank of Australia Building, Canberra
- Reserve Bank of Australia Building, Sydney

== See also ==
- Reserve Bank of Australia
