= Jeffrey Howlett =

Australian architect

Jeffrey Howlett AM
- Born: 11 January 1928; Hyderabad, India
- Died: 20 December 2005 (aged 77); Perth, Australia
- Occupation: Architect
- Spouse: Katherine Howlett
- Children: Deborah Howlett, Greg Howlett, Mark Howlett
- Practice: Howlett & Bailey
- Buildings: Perth Council House; Perth Concert Hall; Reserve Bank of Australia Building, Canberra

Jeffrey William Hamilton Howlett (1928–2005) was a Western Australian modernist architect. Howlett was born in India, but later traveled to London for his studies and then moved to Perth, Australia for training to become an architect. Throughout his life, he won various competitions with his partner Donald Bailey. Howlett acknowledged the reality of late-twentieth-century cities and, through his architecture, suggested a way of making sense of the disorder. He was a founding partner of Howlett & Bailey, along with Bailey, which designed a number of Australian landmarks such as Council House and the Perth Concert Hall.

== Biography ==
Howlett was born in, and spent his early life in Hyderabad, India. In 1945, he accepted a scholarship to the Architectural Association School of Architecture in London. After five years Howlett completed his diploma and worked at the London County Council under the direction of Leslie Martin for a year before returning to India to marry. He moved, along with his family to Perth. While in Perth, Howlett started working with several local practices before relocating to Melbourne. He was granted a position as senior design Architect with the architectural firm of Bates Smart. While in Melbourne, Howlett, together with Donald Bailey, won the Australia-Wide competition for the design of the new Perth City Council administration buildings. This brought him back to Perth where he would stay for the remainder of his life. Later, Howlett And Bailey won "The Public Suite", a competition for a series of performance halls.

In 1993, Howlett survived a major stroke. The stroke caused him serious damage making him unable to continue practicing as an architect though he eventually learned to work with his left hand on small tray-bound paper which was later assembled into larger sheets. He used oil pastel as paint with a rich surface and startling colours. His forms were bold and simple, and his drawings became his major form of communication, a way of evoking memory and telling stories of his past and present.

Later on in his life, Howlett and Bailey won many design awards and competitions from the Royal Australian Institute of Architects (RIFA), and in 1973, Howlett was honored by the RAIA with Life Fellowship.

== Projects ==
Howlett, along with Bailey, were the architects for the Perth Concert Hall located in the Perth central business district, which was constructed between 1971 and 1973. It is used mainly for musical performances and other events. The architectural design mainly consists of two buildings. One building has offices and the other, which is oval in shape, contains the auditorium. Throughout 1969, the plans were adjusted several times. These adjustments included beautification and landscaping of the main pedestrian approach from St Georges Terrance and one construction of a subway system under the terrace. This building is an example of brutalist architecture, with its solid opaque interior, imposing projecting roof, and use of white off-form concrete.

The Perth Council House is a 13-story office built beside Stirling Gardens on St Georges Terrace. The building was designed by Howlett and Bailey and opened in 1963. Known for its modernist style, there has been many debates about its heritage value. Some consider this building to be an important example of modernist architecture. Known as "a remarkably simple solution to a complex situation", the building is the first to have a complete window walling to reduce heat from entering the building.

== Exhibitions ==
In 1992, a retrospective exhibition titled the "Howlett Architectural Projects" was curated by Michael Markham and Peter Brew. It took place at the University of Western Australia, focusing on the periods when Howlett was a visiting professor at the school of Architecture. In 2002, an exhibition on Howlett's pastel works was held at Perth Galleries featuring his drawing, which showed him staring straight out, foursquare, strong and forthright, his jaw thrusting forward in a determined set. It also portrayed his life and the changes he made to various buildings in Perth.

== Awards ==
- Australia-wide design competition (New Perth City Council Administration Buildings)
- The Public Suite (Perth concert Hall)
- Competition for the Reserve Bank in Canberra
- RAIA (RAIA with Life Fellowship) with Life Fellowship

== Recognition ==
In 2000 Howlett was recognised with a Member of the Order of Australia for service to architecture as a designer and educator.
