= Richard Roach Jewell Award for Enduring Architecture =

Annual award for culturally significant buildings in Western Australia

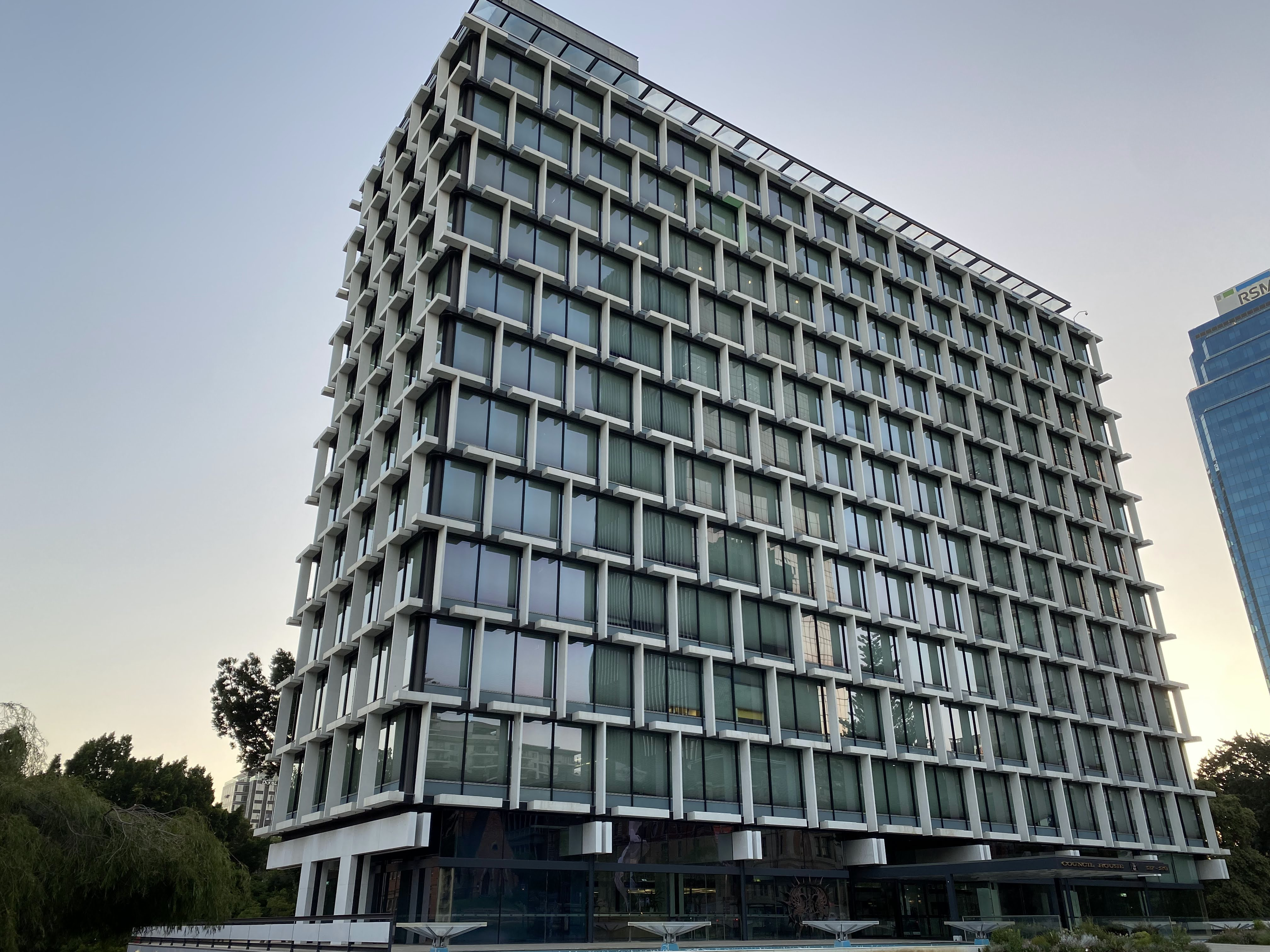
- Council House, 2015 Western Australia and National Enduring Architecture Award
- Awarded for: Outstanding Western Australian architecture over 25 years or more
- Country: Australia
- Presented by: Australian Institute of Architects (West Australia Chapter)
- First award: 2015; 11 years ago
- Currently held by: Forbes and Fitzhardinge, 2026 Award

The Richard Roach Jewell Award for Enduring Architecture is an architecture prize presented annually by the West Australian Chapter of the Australian Institute of Architects (AIA) since the inaugural award was presented in 2015. The award recognises significant, long lasting and innovative architecture with usually more than 25 years passed since the completion of construction.

== Background ==
The Award recognises achievement for the design of buildings of outstanding merit, which have remained important as high quality works of architecture when considered in contemporary cultural, social, economic and environmental contexts in the state of Western Australia. Nominations for the award can be made by AIA members, non–members and non–architects, but they must provide adequate material and information supporting the nomination for consideration of the jury. The Award also provides opportunity to recognise buildings that were not previously submitted into annual AIA awards programs.

The average age of the 12 projects recognised between 2015 and 2026 is 50.8 years from completion of construction to year of award.

=== Naming of award ===
The inaugural award presented in 2015 was known as the Enduring Architecture Award in line with other states. In 2016 it became a 'named award' in recognition of 19th century colonial architect Richard Roach Jewell.

== National Award winners ==
Recipients of the state–based award are eligible for consideration for the National Award for Enduring Architecture presented later in the same year, as part of the Australian National Architecture Awards.

Two projects located in Western Australia have won the national award, both by Howlett and Bailey Architects. In 2015 the restored Council House won both the state and national award, 52 years after the building was completed in 1963. In the following year, Perth Concert Hall was awarded the 2016 national award.

== Multiple Award winners ==
Two Perth based firms, Howlett and Bailey Architects and Cameron Chisholm Nicol have both won the award on two occasions.

== Award recipients ==
Richard Roach Jewell Award for Enduring Architecture (reverse order)
Year	Architect	Project	Location	Year built	Years since	Other AIA Awards
2026	Forbes and Fitzhardinge (with partner in charge Anthony Brand)	UWA Conservatorium of Music	University of Western Australia, Hackett Drive, Crawley	1978	48 years	
2025	Forbes and Fitzhardinge	CRA Advanced Technology Building (now Brodie-Hall Building); Building 610	Turner Avenue, Curtin University, Bentley	1989	36 years	Triennial Architecture Medal, 1993 (WA Chapter); Architecture Medal 1994, (WA Chapter); Architecture Award, 1990
2024	Summerhayes and Associates	CBH Building	22 Delhi Street, West Perth	1968	55 years	Bronze Medal, 1969
2023	Julius Elischer	Wollaston College Chapel	5 Wollaston Road, Mount Claremont	1965	58 years	
2022	Hobbs Winning Leighton Partners (John Lidbury) and With Architecture Studio	Christ Church Grammar School Chapel	Queenslea Drive, Claremont	1970	52 years	Bronze Medal, 1970
2021	Iwan Iwanoff	Town of Northam Council Offices and Library (now Shire of Northam)	298 Fitzgerald Street, Northam	1973	48 years	
2020	Rodney Alsop and Conrad Sayce	Hackett Memorial Buildings	University of Western Australia, Mounts Bay Road, Crawley	1932	88 years	Royal Institute of British Architects Bronze Medal, 1931
2019	Harry Seidler	QV1	250 St Georges Terrace, Perth	1991	37 years	Architecture Design Award, Commercial buildings over $200m, 1992 (WA); Commendation, Civic Design Award for Commercial Buildings, 1992 (WA); Best design for a commercial building over $200m, 1992 (National)
2018	Cameron Chisholm Nicol	Allendale Square (office tower)	77 St Georges Terrace, Perth	1976	42 years	Design Award, 1978; Bronze Medal, 1981 (WA Chapter)
2017	Cameron Chisholm Nicol	Reid Library	University of Western Australia, Crawley	1964	51 years	Royal Institute of British Architects (RIBA) 1964 Bronze Medal
2016	Howlett and Bailey Architects	Perth Concert Hall	5 St Georges Terrace, Perth	1973	43 years	National Award for Enduring Architecture, 2016
2015	Howlett and Bailey Architects	Council House	27–29 St Georges Terrace, Perth	1963	52 years	National Award for Enduring Architecture, 2015

== Gallery ==
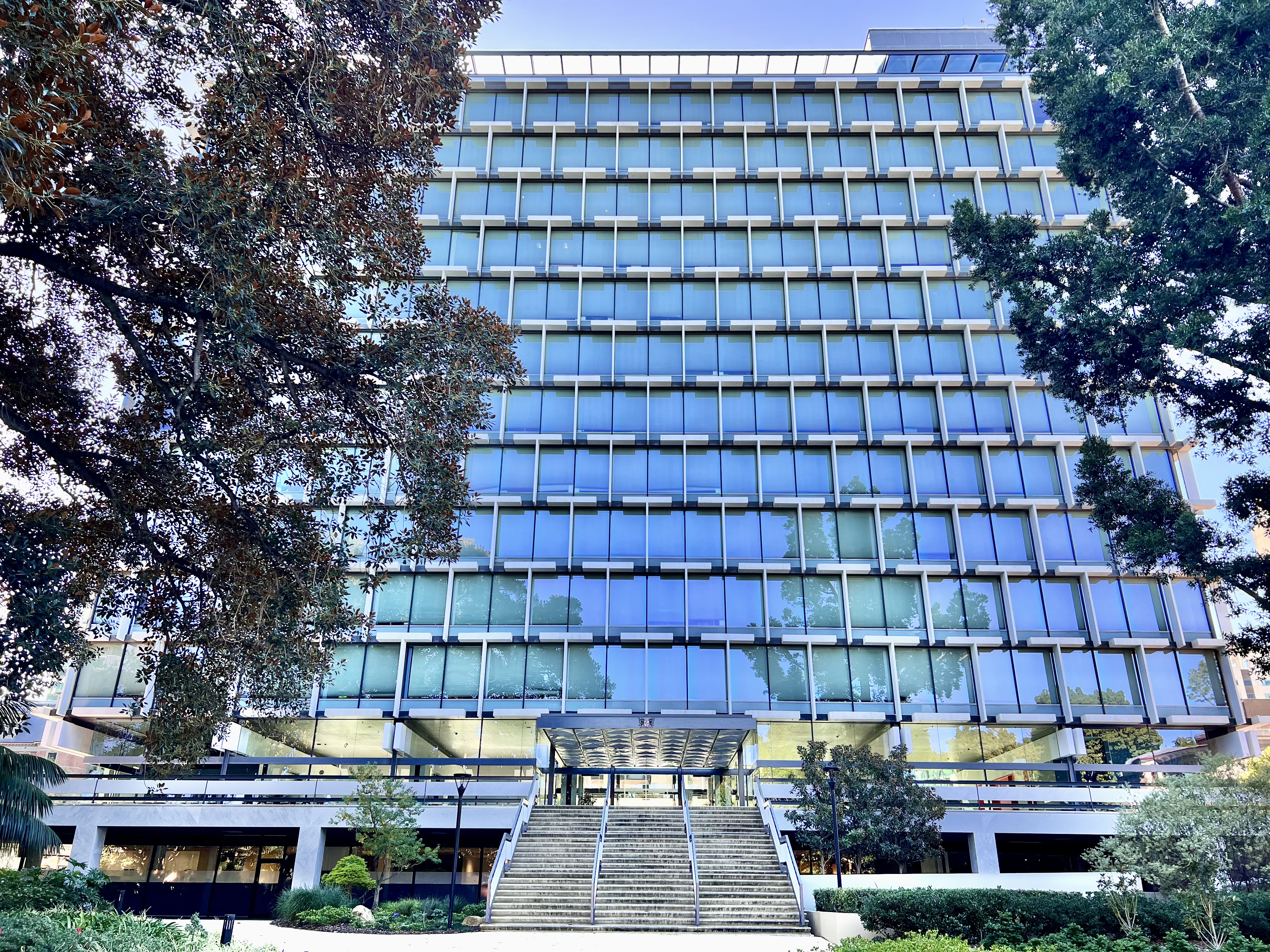
2015 Award, Council House, opened 1963

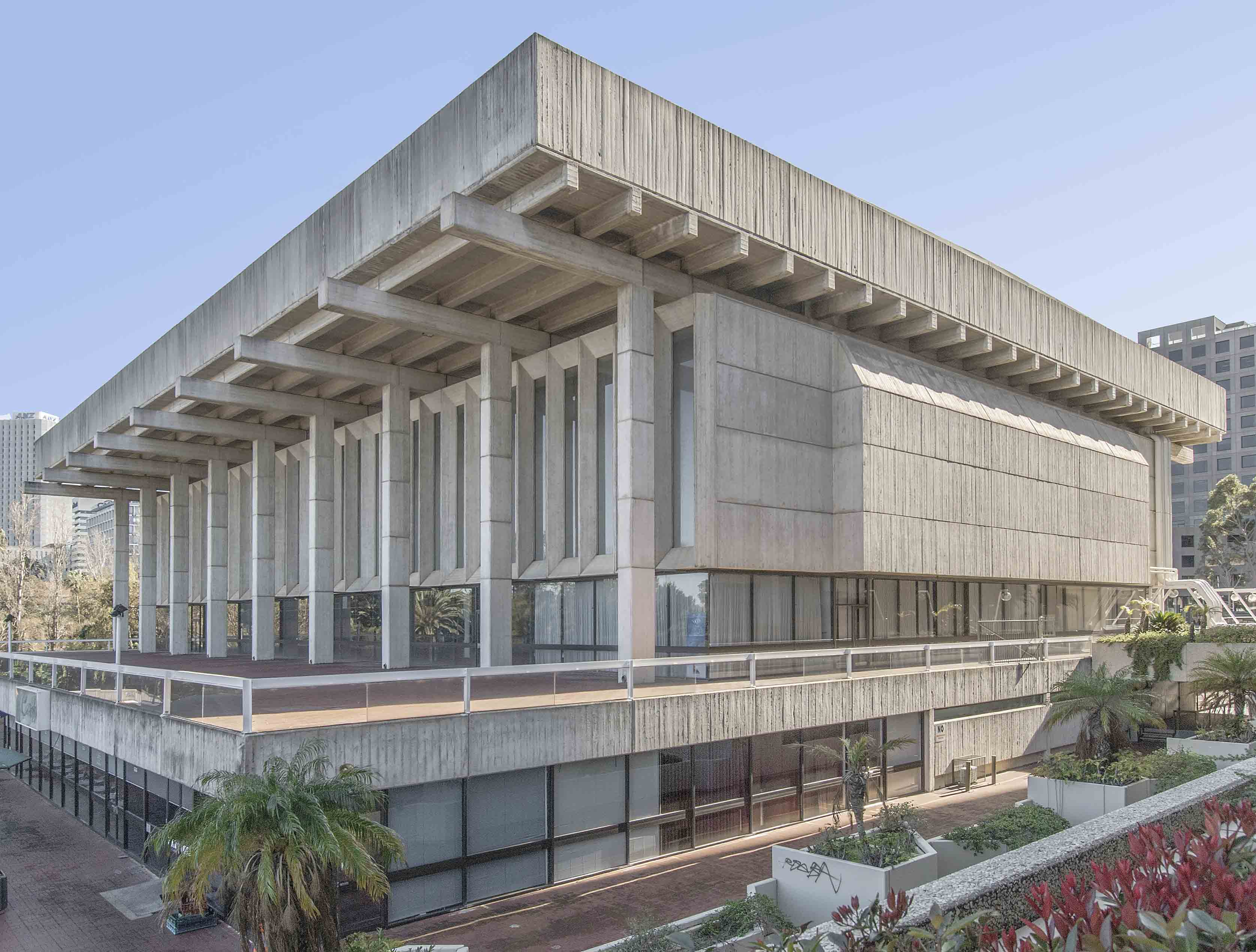
2016 Award, Perth Concert Hall, opened 1973

2017 Award, Reid Library UWA, opened 1964

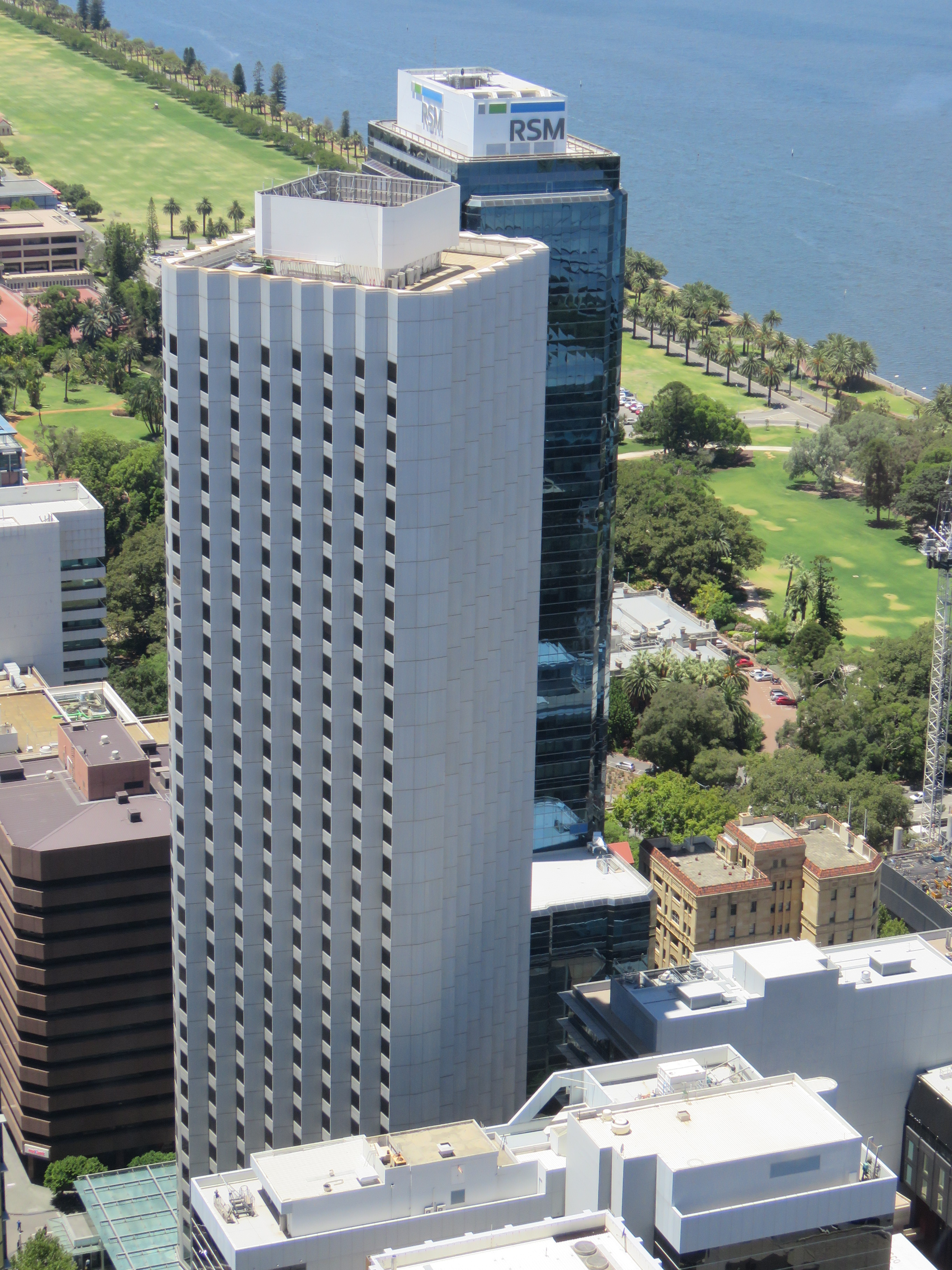
2018 Award, Allendale Square, opened 1976

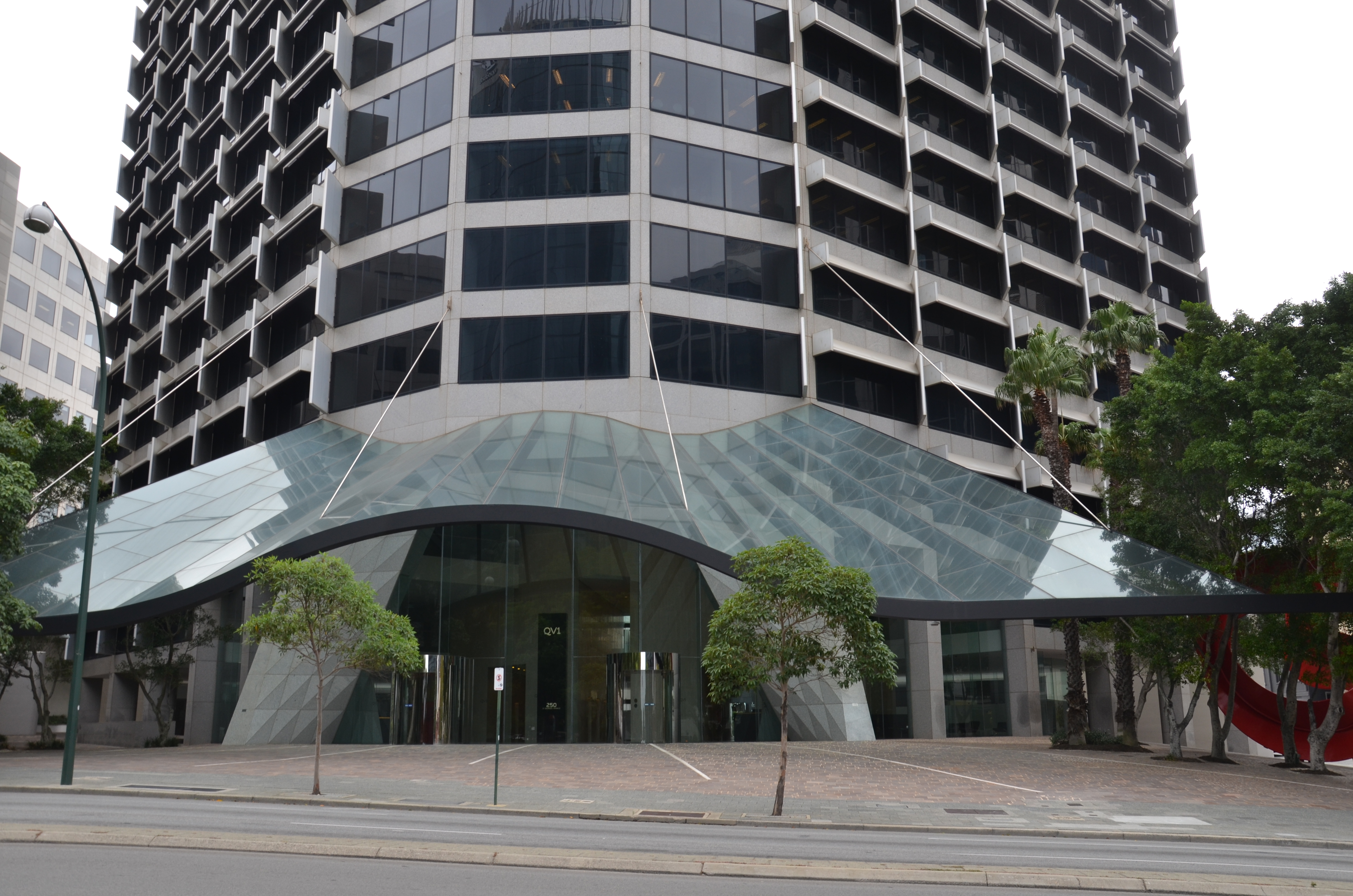
2019 Award, QV1 Tower, opened 1991

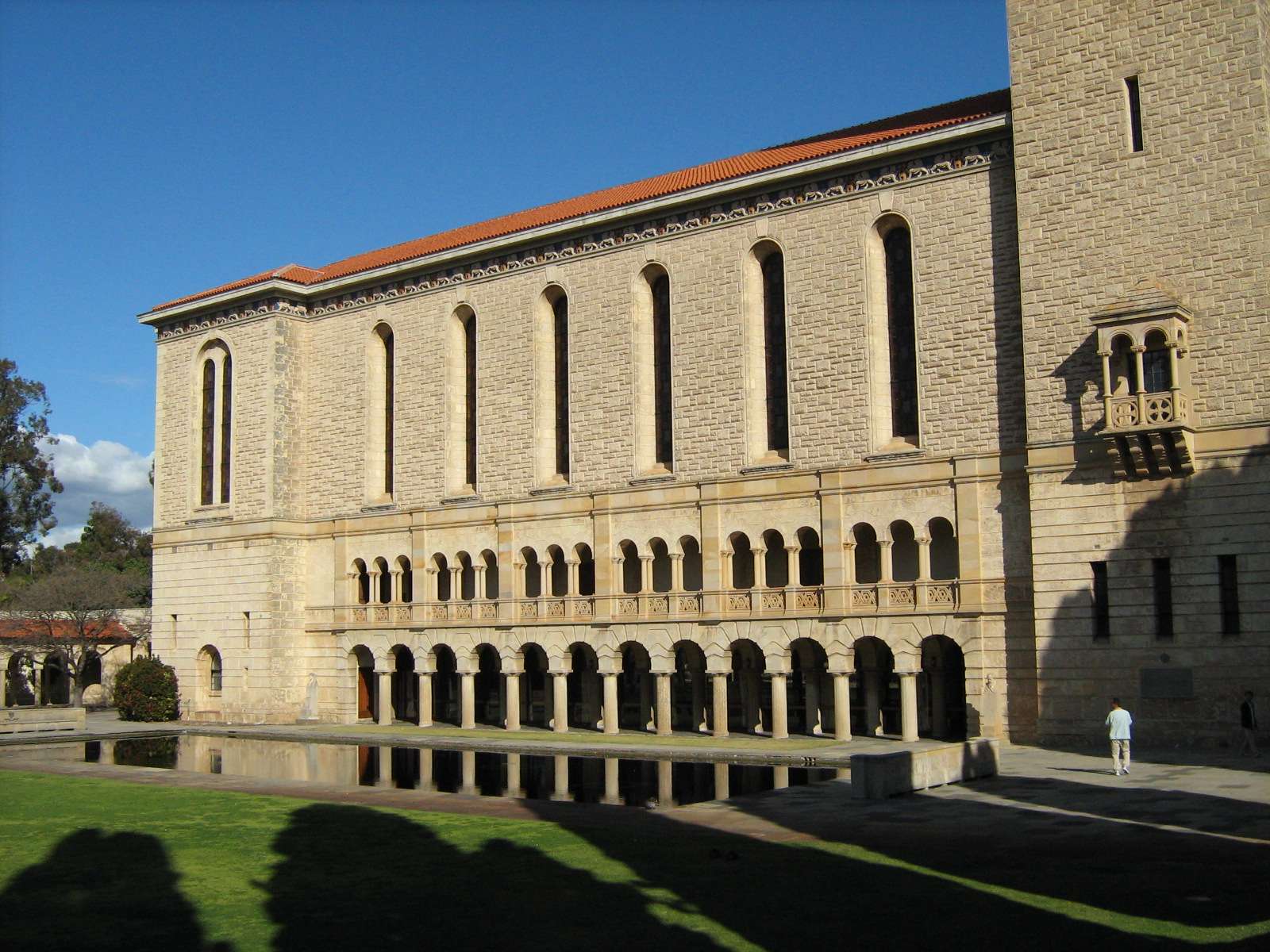
2020 Award, Hackett Memorial Buildings (Winthrop Hall), opened 1932

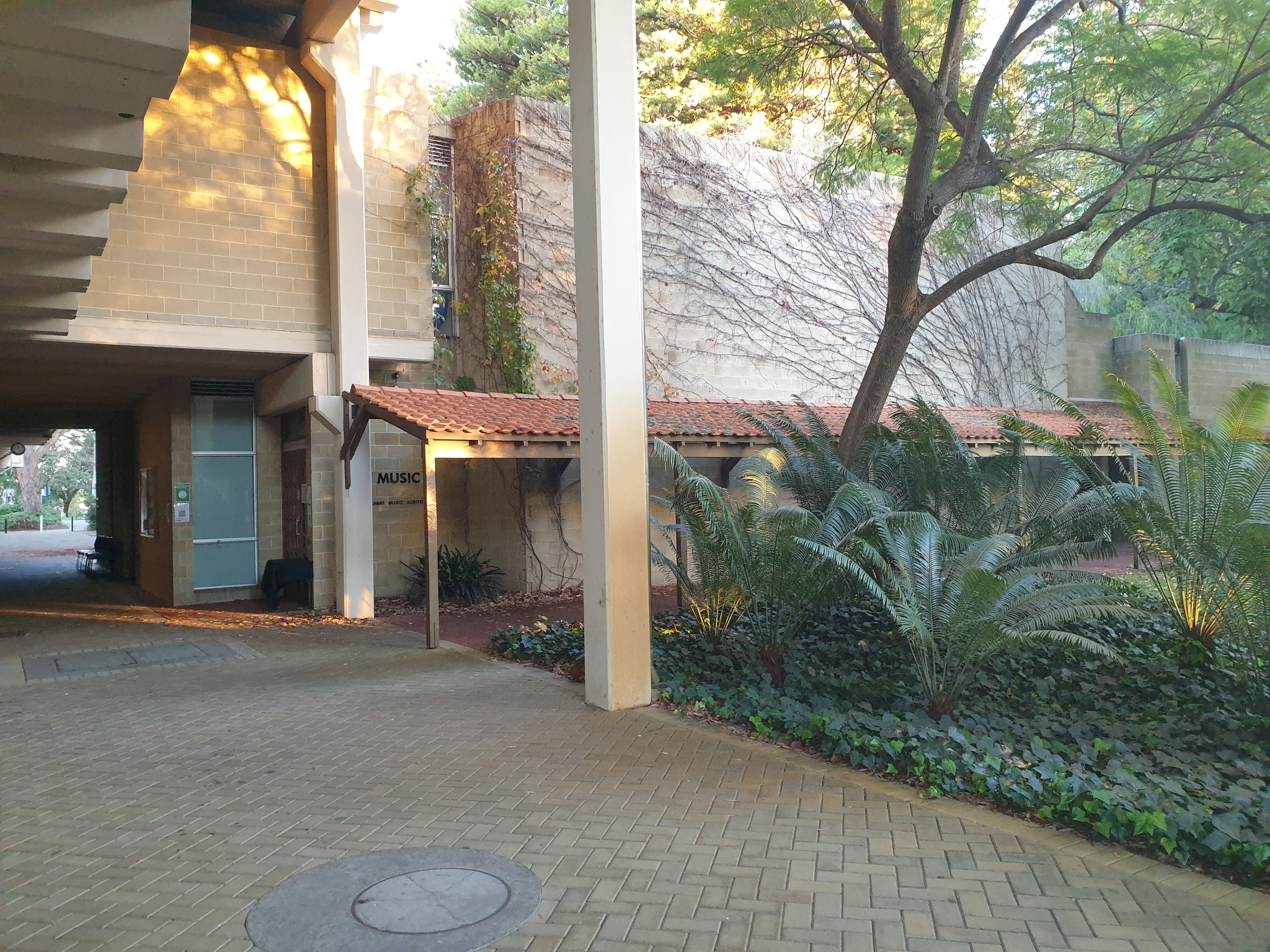
2026 Award, UWA Conservatorium of Music, opened 1978

== See also ==
- Australian Institute of Architects
- Australian Institute of Architects Awards and Prizes
- National Award for Enduring Architecture
- Sir Roy Grounds Award for Enduring Architecture
