= Howlett and Bailey Architects =

Architecture business in Perth, Australia

Howlett and Bailey

Practice information
- Founders: Jeffrey Howlett; Donald Bailey
- Founded: 1960
- Dissolved: 1995
- Location: Perth, Western Australia

Significant works and honors
- Projects: Council House, Perth; Perth Concert Hall; Reserve Bank of Australia Building, Canberra
- Awards: Richard Roach Jewell Award for Enduring Architecture, 2015 & 2016; National Award for Enduring Architecture, 2015 & 2016

Howlett and Bailey Architects was founded in 1960 by young architects Jeffrey Howlett AM and Donald Bailey AM, based in Perth, Western Australia. They received numerous design awards and commendations from the Royal Australian Institute of Architects and won the design competition for the Reserve Bank of Australia Building in Canberra in 1962. Their designs combined Modern style and Classical rationale, which resulted in ordered and axial aspects. Howlett and Baileys Architects's major projects included the Public Suite, kiosk and manager's house (now demolished) at Beatty Park Pool, and the two Perth landmarks – Council House (1962) and Perth Concert Hall (1973).

== Founders ==
=== Jeffrey Howlett ===
Jeffrey Howlett (1928–2005), a founder of the Howlett and Bailey Architects firm, is known as a pioneer of Western Australian Modernist architect. He was awarded as a State Living Treasure by the Western Australian and the Life Fellowship by the RAIA in 1978. In 2000, due to his contributions to architecture as a designer and pedagogue, he was nominated a Member of the Order of Australia. After spending his early life in Hyderabad, India, Howlett came to England to receive his scholarship for Diploma in Architectural Association School of Architecture in London. From 1950, he worked in England for the London County Council before moving to Australia to work with several of Perth's practices. Later, Howlett moved to Melbourne to continue his career as a Senior Design architect with Bates Smart and Mc Cutcheon. In Melbourne, together with Donald Bailey, won the new Perth City Council administration buildings competition. Howlett and Bailey Architects was formed on relocation to Perth to continue work on the competition winning project. Donald Bailey described Howlett as a specially talent and creative designer. A 1992 exhibition of Howlett's work was hosted by University of Western Australia, named Howlett: Architectural projects. After suffering a major stroke in 1993, he came to rely on a wheelchair and mainly used oil pastel and paper to continue expressing his creativity through forms and colours. An exhibition at Perth Galleries in 2002 displayed his art works and presented his memories, past and present.

== Major projects ==
=== Council House, Perth ===
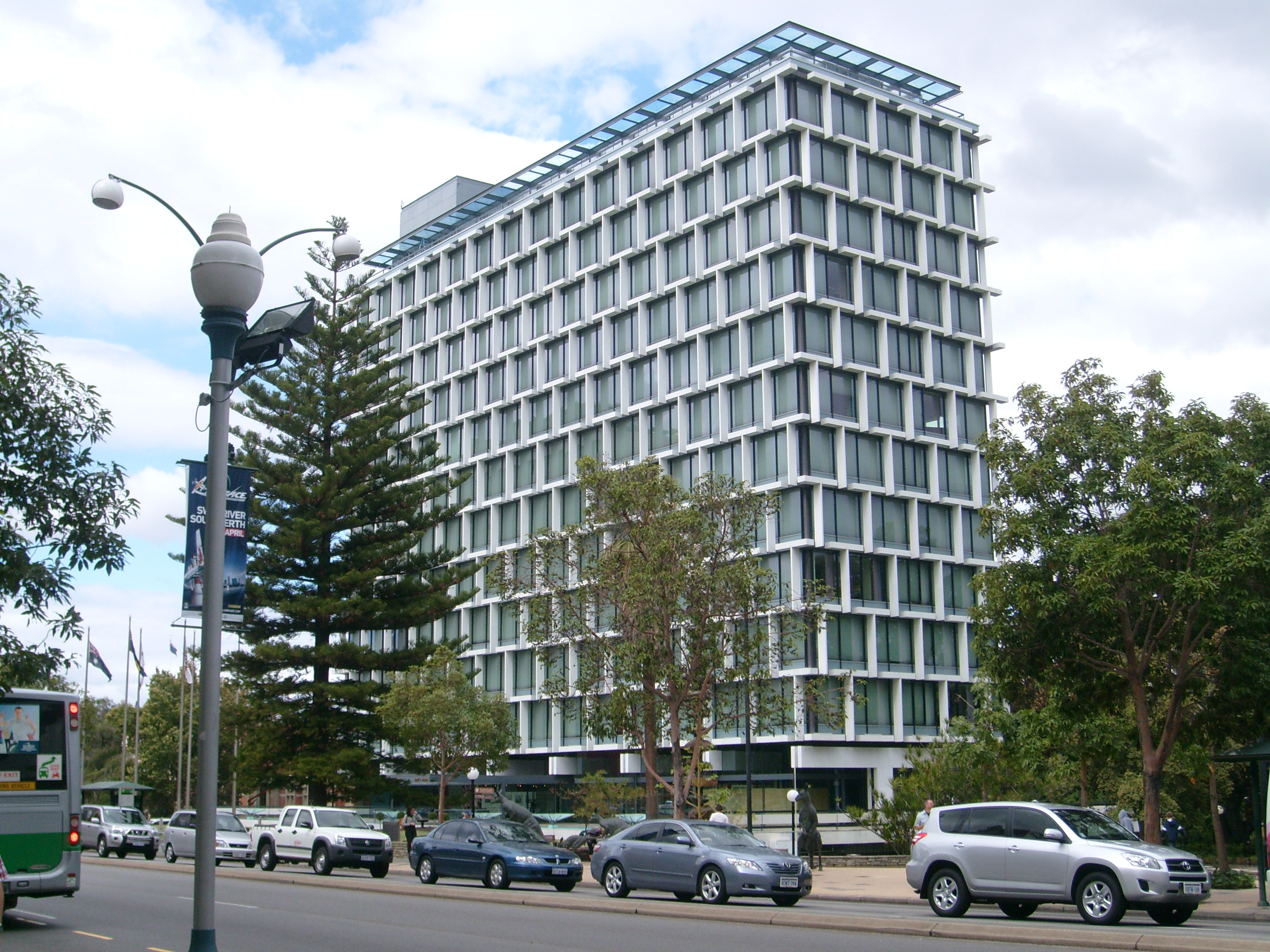
Council House, Perth

Because Perth was hosting the British Empire and Commonwealth Games in 1962, the Perth City Council decided to construct a new headquarters with a modern design to showcase the development of the state. Howlett and Bailey won the competition for the new administration building with their Council House design in 1960, out of 61 entries. Council House was opened by Queen Elizabeth II in a ceremony in 1963. The design reflects the minimalist modern style. The interior was designed to give maximum working floor space in relation to its floorplate. The façade is constructed with a curtain wall system and iconic T-shaped sun hoods.

=== Perth Concert Hall ===
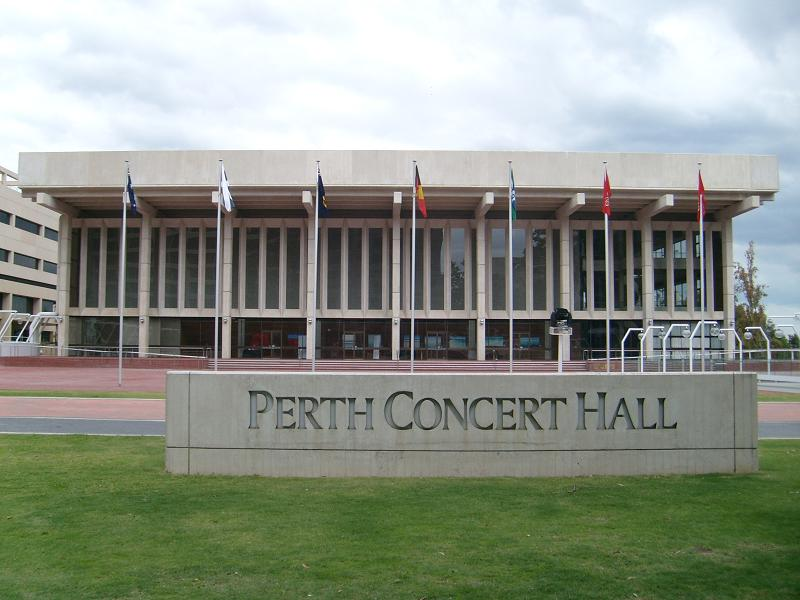
Perth concert hall

In 1968, Howlett and Bailey Architects was appointed to design the Perth Concert Hall. The building was constructed in 1971 and 1972 and was officially opened on 26 January 1973. The architectural style can be described as Brutalist. The Concert Hall is covered by a large flat projecting white off-form concrete roof. The hall holds up to 1720 people.

== Later mergers ==
Howlett and Bailey Architects merged with Cox Architecture in 1995 to form Cox Howlett & Bailey Architects. In 1998 the company merged again, with Forbes & Fitzhardinge Woodland to form Cox Howlett & Bailey Woodland Architects, and now as Cox Architecture.
