= Margo Lewers =

Australian painter and sculptor

- Born: 23 April 1908
- Died: 20 February 1978 (aged 69)
- Education: Late 1920s evening classes with Antonio Dattilo-Rubbo 1934–35 Central School of Arts and Crafts, London 1940–45 evening classes with Desiderius Orban, Sydney
- Known for: Painting, sculpture, mosaics, ceramics, tapestries
- Movement: Modernism, Australian modernism, abstract art

Margo Lewers (23 April 1908 – 20 February 1978) was an Australian interdisciplinary abstract artist who worked across the media of painting, sculpture, tapestry, ceramics and the domestic arts. She was renowned for a number of major public commissions and for her landscaping and interior design for the family home at Emu Plains. Her early compositions explored colour and formal geometric abstraction; her work became more fluid and expressionist by the early 1960s. She showed extensively in Australia and in several international travelling exhibitions. She won at least fourteen awards and prizes. The Penrith Regional Gallery and Lewers Bequest now stands on her property at Emu Plains.

== Early life and education ==
Margo Lewers, née Plate, was born in Mosman, Sydney, to Adolph Gustav Plate (1874–1913), a German-born grazier, seaman, writer and artist, and his English-born wife Elsie Gill, née Burton. She was the older sister of artist Carl Plate. In the late 1920s she attended Antonio Dattilo-Rubbo's evening art classes where she met her future husband, Gerald Lewers. Travelling to Europe with Gerald, Lewers studied at the Central School of Arts and Crafts, London in 1934 and 1935. In Sydney, between 1940 and 1945, she completed further evening classes with Desiderius Orban.

== Career ==
Early in her career, Margo Lewers opened the interior design shop Notanda Galleries. The shop was based on Bauhaus principles, operating as a design consultancy, and stocked pottery, furniture, handprinted objects and timber objects. During this period, Lewers worked on linen and ceramics toward a solo show at Argosy Gallery. She also worked on creating complementary interior design pieces for the family home, designing wooden furniture to match a cream base in ceramics and linen. Notanda Galleries operated from 1935 to 1939, closing due to wartime restrictions.

In the 1940s, Lewers became a member of the Sydney branch of the Contemporary Art Society and exhibited in their annual exhibitions. The Art Gallery of New South Wales' first art purchase from the Contemporary Art Society was Margo Lewers' work Composition in Blue.

In 1951, Margo Lewers and Gerald Lewers, with their two children Tanya and Darani, moved to Emu Plains. In 1952, Lewers and Gerald held a two-person exhibition at the David Jones Art Gallery, exhibiting painting and sculpture respectively. James Gleeson reviewed Lewers' painting as ambitious but requiring better development of technique. Following the initiative in landscape design and outdoor sculpture that the pair made in their new home, in 1957, Lewers and Gerald were commissioned to create a garden of pebbles, cacti and sandstone for the MLC Building in North Sydney.

In 1960, Lewers held a solo exhibition at Gallery A, an important contemporary art space in Sydney. Two years later, Gerald died, and in 1965 Lewers completed his major public commission, "Expansion", for the Reserve Bank in Canberra. In 1966, Lewers held a solo show of paintings at Macquarie Galleries, and in 1968 she received a further major commission from the Reserve Bank of Australia for a tapestry for their boardroom.

=== Reception and legacy ===
Margo Lewers exhibited frequently throughout her lifetime in both group and solo shows and her work was collected by major state galleries. In 1967, she was the subject of the winning portrait for the annual Archibald Prize, painted by Judy Cassab.

While still alive, Lewers began the process of bequeathing her home and the couple's collection of artworks to the local community. In 1981, the Penrith Regional Gallery and Lewers Bequest opened. The site houses Lewers House, Anchers House, a purpose-built gallery, cafe and landscaped gardens.

Since her death, Lewers has received two major retrospectives. A House Full of Paintings, curated by Nina Stromqvist at Penrith Regional Gallery in 2023, and Margo Lewers Retrospective at SH Ervin Gallery, curated by Pamela Bell, 2002. The latter exhibition toured to six regional galleries. She has also been included in a small number of group shows. These include Women of Influence, Ivan Dougherty Gallery, Sydney, 2005 and Sydney 6, Newcastle Art Gallery, Newcastle, 2015.

== Work ==
=== Public collections ===
- Art Gallery of New South Wales
- Art Gallery of Western Australia
- Cruthers Collection of Women's Art
- Mosman Art Gallery
- National Gallery of Australia
- National Gallery of Victoria
- Penrith Regional Art Gallery and Lewers Bequest
- Queensland Art Gallery
- UNSW
