= Council House, Perth =

Office building in Perth, Western Australia

Council House
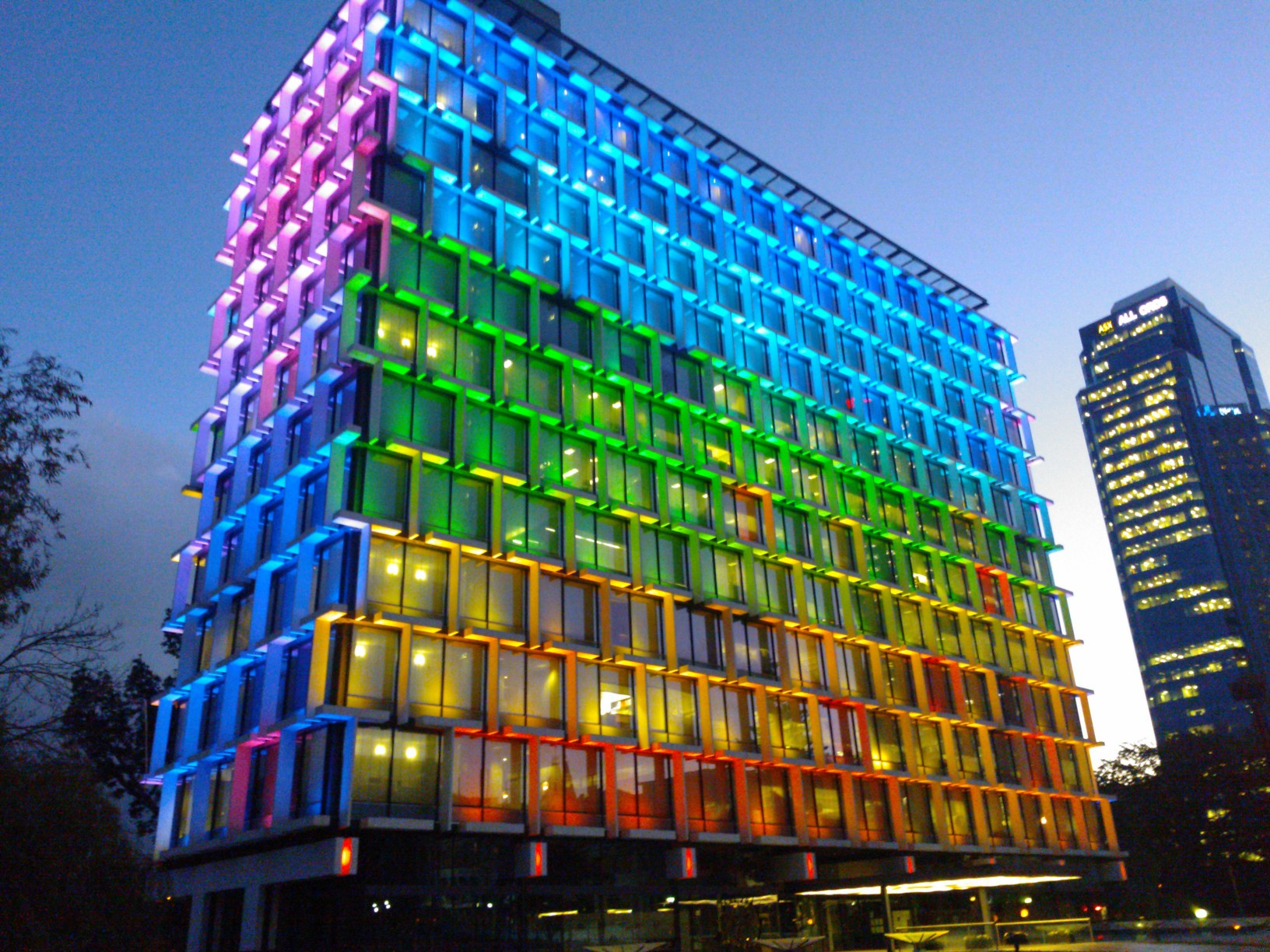
- Council House
- Interactive map of the Council House area

General information
- Type: Office building
- Location: 27–29 St Georges Terrace, Perth, Western Australia
- Coordinates: 31°57′24″S 115°51′39″E
- Construction started: October 1961
- Completed: 1963
- Cost: £1.5 million
- Owner: City of Perth

Height
- Roof: 49.8 m (163 ft)

Technical details
- Floor count: 13

Design and construction
- Architects: Jeffrey Howlett & Don Bailey
- Main contractor: J. Hawkins and Son

Western Australia Heritage Register
- Type: State Registered Place
- Designated: 8 December 2006
- Reference no.: 2097

Council House is a 13-storey office building on St Georges Terrace in Perth, Western Australia. Located beside Stirling Gardens and Government House in the city's central business district, the 49.8-metre (163 ft) building was designed by Howlett and Bailey Architects and opened by Queen Elizabeth II in 1963, after Perth hosted the 1962 British Empire and Commonwealth Games. For most of its history, it has served as the headquarters for the City of Perth.

Built in a modernist style, the building has been the subject of vigorous public debate about its heritage value. Some parties, such as the Royal Australian Institute of Architects, consider the building to be an important example of modernist architecture in the city, whilst others consider it ugly. These conflicting views led to animosity in the 1990s, when the State Government refused to heritage list the property, and instead recommended its demolition. Despite this, the City of Perth opted to renovate the tower and keep it as its headquarters. Following this, the building was admitted to the State's Heritage Register.

== Prior site history ==
The site was originally home to the colony's governing Legislative Council in a building which came to be known as the Old Government Offices or Public Offices. The building was designed by Acting Civil Engineer Henry Reveley in August 1836 after he was asked to prepare plans for public offices on the site. A call for tenders was made, and the tender accepted was for £1,833, equivalent to A$223,900 in 2022, well above the £1,200 maximum, equivalent to A$146,600 in 2022, specified in the call for tenders. Payment was delayed until February 1839.

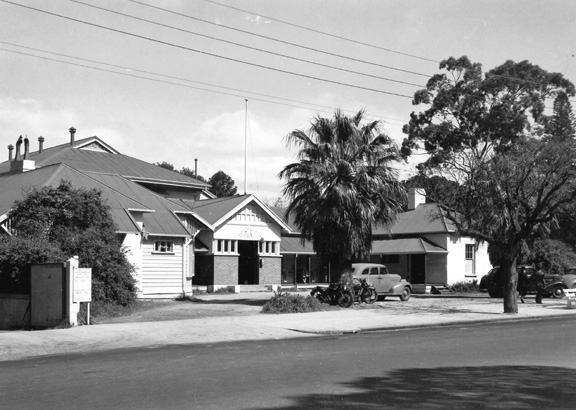
The old Public Offices which stood on the site

The Public Offices stood 10 metres (33 ft) back from St Georges Terrace. The Legislative Council occupied the building until 1870, when it moved to a chamber adjoining the new Perth Town Hall. The Legislative Council returned to the building in 1890 after the newly formed Legislative Assembly took over that chamber. In the 1890s, the building became a post office, before being taken over by the Department of Agriculture, and the building continued to be used as public offices until 1961. Additions to the building in the 1930s included a second storey, which contained a Legislative Council room and offices for senior public servants. Showing its age, the building eventually became what was described as a "rat-infested hell-hole".

The Perth City Council had been based from 1871 in the Perth Town Hall, then in 1925 moved to offices in Murray Street. The site of the Public Offices on St Georges Terrace was chosen as the site for a new home for the Perth City Council in 1954. Immediately south of the Public Offices building stood the Soldiers' Institute building. This building was taken over from the Returned Soldiers' League by the ABC in 1937 for its 6WF radio studio.

== Competition and construction ==
With the news that Perth would be hosting the 1962 British Empire and Commonwealth Games, Perth City Council launched an international competition in 1959 to design its new building. The brief in the competition was to design a "creative building that marked where Perth was at the time" and have the building ready in time for the opening of the Commonwealth Games.

Following the competition announcement, 184 architects registered, with 61 designs eventually entered into the competition, including one by Jeffrey Howlett and Don Bailey from the Melbourne architectural firm Bates, Smart and McCutcheon. The jury assessing the competition entries, which included architect Harry Seidler, described the Howlett-Bailey plan as "a remarkably simple solution to a complex problem" and declared them winners of the competition.

The ABC moved to new premises on Adelaide Terrace in 1960 when the Council House site was taken over by the Perth City Council for construction to begin. Both the Public Offices and Soldiers' Institute buildings were demolished to make way for the redevelopment.

Excavations for construction of the building's foundations started in October 1961 and the first concrete pour occurred in November 1961. The building was not completely finished by the time Perth hosted the Commonwealth Games in November 1962, however the builders rushed to finish the ground, eighth, and 10th floors in time so that foreign dignitaries could be entertained in the reception areas. Following the Games, the fit-out of the building was finished in March 1963, and on 25 March 1963 Queen Elizabeth II officially opened Council House, unveiling a 2.4-metre (7.9 ft) tall ceremonial plaque set in granite from the original 1817 Waterloo Bridge in London.

Construction of Council House was performed by J. Hawkins and Son Pty Ltd, and cost £A 1.5 million, equivalent to A$48.8 million in 2022. It was the first building in Perth to use complete window walling. In order to reduce the heat entering the building through these full-height windows, the building used internal blinds and external sun-breakers. When the building was opened, all Perth City Council activities were moved there.

Part of Howlett and Bailey's plans for the complex included the extension of Terrace Road westwards across the sites of the Old Court House and the Supreme Court, but this was never done. Also part of their plan was the construction of an elliptical auditorium called the Public Suite behind Council House; the plan to build this was dropped after the completion of Council House, with the design reformulated by Howlett and Bailey and the building eventually built on the opposite side of Government House as the Perth Concert Hall.

== 1990s refurbishment and heritage listing ==
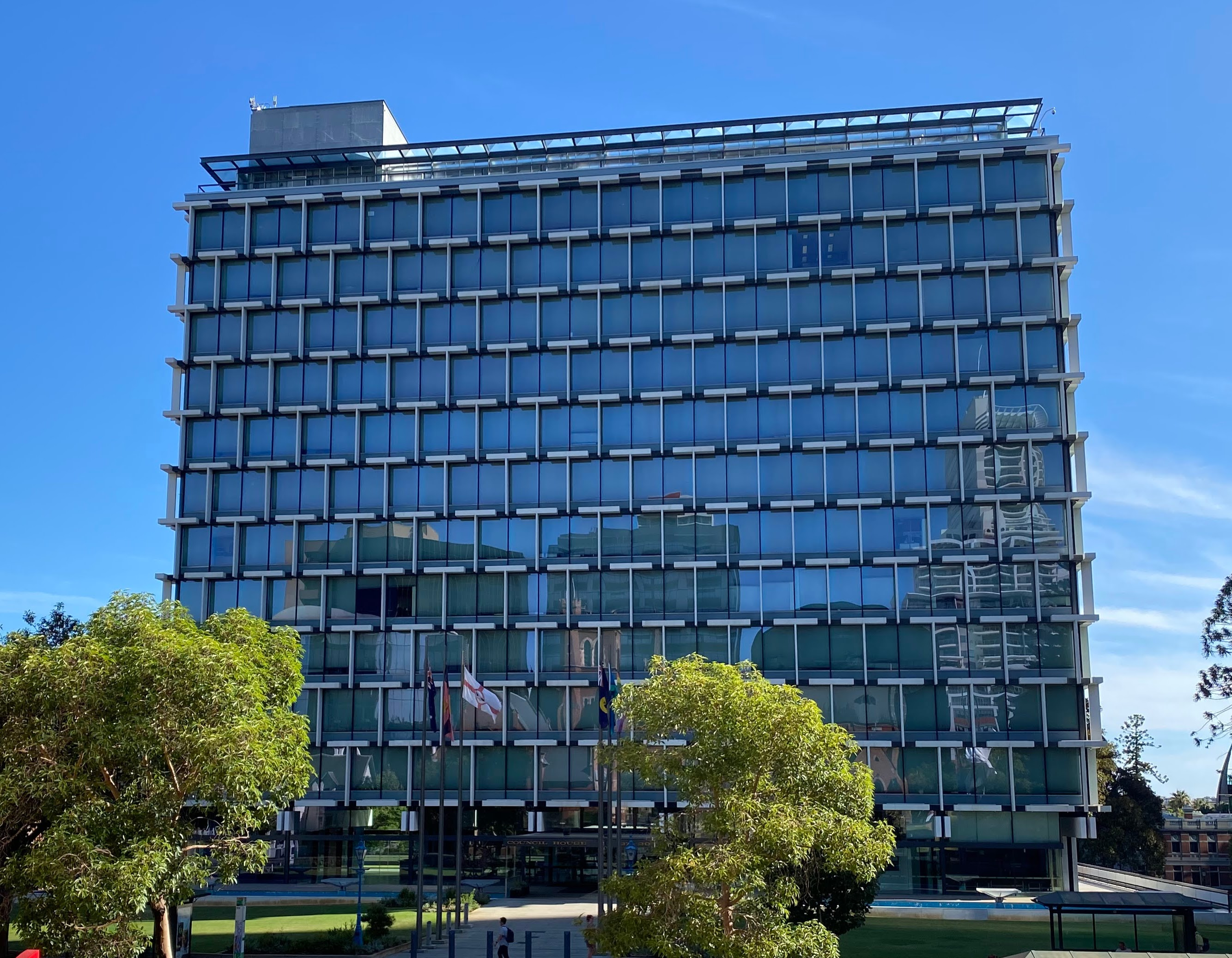
Council House in 2023, viewed from St Georges Terrace

The building continued to serve as the headquarters for the Perth City Council from its completion until 1994, when it was vacated to allow for the removal of asbestos which had been used to insulate the building's steel frame. The council moved to office space in the Westralia Square building.

In 1994, commissioners appointed by the state to oversee the break-up of the Perth City Council voted to demolish the building. At the time, refurbishment costs were estimated to run to A$42 million. The State Government's plan was to demolish the building and extend Stirling Gardens right across the site to beside Government House, as part of a broader plan entitled "Perth – A City for People" which also included the Northbridge Tunnel, the sinking of Riverside Drive, and the housing of Supreme Court and District Court under the one roof. The State Government suggested that the council move into the Old Treasury Building across St Georges Terrace, for which they offered an incentive of A$30 million.

Significant public debate ensued about whether the building should be kept. Those prominent in the fight to save the building included Bill Warnock, architect Ken Adam, and the Royal Australian Institute of Architects. Others said it was "out of date, unattractive, and out of step" with the older heritage buildings which surround it. Graham Kierath, the Minister for Heritage, also refused to place the building on the State Register of Heritage Places, despite calls from the Heritage Council and the National Trust to do so. This decision "stunned" the Institute of Architects.

Despite the recommendation for demolition, in late 1995, the councillors of the newly formed City of Perth had a feasibility study carried out into whether Council House could be refurbished. This feasibility study was carried out by Architects Cox Howlett and Bailey, of which one of the partners was the son of original designer Jeffrey Howlett, and cost $100,000. The study indicated that the building could be economically refurbished, and in December 1996 the council unanimously agreed to press ahead with refurbishment plans, removing its asbestos and building an underground car park at the rear of the site. The decision to refurbish was helped by the fact that interest rates at the time were so low that it was cheaper to service a loan than to pay rent. At the time, the refurbishment was expected to cost around A$26 million.

The new 95-bay car park at the rear of the building required the removal of a New Zealand kauri pine estimated to be up to 150 years old, and was described by John Cowdell, a Labor MLC, as a "disgrace" which would undermine the heritage value of the precinct. There was also some concern expressed that the refurbishment might cause the building to lose heritage value through the updating of its interiors.

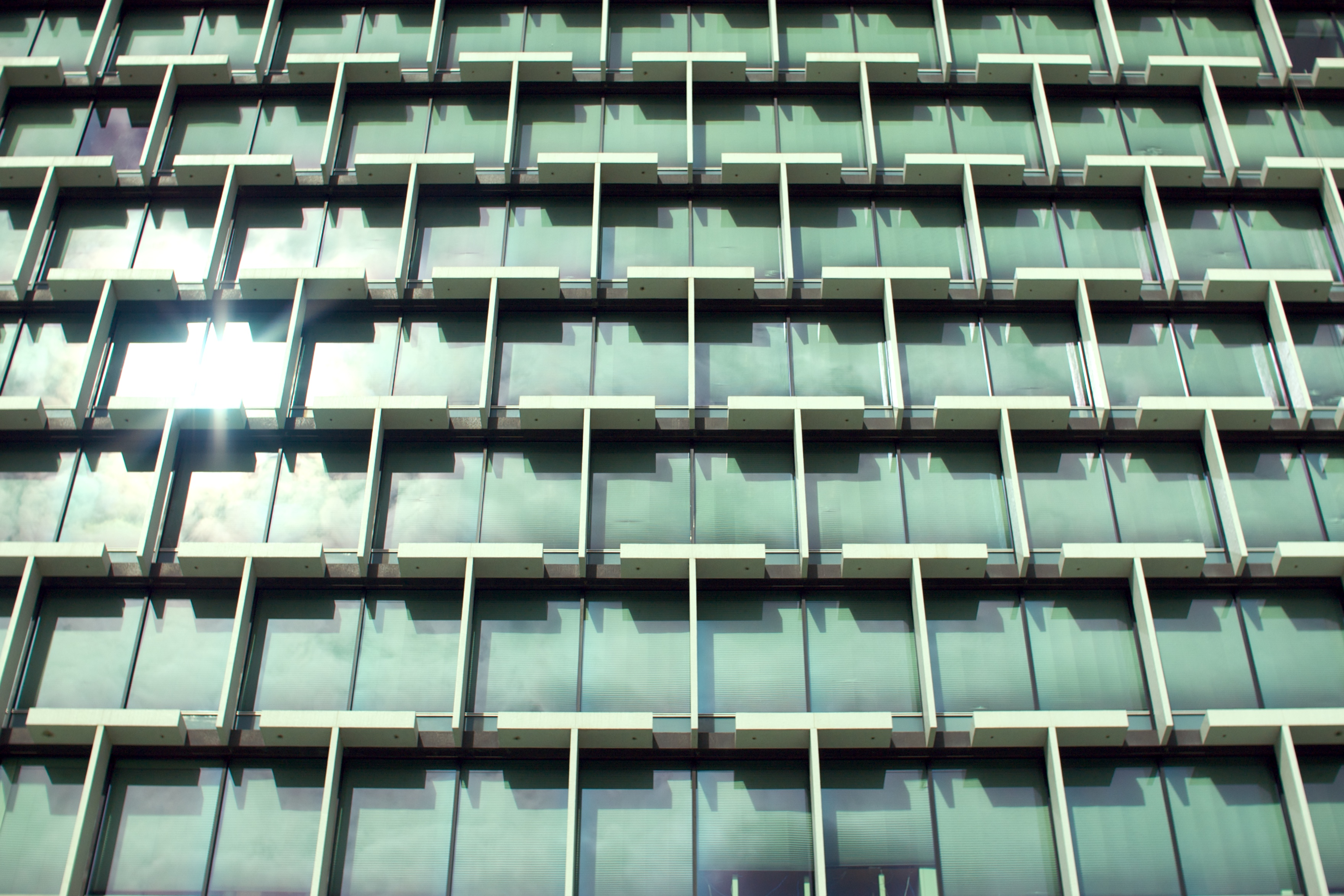
The building's distinctive sunbreakers were restored as part of the refurbishment.

The contract to refurbish the building was won by John Holland Group, the construction company of Janet Holmes à Court, on 29 July 1997, at a price of A$25.3 million. The architect for the refurbishment was Geoffrey Clough of Peter Hunt and Daryl Jackson Architects. The building was "stripped back to bare bones" and the tiny tiles coating the building's distinctive T-shaped fins were removed, repaired, and re-glued to the surface. The refurbishment also involved the construction of a new "Lord Mayoral space and reception area" on the eleventh floor (formerly a plant level), the full enclosure of the ground floor (which had previously been partially open to the elements) and the replacement of gold Venetian blinds which had been a feature of the building in the past.

The City of Perth moved back to Council House in February 1999 and placed three unused floors of Council House for lease. The refurbishment was widely considered a "qualified success", with the building "handsomely restored".

The 2001 state election resulted in a change of government, with the Labor Party returning to power. The restored building was finally placed on the interim heritage list by Heritage Minister Michelle Roberts on 5 March 2006. Former Heritage Minister Graham Kierath, who had resisted the nomination in the 1990s, attacked the decision to list the building as pandering to left-wing supporters. The Heritage Council of Western Australia recommended on 17 November 2006 that the listing of the building go ahead. The building was entered as a permanent entry on the Heritage Register on 8 December 2006, with John Hyde saying:

While the building is different from our traditional notion of heritage, Council House will be as important to future generations as many of our colonial buildings that are considered priceless to the community today.

— John Hyde

== Design and reaction ==
Council House is constructed from concrete-encased steel frame, with lifts and service rooms located at its eastern end and a fire escape stairwell at its western end. Level 9 houses the distinctive circular Council Chamber, which features wood panelling and has been restored to largely its original state in the 1990s refurbishment (by contrast to most of the other levels of the building). The building is almost completely clad with glass, which led to criticism about its excessive air conditioning costs. The glass exterior of the building has T-shaped white sunbreakers superimposed in an alternating pattern across the building, coated with fine mosaic tiles. With the newly enclosed top floor, the building now has 13 levels above ground.

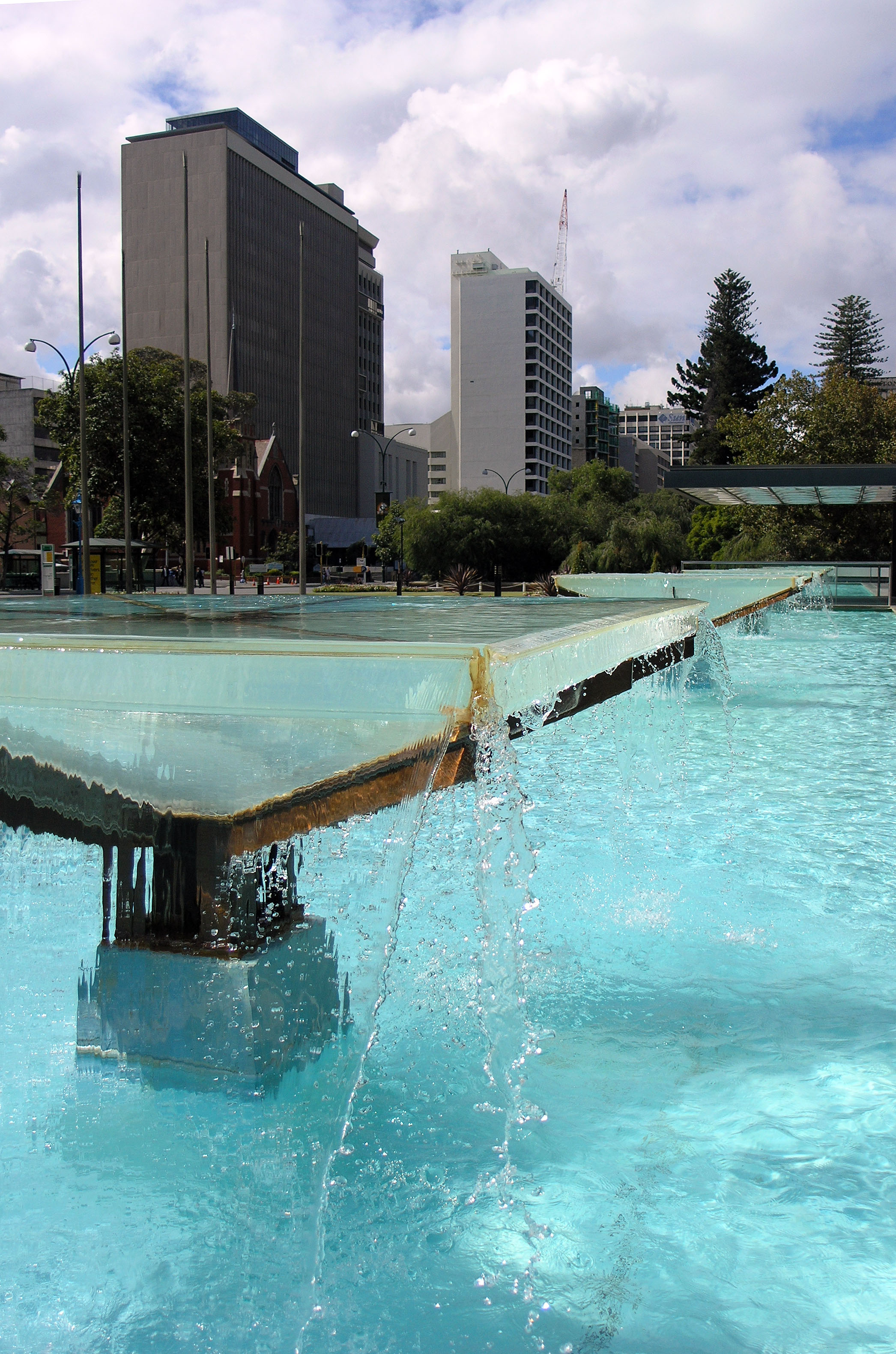
Ornamental fountains in the forecourt of the building, restored in the 1990s refurbishment

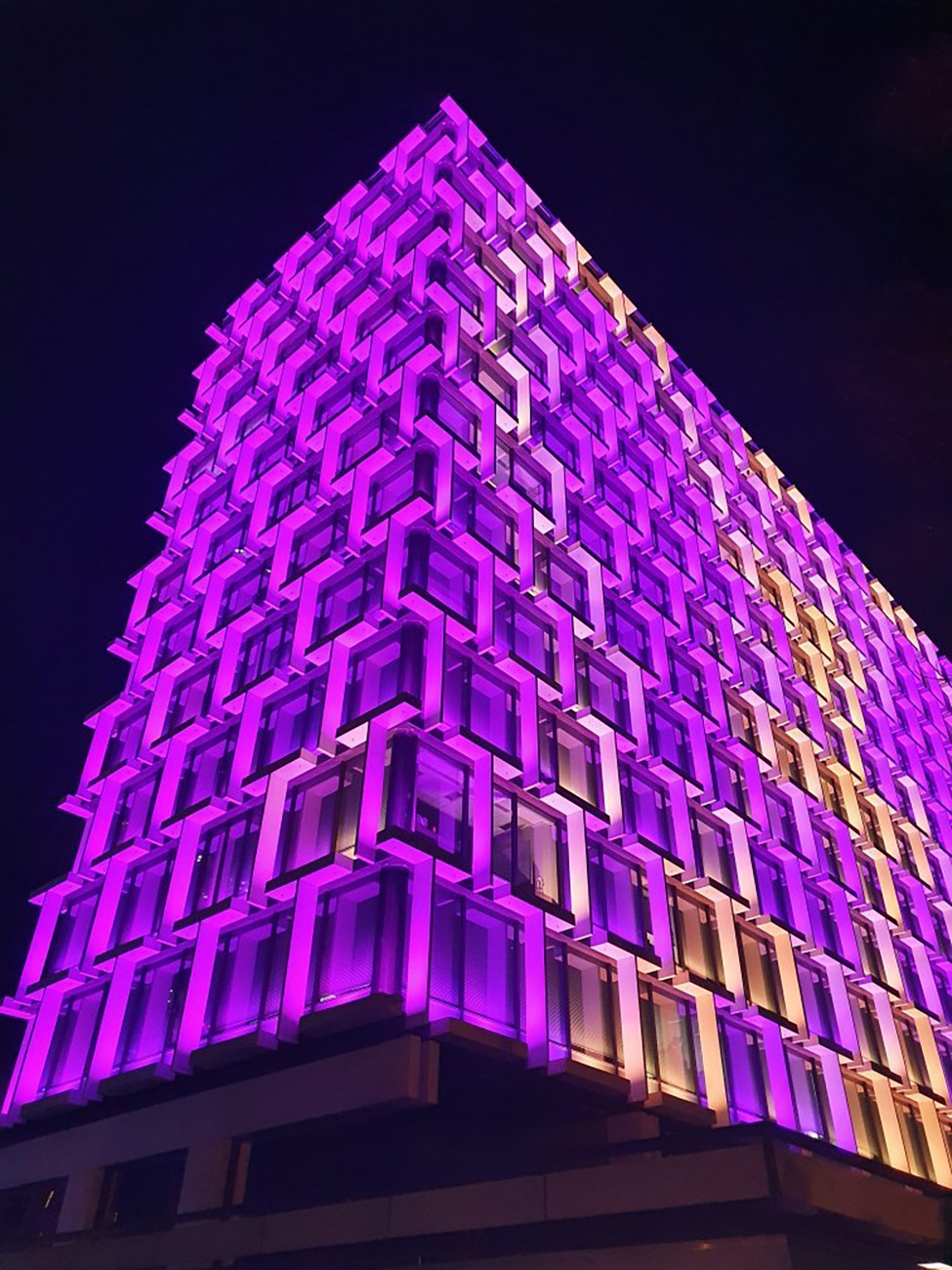
The building lit up for the Queen's Platinum Jubilee in 2022

The building, which was the favourite creation of its designer Jeffrey Howlett, has been called the most important example of modernist architecture in Perth and "one of the State's modernist icons". The building has been described as demonstrating "modernist aspirations" from the Bauhaus school, exuding "brutalist warmth". Stephen Neille, the Chair of Architectural Design at Curtin University, described it as reflecting Perth of that time: a city "brimming with confidence and consciously promoting itself to the world as a modern city". Adrian Iredale, from architects Iredale Pederson Hook, described the building as "simultaneously elegant and heavy and introducing poetry through the repetitive system of sun shading, the big Ts that hover in front of the facade on all sides."

The building has divided the public over the years, with some branding the building an "eyesore" and a "hideous folly", whereas others considered it a "classic example of 1960s architecture and an important reminder of Perth's past" and a "unique building". It has been suggested by Associate Ralph Hoare from the Australian Institute of Architects said the building should never have been built on St Georges Terrace, having been built in the "wrong place".

When it was built, it reflected this great optimism in WA, this was the sixties. I really think that's a superb building as it still mirrors the Perth of its time.

— Architect Dick Donaldson

=== LED lighting ===
The outside of the building was fitted with over 22,000 LED lights which was officially turned on on 7 April 2010. The LEDs located on the roof, 'T' window structures, and bulkheads are able to be individually computer controlled and coloured. The lights were installed at a cost of A$1.08 million.

=== Enduring Architecture Awards ===
In 2015 the significance of the building was acknowledged by the Australian Institute of Architects, initially winning the state based Enduring Architecture Award, later in the same year presented the National Award for Enduring Architecture.
