= Reserve Bank of Australia Building, Canberra =

Administrative building in Australia

Reserve Bank of Australia Building
- Reserve Bank of Australia building, 2025

- Location within Australian Capital Territory

General information
- Architectural style: Modernist
- Location: 20-22 London Circuit, City, Canberra, Australian Capital Territory, Australia
- Coordinates: 35.2804°S 149.1270°E
- Construction started: 1965
- Completed: 1967
- Renovated: 1983, 1988, 1994
- Cost: £307,353
- Owner: Reserve Bank of Australia

Technical details
- Material: Marble, timber, glass, concrete

Design and construction
- Architecture firm: Howlett and Bailey
- Other designers: Margo Lewers (sculpture); Donald Brook (sculpture)
- Main contractor: Civil & Civic

Commonwealth Heritage List
- Official name: Reserve Bank of Australia
- Type: Listed place (Historic)
- Criteria: A., D., E., and F.
- Designated: 22 June 2004
- Reference no.: 105396

The Reserve Bank of Australia Building is a heritage-listed bank building at 20-22 London Circuit, City, Canberra, Australian Capital Territory, Australia. It was designed by Howlett and Bailey in 1962 and built from 1963 to 1965 by Civil & Civic. It was added to the Australian Commonwealth Heritage List on 22 June 2004.

== History ==
On 13 January 1913 the Savings Bank Department of the Commonwealth Bank opened for business in Canberra. A week later the Savings Bank Department and General Banking commenced operations. Both departments occupied a room in the Administrative Offices in Acton. In October 1913, the Commonwealth Bank moved into its own premises, erected by the Department of Home Affairs, in Acton. In June 1925 the Chairman of the Federal Capital Commission raised the question of permanent premises for the Commonwealth Bank in Canberra. The proposal received a positive response from the Commonwealth Bank Board in July 1925 and the Deputy Governor visited Canberra to consider suitable sites. In April 1926, the Commonwealth Bank acquired the lease for the site on the western side of Northbourne Avenue and the corner of City Circuit (now London Circuit) for £5,600. Each leaseholder had to erect a building in accordance with the design of the Federal Capital Commission. Tenders for the Commonwealth Bank's new premises closed in November 1926 with Simmie and Co being the successful contractor at £11,326. The Commonwealth Bank moved into its new premises (part of the Melbourne Building) in October 1927.

When the Reserve Bank of Australia separated from the Commonwealth Bank, it continued to occupy space on the first floor of the Commonwealth Bank premises. The working conditions were very cramped and the Reserve Bank, almost immediately, began negotiations with the National Capital Development Commission (NCDC) to find a suitable site for its own premises. The NCDC at first offered the Reserve Bank a site on the south western side of Northbourne Avenue and London Circuit but later withdrew this offer because of perceived traffic problems. The NCDC then offered the Reserve Bank a site on London Circuit near the intersection with University Avenue. This site was opposite a proposed commercial precinct and was an integral part of a legal precinct. The Reserve Bank agreed to accept the site in May 1961 and applied for a 99 year lease, commencing on 1 May 1962 at a rental of 5% of the unimproved capital value of the land. The lease was subject to review every 20 years. Although the NCDC would not permit an architectural competition for the corner site on Northbourne Avenue, there was no objection to a competition for the legal precinct site, notwithstanding the fact that NCDC imposed height and bulk conditions in the lease.

The Canberra Branch of the Reserve Bank is the result of an architectural competition, approved by the Royal Australian Institute of Architects (RAIA). The National Capital Development Commission (NCDC) managed the competition to the requirements of the Reserve Bank. The competition was advertised on 13 December 1961 and closed on 16 April 1962. It required a building to front London Circuit, but with all elevations of equal importance. Other design and siting requirements included the building having: a ground floor and two upper floors with the height not to exceed RL 1902; a copper roof; all plant contained within the building; air conditioning and heating using smokeless fuel; suitable landscaping; no underground accommodation. The Reserve Bank required the following accommodation: a banking chamber on the ground floor with a one-metre-wide (four-foot) and up to 24-metre-long (80 ft) counter; working space of 190 square metres (2,000 sq ft), and a 5-metre-wide (16 ft) public space the full length of the counter. The manager's room was to be 23 square metres (250 sq ft) and the assistant manager's room 19 square metres (200 sq ft). Also required was a cash handling area of 330 square metres (3,500 sq ft) and a strong room with walls, floor and roof 0.76 metres (2 ft 6 in) thick. The climatic conditions of Canberra required special attention and the total cost was not to exceed £250,000.

There were 131 submissions from 248 registrations, and the assessors: Professor Ingham Ashworth, (Sydney); Professor R A Jensen (Adelaide); and Mr Grenfell Ruddick (NCDC Associate Commissioner) reported that the response was "extremely disappointing" with the majority of the schemes lacking "architectural distinction". Another complaint was that the schemes were "totally unsuited for the site in question". The assessors report noted that "the most successful schemes were those based on a simple rectangular form". The winning architects were Howlett and Bailey of Perth. Tenders for construction eventually closed in July 1963 with the successful tenderers being Civil & Civic with a quotation of £307,353, some £50,000 more than the competition limit. Construction was commenced in 1963 and completed in 1965.

The artwork in the banking chamber was initially sculpted by Margo Lewers in 1965 to a design by Gerald Lewers. This work was originally untitled but has since been referred to as "Four Pieces". Cast in copper, it occupies the major part of the wall, high on the southern side of the banking chamber. Another major sculpture was a free standing aluminium and fibreglass figure by Donald Brook, also "Untitled". This was installed in 1965 in the roof garden but was removed when the atrium was converted to office accommodation and now resides with the Canberra Museum and Art Gallery.

Throughout the life of the building changes have been made to the structure and fabric of the building and services upgrading has occurred as technological change exerted its influence. Maintenance work occurred in 1972, 1977 and in 1978 the telephone, lighting and electrical services were upgraded. The Department of Works made internal alterations and additions in September 1978 and replaced the external mosaic tiles with marble cladding in April 1981. The Department of Transport and Construction supervised a major refurbishment for the building in 1983 including redesign of the ground and first floor in January 1983, a refurbishment of the entrance canopies in February 1983, upgraded ground and first floor toilets in May 1983, and new mechanical services in August 1983. In October 1988, the Department of Housing and Construction designed a roof replacement and internal refurbishment. The principal result of all these alterations and additions was the infilling of the atrium to provide additional accommodation and the redesign of the cash handling area as that function changed. Further alterations occurred in 1994 to convert surplus accommodation for letting to tenants. This work included refurbishment of the independent entrance on the northern side of the building with a granite floor, a marble, granite and stainless steel stair, a skylight over, and the partitioning of the first floor space into offices. Alterations to the buildings in recent years illustrate a change towards a cashless society.

The original building design reflects the money-handling nature of banking in a cash-oriented society. The design of the Reserve Bank and its operation centred on the receipt and distribution of cash. The careful arrangements for receiving cash in a secure cash handling area, the location of the strong room in the centre of the building, the bold, wide (but carefully uncluttered) public counter together with the scale and overwhelming impressiveness of the banking chamber were all meant to give a real sense of security as well as provide a perception of the significance and importance of the role of the Reserve Bank in the Australian banking system.

The Reserve Bank building was the second building after the Law Courts of the ACT to be constructed in the legal precinct near the intersection of University Avenue and London Circuit. The third and last building making up the civic design group that terminated University Avenue was the Federal Police Headquarters. The design of the precinct reflects the important civic design principles being implemented by the National Capital Development Commission and the way in which these can be achieved by offering suitable sites to public institutions. The civic design status of University Avenue as one of Canberra's major axes terminating at Civic Hill had been established with the construction of buildings such as the ANZ Bank building in the Hobart Place commercial precinct.

== Description ==
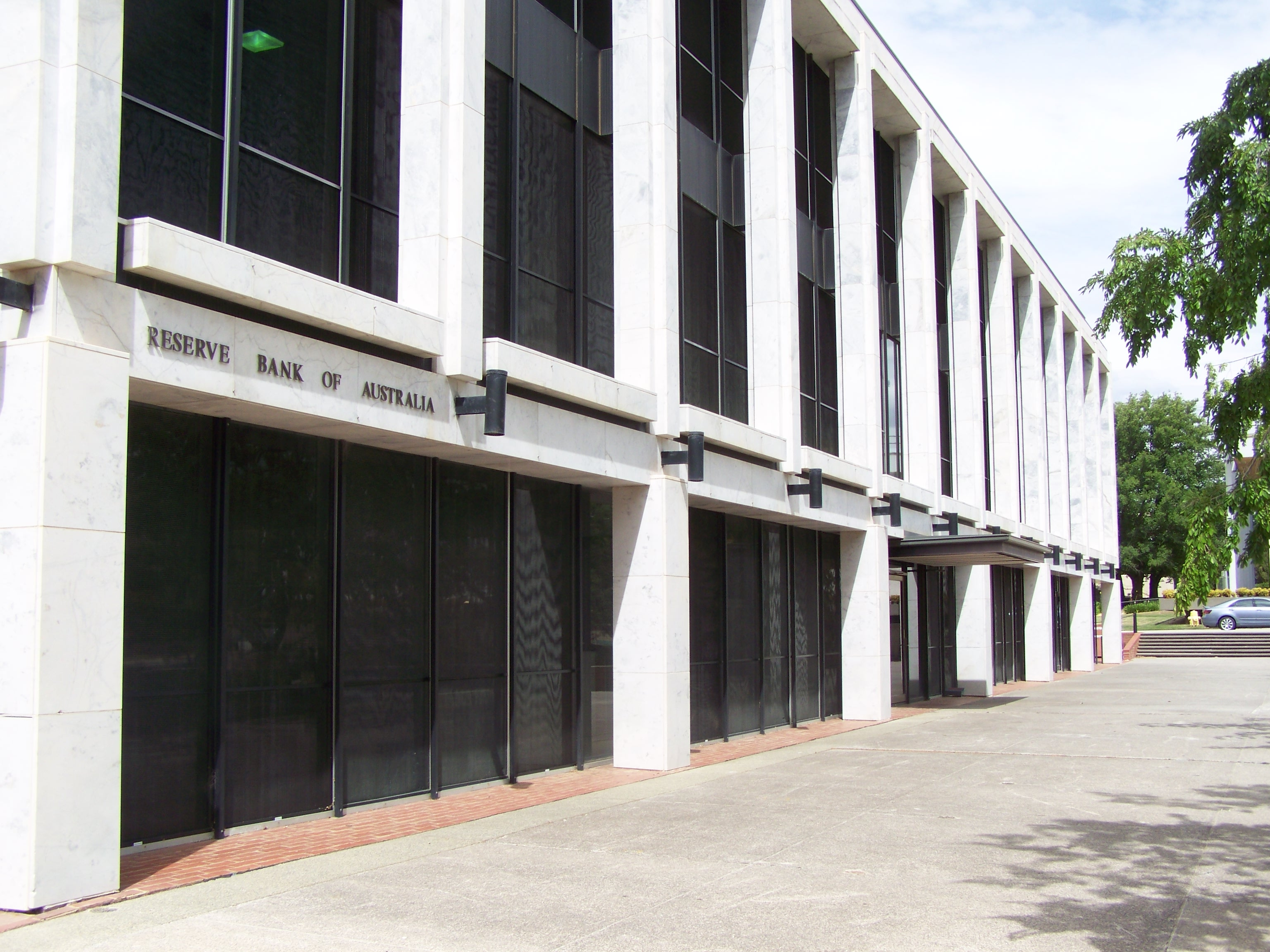
View of the building with signange, 2009

The Reserve Bank of Australia building is at 20-22 London Circuit, Canberra.

The Reserve Bank is a structure built of enduring materials in a prestigious precinct. The building is a low scale example of modernist architecture.

The architectural qualities of the design rely on the lightness of the structure, the regular structural pattern, the contrast between the marble-faced columns and beams and the glazing. The attention to detail is precise and is expressed in the way the vertical and horizontal structural elements connect and the subtle spacing of the structure from the glazed curtain wall accommodation box behind. The articulated structure, regular elevation pattern and the minimal visual impact of the roof are typical features of the modernist functional style. The vertical emphasis of the columns extending over two levels to give the low rise building a sense of height is most effective. The columns are cruciform in plan and support a beam carefully separated from the column. The glazed curtain wall is supported on the beam and uses aluminium mullions. The very strong, blank wall of the secure ground floor cash handling area on the external south eastern side of the building is another powerful reminder of its modernist qualities where the internal function gains external expression.

Internally the most important space is the banking chamber. It is a symmetrical design with a central entrance under a canopy with black slate entrance floor, converting into carpet once inside the room. The carpet is not the original fabric. In the south eastern corner of the banking chamber there is a glazed entrance to offices through a timber and georgian wired glass partition with the door matching the partition design. In the centre of the eastern wall there is an entrance to the strong room. From the public side, the folded and wrapped copper abstract Gerald Lewers sculpture "Untitled" ('Four Pieces') and the matt black ribbed wall on which it is fixed dominate the room. Another noticeable feature is the banking counter, a most handsome piece of furniture with a laminated timber front and a marble top, sitting on dowel metal legs. The interior is light and airy as a result of the full height glazing on three sides of the room. The glazing has had to be screened because of the effect of sunlight. The ceiling is coffered and the wall under the sculpture is marble-faced. The banking chamber is a most important space and its historic fabric and built in furniture described contribute to its significance.

The strong room is entered through a glass sliding door from the banking chamber. The strong room door is by John Tam (Australia) and has an anchor motif. The space is divided into areas by metal grills, the floor is parquet. The strong room is important for the way it is designed as the hub of the building and for its significant fabric and form of design reflecting the cash handling nature of the way society and banking operated at the time.

The courtyard onto which the three buildings face had been constructed as a setting for the Law Courts and at the time of the opening of the Reserve Bank the Federal Police Headquarters were under construction.

The design and siting controls of the NCDC meant that the Reserve Bank would fit comfortably in scale with the existing Law Courts and the use of marble facing and flat roof profile created a sympathetic physical connection between the precinct elements. The Law Courts building with its black columns and white marble walls was almost a negative of the dark curtain wall and white marble columns of the Reserve Bank. The marble cladding has replaced original mosaic tiles. The courtyard materials with pre-cast light grey exposed aggregate paving and black slate rectangles reinforced the "colour coded" nature of the precinct.

=== Condition ===
The building design has been modified by the addition of sunscreens to the exposed glass areas, which has reduced the intended transparency of the banking chamber. The mosaic tiling has been replaced by marble cladding.

== Heritage listing ==
The Reserve Bank of Australia building was listed on the Australian Commonwealth Heritage List on 22 June 2004 having satisfied the following criteria.

Criterion A: Processes

The Reserve Bank is important as the nation's central bank having evolved from the separation of the central banking (monetary policy) function from the commercial, customer focussed activities of the Commonwealth Bank.

Criterion D: Characteristic values

It is one of three buildings in the precinct, demonstrating the Stripped Classical style of architecture with their typical features such as simple rectangular forms, echoes of colonnades, symmetry and horizontal skyline, all linked by a landscape plaza also expressing a geometric minimalist style. The sculptural work in the Reserve Bank, by Gerald and Margo Lewers demonstrates the sculptural styles of the times and the role of art to adorn public places.

Criterion E: Aesthetic characteristics

The aesthetic importance of the Reserve Bank building which links harmoniously with the precinct, is created by the elegance of its minimalist design style, the low scale and simple building form, and the use of pale grey marble cladding which provides a light visual quality. The location of the bank in the precinct, being visual subservient to the former Law Courts building, enhances the latter's projection of authority and dignity. The Reserve Bank contributes enframement to visual axis of the Black Mountain vista.

Criterion F: Technical achievement

The Reserve Bank of Australia building, constructed 1963 -65, is a major component of the Law Courts Precinct. The precinct provides a noteworthy contribution to Canberra's townscape by its siting as a terminating point for University Avenue at City Hill, its arrangement of buildings giving prominence to the Supreme Court, and its design execution in the contemporary modern design idiom.

The design of the Reserve Bank is additionally important for its overall impression of institutional security. The impressive space of its banking chamber makes full use of the building's height and proportions. Design features of the chamber are the sculpture, "Four Pieces" by Gerald and Margo Lewers, and the timber counter and furniture contemporary with the design of the building.

== See also ==
- Reserve Bank of Australia Building, Sydney
