= 1979 Australia Day Honours =

The 1979 Australia Day Honours were announced on 26 January 1979 by the Governor General of Australia, Sir Zelman Cowen.

The Australia Day Honours are the first of the two major annual honours lists, announced on Australia Day (26 January), with the other being the Queen's Birthday Honours which are announced on the second Monday in June.

== Order of Australia ==
Order of Australia (Civil) ribbon

Order of Australia (Military) ribbon

=== Companion of the Order of Australia (AC) ===
Recipient	Citation	Notes
Bob Hawke	For service to trade unionism and industrial relations.	
Sir Laurence Rupert McIntyre CBE	For public service.	
The Honourable John Brophy Renshaw	For service to politics and management.	
Sir Walter Scott	For service to industry and government.	
Sir Frederick Wheeler CBE	For public service.	

=== Officer of the Order of Australia (AO) ===
==== General Division ====
Recipient	Citation	Notes
The Honourable Lance Herbert Barnard	For service to politics and government.	
The Honourable Kim Edward Beazley	For service to politics and government.	
Lewis Harold Border MVO	For public service.	
Arthur Meric Bloomfield Boyd	For service to the visual arts.	
Lester Joseph Brain AFC	For service to the aviation industry.	
Dr Peter Braithwaite CBE, ED	For community service, particularly with the Australian Red Cross Society.	
Cleaver Ernest Bunton OBE	For service to local government.	
James Allen Crawford	For community service.	
The Honourable John Patrick Ducker	For service to trade unionism.	
Professor Donald William George	For service in the fields of science and engineering.	
The Most Reverend James William Gleeson CMG	For service to religion and social welfare.	
Dr Phyllis Marion Elliott Goatcatcher	For community service.	
Leslie Kenneth Gordon	For public service.	
Albert Edward Harris	For service to industry.	
Cyril Nathaniel Kleinig	For service to the aviation industry.	
David Surrey Gibson Littlemore	For service to architecture.	
John Osman Miller	For community service.	
Roger Neil Morse	For public service.	
Norman Richard Seddon CBE	For services to the performing arts.	
Egon Stern	For services to the development of air navigational facilities.	
The Honourable Frank Joseph Scott Wise	For service to politics and government.	

==== Military Division ====
Branch	Recipient	Citation	Notes
Navy	Commodore Ivan Raoul Jones	For service as Director-General of Fleet Maintenance.	
Army	Brigadier Roy Wilfred Morris	For service to the Australian Army and in particular as Director-General of Supply.	
Army	Major General John Irvine Williamson OBE	For service in positions of great responsibility including that of Deputy Chief of the General Staff.	
Air Force	Air Commodore Jeffrey Hubert De La Tour Blackwell	For service to the Royal Australian Air Force and in particular as Director-General of Personnel Services.	
Air Force	Air Commodore Robert David Egerton	For service to the Royal Australian Air Force and in particular as Director-General of Supply.	

=== Member of the Order of Australia (AM) ===
==== General Division ====
Recipient	Citation	Notes
Betty Joan Allen	For service to the Girl's Brigade Australia.	
Rabbi Raymond Apple	For service to the Jewish community.	
Professor George William Bassett	For service to education.	
Edwin Charles Benness	For service to industry and the community.	
Dr Edward Allan Booth	For service to medicine, particularly in the field of radiology.	
Colonel Henry Noel Boyle	For service to the welfare of service men and women, particularly as Chairman of the Regular Defence Force Welfare Association.	
Anthony Bookman	For service to the Adelaide Children's Hospital	
Thomas Napier Brown	For service to the furniture industry.	
John Keith Buchanan JP	For community service.	
Joy Collins	For community service.	
Allan George Coombs	For service to the building industry and to education.	
George Henry Dallimore JP	For service to pharmacy	
Dr William Gardner Davies	For public service, particularly as a member of the Australian Delegation to UNESCO	
Paul Louis Dubois	For public service with the Australian Telecommunications Commission.	
John Isadore Einfeld	For service to the community and to the welfare of ex-servicemen and women.	
Dr Archie Samuel Ellis	For service in the field of mental health, particularly as Director of Mental Health Services in Western Australia.	
Dr Kenneth Duncan Fitch	For service in the field of sports medicine.	
Victor McDonald Gibson	For service to industry.	
Lindsay Gaye Goggin	For service to the sport of golf.	
Emeritus Professor Douglas Gordon	For service to medicine and medical research, particularly in the field of preventative medicine.	
Rhoda Joyce Evelyn Gray	For service to nursing and community welfare.	
James Merewyn Greenwood	For service to industry.	
Allan Thomas Griffith	For public service.	
John Dennis Harris	For community service.	
Dr Morton Earle Herman	For service to architecture.	
Henry Francis Critchely Hinder	For service to art.	
Margel Ina Harris Hinder	For service to art.	
Dr Tulloch Graham Heuze Hogg	For service to handicapped children.	
Emeritus Professor Colin James Horne	For service to literature.	
Stanley Ernest Huddleston	For public service.	
Peter John Hudson	For service to the sport of Australian Rules Football.	
Beryl Elaine Jacka MBE	For service to the mining industry.	
Dr Henry Buckhurst Kay	For service to medicine and to the National Heart Foundation of Australia.	
David Anthony Kearney	For community service.	
Nancy Florence Keesing	For service to literature.	
Sidney Joseph Albert Kemp	For service to country radio and television.	
Breno Edwin Lange	For service to local government and the community.	
Professor Noel Desmond Martin	For service to dentistry.	
Kelvin Paul McGrath	For service to forestry and conservation.	
Heather Pamela McKay MBE	For service to the sport of squash.	
Desmond Joseph Mooney	For service in the field of mental health.	
Deaconess Frances Jean Northrop	For service to Aboriginal welfare.	
Dr Desmond John Pittar	For service to medicine, particularly in the field of pathology.	
Clement William Bailey Renouf	For community service.	
Milton William Robinson	For public service.	
Kenneth Robert Rosewall MBE	For service to the sport of tennis.	
Kathleen Steele Scott	For public service with the Australian Postal Commission.	
Francis Arthur Sedgman	For service to the sport of tennis.	
Robert Michael Seymour DFC	For public service.	
Eric Abraham Silbert	For community service.	
Milton Graham Stevens	For public service with the Australian Postal Commission.	
James Thomas Davy Stewart MC	For service to the welfare of ex-service men and women.	
Alderman Douglas William Sutherland	For service to local government.	
John James Thornton RD	For community service.	
Margaret Trask	For service to librarianship.	
The Reverend Clarence Samuel Trudgian MBE	For service in the field of community welfare.	
Professor William George Walker	For service in the fields of university administration and learning.	
Dr Annie Winifred Wall	For service to the community, particularly in the field of women's affairs.	
Joseph Dudley Westwood OBE, MC	For service to the welfare of ex-service men and women	
Edgar Walwyn Wortley JP	For community service.	

==== Military Division ====
Branch	Recipient	Citation	Notes
Navy	Captain Ronald Rex Calder RAN	For service to the Royal Australian Navy and in particular as Director of Naval Weapons Design.	
Navy	Captain Malcolm Aidan McKinnon Clarke RAN	For service to the Royal Australian Navy and in particular as Inspector of Administration.	
Navy	Commander Patrick John Clough RAN	For service as Officer-in-charge of the Marine Engineering School.	
Army	Lieutenant Colonel Murray Phillip Blake MC	For service as Commanding Officer of 5/9 Battalion, the Royal Australian Regiment.	
Army	Lieutenant Colonel Phillip Roy Carey ED	For service to the Royal New South Wales Regiment and to the Army Reserve.	
Army	Lieutenant Colonel Paul Netherton Greenhalgh	For service to the Australian Army and as Assistant Army Attaché to the United States.	
Army	Lieutenant Colonel John Cameron Harding	For service to the Australian Army and to the Royal Military College, Duntroon.	
Army	Lieutenant Colonel Brian William Howard MC	For service as Commanding Officer of 3rd Battalion, Royal Australian Regiment.	
Army	Lieutenant Colonel Barrington George William Ingram ED	For service to the Australian Army Reserve.	
Army	Colonel Herbert Malcolm Lander	For service to the Australian Army and in particular as Director of Personnel Employment.	
Air Force	Group Captain Kevin Thomas Casey	For service as an Equipment Officer in the Royal Australian Air Force.	
Air Force	Wing Commander Robert William Fretwell	For service as a Radio Officer in the Royal Australian Air Force.	
Air Force	Group Captain Robert George Sharp	For service to Dentistry in the Royal Australian Air Force.	

=== Medal of the Order of Australia (OAM) ===
==== General Division ====
Recipient	Citation	Notes
Reverend Father Henry George Aerts	For service to ethnic communities.	
Yvette Fay Amber	For community service.	
Peter Marcus Anderson	For service to the welfare of ex-service men and women.	
Lilian Askew	For community service.	
Ethel May Bain	For community service.	
Gordon Charles Baker	For community service.	
Shirley Enid Ball	For community service.	
Grace Mary Baker	For community service.	
Kathleen Frances Bateman	For service to youth welfare.	
Betty Margaret Blattman	For public service.	
Harold William Boulton	For service to the Victorian Football Association.	
Daphne Jean Bowman	For service to youth welfare.	
Marcus Temple Brodribb	For community service.	
John Austin Chapman	For community service in the field of sport.	
Ernest Alfred Chittock	For community service.	
David James Clark	For service to the community, particularly the Brighton Primary School.	
Joan Roma Connell	For public service.	
Kathleen Cunningham	For community service.	
Sylvia Joyce Cupples	For community service, particularly in the development of school libraries.	
Eileen Beatrice Daer	For service to nursing.	
Bernard George D'Arcy	For community service.	
Claire Southwell Davis	For public and community service.	
Hugh St. Omer Dentry	For service to industry and to community.	
Dr Thomas Hewson Donnelly	For service to medical administration.	
Raymond Robert Duff	For service to local government.	
Gordon Llewellyn Duffield	For service to the accountancy profession and to the community.	
Pastor Clemence Victor Eckerman	For service to Aboriginal welfare.	
John Joseph Bronte Edwards OBE, MC	For service to local government and to the community.	
Purki Edwards	For service to nursing and to Aboriginal welfare.	
Veronica Beryl Ferris	For community service.	
John Torrens Flynn	For public service.	
Alderman Andrew James Frame	For community service.	
William Alexander Furey	For service to the sport of surf life saving.	
Dulcie Louisa Fyle	For service to the mentally handicapped.	
Winifred Helen George	For service to music.	
John Barry Gilmour	For service to the sport of athletics.	
Robert Richard William Gould	For public service.	
Norman Sydney Gray	For community service.	
Lawrence Gibson Grope	For community service.	
Maxine Constance Grope	For community service.	
Kenneth Grave Haines	For service to education and youth welfare.	
Ernest Edgar Hambley	For service to industry and the community.	
Thomas Nobes Herrman	For services to swimming and diving.	
Jean Katherine Hogan	For community service.	
Henry Vivian Holloway	For service to the sport of tennis.	
Councillor William Birchall Hunter	For community service.	
Milton Jenkins	For public service.	
Lilian Winifred Johns	For public service, particularly as Postmistress at Old Toongabbie.	
Constantine Karangers	For service to ethnic communities.	
George Trotter Lamb	For community service, particularly with the Australian Inland Mission.	
Leeta Coleman Lawrence	For public service.	
Maxwell Gilbert Lumsden	For community service.	
Colina Kinloch Lynham	For community service, particularly with the Young Women's Christian Association.	
Alderman Henry Lionel Maley	For service to local government and the community.	
Leah Janet Merchant	For community service.	
Reverend Alexander Johnstone Wilson McAlister	For service to the welfare of members of the Defence Force.	
Ann McGarry	For service to music.	
Melville James McInnes	For service to sport of cricket.	
Augusto Merzi	For service to music and entertainment.	
Andrew Gilbert Millar	For service to the welfare of ex-service men and to the community.	
Francis Charles Rex Mitchell	For service to local government and the community.	
Hubert Vincent Morris	For service with the Guide Dogs for the Blind Association of Queensland.	
Albert Nixon	For service to the development of primary industry in the Northern Territory.	
Edwin Joseph Okely	For service to the welfare of ex-service men and women.	
Raymond Donald Orr JP	For service to the community, particularly in the provision of fire-fighting services.	
John Bucknill Owen	For community service.	
Gayner Wilton Parker	For public service.	
Ethel Rose Pearce	For community service	
Lilian Blanche Pennycuick	For public service, particularly as Postmistress at Melton Mowbray	
Renzo Piroli	For service to ethnic communities.	
William Henry Pitt	For public service.	
Charles Herbert Rae	For service to the community, particularly in the provision of hospital facilities.	
Lilian Mavis Ramsay	For public service.	
Nellie Durie Scott	For services to nursing and the community.	
Cecil Thomas Shannon	For community service.	
Cedrick Richard Ewan Southwell	For service to local government and the community.	
Laurence Edward Stepto	For service to the sport of rowing.	
Dr Robert King Stevenson	For community service.	
Ralph Alfred Stone	For service to handicapped children.	
Clarence Frederick Stronetter	For community service	
Margaret Ruby (Nancy) Sturges	For community service	
William Sutherland	For community service	
Joyce Clare Swan	For community service	
William Alexander Goodall Swan	For service to country cricket.	
Roger Ivan Textor	For public and community service.	
Jean Blanche Tucker	For service to the Girl Guides Association of Australia.	
Elinor Ulin	For community service.	
John Thomas Vockler	For service to the welfare of ex service men and women.	
Marjorie Florence Jane Wilson	For service to animal welfare, particularly in the protection of Kangaroos	
William Gerard Wilson	For service to the community, particularly as a volunteer fire officer.	
Elwyn Anthony Wride	For community service.	
Hans Edwards Wright	For service to the sport of archery.	
James Yates	For service to education.	
Ernest Shapland Yeo	For service to the mentally handicapped.	

==== Military Division ====
Branch	Recipient	Citation	Notes
Navy	Warrant Officer Henri Wilhelm Blad	For service as Flight Deck Electrical Warrant Officer of HMAS Melbourne	
Navy	Chief Petty Officer Gordon Stubbs	For service to the main Naval store at the Royal Australian Naval Air Station, Nowra.	
Army	Warrant Officer Class Two James Harold Breeze	For service to the Army Reserve.	
Army	Warrant Officer Class One Neil Ronald Eiby	For service to 6th Battalion, Royal Australian Regiment.	
Army	Warrant Officer Class One Maxwell Roy Steiger	For service to the Australian Army and to the School of Army Health.	
Army	Warrant Officer Class One Peter Edward Wilkin	For service to the Australian Army as a Supervisor, Construction and Maintenance.	
Army	Warrant Officer Class One Colin James Williamson	For service to the Royal Australian Electrical and Mechanical Engineers Training Centre.	
Air Force	Warrant Officer Johannes Ronald Brook-Rerecich	For service as an Instrument Fitter at the Aircraft Research and Development Unit.	
Air Force	Warrant Officer Robert Keith Davidson BEM	For service as an Engineer at Number 3 Aircraft Depot, Amberley, Queensland.	
Air Force	Warrant Officer Robert Francis Lavin	For service in Equipment Accounting Duties with the Royal Australian Air Force.	
Air Force	Warrant Officer Brian Harold Stanley Mayfield	For service in Administrative Duties with the Royal Australian Air Force.	
