= Undergrowth (magazine) =

Literary and art journal

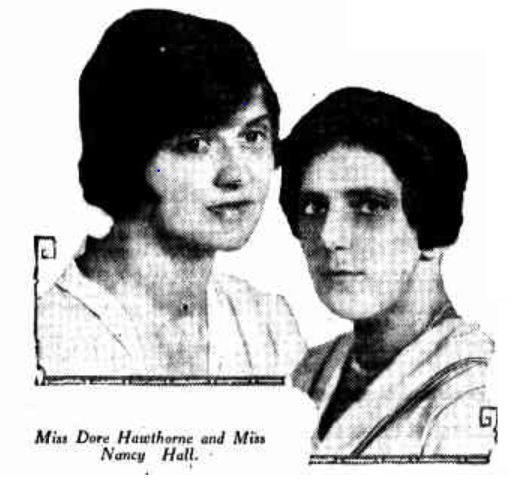
- Editor: Dore Hawthorne and Nancy A. Hall
- Categories: Art, Modernism
- Frequency: Bi-monthly
- Founded: 1924
- First issue: August 1924
- Country: Australia
- Based in: Sydney

Undergrowth magazine (Undergrowth: a magazine of youth and ideals) was a Sydney-based modernist literary and art journal.

== History ==
The magazine began in 1924 as a newsletter for the Sydney Art Students' Club edited by Dore Hawthorne and Nancy A. Hall. Once it evolved into a professional publication it featured contributions from notable artists of the day including Thea Proctor, Anne Dangar, and Margaret Preston, cementing it as a defining platform for showcasing the work of young women artists.

The name Undergrowth referred to bracken and tangle which they felt was representative of women in the art world. For the first issue the pages were hand sewn by the editors themselves until a year later the first half-tone block was used. The magazine was published bi-monthly and featured prose, verse, and drawing. The editors were gifted a two-colour block by Roland Wakelin.

The advertising prices for Undergrowth were 1 guinea for a full page, and ½ guinea for half a page. You could get copies of the magazine from the Artists Color Store at 219 George Street Sydney.

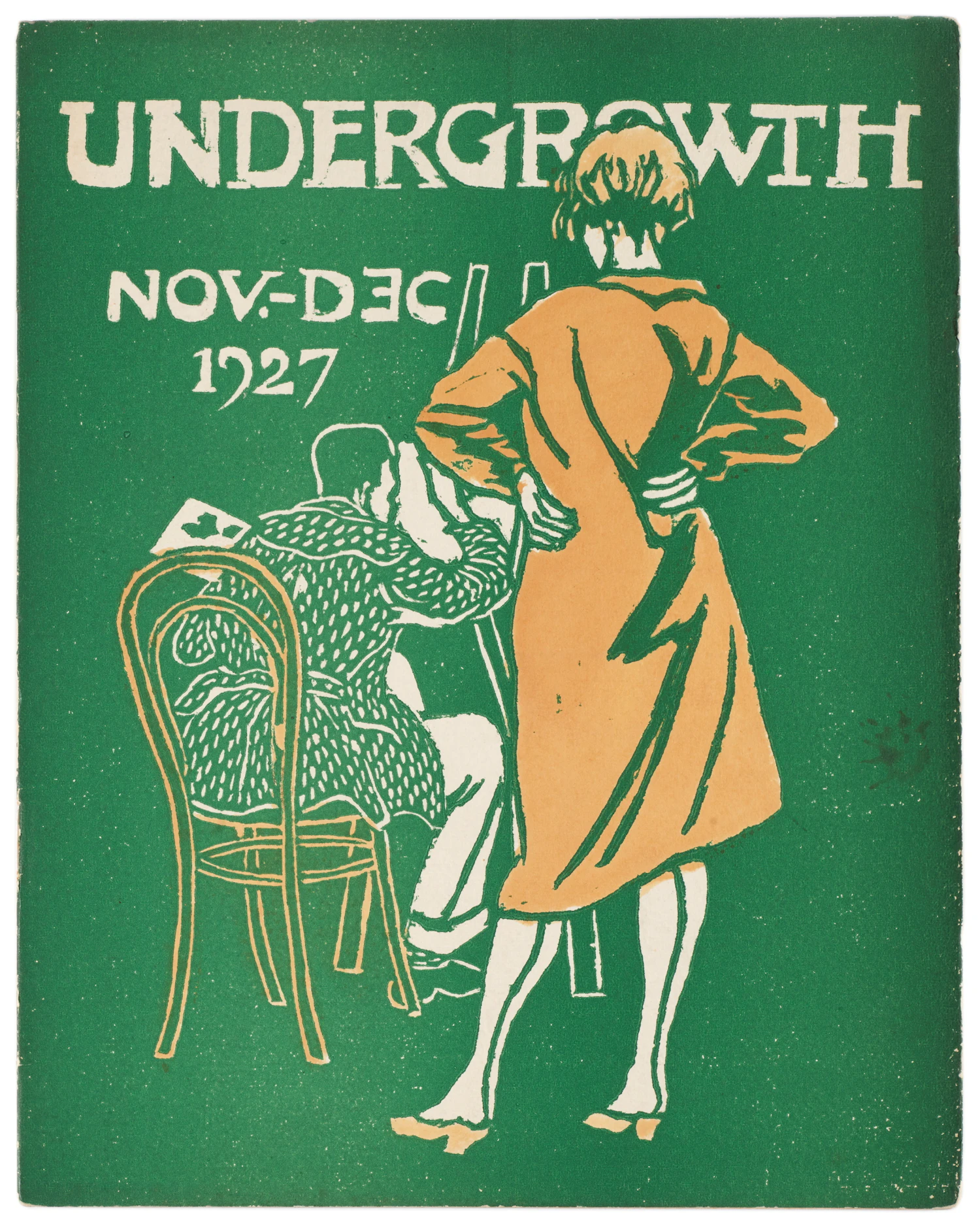

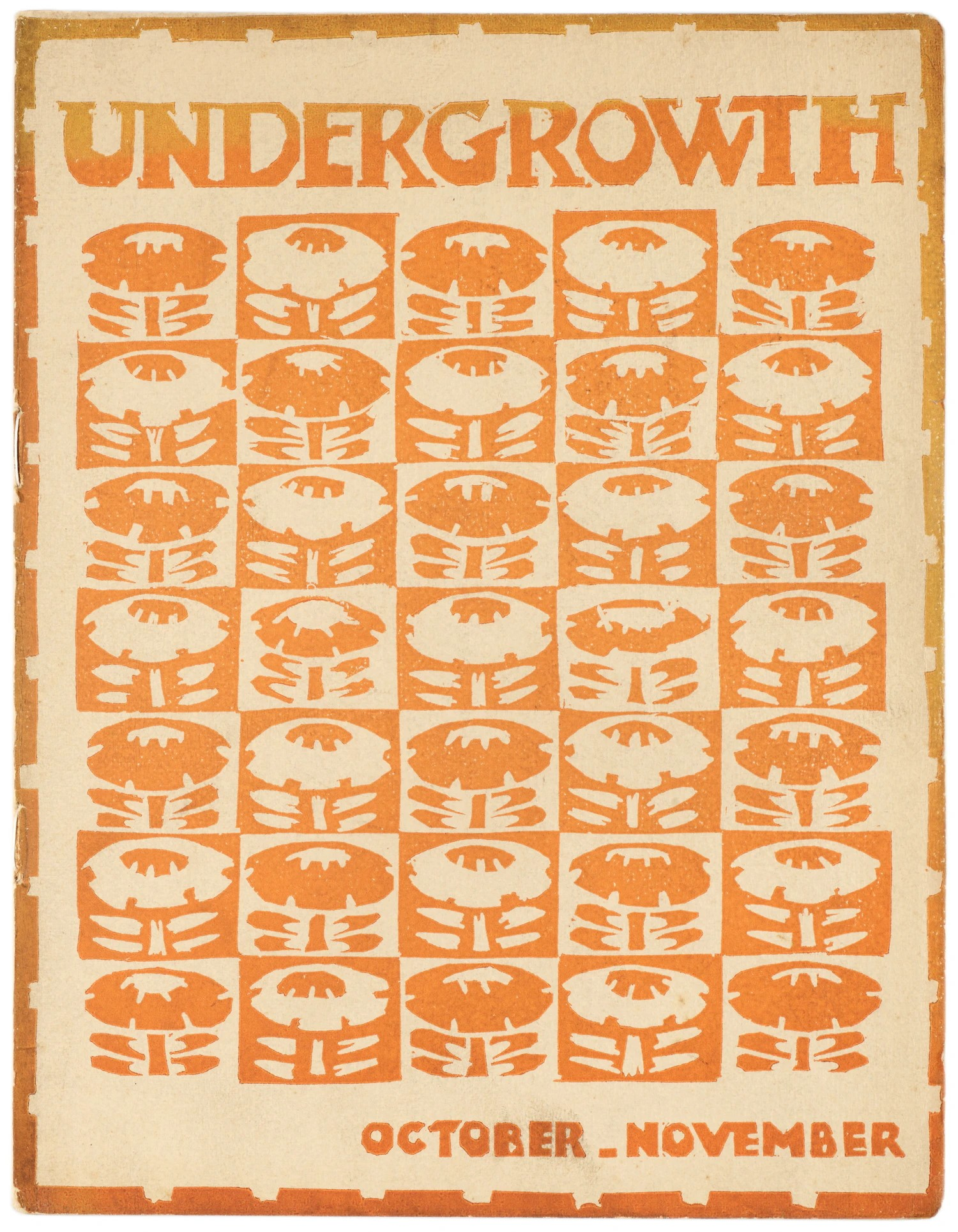

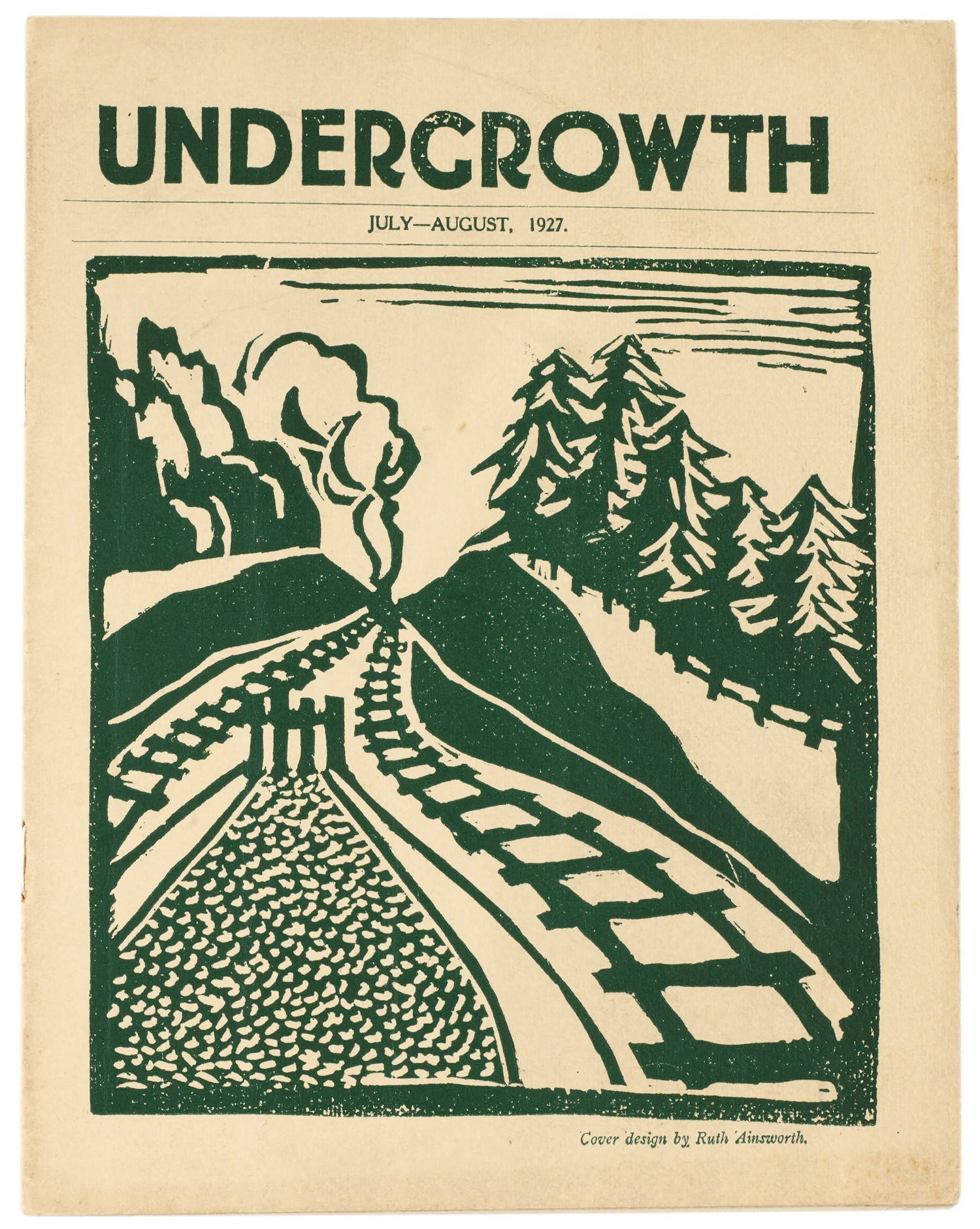

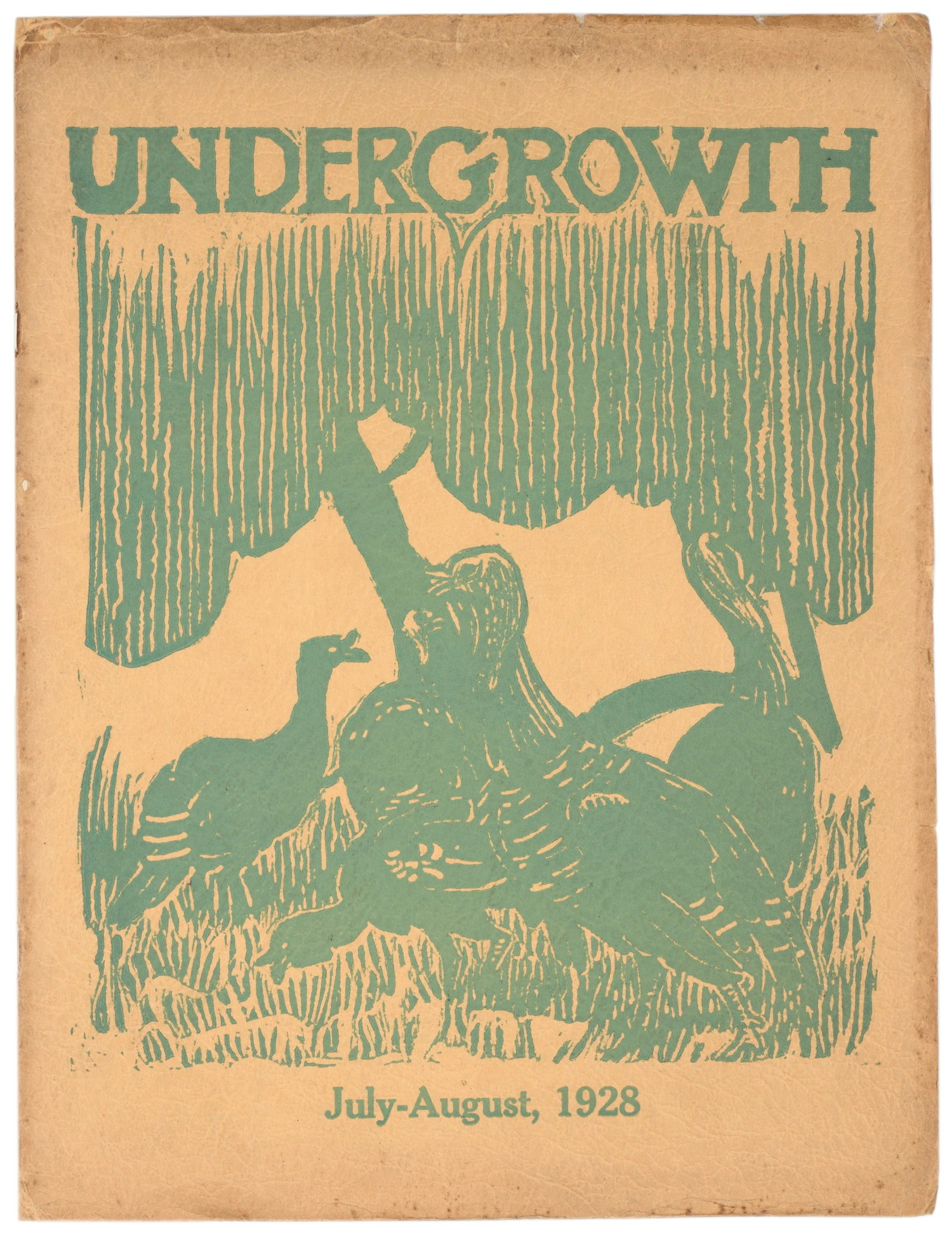
