= Grace Crowley =

Australian artist (1890–1979)

Grace Crowley AM
- Born: Grace Adela Williams Crowley; 28 May 1890; Barraba, New South Wales
- Died: 21 April 1979 (aged 88); Manly, New South Wales
- Education: Methodist Ladies College
- Occupation: Artist
- Parent(s): Elizabeth (née Bridger) and Henry Crowley
- Relatives: Clive Crowley

Grace Adela Williams Crowley AM (pronounced as in "slowly"; 28 May 1890 – 21 April 1979) was an Australian artist and modernist painter.

== Early life and education ==
Grace Crowley was born in May 1890 in Barraba, New South Wales. She was the fourth child of Henry, a grazier, and Elizabeth (née Bridger). By 1900, her family had relocated to a homestead in Glen Riddle, Barraba, where she spent her time drawing people, cats, dogs, kookaburras, and even her father's prize winning bullock. At about the age of 13, Crowley's parents sent one of her pen and ink drawings to New Idea magazine and she won a prize.

As a child, Crowley received an informal education from the governess of her homestead. When this arrangement finished, Crowley and her sister were sent to a boarding school in Sydney. It was at this time that her uncle insisted she attend classes by Julian Ashton at the Sydney Art School, now the Julian Ashton Art School. Once a week she would attend a class with Ashton and practice her drawing skills, this was her first formal education in the arts. When Crowley returned to Glen Riddle, her desire to create art had diminished, partly as a result of her family's expectations of her role in the household and she quickly took on a lot of the household duties. In 1909 Ashton visited Crowley at the family farm and encouraged her artistic practice. In 1915, Crowley became a full-time student at the Sydney Art School and from 1918 to 1923 worked as Ashton's assistant. During her time at the school, Crowley studied alongside; Ralph Balson, John Passmore, Dorrit Black, Herbert Badham, Rah Fizelle, Gerald Lewars, Nancy Hall and John Tilam; regarded with Olive Crane and Myra Cocks as Ashton's "younger skilled brigade". In 1925 Crowley moved to France with her friend and fellow artist Anne Dangar. Crowley studied at the Académie Colarossi and then took private lessons with Beaux-Arts de Paris portrait painter Louis Roger. From 1927 to 1929 she was enrolled at L'académie André Lhote under André Lhote. Throughout the next few years she travelled throughout Europe and briefly studied under Amédée Ozenfant and Albert Gleizes. She moved back to Sydney in 1930.

== Career ==
On her return to Australia, Crowley was one of the most experienced Modernist artists in Australia, with a sophisticated understanding of Cubism. In 1932 she briefly taught at the Black Modern Art Centre before it was closed down. She then went on to start her own school with Rah Fizelle, which was renamed as the Important Centre for Modern Art and was in existence for five years. After a relationship breakdown between Fizelle and Crowley, the school closed in 1937. Fizelle remained at 215a George Street, Crowley however set up a studio at her apartment at 227 George Street. In 1937, Crowley, Balson, Margel Hinder, Rah Fizelle and Eleonore Lange began planning a group exhibition which later came into fruition with fellow painters and sculptors, Frank Medworth, Dadsworth and Gerald Lewers (husband of Margo Lewers) in Exhibition 1: Paintings and Sculptures. The exhibition was opened by H. V. Evatt in the David Jones' Art Gallery in August 1939. In the early 1940s she was one of the first Australians to move into pure abstraction.

With other participating artists including Rah Fizelle, Frank Hinder and Eleonore Lange, Balson and Crowley came together in the 1930s as leaders of the second phase of the modern movement in Australian art, developing the earlier ideas of Roland Wakelin, Roy De Maistre and others at the beginning of World War I.

In 1949, Crowley spent a brief period teaching a course in abstract art at East Sydney Technical College.

During this time and throughout the 1950s, Crowley was most productive. Exhibiting regularly from 1944 to 1954 with the Society of Artists and Contemporary Art Society, Crowley also participated in multiple group exhibitions including; Abstract Paintings Drawings Sculpture Constructions, David Jones Art Gallery, 1948; Contemporary Art Society – Eleventh Annual Interstate Exhibition, 1949; and Abstract Compositions, Paintings, Sculpture, Macquarie Galleries, 1951. In 1954 with Balson's retirement impending, Crowley purchased a house in High Hill, Mittagong, in which she resided alongside her 227 George Street Studio. Only two known paintings were created between 1955 and 1959, an abandonment of geometric forms occurred in exchange for gestural brushwork. In 1960, Crowley and Balson travelled to galleries in England, France and America. A rapid turn in style occurred during this time of travel, notably in Devon where both Crowley and Balson turned to pouring paint in a similar fashion to Jackson Pollock. In August 1964 Balson died unexpectedly, marking the end of Crowley's art practice also. Crowley stayed at the High Hill residence until she purchased a unit in Manly.

In honour of the forerunners of the modern abstract movement, in 1966 the Art Gallery of New South Wales held an exhibition which included Crowley and her colleagues such as Balson, Fizelle and Hinder.

Shortly before her 85th birthday, in 1975 the Art Gallery of New South Wales opened its doors to the first retrospective of Crowley, comprising 25 paintings and 12 drawings. Elena Taylor, the National Gallery of Australia's curator of Australian Painting and Sculpture, notes, "Crowley's long artistic journey over five decades from painter of traditional landscapes to avant-garde abstracts was extraordinary. While Crowley is still best known for her cubist paintings of the 1920s and 1930s, Grace Crowley: Being Modern includes works that have never before been exhibited and reveals the full extent of Crowley's contribution to Australian art.". Her Project 4 Exhibition followed shortly after. In the 1976 Australia Day Honours, Crowley was made a Member of the Order of Australia for her services to Art.

The National Gallery of Australia held a solo exhibition of her work in December 2006 to May 2007 called Grace Crowley – Being Modern. Crowley is represented in the National Gallery of Australia, Art Gallery of New South Wales, National Gallery of Victoria.

== Death ==
Crowley died at her home in Manly, New South Wales, on 21 April 1979 aged 89. She left a small body of works, three of which are held permanently in the Cruthers Collection of Women's Art in the University of Western Australia.

== Selected exhibitions ==
- 1930: A Group of Seven, with Dorrit Black, Roy de Maistre, Roland Wakelin, Enid Cambridge, Grace Cossington Smith and Frank Weitzel, Macquarie Galleries, March.
- 1932: Solo Exhibition, Modern Art Centre, Sydney, June.
- 1939: Exhibition I: Paintings and Sculptures. David Jones' Art Gallery, Sydney, August.
- 1966: Balson Crowley Fizelle Hinder. Art Gallery of New South Wales, May.
- 1975: Australian Women Artists – One Hundred Years: 1840–1940, Ewing and George Paton Galleries, Melbourne, September. Art Gallery of New South Wales, October. National Gallery of Victoria, January.
- May–September 2024: Grace Crowley & Ralph Balson, National Gallery of Victoria
- May-September 2025: Dangerously Modern: Australian Women Artists in Europe 1890-1940, Art Gallery of South Australia
