= Clive Crowley =

Australian grazier

Clive Stanley Crowley
- Born: 2 August 1890; Barraba, Australia
- Died: 25 June 1918 (aged 27); Amiens, France
- Burial place: Longeau British Cemetery, France
- Relatives: Grace Crowley (cousin)
- Military career
- Allegiance: Australia
- Branch: Australian Army
- Service years: 1916–1918
- Rank: Lieutenant
- Unit: 33rd Battalion
- Conflicts: First World War; Western Front; Battle of Messines; Battle of Amiens (DOW)
- Awards: Distinguished Conduct Medal

Clive Stanley Crowley DCM (2 August 1890 – 25 June 1918) was an Australian grazier and soldier who was killed during the First World War. Letters between Crowley and his mother were part of the historical material that inspired the libretto of An Australian War Requiem.

== Family ==
Crowley was one of eight children born to Alice (née Bridger 1859–1949) and John Crowley (1847–1925) of Cobbadah station near Barraba, New South Wales. His siblings were: Mabel (1880–1946); Arley (1882–1959); Royce (1884–1963); Audrey (1886–1943); Mildred (1888–1964); Frank (1892–1937); and Keith (1902–1974). The Crowley family were wealthy Methodist graziers who had pioneered European settlement in north-western New South Wales. They traced their Australian origins to John Crowley, who arrived as a convict in 1803. He was transported for life for stealing a sheep and his son, Clive's grandfather, settled at Cobbadah. The station was in the Nandewar Range, north of Tamworth. Clive was a first cousin, on both the maternal and paternal lines, of the early modern artist Grace Crowley. Both their mothers and fathers were siblings.

== Education ==
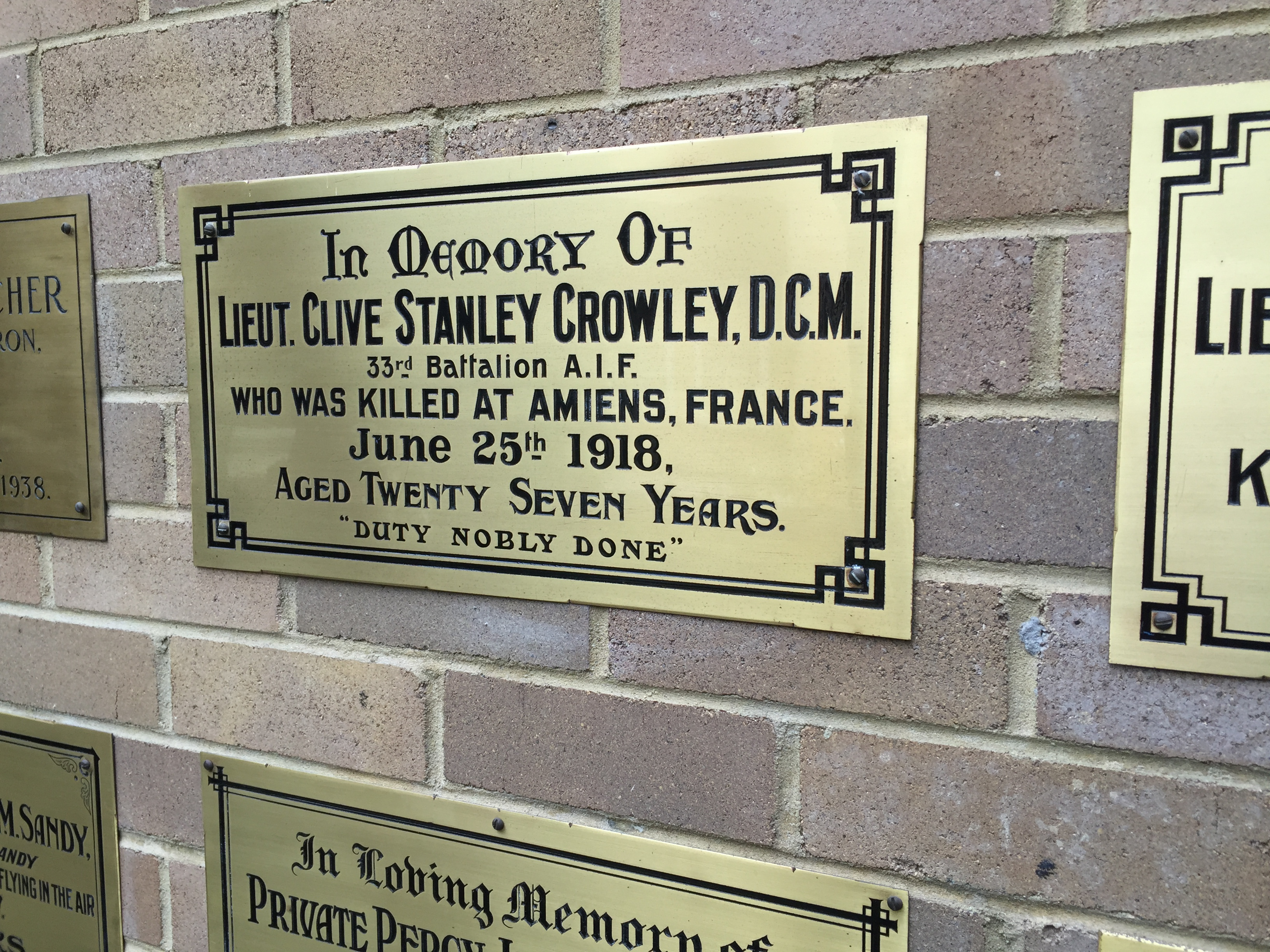
Crowley's memorial plaque in the Newington College Chapel

Members of the extended Crowley family, siblings and cousins, were educated at Cobbadah in a conventional manner by a governess. The children then went to boarding schools in Sydney. In 1905 Crowley and a younger brother, Frank, were enrolled at Newington College. His older brothers, Arley and Royce had already been students at Newington and the youngest boy, Keith, started there in the year after Clive's death. At Newington, Crowley studied on the Modern side and left school at the end of 1906 with a favourable record. The Newingtonian at the time of his death said: "he was one of three brothers who came to the School, while a large number of cousins from other families made the name a very familiar one. Brought up on a station, he lived the life of outdoor activity that has given the Australian Army so many of its alert and competent soldiers."

== First World War ==
On enlistment, Crowley was a lance corporal in B Company of the 33rd Battalion. He embarked from Sydney, New South Wales, on board HMAT A74 Marathon on 4 May 1916. During service he was commissioned as a lieutenant. Crowley was awarded the Distinguished Conduct Medal for his actions on 14 June 1917 at the Battle of Messines for "conspicuous gallantry and devotion to duty when in command of his platoons. He organized the consolidation and captured an advanced post and a field gun with great dash, afterwards holding the captured post under heavy shell fire and keeping his men well in hand by his cheerfulness and optimism."

== Death ==
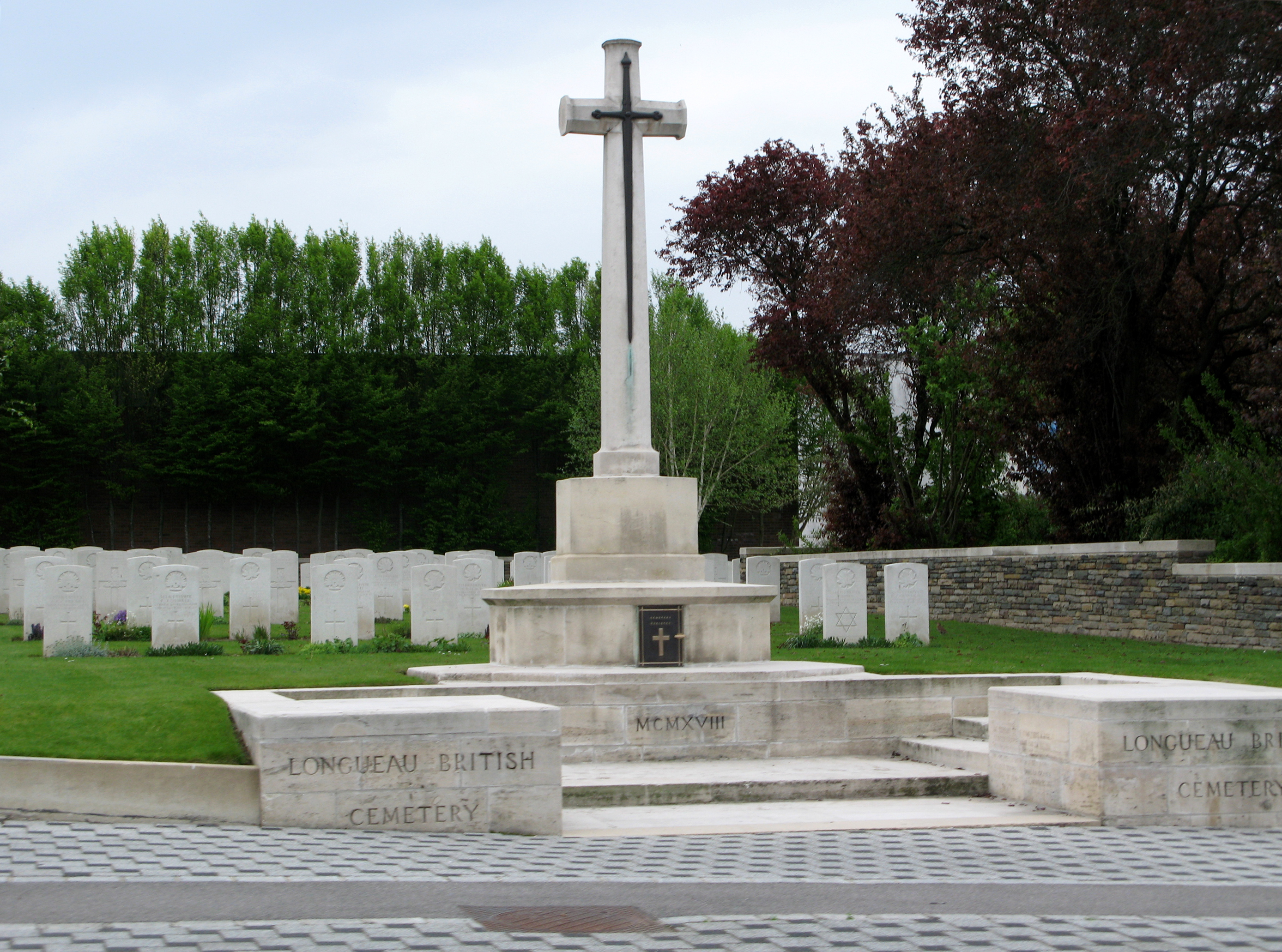
Crowley is buried in the Longueau British Cemetery in France

Crowley was badly gassed at the Second Battle of Villers-Bretonneux and died of wounds. He is buried at Longueau British Cemetery in France. Crowley is commemorated by a brass plaque in the Newington College Chapel, on the school's First World War honour board and on the Barraba and District War Memorial.

== An Australian War Requiem ==
The centenary of the commencement of the First World War was marked by the Sydney University Graduate Choir who commissioned composer Christopher Bowen and librettist Pamela Traynor to write an Australian war requiem. The work incorporates elements of the Stabat Mater. Letters written by Crowley and his mother to each other have inspired the composition of the libretto. Traynor has said when asked what was the most poignant and enduring image evoked by these letters: "I still get very upset when I think about it. It’s a small part of the libretto, towards the end—a pastor has written about this young soldier who’d been out in the battle and is attacked by gas. The last words of this young man that were witnessed as he walked off the front line were ‘I’m done. Get your gas helmets on, boys’. And that will forever stay in my memory because I knew him, it was so real to me. That soldier was young Clive Crowley. I had come to know him through the heartfelt letters his mother Alice had written to him. Clive didn't ever recover, he died. It upset me greatly."

"My very dear Clive," Alice wrote. "I am feeling awfully low spirited dearest since hearing such very terrible news relating to this fearful war. It just feels too heavy to bear. Whenever will it end and I am always wondering how you are, my poor dear Clive away over in that wretched place..."

With a 250 voice choir, five soloists and a full orchestra, An Australian War Requiem premiered at the Sydney Town Hall in August 2014.
