= Andrée Le Coultre =

French painter (1917–1986)

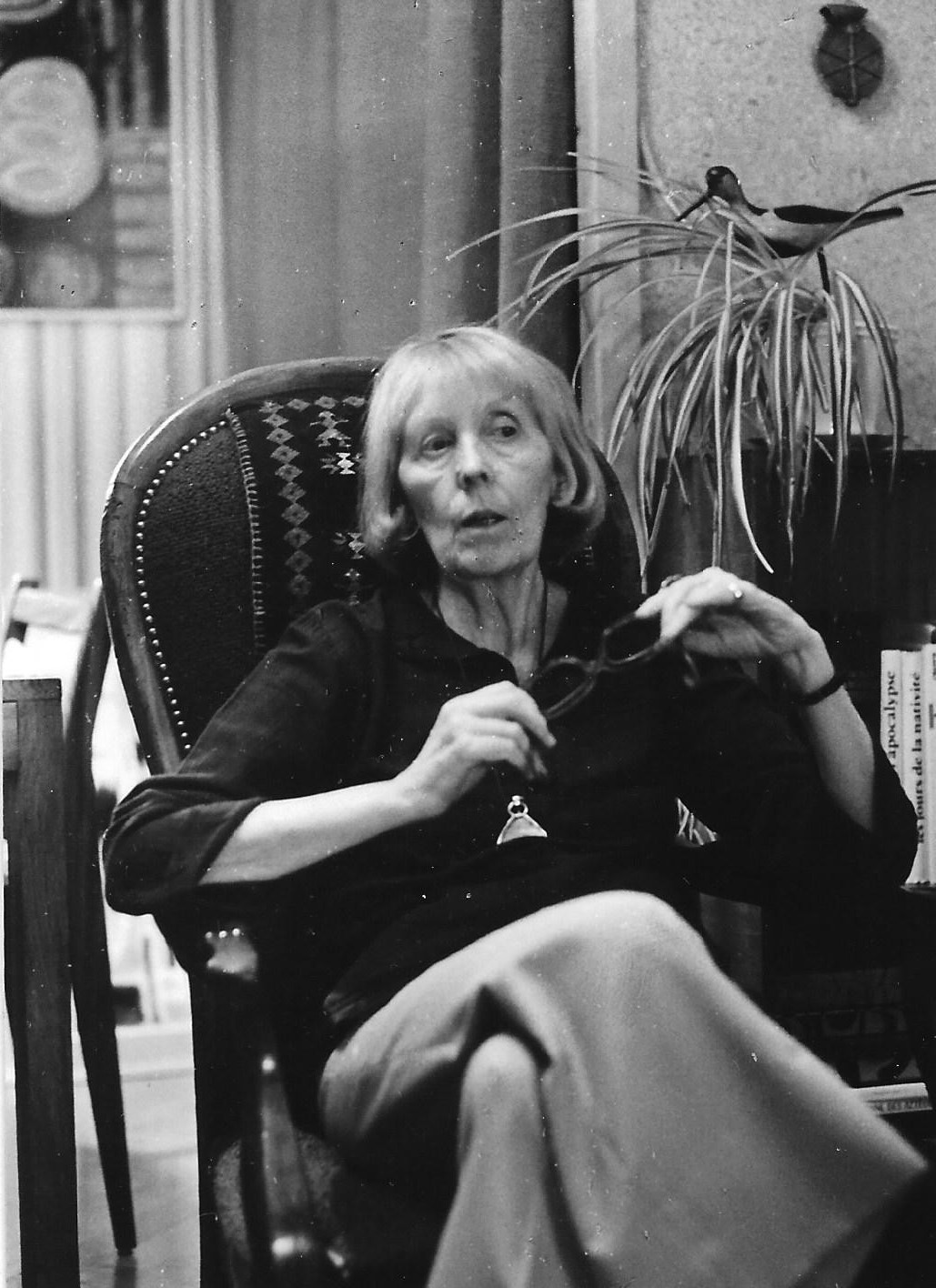
- Born: 1917; La Chaux-de-Fonds, Switzerland
- Died: July 6, 1986
- Education: École des Beaux-arts de Lyon
- Known for: cubist painting
- Spouse: Paul Régny

Andrée Le Coultre (1917 – 6 July 1986) was a French painter in the cubist tradition coached by Albert Gleizes. She was born in La Chaux-de-Fonds, Switzerland but spent her entire life in Lyon where her parents moved when she was an infant. She acquired French nationality in 1942 after her marriage to Paul Régny.

== Life and education ==
Le Coultre and Paul Régny met while taking evening classes from Antoine Chartres at the École des Beaux-arts de Lyon, where she also met Louis Bellon, Maurice Férréol. She was married to Régny in 1942. She and Régny attended evening classes together from Eugène Claudius-Petit. In 1941, she and Régny visited the potter Anne Dangar who was participating at the Moly-Sabata artist colony created by Albert Gleizes. In 1942 she participated in an exhibition at Marcel Michaud's Folklore gallery ("Peintures féminines") where she also worked for some time as a secretary. Both attended the Académie du Minotaure created by René-Maria Burlet.

Le Coultre's mission was to rapidly find direction and meaning to her work. She read a lot of books on art and artists, and was influenced by Van Gogh, Cézanne, Matisse, Robert Delaunay, André Lhote, Léger, and others. The art of the Middle Ages was also an influence, especially the reds and the blues of the stained glass windows of Chartres Cathedral. Her quest, shared with her husband, turned to the thought of Albert Gleizes, who she first contacted by correspondence in April 1945. Le Coultre wrote, "Gleizes influenced my work towards a structured figurativism." (Note: "Gleizes a influencé mon travail vers une figuration structurée.") Her plans at that point were that she and Régny would move either to the artist colony, or nearby Gleizes in St-Rémy-de-Provence; however, in the end, these plans did not come to fruition.

Andrée Le Coultre died on 6 July 1986. On the 12th, according to the wishes of her husband Paul Regny, her coffin was at St. Joseph Church in Tassin, surrounded by the many paintings Le Coultre had painted on the walls of the Church.

== Career ==
=== Exhibitions ===
In 1946, René Deroudille exhibited a retrospective of Le Coultre's paintings at the Maison de la Pensée Française. The couple started working that year according to the principles of Albert Gleizes, whom they finally met in 1947 and with whom they remained in regular correspondence, concerning paintings they submitted to him.

Le Coultre exhibited regularly, sometimes in Paris at the Salon des Réalités Nouvelles, often in group exhibitions, and annually at the Lyon salons (the Salon d'Automne, the Salon Regain and starting in 1981 at the Salon du Sud-Est). Her works were regularly exhibited in galleries: at Paul Mauradian's Pantographe, Folklore, Galerie de l'Institut in Paris, l'Oeil Ecoute, and, posthumously, at the Galerie Malaval and at Olivier Houg (Red Room).}

She participated with her husband in the decoration of the new Saint Joseph Church in Tassin-la-Demi-Lune, created a Virgin for the church of St. Anne de Menival (Lyon), and a large oil ("l'Imaginaire") for the Jacques Prévert pre-school in La-Demi-Lune.

In 2017, ten of her pieces were exhibited in the Musée de Beaux Arts de Lyon, honoring the donation of eighteen paintings to the museum by their son, Marc Régny.

=== Teaching ===
In 1948 she participated as an instructor along with Paul Régny and Jean Chevalier in hosting a workshop for amateur artists, the Arc-en-ciel (Rainbow), managed by Albert Gleizes. They stayed at Gleizes's home in Saint-Rémy-de-Provence. In 1948, the couple spent a time at Gleizes Méjades property in Provence, giving a workshop on Gleizes's method and his pictorial techniques.

From the late 40s on, Andrée Le Coultre drew on her personal experience of art and creation to convey painting and pictorial techniques to many students either in private lessons, in schools (private primary school Vincent Serre in La-Demi-Lune, and at the school of Social Service in Lyon. After 1968, she taught workshops to children via the administration of the local commune, and painting workshops for senior citizens.

In later years, she gave up teaching children due to her heart condition. She began producing small-format works with colored pencils.

== Motifs and themes ==
After her debut with Antoine Chartres, she turned toward a more geometric style inspired by André Lhote and Fernand Léger, developing figurative compositions characterized by the colors of Matisse and the stained glass windows of Chartres Cathedral.

Le Coultre was influenced by her 1946 meeting with Albert Gleizes, who subsequently followed her oeuvre. Le Coultre's work became characterized by non-figurative paintings or gouaches composed, following Gleizes's theories, of geometric shapes in muted colors, open circles, and broken lines. (Note: ...geometric shapes treated in swatches of muted harmonies where ochres, blues and greens predominate, surrounded by open circles and framed by broken lines, giving rise to rhythm and cadence, the eye thus creating the shifts and rotations inherent in what was conventionally called the tableau-objet [i.e., painting as a subject in itself]. ...de formes géométriques traitées en aplats dans des harmonies sourdes où dominent les ocres, les bleus et le verts, cernées de cercles ouverts et encadrés de lignes brisées, entraînant rythme et cadence, l'œil créant ainsi les translations et rotations inhérentes à ce qu'il était convenu d'appeler le tableau-objet.) But very soon, Le Coultre and Régny began to introduce their own variations to Gleizes's themes and practice, as Gleizes himself wished.

In the 1950s and 1960s, Andrée Le Coultre started exploring themes of her own, alternating non-figurative motifs with a return to specific topics such as religious subjects, where one can feel the influence of medieval art and Irish art, drawn for example from the Old Testament or from the Apocalypse, which gives space for her more imaginary visions to take flight; but also of scenes of daily life where constructions, rhythms, modulations and color harmonies like reds and blues can come into play.

== Criticism and commentary ==
According to Olivier Houg, a return to a more figurative style in the 1960s and 1970s gave her the opportunity to show her talents in design and color. In the notes for a 1978 exhibition, Le Coultre said that after following rigorous principles [of Gleizes] for some time, she was becoming more spontaneous: "Imagination is grafted onto construction to express a space where 'creatures' arise and evolve, sometimes in spite of myself. In this effort, the 'blueprint' is abandoned and each painting is an adventure. I don't know where I'm going to end up and who I'm going to encounter en route."

In 1985, René Deroudille said that Le Coultre "takes us to passionate, unknown, far-away lands..." and went on: "With allusions to the deep, warm colors of stained glass, her colors announce their dominance..., scarlet shades with numerous, subtle modulations. Painting becomes a spiritual exercise, and participates in the deep universe of the collective unconscious, as explored and expressed by the poet."

Jean-Jacques Lerrant, writing for the catalog of the Salon du Sud-Est exhibition, said, "What an itinerary! Born of Cubist rationality, tinged by Gleizes' esotericism, Andrée Le Coultre turns to flora, fauna, castles of dreams... Nothing has been in vain. She has the power to capture the moment of metamorphoses."

== Works ==
In 2017, eighteen of Le Coultre's works were donated to the Musée de Beaux Arts de Lyon by their son, Marc Régny, occasioning an exhibition of her works, juxtaposed with two by Albert Gleizes in the museum's permanent collection, Danseuse espagnole (1916) and Terre et ciel (1935).

=== Held in the Musée de Beaux Arts de Lyon ===
- La Musique, 1945, oil on canvas
- Composition, 1951, oil on cardboard
- Corsage rouge, 1958, oil on hardboard
- Composition, 1960, oil on paper laminated onto cardboard
- Composition, 1963, oil on canvas
- Laitone, 1967, oil on canvas
- La Coiffure, 1968, oil on canvas
- Naissance de Gargantua, 1971, oil on paper laminated to cardboard
- Untitled, circa 1980–1986, oil on paper laminated to cardboard
- Vertiges, 1962, oil on canvas

== Sources ==
- Berthon, Laurence; Gauthier, Jean-Claude (2009). Paul Regny et Andrée Le Coultre, peintres à Lyon au XX siècle [Paul Regny and Andrée Le Coultre, 20th century Lyon painters] (in French). Rochetoirin: Notre studio. ISBN 978-2-9535034-0-1.
- Deroudille, René (14 May 1985). "(untitled)". Lyon Matin.
- Histoire de la peinture à Lyon et en Rhônes-Alpes depuis 1865 [History of Painting in Lyon and Rhônes-Alpes since 1865] (in French). Catalogue Musée Paul Dini: La Collection, Musée Paul Dini.
- Gouttenoire, Bernard (2000). Dictionnaire des peintres & sculpteurs à Lyon aux XIXe & XXe siècles [Dictionary of Painters and Sculptors in Lyon in the 19th and 20th Centuries] (in French). Châtillon-en-Chalaronne: La Taillanderie. ISBN 978-2-87629-222-2. OCLC 248124906.
- Houg, Olivier (2005). Andrée Le Coultre Comme un fil sans fin [Andrée Le Coultre Like an Infinite Thread] (in French). Lyon: Red Room.
- "Andrée Le Coultre Paul Regny Présentation de la Donation du 18 mai au 06 aout 2017" (PDF). Musée de Beaux Art Lyon (press release) (in French). 2017. Archived from the original (PDF) on 1 July 2017.
- "Moly-Sabata / Fondation Albert Gleizes: Résidence d'artistes: Depuis 1927" [Moly-Sabata / Albert Gleizes Foundation: Artists' Residence: Since 1927] (in French). Paris: Fondation Albert Gleizes.
- Salon du Sud Est - Andrée Le Coultre (Exhibition catalog) (in French), Lyon: Salon du Sud Est, 14 November 2004
- "exposition 'Langages au féminin'" [Exhibition "Feminine Languages"], E.L.A.C. Magazine (in French), 4, 1978
