= Margel Hinder =

Australian sculptor (1905–1995)

Margel Ina Harris Hinder AM (4 January 1906 in Brooklyn, New York – 29 May 1995 in Roseville, New South Wales) was an Australian-American modernist sculptor, noted for her kinetic and public sculptural works. Her sculptures are found outside the Australian Reserve Bank building in Martin Place, Sydney, in a memorial in Newcastle, New South Wales, and in Canberra, ACT. Her work is held in several Australian public collections.

== Biography ==
Hinder was born Margel Ina Harris in New York. Her parents were Wilson Park Harris and Helen Haist and her father worked in a steel foundry and later as a photographer in New York. She attended art schools in the United States: children's classes at the Albright Art School, Buffalo, New York; and the Boston Museum School, Boston.

== Early to mid-career ==
By May 1935 she was exhibiting in Sydney with the Women's Industrial Art Society. In 1938 she submitted carved wooden bookends in the shape of koalas for their annual exhibition and the following year she was exhibiting as a sculptor in the David Jones Gallery in Sydney. The arts writer of the Sydney Morning Herald referred to her "unusual blocky carving of two doves preening their wings". In 1939, her partnership with her painter husband Frank Hinder was being noted by a journalist from the Sydney Morning Herald after Hinder and her husband won a competition run by the Water Board of NSW for a figure design for their new building in Sydney. Hinder's husband did the drawings while she created a maquette in plaster. Hinder was already showing a preference for carving in wood, rather than stone, although she had problems getting wood that was hard enough although this was solved by sourcing the wood from a plantation in Papua New Guinea.

Hinder's interest in cubist constructivist art was influenced by Eleonore Lange, a German-born artist who had arrived in 1930. Lange was one of a small number of artists who was interested in modernism in Sydney during the 1930s. It was Lange who organised Exhibition 1 in Sydney 1939, showcasing a ground-breaking group of artists, including Hinder, who shared an interest in semi-abstract painting and sculpture.

Hinder moved with her family to Canberra during the war years and Hinder started to explore the use of steel in her sculptures.

== Career highlights ==
Post-war Hinder moved back to Sydney and was in a group exhibition at the David Jones Gallery, showing abstract art with Ralph Balson, Grace Crowley, Dora Chapman, Gerald Lewers, and Margo Lewers. The following year Hinder was back at the David Jones Gallery exhibiting glass and plastic carved shapes which emphasised theories of time and space'. In an interview with the Sydney Morning Herald she talked about juggling her family life, teaching at a technical college and giving lectures at an Art Gallery of NSW. In the opinion of the art critic of the Sydney Morning Herald, sculpture was struggling to keep up with painting, referring to it as a 'neglected art', but they took time to carefully review works in the exhibition although only generally referring to Hinder's sandstone "Garden Sculpture". It was noted in a later article that this work was the first abstract sculpture acquired by the 'Art Gallery of New South Wales'. At the same time Hinder was the subject of a feature article in the Australian Women's Day and she was exploring rounded wire shapes that would be incorporated in her work in future decades.

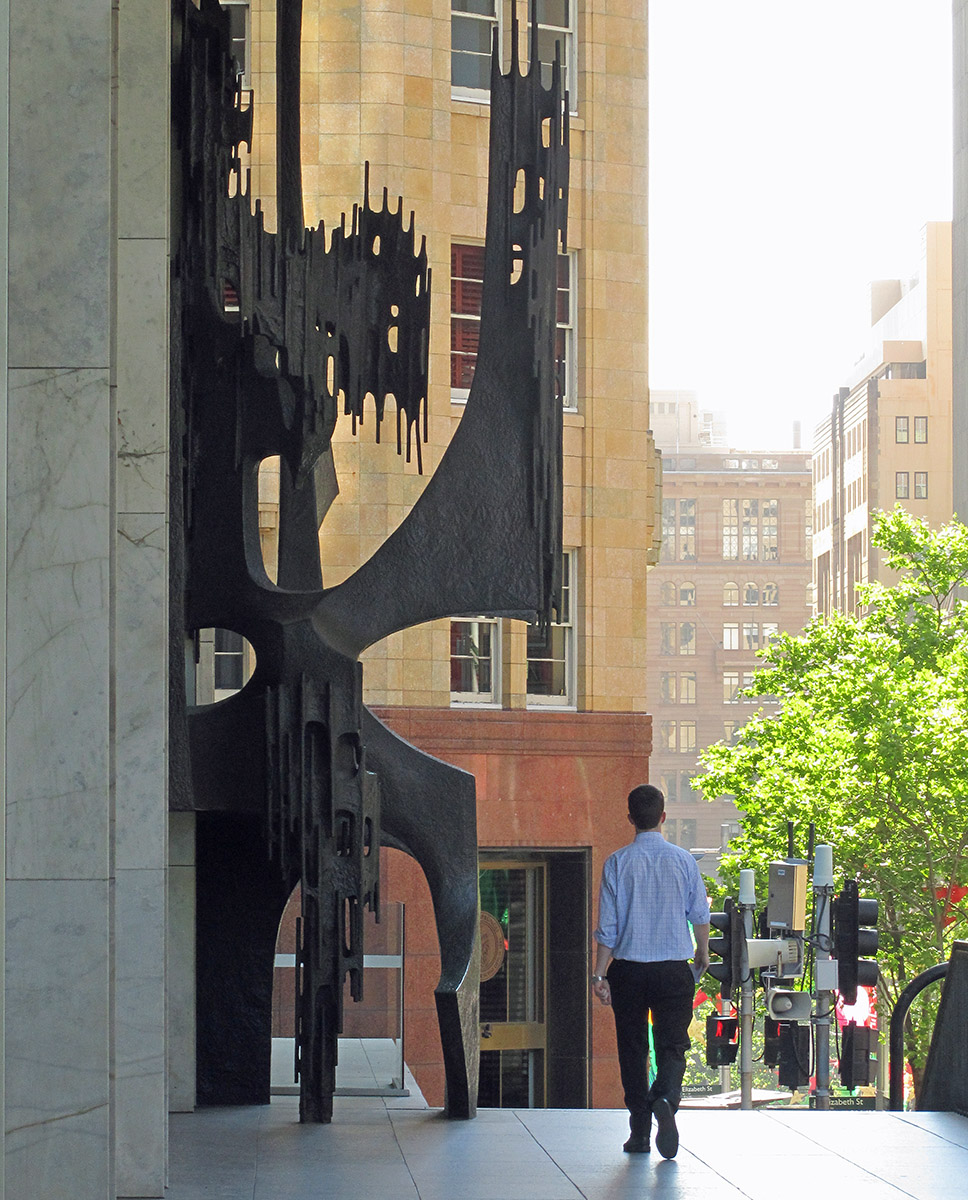
Margel Hinder's sculpture installed outside the Reserve Bank of Australia in Martin Place

In 1953 a sculpture of Hinder's was selected along with sculptures by Tom Bass and John Joseph Bruhn for an International sculptural competition on the theme of The Unknown Political Prisoner. Her work was based on hand movements and was to be installed in water, with the resulting reflections part of the design. Despite the comments of some critics, Hinder's work went on to win a prize of 275 pounds, announced at the Tate Gallery in London. She remarked to a journalist that she thought 'abstract artists have a hard time in Australia' and felt that their work was 'neither liked nor understood".

Hinder's work outside the Reserve Bank of Australia in Martin Place was commissioned after she won an international competition for sculptors in 1961. The abstract work created from cast copper with a steel core drew mixed responses to the form that people found difficult to identify. The first Governor of the Reserve Bank of Australia Dr H. C. Coombs was resolute in his support of the selection of the work and even wrote a memorandum to staff with an explanation of the work However, it was a city that was at the same time somewhat polarised by Jørn Utzon's design for the Sydney Opera House. The same year she won the religious art Blake Prize for sculpture with her depiction of Christ on the Cross.

When the Monaro Mall was built in 1963 in the centre of the fast-expanding city of Canberra, Hinder was commissioned to create a large spherical mobile sculpture to be located in the middle of the Mall above the escalators. Revolving Sphere, 1963 consisted of a motorised spinning sphere that reflected light as it moved. The modernist Mall was the first air-conditioned and enclosed shopping centre in Australia. Two years later Hinder organised a touring sculpture exhibition considered somewhat of a 'milestone' as it was the first time a touring exhibition of sculpture had been organised. It was called 'Recent Australian Sculpture' and in Canberra was shown at the Menzies Library at the Australian National University. It was sponsored by the Commonwealth Art Advisory Board.

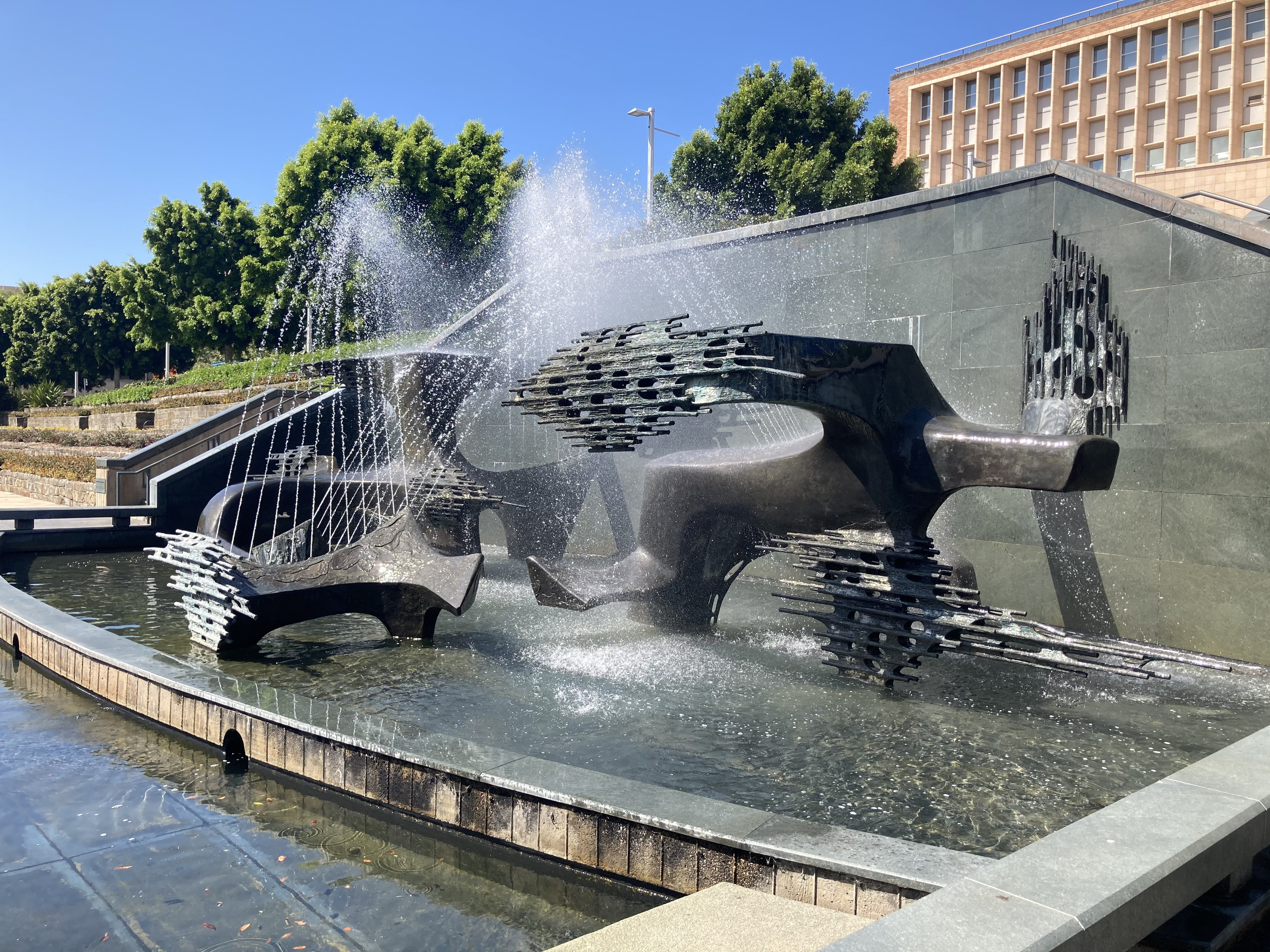
Captain James Cook Memorial Fountain (1966) Civic Park, Newcastle, New South Wales

Hinder's acknowledged master work is the water sculpture known as the Captain James Cook Memorial Fountain located in Newcastle, New South Wales's Civic Park. Completed in 1966, it was created with steel, copper and granite.

In 1969, Hinder's large aluminium abstract sculpture Sculptured Form was selected by the NCDC to be installed in the Woden Town Square. The sculpture had been chosen from the Comalco Invitation Award. Six sculptors were invited to create a 'free-standing work of sculpture which would stand in a public urban space to symbolise the growth and metamorphosis of a typical natural Australian environment into complex development for urban use'.

In 1973 Hinder completed another large sculpture, this time for the forecourt of the Telecommunications Building in Adelaide.

She was appointed a Member of the Order of Australia in the 1979 Australia Day Honours.

== Personal ==
Hinder was married to fellow artist Australian-born Francis Critcheley Hinder, known as Frank Hinder. They were married in Wellesley, Massachusetts in 1930. Hinder arrived with her husband in Australia in late 1934. Hinder made her mark both as an artist or 'sculptress' as she was often referred to by arts writers. She was described as 'tall, slim' brunette and attractive' and given to wearing "strikingly original clothes' and the hats which she designed. They exhibited together in group exhibitions, and had two retrospective exhibits: 1973 at the Newcastle Regional Gallery and 1980 at the Art Gallery of NSW). Frank and Margel Hinder are the subject of a biography by Renee Free.

Margel Hinder died on 29 May 1995 at Roseville, New South Wales

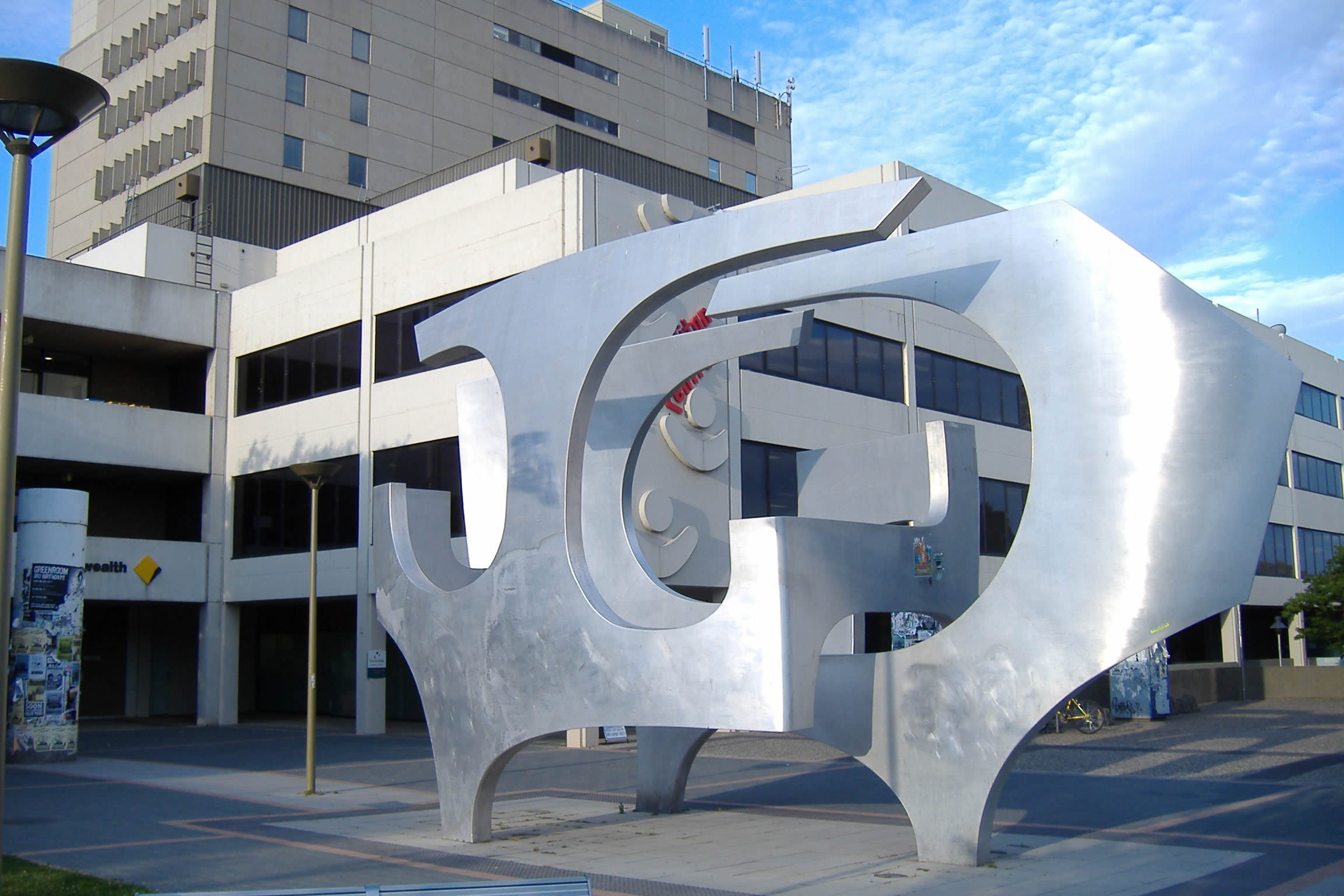
"Sculptured Form" (1970) Woden, ACT

== Selected works ==
- 1939 Man with jackhammer, National Gallery of Victoria in Melbourne
- 1949 Garden Sculpture, Art Gallery of New South Wales in Sydney
- 1970 Sculptured Form, Woden Town Square in Canberra
- 1973 Free-Standing Sculpture, Telecommunication Building in Adelaide

== Sources ==
- Hinder's work at the Reserve Bank of Australia
- Margel Hinder at Dictionary of Australian Artists Online
- 1976 Portrait of Margel Hinder by Richard Beck
- Image of Hinder in her studio (1976)
