= Enid Cambridge =

Australian painter

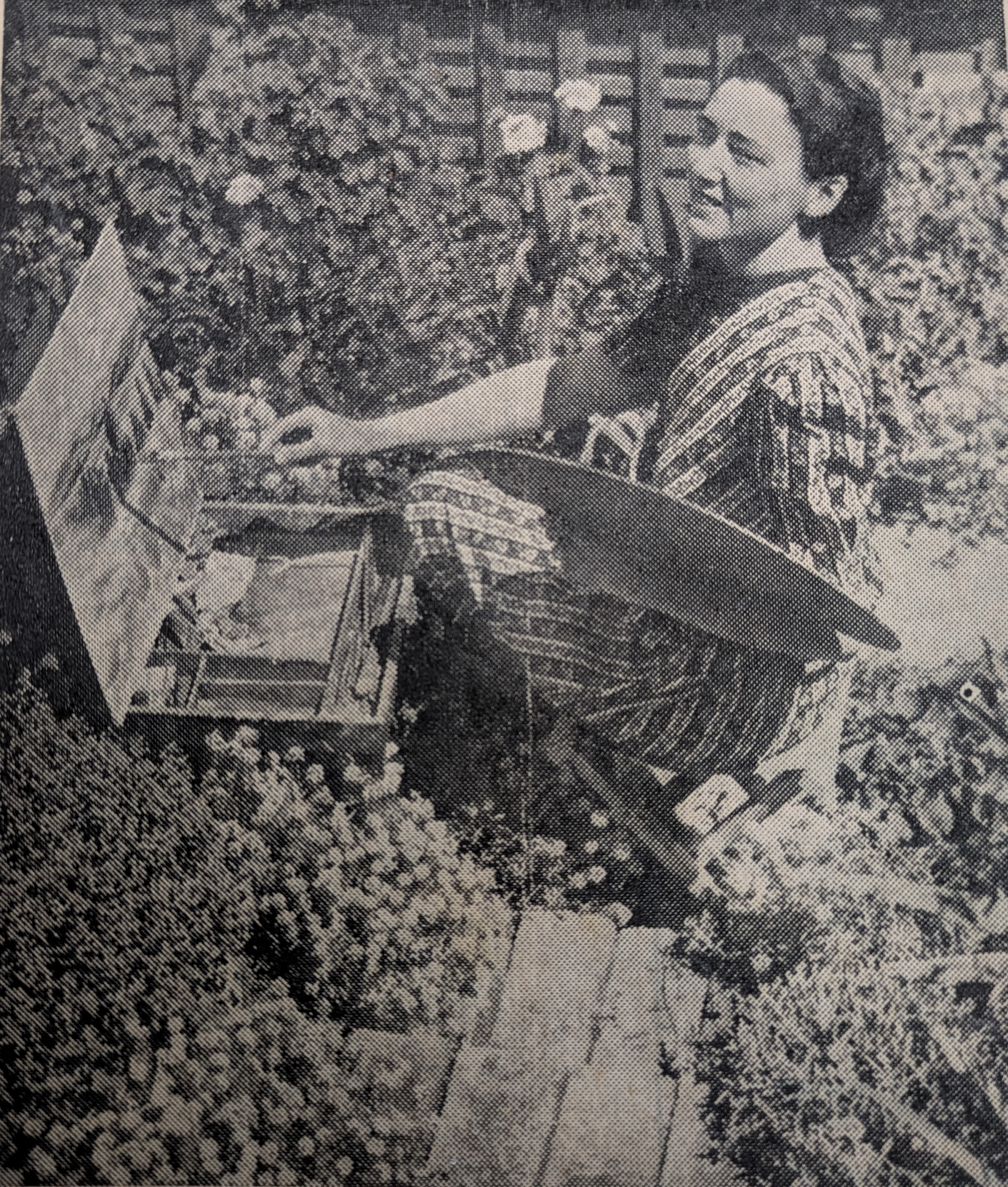
- Born: Enid Helen Gray Cambridge; 10 July 1903; Mosman, New South Wales, Australia
- Died: 1 December 1976 (aged 73); North Ryde, New South Wales, Australia
- Education: National Art School
- Known for: Watercolours
- Notable work: Bush Scene
- Awards: Bendigo Art Prize

Enid Helen Gray Cambridge (10 July 1903 – 1 December 1976) was an Australian artist.

== Biography ==
Cambridge was born in 1903 in Mosman, New South Wales to Henry Gray Cambridge and Olga Stella Hayes Harnett. The middle of four siblings, she had an older brother Geoffrey and older sister Hilarie, and two younger brothers, Richard and Milton. She described the excitement of receiving a giant box of paints for Christmas when she was young.

She studied at the Sydney Art School under Julian Ashton like fellow artist Thea Proctor before her, and alongside fellow students Dorrit Black and Grace Crowley. In 1930 she exhibited at Macquarie Galleries alongside Black and Crowley, as well as Grace Cossington-Smith. Her canvas "George-street North" was described in the Sydney Mail as "the best" in an exhibition with her contemporary friends.

While she taught for over thirty years as Senior Art Mistress at the Sydney Church of England Girls' Grammar School in Darlinghurst, this did not belay her own artistic endeavours. In 1948 she won the £25 watercolour prize at Bendigo Art Gallery for her piece "Bush Scene."

A frequent exhibitor of her work, Cambridge's style did receive compliments among the harsh critiques of female artists of the period. "Miss Cambridge is a painter of originality extremely sensitive to mood" said the Sydney Morning Herald's critic, and the Daily Telegraph said "her watercolours have always a feminine grace of line and a precise delicacy of tonal adjustment" while in the same article saying she was capable of better.

Another artist who contributed to her education was Roland Wakelin, and many reviews discuss his influence on her work. Cambridge herself said "Life started when I went to Mr Wakelin." She later went overseas in 1959–1960 to study at Salzburg with Oskar Kokoschka.

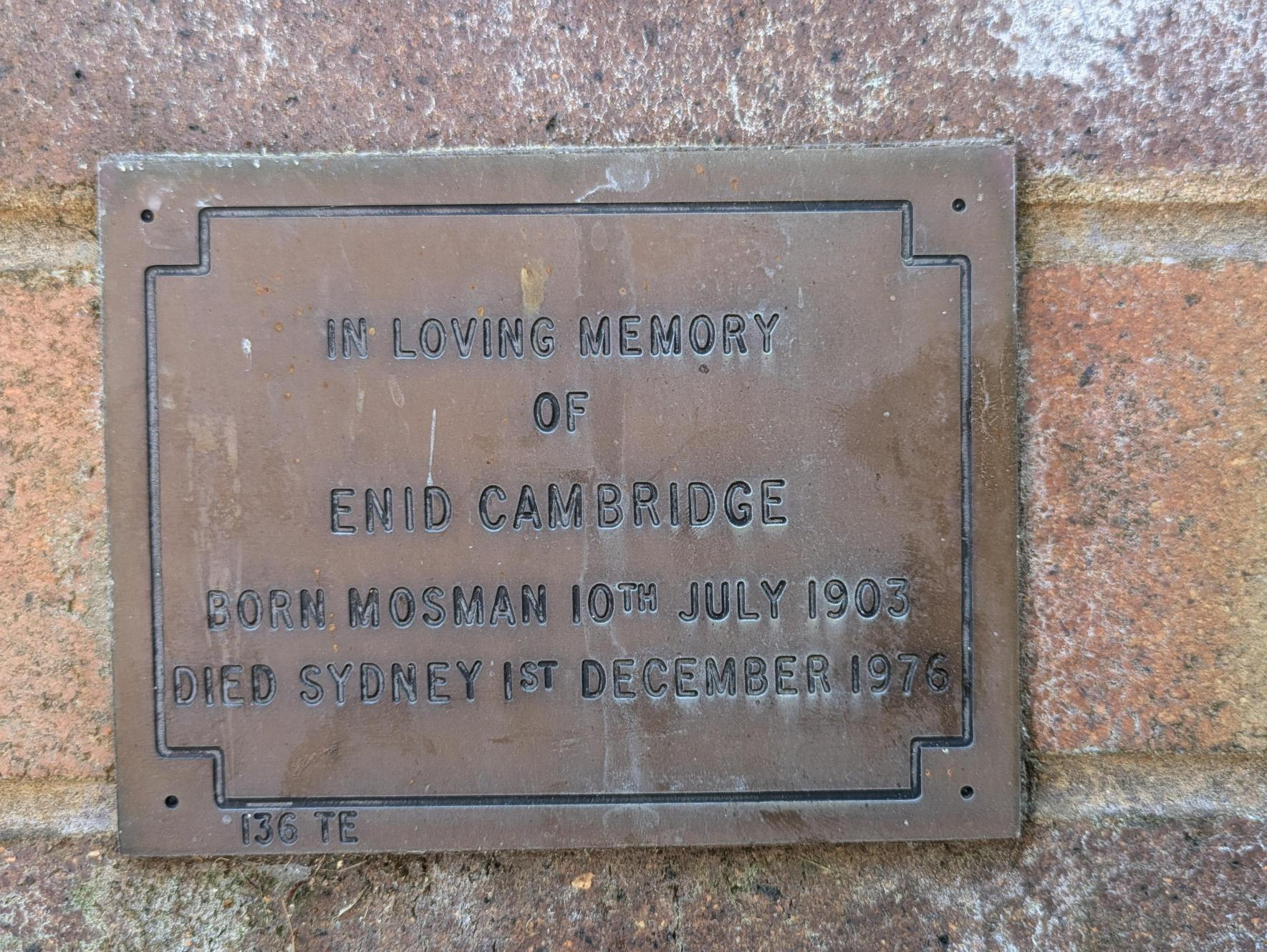

As well as many solo exhibitions, Cambridge exhibited with George Bell's Contemporary Art Group from 1936 until its disbandment in 1959, from 1941 with the Australian Watercolour Institute, and in 1943 she joined the Society of Artists.

Her friendship with Grace Cossington-Smith continued throughout their lives, helping her overcome the hardships of pursuing a creative life. After her death in 1976, Cossington-Smith said of Enid "Her sudden death is the ordained fulfilment of a dedicated life. Her loss to this community is a very great one, and a sorrow to us all."

The works of Enid Cambridge are represented in the collections of the National Gallery of Australia, Art Gallery of New South Wales, National Gallery of Victoria, Queensland Art Gallery, and Bendigo Art Gallery.

== Awards ==
- 1948 – Bendigo Art Prize
- 1954 – Mosman Art Prize
- 1962 – Hunters Hill Art Prize
- 1962 – North Sydney Watercolour Prize
- 1962 – Ashfield Art Prize
