= Anne Dangar =

Australian artist (1885–1951)

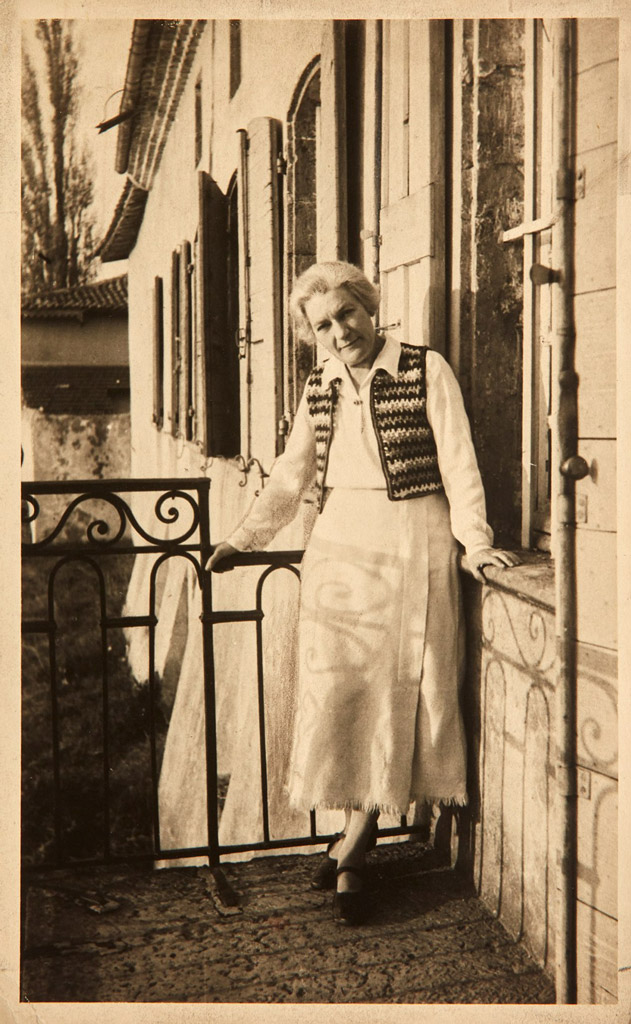
- Anne Dangar on the balcony at Moly-Sabata, 1940s. Source: Art Gallery of New South Wales Archive
- Born: Anne Garvin Dangar; 1 December 1885; Kempsey, New South Wales
- Died: 4 September 1951 (aged 65); France
- Occupation(s): Painter and potter

Anne Dangar (1 December 1885 – 4 September 1951) was an Australian painter and potter.

== Life and training ==
Dangar was born in Kempsey, a town on the mid-north coast of New South Wales, daughter of Otho Dangar, who was a member of the Legislative Assembly and Elizabeth Dangar. From 1906 Dangar studied art in Sydney with Horace Moore-Jones and then at the Julian Ashton Art School in Sydney. Dangar began teaching there in 1920, while also working at the book publishing company Angus & Robertson.

In 1926, Dangar travelled to France with her lifelong friend and correspondent Grace Crowley and attended André Lhote's Academy in Paris and his summer school at Mirmande. Dangar returned to Sydney in 1929, but found resistance in Sydney to the cubist-influenced style she had developed in France. Like her friends Dorrit Black and Grace Crowley, Dangar was strongly influenced by the Modernist and Cubist art movements she was exposed to in Paris.

Dangar travelled back to France in 1930 and joined Moly-Sabata, an artists' commune established by Albert Gleizes. Dangar was heavily influenced by Gleizes teachings. She also pursued an apprenticeship with local potters in the nearby towns of Saint-Desirat and Annonay. She held an exhibition in 1932 at the Musée d'Annonay, in Annonay. She contributed to the development and understanding of modernism, particularly cubism, in Australia through her 21 year correspondence with Grace Crowley and other Australian artists. Crowley kept the letters and gave them to the Mitchell Library and they were subsequently collated and edited by Helen Topliss.

Her letters to Grace Crowley reveal much about the difficulties with which Dangar supported herself and her art at this time. Dangar travelled to Morocco in 1939 and spent six months in Fez working with and for, and learning from, local potters. However, political instability and the outbreak of World War II caused her to cut the trip short and she was back in France in 1940.

Dangar lived in Sablons throughout the war and decided to remain there after the war. Anne Dangar died of complications from a stroke at Moly-Sabata on 4 September 1951. She was buried at Serrières, Ardèche, across the river from Moly-Sabata.

== Works ==
Dangar was commissioned in 1934 to create La Vierge et l'enfant Jesu [Virgin and infant Jesus] first acquired by Cesar Geoffray and more recently by the Queensland Gallery of Modern Art The work has been identified as a good example of rustic cubism.

Her work is represented in the collections of the National Gallery of Victoria, Powerhouse Museum, Queensland Gallery of Modern Art as well as in many state and regional galleries, and in major French collections such as the Musée National d'Art Moderne, Paris. A significant number of her works are held in the collection of the National Gallery of Australia and the Art Gallery of News South Wales.

== Exhibitions ==
Solo exhibitions of her work include:

- Anne Dangar at Moly-Sabata: Tradition and Innovation, National Gallery of Australia, 13 Jul-28 Oct 2001.
- Anne Dangar Ceramiste: Le cubism au quotidian, Musee de Valence, 26 Jun 2016-26 Feb 2017.
- Anne Dangar: Ceramics from Moly-Sabata, Art Gallery of New South Wales, 11 Aug-21 Oct 2018.

Her work has also been exhibited in several group shows including:

- Intrepid Women: Australian Women Artists in Paris 1900-1950, S.H. Ervin Gallery, Sydney, 6 Jan-11 Mar 2018.
- Abstraction: Celebrating Australian Women Abstract Artists, National Gallery of Australia touring exhibition, 25 Feb-26 Aug 2017.
- Know My Name: Australian Women Artists 1900 to Now, Part One, National Gallery of Australia, 14 Nov 2020-19 May 2021.

== See also ==
- Andrée Le Coultre
