= Margaret Trask =

Australian librarian and academic

Margaret Trask AM
- Born: 28 April 1928; Australia
- Died: 19 November 2002 (aged 74)
- Occupation: Librarian
- Known for: Deputy Chancellor of UTS; founder of the "Australian Information Management Association"
- Parent(s): Mary Winifred Price and Henry Kinsella

Margaret Trask AM (28 April 1928 – 19 November 2002) was an Australian librarian and educator, as well as Deputy Chancellor of the University of Technology Sydney (UTS). She is considered to be a pioneer in the area of information sciences in Australasia.

== Career ==
Trask began her career working for the State Library of New South Wales. She also worked as a librarian for the Penrith City Counci and the University of New South Wales (UNSW). In 1968, she began teaching library studies at the UNSW.

In 1974, Trask founded the School of Library and Information Studies at the Kuring-gai College of Advanced Education, which later became part of the campus at the University of Technology Sydney (UTS). She was the head of the school until 1985, implementing new curriculums for undergraduate and graduate library studies. She was also a member of the UTS council for eight years and received a fellowship from the university in 1991. From 1998 until 2002, Trask served as deputy chancellor of the UTS.

== Related activities ==
Trask became a member of the Library Association of Australia"in 1956. The association awarded her a fellowship in 1969, for her work in helping subsidise public high school libraries. In 1977, she also served as president of the association's "Children's Libraries" section, advocating for better resources for schools.

From 1968 until 1973, she sat on the Secondary Schools Libraries Committee, affecting government policy through her many written reports. In 1985, she co-founded the Australian Information Management Association (AIMA) and became its executive director of Training & Consultancy Services. The AIMA offered leadership development and consultancy services in the area of library sciences, impacting libraries across Australian, New Zealand and the South Pacific.

Trask also wrote numerous articles for library periodicals, as well as for book reviewing and education journals.

== Awards and distinctions ==
In 1979, Trask was appointed a Member of the Order of Australia. Every year, the University of Technology Sydney hands out a medal in her honor to deserving graduates. In 2003, a special issue on Trask's career was published by the "Australian Library Journal". In 2018, a street was named after her in the Canberra suburb of Coombs.

== Background ==
Trask was born on 28 April 1928 in Camden, New South Wales. Her parents were Mary Winifred Price and Henry Kinsella, both immigrants from Ireland. Trask graduated with a bachelor's degree from the University of New England and obtained a Master of Librarianship from the University of New South Wales. She died on 19 November 2002.
