= Clem Renouf =

Australian accountant and President of Rotary International

Sir Clement William Bailey Renouf AM (19 April 1921 – 11 June 2020) was an Australian accountant and President of Rotary International from 1978–79. In this latter role he contributed significantly to the planned eradication of poliomyelitis worldwide.

He was born in Ingham, Queensland in 1921. He joined the Nambour Rotary Club in 1950 and remained a member ever since.

In 1978 he became World President of Rotary International. He died in June 2020 at the age of 99.

== Honours ==
He was appointed a Member of the Order of Australia in 1979. He was knighted in 1988 "for outstanding service to the community", and awarded the Centenary Medal in 2001.

== Other sources ==
- Clem Renouf Biography
- Clem Renouf: CLEM RENOUF President Rotary International, 1978–79
- Paul Henningham, "Introducing Clem Renouf … Quiet Dynamo from Down Under", The Rotarian, July 1978
