= Frank Hinder =

Australian painter, sculptor and art teacher

Frank Hinder AM
- Born: 26 June 1906; Summer Hill, Sydney, New South Wales, Australia
- Died: 31 December 1992 (aged 86); Killara, New South Wales, Australia
- Other name: Francis Henry Critchley Hinder
- Known for: Painting, kinetic art, lumino kinetic art, camouflage

Francis Henry Critchley Hinder AM (26 June 1906 – 31 December 1992) was an Australian painter, sculptor and art teacher who is also known for his camouflage designs in World War II.

== Early life and education ==
Hinder was the fourth child of Enid Marguerite (née Pockley) and Henry Vincent Critchley Hinder (1865–1913). His father was a prominent surgeon, He was born in the family home Carleton a grand Italianate Victorian mansion in Summer Hill, New South Wales. He attended his father's alma mater, Newington College from 1916 until 1918. He then completed his high school education at Shore School, when his mother remarried and moved to the North Shore. As an art student he was tutored by Antonio Dattilo Rubbo at the Royal Art Society of New South Wales and at the East Sydney Technical College. Rubbo had also been his art master at Newington. While travelling he pursued his training at the Art Institute of Chicago, New York School of Fine and Applied Art and at the Taos summer school.

== Early career ==
In the mid-1930s he worked as a commercial artist in the United States and taught at the Child-Walker School of Fine Art, Boston. On 17 May 1930 he married artist Margel Harris at the registry office in Wellesley, Massachusetts. They both returned to Sydney in August 1934, working in theatre design, advertising and graphic art.

== World War II ==
Hinder was a lieutenant (1941–43) in the Citizen Military Forces (CMF). Working with Professor William Dakin, a Sydney University zoologist, and the civilian Sydney Camouflage Group, Hinder was seconded to the Camouflage Wing of the Royal Australian Engineers (1942–44) during World War II where he designed the Hinder Spider, a garnished conical frame for concealing a man, and dummy aircraft such as the Hindup. His wife Margel assisted his work by making scale wooden models.

== Postwar career ==
After the war Hinder took a teaching position at the East Sydney Technical College and then became head of the Art Department of Sydney Teachers' College (now part of the University of Sydney) from 1958 to 1964. In 1952 he was awarded the Blake Prize for Religious Art for his painting Flight into Egypt, which is now held in the collection of the Art Gallery of Western Australia. As an artist he is best known for his abstract paintings, yet he also produced work across a diverse range of materials, including drawings and electric-light sculptures. He was a trustee of the Art Gallery of New South Wales and appointed as a Member of the Order of Australia. His work is held in many publics galleries including the Art Gallery of New South Wales, the Art Gallery of South Australia, the Australian National Gallery, the Australian War Memorial and the National Gallery of Victoria. Frank Hinder died aged 86 on 31 December 1992 at Killara, New South Wales.
